= Too Many Clients =

1960 novel by Rex Stout

- Author: Rex Stout
- Cover artist: Bill English
- Language: English
- Series: Nero Wolfe
- Genre: Detective
- Publisher: Viking Press
- Publication date: October 28, 1960
- Publication place: United States
- Media type: Print (hardcover)
- Pages: 183 pp. (first edition)
- OCLC: 36962356
- Preceded by: Three at Wolfe's Door
- Followed by: The Final Deduction

Too Many Clients is a Nero Wolfe detective novel by Rex Stout, published by the Viking Press in 1960, and later collected in the omnibus volume Three Aces (Viking 1971).

== Plot introduction ==
A man who identifies himself as Thomas Yeager, head of Continental Plastics, asks Archie to ascertain whether he is being followed when he visits a certain address in one of New York's worst neighborhoods. When the real Yeager's body is found at an excavation site in the vicinity of that address, Archie crosses the threshold and finds a fantastically appointed love nest where Yeager secretly entertained many women. The case becomes more complicated when the daughter of the building superintendent is later killed; her novice attempts at blackmail provide Wolfe with critical evidence needed to solve both murders and earn a large fee, shoring up his low bank account balance.

In short order, Wolfe and Archie find themselves beset by prospective clients:

- the Yeager imposter, who allows himself to briefly be thought of as a client and who sparks Archie's interest
- the building superintendent and his wife, who want Archie to keep the police from harassing them (and, later, to catch their daughter's killer)
- an actress, who offers to pay Archie to get her cigarette case out of the love nest
- the directors of Continental Plastics, who want to keep the existence of that room from becoming public knowledge and causing a scandal
- Yeager's widow, who expects Wolfe to solve her husband's murder even if it embarrasses the company

== Archy and Mehitabel ==
In the novel, Archie jokes that he's going to send out Christmas cards signed “Archie and Mehitabel,” implying that his wife's name is Mehitabel. He isn't married, and he's making a reference to Archy and Mehitabel, a series of satiric essays and poems written by Don Marquis and originally published in the 1910s and ‘20s. Archy, the supposed writer of the pieces, is a cockroach, and his best friend is Mehitabel, a cat.

== Reviews and commentary ==
- Anthony Boucher, The New York Times Book Review (November 20, 1960) — Wolfe happens to possess a fragment of inside information on the murder of unusually whole-hearted satyr. Problem: how to parlay this fragment into a sizable fee from a client? Wolfe finally accepts a unique commission to produce the murderer without ever revealing to the police the exact scene of the crime. All markedly ingenious and satisfactory.
- Jacques Barzun and Wendell Hertig Taylor, A Catalogue of Crime — Good treatment of the love-nest theme, integral as well as central, which implies good characterization. Several new touches prevent the reader from taking Wolfe as a cliché. The sole reservation to be made is that the villain is not well enough concealed, perhaps because he is so well cast.
- Sergeant Cuff, Saturday Review of Literature (November 26, 1960) — Archie Goodwin stirs stumps when body of plastics tycoon turns up in Manhattan excavation; mean Inspector Cramer rides herd on Nero Wolfe, but big fellow gets the answer. Easily among his best.
- James Sandoe, New York Herald Tribune (November 13, 1960) — One of Mr. Stout's brighter books, brisk, light, incisive going. Mr. Stout rarely plays "fair" and here gives Nero a lot more information than we have (by keeping it away from Archie) so that it can be concluded with a sharp surprise. Excellent diversion.
- Terry Teachout, "Forty years with Nero Wolfe" (January 12, 2009) — Rex Stout's witty, fast-moving prose hasn't dated a day, while Wolfe himself is one of the enduringly great eccentrics of popular fiction. I've spent the past four decades reading and re-reading Stout's novels for pleasure, and they have yet to lose their savor ... It is to revel in such writing that I return time and again to Stout's books, and in particular to The League of Frightened Men, Some Buried Caesar, The Silent Speaker, Too Many Women, Murder by the Book, Before Midnight, Plot It Yourself, Too Many Clients, The Doorbell Rang, and Death of a Doxy, which are for me the best of all the full-length Wolfe novels.

== Adaptations ==
=== Nero Wolfe (A&E Network) ===
Too Many Clients was adapted for the second season of the A&E TV series A Nero Wolfe Mystery (2001–2002). Directed by John L'Ecuyer from a teleplay by Sharon Elizabeth Doyle, "Too Many Clients" made its debut in two one-hour episodes airing June 2 and 9, 2002, on A&E.

Timothy Hutton is Archie Goodwin; Maury Chaykin is Nero Wolfe. Other members of the cast (in credits order) include Colin Fox (Fritz Brenner), Bill Smitrovich (Inspector Cramer), Conrad Dunn (Saul Panzer), Trent McMullen (Orrie Cather), Fulvio Cecere (Fred Durkin), Bill MacDonald (Austin Hough), Marty Moreau (Cabbie), Jeannette Sousa (Maria Perez), R. D. Reid (Sergeant Purley Stebbins), Saul Rubinek (Lon Cohen), Alex Poch-Goldin (Cesar Perez), Lucy Filippone (Mrs. Perez), Kari Matchett (Meg Duncan), Christine Brubaker (Julia McGee), James Tolkan (Benedict Aiken), Debra Monk (Mrs. Yeager) and Dina Barrington (Dinah Hough). Michael Sarrazin is uncredited in flashbacks as murder victim Thomas Yeager.

In addition to original music by Nero Wolfe composer Michael Small, the soundtrack includes music by guitarist David Savcic (titles) (Note: David Savcic, "Caramba". KPM Music, KPM 413, Beyond Spain (track 1).) and Ángel Villoldo. (Note: Ángel Villoldo, "El Choclo", arranged by Colin Frechter. Carlin Production Music, CAR 164, Latin American (track 13).)

Nero Wolfe was released on DVD by A&E Home Video (ISBN 076708893X). "Too Many Clients" is one of three telefilms initially aired in two parts that A&E released as a "double episode" with a single set of titles and credits. (Note: "Motherhunt" (disc 5), "Too Many Clients" (disc 6) and "The Silent Speaker" (disc 7) were issued by A&E Home Video as continuous films with a single set of titles and credits. Other two-part films ("Champagne for One," "Prisoner's Base," "Over My Dead Body") are split into separate episodes as they originally aired on A&E.)

== Publication history ==
- 1960, New York: The Viking Press, October 28, 1960, hardcover

Bookseller and publisher Otto Penzler describes the first edition of Too Many Clients: "Yellow cloth, front cover and spine printed with red; rear cover blank. Issued in a mainly bright pink and yellow dust wrapper." In April 2006, Firsts: The Book Collector's Magazine estimated that the first edition of Too Many Clients had a value of between $200 and $350. The estimate is for a copy in very good to fine condition in a like dustjacket.

- 1961, New York: Viking (Mystery Guild), February 1961, hardcover (Note: The far less valuable Viking book club edition may be distinguished from the first edition in three ways: The dust jacket has "Book Club Edition" printed on the inside front flap, and the price is absent (first editions may be price clipped if they were given as gifts).; Book club editions are sometimes thinner and always taller (usually a quarter of an inch) than first editions.; Book club editions are bound in cardboard, and first editions are bound in cloth (or have at least a cloth spine).)
- 1961, London: Collins Crime Club, August 3, 1961, hardcover
- 1962, London, Ontario: Macmillan, 1962, hardcover
- 1962, New York: Bantam #J2334, March 1962, paperback
- 1963, London: Fontana, 1963, paperback
- 1971, New York: The Viking Press, Three Aces: A Nero Wolfe Omnibus (with Might as Well Be Dead and The Final Deduction), May 10, 1971, hardcover
- 1990, New York: Bantam Books ISBN 5-552-55266-0 July 1990, paperback
- 1996, Newport Beach, California: Books on Tape, Inc. ISBN 0-7366-3400-2 May 31, 1996, audio cassette (unabridged, read by Michael Prichard)
- 2011, New York: Bantam Crimeline ISBN 978-0-307-76819-3 July 7, 2011, e-book
