= Over My Dead Body (novel) =

1940 book by Rex Stout

- Author: Rex Stout
- Cover artist: Robert Graves
- Language: English
- Series: Nero Wolfe
- Genre: Detective fiction
- Publisher: Farrar & Rinehart
- Publication date: January 3, 1940
- Publication place: United States
- Media type: Print (Hardcover)
- Pages: 293 (first edition)
- OCLC: 9421320
- Preceded by: Some Buried Caesar
- Followed by: Where There's a Will

Over My Dead Body is the seventh Nero Wolfe detective novel by Rex Stout. The story first appeared in abridged form in The American Magazine (September 1939). The novel was published in 1940 by Farrar & Rinehart, Inc.

== Plot introduction ==
"I'm resigning as of this moment."
"Resigning from what?"
"You. My job."
"Rubbish."
"No, boss, really. You told the G-man you have never married. Yet you have a daughter. Well—" I shrugged. "I'm not a prude, but there are limits—"

— A scandalized Archie ragging Wolfe, in Over My Dead Body, chapter 2

In Over My Dead Body Rex Stout begins to explore Wolfe's Montenegrin background. By 1939, of course, the Wolfe/Goodwin books had become an established series but Wolfe's youth had yet to be clarified. Stout starts to do so in this book by bringing in a number of European visitors, including some from Montenegro; the backdrop is the maneuvers of the Axis and Allied powers to dominate Yugoslavia. In the first chapter Wolfe tells FBI Agent Stahl that he was born in the United States—a declaration at odds with all other references in the corpus. Stout's authorized biographer John McAleer explained the reason for the anomaly:

Rex told me that even in 1939 Wolfe was irked by the FBI's consuming curiosity about the private business of law-abiding citizens. In consequence, Wolfe felt under no constraint to tell the truth about himself when interrogated by Stahl. There was, however, another reason for Wolfe's contradictory statements about his place of origin. Rex explained: "Editors and publishers are responsible for the discrepancy. … In the original draft of Over My Dead Body Nero was a Montenegrin by birth, and it all fitted previous hints as to his background; but violent protests from The American Magazine, supported by Farrar & Rinehart, caused his cradle to be transported five thousand miles. … I got tired of all the yapping, and besides it seemed highly improbable that anyone would give a damn, or even, for that matter, ever notice it."

== Plot summary ==
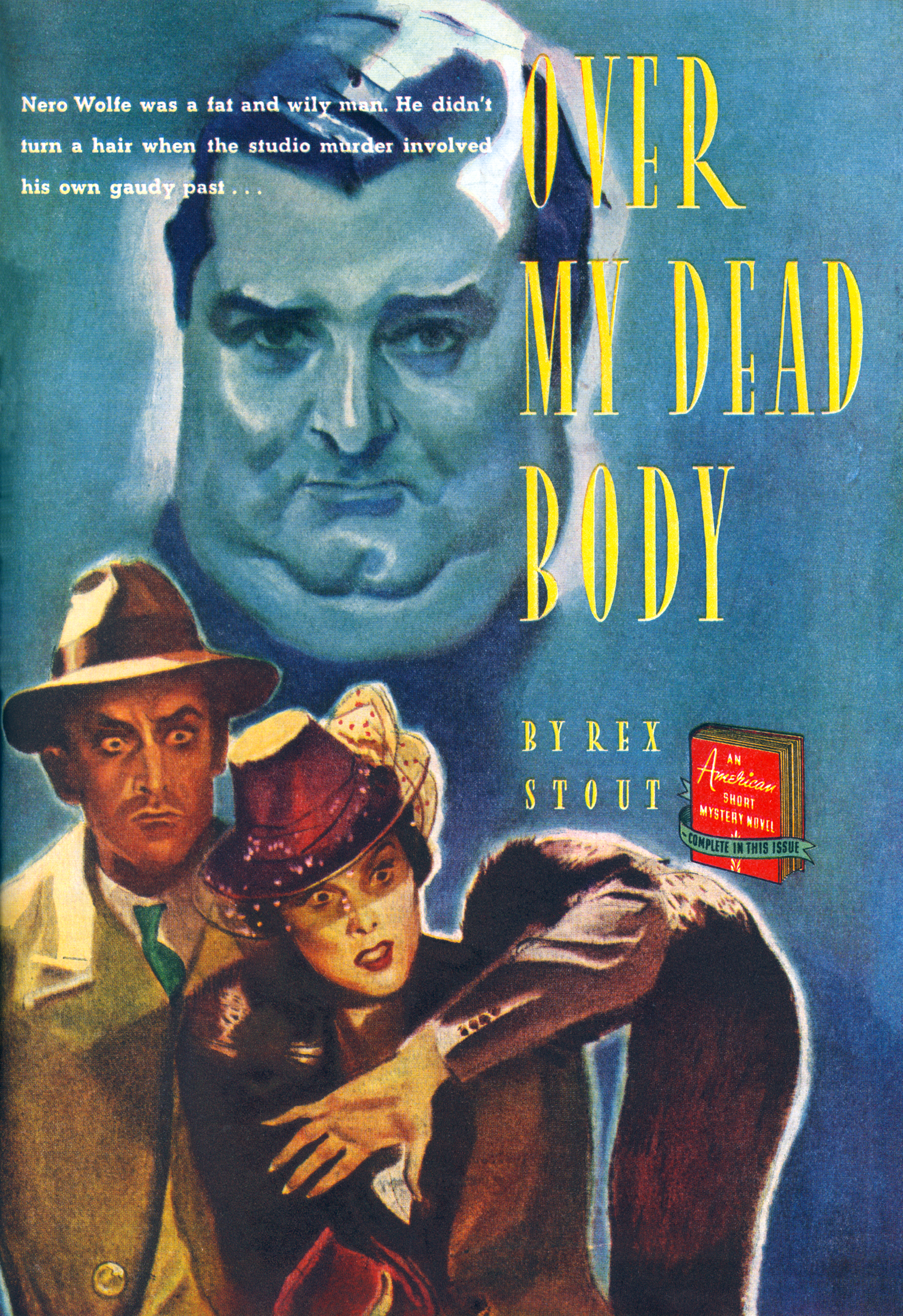
Carl Mueller illustrated the abridged version of Over My Dead Body for The American Magazine (September 1939), the first appearance of the Nero Wolfe mystery.

Nero Wolfe is approached by Carla Lovchen, a young fencing instructor and immigrant from Montenegro, on behalf of her co-worker and fellow immigrant, Neya Tormic. Neya has been wrongfully accused of stealing diamonds out of the coat pockets of Nat Driscoll, a wealthy student at the fencing studio where she and Carla work. Wolfe reacts with unusual hostility to Carla's presence, storms out of the room and refuses to consider her request.

Wolfe realizes that she had another motive for visiting him; she has hidden a letter inside a book in Wolfe's office. The letter, written in Serbo-Croatian, empowers Princess Vladanka Donevich, a Croatian aristocrat, to secretly negotiate with a foreign power over the rights to Yugoslavian forestry interests. When Carla returns, still wanting Wolfe's help, she shocks Wolfe and Archie with the news that Neya is Wolfe's long-lost daughter, and has the adoption certificate as proof. Wolfe admits that he adopted an orphaned three-year-old girl during his military service in Montenegro and lost contact with her during the political upheavals following the First World War. To avoid embarrassment, Wolfe agrees to assist her.

Archie and Carla go to the fencing studio, where Archie meets Neya. A British student at the studio named Percy Ludlow provides an alibi for Neya. Neya seems confused by Ludlow’s alibi. The matter is resolved when Driscoll arrives, sheepishly confessing that the diamonds had never been stolen; he had simply forgotten where he had left them. Later that day, Archie is present in the studio when Percy Ludlow is found dead, killed with an épée. The murderer has stolen a device called a col de mort that can be attached to a blunted épée, making it a deadly weapon. As the police arrive, Archie sees that his coat pocket has something extra in it. Fearing that the murderer has planted the col de mort there, Archie slips away to the brownstone, where he and Wolfe confirm his suspicions.

Neya Tormic is the main suspect in Ludlow's murder; she was the last person seen with him. Another student, Rudolf Faber, provides her an alibi. Her guilt seems to be confirmed when Madame Zorka, a Manhattan couturière who studies at the studio, calls Archie claiming she saw Neya plant the col de mort. Wolfe summons her, Neya and the police to his office to reveal what has happened. Madam Zorka disappears. Neya confesses that she did plant the col de mort on Archie, claiming that it had already been planted on her.

Inspector Cramer is aggrieved when powerful interests begin to interfere with his investigation. Ludlow was a British agent on confidential business, leading Wolfe to suspect that he was investigating the Yugoslavian forestry deal. Rudolf Faber visits Wolfe, claiming he acts in Neya's interests. Left briefly alone in the office, Faber seeks the letter in the book where Carla had placed it, confirming Faber’s role in the forest deal.

Donald Barrett, a banker and fencing student, approaches Wolfe in Neya's interests. Barrett is the son of John Barrett, part of the firm in the forest deal. Wolfe realizes that Donald is hiding Madame Zorka. As his father's involvement with the deal is illegal under American law, Wolfe threatens to expose them unless Barrett produces Zorka. Capitulating, Barrett takes Archie to Zorka. Wolfe attempts to question Zorka but she is incoherent. Wolfe allows her to remain in the brownstone to sleep it off, but she leaves using the fire escape overnight. She is found and brought back. Saul Panzer reveals that she is Pansy Bupp, a girl from Iowa who knows Zorka is a better name for her business. John P. Barrett visits Wolfe, seeking to stop Wolfe’s interference with the forest deal. This appeal fails.

Neya demands the letter from Wolfe, who refuses to surrender it. Wolfe agrees to return it the next day, after he retrieves it from its place of safety.

Archie and Neya go to the apartment the two immigrants share. Upon arrival, they discover Rudolf Faber murdered on the floor. Carla is not there. The police trace Carla to an office building, not knowing which office. Archie realizes that Nat Driscoll's business is there. Archie persuades Carla to come to Wolfe's office, sneaking her past the police by disguising her as a hotel bellboy.

Wolfe sees through this confusion. He begins by sending Neya away, with an envelope. After she leaves, Wolfe has Cramer and the Barretts in his office. He reveals that Neya is the murderer; she is the Princess Vladanka, posing as an immigrant for her deal with the Nazi Faber. Ludlow uncovers her true identity, prompting Neya to murder him. Faber discovers her crime, leading Neya to murder him as well. Proofs of her identity are given to Cramer. Wolfe makes clear to the Barretts that their forest deal is off, and warns them that the son might be arrested as accessory to Ludlow’s murder.

The envelope Wolfe gave Neya held a note informing her that she was no longer his client. Infuriated, Neya returns to attack Wolfe. She is killed when Wolfe uses two beer bottles in defense, and one hits her head. Later, Wolfe reveals to Carla that he knows that she is his adopted daughter, and offers to support her in America.

== Cast of characters ==
- Nero Wolfe — Famous detective
- Archie Goodwin — Wolfe's young assistant, and the narrator of all Wolfe stories
- Carla Lovchen — Beautiful Montenegrin girl, immigrant from Zagreb
- Neya Tormic — Carla's emotional friend and Wolfe's client, immigrant from Zagreb
- Nikola Miltan — Macedonian épée champion, owner of a fencing and dancing studio in Manhattan where Tormic and Lovchen work
- Jeanne Miltan — His wife
- John P. Barrett — Wealthy international banker, involved with intrigues and secret transactions involving royal holdings in Bosnia, who trades with Nazis in Germany
- Donald Barrett — His son, and a fencing student at Miltan's studio
- Madame Zorka — Couturière, client of Miltan's studio, and business associate of Donald Barrett
- Inspector Cramer — Head of the New York Police Department's homicide squad
- Nat Driscoll — Fencing student at Miltan's studio
- Rudolph Faber — Fencing student at Miltan's studio, connected to the German government (the Nazis in 1939)
- Percy Ludlow — Fencing student at Miltan's studio, connected to the British government
- Saul Panzer, Fred Durkin, Orrie Cather — Freelance detectives employed by Wolfe (Operative Johnny Keems is referenced, but is ultimately not available.)
- Stahl, the G-man — Senior FBI investigator who appears at odd moments asking personal questions of Wolfe, concerned that Wolfe must register under a new law for people doing business for foreign powers; Wolfe does not register and dislikes the personal questions.

== Allusion to real events and people ==
In Chapter 1, Archie describes Carla as having “a nice voice but she talks like Lynn Fontanne in Idiot’s Delight.” That was a stage play in the late 1930s. Lynn Fontanne played the mistress of a German arms dealer in Idiot's Delight, speaking with a Russian accent. The original cast ran 300 performances in 1936-1937, and the play won a Pulitzer Prize for Drama for the playwright.

Wolfe is confused by the names of two characters, Carla Lovchen and Madame Zorka, and he pressed both on their names. Lovchen is another spelling for Lovćen, the tall forested mountain that gives Montenegro its name, the same as Crna Gora in the local language. All the terms mean Black Mountain. Carla was using the name of her country as her last name.

Princess Zorka of Montenegro was the daughter of the king of Montenegro in the late 1800s. She died young at age 25, having borne five children. Her widower went on to be king of Serbia. She was a major figure in Montenegrin history, with a statue honoring her when this novel was written. Using her name as a business name while having no personal ties to Montenegro or any other part of Yugoslavia may have been good for the fashion business of an American from the Midwest, but it frustrated Wolfe as he saw this as pure falsehood by the American seller of high fashion clothes, especially as she took so long to explain it.

== Reviews and commentary ==
- Isaac Anderson, The New York Times Book Review (January 7, 1940) — There is more of Archie Goodwin than of Nero Wolfe in this book, and that is all to the good, for, although Wolfe is Archie's boss and the one who does the heavy thinking, Archie is, unless our guess is wide of the mark, the person whom readers of the Nero Wolfe stories take to their hearts. If Nero is the brains of the concern, Archie is its arms and hands and legs. When Nero wants something done, he does not need to tell Archie how to do it. Archie will figure that out for himself, and the thing is as good as done, however difficult the assignment may be. In the murder case with which this story deals there are international complications which make things unusually difficult. The police and the G-men are in it too, but the best that they can do is to watch Nero Wolfe and wait for him to come through with the solution. The book is full of surprises for everybody concerned, including not only the reader but also the police, Archie and even Nero Wolfe himself. Read one chapter of this book and you will need no urging to go on with it.
- Jacques Barzun and Wendell Hertig Taylor, A Catalogue of Crime — This is the tale in which we learn that Nero has been married, has adopted a daughter in his native Montenegro, and has become a U.S. citizen in order to enjoy peace and democracy. The plot hinges on international and domestic secrets but it is sober and sound. Archie, Cramer, and the rest of the cast are in top form, and Nero is noticeably more outspoken and impulsive than he subsequently became.
- J. Kenneth Van Dover, At Wolfe's Door — The first half dozen Wolfe novels established the detective as an original creation. Over My Dead Body begins the long line of pleasant entertainments in which Wolfe and Archie exploit the familiar formulas.

== Adaptations ==
=== Nero Wolfe (A&E Network) ===
An adaptation of Over My Dead Body concluded the first season of the A&E TV series A Nero Wolfe Mystery (2001–2002). Sharon Elizabeth Doyle and Janet Roach wrote the teleplay for the episode, which was directed by Timothy Hutton. "Over My Dead Body" made its debut in two one-hour episodes airing July 8 and 15, 2001, on A&E.

Timothy Hutton is Archie Goodwin; Maury Chaykin is Nero Wolfe. Other members of the cast (in credits order) are Bill Smitrovich (Inspector Cramer), Ron Rifkin (Nikola Miltan), Colin Fox (Fritz Brenner), James Tolkan (Percy Ludlow), George Plimpton (John Barrett). Kari Matchett (Carla Lovchen), Debra Monk (Madame Zorka), Francie Swift (Neya Tormic), Trent McMullen (Orrie Cather), Conrad Dunn (Saul Panzer), Robert Bockstael (Agent Stahl), Nicky Guadagni (Jeanne Miltan), Hrant Alianak (Nat Driscoll), R.D. Reid (Sergeant Purley Stebbins), Richard Waugh (Rudolph Faber), Dina Barrington (Belinda Reade) and Boyd Banks (Duncan Barrett, the same character called "Donald Barrett" in the original novel, yet, oddly, still referred to as "Donny-Bonny" in the teleplay's dialog by Belinda Reade, Madame Zorka, and sarcastically by Archie, just as in the novel).

In addition to original music by Nero Wolfe composer Michael Small, the soundtrack includes music by Johannes Brahms (opening sequence), Ib Glindemann, Jacques Offenbach and David Steinberg.

In North America, A Nero Wolfe Mystery was released on Region 1 DVD by A&E Home Video (ISBN 076708893X). "Over My Dead Body" is divided into two parts as originally broadcast on A&E. (Note: "Champagne for One" (disc 1), "Prisoner's Base" (disc 2) and "Over My Dead Body" (disc 3) are split into two parts as they originally aired on A&E. Three other telefilms originally shown as two-parters — "Motherhunt" (disc 5), "Too Many Clients" (disc 6) and "The Silent Speaker" (disc 7) — are issued by A&E Home Video as continuous films with a single set of titles and credits.)

"Over My Dead Body" is one of the Nero Wolfe episodes released on Region 2 DVD in the Netherlands by Just Entertainment, under license from FremantleMedia Enterprises. A Nero Wolfe Mystery — Serie 2 (2010) was the first DVD release of the international version of the episode, which presents "Over My Dead Body" as a 90-minute film with a single set of titles and credits. Included is a brief scene in which Archie and Fritz put Madame Zorka to bed in the south room. "Fritz is a real gentleman," Archie says in voiceover. "She may not have arrived with a nightie or a toothbrush, but for the honor of the house, by golly, she got orchids." The Netherlands release has optional Dutch subtitles and, like the A&E DVD release, presents the episode in 4:3 pan and scan rather than its 16:9 aspect ratio for widescreen viewing.

The adaptation is faithful to the novel save for a few changes in detail, such as Donald Barrett being renamed Duncan Barrett and Archie conscripting a bellboy at the Maidstone Building to provide his uniform for Carla Lovchen instead of phoning a nearby hotel and asking the house detective he knows there to send a bellboy over to make the switch with Carla. The script also contains a factual error: when Zorka is unmasked, Wolfe says she was born in "Ottumwa, Minnesota", instead of Ottumwa, Iowa, as in the novel.

=== Nero Wolfe (Radiotelevisione italiana S.p.A.) ===
Over My Dead Body was adapted for the eighth episode of the RAI TV series Nero Wolfe (Italy 2012), starring Francesco Pannofino as Nero Wolfe and Pietro Sermonti as Archie Goodwin. Set in 1959 in Rome, where Wolfe and Archie reside after leaving the United States, the series was produced by Casanova Multimedia and Rai Fiction and directed by Riccardo Donna. "Coppia di spade" aired May 24, 2012.

== Publication history ==
- 1939, The American Magazine, September 1939, abridged
- 1940, New York: Farrar & Rinehart, January 3, 1940, hardcover

Bookseller and publisher Otto Penzler describes the first edition of Over My Dead Body: "Turquoise cloth, front cover and spine printed with dark blue; rear cover blank. Issued in a full-color pictorial dust wrapper … The first edition has the publisher's monogram logo on the copyright page." In April 2006, Firsts: The Book Collector's Magazine estimated that the first edition of Over My Dead Body had a value of between $4,000 and $7,500. The estimate is for a copy in very good to fine condition in a like dustjacket.

- 1940, New York: Omnibook Magazine, February 1940, abridged
- 1940, Toronto: Oxford University Press, 1940, hardcover
- 1940, London: Collins Crime Club, October 7, 1940, hardcover
- 1943, New York: Lawrence E. Spivak, Jonathan Press Mystery #J6, 1943, abridged, paperback
- 1945, New York: Avon #62, 1945, first unabridged paperback
- 1955, Harmondsworth, Middlesex: Penguin Books #1106, 1955, paperback
- 1965, London: Panther, February 1965, paperback
- 1979, New York: Jove #M4865, March 1979, paperback
- 1992, London: Scribners (Macdonald) "by arrangement with Bantam Books" ISBN 0-356-20110-4, hardcover
- 1994, New York: Bantam Crimeline ISBN 0-553-23116-2 January 1994, paperback, Rex Stout Library edition with introduction by John Jakes
- 1994, Auburn, California: The Audio Partners, Mystery Masters series, ISBN 978-1572700628, unabridged book on tape, narrated by Michael Pritchard, and Books on Tape Library edition, ISBN 978-0736627474
- 2007, Auburn, California: The Audio Partners Publishing Corp., Mystery Masters ISBN 978-1572707306 March 28, 2007, audio CD (unabridged, read by Michael Prichard, original copyright 1994)
- 2010, New York: Bantam ISBN 978-0-307-75608-4 July 21, 2010, e-book
