= Prisoner's Base =

1952 novel by Rex Stout

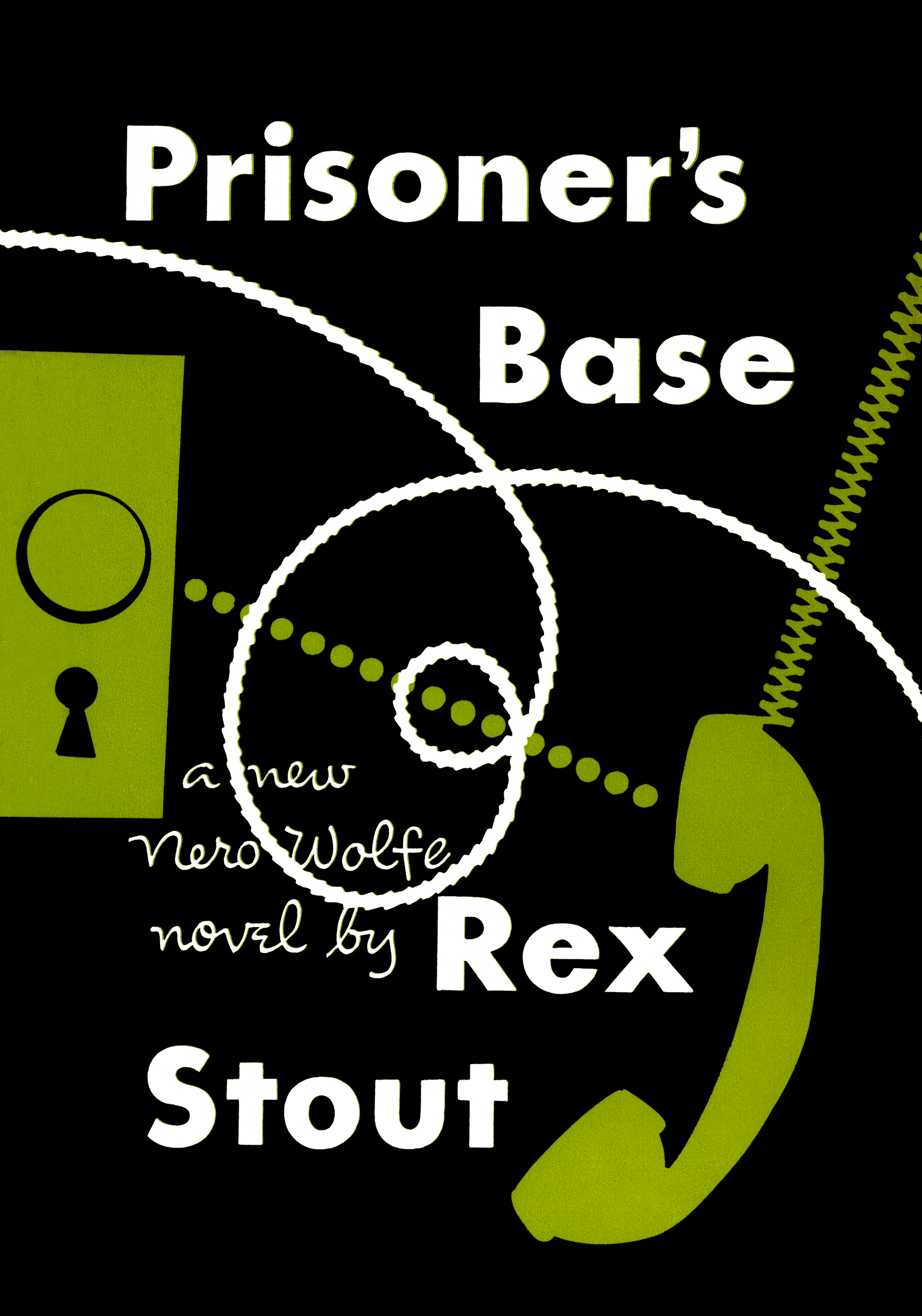
- Author: Rex Stout
- Cover artist: Bill English
- Language: English
- Series: Nero Wolfe
- Genre: Detective fiction
- Publisher: Viking Press
- Publication date: October 24, 1952
- Publication place: United States
- Media type: Print (Hardcover)
- Pages: 186 pp. (first edition)
- OCLC: 36962338
- Preceded by: Triple Jeopardy
- Followed by: The Golden Spiders

Prisoner's Base (British title Out Goes She) is a Nero Wolfe detective novel by Rex Stout, first published by Viking Press in 1952.

== Plot introduction ==
As far as I know, no electrons had darted in either direction when I first laid eyes on Priscilla Eads, nor had I felt faint or dizzy at any point during my association with her, but the fact remains that I have never had swifter or stronger hunches than the two that were connected with her. Monday evening, before Helmar had said much more than twenty words about his missing ward, I had said to myself, "She's upstairs," and knew it. Tuesday morning, when I saw Inspector Cramer of Manhattan Homicide on the stoop, I said to myself, "She's dead," and knew it.

— Archie, reflecting, in Prisoner's Base, chapter 3.

A young woman who will shortly inherit control of a large manufacturing firm wants to rent a room in Nero Wolfe's house. Wolfe, outraged, puts her out; she is found murdered later that night. With no client in sight, Wolfe is not interested, but Archie feels responsible. His first step is to crash a meeting of the manufacturer's board of directors.

The 1992 Bantam edition reprints the typewritten title page of Rex Stout's 1952 manuscript, showing that the book's original title was Dare-Base. Darebase, also called prisoner's base, is a children's game, a variation on tag.

"The title on my manuscript was Dare-Base, from a game we played in Kansas when I was a boy," Rex Stout told biographer John McAleer. "My publisher, Harold Guinzburg, said it was better known as prisoner's base." Late one night, Archie muses that the situation faced by one of the characters is like the game — it's up to her to get from one base to another without being tagged. But she does get tagged.

== Plot summary ==
Collins Crime Club released the first British edition of Prisoner's Base in 1953, as Out Goes She

After an argument between Archie and Wolfe over Archie's weekly paycheck, a young woman arrives at the brownstone with an unusual request. She wants to rent a room until June 30, one week away, without revealing her identity or presence to anyone. Wolfe rejects the idea, but before he and Archie can send her away, a lawyer named Perry Helmar arrives. He is the legal guardian of Priscilla Eads, a young woman who has gone missing, and he wants to hire Wolfe to find her before June 30. The photographs he has brought with him convince Archie that Priscilla is the house guest.

The terms of her father's will state that Priscilla is to inherit 90% of the stock in Softdown, a major towel manufacturer, when she reaches her 25th birthday on June 30. However, her ex-husband, Eric Hagh - currently living in South America - claims that she signed a document giving him half of her property. In addition, several Softdown officers are concerned about Priscilla suddenly becoming a majority stockholder.

Wolfe sends Helmar away without an immediate decision, then offers Priscilla a choice. She can either pay the same fee Helmar offered and stay at the brownstone incognito, or she can leave and Wolfe will accept Helmar's terms and begin tracking her down the following morning. She chooses to leave, but before Wolfe can call Helmar the next day, Inspector Cramer brings news that both Priscilla and her maid, Margaret Fomos, have been strangled to death. Margaret had keys to Priscilla's apartment, but they were not found on her body, leading the police to conclude that the murderer targeted her first in order to gain access to Priscilla.

While Archie feels guilt at his involvement in the events that led to Priscilla's death, Wolfe takes no interest in the case, having no client and no prospect of a fee. Infuriated, Archie storms out to begin investigating on his own. He barges into a meeting of Softdown personnel, four of whom are officers who will inherit Priscilla's stock in her place, and learns from them that Helmar will receive shares as well. Before he can learn much more, Lieutenant Rowcliff arrives and arrests him, based on claims that he had impersonated a police officer to get into the building.

While being questioned, Archie learns that thanks to Rowcliff's pettiness and overeagerness, Wolfe has been taken into custody as a material witness. Outraged, Wolfe states that he does now have a client – Archie – and the two are released. From Lon Cohen, Archie learns about Priscilla's background, her marriage and time spent living in South America, and her best friend Sarah Jaffee, who owns the remaining 10% of the Softdown stock. Sarah tells Archie that Priscilla had planned to oust the company's board of directors and replace them all with women, including herself, Sarah, and Margaret. Archie urges her to file an injunction blocking the four Softdown officers from exercising the voting rights on the stock they hold until the murders have been solved, but she turns down the idea. He also tries to question Margaret's husband Andy, but without success.

Shortly after Archie returns to the brownstone, a lawyer named Albert M. Irby arrives and asks to see Wolfe. He represents Hagh, who is due to arrive in New York the following afternoon. That next morning, Sarah decides to act on Archie's suggestion of legal action; Wolfe arranges representation for her by Nathaniel Parker, his lawyer. He uses the decision as leverage to bring all of the involved parties - the four Softdown officers, Helmar, Sarah, Parker, Andy, Hagh, and Irby - to his office for a meeting that night.

The meeting yields little of use, but after everyone has left, Sarah calls Archie from her apartment to report that her keys are missing. Suspecting that the murderer may have stolen them and is lying in wait, he instructs her to leave the phone off the hook and exit so that he can clearly hear her; when the line goes silent, he rushes to her building and finds her strangled to death in the apartment.

After being questioned and released from custody, Archie discovers that Wolfe has brought Saul Panzer in on the case and provided him with expense money. He observes the interrogation of several people who were at the meeting, with Cramer's permission, then relays a suggestion to re-enact the night's events at the office. To his surprise, Wolfe accepts.

The gathering takes place at noon that same day, with Saul present as well. Wolfe dismisses the police's initial theory that Margaret was killed only to get her keys and/or because she recognized her attacker. Saul had traveled to South America, carrying a photograph of Hagh that Sarah had given to Archie, and learned that he had died three months earlier. The man claiming to be Hagh is in fact Siegfried Muecke, an associate who left South America shortly after Hagh's death. Muecke had learned of the document Hagh and Priscilla signed, witnessed by Margaret, and traveled to New York to collect half her property. He killed all three women because they had seen the real Hagh, either in person or through photographs, and could expose his deception.

Archie vents his frustration by punching Andy when he lunges at Muecke, who is quickly arrested.

== The unfamiliar word ==
In most Nero Wolfe novels and novellas, there is at least one unfamiliar word, usually spoken by Wolfe. Prisoner's Base contains these three:

- Contemn: to treat or regard with disdain, scorn, or contempt. Chapter 3, Wolfe to Priscilla Eads: "I'm glad you contemn it as blackmail, since I like to pretend that I earn at least a fraction of what I collect...."
- Juridical. Chapter 9.
- Wroth: intensely angry, highly incensed. Chapter 15, Archie's description of Wolfe's tone: "He was gruff but not wroth."

== Cast of characters ==
- Nero Wolfe – The private investigator
- Archie Goodwin – Wolfe's assistant (and the narrator of all Wolfe stories)
- Saul Panzer – Free-lance detective often hired by Wolfe
- Priscilla Eads – Majority stockholder-to-be in Softdown, a large towel manufacturing corporation
- Perry Helmar – Softdown's counsel; also Priscilla's legal guardian and trustee of her inheritance
- Margaret Fomos – Priscilla Eads' maid
- Andreas "Andy" Fomos – Widower of Priscilla's longtime maid
- Daphne O'Neil – Softdown personal secretary
- Sarah Jaffee – Childhood friend of Priscilla's and minority stockholder in Softdown
- Eric Hagh – Priscilla's ex-husband, a resident of Venezuela, and holder of a document granting him half of her property
- Albert M. "Dewdrop" Irby – Hagh's lawyer
- Jay Brucker, Viola Duday, Oliver Pitkin, Bernard Quest – Officers of the Softdown Corporation, who stand to inherit Priscilla's stock if she dies before turning 25
- Inspector Cramer, Lieutenant Rowcliff, Sergeant Purley Stebbins – Representing Manhattan Homicide

== Reviews and commentary ==
- Jacques Barzun and Wendell Hertig Taylor, A Catalogue of Crime — Archie is Nero's client, because he feels responsible for the death of a young woman who sought asylum at Nero's house. In the sequel two other women are strangled as the result of a stupid will and a claim on it foolishly certified. The case is complex, the parties are hostile (so are Nero and Archie) and for once the police behave reasonably and civilly.
- Anthony Boucher, The New York Times Book Review (November 9, 1952) — Pure detection (fleshed, of course, with humor and characterization) remains the trademark of Rex Stout. Prisoner's Base is a bit more conventional than last year's fine Murder by the Book, but still very solidly gratifying. Nero Wolfe refuses sanctuary to a potential client, thereby indirectly causing her death; the resultant investigation places Archie Goodwin in the doubly unheard-of position of being Nero's client himself and working closely with the New York Police Department. The solution is surprising, the construction tight; in this particular vein only Mr. Stout himself is apt to produce a better book.
- The New Yorker (November 1, 1952) — An expert job, tailored to the last detail to the demands of Mr. Stout's admirers.
- Saturday Review of Literature (November 1, 1952) — Archie Goodwin and cops work hard to bring this one off. Good.

== Adaptations ==
=== Nero Wolfe (A&E Network) ===
Fritz (Colin Fox) serves a rum and Coke to Priscilla Eads (Shauna Black) in a scene from "Prisoner's Base" seen only in the international version of Nero Wolfe

Prisoner's Base was adapted for the first season of the A&E TV series A Nero Wolfe Mystery (2001–2002). The teleplay for the episode, written by Lee Goldberg and William Rabkin, was nominated for an Edgar Award by the Mystery Writers of America. Directed by Neill Fearnley, "Prisoner's Base" made its debut in two one-hour episodes airing May 13 and 20, 2001, on A&E. Timothy Hutton is Archie Goodwin; Maury Chaykin is Nero Wolfe. Other members of the cast (in credits order) are Bill Smitrovich (Inspector Cramer), Saul Rubinek (Lon Cohen), Colin Fox (Fritz Brenner), James Tolkan (Bernard Quest). Ron Rifkin (Perry Helmar), Kari Matchett (Sarah Jaffee), Shauna Black (Priscilla Eads), Conrad Dunn (Saul Panzer), Nicky Guadagni (Viola Duday), R.D. Reid (Sergeant Purley Stebbins), Steve Cumyn (Eric Hagh), Gary Reineke (Oliver Pitkin), Hrant Alianak (Nathaniel Parker), David Schurmann (Jay Brucker) and Wayne Best (Albert Irby).

In addition to original music by Nero Wolfe composer Michael Small, the soundtrack includes music by Ib Glindemann (titles) (Note: Ib Glindemann, "Cabaret". Carlin Production Music, CAR 202, Big Band - Jazz - Swing (track 41).) and Johannes Brahms. (Note: Johannes Brahms, Waltz in A flat Major, Op. 39, No. 15. KPM Music, KPM CS 7, Light Classics Volume One (track 12).)

In North America, A Nero Wolfe Mystery was released on Region 1 DVD by A&E Home Video (ISBN 076708893X). "Prisoner's Base" is divided into two parts as originally broadcast on A&E. (Note: "Champagne for One" (disc 1), "Prisoner's Base" (disc 2) and "Over My Dead Body" (disc 3) are split into two parts as they originally aired on A&E. Three other telefilms originally shown as two-parters — "Motherhunt" (disc 5), "Too Many Clients" (disc 6) and "The Silent Speaker" (disc 7) — are issued by A&E Home Video as continuous films with a single set of titles and credits.)

"Prisoner's Base" is one of the Nero Wolfe episodes released on Region 4 DVD in Australia by Magna Pacific, under license by FremantleMedia Enterprises. Nero Wolfe — Collection Two (2008) was the first release of an episode containing scenes not available on the A&E Home Video release. (Note: Nero Wolfe — Collection Two, December 5, 2008; UPC 9315842036140. Two-disc set features include "Prisoner's Base" (presented as a 90-minute film with a single set of titles and credits), "Eeny Meeny Murder Moe" and "Disguise for Murder." Screen format is 4:3 full frame. Rated PG (mild violence) by the Commonwealth of Australia.) The international version presents "Prisoner's Base" as a 90-minute film with a single set of titles and credits, and it includes three scenes (3.5 minutes) found on pp. 3–5, 21 and 27–28 of the script written by Lee Goldberg and William Rabkin. (Note: The three longer scenes in the international version of "Prisoner's Base" are transcribed in a PDF document available on The Wolfe Pack website.)

In 2012 a region-free set of the complete series was released by independent Australian DVD distributor Shock Entertainment, which also made the series available through Australian iTunes. All of these DVD releases present the episode in 4:3 pan and scan rather than its 16:9 aspect ratio for widescreen viewing.

== Publication history ==
Random House discovered in 2011 that most of the Bantam paperback editions of Prisoner's Base lack the final chapter (17), which is 1.5 pages in length in the hardcover editions. The Wolfe Pack, the Nero Wolfe literary society, took the liberty of providing the final chapter in PDF format on its website. The chapter was restored in the Bantam e-book edition of the novel.

- 1952, New York: Viking Press, October 24, 1952, hardcover

Bookseller and publisher Otto Penzler describes the first edition of Prisoner's Base: "Green cloth, front cover and spine printed with black; rear cover blank. Issued in a black, green and white dust wrapper." In April 2006, Firsts: The Book Collector's Magazine estimated that the first edition of Prisoner's Base had a value of between $300 and $500. The estimate is for a copy in very good to fine condition in a like dustjacket.The estimate is for a copy in very good to fine condition in a like dustjacket.

- 1952, Toronto: Macmillan, 1952, hardcover
- 1953, New York: Viking Press (Mystery Guild), February 1953 (Note: The far less valuable Viking book club edition may be distinguished from the first edition in three ways: The dust jacket has "Book Club Edition" printed on the inside front flap, and the price is absent (first editions may be price clipped if they were given as gifts).; Book club editions are sometimes thinner and always taller (usually a quarter of an inch) than first editions.; Book club editions are bound in cardboard, and first editions are bound in cloth (or have at least a cloth spine).)
- 1953, London: Collins Crime Club, June 8, 1953, hardcover (as Out Goes She)
- 1955, New York: Bantam #1326, April 1955, paperback. Second printing May 1955, third printing November 1955. The final chapter (17) is present in this edition.
- 1963, New York: Bantam Books #F2700, new edition, December 1963, paperback. Second printing (#F-3990) March 1969. Sixth printing March 1969, seventh printing (#Q2190, new cover) September 1975, eighth printing (#13227-X) April 1980. This edition is missing the final chapter (17) which is 1.5 pages in length in the hardcover editions.
- 1965, London: Fontana, 1965, paperback (as Out Goes She)
- 1992, New York: Bantam Crimeline ISBN 0-553-24269-5 October 1, 1992, paperback, Rex Stout Library edition with introduction by William DeAndrea. This edition is missing the final chapter (17) which is 1.5 pages in length in the hardcover editions.
- 2008, North Kingstown, Rhode Island: BBC Audiobooks America, Mystery Masters ISBN 978-1-60283-426-2 August 12, 2008 [1995], CD (unabridged, read by Michael Prichard). Prichard's reading is missing the final chapter (17).
- 2010, New York: Bantam Crimeline ISBN 978-0-307-75611-4 June 9, 2010, e-book. Chapter 17 is present in the e-book edition.
