= Nero Wolfe (2001 TV series) =

American television series

- Title illustration and design by Aurore Giscard d'Estaing
- Also known as: A Nero Wolfe Mystery; The Nero Wolfe Mysteries
- Genre: Period drama
- Written by: Sharon Elizabeth Doyle; Lee Goldberg; William Rabkin; Michael Jaffe; Stuart Kaminsky; Janet Roach; Jennifer Salt; Mark Stein
- Directed by: John L'Ecuyer; Timothy Hutton; George Bloomfield; Holly Dale; John R. Pepper; James Tolkan; Neill Fearnley; Michael Jaffe
- Starring: Timothy Hutton; Maury Chaykin; Bill Smitrovich; Colin Fox; Conrad Dunn; Fulvio Cecere; Trent McMullen; R. D. Reid; Saul Rubinek; Kari Matchett; Debra Monk; Nicky Guadagni
- Composer: Michael Small
- Country of origin: United States
- Original language: English
- No. of seasons: 2
- No. of episodes: 20

Production
- Executive producers: Michael Jaffe; Timothy Hutton; Howard Braunstein
- Producers: Susan Murdoch; Randi Richmond
- Production locations: Toronto, Ontario, Canada
- Cinematography: Derek Rogers; John Berrie
- Editors: Paul Winestock; Stephen Lawrence; James Bredin; Susan Shipton
- Camera setup: Single-camera
- Production companies: Jaffe/Braunstein; Films Ltd. and A&E Networks in association with Pearson Television International

Original release
- Network: A&E
- Release: April 22, 2001 – August 18, 2002

Related
- The Golden Spiders: A Nero Wolfe Mystery (2000)

Nero Wolfe is a television series adapted from Rex Stout's series of detective stories that aired for two seasons (2001–2002) on A&E. Set in New York City sometime in the 1940s–1950s, the stylized period drama stars Maury Chaykin as Nero Wolfe and Timothy Hutton as Archie Goodwin. A distinguishing feature of the series is its use of a repertory cast to play non-recurring roles. Nero Wolfe was one of the Top 10 Basic Cable Dramas for 2002.

The series won praise for its high production values and jazzy score by Michael Small, and for preserving the language and spirit of the original stories. Most of the teleplays were written by consulting producer Sharon Elizabeth Doyle and the team of William Rabkin and Lee Goldberg, whose "Prisoner's Base" was nominated for an Edgar Award by the Mystery Writers of America.

A total of 20 episodes were produced over the two-season run. Eight of Stout's novels were adapted into two-hour broadcasts, while 12 of his short stories were filmed as one-hour episodes. The title card of each adaptation was styled A Nero Wolfe Mystery.

Nero Wolfe was produced for A&E by Jaffe/Braunstein Films, one of the first production companies to use high-definition video for television. Although the second season was shot in HD, none of the several home video releases of the series has been issued in HD, and only one of the 20 episodes ("The Silent Speaker") has been issued in 16:9 widescreen format.

== Plot ==
Archie Goodwin introduces Nero Wolfe as "a man who thinks he's the world's greatest detective. Truth being, he is." Grandly obese and famously eccentric, Wolfe is a genius who lives in—and rarely leaves—a large and comfortably furnished brownstone he owns on West 35th Street in Manhattan. Wolfe maintains an inflexible schedule of reading, tending his 10,000 orchids in the rooftop plant rooms, and dining on the fine cuisine of his master chef, Fritz Brenner. To support his opulent lifestyle and meet the payroll of his live-in staff, Wolfe charges high fees for solving crimes that are beyond the abilities of the police, most often the cigar-chewing Inspector Cramer of Manhattan Homicide. Wolfe sometimes calls upon freelance detectives Saul Panzer, Fred Durkin and Orrie Cather; but he depends upon his assistant Archie Goodwin, the street-smart legman whose wisecracking, irreverent voice narrates the stories.

The wardrobe, cars, furnishings and music place Nero Wolfe primarily in the 1940s–1950s. (Note: The exception is the second-season premiere directed by Timothy Hutton. "For Death of a Doxy, Tim decided to play it in the early sixties," producer Michael Jaffe said. "If you look at that episode, it's really fun, because everything—the wardrobe, the art direction—is different, since it's a different generation. It breaks our mold.") It is technically a whodunit series, but like the original Rex Stout stories Nero Wolfe is less concerned with plot than with the interplay between its characters.

"I think that's something that's appreciated by Nero Wolfe fans," said Maury Chaykin, who stars as Nero Wolfe. "If you become focused on the crime, I think you're kind of in the wrong place. It's more the enjoyment of the characters and their eccentricities, and the reality of those characters."

== The Golden Spiders: A Nero Wolfe Mystery ==
The series was preceded by the original film The Golden Spiders: A Nero Wolfe Mystery, a Jaffe/Braunstein Films production that aired on A&E March 5, 2000. Veteran screenwriter Paul Monash adapted Rex Stout's 1953 novel, and Bill Duke directed. A&E initially planned that The Golden Spiders would be the first in a series of two-hour mystery movies featuring Nero Wolfe. The high ratings (3.2 million households) and critical praise garnered by The Golden Spiders prompted A&E to consider a one-hour drama series.

"We were so pleased with the reception of the movie that we said, 'Maybe there's a one-hour show (here),'" said Allen Sabinson, A&E's senior vice president for programming, in June 2000. "I don't believe we were thinking, or Maury Chaykin and Timothy Hutton were thinking, there's a series here. These are not people who do series. What happened was they had such a good time, I think they fell in love with their characters."

== Cast and characters ==
Maury Chaykin as Nero Wolfe

Timothy Hutton as Archie Goodwin

=== Principal ===
Maury Chaykin is the armchair detective Nero Wolfe, a reclusive genius with little patience for people who come between him and his devotion to food, books and orchids. Timothy Hutton is Wolfe's irreverent assistant Archie Goodwin, whose voice narrates the stories. In addition to starring in the series, Hutton directed four episodes and served as an executive producer.

Other members of the principal cast are Colin Fox as Fritz Brenner, Wolfe's master chef; Conrad Dunn (Saul Panzer), Fulvio Cecere (Fred Durkin) and Trent McMullen (Orrie Cather) as the 'teers, three freelance detectives who frequently assist Wolfe; Bill Smitrovich as Inspector Cramer, head of Manhattan's Homicide Bureau; and R.D. Reid as Sergeant Purley Stebbins. Saul Rubinek, who portrayed Saul Panzer in The Golden Spiders, took the role of reporter Lon Cohen in the series. Lon was played by Gerry Quigley in The Golden Spiders.

=== Repertory ===
A distinguishing feature of the series is its use of a repertory cast — Boyd Banks, Nicky Guadagni, Kari Matchett, Debra Monk, George Plimpton, Ron Rifkin, Marian Seldes, Francie Swift, James Tolkan and many other accomplished Canadian and American actors — to play non-recurring roles.

"Just as the series beautifully captures a time when cars with fins, fedoras worn at right angles and women's hats with feathers were all the rage, the existence of such a company also evokes another era," wrote syndicated journalist Jacqueline Cutler, who quotes Timothy Hutton as saying, "I don't think it's been done for a very long time."

"If a stylized, period series based solely on books wasn't enough to separate Nero Wolfe from other TV shows," reported Scarlet Street magazine, "[executive producer Michael] Jaffe decided to employ a returning repertory cast in the guest roles for each episode. He felt that it was necessary to find actors who understood and fit in with the show's unique approach. 'Every other show agonizes about casting,' Jaffe says. 'We don't. We have 20, 30 people in our repertory company and we get great actors to play bit roles.'"

Kari Matchett played a recurring role (Archie Goodwin's sometime girlfriend Lily Rowan) and a non-recurring role (nightclub singer Julie Jaquette) in the same episode, "Death of a Doxy." Nicky Guadagni played two non-recurring characters (a secretary and Mrs. Cramer) in the same episode, "The Silent Speaker."

== Production ==
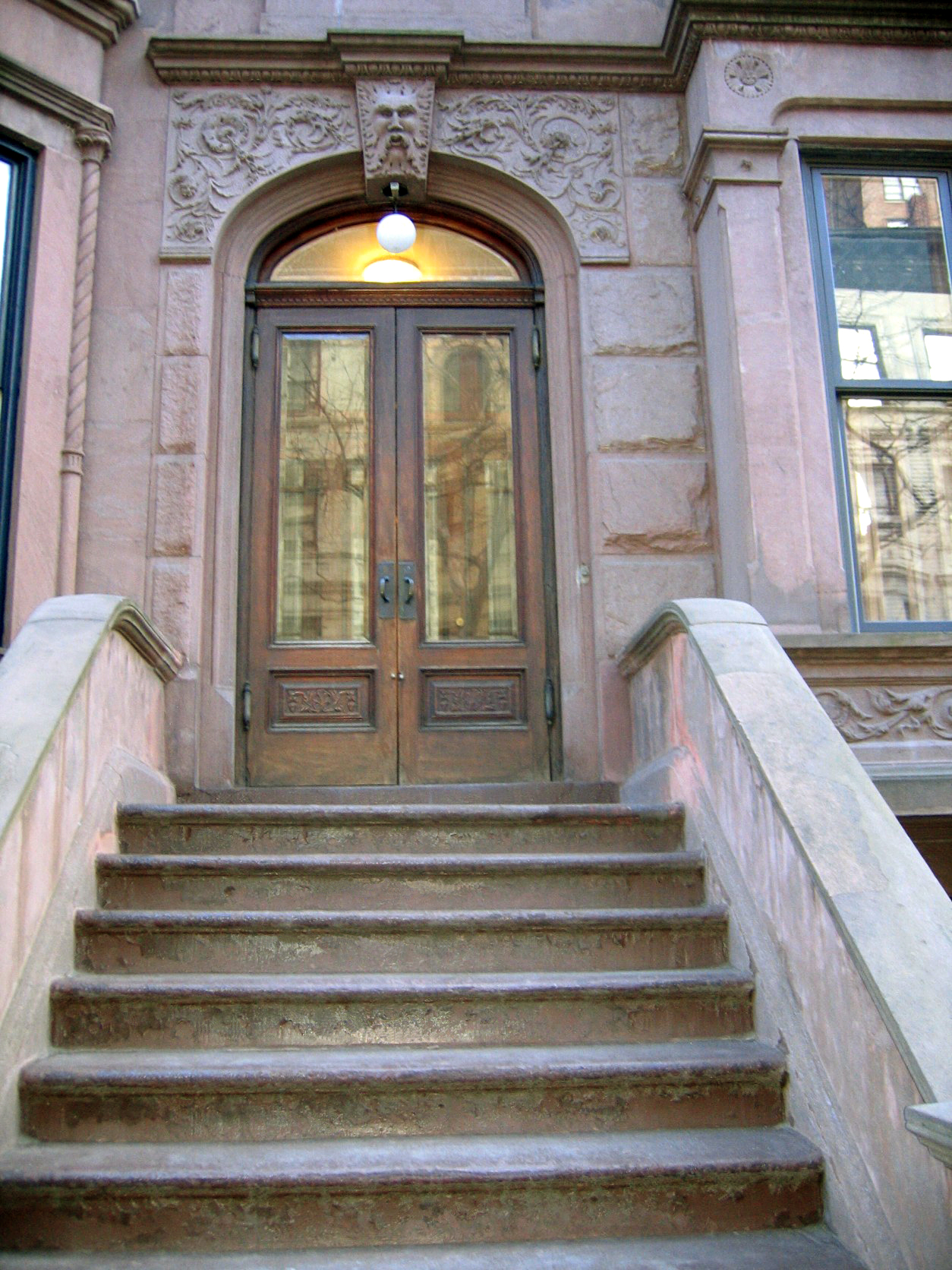

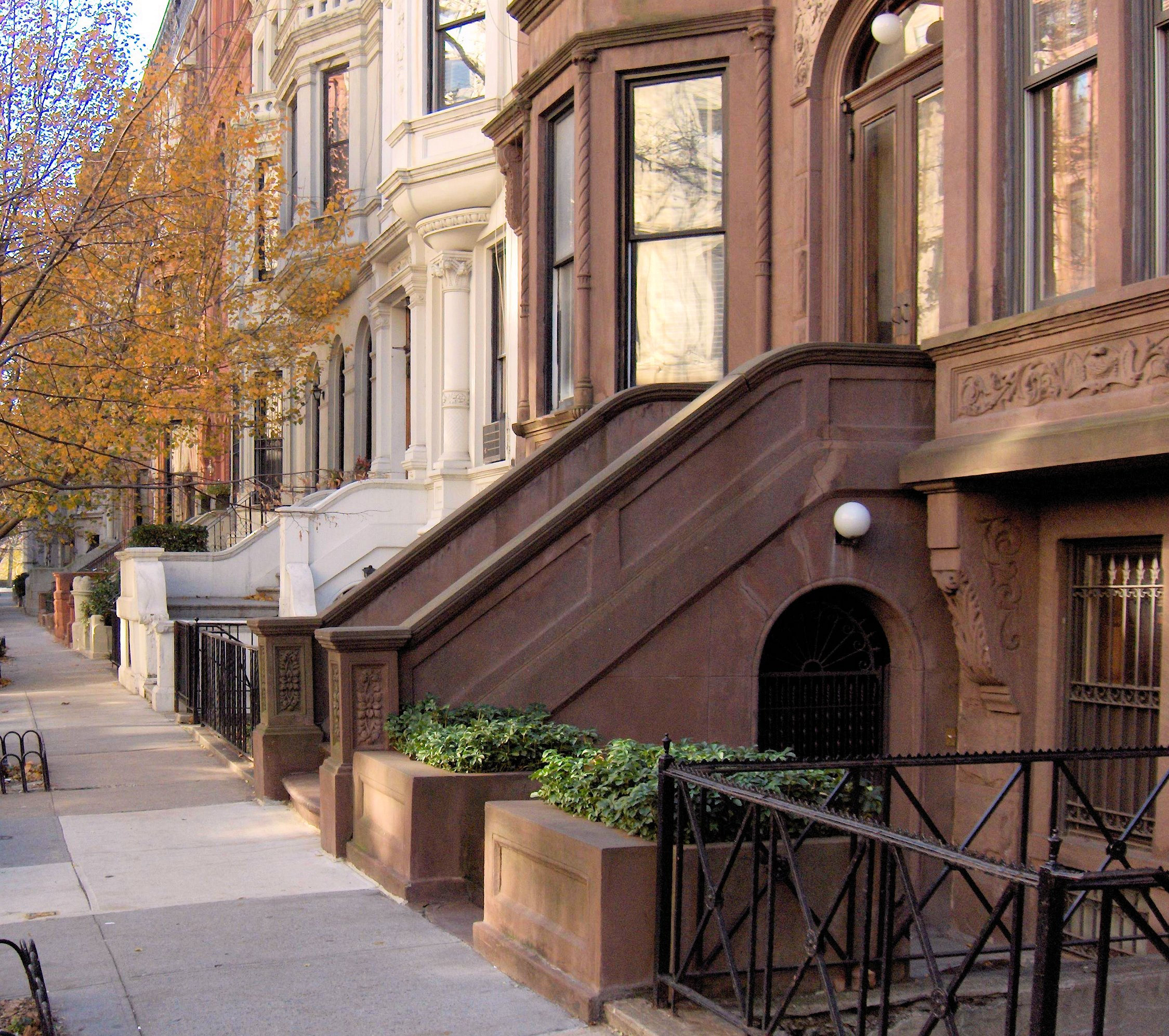
Manhattan Brownstone used for exteriors in Nero Wolfe

Nero Wolfe is a production of A&E Television Networks and Jaffe/Braunstein Films, Ltd., in association with Pearson Television International. The series was shot in Toronto, (Note: "And Hutton, bless him, took pains to make sure that the stoop, meticulously recreated in a freezing Ontario warehouse soundstage really did have seven steps.") with select Manhattan exteriors filmed for the series premiere, "The Doorbell Rang," and seen in subsequent episodes including "Prisoner's Base." (Note: WireImage (image numbers 253302 – 253308) and Getty Images (image number 1302172) document the location photography directed by Timothy Hutton on October 15, 2000, also seen in the A&E documentary, "The Making of Nero Wolfe".)

=== Conception and development ===
Independent producer Michael Jaffe's efforts to secure the rights to the Nero Wolfe stories date back to his earliest days in the business. In the mid-1970s he established a friendship with the Stout estate and was working with his father, Henry Jaffe, a successful attorney turned producer, when the Nero Wolfe rights came on the market. Warner Bros. wanted to adapt the Zeck trilogy for a feature film and approached Henry Jaffe, who traveled to New York to negotiate with the agent for Rex Stout's estate but lost out to Paramount Television.

"We finally got this opportunity," said Michael Jaffe. "I had chased the rights numerous times. One of the reasons that I never actually tried to make it as a series was that I didn't believe a network would ever let us make it the right way. Then A&E came along, and Allen Sabinson. I've known him for years and years. He swore he'd let me make it the right way." (Note: Allen Sabinson became a programming consultant for A&E in 1999, and was named the network's senior vice president for programming in spring 2001.) (Note: Jaffe/Braunstein Films, Ltd., secured the rights to the Nero Wolfe stories in 1998. (U.S. Copyright Office Document Number V3412D882, recorded March 13, 1998.))

The source material for the two seasons of Nero Wolfe was written between 1939 (Over My Dead Body) and 1966 (Death of a Doxy), with most stories written in the 1950s. Jaffe said he chose to stick with the era for the adaptations "because I thought there was so much style that people could identify with and that we could play off. Ultimately, the most important thing is that the audience remain removed from the show by three or four decades. You can't do what Paramount did and update it and make the language modern. The whole thing doesn't make sense, because the tonal idiom doesn't play in the modern world. You have to separate it; you have to create that proscenium arch; you have to create poetic distance—otherwise there's no art in it."

When the series was announced in June 2000, Variety reported that A&E had been licensed to own Nero Wolfe in the U.S. and Canada for an undisclosed fee. Jaffe/Braunstein Films, which retained ownership of the series in the rest of the world, licensed distribution outside the U.S. to Pearson International Television (now FremantleMedia, Ltd.). Producer Michael Jaffe told Variety that the Nero Wolfe episodes would cost $1 million each; sources said the full production cost would be covered by A&E's and Pearson's licensing fees.

=== Writing ===
==== Adapting the stories ====
"It was a screenwriting assignment unlike any other that my writing partner, William Rabkin, and I had ever been involved with," wrote screenwriter Lee Goldberg, who adapted four Stout stories for the series. "Because Nero Wolfe, starring Maury Chaykin as Wolfe and Timothy Hutton as Archie, was unlike any other series on television. It was, as far as I know, the first TV series without a single original script — each and every episode was based on a Rex Stout novel, novella, or short story. ... The mandate from executive producers Michael Jaffe and Timothy Hutton (who also directed episodes) was to 'do the books,' even if that meant violating some of the hard-and-fast rules of screenwriting."

The filmmakers have remained as scrupulously faithful to the original stories as possible, even to the point of retaining the different time settings — this season's episodes have jumped from the 1940s to the 1960s and back without a care. ... What a stunner it is to find them translated so effectively to television.

— S. T. Karnick, National Review

"It's amazing how many writers got it wrong," said head writer Sharon Elizabeth Doyle.

I mean very good writers, too. Either you get it or you don't. It's so important to have the relationships right, and the tone of the relationships right, to get that it's about the language and not the story. The characters in these books aren't modern human beings. You have to believe in the characters and respect the formality of the way they are characterized.

Consulting producer for Nero Wolfe, Doyle was the show's only full-time writer — overseeing the work of freelance screenwriters and writing 11 of the teleplays herself. She devoted most of her attention to the dialogue:

What Stout writes actually sounds good when you say it out loud, but the stuff that makes you laugh out loud and fall on the floor in the books doesn't work most of the time when you transpose it directly into actors' mouths. Frequently I end up moving words — tenderly and respectfully — but retaining as much of the language as possible. I feel a great belief in Rex Stout. I see the script process as writing his second draft.

==== Relationship to literary source ====
In the preface to the second edition of his book At Wolfe's Door: The Nero Wolfe Novels of Rex Stout, J. Kenneth Van Dover assessed the fidelity of the show to its literary source:

A quarter century after his death, the Nero Wolfe books remain in print ... and, as a result of a very popular A&E television series which premiered in 2000, their continuing presence seems assured. ... The success of the series is significant especially because the scripts remained remarkably faithful to the novels. The programs are set in the period, and much of the dialogue is lifted directly from the novel. Effective novelistic dialogue is not usually effective screen dialogue, as Raymond Chandler discovered when he worked on the script for the 1944 film of James M. Cain's Double Indemnity. The A&E series was able to adopt verbatim both the sharp exchanges between Wolfe and Archie, and as well Archie's narration in voiceover. Credit certainly goes to the skills of the repertory actors who played the roles, and especially to Maury Chaykin and Timothy Hutton; but it was Stout who supplied the language and the characters who speak it. And it was Stout who created in words the real pleasures of the novels: the voices and ideas, the rooms and the routines. Producer Michael Jaffe realized this, and with great care recreated those pleasures on film.

Production of Nero Wolfe coincided with Rex Stout's becoming a top-selling author some 30 years after his death. BookFinder.com, a web-search service that reports the most-sought out-of-print titles, reported in March 2003 that the top four most-wanted mysteries were Nero Wolfe novels: Where There's a Will (1940), The Rubber Band (1936), The Red Box (1937) and The League of Frightened Men (1935). The Red Box was the most-searched mystery title in August 2003, and the novel remained as number two on the list in 2004. In 2006, Too Many Women (1947) was fifth on BookFinder.com's list of most-sought out-of-print thrillers, whodunits, classics and modern mystery titles. In 2007, The Black Mountain was in the number five position.

Most of the stories adapted for Nero Wolfe became available through Bantam's Rex Stout Library, a series of paperbacks that featured new introductions and memorabilia. Some of these, including The Doorbell Rang and Prisoner's Base, are emblazoned with the words, "as seen on TV." The Audio Partners Publishing Corporation promoted its bestselling line of Rex Stout audiobooks, unabridged on CD and audiocassette, "as seen on A&E TV."

=== Production design ===
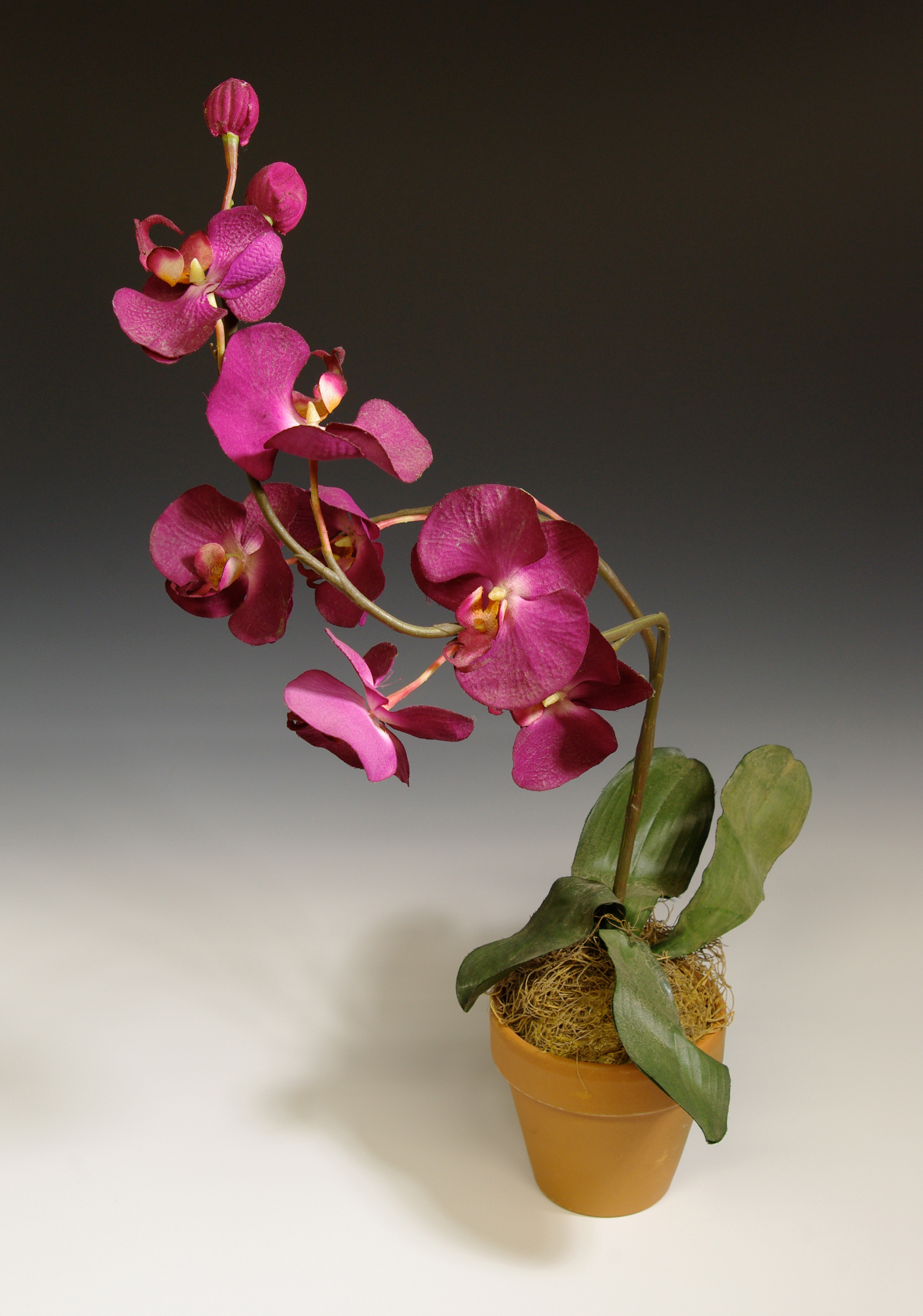
Silk orchid prop from Nero Wolfe

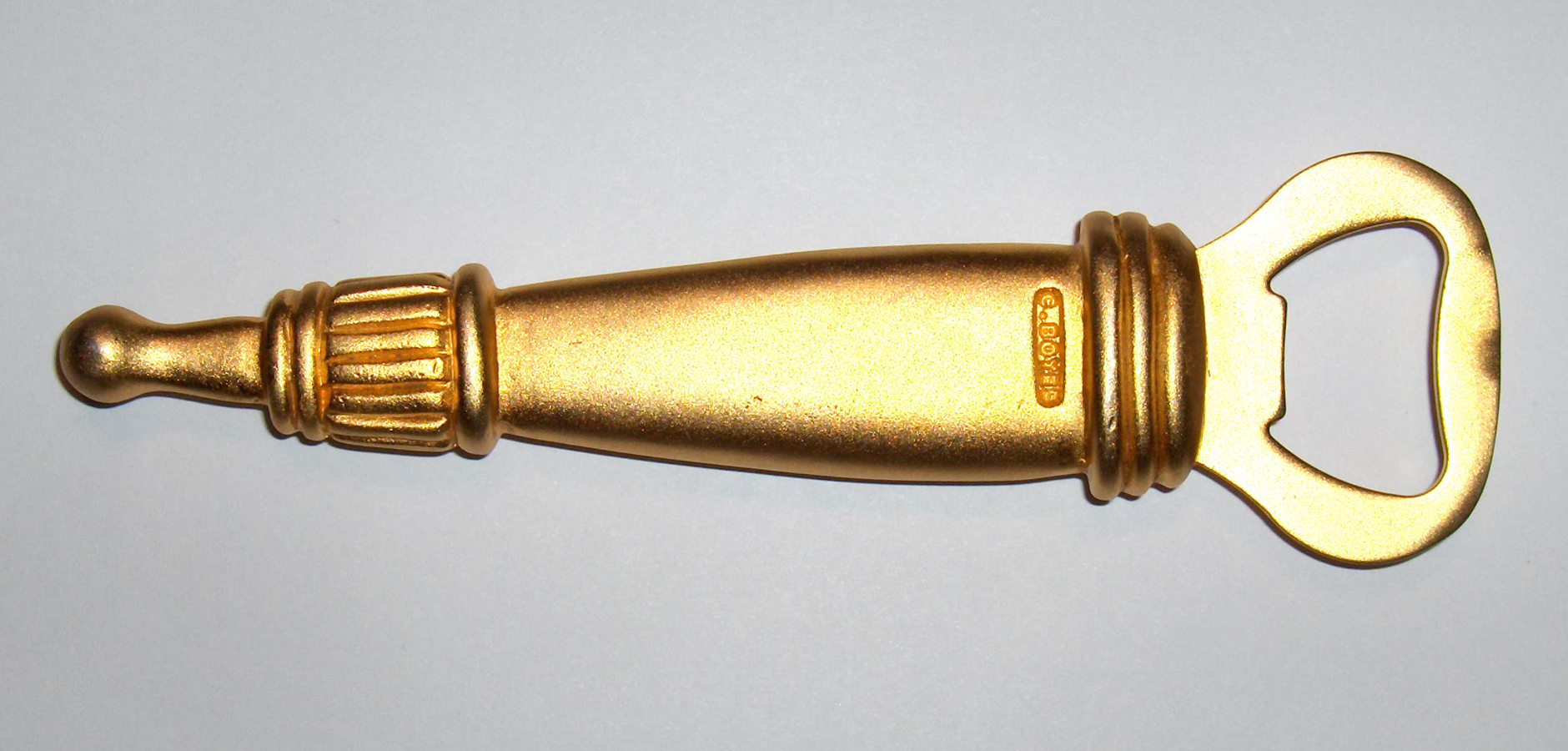
Gold plated bottle opener from Nero Wolfe

On the eve of the premiere of Nero Wolfe, The Hollywood Reporter credited "the incredible attention to detail paid by production designer Lindsey Hermer-Bell and set decorator Odetta Stoddard, who not only re-create the world Stout so carefully described but also impart an overall feeling of stylishness and taste."

Before building the sets Hermer-Bell read all of Rex Stout's Nero Wolfe stories and the companion volumes by William S. Baring-Gould and Ken Darby, and she created a complete floor plan to match the detailed descriptions of the brownstone found in the Nero Wolfe corpus.

"There are people who know all the books, and they know all these specifics, and if you screw up, you know, they get really upset ... so everything is as per written", Hermer-Bell said.

When A&E cancelled Nero Wolfe in 2002, executive producer Michael Jaffe estimated the value of the sets at $800,000. (Note: "This week we tore down $800,000 in sets", Michael Jaffe told Scarlet Street magazine.)

=== Cinematography ===
Derek Rogers was the director of photography for the first season of Nero Wolfe. John Berrie was director of photography for the second season, which was shot in high-definition video.

"Jaffe/Braunstein was one of the first to experiment with HD for television," reported the industry publication HiDef Magazine:

Their landmark series 100 Centre Street ... was one of the first hour dramas to use HDCam as the capture medium. ... Jaffe/Braunstein was also producing the A&E series Nero Wolfe with Timothy Hutton in 35mm film. After the success with HD, Michael [Jaffe] decided that he'd like to try it on the single camera hour drama. At first Hutton was a little nervous about it, but after Jaffe brought experienced DP John Berrie to the program, Hutton was convinced. The entire second season was shot in HD ...

=== Costume design ===
Nero Wolfe features costume design by Christopher Hargadon. Many costumes were found at vintage shops or in Hargadon's personal collection; some clothes were taken apart and reconstructed with new fabrics to capture the color required. For Wolfe, Hargadon said, "I tried to find fabrics that were thick, to sort of even enhance his size more, things that would be structured to hold a big shape." Hargadon estimated that he and his team created at least 1,000 costumes for each season.

=== Title design ===
Illustrator Aurore Giscard d'Estaing designed title sequences unique to each episode. The main title for the series is an illustration of Queensboro Bridge.

=== Music ===
Michael Small wrote the series theme — "Boss Boogie", first heard in the titles for "The Doorbell Rang" — and composed the original music heard in Nero Wolfe. Music producer Richard Martinez was scoring editor for Michael Small's compositions. Kevin Banks was music editor and also handled the production music. Martinez and Banks were nominated for a Golden Reel Award (Best Sound Editing in Television Long Form — Music) for the second-season premiere, "Death of a Doxy".

=== Cancellation ===
When A&E announced the cancellation of Nero Wolfe in August 2002, the network took the unusual step of posting an "Important Message" on its website: "We at A&E remain extremely proud of Nero Wolfe. It is a high quality, beautifully produced and entertaining show, unlike anything else currently on the television landscape. Although it performed moderately well amongst tough competition for two seasons, it simply did not do well enough for us to be able to go on making it, given the current television climate."

"I do know A&E's decision not to continue didn't have anything to do with ratings; it was their highest-rated series," Timothy Hutton told columnist Marilyn Beck in November 2002. Beck reported that Hutton would be happy to make one or two Nero Wolfe TV movies a year.

Maury Chaykin reflected on the cancellation of Nero Wolfe in a 2008 interview. "I'm a bit jaded and cynical about which shows succeed on television. I worked on a fantastic show once called Nero Wolfe, but at the time A&E was transforming from the premier intellectual cable network in America to one that airs Dog the Bounty Hunter on repeat, so it was never promoted and eventually went off the air." (Note: "After some initial advertising for the April second season premiere, A&E stopped publicizing the show," reported Scarlet Street magazine.)

== Episodes ==
The weekly series was preceded by the television film, The Golden Spiders: A Nero Wolfe Mystery, first broadcast March 5, 2000.

=== Season 1 ===
No. overall	No. in season	Title	Directed by	Written by	Teleplay	Original release date
1 2	1 2	"The Doorbell Rang"	Timothy Hutton	Michael Jaffe	1965 novel	April 22, 2001
Repertory and guest cast: Debra Monk (Mrs. Rachel Bruner), James Tolkan (Richard Wragg), Francie Swift (Sarah Dacos), Robert Bockstael (Timothy Quayle), Nicky Guadagni (Mrs. Ivana Althaus), Gretchen Egolf (Marian Hinckley), Aron Tager (Bernard Fromm), Steve Cumyn (Frank O'Dell), Hrant Alianak (Vincent Yarmack); Double-length episode A wealthy woman hires Wolfe to stop the FBI hounding her, leading Wolfe and Archie to investigate the murder of a journalist apparently working on an exposé of illegal FBI practices.
3	3	"Champagne for One – Part One"	Timothy Hutton	William Rabkin & Lee Goldberg	1958 novel	April 29, 2001
Repertory and guest cast: James Tolkan (Mr. Hackett), Marian Seldes (Mrs. Louise Grantham Robilotti), Kari Matchett (Celia Grantham), Nicky Guadagni (Elaine Usher), Kathryn Zenna (Helen Yarmis), Alex Poch-Goldin (Edwin Laidlaw), Robert Bockstael (Paul Schuster), Christine Brubaker (Rose Tuttle), Aron Tager (Commissioner Fromm), Steve Cumyn (Cecil Grantham), Boyd Banks (Austin "Dinky" Byne), David Schurmann (Robert Robilotti), Michael Rhoades (Beverly Kent), Janine Theriault (Ethel Varr), Patricia Zentilli (Faith Usher) During a party hosting unwed mothers, one of the guests dies suddenly of cyanide poisoning—leading to controversy and intrigue when Archie, alone of the attendees, insists that she was actually murdered.
4	4	"Champagne for One – Part Two"	Timothy Hutton	William Rabkin & Lee Goldberg	1958 novel	May 6, 2001
Repertory and guest cast: James Tolkan (Mr. Hackett), Marian Seldes (Mrs. Louise Grantham Robilotti), Kari Matchett (Celia Grantham), Nicky Guadagni (Elaine Usher), Kathryn Zenna (Helen Yarmis), Alex Poch-Goldin (Edwin Laidlaw), Robert Bockstael (Paul Schuster), Christine Brubaker (Rose Tuttle), Aron Tager (Commissioner Fromm), Steve Cumyn (Cecil Grantham), Boyd Banks (Austin "Dinky" Byne), David Schurmann (Robert Robilotti), Michael Rhoades (Beverly Kent), Janine Theriault (Ethel Varr), Patricia Zentilli (Faith Usher) During a party hosting unwed mothers, one of the guests dies suddenly of cyanide poisoning—leading to controversy and intrigue when Archie, alone of the attendees, insists that she was actually murdered.
5	5	"Prisoner's Base – Part One"	Neill Fearnley	William Rabkin & Lee Goldberg	1952 novel	May 13, 2001
Repertory and guest cast: James Tolkan (Bernard Quest), Ron Rifkin (Perry Helmar), Kari Matchett (Sarah Jaffee), Shauna Black (Priscilla Eads), Robert Bockstael (District Attorney T. Bowen), Nicky Guadagni (Viola Duday), Bill MacDonald (Lieutenant Rowcliff), Dina Barrington (Daphne O'Neill), Aron Tager (Commissioner Skinner), Steve Cumyn (Eric Hagh), Gary Reineke (Oliver Pitkin), Hrant Alianak (Nathaniel Parker), David Schurmann (Jay Brucker), Wayne Best (Albert Irby) A young heiress creates a stir for Wolfe and Archie when she mysteriously requests to stay in the brownstone for a week before her birthday, only to be murdered soon after Wolfe orders her to leave.
6	6	"Prisoner's Base – Part Two"	Neill Fearnley	William Rabkin & Lee Goldberg	1952 novel	May 20, 2001
Repertory and guest cast: James Tolkan (Bernard Quest), Ron Rifkin (Perry Helmar), Kari Matchett (Sarah Jaffee), Shauna Black (Priscilla Eads), Robert Bockstael (District Attorney T. Bowen), Nicky Guadagni (Viola Duday), Bill MacDonald (Lieutenant Rowcliff), Dina Barrington (Daphne O'Neill), Aron Tager (Commissioner Skinner), Steve Cumyn (Eric Hagh), Gary Reineke (Oliver Pitkin), Hrant Alianak (Nathaniel Parker), David Schurmann (Jay Brucker), Wayne Best (Albert Irby) A young heiress creates a stir for Wolfe and Archie when she mysteriously requests to stay in the brownstone for a week before her birthday, only to be murdered soon after Wolfe orders her to leave.
7	7	"Eeny Meeny Murder Moe"	John L'Ecuyer	Sharon Elizabeth Doyle	1962 story	June 3, 2001
Repertory cast: George Plimpton (Lamont Otis), Kari Matchett (Rita Sorell), Robert Bockstael (Gregory Jett), Christine Brubaker (Bertha Aaron), Janine Theriault (Angela Paige), David Schurmann (Miles Heydecker), Wayne Best (Frank Edey); Linked with "Disguise for Murder" into a feature-length episode (1 hour 30 minutes) titled "Wolfe Stays In", broadcast outside the U.S. and Canada A secretary for a prominent law firm is strangled in Wolfe's office with his own necktie after coming to him for help, leading a furious Wolfe and Archie to tangle with possibly corrupt lawyers and a seductive actress seeking a divorce to find the killer.
8	8	"Disguise for Murder"	John L'Ecuyer	Sharon Elizabeth Doyle	1950 story	June 17, 2001
Repertory cast: James Tolkan (W.J.), Debra Monk (Mrs. Carlisle), Kathryn Zenna (Cynthia Brown), Aron Tager (Mr. Carlisle), Nicholas Campbell (Colonel Percy Brown), Nancy Beatty (Mrs. Orwin), Philip Craig (Gene Orwin), Beau Starr (Malcolm Vedder), Richard Waugh (Dr. Morley), Ken Kramer (Dr. Vollmer); Linked with "Eeny Meeny Murder Moe" into a feature-length episode (1 hour 30 minutes) titled "Wolfe Stays In", broadcast outside the U.S. and Canada Wolfe opens his orchid rooms to the public, but quickly regrets it when a young confidence trickster is murdered in his office moments after revealing to Archie that she has identified a murderer among the visitors.
9	9	"Door to Death"	Holly Dale	Sharon Elizabeth Doyle	1949 story	June 24, 2001
Repertory and guest cast: James Tolkan (Joseph Pitcairn), Marian Seldes (Mrs. Pitcairn), Kari Matchett (Lily Rowan), Nicholas Campbell (Andy Krasicki), Beau Starr (Lieutenant Noonan), Ken Kramer (Neil Imbrie), Kristin Booth (Dini Lauer), Christine Brubaker (Sybil Pitcairn), Boyd Banks (Donald Pitcairn), Nancy Beatty (Vera Imbrie), Steve Cumyn (Gus Treble); Linked with "Christmas Party" into a feature-length episode (1 hour 30 minutes) titled "Wolfe Goes Out", broadcast outside the U.S. and Canada Wolfe's hunt for a temporary replacement for his gardener leads him and Archie to a remote mansion where, in the greenhouse, a young woman has been gassed to death.
10	10	"Christmas Party"	Holly Dale	Sharon Elizabeth Doyle	1957 story	July 1, 2001
Repertory and guest cast: Kari Matchett (Lily Rowan), Francie Swift (Margot Dickey), M. J. Kang (Cherry Quon), David Schurmann (Alfred Kiernan), Richard Waugh (Emil Hatch), Jodi Racicot (Leo Jerome), Nicky Guadagni (Mrs. Perry Porter Jerome), Robert Bockstael (Kurt Bottweil); Linked with "Door to Death" into a feature-length episode (1 hour 30 minutes) titled "Wolfe Goes Out", broadcast outside the U.S. and Canada When Archie reveals he's getting married as a prank, the resulting tension between him and Wolfe leads to both men becoming involved in a Christmas party where the host is poisoned.
11	11	"Over My Dead Body – Part One"	Timothy Hutton	Janet Roach	1940 novel	July 8, 2001
Repertory cast: Ron Rifkin (Nikola Miltan), James Tolkan (Percy Ludlow), George Plimpton (John Barrett), Kari Matchett (Carla Lovchen), Debra Monk (Madame Zorka), Francie Swift (Neya Tormic), Robert Bockstael (Agent Stahl), Nicky Guadagni (Jeanne Miltan), Hrant Alianak (Nat Driscoll), Richard Waugh (Rudolph Faber), Dina Barrington (Belinda Reade), Boyd Banks (Duncan Barrett) A young immigrant claiming to be Wolfe's long-lost adopted daughter approaches him for help in clearing her name of a theft charge, but a murder at the fencing studio where she works uncovers international intrigue that she may be involved in.
12	12	"Over My Dead Body – Part Two"	Timothy Hutton	Janet Roach	1940 novel	July 15, 2001
Repertory cast: Ron Rifkin (Nikola Miltan), James Tolkan (Percy Ludlow), George Plimpton (John Barrett), Kari Matchett (Carla Lovchen), Debra Monk (Madame Zorka), Francie Swift (Neya Tormic), Robert Bockstael (Agent Stahl), Nicky Guadagni (Jeanne Miltan), Hrant Alianak (Nat Driscoll), Richard Waugh (Rudolph Faber), Dina Barrington (Belinda Reade), Boyd Banks (Duncan Barrett) A young immigrant claiming to be Wolfe's long-lost adopted daughter approaches him for help in clearing her name of a theft charge, but a murder at the fencing studio where she works uncovers international intrigue that she may be involved in.

=== Season 2 ===
No. overall	No. in season	Title	Directed by	Written by	Teleplay	Original release date
13 14	1 2	"Death of a Doxy"	Timothy Hutton	Sharon Elizabeth Doyle	1966 novel	April 14, 2002
Repertory cast: Kari Matchett (Julie Jaquette, Lily Rowan), James Tolkan (Avery Ballou), Christine Brubaker (Stella Fleming), Carlo Rota (Barry Fleming), Nicky Guadagni (Mrs. Ballou), Hayley Verlyn (Isabel Kerr), Janine Theriault (Jill Hardy), George Plimpton (Nathaniel Parker), Julian Richings (Poet) When doing a favor for another detective, Archie discovers the murdered body of a young dancer with whom the detective was involved, and the quest to clear his name uncovers a web of blackmail and secrets.
15	3	"The Next Witness"	James Tolkan	Sharon Elizabeth Doyle	1955 story	April 21, 2002
Repertory and guest cast: Christine Brubaker (Bella Velardi), Robert Bockstael (Jimmy Donovan), Nicky Guadagni (Alice Hart), Richard Waugh (Guy Unger), David Schurmann (Leonard Ashe), Boyd Banks (Clyde Bagby), Wayne Best (District Attorney Mandelbaum), Francie Swift (Helen Weltz), Beau Starr (Judge Corbett), Rebecca Jenkins (Robina Keane), Kathryn Zenna (Pearl Fleming), Hrant Alianak (Coroner); Double-length episode (1 hour 30 minutes) broadcast outside the U.S. and Canada After being summoned to testify in a murder trial, Wolfe hears testimony that makes him realize the defendant has been framed, leading him and Archie to risk arrest to clear the man's name.
16	4	"Die Like a Dog"	James Tolkan	Sharon Elizabeth Doyle	1954 story	April 28, 2002
Repertory cast: Kari Matchett (Jewel Jones), James Tolkan (Loftus the dog expert), Steve Cumyn (Ross Chaffee), Julian Richings (Jerome Aland), Bill MacDonald (Richard Meegan), Alex Poch-Goldin (Victor Talento) When Archie is followed home by a stray dog, Wolfe begins to take a liking to the animal—only to discover that it is a key witness in a murder.
17	5	"Murder Is Corny"	George Bloomfield	William Rabkin & Lee Goldberg	1964 story	May 5, 2002
Repertory and guest cast: David Calderisi (Carl Heydt), George Plimpton (Nathaniel Parker), Robert Bockstael (Max Marow), Bruce McFee (Duncan McLeod), Julian Richings (Peter Jay), Kari Matchett (Susan McLeod) A late delivery of corn to Wolfe's house turns out to be the least of Archie's problems when he is framed for murdering the delivery man.
18	6	"Motherhunt – Part One"	Alan Smithee	Sharon Elizabeth Doyle	1963 novel	May 12, 2002
19	7	"Motherhunt – Part Two"	Alan Smithee	Sharon Elizabeth Doyle	1963 novel	May 19, 2002
Repertory and guest cast: Penelope Ann Miller (Lucy Valdon), Richard Waugh (Manuel Upton), Boyd Banks (Willis Krug), Steve Cumyn (Julian Haft), Shannon Jobe (Miss Mimm), Griffin Dunne (Nicolas Losseff), Brooke Burns (Beatrice Epps), Erinn Bartlett (Anne Tenzer), Carrie Fisher (Ellen Tenzer), James Tolkan (Leo Bingham), Manon von Gerkan (Sally Corbett), Kathryn Zenna (Carol Mardus) A widow hires Wolfe to determine whether or not a baby left on her doorstep was fathered by her late husband, only for Wolfe to find himself on the run when murder results from the investigation.
20	8	"Poison à la Carte"	George Bloomfield	William Rabkin & Lee Goldberg	1960 story	May 26, 2002
Repertory and guest cast: Hrant Alianak (Zoltan Mahany), Carlo Rota (Felix Courbet), David Hemblen (Louis Hewitt), Dominic Cuzzocrea (Vincent Pyle), James Tolkan (Adrian Dart), David Schurmann (Emil Kreis), Gary Reineke (Mr. Leacraft), Jack Newman (Mr. Schriver), Michelle Nolden (Helen Iacono), Emily Hampshire (Carol Annis), Hayley Verlyn (Fern Faber), Sarain Boylan (Nora Jaret), Dina Barrington (Lucy Morgan], Lindy Booth (Peggy Choate); Double-length episode (1 hour 30 minutes) broadcast outside the U.S. and Canada Wolfe's chef Fritz is asked to cook for an elite club of epicures, but when one of the guests is poisoned with arsenic suspicion turns to one of the beautiful serving girls.
21	9	"Too Many Clients – Part One"	John L'Ecuyer	Sharon Elizabeth Doyle	1960 novel	June 2, 2002
22	10	"Too Many Clients – Part Two"	John L'Ecuyer	Sharon Elizabeth Doyle	1960 novel	June 9, 2002
Repertory and guest cast: Bill MacDonald (Austin Hough), Marty Moreau (Cabbie), Jeannette Sousa (Maria Perez), Alex Poch-Goldin (Cesar Perez), Lucy Filippone (Mrs. Perez), Kari Matchett (Meg Duncan), Christine Brubaker (Julia McGee), James Tolkan (Benedict Aiken), Debra Monk (Mrs. Yeager), Dina Barrington (Dinah Hough), Michael Sarrazin (Thomas Yeager, uncredited) A man calling himself Thomas Yeager hires Archie to determine whether he is being followed, only for the real Yeager to be found murdered hours later—and the investigation will uncover blackmail, hedonism and a deluge of potential clients for Wolfe.
23	11	"Before I Die"	John L'Ecuyer	Sharon Elizabeth Doyle	1947 story	June 16, 2002
Repertory and guest cast: Christine Brubaker (Violet Perrit), Seymour Cassel (Dazy Perrit), Lindy Booth (Beulah Page), Joe Pingue (Archie 2), Ken Kramer (L.A. Schwartz), Doug Lennox (Fabian), Bill MacDonald (Lieutenant Rowcliff), Matthew Edison (Morton Schane), Beau Starr (Thumbs Meeker), Nicky Guadagni (Fabian's Girl), Angela Maiorano (Archie 2's Girl); Double-length episode (1 hour 30 minutes) broadcast outside the U.S. and Canada A ruthless bootlegger hires Wolfe to stop a woman posing as his illegitimate daughter from blackmailing him—but when she's gunned down in the street, it turns out the bootlegger has enemies from directions that he wasn't expecting.
24	12	"Help Wanted, Male"	John L'Ecuyer	Mark Stein	1945 story	June 30, 2002
Repertory and guest cast: James Tolkan (Ben Jenson), Richard Waugh (Major Emil Jensen), George Plimpton (General Carpenter), Robert Bockstael (Colonel Dickey), Steve Cumyn (Peter Root), Kari Matchett (Jane Geer), Larry Drake (Hackett), Randy Butcher (Doyle) When Wolfe receives a threatening letter soon after a previous client—who received a similar letter—is murdered, he hires a body double to lure out the assassin.
25	13	"The Silent Speaker – Part One"	Michael Jaffe	Michael Jaffe	1946 novel	July 14, 2002
26	14	"The Silent Speaker – Part Two"	Michael Jaffe	Michael Jaffe	1946 novel	July 21, 2002
Repertory and guest cast: Debra Monk (Mrs. Boone), Cynthia Watros (Phoebe Gunther), Joe Flaherty (Dr. Vollmer), George Plimpton (Winterhoff), James Tolkan (FBI Agent Richard Wragg), David Schurmann (Frank Erskine), Christine Brubaker (Hattie Harding), Bill MacDonald (Breslow), Matthew Edison (Edward Erskine), Nicky Guadagni (Mrs. Cramer, Secretary), Richard Waugh (Don O'Neill), Manon von Gerkan (Nina Boone), Julian Richings (Alger Kates), Robert Bockstael (Solomon Dexter), Gary Reineke (Hombert), Steve Cumyn (Skinner), Doug Lennox (Inspector Ash) A prominent government official is murdered at dinner event hosted by a business organization he publicly opposed, leading the organization to hire Wolfe to clear its name.
27	15	"Cop Killer"	John R. Pepper	Jennifer Salt	1951 story	August 11, 2002
Repertory and guest cast: Kari Matchett (Janet Stahl), Nicky Guadagni (Tina Vardas), Hrant Alianak (Carl Vardas), James Tolkan (Ed Graboff), Boyd Banks (Jimmie Kirk), Ken Kramer (Joel Fickler), Robbie Rox (Philip), Angelo Tsarouchas (Flatfoot Cop), Doug Lennox (Detective Jacob Wallen) Two illegal immigrants come to Wolfe and Archie for help after a police officer arrives at the barbershop where they work, only for things to become a lot more complicated when the police officer is murdered soon after they leave.
28	16	"Immune to Murder"	John R. Pepper	Stuart Kaminsky	1955 story	August 18, 2002
Repertory and guest cast: David Schurmann (O.V. Bragan), Robert Bockstael (David Leeson), Carlo Rota (Spiros Papps), Susannah Hoffmann (Sally Leeson), Giancarlo Esposito (Ambassador Theodore Kelefy), Seymour Cassel (James Arthur Ferris), Manon von Gerkan (Adria Kelefy), George Plimpton (Cook), Richard Waugh (Capt. Jasper Colvin), Matthew Edison (Nate the Trooper), Steve Cumyn (D.A. Herman Jasper); Double-length episode (1 hour 30 minutes) broadcast outside the U.S. and Canada As part of a diplomatic negotiation, Wolfe is asked to cook a meal for a recently arrived foreign ambassador, only for a high-ranking State Department official to be murdered while fishing.

== Broadcast ==
=== United States and Canada ===
Distributed by the A&E Television Networks in the United States and Canada, Nero Wolfe first aired on the A&E Network April 22, 2001. The second season premiered April 14, 2002. The series ran Sundays at 8 p.m. ET and was rebroadcast at midnight. The last original broadcast was Sunday, August 18, 2002. Nero Wolfe continued to air regularly in repeat through 2002 and sporadically in early 2003 before leaving the A&E schedule altogether. (Note: "The Doorbell Rang" aired Sunday, December 29, 2002. In 2003, A&E presented "The Golden Spiders" February 23, and "Death of a Doxy" February 20 and April 13.)

From March 2004 to May 2006, Nero Wolfe appeared Saturdays at 8 p.m. ET on another of the A&E Networks, The Biography Channel.

=== International ===
FremantleMedia, Ltd., distributes the show outside the U.S. and Canada. The series has been broadcast on public and commercial networks, cable television and satellite systems throughout the world, and was presented throughout Europe and Africa on the Hallmark Channel. (Note: Hallmark Channel international sites in April 2003 recorded episodes of both seasons of the show airing in 36 countries: Angola, Belgium, Benin, Burkina Faso, Burundi, Cameroon, Central African Republic, Czech Republic, Denmark, Equatorial Guinea, Finland, Gabon, Ghana, Guinea, Iceland, Ivory Coast, Kenya, Madagascar, Mali, Mozambique, Netherlands, Niger, Nigeria, Norway, Rwanda, Sao Tome & Principe, Slovakia, South Africa, Swaziland, Sweden, Tanzania, Togo, Tunisia, Uganda, Zambia and Zimbabwe.)

- Australia, Australian Broadcasting Corporation
- Australia, Movie Plus
- Estonia, Kanal 2, as Nero Wolfe
- Finland, Yle, as Nero Wolfe
- France, Paris Première, as Les Enquêtes de Nero Wolfe
- Israel, Hot
- Italy, Mediaset (Rete 4), as Nero Wolfe
- Japan, Movie Plus
- Japan, WOWOW
- Lithuania, Lietuvos Televizija, as Detektyvas Niras Vulfas
- Mexico, Televisa, as Un Misterio de Nero Wolfe
- Poland, Polsat
- Portugal, Rádio e Televisão de Portugal, as Um Mistério de Nero Wolfe
- Romania, Naţional TV
- Turkey, Digiturk
- UK, BBC Two, as The Nero Wolfe Mysteries
- UK, Sky Movies

== Reception ==
=== Ratings ===
I do know A&E's decision not to continue didn't have anything to do with ratings; it was their highest-rated series.

— Timothy Hutton

In its debut season on A&E, A Nero Wolfe Mystery averaged a 1.9 rating. The first three weeks (April 14–28, 2002) of the second season of Nero Wolfe averaged a solid 1.9 rating in cable homes. Nero Wolfe had averaged a 1.7 rating for the month of May 2002, while viewing levels for the A&E Network overall were 1.1. In mid-June 2002 Multichannel News wrote, "Nero Wolfe, in its second cycle of episodes, is drawing solid ratings in the 1.5 to 2.0 Nielsen Media Research range". The A&E Network as a whole ended 2002 with a 1.0 rating. A Nero Wolfe Mystery was one of the Top 10 Basic Cable Dramas for 2002. (Note: In rank order, the top 10 basic cable dramas for 2002 were Monk, The Dead Zone, The Shield, Strong Medicine, The Division, Any Day Now, Witchblade, For the People, Stargate, and Nero Wolfe.)

=== Awards ===
- 2002, Nominee, Edgar Award
  Best Television Episode
  Lee Goldberg and William Rabkin, "Prisoner's Base"
  Mystery Writers of America
- 2002, Nominee, DGC Craft Award
  Outstanding Achievement in Direction
  Holly Dale, "Christmas Party"
  Directors Guild of Canada
- 2002, Nominee, DGC Craft Award
  Outstanding Achievement in Picture Editing
  Stephen Lawrence, "The Doorbell Rang"
  Directors Guild of Canada
- 2003, Nominee, Golden Reel Award
  Best Sound Editing in Television Long Form — Music
  Kevin Banks and Richard Martinez, "Death of a Doxy"
  Motion Picture Sound Editors
- 2003, Nominee, ACTRA Toronto Award
  Maury Chaykin, Outstanding Performance – Male
  Kari Matchett, Outstanding Performance – Female
  Alliance of Canadian Cinema, Television and Radio Artists

=== Reviews and commentary ===
- John Leonard, New York Magazine (April 16, 2001) — Imperious and mysterious, Rex Stout's Nero Wolfe was always a natural for television. Finally, A&E got him right.
- Diane Holloway, Cox News Service (April 20, 2001) — The music is big-band smooth, the cars are shiny with tail fins and the dialogue is snappy, almost musical. At times conversations sound like fingers rhythmically popping. ... The antithesis of today's gritty cop dramas, A&E's new Nero Wolfe series is slick and classy. Nobody spinning the dial will mistake the lavish sets, fabulous period costumes and moody lighting for NYPD Blue. The camera doesn't jiggle; it glides.
- John Levesque, Seattle Post-Intelligencer (April 20, 2001) — Like so many characters in noir-ish films of the 1940s and 1950s, Wolfe and Goodwin are ebulliently over the top: loud, proud and full of themselves. It's a bit much for anyone expecting the less theatrical performances of today. And yet it fits remarkably well with today's reality programming. Wolfe, after all, is ruder than anyone on Survivor.
- Howard Rosenberg, Los Angeles Times (April 20, 2001) — A witty, beguiling, colorful, pulse-pounding hoot of a weekly series set in the '50s ... The greatest of fun ... From straw hat to natty black-and-white wingtips, Archie is the swaggering, milk-drinking, street-savvy legman of this unequal union, Wolfe the cultured closer who rakes in big fees while rarely venturing outdoors on business. The "oversized genius," as Archie irreverently titles him, is 275 pounds of authoritarian harrumph packed into a custom-made three-piece suit. A derrick couldn't budge him from that ornately furnished brownstone, where he is an antique among antiques, hovering over his personal chef while cultivating his gourmandise ("I must see about those cutlets") as assiduously as he does his beloved orchids in a glassed-in plant room. ... Archie is the only man on TV who wears a snap-brim hat like he means it.
- Julie Salamon, The New York Times (April 20, 2001) — The charming A&E series is an expansion of last year's Nero Wolfe movie special, starring Maury Chaykin as the massive Wolfe and Timothy Hutton as skinny Archie Goodwin, his investigator and sidekick. ... This actor has retained his lanky boyishness. Sometimes his big-shouldered, baggy suits seem to be gliding along by themselves.
- Alan Johnson, The Columbus Dispatch (April 22, 2001) — The series is actually better than the movie—stylish, well-acted and backed by a compelling retro-jazz theme ... What it lacks in shoot'em-up action, Nero Wolfe makes up for in style.
- David Kronke, The Daily News of Los Angeles (April 22, 2001) — Nero Wolfe, alas, is undone by uneven performances and a sense that it's more witty and urbane than it really is. Hutton is too antic — he seems to be playing the sassy newsroom copy boy in a '30s B-picture — and his narration tries far too hard to push jokes that just aren't funny. Maury Chaykin, a normally reliable character actor, is alternately flat or rudderlessly blustery as Wolfe.
- Laura Urbani, Pittsburgh Tribune-Review (April 22, 2001) — Hutton has found a series of which he can be proud. Most actors would kill to be a part of such a witty and classy production.
- James Vance, Tulsa World (April 22, 2001) — Stout's books are mysteries, but they're invariably more about the people involved than the mysteries themselves. Hutton, an Academy Award-winning actor (for 1980's Ordinary People), is ideal casting for Archie, and the lesser-known Chaykin is a surprisingly satisfactory choice to flesh out the combination of growls and tics that make up Nero Wolfe. To that mix Hutton and his partners in production have added the concept of repertory casting that will see the same nucleus of performers returning in different roles each week.
- Frazier Moore, Associated Press (May 3, 2001) — Fast-paced and stylish, there's no mystery why it's so much fun to watch. ... The series' look is bright and plushly appointed. The music swings like a night at the Stork Club.
- Gene Amole, Rocky Mountain News (May 11, 2001) — Maury Chaykin is perfect as Wolfe, and Timothy Hutton, who also produces and directs the series, is the ideal Archie. Somehow, they have reproduced with unerring accuracy Wolfe's four-story brownstone mansion ... What wonderful, campy scripts!
- Don Dale, Style Weekly (May 21, 2001) — Maury Chaykin makes an excellent Nero Wolfe in A&E's new series based on Stout's books. And Timothy Hutton is nicely cast as Goodwin. ... The soundtrack of the series gets an A+: It's full of hot '30s and '40s club jazz. So do the writers, especially for capturing the exquisite subtleties of the complex relationship between Wolfe and Goodwin, most often expressed in the conversational games they're so fond of—and so good at.
- Molly Haskell, The New York Observer (December 23, 2001) — The A&E television show based on Rex Stout's mystery novels, with Timothy Hutton and Maury Chaykin, is a class act, a witty and playful take on the 30s that never overdoes it.
- Martin Sieff, United Press International (December 25, 2001) — The great veteran actor Maury Chaykin was born to play Nero. And Timothy Hutton is equally perfect as his leg-man and always squabbling employee/amanuensis/Dr. Watson/Captain Hastings sidekick, Archie Goodwin. ... Hutton, an Oscar winner, and Chaykin are at the heart of it all. They have done many prestigious things in their careers and no doubt will do many more. But it is clear they know they will never have more fun than doing this.
- Robert Bianco, USA Today (April 12, 2002) — For reasons I can't explain, A&E is dedicated to preserving Nero Wolfe, its thuddingly mediocre series starring Timothy Hutton and Maury Chaykin as Rex Stout's famed detective team. The stars are miscast, the production is chintzy and the books defy adaptation, but A&E keeps plugging.
- S. T. Karnick, National Review (May 10, 2002) — Timothy Hutton, who also serves as executive producer for the show, is just brilliant as Archie Goodwin, managing to express the gumshoe's toughness (which I had been rather skeptical of his ability to do) as effectively as he shows his moral strength and emotional complexity. ... Chaykin quite simply is Nero Wolfe, playing the role with impressive confidence and subtlety.
- Jonathan Storm, Pittsburgh Post-Gazette (June 11, 2002) — One of TV's most stylish shows.
- John Doyle, The Globe and Mail (July 12, 2002) — An absolute delight ... What's fun here is that everybody is having a great time with the arch dialogue, fabulous clothes and general silliness. It's all done with such flair and good humour that you can't help being absorbed. Most of the guys are "saps," all of the women are "dames" and, as Archie Goodwin, Timothy Hutton obviously adores saying things like, "The hell of it was, she was beautiful."
- Terry Teachout, National Review (August 12, 2002) — Chaykin and Hutton are as good in tandem as they are separately, for they understand that the Wolfe books are less mystery stories than domestic comedies, the continuing saga of two iron-willed codependents engaged in an endless game of one-upmanship. ... At least half the fun of the Wolfe books comes from the way in which Stout plays this struggle for laughs, and Chaykin and Hutton make the most of it, sniping at each other with naughty glee.
- Carey Henderson, Speakeasy (November 5, 2002) — Timothy Hutton, along with the ever pompous Maury Chaykin, stars in—and directs—this amazing weekly 'who done it' on A&E. ... Wolfe takes us back to a time (or maybe just transports us to a new one) where television could be good. The bad guys lose, the good guys win, and the suits are sharper than a razor.
- Robert Fidgeon, Herald Sun (November 12, 2003) — For those who enjoy stylish, well-written and superbly performed television, you won't get much better than this series.
- Tom Keogh, Amazon.com (2004) — The Complete First Season includes all the pleasures and surprises of the show's first mysteries, above all the tempestuous, symbiotic, and highly entertaining relationship between Wolfe (Maury Chaykin), a corpulent recluse who grows orchids and analyzes clues from a distance, and the acerbic knight-errant, Goodwin (Timothy Hutton, also an executive producer on the series), Wolfe's underpaid eyes and ears on the world. Hutton also directs the two-part "Champagne for One" with a snap and verve reminiscent of old Howard Hawks comedies, but it is on "Prisoner's Base" that all of the series' best elements are firing at once ... All in all, Nero Wolfe refreshes the television detective genre.
- Stephen Lackey, Cinegeek (2004) — Take one part Crime Story, one part Sherlock Holmes, and a lot of smart quick-witted and sarcastic humor and you have A&E's gone-before-its-time television adaptation of Nero Wolfe. I can't recommend this series enough.
- Michael Rogers, Library Journal (December 2004) — A&E's Nero Wolfe is so good, it's criminal. Highly recommended.
- Stuart Kaminsky, Publishers Weekly (December 19, 2005) — I ended up writing the last episode, "Immune to Murder," based on one of Rex Stout's short stories. I thought it was a terrific series, by the way. I don't know for sure why it didn't continue.
- Steve Lewis, Mystery*File (February 5, 2009) — The finest TV series ever based on the works of an American mystery writer.

== Media information ==
=== United States and Canada ===
"Nero Wolfe is a beautifully shot series, and its release on DVD is frequently stunning," wrote DVD Talk's Adam Tyner in his comprehensive review of A&E Home Video's "Nero Wolfe: The Complete Classic Whodunit Series":

I didn't feel at all as if I'd been watching a television show. For one, a number of the adaptations are feature-length, and the eye-catching cinematography, set design, and period costuming lean more towards a feature film than a basic cable television series. ... I didn't watch Nero Wolfe so much as devour it, and that this is such a rewatchable series makes it especially worth owning on DVD. ... It's worth mentioning that these DVDs present the episodes as they appeared on A&E, and although longer versions aired overseas (several were literally twice as long), none of that additional footage is offered here. ... Expertly crafted, masterfully acted, and unlike much of anything else on television, this collection of the entire two season run of Nero Wolfe is very highly recommended.

The feature-length series pilot, The Golden Spiders, was included on two of A&E's DVD box sets — "Nero Wolfe: The Complete Classic Whodunit Series" and "Nero Wolfe: The Complete Second Season." These two box sets also included a 22-minute behind-the-scenes film, "The Making of Nero Wolfe," as well as a bonus 16:9 widescreen version of "The Silent Speaker," written and directed by Michael Jaffe. All of the other episodes were offered in 4:3 pan and scan format. There were no foreign language subtitles, but the releases included English closed captions.

"The episodes look excellent — clear and colorful — in their broadcast full-frame presentation," wrote Scarlet Street magazine. "The extras are skimpy to the point of frustration, however. ... For that matter, why is "The Silent Speaker" the only episode presented in widescreen format?" (Note: "There isn't anything collected in this box set besides the episodes themselves, plus bios and filmographies for Hutton and Chaykin," Vitaris wrote in her earlier review of the first-season DVD set. "No commentaries, no interviews, no behind-the-scenes footage, no info about Rex Stout and his work. Nothing.")

In 2014 the first season of Nero Wolfe was reissued by A&E's new distribution partner, Lions Gate Entertainment. Previous releases via New Video Group are out of print. The series is not yet available for streaming in North America.

Title	Media type	Release date	Approximate length	ISBN
The Golden Spiders: A Nero Wolfe Mystery	VHS videotape (NTSC)	May 30, 2000	94 minutes	ISBN 0-7670-2551-2
The Doorbell Rang: A Nero Wolfe Mystery	VHS videotape (NTSC)	August 20, 2001	100 minutes	ISBN 0-7670-3766-9
Nero Wolfe: The Complete First Season	Region 1 DVD; Three-disc box set (Note: Features of Nero Wolfe: The Complete First Season include the following. Disc 1: "The Doorbell Rang," "Champagne for One" parts 1 + 2. Disc 2: "Prisoner's Base" parts 1 + 2, "Eeny Meeny Murder Moe," "Disguise for Murder." Disc 3: "Door to Death," "Christmas Party," "Over My Dead Body" parts 1 + 2.)	July 27, 2004 (Note: Actually released in June 2003 for exclusive sale by A&E Store and select outlets)	10 hours	ISBN 0-7670-5499-7
The Golden Spiders: A Nero Wolfe Mystery	Region 1 DVD+R (A&E Store exclusive)	October 2004	94 minutes	ISBN 0-7670-6719-3
The Doorbell Rang: A Nero Wolfe Mystery	Region 1 DVD+R (A&E Store exclusive)	October 2004	100 minutes	ISBN 0-7670-6721-5
Nero Wolfe: The Complete Second Season	Region 1 DVD; Five-disc box set (Note: Features of Nero Wolfe: The Complete Second Season include the following. Disc 1: "Death of a Doxy" double episode (one set of titles and credits), "The Next Witness," "Die Like a Dog." Disc 2: "Murder Is Corny," "Motherhunt" double episode, "Poison à la Carte." Disc 3: "Too Many Clients" double episode, "Before I Die," "Help Wanted, Male." Disc 4: "The Silent Speaker" double episode, "Cop Killer," "Immune to Murder." Disc 8: "The Golden Spiders," "The Making of Nero Wolfe," "The Silent Speaker" double episode in 16:9 letterbox format.)	June 28, 2005 (Note: Actually released in June 2004 for exclusive sale by A&E Store and select outlets)	13 hours, 20 minutes	ISBN 0-7670-5508-X
Nero Wolfe: The Complete Classic; Whodunit Series	Region 1 DVD; Eight-disc box set (Note: Features of Nero Wolfe: The Complete Classic Whodunit Series include the following. Disc 1: "The Doorbell Rang," "Champagne for One" parts 1 + 2. Disc 2: "Prisoner's Base" parts 1 + 2, "Eeny Meeny Murder Moe," "Disguise for Murder." Disc 3: "Door to Death," "Christmas Party," "Over My Dead Body" parts 1 + 2. Disc 4: "Death of a Doxy" double episode (one set of titles and credits), "The Next Witness," "Die Like a Dog." Disc 5: "Murder Is Corny," "Motherhunt" double episode, "Poison à la Carte." Disc 6: "Too Many Clients" double episode, "Before I Die," "Help Wanted, Male." Disc 7: "The Silent Speaker" double episode, "Cop Killer," "Immune to Murder." Disc 8: "The Golden Spiders," "The Making of Nero Wolfe," "The Silent Speaker" double episode in 16:9 letterbox format.)	April 25, 2006	24 hours, 56 minutes + extras	ISBN 0-7670-8893-X
Nero Wolfe: The Complete First Season	Region 1 DVD; Three-disc set in keep case	2014 (Note: Reissue of out-of-print box set by new distributor Lionsgate)	10 hours	ASIN B00029NKS8

=== International ===
Fritz (Colin Fox) serves a rum and Coke to Priscilla Eads (Shauna Black) in a scene from "Prisoner's Base" seen only in the international version of the show

As DVD Talk's 2006 review of Nero Wolfe reported, "longer versions aired overseas (several were literally twice as long)." Nero Wolfe saw its first international DVD release in August 2008, when "Nero Wolfe – Collection One" was offered for sale in Australia by FremantleMedia Enterprises. Distributed by Magna Pacific, "Nero Wolfe — Collection Two" (December 2008) was the first release of an episode containing scenes not available on the A&E Home Video release. The Pearson Television International version presents "Prisoner's Base" as a 90-minute film with a single set of titles and credits, and it includes three scenes (3.5 minutes) found on pp. 3–5, 21 and 27–28 of the script written by Lee Goldberg and William Rabkin.

The show began to be released on Region 2 DVD in December 2009, marketed in the Netherlands by Just Entertainment. Like the collections that were sold in Australia, these DVD sets presented the episodes in 4:3 pan and scan rather than their 16:9 aspect ratio for widescreen viewing. The third collection released in April 2010 made the 90-minute features "Wolfe Goes Out" and "Wolfe Stays In" available on home video for the first time; until then, the linked episodes "Door to Death"/ "Christmas Party" and "Eeny Meeny Murder Moe"/"Disguise for Murder" were available only in the abbreviated form sold by A&E Home Video.

In October 2012 a region-free limited-edition box set of the complete series in 4:3 format was released by independent Australian DVD distributor Shock Entertainment, which also made the series available through Australian iTunes. It is a clone of A&E Home Video's "Complete Classic Whodunit Series", with the shorter North American versions of the episodes, the first-season films split into two parts as broadcast by A&E, and A&E's brief "making of" documentary. On December 18, 2020, another set in region-free/NTSC format for American and Australian DVD players was issued as "Rex Stout's Nero Wolfe:The Complete Series" by Australia's Via Vision Entertainment.

Title	Media type	Release date	Approximate length	Numeric Identifier
Nero Wolfe — Collection One	Region 4 DVD (PAL); Three-disc set	August 13, 2008	276 minutes	UPC 9316797427038
Nero Wolfe — Collection Two	Region 4 DVD (PAL); Two-disc set (Note: Features include "Prisoner's Base" (presented as a 90-minute film with a single set of titles and credits), "Eeny Meeny Murder Moe" and "Disguise for Murder." Screen format is 4:3 full frame. Rated PG (mild violence) by the Commonwealth of Australia)	December 5, 2008	178 minutes	UPC 9315842036140
A Nero Wolfe Mystery — Serie 1	Region 2 DVD (PAL); Three-disc set	December 11, 2009	270 minutes	EAN 8717344739221
A Nero Wolfe Mystery — Serie 2	Region 2 DVD (PAL); Two-disc set	February 11, 2010	180 minutes	EAN 8717344739801
A Nero Wolfe Mystery — Serie 3	Region 2 DVD (PAL); Two-disc set	April 13, 2010	180 minutes	EAN 8717344739481
Nero Wolfe — The Complete Series	Region 0 DVD (NTSC); Eight-disc box set	October 3, 2012	1,496 minutes	5 021456 188062
Nero Wolfe: The Complete Series	Region 0 DVD (NTSC); Eight-disc box set	December 18, 2020	1,496 minutes	UPC 9337369024097
