= The Golden Spiders: A Nero Wolfe Mystery =

- Print advertisement
- Genre: Period drama
- Based on: The Golden Spiders by Rex Stout
- Written by: Paul Monash
- Directed by: Bill Duke
- Starring: Timothy Hutton; Maury Chaykin; Bill Smitrovich; Mimi Kuzyk; Colin Fox; Saul Rubinek; Fulvio Cecere; Trent McMullen; R. D. Reid
- Music by: Michael Small
- Country of origin: United States
- Original language: English

Production
- Executive producers: Michael Jaffe; Howard Braunstein; Delia Fine
- Producer: Susan Murdoch
- Production location: Toronto
- Cinematography: Michael Fash
- Editor: Ronald Sanders
- Running time: 100 minutes
- Production companies: A&E Networks; Jaffe/Braunstein Films

Original release
- Network: A&E
- Release: March 5, 2000

Related
- A Nero Wolfe Mystery

The Golden Spiders: A Nero Wolfe Mystery is a 2000 American crime drama television film based on the 1953 novel by Rex Stout. Set in 1950s Manhattan, it stars Maury Chaykin as the heavyweight detective genius Nero Wolfe, and Timothy Hutton as Wolfe's assistant, Archie Goodwin, narrator of the Nero Wolfe stories. Veteran screenwriter Paul Monash adapted the novel, and Bill Duke directed. When it first aired on A&E on March 5, 2000, The Golden Spiders was seen in 3.2 million homes, making it the fourth-most-watched A&E original movie ever. Its success led to the A&E original series Nero Wolfe (2001–2002).

== Plot ==
After Wolfe reacts petulantly to a change made in one of his favorite meals, his assistant Archie Goodwin decides to prank him by allowing a boy from the neighborhood, Pete Drossos, into the house to consult with Wolfe on what Pete believes is a case. Pete claims that a woman wearing distinctive golden spider-shaped earrings asked him to get a police officer while he was cleaning the windshield of the car she was driving at a stoplight, and he believes that her male passenger was holding her hostage.

The next night, the pair are shocked when NYPD Sgt. Purley Stebbins informs them that Pete has been killed by a hit-and-run driver, as well as INS agent Matthew Birch. Soon after, Pete's mother brings Wolfe $4.30 that Pete has saved and asks him to find Pete's killer.

Angered by Wolfe's reluctance to get involved, Archie uses the money to place an advert in the newspapers asking for the woman driving the car to contact Wolfe. Wealthy widow Laura Fromm arrives at Wolfe's office wearing the golden spider earrings and asking to hire his services. Wolfe suspects that Fromm knows who the driver is, but she refuses to reveal it; the next day, Fromm is also murdered in an apparent hit-and-run. Angered that two people who came to him for help are now dead, Wolfe decides to solve the murders.

Wolfe identifies a charitable organization that Mrs Fromm supported as a likely link between the deaths. Archie begins to investigate various individuals connected to the charity: Fromm's secretary, Jean Estey, director Angela White, public relations manager Paul Kuffner, and the wife of the charity's attorney, Dennis Horan. It is revealed that the charity is part of a blackmail ring targeting desperate refugees who are in America illegally. Horan attempts to distance himself from the other men, but when they learn this, the others identify him as a key ringleader of the blackmail scheme, along with Matthew Birch. Birch, however, took orders from an unknown woman.

Gathering the principal suspects in his office, Wolfe reveals the identity of the murderer — Jean Estey. Estey was a key figure with the blackmail ring, but Fromm had overheard the code words she used with her confederates — "said the spider to the fly" — and had begun to suspect her, giving her the earrings to try and provoke a response.

It is implied that Birch captured Estey to 'handle her' because she was taking too large of a share of the profits, prompting her to panic and try to contact Pete for help. After killing Birch, Estey realized that Pete could identify her and so killed him, too. Her third homicide was of Mrs. Fromm after the dinner at Horan's, feeling pressured after she had cut a $10,000 check to Nero Wolfe to investigate.

Estey is identified by the tailor who sold her the men's clothing she used as a disguise and is arrested. The case ends with Archie giving half the fee Wolfe has earned to Pete's mother.

== Production ==
In a 2002 interview in Scarlet Street magazine, executive producer Michael Jaffe explained why the novel The Golden Spiders was selected to introduce contemporary audiences to Nero Wolfe:

There are three or four really extraordinary novels — The Silent Speaker, In the Best Families, and The Doorbell Rang, for example. These are some of the most famous and most complex and most amazing stories in the series, but we didn't want to start with those particular ones for a whole complex of reasons. We wanted to pick a story that had activity in it so that we could slowly bring people into the static milieu of Nero Wolfe's house. The Golden Spiders took you outside. There's a gunfight and a tough interrogation scene. It was a very strong story with a lot of pathos, because a young boy is murdered and Wolfe has to deal with his mother. So that was why we chose that one.

Saul Rubinek, who would take the role of Lon Cohen in the subsequent series, was cast as Saul Panzer in the pilot. Prior to the original film's broadcast, Rubinek was asked what made him want to do the project:

Maury Chaykin and I have known each other for almost 30 years and so we know what each other's doing, and I've also been an aficionado of Rex Stout's. ... By total coincidence, I started doing book tapes. I must have done seven or eight book tapes reading Rex Stout novels. I've always known Maury would be great casting as Nero Wolfe... And as it turned out, there's a character called Saul Panzer, who is one of Wolfe's operatives. ... At one point, Saul has to go undercover and play an immigrant. ...

Rex Stout was a great humanitarian, and he did a tremendous amount of charity work, and he was very compassionate towards immigrants to the United States. It's not out of keeping with Stout's personality that he would have written about victimization of immigrants who are being blackmailed. The center of the story is about that. And don't forget that he's writing in the fifties, when there was a lot of reaction against immigrants after the Second World War coming into America, and it wasn't pleasant. I would imagine it's not so different from the eighties when the Vietnamese were coming into America, and there was a lot of reaction against that. There's always a period during American history where the American public might react against who we're letting into the country, and I think he had a great deal of compassion for that, for people who are stateless. I was born in a refugee camp myself, and my family are Holocaust survivors, and I was naturalized as a Canadian citizen before I became an American citizen, so it's a part of the story that I kind of connected to.

The Golden Spiders is an A&E Networks production in association with Jaffe/Braunstein Films. Shot in Toronto, the film features production design by Lindsey Hermer-Bell and cinematography by Michael Fash. The adaptation of Rex Stout's novel is the final credit of Paul Monash, a veteran screenwriter and film producer. "I have no need to work on things I don't care to," Monash told an interviewer about his work on The Golden Spiders. "This, I wanted to do."

== Cast ==
- Maury Chaykin as Nero Wolfe, private investigator
- Timothy Hutton as Archie Goodwin, Nero Wolfe's assistant and narrator of the story
- Bill Smitrovich as Inspector Cramer of Manhattan Homicide West
- Mimi Kuzyk as Laura Fromm, socialite and philanthropist
- Colin Fox as Fritz Brenner, Nero Wolfe's chef and major domo
- Saul Rubinek as Saul Panzer, freelance detective working for Nero Wolfe
- Larissa Laskin as Jean Estey, Mrs. Fromm's secretary
- Gary Reineke as Dennis Horan, attorney representing the Association of European Refugees
- Beau Starr as Lips Egan, organized crime figure
- Elizabeth Brown as Claire Horan, wife of Dennis Horan
- Fulvio Cecere as Fred Durkin, freelance detective working for Nero Wolfe
- Nancy Beatty as Mrs. Anthea Drossos, Pete Drossos' mother
- R. D. Reid as Sergeant Purley Stebbins of Manhattan Homicide West
- Philip Craig as James Maddox, Mrs. Fromm's attorney and executor of her estate
- Gerry Quigley as Lon Cohen, journalist
- Rothaford Gray as Peckham, Mrs. Fromm's butler
- Robert Clark as Pete Drossos, a 12-year-old boy who lives in Wolfe's neighborhood
- Norma Clarke as the receptionist at the Association for European Refugees
- Nicky Guadagni as Angela Wright, executive secretary of the Association of European Refugees
- Hrant Alianak as Mr. Gerstner, proprietor of Gerstner Jewelers
- Brian Miranda as Irving Gerstner, a 12-year-old boy
- Trent McMullen as Orrie Cather, freelance detective working for Nero Wolfe
- Peter Mensah as Mort Erwin, a thug
- James Purcell as Walter Neary, deputy police commissioner
- Jack Newman as Bernard Levine, clothing store owner
- Dwayne McLean as Matthew Birch, special agent of the Immigration and Naturalization Service
- Robert Bockstael as Paul Kuffner, Mrs. Fromm's publicist

== Reception ==
A&E initially planned that The Golden Spiders would be the first in a series of two-hour mystery movies featuring Nero Wolfe. The high ratings (3.2 million households) garnered by the film, along with the critical praise accorded Chaykin as Wolfe and Hutton as Archie, prompted A&E to order a weekly one-hour drama series — Nero Wolfe — into production.

=== Reviews and commentary ===
- Don Dale, Style Weekly (February 28, 2000) — If you’ve never read any of Rex Stout’s Nero Wolfe mysteries, here’s your chance to meet one of the most unusual and finely drawn characters in detective fiction. If you have read any of the 70 or so books that Stout wrote between the mid-30s and 1975, when he died — and if you treasured each and every one, as most Stout/Wolfe fans do — here’s your chance to see your favorites come alive.
- Jerry Krupnick, The Star-Ledger (February 28, 2000) — The Golden Spiders is a delightful mix of tangled webs and intriguing complications. ... All this comes complete with a nifty '50s setting, great cars and clothes and characters.
- David Cuthbert, The Times-Picayune (March 1, 2000) — The language is pure Wolfe and its delivery, by the superb actor Maury Chaykin, is smooth and measured, with just the requisite bite. ... Smart, witty and eminently watchable.
- Steven Oxman, Variety (March 1, 2000) — Superb acting, stylish design and perfect pacing from director Bill Duke more than compensate for the convoluted storyline. Timothy Hutton, Maury Chaykin and a stellar ensemble deliver one juicy moment after another. ... The real pleasure here is not the plot, but the playing. Chaykin is wonderfully petulant as Wolfe, and Hutton shows a surprising comedic charm that reveals an as-yet-undiscovered range. Even better, the performances are more than the sum of their parts: The testy chemistry between the two leads multiplies the amusement.
- Danny Heitman, The Advocate (March 2, 2000) — Because so much of the story unfolds through Socratic exchanges between Wolfe and Archie, The Golden Spiders is long on talk and short on action. It's even wordier than it needs to be, thanks to some self-conscious narration by Hutton which tells us things that the camera should show us instead. ... The production values match A&E's typically high standards, with period detail that persuasively evokes Eisenhower-era New York.
- Robert P. Laurence, Copley News Service (March 2, 2000) — Timothy Hutton is Archie, wearing the gumshoe's smart-aleck smirk and swagger as comfortably as an old shirt. ... Canada's Maury Chaykin, generously portly as he is, nevertheless is physically a bit light for the role of the massive Wolfe. But he captures the detective's idiosyncrasies, his arrogance, his smug pomposity, even his utter self-absorption. Most important, he invests Wolfe with a depth of passion and an intensity of emotion that are not always obvious in Stout's novels. He is possibly the most convincing Wolfe ever.
- Robert Bianco, USA Today (March 3, 2000) — Though the books are enormously popular, they've resisted successful dramatization — for reasons made clear by A&E's The Golden Spiders: A Nero Wolfe Mystery ... Whatever problems Spiders may have inherited from Stout's book are compounded by the script and direction, which give the movie all the forward propulsion of a glacier.
- Martin Renzhofer, The Salt Lake Tribune (March 3, 2000) — Timothy Hutton and Maury Chaykin star in this charming tale of suspense ... The heart of the movie comes from the chemistry between Chaykin and Hutton.
- Jonathan Storm, The Philadelphia Inquirer (March 3, 2000) — The case itself has a hole or two, the resolution is somewhat abrupt, but the characters, the charm, the very aura, are as sumptuous as the artistic cuisine prepared by Wolfe's chef, Fritz, that has helped balloon the detective to one-seventh of a ton. ... A&E has no firm plans, but a spokesman says the network hopes to make more Nero Wolfe mysteries. It had better.
- Howard Lachtman, The Record (March 4, 2000) — As portrayed by Maury Chaykin and Timothy Hutton, Nero and Archie come to life so vividly they overshadow the rather slender mystery about a refugee scam. Hutton, whose late dad, Jim, starred as sleuth Ellery Queen in a 1975-76 TV series, is bright and breezy as the foil to Chaykin, whose imperious big guy is a hugely more credible figure than William Conrad's 1981 TV version.
- Rob Lowman, The Daily News of Los Angeles (March 4, 2000) — A&E has finally found a detective to compete with Hercule Poirot of the BBC. ... While Spiders is a well-plotted tale with an Agatha Christie-style ending, the joy is in the eccentricities of the characters. Chaykin and Hutton make a wonderful team. Chaykin blusters over silly things, but only betrays the slightest emotion when he is obviously touched. Hutton shows a light comedic flair that he hasn't been able to use much in his career.
- James D. Watts, Tulsa World (March 4, 2000) — It's the best thing the network has done in the mystery field in years, one of those rare movies that does superb justice to its source. ... The film captures the feel of the book — Archie's breezy narration, the lushness of Wolfe's surroundings, the overly romanticized view of New York City. And the cast, under Bill Duke's direction, is impeccable.
- Jim Bawden, Toronto Star (March 5, 2000) — The setting for The Golden Spiders is New York, 1953, and the period details, from the women's bright lipstick to the vintage automobiles, are just right but never obtrusive.
- David L. Beck, San Jose Mercury News, (March 5, 2000) — The differences between Sherlock Holmes and Nero Wolfe go deeper than thin vs. fat, cocaine vs. beer, London vs. New York, beekeeping vs. orchids. Much deeper. Wolfe is the one who has never had a decent movie made about him. Until now. A&E's The Golden Spiders gets it right: tone texture, visuals and all. And it does it in the same way Jeremy Brett's Holmes series did: by respecting the originals.
- Alan Kellogg, Edmonton Journal (March 5, 2000) — The first Nero Wolfe film worthy of the moniker. It's a historic moment of sorts, a treat for fans as well as a suitable entree for the uninitiated. If there's any justice, this will mark the beginning of a long series of Wolfe mysteries. The right hands have finally been found.
- Bruce McCabe, The Boston Globe (March 5, 2000) — Spiders is a golden opportunity to meet Wolfe, played impeccably by Maury Chaykin, Goodwin, played drolly by Timothy Hutton, and a marvelous ensemble of suspects and police operatives criss-crossing back in 1950s Manhattan. The tersely witty, briskly paced telefilm surprises and delights right up to the obligatory climax in which the whole gang gathers in Wolfe's living room for some dramatic finger-pointing.
- Jean Prescott, The Sun Herald (March 5, 2000) — The narration conveys to viewer as well as reader a larger-than-life quality. And with respect and apparent affection, screenwriter Paul Monash has animated the population of this particular Stout story and done it with realism, not caricature.
- Marilyn Stasio, The New York Times (March 5, 2000) — For all the thought and research that Chaykin has put into his portrayal of the brilliant and maddening Nero Wolfe, the actor feels that he has "just scratched the surface" of his enigmatic character. ... If A&E decides to expand this original movie into a series, maybe he'll even get a chance to wear yellow silk pajamas, a sight we're all longing to see.
- Gene Amole, Rocky Mountain News (March 7, 2000) — Sunday night's Golden Spiders TV drama refreshed all my Nero Wolfe memories. It was outstanding. Maury Chaykin was the perfect Wolfe. Timothy Hutton was an excellent, wise-cracking Archie Goodwin. Director Bill Duke had each detail of the set precisely accurate. Now that A&E has produced a perfect Wolfe mystery with 1930s ambience, it would be a rotten, lowdown, dirty shame if the network didn't produce other Wolfe mysteries with the same cast and director.
- John Leonard, CBS Sunday Morning (March 12, 2000) — The Golden Spiders, lovingly adapted by Paul Monash and lovingly directed by Bill Duke, is perfect pitch, from the casting to the period detail of New York in the late '30s.
- William Rabkin, screenwriter for A Nero Wolfe Mystery — I'd seen Tim Hutton playing mostly sensitive parts, and he was very good at it. But even though you tell yourself you're too smart to typecast people, that's exactly what I did with him. Then I saw Golden Spiders, and here he was doing something very different. As Archie, he had this Dick Powell-playing-Philip Marlowe quality, a '40s leading man quality — sassy and fresh, kind of obnoxious but always in a likable way.
- Brian Courtis, The Age (November 1, 2002) — Paul Monash's pleasing adaptation of Rex Stout's New York classic detective stories of the 1930s and 1940s wins us with its detail and a couple of terrific performances. ... It's gourmet fare. Don't miss it.

== Home video releases ==
=== A&E Home Video ===
The Golden Spiders, the feature-length pilot for the series A Nero Wolfe Mystery, is included on two of A&E's DVD box sets —Nero Wolfe: The Complete Classic Whodunit Series and Nero Wolfe: The Complete Second Season. The film was also released independently on VHS and DVD.

Title	Media type	Release date	Approximate length	ISBN
Nero Wolfe: The Complete Classic; Whodunit Series	Region 1 DVD; Eight-disc box set	April 25, 2006	24 hours, 56 minutes + extras	ISBN 0-7670-8893-X
The Golden Spiders: A Nero Wolfe Mystery	Region 1 DVD+R (A&E Store exclusive)	October 2004	94 minutes	ISBN 0-7670-6719-3
Nero Wolfe: The Complete Second Season	Region 1 DVD; Five-disc box set	June 28, 2005	13 hours, 20 minutes	ISBN 0-7670-5508-X
The Golden Spiders: A Nero Wolfe Mystery	VHS videotape (NTSC)	May 30, 2000	100 minutes	ISBN 0-7670-2551-2

=== FremantleMedia Enterprises ===
The Golden Spiders was distributed by Pearson Television International. The film saw its first international DVD release in August 2008, when it was included in "Nero Wolfe – Collection One", offered for sale in Australia by FremantleMedia Enterprises.

Title	Media type	Release date	Approximate length	Numeric Identifier
Nero Wolfe — Collection One	Region 4 DVD; Three-disc set	August 13, 2008	276 minutes	UPC 9316797427038
A Nero Wolfe Mystery — Serie 1	Region 2 DVD; Three-disc set	December 11, 2009	270 minutes	EAN 9315842036140
