= Gary Reineke =

American-Canadian actor (1940–2024)

- Born: May 20, 1940; Thorp, Wisconsin, U.S.
- Died: September 23, 2024 (aged 84); Toronto, Ontario, Canada
- Occupation: Actor
- Years active: 1968–2012

Gary Allen Reineke (May 20, 1940 – September 23, 2024) was an American actor based in Canada.

== Life and career ==
Reineke was born in Thorp, Wisconsin, on May 20, 1940, and graduated from the University of Wisconsin–Eau Claire.

Reineke appeared in more than 80 films from 1974, and was a Genie Award nominee for Best Supporting Actor at the 4th Genie Awards in 1983 for his performance in The Grey Fox.

Reineke died at Mount Sinai Hospital in Toronto, on September 23, 2024, at the age of 84.

== Selected filmography ==
Film
Year	Title	Role	Notes
1974	Sunday in the Country		
1976	The Clown Murders		
1977	Why Shoot the Teacher?		
1979	Riel		
1980	Agency		
1980	The Kidnapping of the President	Dietrich	
1981	A Choice of Two		
1982	The Grey Fox		
1982	Murder by Phone		
1988	Iron Eagle II		
1989	George's Island		
1989	The Top of His Head		
1995	Hiroshima		
1998	The Taking of Pelham One Two Three		
1999	Summer's End		
2005	Black Widow		
2008	WarGames: The Dead Code		

Television
Year	Title	Role	Notes
1978	A Matter of Choice	David	
1979	The Albertans		
1988	The King Chronicle	Oscar D. Skelton	
1992	To Catch a Killer	Petrie	
1993	Dieppe		
2000	The Golden Spiders: A Nero Wolfe Mystery	Dennis Horan	
2001–2002	Nero Wolfe	Oliver Pitkin; Mr. Leacraft; Hombert	"Prisoner's Base" "Poison à la Carte "The Silent Speaker"
2002	The Scream Team		
2009	The Line	Max's doctor	2 episodes
