= Christine Brubaker =

Canadian actor and director

Christine Brubaker is a Canadian actor and director. As a theatre actor, she has worked across Canada and is well known for her work in the ensemble cast of the A&E TV original series, A Nero Wolfe Mystery (2001–2002). As a theatre director, she has directed dozens of world premieres including Wilde Tales and a new adaptation of The Horse and His Boy for the Shaw Festival. She is the co-creator of 7th Cousins: An Automythography, and the writer-director of the large scale outdoor performance Henry G20. She teaches directing in the graduate program at University of Calgary's School of Creative and Performing Arts in Calgary, Alberta and splits her time between Calgary and Toronto, Ontario.
