= Fulvio Cecere =

Canadian actor and filmmaker

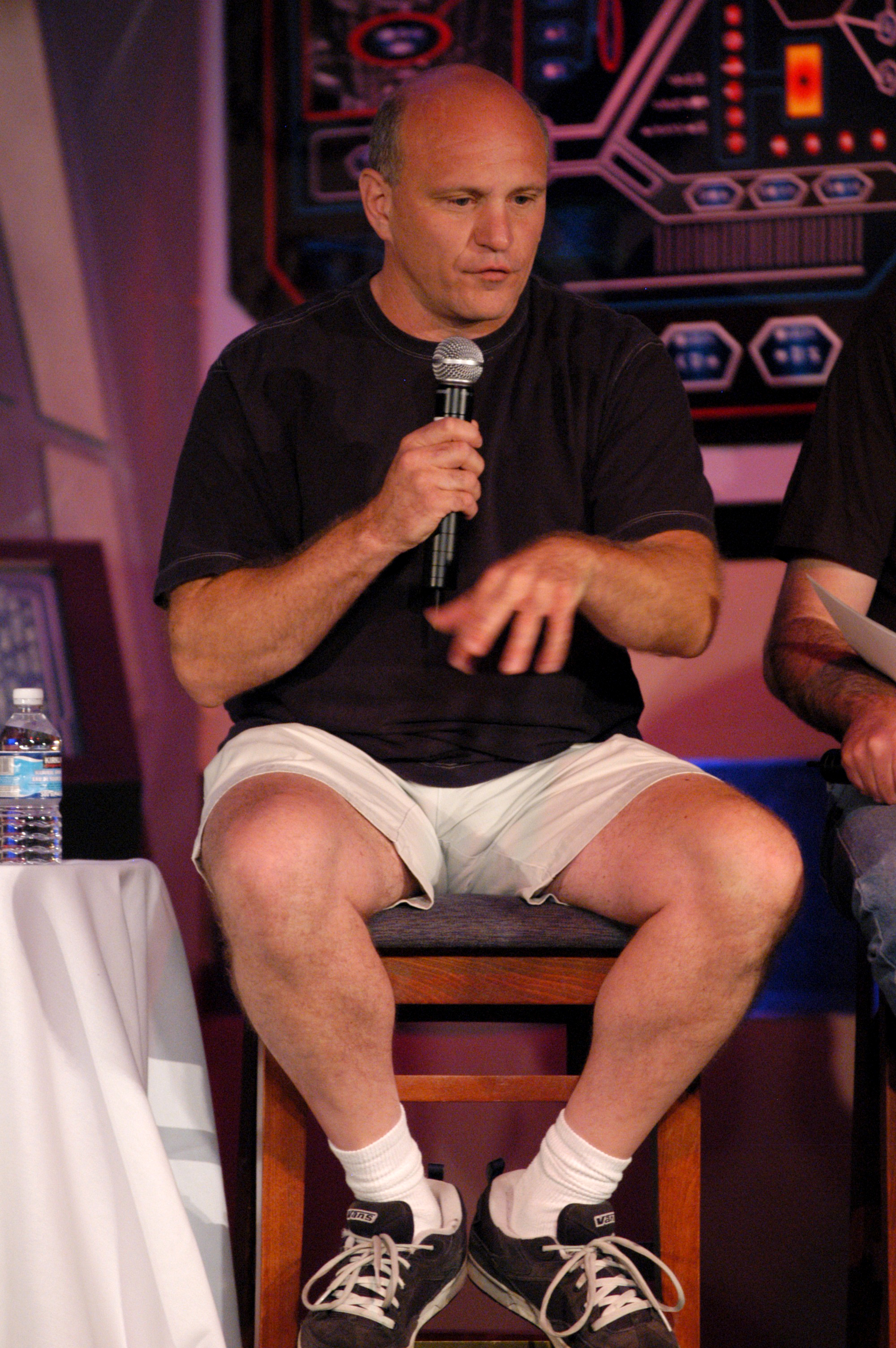
- Fulvio Cecere, 2005
- Born: March 11, 1960 (age 65); Canada
- Years active: 1993–present

Fulvio Cecere (born March 11, 1960) is a Canadian actor and filmmaker.

== Early life ==
Born in Canada, he moved to Hawthorne, New Jersey, as a teenager and attended Hawthorne High School, graduating as part of the class of 1978. Cecere attended Southwestern Law School in Los Angeles, but after one year he realized that acting, not law, was his true calling. He took acting classes at UCLA and starred in a wide array of television and feature film parts over the next few years.

== Career ==
He played the part of freelance detective Fred Durkin in the A&E Network's original film The Golden Spiders: A Nero Wolfe Mystery (2000) and the series A Nero Wolfe Mystery (2001–2002). He also starred as Det. Leon Vaughn in the 2001 slasher film Valentine. He also portrayed Lt. Thorne in Battlestar Galactica, Agent Sandoval in Dark Angel (2000–2002), and had recurring roles in TV series, including Tarzan, Tilt, Blade and Intelligence. His work in feature films includes roles in Paycheck, Assault on Precinct 13, Cinderella Man, The Tortured and Watchmen.

Cecere's 2018 documentary film 350 Days includes interviews with 70 current and former professional wrestlers. The film, whose title references the number of days many wrestlers spend working each year, took five years to complete and resulted from an interest in wrestling that arose out of Cecere's work on Cinderella Man.

== Filmography ==
- 1995 Dangerous Intentions as Officer Tuggles
- 1995 Assassins as Cop #5
- 1996 Unforgettable as Partner (uncredited)
- 1997 Excess Baggage as Sharp Shooter
- 1998 Dirty as Larry
- 1998 Disturbing Behavior as Anesthesiologist (uncredited)
- 1998 Letters from a Killer as Angry Man
- 1998 American Dragons as Bobby Spano
- 1998 Delivered as Detective #1
- 1998 The Bone Collector as Forensics Expert
- 1999 The Hurricane as Paterson Policeman
- 1999 Double Jeopardy as BMW Salesman
- 2000 Mercy as Detective Leeland
- 2000 Best in Show as Airport Passerby
- 2001 Valentine as Detective Leon Vaughn
- 2001 See Spot Run as Lawyer
- 2001 Replicant as Agent #1
- 2002 Liberty Stands Still as Officer Burt McGovern
- 2003 The Invitation as Correlli (scenes deleted)
- 2003 Paycheck as Agent Fuman
- 2004 The Perfect Score as Francesca's Father
- 2005 Assault on Precinct 13 as Officer Ray Portnell
- 2005 Cinderella Man as Referee McAvoy
- 2005 Chaos as Detective Thomas Branch
- 2006 John Tucker Must Die as Chemistry Teacher
- 2006 Deck the Halls as Town Passerby
- 2007 No Reservations as Bob, Fish Vendor
- 2008 Girlfriend Experience as Police Officer
- 2009 Watchmen as Agent Forbes
- 2009 Case 39 as Fire Marshall
- 2010 The Tortured as Detective Berger
- 2010 Resident Evil: Afterlife as Wendell
- 2011 Matty Hanson and the Invisibility Ray as FBI Agent
- 2011 High Chicago as 'Popeye'
- 2014 Step Up: All In as Uncle (Pizza Place)
- 2015 The Age of Adaline as Cab Driver
- 2015 The Unspoken as Sheriff
