= Scarlet Street (magazine) =

American film magazine

- Issue 25 cover
- Editor: Richard Valley
- Categories: Horror film, Mystery, Film Noir
- Frequency: Irregular
- Founder: Richard Valley
- Founded: 1991
- Final issue Number: 2006; 55
- Company: Scarlet Street Inc.
- Country: United States
- Website: Official site

Scarlet Street was an American film magazine that primarily specialized in the genres of horror, mystery and film noir. Its initial concentration was on Sherlock Holmes and related film and television productions, but later its subject matter expanded to include a variety of other genres.

The title was chosen to reference several of its chosen fields: mystery and film noir (from the film of the same name), and Sherlock Holmes (from A Study in Scarlet).

== History ==
Scarlet Street spawned from a limited-distribution newsletter created by community-theater actor, playwright and Sherlock Holmes devotee Richard Valley, who was inspired to publish his views on the Granada television series The Adventures of Sherlock Holmes—in particular, the home video releases of the program, which began distribution by MPI in 1990. His contact with MPI and their enthusiasm regarding Holmsian fandom led to a decision to change the format from newsletter to full-fledged fanzine (years later, Valley would be contracted by MPI to compose liner notes for their DVD collection of the Granada series, as well as for their releases of the Basil Rathbone Sherlock Holmes film series).

The 1991 premiere issue of Scarlet Street was a black-and-white photo offset publication with a print run of about 500. Like many fanzines, it contained a combination of genre essays and articles, photos and original artwork. Articles were written by Valley, his friends and fellow film fans. Issues were sold by mail order and at movie conventions, and sold out quickly. Encouraged by the response, Valley (as editor, with colleague Jessie Lilley as publisher) continued producing issues on a semi-regular basis.

With articles and interviews by respected genre authors, and increased circulation through nationwide distributors, Scarlet Street arguably transcended the fanzine appellation into magazine status, adding color covers and glossier interior content.

Scarlet Street has been criticized by some for having a "gay agenda," due to gay-friendly content and articles that have included discussion of the sexual orientation of genre filmmakers and its possible relationship to their work. Valley (in latter years holding the position of both editor and publisher) stated that, "Scarlet Street isn't a gay magazine, but it isn't a straight magazine, either. It's a magazine for all genre lovers who are mature enough and smart enough to consider a different perspective on some old favorites."

The magazine’s final issue was #55, published in June 2006. Editor Richard Valley died after a two-year battle with cancer on October 12, 2007.

In January 2008, several of the magazine's staffers announced their intention to publish a new magazine "in the tradition of Scarlet Street", entitled Scarlet: The Film Magazine. The new magazine debuted in June 2008.

== See also ==
- List of film periodicals

== Bibliography ==
- Cornett, Mike. "Richard Valley, 1949-2007 – A Remembrance". Lambda Sci-Fi Newsletter, Issue #212, November 2007
- Coutros, Evonne E. “Terror Never Dies in Scarlet Street – Publisher Revives Gothic Mystery". The Record (Bergen County, New Jersey); 11 August 1993
