= R. D. Reid =

Canadian actor

R. D. Reid (September 22, 1944 – June 20, 2017) was a Canadian character actor known for his portrayal of Sergeant Purley Stebbins in the A&E TV original series, A Nero Wolfe Mystery (2001–2002), and the series pilot, The Golden Spiders: A Nero Wolfe Mystery (2000). He appeared in Zack Snyder's Dawn of the Dead, and George A. Romero's Diary of the Dead. His other film appearances include Santa Who? (2000), Capote (2005) Half Baked (1998), Lars and the Real Girl (2007) and You Are Here (2010). He also starred in the indie horror film Silent But Deadly.

Reid died on June 20, 2017, in Canada.

== Filmography ==
Year	Title	Role	Notes
1988	Murder One	Mike	
1989	The Dream Team	Kenny	Uncredited
1990	Love & Murder	Man in the House	
1990	Beautiful Dreamers	Karl Jessop	
1992	The Cutting Edge	Calgary Cop	
1993	Searching for Bobby Fischer	Final Tournament Director	
1993	Thirty Two Short Films About Glenn Gould	Trucker #3	
1994	Replikator	Wino	
1998	Half Baked	Scientist	
1999	Prisoner of Love	Ed	
2000	The Wonderful World of Disney	Grady	Episode: "Santa Who?"
2001	The Shipping News	Alvin Yark	
2004	Dawn of the Dead	Glen	
2004	Sugar	Lyle	
2005	A History of Violence	Pat	
2005	Cinderella Man	Hooverville Cop	
2005	Capote	Roy Church	
2007	Stuck	Manager	
2007	Diary of the Dead	Farmer	
2007	Lars and the Real Girl	Reverend Bock	
2008	The Baby Formula	Dr. Oldenfield	
2010	You Are Here	The Lecturer	
2011	Silent But Deadly	Ed	
2011	Man on the Train	Barber	
2012	The Conspiracy	William Jensen	
2015	Coconut Hero	Funeral Director	
