= The Mother Hunt =

1963 novel by Rex Stout

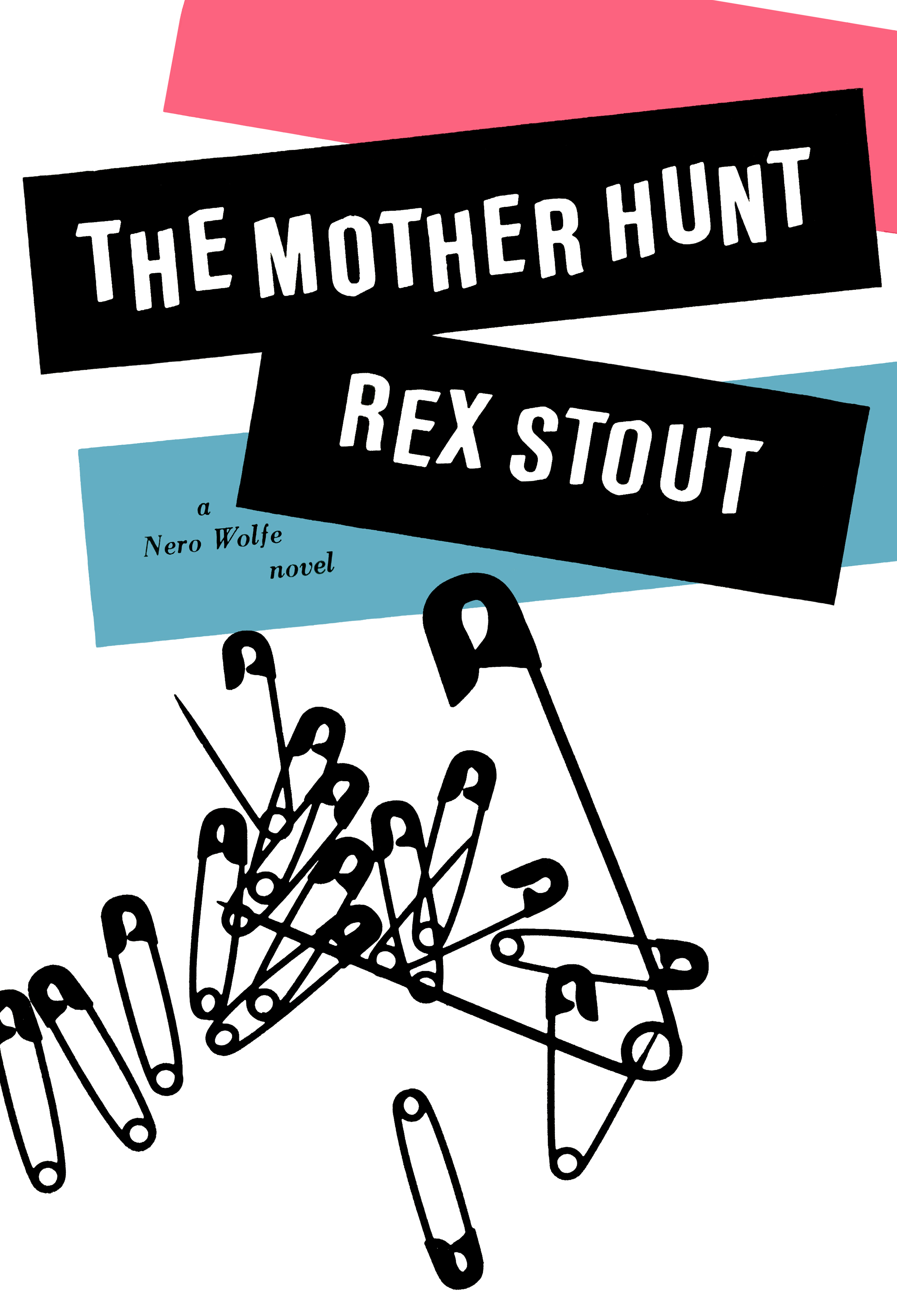
- First edition
- Author: Rex Stout
- Cover artist: Bill English
- Language: English
- Series: Nero Wolfe
- Genre: Detective fiction
- Publisher: Viking Press
- Publication date: July 18, 1963
- Publication place: United States
- Media type: Print (hardcover)
- Pages: 182 pp. (first edition)
- OCLC: 1015193
- Preceded by: Gambit
- Followed by: Trio for Blunt Instruments

The Mother Hunt is a Nero Wolfe detective novel by Rex Stout, first published by Viking Press in 1963.

== Plot introduction ==
"Do you like eggs?"
She laughed. She looked at me, so I laughed too.
Wolfe scowled. "Confound it, are eggs comical? Do you know how to scramble eggs, Mrs. Valdon?"
"Yes, of course."
"To use Mr. Goodwin's favorite locution, one will get you ten that you don't. I'll scramble eggs for your breakfast and we'll see. Tell me forty minutes before you're ready."
Her eyes widened. "Forty minutes?"
"Yes. I knew you didn't know."

— Nero Wolfe, conversing with Lucy Valdon, in The Mother Hunt, chapter 17

A baby is left in a young widow's vestibule, along with a note implying that her late husband is the baby's father. The widow hires Nero Wolfe to identify and locate the baby's birth mother.

Throughout the Wolfe oeuvre, Archie's main romantic interest is Lily Rowan, a Manhattan socialite and heiress who, after an incident in a bull pasture, nicknames Archie "Escamillo." But Stout portrays their relationship as two close friends who share an intimacy of long standing, rather than one of exclusivity. Stout makes it clear that Archie has other romances. One with Phoebe Gunther, in The Silent Speaker, has an exceptionally powerful spark. In The Mother Hunt, Stout for the first time makes unambiguous an affair between Archie and another major character.

In a rare physical outburst, Wolfe becomes so angry and frustrated at one point that he throws his suit jacket at Archie. (Note: The Mother Hunt, chapter 14)

== Plot summary ==
Lucy Valdon has recently been widowed by the accidental death of her husband, the novelist Richard Valdon. Lucy has a surprise waiting for her in her vestibule one evening: an abandoned baby, dressed, with a note pinned to a blanket. The note claims that the baby is Richard's son. Lucy wants to learn who the mother is. That information would help determine whether her husband and the mother had been intimate, and therefore the likelihood that the child is in fact Richard's.

Wolfe is reluctant as always, but agrees to investigate. Archie examines the clothes that the baby was wearing and spots an unusual item: the baby's overalls have horsehair buttons, apparently handmade. After Archie draws a blank trying to track the buttons down via businesses in the garment trade, Wolfe tries a tactic that he uses to good effect in other cases. He advertises for information.

The advertisement succeeds in prompting a call from someone who has seen a similar button, and when Archie follows up he eventually locates Ellen Tenzer in Mahopac, about fifty miles north of New York City. Miss Tenzer is a retired nurse who from time to time cares for babies temporarily. She is unwilling to help Archie, though, and orders him off her property. Archie complies, Miss Tenzer disappears, and the next day she is found, strangled, in her car on a Manhattan street.

With that line of investigation closed to them, Wolfe and Archie try another. Lucy arranges for several of Richard's acquaintances to come to the brownstone. Wolfe asks that they each supply him with a list of all the women with whom Richard was in contact during a three-month period roughly corresponding to the date of the baby's conception. A list of 148 names results, and it takes nearly four weeks for Archie, Saul, Fred and Orrie to verify that none of the women had an unaccounted for baby following the period in question.

Finally, Wolfe decides to go for the swindle. His plan involves the Gazette, Lon Cohen's employer, and it succeeds in flushing the baby's mother from hiding. But then she is found dead, also strangled.

When Inspector Cramer learns that there is a connection between the dead woman and Wolfe, he shows up at the front stoop, forcing Wolfe and Archie to flee via the back door. Wolfe is furious about the murders, particularly the second, and desperately wants to expose the killer himself. But if Cramer finds him, he will either have to tell Cramer about the search for the baby's mother or withhold evidence in a capital case.

To avoid having to make that choice, Wolfe and Archie hole up in Lucy's house—she, her baby and her staff are away for a few days. While there, Wolfe has an insight about how the murderer and Ellen Tenzer might have become acquainted. That insight leads to the traditional Wolfe finale, with witnesses and suspects gathered together, but this time it's in someone else's house.

== The unfamiliar word ==
Examples of unfamiliar words—or unfamiliar uses of words that some would otherwise consider familiar—are found throughout the corpus, often in the give-and-take between Wolfe and Archie. The Mother Hunt contains just this one (the page reference is to the Bantam edition):

- Pucker. Page 105, chapter 10. Not merely unfamiliar but archaic, according to the Random House Dictionary of the English Language.

Also, in this story, Archie must find the source of the peculiar buttons on the baby's clothes, which leads him to the garment district and a man who is a button collector, who asks him if he is a "button man." This expression would probably only be familiar to readers who read noir detective stories or to actual gangsters. This is played up in the A&E version by repeating the phrase a few times.

== Cast of characters ==
- Nero Wolfe – the private investigator
- Archie Goodwin – Wolfe's assistant (and the narrator of all Wolfe stories)
- Lucy Valdon – Wolfe's client, the young widow of the novelist Richard Valdon and guardian of an infant left at her door
- Ellen Tenzer – a retired nurse who takes care of babies from time to time, whose hobby is making buttons from horsehair
- Anne Tenzer – Ellen's niece, a high-level office temp who fills in for vacationing executive secretaries
- Leo Bingham, Julian Haft, Willis Krug, Carol Mardus and Manuel Upton – friends and associates of the late Richard Valdon
- Nicholas Losseff – "The only button fiend in America" (Note: The Mother Hunt, chapter 3)
- Sally Corbett – an operative who works for Dol Bonner (Note: In chapter 12 of The Mother Hunt, Archie writes, "Dol and Sally had been responsible, six years back, for my revision of my basic attitude toward female ops ..." The novella "Too Many Detectives", published in 1957 in Three for the Chair, features Dol Bonner and Sally Colt. In chapter 7 of that story, Archie writes of a dinner date with Sally: "I had decided that I would have to concede an exception to my verdict on she-dicks ..." It is clear that the same Sally figures in both stories, and that the change of surname from Colt to Corbett may be due to a marriage that Archie prefers not to mention, or may be a continuity error.)
- Inspector Cramer – representing Manhattan Homicide

== Reviews and commentary ==
- Jacques Barzun and Wendell Hertig Taylor, A Catalogue of Crime: "Nero and Archie make one of their flights from home, and the grand confrontation scene is staged at their refuge. Nero is competent but not remarkably so in finding out who did the two murders and the giving birth."

== Adaptations ==
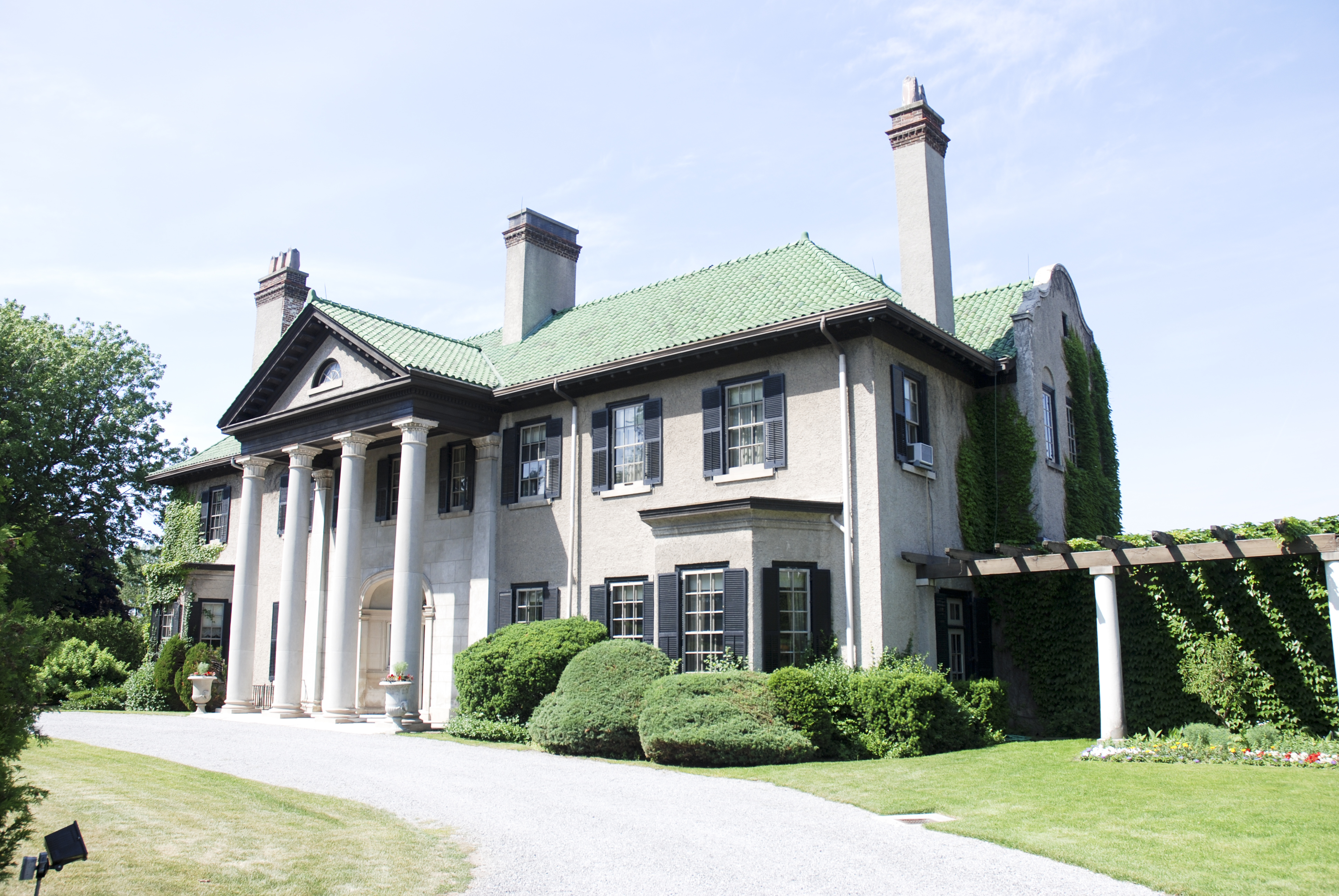
Parkwood Estate, Lucy Valdon's home in "Motherhunt" (A Nero Wolfe Mystery)

=== Nero Wolfe (A&E Network) ===
The Mother Hunt was adapted for the second season of the A&E TV series A Nero Wolfe Mystery (2001–2002). Written by Sharon Elizabeth Doyle, "Motherhunt" made its debut in two one-hour episodes airing May 12 and 19, 2002, on A&E. The direction is credited to Alan Smithee.

Timothy Hutton is Archie Goodwin; Maury Chaykin is Nero Wolfe. Other members of the cast (in credits order) include Colin Fox (Fritz Brenner), Bill Smitrovich (Inspector Cramer), Conrad Dunn (Saul Panzer), Trent McMullen (Orrie Cather), Fulvio Cecere (Fred Durkin), Penelope Ann Miller (Lucy Valdon), Richard Waugh (Manuel Upton), Boyd Banks (Willis Krug), R. D. Reid (Sergeant Purley Stebbins), Saul Rubinek (Lon Cohen), Steve Cumyn (Julian Haft), Shannon Jobe (Miss Mimm), Griffin Dunne (Nicolas Lossoff), Brooke Burns (Beatrice Epps), Erinn Bartlett (Anne Tenzer), Carrie Fisher (Ellen Tenzer), James Tolkan (Leo Bingham) Manon von Gerkan (Sally Corbett) and Kathryn Zenna (Carol Mardus).

In addition to original music by Nero Wolfe composer Michael Small, the soundtrack includes music by Frédéric Chopin (titles), (Note: Frédéric Chopin, arranged by Jonathan C. Starkey, "Minute Waltz". KPM Music, KPM 23, Piano Masterclass (track 19).) (Note: Frédéric Chopin, arranged by Jonathan C. Starkey, Nocturne in E flat Major, Op. 9, No. 2. KPM Music, KPM 23, Piano Masterclass (track 16).) Johann Sebastian Bach, (Note: Johann Sebastian Bach, Suite for Solo Cello No. 1, BWV 1007. KPM Music, KPMCS 19, Tranquility (track 9).) Henry Davies, (Note: Henry Davies, "All Day Long I Dream (of Caroline)". Carlin Production Music, CAR 148, The History of Jazz (track 11).) Antonín Dvořák, (Note: Antonín Dvořák, Humoresque in G Flat, Op. 101, No. 7. KPM Music, KPM CS 7, Light Classics Volume One (track 7).) Scooter Pietsch and Sidney James, (Note: Scooter Pietsch and Sidney James, "Rhonda's Eyes". 5 Alarm Music, Jazz a la Carte – Disc 2 (track 10).) Otto Sieben (Note: Otto Sieben, "Dad's Boogie A". Sonoton Music, SCD 372, The Cool Hot Daddies - Neo Swing (track 1).) and Dick Walter. (Note: Dick Walter, "The Seduction". KPM Music, KPM 369, Cinema, Storytelling and Adventure – Part Three (track 10).)

A Nero Wolfe Mystery was released on DVD by A&E Home Video (ISBN 0-7670-8893-X). "Motherhunt" is one of three telefilms initially aired in two parts that A&E released as a "double episode" with a single set of titles and credits (Note: "Motherhunt" (disc 5), "Too Many Clients" (disc 6) and "The Silent Speaker" (disc 7) are issued by A&E Home Video as continuous films with a single set of titles and credits. Other two-part films ("Champagne for One," "Prisoner's Base," "Over My Dead Body") are split into separate episodes as they originally aired on A&E.)—as it was presented outside of North America. A region-free set of the complete series was released in 2012 by independent Australian DVD distributor Shock Entertainment, which also made the series available through Australian iTunes. All DVD releases to date present "Motherhunt" in 4:3 pan and scan rather than its 16:9 aspect ratio for widescreen viewing.

The adaptation is very faithful to the novel except for moving the setting to the show's 1950s timeframe and a few minor changes in detail, such as Lucy's beach house becomes a country house, Lucy being interested in preventing killer fog from occurring in New York City, and Ellen Tenzer being found slain on a fire escape instead of in her car.

== Publication history ==
Collins Crime Club released the British first edition in 1964, with a dust jacket design by John Rose

- 1963, New York: The Viking Press, July 18, 1963, hardcover

Bookseller and publisher Otto Penzler describes the first edition of The Mother Hunt: "Gray cloth, front cover printed with blue and pink ornament; spine printed with blue and pink rectangles allowing lettering to drop out; rear cover blank. Issued in a mainly white dust wrapper." In April 2006, Firsts: The Book Collector's Magazine estimated that the first edition of The Mother Hunt had a value of between $150 and $300. The estimate is for a copy in very good to fine condition in a like dustjacket.

- 1963, Toronto: Macmillan, 1963, hardcover
- 1963, New York: Viking (Mystery Guild), October 1963, hardcover (Note: The far less valuable Viking book club edition may be distinguished from the first edition in three ways: The dust jacket has "Book Club Edition" printed on the inside front flap, and the price is absent (first editions may be price clipped if they were given as gifts).; Book club editions are sometimes thinner and always taller (usually a quarter of an inch) than first editions.; Book club editions are bound in cardboard, and first editions are bound in cloth (or have at least a cloth spine).)
- 1964, London: Collins Crime Club, January 20, 1964, hardcover
- 1964, New York: Bantam #F2828, July 1964, paperback
- 1966, London: Fontana #1184, February 1966, paperback
- 1993, New York: Bantam Crimeline ISBN 0-553-24737-9 May 1993, paperback, Rex Stout Library edition with introduction by Marilyn Wallace
- 2002, Auburn, California: The Audio Partners Publishing Corp., Mystery Masters ISBN 1-57270-276-1 October 2002, audio cassette (unabridged, read by Michael Prichard)
- 2010, New York: Bantam Crimeline ISBN 978-0-307-75605-3 June 16, 2010, e-book
