= Nero Wolfe supporting characters =

The Nero Wolfe stories are populated by a cast of supporting characters who help sustain the sense that each story takes place in familiar surroundings. The main characters are Nero Wolfe, a usually stay-at-home armchair detective and Archie Goodwin, his experienced paid associate detective who lives at Wolfe's New York City home.

== Household ==
=== Fritz Brenner ===
Fritz Brenner is an exceptionally talented Swiss cook who prepares and serves all of Wolfe's meals except those that Wolfe occasionally takes at Rusterman's Restaurant. Though both his first and last names are of German origin, Fritz himself was born in a French part of Switzerland, speaks French and English, and subscribes to a French-language newspaper. Fritz also acts as the household's majordomo and butler. Initially, in Fer-de-Lance, Fritz is said to live on the third floor of Wolfe's house, opposite the plant rooms. Later, the plant rooms are said to take up the entire third floor, and Fritz's living quarters are in the basement of Wolfe's brownstone; here he keeps 294 cookbooks on 11 shelves, the head of a wild boar he shot in the Vosges, and busts of Escoffier and Brillat-Savarin as well as a cooking vessel thought to have been used by Julius Caesar's chef. A reference to a war wound in 1935's The League of Frightened Men implies that Fritz fought in World War I.

Archie and Fritz have a generally amicable working relationship, and Archie frequently spends time with Fritz in the kitchen, which he refers to as "chinning". Fritz and Wolfe occasionally disagree over the preparation of meals; in one instance, Wolfe refuses to eat a dish after Fritz uses tarragon and saffron instead of sage to season starlings.

In Champagne for One it is noted that Fritz is very interested in Wolfe getting new clients, since the fees they pay Wolfe are the source from which Fritz's own salary is derived. Fritz can become anxious when a long time passes without a new paying client appearing. However, when the new client does arrive, Fritz is singularly uninterested in the details of the mystery, being supremely confident that Wolfe will solve it and duly collect his fee. When Archie is unavailable Fritz fields phone calls and follows Wolfe's instructions regarding callers at the front door, but his involvement in business is limited to taking messages (and serving drinks and snacks to clients in Wolfe's office). When Wolfe does not want his own and Archie's movements to be known, he arranges for Fritz to be able to claim truthfully that he does not know where they are or when they will return.

In the Columbia Pictures feature film Meet Nero Wolfe (1936), the character of Fritz was transformed into a Scandinavian cook named Olaf, played by John Qualen.

In the ABC-TV movie Nero Wolfe (1977), Fritz is portrayed by David Hurst. In the NBC TV series Nero Wolfe (1981), Fritz Brenner is played by George Voskovec. In the A&E TV original series A Nero Wolfe Mystery, Fritz is played by Colin Fox.

=== Theodore Horstmann ===
Mr. Wolfe has always pampered you because you're the best orchid nurse alive. This is as good a time as any to tell you that you remind me of sour milk.

— Archie Goodwin to Theodore after discovering Wolfe has left the brownstone in In the Best Families (1950), chapter 6

Theodore Horstmann is a world-class orchid expert who assists Wolfe in the plant rooms. (Although as Horstmann is said to spend up to 12 hours a day with the plants, and Wolfe only four, one might argue that Wolfe assists Horstmann.) His living arrangements are one of the more glaring inconsistencies in the series. Horstmann's living quarters in 1934's Fer-de-Lance are adjacent to the plant rooms on the top floor of the brownstone. Later, the plant rooms are said to take up the entire top floor, and by the time of 1946's The Silent Speaker, Archie's commentary flatly states that Theodore has separate living arrangements outside the house, noting that Wolfe is not letting Horstmann in on a complex deception he has orchestrated because Horstmann might accidentally let slip the truth when away from Wolfe's home. But then, in the 1949 short story "Door To Death", Horstmann is most unambiguously said to be a live-in resident of the brownstone. Later, the arrangement changes again, and in Gambit (1962) and The Doorbell Rang (1965), it is made very clear that Horstmann is not a live-in resident of the brownstone.

In the first Wolfe book, Fer-de-Lance, Archie remarks that he sometimes hears "old Horstmann" yelling at Wolfe, who "seemed to have the same effect on Horstmann that an umpire had on John J. McGraw," though he is sure that Theodore does not dislike Wolfe.

Though not an entirely offstage character, Horstmann very seldom appears in person in the narratives, and rarely has an impact on the story. In "Door to Death", he provides a plot device, as his extended absence forces Wolfe to find another orchid tender. In "Black Orchids", though, Theodore's actions are central to the denouement, and in chapter five of The Second Confession, Wolfe becomes concerned for Theodore's safety after the plant rooms are badly damaged by gunfire.

In spite of the great emphasis on food and eating throughout the series, little mention is made of where, when, or what Horstmann eats, except that in Plot It Yourself he is said to eat in the kitchen with Fritz, although this is never seen or otherwise mentioned. He is also never depicted as eating at the table with Wolfe, Archie, or Wolfe's guests. Theodore has a sister in New Jersey and sometimes spends his Sundays there. In "Door to Death," he travels to Illinois by train, to visit his mother, who has taken ill.

Theodore is portrayed by Robert Coote in the NBC TV series Nero Wolfe (1981). In the A&E TV original series A Nero Wolfe Mystery, Theodore is an unseen character. He is regularly mentioned as being present in the brownstone, and Wolfe is seen speaking to him on the house phone on occasion, but the character himself is never seen or heard on screen. In one episode, Inspector Cramer demands to speak to him (but ultimately does not get to).

== The 'teers ==
Saul Panzer, Fred Durkin, and Orrie Cather are collectively known as the 'teers, the three freelance detectives who make up the extended professional family. Though Wolfe hired a range of freelance operators, after the first few novels the 'teers were always Wolfe's first choices when extra manpower was needed. If only one extra detective was needed, Saul Panzer was the automatic first choice.

"They were the three 'teers because once at a conference Orrie had said they were the three musketeers and we had tried to change it to fit," Archie writes in The Father Hunt (1968, chapter 11). "We tried snoopeteers, privateers (for private eyes), dicketeers, wolfeteers, hawketeers, and others, and ended up by deciding that none of them was good enough and settling for the three 'teers."

Although he possesses a formidable memory, Archie begins chapter 7 of A Family Affair (1975) – reporting a meeting of Saul, Fred, and Orrie in Wolfe's office – by writing, "I forget who once called them the Three Musketeers." In the short story "Counterfeit for Murder," he expresses his respective opinions of the three by commenting on their hourly rates and relative worth: "[Saul Panzer's] rate is ten dollars an hour and he is worth twenty. Fred Durkin's rate is seven dollars and he is worth seven-fifty. Orrie Cather's rate is also seven dollars and he is worth six-fifty."

=== Saul Panzer ===
That is Mr. Panzer, there at the end of Mr. Goodwin's desk. If he ever wants to know anything about you, tell him; you might as well.

— Nero Wolfe in Murder by the Book (1951), chapter 22

Saul Panzer is a top-notch private detective who is frequently hired by Wolfe either to assist Archie or to carry out assignments that Wolfe prefers that Archie not know about or for which Archie cannot be spared. Panzer is not an impressive-looking character; he dresses sloppily, has a big nose, and almost always needs a shave. In "Counterfeit for Murder", he is "undersized and wiry" and looks like he "could be a hackie." Archie and Wolfe respect Saul immensely. He charges much higher fees than other New York detectives, but Archie insists that he is worth it. "With an office and a staff, he could have cleaned up," Archie writes in chapter 6 of Champagne for One (1958), "but that wouldn't have left him enough time for playing the piano or playing pinochle or keeping up with his reading, so he preferred to free-lance at seventy bucks a day" – equivalent to more than $600 today.

Saul has an eidetic memory, which Archie frequently comments is better than his own, and an uncanny ability to connect people's names and identities permanently with their faces in his mind, even with only a glance. When a character in the 1947 novel Too Many Women (chapter 26) insists that Saul must have mistakenly identified someone else as her, Archie comments to Wolfe, "… with Saul, you know how good that is. Even if she has a twin, it was her." Wolfe emphatically agrees.

Saul's marital status is one of the inconsistencies in the corpus. "He is himself a bachelor," Wolfe tells Hilda Lindquist in The Rubber Band (1936, chapter 7). A change is indicated in the 1948 novella "Bullet for One" (chapter 7), when Wolfe asks Saul about his family. In "Door to Death" (1949, chapter 7), Archie leaves a phone message with Saul's wife in Brooklyn. Saul has a wife and children in Brooklyn in The Second Confession (1949, chapter 5); he has a wife and children in In the Best Families (1950, chapter 14).

No mention is made of Saul's wife or children after 1950, though, and readers are left to decide whether the marriage ended, or Saul's family was simply retconned out of existence. In "The Next Witness", first published in May 1955, Saul has an apartment in Manhattan to himself. He lives alone on the fifth (top) floor of a remodeled house on 38th Street, between Lexington and Third Avenues. In chapter 4, Archie describes Saul's living room, which Wolfe deems "a good room" when he sees it for the first time:

It was a big room, lighted with two floor lamps and two table lamps. One wall had windows, another was solid with books, and the other two had pictures and shelves that were cluttered with everything from chunks of minerals to walrus tusks. In the far corner was a grand piano. (Note: The room is described verbatim in "Fourth of July Picnic" (1957, chapter 6) – a story in which Wolfe again visits it – and A Family Affair (1975, chapter 15).)

The role of Saul Panzer is played by George Wyner in the NBC TV series Nero Wolfe (1981); by Saul Rubinek in the A&E original film The Golden Spiders: A Nero Wolfe Mystery (2000); and by Conrad Dunn in the A&E TV series A Nero Wolfe Mystery (2001–2002).

=== Fred Durkin ===
Fred Durkin is a blue-collar investigator who is often hired for mundane tasks such as surveillance. In "Counterfeit for Murder", he is described as "broad and burly and bald" and might be mistaken for "a piano mover."

In his earliest appearances, Archie is very dismissive of Durkin, calling him "dumb". However, over the course of the series, Archie gradually comes to appreciate Fred more; though not prone to flashes of insight, Fred Durkin is reliably hard-working and stubborn about getting details right. In the novella "Kill Now—Pay Later," Archie opines that Fred "wasn't in Saul's class but was way above average."

Married (his wife's name is Fanny) with several children, Fred is honest and likable, but unsophisticated. He is often nervous around Wolfe, whom he once offended by stirring vinegar into a roux for squab at Wolfe's table. To curry favor with Wolfe, he sometimes accepts Wolfe's offer of beer, though Archie has heard Fred call beer "slop".

In later works, Archie Goodwin notes that Fred is "worth at least half as much as Saul – which was his price," and also approvingly notes that, unlike some other detectives, Fred knows his limitations and works extremely well within them. In Might As Well be Dead Fred turns down an assignment from Wolfe that would involve him impersonating an editor, as he feels maintaining such a persona is beyond his skill set. In The Golden Spiders, Wolfe is willing to disburse more than twice as much expense money to Fred than to Orrie and Saul, remarking that Fred never goes over budget when given cash.

In the A&E TV series A Nero Wolfe Mystery (2001–2002) and the series pilot, The Golden Spiders: A Nero Wolfe Mystery (2000), the role of Fred Durkin is played by Fulvio Cecere.

=== Orrie Cather ===
As I entered, Orrie got up and moved to the couch. He has not entirely given up the idea that someday my desk and chair will be his for good, and he likes to practice sitting there when I am not present.

— Archie Goodwin writing in Champagne for One (1958), chapter 8

Orrie Cather is a handsome, personable detective, someone people want to tell things—but he can be too full of himself. In The Mother Hunt (chapter 9), after Wolfe leaves it to Saul to teach Orrie better manners, Archie warns Wolfe, "You know, if you pile it on enough to give Orrie an inferiority complex, it will be a lulu, and a damn good op will be ruined." But Archie, too, has an occasional run-in with Orrie, who thinks he would look just fine sitting at Archie's desk. In Counterfeit for Murder, he is described as "tall and trim and dressy", someone who might mistaken for "an automobile salesman".

Orrie's talents as a professional operative are much narrower than Archie's. He has neither Saul Panzer's genius for tailing nor Fred Durkin's bulldog tenacity, and he is more willing than the others to take less-than-legal shortcuts. He is more than competent, and Stout furnishes him more complex motives than he does Saul or Fred. Ambiguities in Orrie's character are introduced as early as The League of Frightened Men (1935). (Note: In chapter 11 of The League of Frightened Men Orrie tells Wolfe and Archie about a prank he played on a lonely soldier he knew in the army. His shallowness and insensitivity draws Archie's comment, "It took brains to think up one as good as that"; and Wolfe looks at Orrie, shuts his eyes for a few seconds, and opens them again. Orrie leaves the room whistling.) In 1966's Death of a Doxy, in which he is accused of murder, the state of Orrie's character forces Wolfe and his associates to debate whether or not he is capable of the crime. Wolfe himself states, "You must know that I have no affection for him", and Saul is of the same opinion. In Champagne for One Orrie pulls a major coup, breaking into a suspect's apartment and finding a key document on which the solution of the book's mystery largely hinges—a document that he insists upon handing to Wolfe personally rather than through Goodwin (who reluctantly admits that that was Orrie's due). Orrie also plays a key role in the last Nero Wolfe novel, A Family Affair.

Orrie's full first name is one of the inconsistencies in the corpus. In chapter 16 of The Golden Spiders (1953), clothing store owner Bernard Levine states that he was shown "a New York detective license with his picture on it and his name, Orvald Cather." In chapter 3 of If Death Ever Slept, Archie calls the office and Orrie answers the phone, "Nero Wolfe's residence. Orville Cather speaking." And, thinking he was clarifying the matter, Rex Stout's biographer John McAleer asked the author, "Is Orrie Cather's given name Orrin?" "Probably," Stout replied.

In the A&E TV series A Nero Wolfe Mystery (2001–2002) and the series pilot, The Golden Spiders: A Nero Wolfe Mystery (2000), the role of Orrie Cather is played by Trent McMullen.

== Law enforcement officials ==
"I am much kinder to the police than most writers of detective stories," Rex Stout said. "My two main police characters, Cramer and Stebbins, are neither stupid nor brutal, and, judging from letters I get from readers, they are likable."

=== Inspector Cramer ===
Cramer stuck the cigar between his lips and clamped his teeth on it. I had seen him light one only once, years ago. The cigar had a specific function, the idea being that with his teeth closed on it he couldn't speak the words that were on his tongue, and that gave him time to swallow them and substitute others.

— Archie Goodwin writing in Plot It Yourself (1959), Chapter 10

Inspector Cramer, head of the New York Police Department's Homicide Division, is Wolfe's main foil. Cramer collaborates with Wolfe in the majority of the novels and short stories, but resents the high-handed manner in which Wolfe pursues his investigations – particularly Wolfe's tendency to manipulate murderers into committing suicide rather than allowing them to face trial. Cramer is usually assisted by Sergeant Purley Stebbins, and at times by Lt. George Rowcliff, Archie's personal nemesis.

Wolfe and Archie collaborate with Cramer on his homicide cases, but the relationship is a contentious one. Wolfe regularly and deliberately withholds information from Cramer to ensure that Wolfe, rather than the police, will solve a case. In return, Cramer has enjoyed twitting Wolfe by rising from the red leather chair without using his arms for leverage – something that Wolfe cannot do. Nearly every novel that involves Cramer shows him calling on Wolfe in a barely suppressed rage, demanding the information he is sure – sometimes quite rightly – that Wolfe is withholding.

Despite their argumentative relationship, Cramer has considerable respect for Wolfe's investigative skill. In The Doorbell Rang, Cramer goes to some lengths to keep the state of New York from taking Wolfe and Archie's licenses as private investigators, and in In the Best Families, Cramer says, "Wolfe is too cocky to live ... I would love to bloody his nose for him. I've tried to often enough, and someday I will and enjoy it. But I would hate to see him break his neck on a deal like this where he hasn't got a chance." Cramer is also grateful to Wolfe for saving his job in The Silent Speaker, and at the end of that book, Cramer expresses his gratitude by bringing Wolfe " ... a misshapen object covered with green florist's paper" that turns out to be an orchid. In return, Wolfe holds the inspector in high regard, admiring his tenacity and preferring to deal with him than any other member of the police force.

For example, speaking of Cramer, Wolfe says, "By luck I had made a hole in the wall and I've let him through, and if you knew him as I do you would realize that he can't be chased out again." Cramer is aware that Wolfe appreciates the Homicide Division's capabilities: "As conceited as you are, Wolfe, you told me once that I am better equipped to handle nine murder cases out of ten than you are."

Cramer shares few, if any, of Wolfe's tastes; in the story "Black Orchids", for example, Wolfe exclaims that the black orchids are unique, matchless, and incomparable, Cramer replies, "They're pretty ... Kind of drab, though. Not much color. I like geraniums better."

One taste that Cramer does share with Wolfe is that he appears to enjoy a good beer. Wolfe often offers him one, except when the visit is particularly contentious. Cramer almost always declines, claiming not to have the time. But on the occasion that he accepts, he appears to actually enjoy the less formal chat with Wolfe over a beer.

Cramer is a cigar chewer. In early Nero Wolfe novels, Cramer lights and smokes them (in The League of Frightened Men he smokes a pipe), but in later novels, Archie notes that Cramer only chews on cigars and has never been known to light one. Cramer often ends his visits to Wolfe's office by angrily throwing his chewed cigar at the wastebasket, usually missing the target. Archie suspects that the cigars give Cramer a moment to calm down before he says something regrettable.

Cramer is married and has a son, who fights in the Australian theater during World War II. He also mentions he has a daughter who attends high school pre-war.

Cramer is (or at least once was) a close friend of the Rowans and has known Lily Rowan since her early childhood. He expresses clear dislike at the prospect of investigating her connection to one of Wolfe's cases, in which she may be a suspect (Not Quite Dead Enough). He considers Lily's father one of his best friends with whose help he got on the force.

Cramer's first name is given once only, as Fergus, in 1940's Where There's a Will (chapter 17). However, his initials are later given as "L.T.C." in 1946's The Silent Speaker, due to Stout's failure to recall that he had earlier given Cramer a first name. This led to Robert Goldsborough giving him the full name of "Lionel T. Cramer" in Goldsborough's version of Nero Wolfe novels. "To me he is just Inspector Cramer," Stout said.

Cramer is the protagonist of one Stout novel, Red Threads (1939). This novel does not feature Wolfe or any of his employees, but does have appearances from some tertiary series characters like Police Commissioner Humbert and District Attorney Skinner.

Inspector Cramer was portrayed by Biff McGuire in the 1977 TV movie Nero Wolfe, by Allan Miller in NBC TV's 1981 series, and by Sergey Parshin in Russian TV-series Nero Wolfe and Archie Goodwin (2001–2002). In the A&E TV series A Nero Wolfe Mystery (2001–2002), the role of Inspector Cramer is played by Bill Smitrovich. Archie hears him called Fergus in the episode "The Silent Speaker", when he makes the brief acquaintance of Mrs. Cramer.

=== Sergeant Purley Stebbins ===
Sergeant Purley Stebbins is Inspector Cramer's assistant. Stebbins is in many ways the archetypal good cop: tough, brave, and dedicated, but also gruff and unpolished. Stebbins is ambivalent about Archie, and Archie makes frequent references to the few times Stebbins has let his guard down and called him by his first name. Archie believes that Stebbins harbors some resentment toward him due to the great discrepancy in their salaries, but Stebbins recognizes Archie as an expert and talented detective. In Champagne for One, Stebbins' keen observation of the behavior of a group of murder suspects earns a comment of admiration from Wolfe. He also appears in the Alphabet Hicks short story "By His Own Hand (Curtain Line)" published in April 1955.

In the A&E TV series, the role of Purley Stebbins is played by R.D. Reid.

=== Lieutenant Rowcliff ===
We were fairly even – he set my teeth on edge about the same as I did his – until one day I got the notion of stuttering. When he gets worked up to a certain point he starts to stutter. My idea was to wait till he was about there and then stutter just once. It more than met expectations. It made him so mad he had to stutter, he couldn't help it, and then I complained that he was mimicking me. From that day on I have had the long end and he knows it.

— Archie Goodwin on Lieutenant Rowcliff in Murder by the Book (1951), Chapter 5

Lieutenant George Rowcliff is a police lieutenant for whom Wolfe harbors special animus, partly due to an incident in which Rowcliff took Wolfe into custody. As Wolfe once put it, "This whole performance is based on an idiotic assumption, which was natural and indeed inevitable, since Mr. Rowcliff is your champion ass – the assumption that Mr. Goodwin and I are both cretins." As noted above, Rowcliff starts to stutter when he is sufficiently angry or frustrated; Archie sometimes makes a private game of seeing how quickly he can bring Rowcliff to this point, and occasionally affects the stutter to goad him into it.

As with Cramer, Stout made a continuity error in Rowcliff's first name. Though it is given as George elsewhere, in Please Pass the Guilt, his first two initials are stated as "J.M." in a letter dictated by Wolfe. There is also inconsistency in the spelling of the lieutenant's surname; it occasionally appears as "Rowcliffe." (This variant is the version that appears in The Silent Speaker, the same novel in which the continuity error regarding Cramer's first name is introduced.)

Rowcliff is the only character acknowledged by Stout to have been consciously modeled and named after a real-life person – a young naval attache under whom Stout served while a yeoman on Theodore Roosevelt's presidential yacht Mayflower in 1906–07 and to whom Stout took an intense and enduring dislike. Whether or not the connection between the real and fictional Rowcliffs was known contemporaneously, clearly the source of Stout’s obnoxious cop suffered no ill effects professionally: Gilbert Jonathan Rowcliff went on to a distinguished naval career spanning both world wars, at sea as an honored commander and in Washington as judge advocate general, a position he assumed in June 1936, shortly after his namesake was introduced in The Rubber Band. Also, whether or not the naval Rowcliff followed Stout’s career or read and recognized himself in the Nero Wolfe books, Stout clearly followed his; in an interview with John McAleer, the author dead-panned, “he retired in December 1945, with the rank of rear admiral.”

The role of Rowcliff is played by Bill MacDonald in the A&E TV series.

=== Others ===
- Police Commissioner Hombert – In some of the novels, the New York police commissioner. A politician, rather than a policeman, he is not especially respected by either Wolfe or Cramer. (Note: In The Rubber Band (1936) Wolfe respects Cramer, but thinks Hombert "should go back to diapers" – an opinion supported by Cramer, who points out that Hombert is a politician, not a policeman. In The Silent Speaker, Wolfe threatens to stand mute, thus prolonging the a public relations fiasco for the NIA, a politically powerful organization. The threat forces Hombert's hand and helps Cramer in the process.)
- Skinner – district attorney for Manhattan
- Mandelbaum (aka Mandel) – assistant district attorney for Manhattan.
- Cleveland Archer – district attorney in Westchester County
- Ben Dykes – head of detectives for Westchester County
- Con Noonan – lieutenant with the New York State Police, a suburban version of Lieutenant Rowcliff
- Richard Wragg – FBI Special Agent in Charge of the New York Office

== Friends ==
=== Lon Cohen ===
If Lon Cohen had a title, I didn't know what it was and I doubt if he did. Just his name was on the door of the little room on the twentieth floor, two doors down from the corner office of the publisher, and in that situation you would think he would be out of the dust stirred up by the daily whirlwind of a newspaper, but he always seemed to be up, not only on what had just happened but on what was just going to happen.

— Archie Goodwin writing in Too Many Clients (1960), chapter 2

Lon Cohen is a journalist near the top of the fictional New York Gazette, a major New York daily newspaper. Lon is Archie's pipeline to breaking crime news, and Archie frequently asks Lon for background information on current or prospective clients.

Archie, Lon, and some other Wolfe regulars play poker Thursday nights at Saul Panzer's apartment.

Over the years, Wolfe and the Gazette develop a symbiotic relationship that gives the newspaper exclusive information regarding Wolfe's cases, and that gives Wolfe publicity – sometimes more than he would want.

Lon Cohen first appeared in the 1946 novel, The Silent Speaker (chapter 8). Prior to that, the detectives used other contacts from the Gazette, such as Harry Foster in Fer-de-Lance.

In The Second Confession (chapter 19), Archie says Lon had risen to "second in command at the Gazette's city desk," and by A Right to Die (chapter 5) he is "confidential assistant to the publisher of the Gazette." Lon's role at the New York Gazette is not further detailed in the Rex Stout stories, and in fact, in later books Archie explicitly states that he is not entirely sure what Lon's exact job entails. Lon's actual job duties later become central to the story line in Robert Goldsborough's novel Death on Deadline.

In the 1977 TV movie Nero Wolfe, Lon Cohen is played by John Randolph. In the A&E TV series A Nero Wolfe Mystery (2001–2002), Lon Cohen is played by Saul Rubinek. In the pilot film The Golden Spiders: A Nero Wolfe Mystery (2000), he was played by Gerry Quigley.

=== Lily Rowan ===
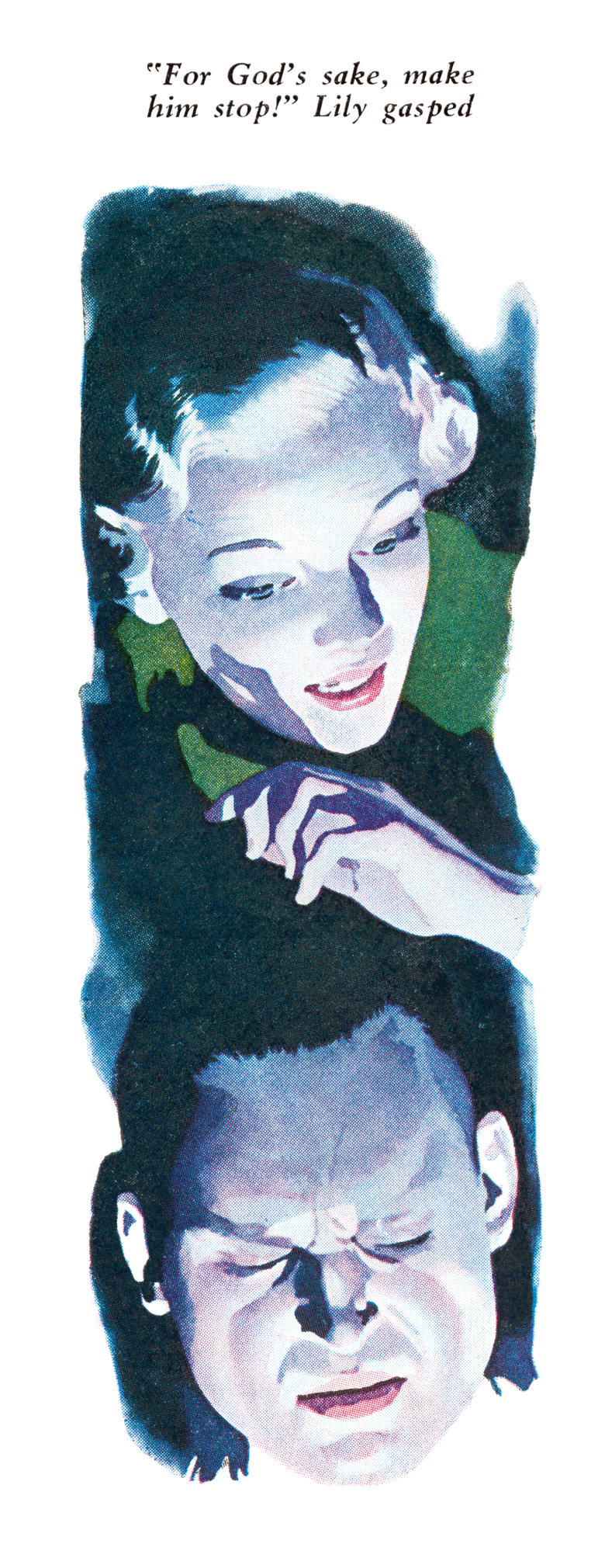
Lily sees the red bull with Clyde Osgood's body in Some Buried Caesar (chapter 4)

I'm the only woman in America who has necked with Nero Wolfe.

— Lily Rowan in In the Best Families (1950), chapter 14

Lily Rowan, heiress and socialite, often appears as Archie Goodwin's romantic companion, although the relationship is not an exclusive one. Lily and Archie meet in Some Buried Caesar, in which she calls him "Escamillo" after his near-encounters with a pastured bull. Subsequently, she appears in several stories (and is mentioned in passing in others) and provides needed assistance on occasion (see, particularly, In the Best Families and A Right to Die).

Lily is one of the few women for whom Nero Wolfe has a grudging respect: "I have not only eaten her bread and salt, I have eaten her grouse. I am in her debt."

Lily's father, who made his money building New York's sewer system and was a power in Tammany Hall, helped Inspector Cramer get started at the NYPD; this background connection with Cramer surfaces in one of the early stories, "Not Quite Dead Enough", when Cramer expresses discomfort about dealing with Lily as a murder suspect, but does not come up again in the series.

In four episodes of the A&E TV series A Nero Wolfe Mystery (2001–2002) – "Door to Death", "Christmas Party" and "Death of a Doxy" Parts I and II – the role of Lily Rowan is played by Kari Matchett.

=== Others ===
- Marko Vukčić – A fellow Montenegrin whom Wolfe has known since childhood. Marko owns the upscale Rusterman's Restaurant in Manhattan. In later novels, Wolfe acts as the restaurant's trustee following Marko's murder in The Black Mountain.
- Lewis Hewitt – Well-heeled orchid fancier, whom Wolfe saved from notoriety (as told in "Black Orchids"). During a prolonged absence, Wolfe arranges for his orchids to be cared for at Hewitt's estate. Hewitt is a member of the Ten for Aristology, a group of gourmets that figures in "Poison à la Carte" and The Doorbell Rang. In the A&E TV series A Nero Wolfe Mystery the role of Hewitt is played by David Hemblen.
- Nathaniel Parker – Wolfe's lawyer (and occasionally a client's lawyer, on Wolfe's recommendation) when only a lawyer will do. Parker succeeded Henry H. Barber, who played this role earlier in the series. On the way from Henry Barber to Nathaniel Parker, Wolfe consults Henry Parker in chapter 9 of The Golden Spiders. Parker is well educated: for example, Parker converses with Wolfe in French during the story "Immune to Murder". In the A&E TV series A Nero Wolfe Mystery, Parker was played by Hrant Alianak in "Prisoner's Base," and by George Plimpton in "Death of a Doxy" and "Murder is Corny."
- Edwin A. "Doc" Vollmer – A medical doctor who is Wolfe's neighbor and occasional confidante. In the novel The Silent Speaker, Vollmer certifies an illness severe enough that Wolfe cannot be interrogated by the police. In the novel Please Pass the Guilt, Wolfe and Goodwin become involved in a murder case by doing a favor for Vollmer and his friend Irwin Ostrow, who runs a crisis intervention center. In the A&E television series A Nero Wolfe Mystery Vollmer was played by Ken Kramer in "The Doorbell Rang" and "Disguise for Murder," and by Joe Flaherty in "The Silent Speaker."
- Carla Lovchen – Wolfe's adopted daughter, who appears in two stories, Over My Dead Body and The Black Mountain. (Note: "Lovchen" is not a family name; rather, it is one name for Montenegro's eponymous black mountain.) Her murder in The Black Mountain, as well as that of Marko Vukčić, prompts Wolfe to leave the country for the only time in the series and return to Montenegro. In the A&E television series A Nero Wolfe Mystery Carla Lovchen was played by Kari Matchett in the concluding episode of the first season, "Over My Dead Body."
- Felix Courbet – Part owner and manager of Rusterman's Restaurant following the death of Marko Vukčić. Felix plays a major role in both "Poison à la Carte" and A Family Affair, in which his surname is changed to Mauer. In The Black Mountain his surname is Martin. In the adaptation of "Poison à la Carte" for the A&E TV series A Nero Wolfe Mystery Felix is played by Carlo Rota.

== Freelance operatives ==
The three 'teers were always Wolfe's first choice when hiring extra manpower for a job. In certain specialized cases where a man would be unsuitable for the particular assignment, two female detectives are sometimes called upon:

=== Dol Bonner ===
Theodolinda "Dol" Bonner is a smart, attractive female private detective, introduced as the protagonist of Rex Stout's 1937 novel The Hand in the Glove. Head of her own detective agency, she makes another appearance in Stout's Tecumseh Fox novel Bad for Business (1940). Dol plays a major role in the Nero Wolfe novella "Too Many Detectives", and she is employed by Wolfe in If Death Ever Slept and Plot It Yourself.

In Lady Against the Odds, a 1992 TV adaptation of The Hand in the Glove, Dol Bonner is played by Crystal Bernard.

=== Sally Corbett ===
Wolfe and Archie first meet Dol Bonner's assistant Sally Corbett (also known as Sally Colt) in the first chapter of "Too Many Detectives", when they are summoned to Albany for questioning about wiretapping activities. Archie starts his report by stating, "I am against female detectives on principle." Still Sally Colt, she is again called on to help out in If Death Ever Slept. In Plot It Yourself, it is a Sally Corbett, not Colt, who helps out on Wolfe's case: "Sally Corbett was one of the two women who, a couple of years back, had made me feel that there might be some flaw in my attitude toward female dicks," Archie writes. Sally Colt/Corbett makes a final appearance in The Mother Hunt, in which Archie again remarks that Sally and Dol had made him change his attitude about female detectives.

Sally Corbett is played by Manon von Gerkan in "Motherhunt", part of the second season of the A&E original series Nero Wolfe (2001–2002).

=== Others ===
Wolfe generally only called on these operatives in cases where manpower beyond the three 'teers was needed, or when one of the 'teers was unavailable, or when certain specialized talents were required.

- Bill Gore – Freelance operative occasionally called in when Wolfe requires additional help in the field. Very early on, in The League Of Frightened Men, Bill is actually third on the list of operatives Wolfe calls upon – behind Saul and Fred but ahead of Orrie Cather. Big, muscular and not especially bright, Bill's chief attributes are his size, stamina and determination. As well, having decided that Archie is a funny guy, he laughs at all Archie's quips and comments, even if he doesn't understand them. Despite Wolfe's apparent early approval of Bill, he is infrequently seen and makes his last appearance in 1955's Before Midnight, although he is mentioned in passing in at least one later Stout story (1957's "Christmas Party"). He is glimpsed again in some of Goldsborough's books more than 30 years after his previous appearance.
- Johnny Keems – Freelance operative occasionally called in by Wolfe. Flashy, and prone to showboating, Johnny is generally reliable if given specific instructions. He is married, though we never learn anything about his wife. He makes his last appearance in the novel Might as Well Be Dead, where he is killed by a hit-and-run driver. Johnny, like Orrie, is said by Archie to covet his (Archie's) job, and like Fred, is extremely trustworthy with expense money.
- Del Bascom – Independent investigator who runs a large detective agency in Manhattan. Wolfe sometimes subcontracts to Bascom when he needs more operatives than usual (The Silent Speaker, for example).
- Herb Aronson and Al Goller – Cabdrivers hired by Archie for mobile surveillance work.
- Ethelbert (or "Geoffrey") Hitchcock – Wolfe's contact in London who handles inquiries to be made in Europe.

== Arnold Zeck ==
Arnold Zeck appears in three Nero Wolfe novels: And Be a Villain, The Second Confession, and In the Best Families. Zeck is a mysterious and powerful crime boss, possessed of a superior intellect. He and Wolfe become mutual admirers and antagonists in the course of several cases; when he is first mentioned in And Be a Villain, Archie indicates that he became aware of Zeck following a telephone call to Wolfe made several months before the events of the novel during an unreported case, but Wolfe has warned him not to investigate any further and to do his best to forget that the criminal exists.

Wolfe summarises his activities and tactics in The Second Confession (1949) as follows: "He has varied and extensive sources of income. All of them are illegal and some of them are morally repulsive. Narcotics, smuggling, industrial and commercial rackets, gambling, waterfront blackguardism, professional larceny, blackmailing, political malfeasance – that by no means exhausts his curriculum, but it sufficiently indicates his character. He has, up to now, triumphantly kept himself invulnerable by having the perspicacity to see that a criminal practising on a large scale over a wide area and a long period of time can get impunity only by maintaining a gap between his person and his crimes which cannot be bridged; and by having unexcelled talent, a remorseless purpose and a will that cannot be dented or deflected." Wolfe considers Zeck the most dangerous criminal he has encountered in his career and informs Archie that any direct conflict between them would by necessity become a battle to the death, intimating that he would be compelled to abandon the brownstone and work to destroy Zeck utterly if such circumstances arose.

Zeck’s malevolent presence intrudes via telephone in two novels, And Be a Villain (1948) and The Second Confession (1949). In the latter, he sends gunmen to fire on Wolfe's orchid rooms in an attempt to dissuade Wolfe from investigating a case that could lead back to him. Zeck had previously telephoned Wolfe twice: on June 9, 1943, concerning Wolfe’s work for General Carpenter; and on January 16, 1946, regarding Mrs. Tremont. Zeck himself appears in In the Best Families (1950), the third book of what is popularly called The Zeck Trilogy, in which Nero Wolfe finds it necessary to defeat Zeck once and for all. In 1974, the Viking Press collected the three Zeck novels in an omnibus volume, Triple Zeck, and in 2016, Random House issued an e-book set of the three books titled The Zeck Trilogy.

"I was thrilled when Wolfe finally encountered his own Moriarty in the archvillain Arnold Zeck," wrote Michael Dirda, Pulitzer Prize-winning book critic for The Washington Post. British author and literary critic David Langford and others have compared the relationship between Zeck and Wolfe to that of Professor Moriarty and Sherlock Holmes.

As described in "In the Best Families", Zeck operates virtually unseen, out of an underground base which has several layers of security, and even his own gang mostly have no access to his presence. Mostly they will only hear his voice on the telephone, or in an outer room at the base. They won't meet him in person, making his defences very hard to penetrate.

The role of Arnold Zeck (renamed Arnold Dorso) is played by Robert Loggia in "In the Best Families", an episode of the 1981 NBC TV series Nero Wolfe.
