= Death of a Doxy =

Detective novel by Rex Stout

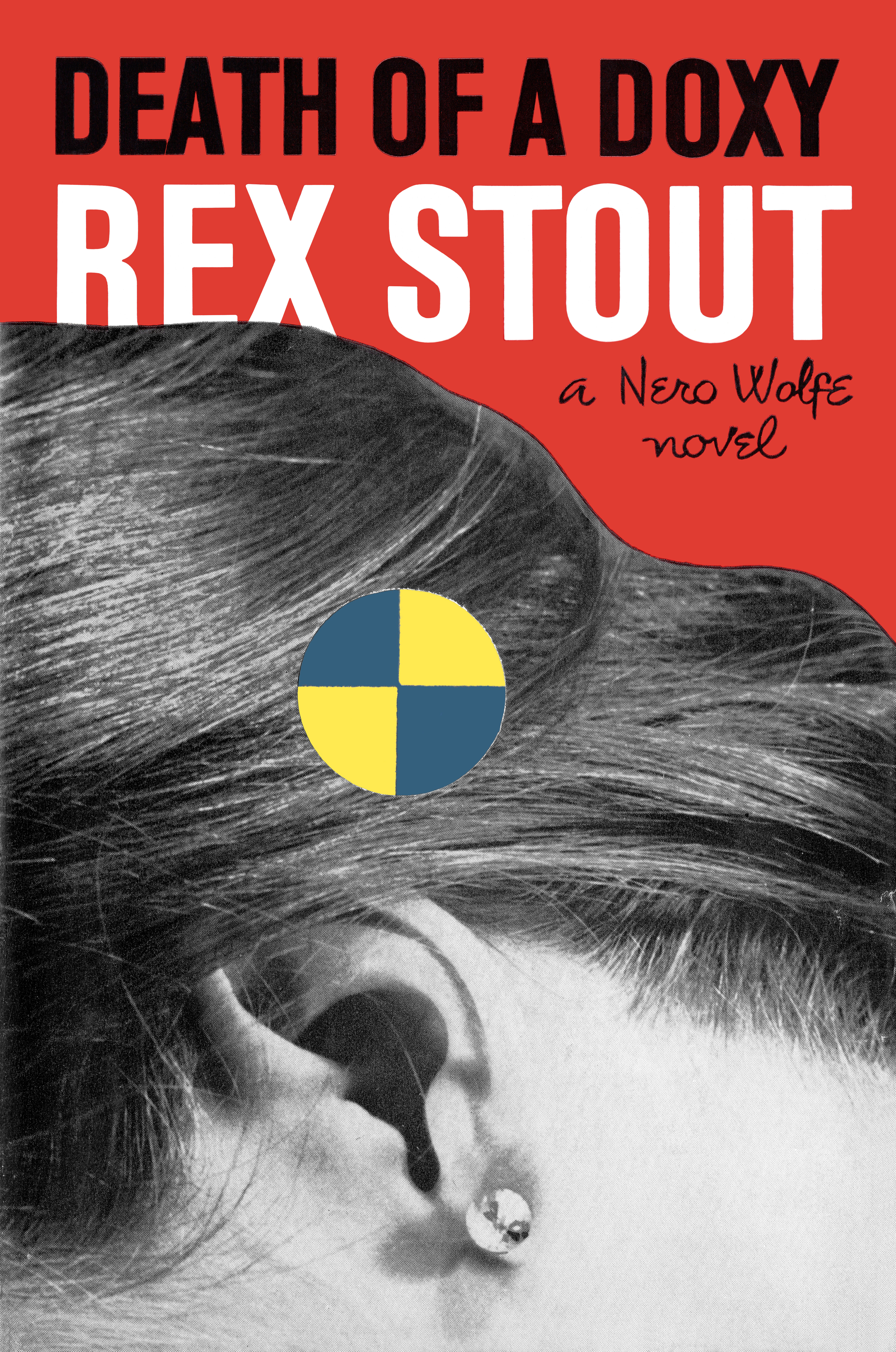
- Author: Rex Stout
- Cover artist: Bill English
- Language: English
- Series: Nero Wolfe
- Genre: Detective fiction
- Publisher: Viking Press
- Publication date: August 19, 1966
- Publication place: United States
- Media type: Print (Hardcover)
- Pages: 186 (first edition)
- OCLC: 12137566
- Preceded by: The Doorbell Rang
- Followed by: The Father Hunt

Death of a Doxy is a Nero Wolfe detective novel by Rex Stout, first published by Viking Press in 1966.

== Plot introduction ==
"My sister was a what?"
"D, O, X, Y, doxy. I happen to like that better than concubine or paramour or mistress. I don't—"
I stopped because I had to, to protect my face.

— Archie Goodwin, conversing with Stella Fleming in Death of a Doxy, chapter 5

Orrie Cather, one of Wolfe's operatives, has been secretly seeing a wealthy man's kept mistress at her secret lovenest. He is arrested when she turns up dead.

Orrie is the only one of Wolfe's operatives to have the plot of two Stout books turn on his actions: Death of a Doxy and Stout's final work, A Family Affair.

== Plot summary ==
Illustrated by Lou Feck, an abridged version of Death of a Doxy appeared in Argosy magazine (June 1967)

Orrie is finally going to tie the knot. He is engaged to marry Jill Hardy, a stewardess. But for months, Orrie's also been keeping company with Isabel Kerr, an ex-showgirl. Orrie has some time available, because Jill works international flights. Isabel also has time available, because she no longer performs: rather, she occupies a plush apartment that is paid for by another gentleman friend who visits her just two or three times a week.

Isabel objects to Orrie's marriage plans. She has taken some of his personal and professional belongings and stashed them in her apartment. Isabel threatens to show them to Jill and thus quash the marriage. So, Orrie asks Archie to get into Isabel's apartment, find his possessions, and get them back. When Archie does enter the apartment, he finds not Orrie's belongings but Isabel's body. Archie withdraws to meet with Orrie, but otherwise keeps the news to himself.

Isabel's sister Stella later discovers the body. The police find Orrie's possessions in the apartment and arrest him on suspicion of murder. In a meeting to consider whether Orrie is guilty, Wolfe, Archie, and Fred are all unsure, but Saul—via some convoluted reasoning—concludes that he is innocent, and Wolfe undertakes to demonstrate it.

Wolfe must determine who knew about Isabel's apartment. Orrie has given Archie some names—Avery Ballou, who pays the bills, Stella Fleming and her husband Barry, and a nightclub singer named Julie Jaquette. Archie visits Stella and Barry, and learns that Stella is frantic to keep a lid on the nature of her sister's living arrangements. Stella's concern for Isabel's reputation is such that she tries to claw Archie's face when he refers to Isabel as a "doxy" (prostitute).

Archie corrals a reluctant Ballou, and Wolfe coerces his cooperation by threatening disclosure of his relationship with Isabel. It turns out that Ballou has already been subjected to blackmail, by someone named Milton Thales. Ballou thinks that Thales is really Orrie. Wolfe recognizes the name of an early Greek sage, Thales of Miletus. That sage was perhaps the first mathematician, pointing to the math teacher who was brother-in-law of Isabel. Wolfe assumes that he is Isabel's murderer.

Wolfe sends Saul to bring Julie Jaquette. When she dances into Wolfe's office, Miss Jaquette puts on a performance, first singing and then demanding to see Wolfe's orchids. She displays a cynicism regarding human behavior that Wolfe regards as similar to his own. Julie agrees to act as bait for the murderer and is nearly killed herself. For her protection, she is moved into the brownstone, where she helps Wolfe and Archie force Thales' hand. There is no trial, as he commits suicide.

Wolfe offers $50,000 cash for Julie’s assistance, which she uses to attend college. That is half of the fee from Ballou, as his name was not revealed to the police or to newspapers.

== The unfamiliar word ==
"Like all of us, Wolfe has his favorite words, phrases, and sayings," wrote William S. Baring-Gould. "Among the words, many are unusual and some are abstruse."

Nero Wolfe's erudite vocabulary is one of the hallmarks of the character. Examples of unfamiliar words—or unfamiliar uses of words that some would otherwise consider familiar—are found throughout the corpus. Death of a Doxy contains several examples, including the following:

- "Incumbency". Chapter 7; perhaps unfamiliar in the sense that Wolfe uses it: "Mr. Cather has worked for me, on occasion, for years, and I am under an incumbency."
- "Strephon". Chapter 7. "Strephon is the lover of Urania in Sir Philip Sidney's Arcadia," wrote Rev. Frederick G. Gotwald in The Nero Wolfe Companion. "It became the conventional name for a lover in literature." Dating to 1580, the character later appears in Jonathan Swift's "Strephon and Chloe" (1731); Happy Arcadia (1872), a one-act musical play with libretto by W. S. Gilbert; and Gilbert and Sullivan's Iolanthe (1882).
- "Juridically". Chapter 13. (This word also appears in adjectival form in The League of Frightened Men and Prisoner's Base.)
- "Chaldean". Chapter 16.

== Cast of characters ==
- Nero Wolfe: The private investigator
- Archie Goodwin: Wolfe's assistant (and the narrator of all Wolfe stories)
- Orrie Cather: An operative frequently in Wolfe's employ, along with Saul Panzer and Fred Durkin. Orrie's activities in this book are very limited, but the plot centers on his dalliance with Isabel Kerr.
- Jill Hardy: An airline attendant, then termed "stewardess", and Orrie's fiancée
- Isabel Kerr: The murder victim, occupant of a plush apartment, of whom a newspaper wrote, "It does not appear that Miss Kerr was employed anywhere or engaged in any regular activity."
- Stella Fleming: Isabel's sister, whose greatest fear is that Isabel's lifestyle will be publicized
- Barry Fleming: Stella's husband, a mathematics professor
- Avery Ballou: A CEO, a devotee of the works of Rudyard Kipling, and the source of Miss Kerr's rent and other living expenses
- Julie Jaquette (stage name of Amy Jackson): A successful nightclub singer and Isabel Kerr's best friend
- Inspector Cramer: Representing Manhattan Homicide

== Reviews and commentary ==
- Jacques Barzun and Wendell Hertig Taylor, A Catalogue of Crime—First-rate Stout done at the age of 80. The tightness of the plot, the wit, and the people are done with sureness and speed, so that the book, though short, gives one the sense of having lived through a long stretch of tense expectation. New roles, too, for Orrie Cather, Cramer, and Wolfe in relation to a murder which they are not asked to investigate. Wolfe gets his $50,000 fee, which one hopes he splits with the author.
- Terry Teachout, "Forty years with Nero Wolfe" (January 12, 2009)—Rex Stout's witty, fast-moving prose hasn't dated a day, while Wolfe himself is one of the enduringly great eccentrics of popular fiction. I've spent the past four decades reading and re-reading Stout's novels for pleasure, and they have yet to lose their savor ... It is to revel in such writing that I return time and again to Stout's books, and in particular to The League of Frightened Men, Some Buried Caesar, The Silent Speaker, Too Many Women, Murder by the Book, Before Midnight, Plot It Yourself, Too Many Clients, The Doorbell Rang, and Death of a Doxy, which are for me the best of all the full-length Wolfe novels.

== Adaptations ==
=== Nero Wolfe (A&E Network) ===
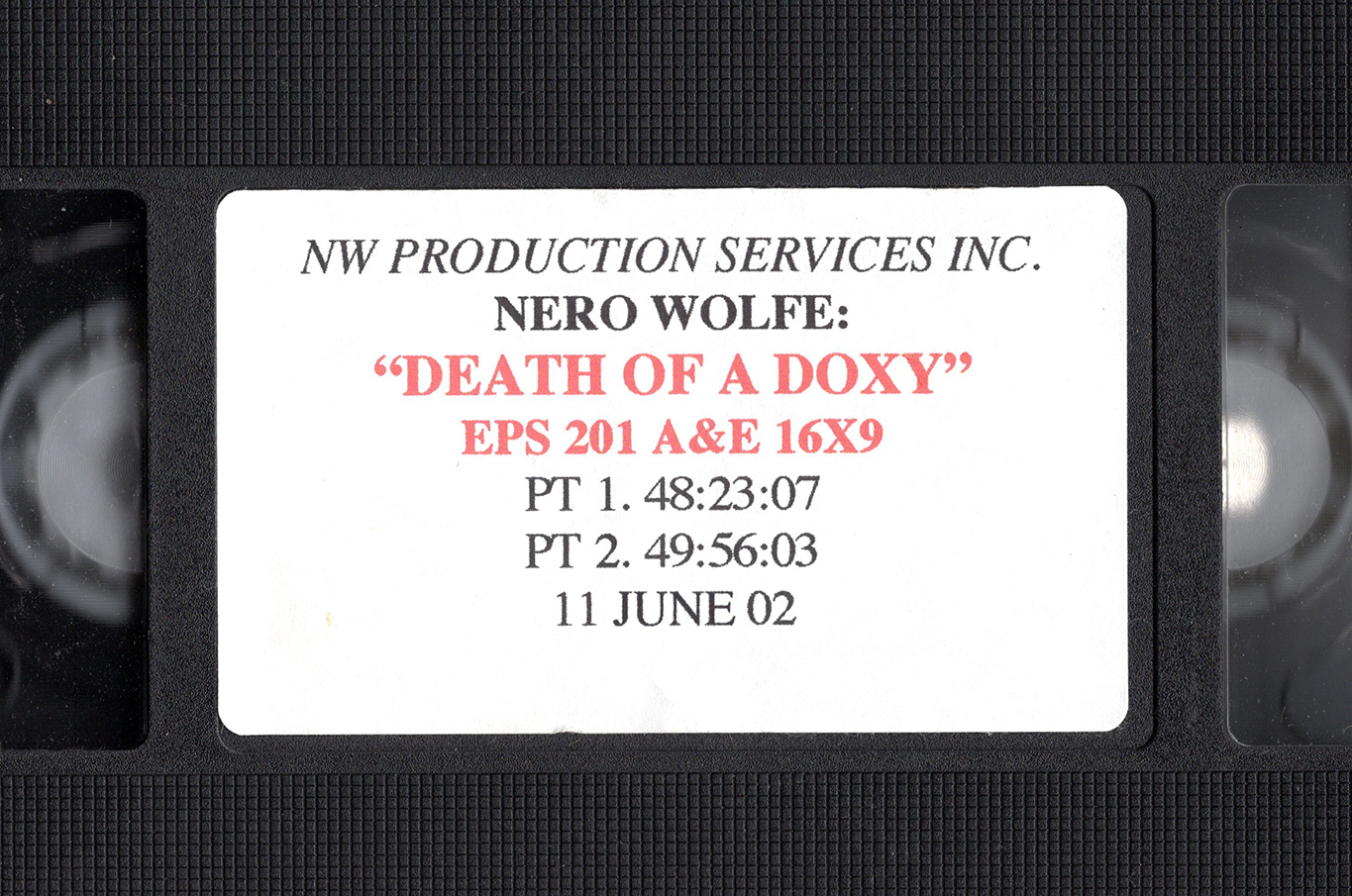
Label on a VHS production tape containing a recording of "Death of a Doxy"—the A&E version in its 16:9 aspect ratio for widescreen viewing

An adaptation of Death of a Doxy opened the second season of the A&E TV series A Nero Wolfe Mystery (2001–2002). Directed by Timothy Hutton from a teleplay by Sharon Elizabeth Doyle, "Death of a Doxy" aired April 14, 2002, on A&E.

Timothy Hutton is Archie Goodwin; Maury Chaykin is Nero Wolfe. Other members of the cast (in credits order) include Colin Fox (Fritz Brenner), Bill Smitrovich (Inspector Cramer), Conrad Dunn (Saul Panzer), Trent McMullen (Orrie Cather), Fulvio Cecere (Fred Durkin), Kari Matchett (Julie Jaquette/Lily Rowan), James Tolkan (Avery Ballou), Christine Brubaker (Stella Fleming), Carlo Rota (Barry Fleming), Nicky Guadagni (Mrs. Ballou), Hayley Verlyn (Isabel Kerr), Janine Theriault (Jill Hardy), George Plimpton (Nathaniel Parker) and Julian Richings (Poet).

In addition to original music by Nero Wolfe composer Michael Small, the soundtrack includes music by Graham de Wilde, (Note: Graham de Wilde, "Private Investigator". KPM Music, KPM 39, Atmospheric Journeys 2 (track 45).) Rick Cassman and Vyv Hope-Scott, (Note: Rick Cassman and Vyv Hope-Scott, "Tristan's Boutique". Carlin Production Music CAR 290, Kitsch – Light and Easy/Cheesy (track 14).) Antonín Dvořák, (Note: Antonín Dvořák, Humoresque in G Flat, Op. 101, No. 7. KPM Music, KPM CS 7, Light Classics Volume One (track 7).) Ken Miller (Note: Ken Miller, "King Swing". 5 Alarm Music, Swing (track 3).) and David Steinberg. (Note: David Steinberg, "Tom Toms Jam". 5 Alarm Music, Swing (track 13).) The series' music producer Richard Martinez and music editor Kevin Banks were nominated for a Golden Reel Award (Best Sound Editing in Television Long Form — Music) for the episode "Death of a Doxy".

In North America, A Nero Wolfe Mystery was released on Region 1 DVD by A&E Home Video (ISBN 076708893X). The DVD release presents the 4:3 pan and scan version of "Death of a Doxy" rather than A&E's 16:9 letterboxed version. (Note: A VHS production tape of "Death of a Doxy" is labelled as follows: NERO WOLFE: "DEATH OF A DOXY" EPS201 A&E 16 X 9 ... 11 JUNE 02)

"Death of a Doxy" is one of the Nero Wolfe episodes released on Region 2 DVD in the Netherlands by Just Entertainment, under license from FremantleMedia Enterprises. A Nero Wolfe Mystery—Serie 2 (2010) was the first DVD release of the international version of the episode, which includes a brief closing scene in which Orrie visits the brownstone. The Netherlands release has optional Dutch subtitles and, like the A&E DVD release, presents the episode in 4:3 pan and scan rather than its 16:9 aspect ratio for widescreen viewing.

Although the second season of Nero Wolfe was produced in high-definition video, none of the several home video releases of the series has been issued in HD.

=== Nero Wolfe (Paramount Television) ===
Death of a Doxy was adapted as "What Happened to April", the ninth episode of Nero Wolfe (1981), an NBC TV series starring William Conrad as Nero Wolfe and Lee Horsley as Archie Goodwin. Other members of the regular cast include George Voskovec (Fritz Brenner), Robert Coote (Theodore Horstmann), George Wyner (Saul Panzer) and Allan Miller (Inspector Cramer). Guest stars include Richard Anderson (Chester Winslow [Avery Ballou]), Deborah Fallender (Julie Keen [Jaquette]) and Laurie Heineman (Donna MacKenzie [Stella Fleming]). Directed by Edward M. Abroms from a teleplay by Stephen Downing, "What Happened to April" aired March 20, 1981.

== Publication history ==
- 1966, New York: The Viking Press, August 19, 1966, hardcover

Bookseller and publisher Otto Penzler describes the first edition of Death of a Doxy: "Yellow boards, gray cloth spine; front cover printed with a blue design; spine printed with blue lettering; rear cover blank. Issued in a red, black, and white dust photographic wrapper which has been die cut to reveal the blue printed design on the front cover. ... The dust wrapper is noteworthy for its ugliness and the singularly misconceived design element of the pointess die cut." In April 2006, Firsts: The Book Collector's Magazine estimated that the first edition of Death of a Doxy had a value of between $100 and $200. The estimate is for a copy in very good to fine condition in a like dustjacket.

- 1966, New York: Viking (Mystery Guild), October 1966, hardcover (Note: The far less valuable Viking book club edition may be distinguished from the first edition in three ways: The dust jacket has "Book Club Edition" printed on the inside front flap, and the price is absent (first editions may be price clipped if they were given as gifts).; Book club editions are sometimes thinner and always taller (usually a quarter of an inch) than first editions.; Book club editions are bound in cardboard, and first editions are bound in cloth (or have at least a cloth spine).)
- 1966, Toronto Star Weekly, abridged, October 1966
- 1966, Toronto: Macmillan, 1966, hardcover
- 1967, London: Collins Crime Club, June 5, 1967, hardcover
- 1967, Argosy, June 1967 (abridged)
- 1967, New York: Bantam #F3476, August 1967, paperback
- 1969, London: Fontana, 1969, paperback
- 1995, New York: Bantam Crime Line ISBN 0-553-27606-9 October 1995, paperback, Rex Stout Library edition with introduction by Sandra West Prowell
- 2002, Auburn, California: The Audio Partners Publishing Corp., Mystery Masters ISBN 1-57270-269-9 July 2002, audio cassette (unabridged, read by Michael Prichard)
- 2010, New York: Bantam Crimeline ISBN 978-0-307-75586-5 July 21, 2010, e-book
