= Please Pass the Guilt =

1973 detective novel by Rex Stout

- Author: Rex Stout
- Cover artist: Abner Graboff
- Language: English
- Series: Nero Wolfe
- Genre: Detective fiction
- Publisher: Viking Press
- Publication date: September 1973
- Publication place: United States
- Media type: Print (Hardcover)
- Pages: 150 pp. (first edition)
- ISBN: 0-670-55994-6
- OCLC: 729130
- Dewey Decimal: 813/.5/2
- LC Class: PZ3.S8894 Pj PS3537.T733
- Preceded by: Death of a Dude
- Followed by: A Family Affair

Please Pass the Guilt is a Nero Wolfe detective novel by Rex Stout, published by the Viking Press in 1973. Unusually for a Nero Wolfe story, which mostly take place very near the time of publication, this novel is set in 1969, though it was originally published in 1973.

== Plot introduction ==
Wolfe picked up the check and held it out. "Take it. You have wasted your time and mine. You want a miracle, and miracles are not in my repertory. Give me the receipt."
"My god," she said, "you are highhanded. What can they tell you?"
"I don't know, and I need to know. If there is a fact that will help me to do what you want done, I want it. If you think that I may inadvertently disclose what you have told me, even a hint of it, if you think me capable of such ineptitude, you were a ninny to come to me at all."

— Nero Wolfe with client Madeline Odell, chapter 5

As a favor to Dr. Edwin Vollmer, Wolfe agrees to find information about a case from Vollmer's friend's crisis intervention center. A man with the alias "Ronald Seaver" has attended the clinic, given no information, but spoken of having blood on his hands no one can see. Through trickery, Wolfe and Goodwin learn that this man is actually Kenneth Meer, an employee at the CAN broadcast network. An executive at the network, Peter Odell, has been killed in a bomb attack. Odell's widow believes that one of his rivals murdered him, and hires Wolfe to find proof.

== Characters ==
- Archie Goodwin - Confidential secretary to Nero Wolfe
- Saul Panzer, Fred Durkin, and Orrie Cather - Private investigators hired by Wolfe to help on the case
- Cass R. Abbot - President on CAN
- Peter J. Odell - Vice President in charge of development; killed by a bomb.
- Madeline Odell - Surviving wife of Peter Odell.
- Charlotte Haber - Secretary to Mrs. Odell
- Amory Browning - Vice President in charge of programming.
- Helen Lugos - Browning's secretary
- Kenneth Meer - Browning's chief assistant
- Theodore Falk - Wall Street Lawyer
- Sylvia Venner - CAN employee
- James Farquhar - Banker and yacht owner
- Dennis Copes - CAN employee who may have wanted Meer's job
- Inspector Cramer - NYPD homicide
- Lieutenant Rowcliff - NYPD homicide
- Nasir ibn Bekr - Possible mid-east terrorist

== Note ==
In chapter two we learn that Wolfe has hired a team of three people from Midtown Home Service Corporation to help Fritz clean the brownstone. Andy and Sam bring along Lucile. Wolfe is mildly upset when he learns that a woman has come to help clean his house.

== Publication history ==
- 1973, New York: The Viking Press, September 1973, hardcover

In his limited-edition pamphlet, Collecting Mystery Fiction #10, Rex Stout's Nero Wolfe Part II, Otto Penzler describes the first edition of Please Pass the Guilt: "Black boards, red cloth spine; front and rear covers blank; spine stamped with gold. Issued in a mainly black and brown pictorial dust wrapper."
In April 2006, Firsts: The Book Collector's Magazine estimated that the first edition of Please Pass the Guilt had a value of between $60 and $100. The estimate is for a copy in very good to fine condition in a like dustjacket.

- 1973, New York: Viking (Mystery Guild), November 1973, hardcover

The far less valuable Viking book club edition may be distinguished from the first edition in three ways:

- The dust jacket has "Book Club Edition" printed on the inside front flap, and the price is absent (first editions may be price clipped if they were given as gifts).
- Book club editions are sometimes thinner and always taller (usually a quarter of an inch) than first editions.
- Book club editions are bound in cardboard, and first editions are bound in cloth (or have at least a cloth spine).

- 1974, New York: Bantam #Q-8472, October 1974, paperback
- 1974, London: Collins Crime Club, 1974, hardcover
- 1974, London: Book Club Associates, 1972
- 1975, Glasgow: Fontana #3668, 1975, paperback
- 1995, New York: Bantam Books ISBN 0-553-76308-3 January 2, 1995, paperback
- 1999, Newport Beach, California: Books on Tape, Inc. ISBN 0-7366-4456-3 March 8, 1999, audio cassette (unabridged, read by Michael Prichard)
- 2010, New York: Bantam ISBN 978-0-307-75610-7 July 21, 2010, e-book

== The unfamiliar word ==
"Nero Wolfe talks in a way that no human being on the face of the earth has ever spoken, with the possible exception of Rex Stout after he had a gin and tonic," said Michael Jaffe, executive producer of the A&E TV series, A Nero Wolfe Mystery. "Readers of the Wolfe saga often have to turn to the dictionary because of the erudite vocabulary of Wolfe and sometimes of Archie," wrote Rev. Frederick G. Gotwald.

Nero Wolfe's vocabulary is one of the hallmarks of the character. Examples of unfamiliar words — or unfamiliar uses of words that some would otherwise consider familiar — are found throughout the corpus, often in the give-and-take between Wolfe and Archie.

- Amphigoric, chapter 12.
- Subreption, chapter 18.
- Cynosure, chapter 18.
- Concupiscence, chapter 19.
