= Red Threads =

1939 novel by Rex Stout

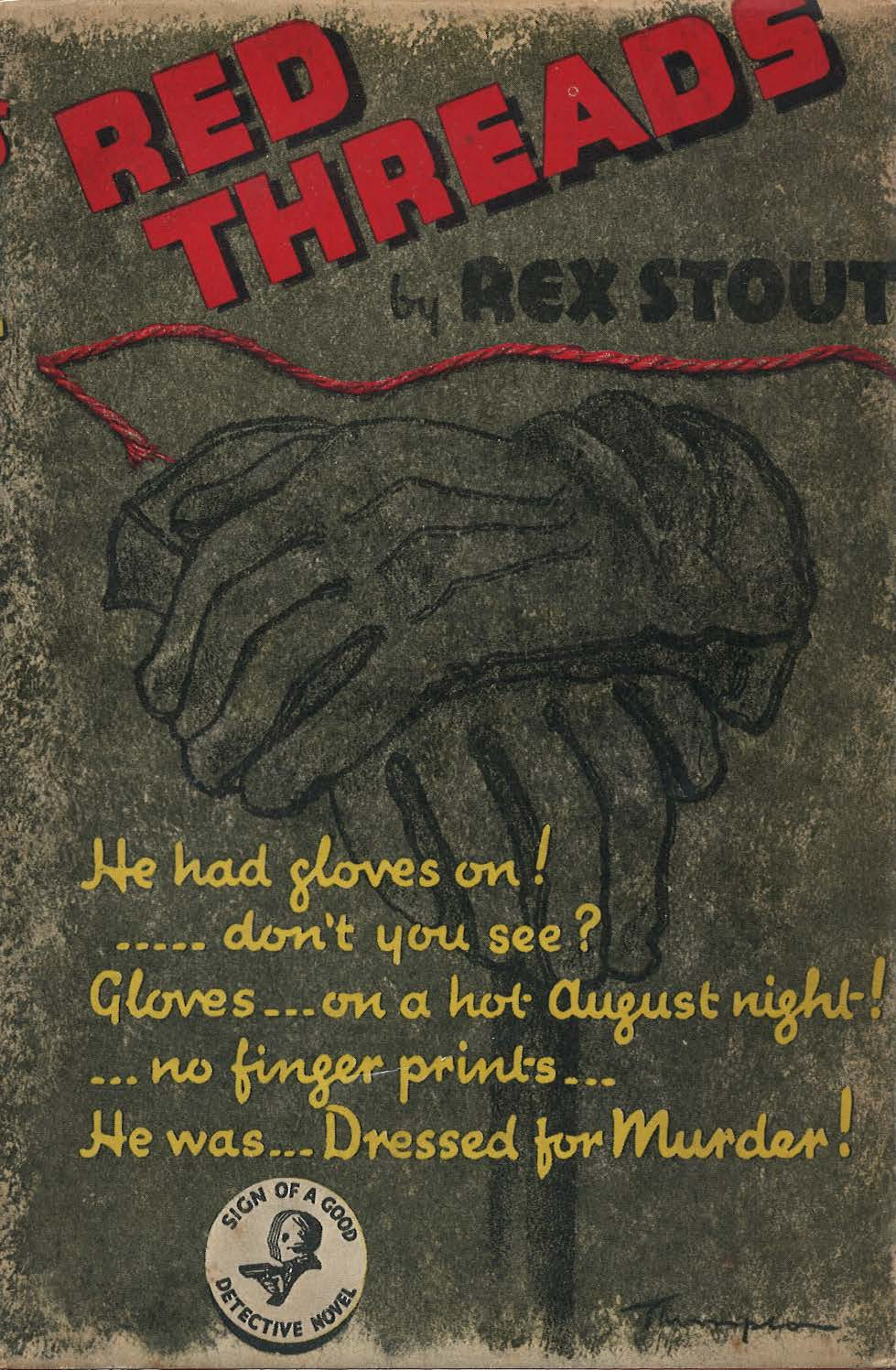
- Author: Rex Stout
- Language: English
- Series: Inspector Cramer
- Genre: Detective
- Publisher: Farrar & Rinehart (U.S. 1939); Collins Crime Club (U.K. 1941)
- Publication date: December 1, 1939
- Publication place: United States
- Media type: Print; hardcover and paperback
- Preceded by: Over My Dead Body
- Followed by: Where There's a Will

Red Threads is a mystery novel by American writer Rex Stout, starring his detective Inspector Cramer, first published in 1939. Police Inspector Cramer was the protagonist of one mystery written by Stout in 1939.

== Plot summary ==
Inspector Cramer, working on a case in which Nero Wolfe plays no part, shows his competence as a sleuth. The victim is Val Carew, an Oklahoma gambler turned tycoon, who has built a sumptuous mausoleum for his dead wife, a Cherokee princess, and is struck down there with an Indian war club, then scalped. Although this murder is wrapped in a skein of red threads binding it to the textile industry, Cramer is equal to the challenge.

== Literary significance and criticism ==
- Maurice Willson Disher, Times Literary Supplement — Further evidence is provided by Mr. Rex Stout of the new fashion in Red Indians. His hero, like many Americans in real life, boasts of a strain of native blood. His heroine boasts of a strain of native yarn in the cloth she is wearing. The story, like another recently brought over from the United States, ingeniously uses Red Indian relics as "properties". The threads that give the book its title excite a lively hue and cry, complicated by a curious case of robbery by force which keeps us guessing not only to the last page but for hours or days after. No one need be unduly puzzled over the murder, but even Mr. Stout himself must feel perplexed when he tries to understand the murderer's motive for such a very curious and alarming robbery.
- Jacques Barzun and Wendell Hertig Taylor, A Catalogue of Crime — An example of non-Wolfe work, but with Insp. Cramer rather Wolfishly in charge. It is far better than The Hand in the Glove and not nearly so good as Bad for Business, while sharing important elements with each—e.g., a straining for the fantastic and the wildly feminine and a marked ability for handling crowds, institutions, and businesses. But the killing and detecting against a background of hand-weaving and American Indian attitudes are negligible.
- Ralph Partridge, New Statesman — A Rex Stout without Nero Wolfe is always a pleasure and a relief, because he seems to write better without the obligation to wisecrack in every sentence. Red Threads, however, is hardly detection. An eccentric millionaire is murdered in the mausoleum he has erected to his Cherokee Indian wife, and a Cherokee Indian grunts his way through the book, but the plot is just high-spirited, romantic nonsense that anyone can enjoy, barring the Indian love lyrics.
- Isaac Anderson, The New York Times Book Review — Here is a Christmas package of five mystery stories, none of which has previously appeared in book form. The longest of the lot is a full-length novel. "Red Threads" by Rex Stout. Neither Nero Wolfe nor Tecumseh Fox appears in it, and neither will be missed. The detective is a hard-boiled, conscientious cop of the New York Homicide Squad. His job is to get evidence and he goes at it without fear or favor, but he is not hard in the sense that he merely wants to get a conviction. When he is wrong he is willing to admit it, but to convince him he is wrong takes some doing, as Jean Harris discovers. You will like and respect Inspector Cramer, and you will be glad he is not on your trail if you have run afoul of the law.

== Publication history ==
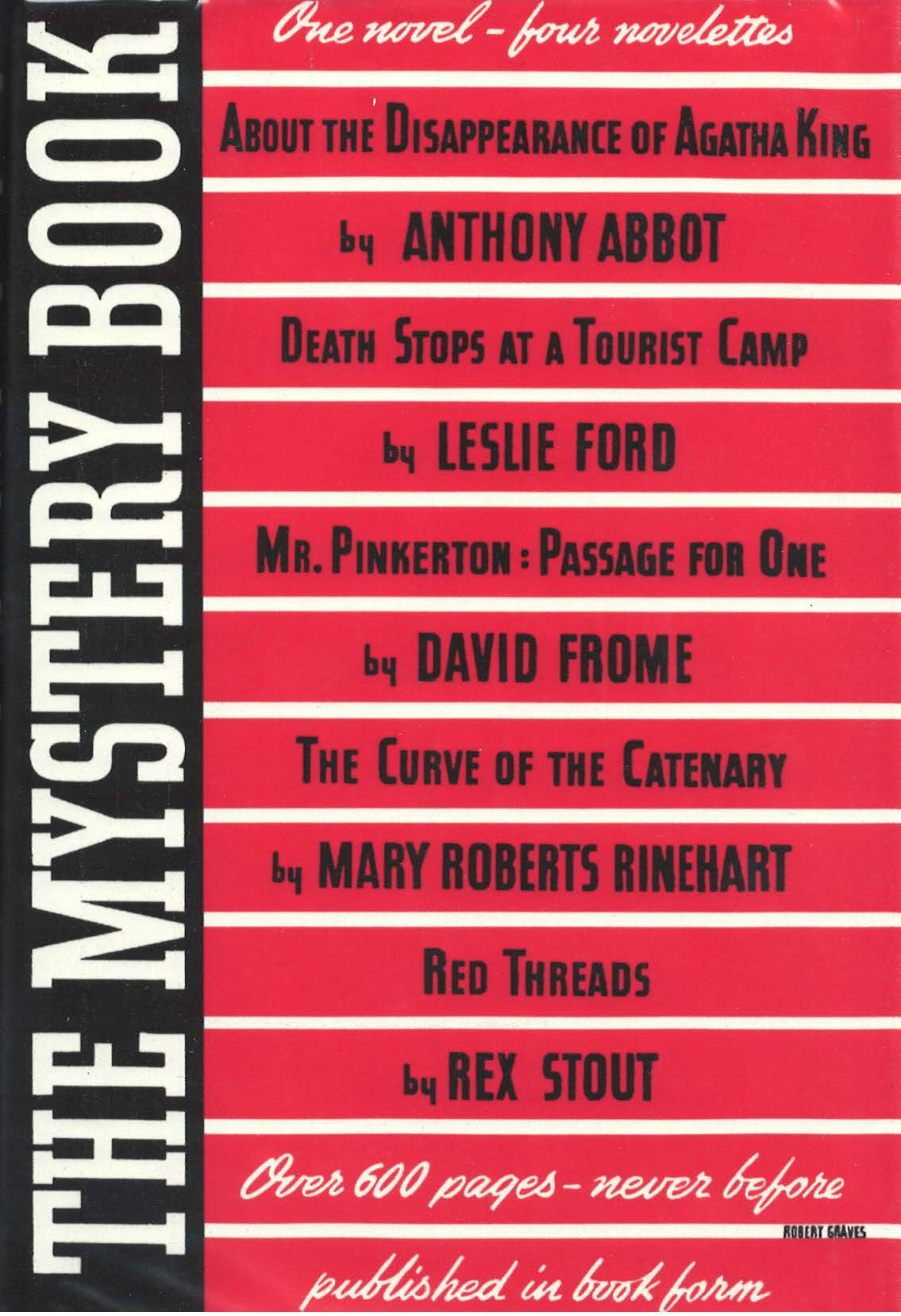
Red Threads first appeared in the 1939 anthology, The Mystery Book

- 1939, The Mystery Book, an anthology. New York: Farrar & Rinehart, December 1, 1939, hardcover
- 1941, London: Collins Crime Club, July 14, 1941, hardcover
- 1948, New York: Dell #235 (mapback ), paperback
- 1954, London: Penguin #976, paperback
- 1964, New York: Pyramid (Green Door) #R-1098, November 1964; second printing #R1373, July 1967; )third printing #X-1936, January 1969, paperback
