= The Silent Speaker =

1946 Nero Wolfe detective novel by Rex Stout

- Author: Rex Stout
- Cover artist: Robert Hallock
- Language: English
- Series: Nero Wolfe
- Genre: Detective fiction
- Publisher: Viking Press
- Publication date: October 21, 1946
- Publication place: United States
- Media type: Print (Hardcover)
- Pages: 308 pp. (first edition)
- OCLC: 1473383
- Preceded by: Not Quite Dead Enough
- Followed by: Too Many Women

The Silent Speaker is a Nero Wolfe detective novel by Rex Stout, first published by the Viking Press in 1946. It was published just after World War II, and key plot elements reflect the lingering effects of the war: housing shortages and restrictions on consumer goods, including government regulation of prices, featuring the conflict between a federal price regulatory body and a national business association, paralleling the conflicts between the Office of Price Administration and the U.S. Chamber of Commerce and the National Association of Manufacturers.

The Silent Speaker was Stout's first full-length Nero Wolfe novel since Where There's a Will in 1940. "Thereafter, though he would continue writing for another thirty years, his stories would all be Nero Wolfe stories," wrote biographer John McAleer. "He liked Wolfe and Archie. After all, they were an essential part of himself. 'During the war years I missed them,' he told me."

== Plot introduction ==
Wolfe sighed. "You're missing the whole point. What has been the outstanding fact about this case for a whole week now? What was its peculiar characteristic? This, that the public, the people, had immediately brought the case to trial as usual, without even waiting for an arrest, and instead of the customary prolonged disagreement and dissension regarding various suspects, they reached an immediate verdict. Almost unanimously they convicted – this was the peculiar fact – not an individual, but an organization. The verdict was that the National Industrial Association had murdered Cheney Boone."

— Nero Wolfe, clarifying matters for the District Attorney, in The Silent Speaker, chapter 29.

The head of a Federal agency is bludgeoned to death just before giving a speech to an industrial association. Public opinion quickly turns against the association, which is thought to have been involved in the murder. The association hires Wolfe to find the murderer in hope of ending the public relations disaster.

== Plot summary ==
Cheney Boone, the Director of the Bureau of Price Regulation (BPR) is beaten to death with a monkey wrench shortly before a speech he is to deliver at a gathering of the National Industrial Association (NIA), a prominent conglomeration of big business interests. Considerable antagonism exists between the two parties, and the public begins to hold the NIA responsible for Boone's murder. This attracts the attention of Nero Wolfe, who is facing financial ruin, and with the help of Archie Goodwin he launches a scheme to manipulate the NIA into hiring his services to find the killer.

Wolfe arranges a meeting between the principal witnesses to the case—Boone's widow and niece, acting BPR director Solomon Dexter and researcher Alger Kates, the NIA executive committee, and select members of law-enforcement including Inspector Cramer and Sgt. Purley Stebbins. The meeting soon degenerates into chaos and bickering, but Wolfe is intrigued by the absence of Phoebe Gunther, Boone's private secretary and the last person to see him alive, and orders Archie to bring her to him for questioning. Archie finds Phoebe at an apartment owned and occupied by Alger Kates and, after a flirtatious battle of wits, persuades her to meet Wolfe. Phoebe claims that she was given a leather case full of confidential dictation cylinders shortly before Boone's death, but has misplaced them.

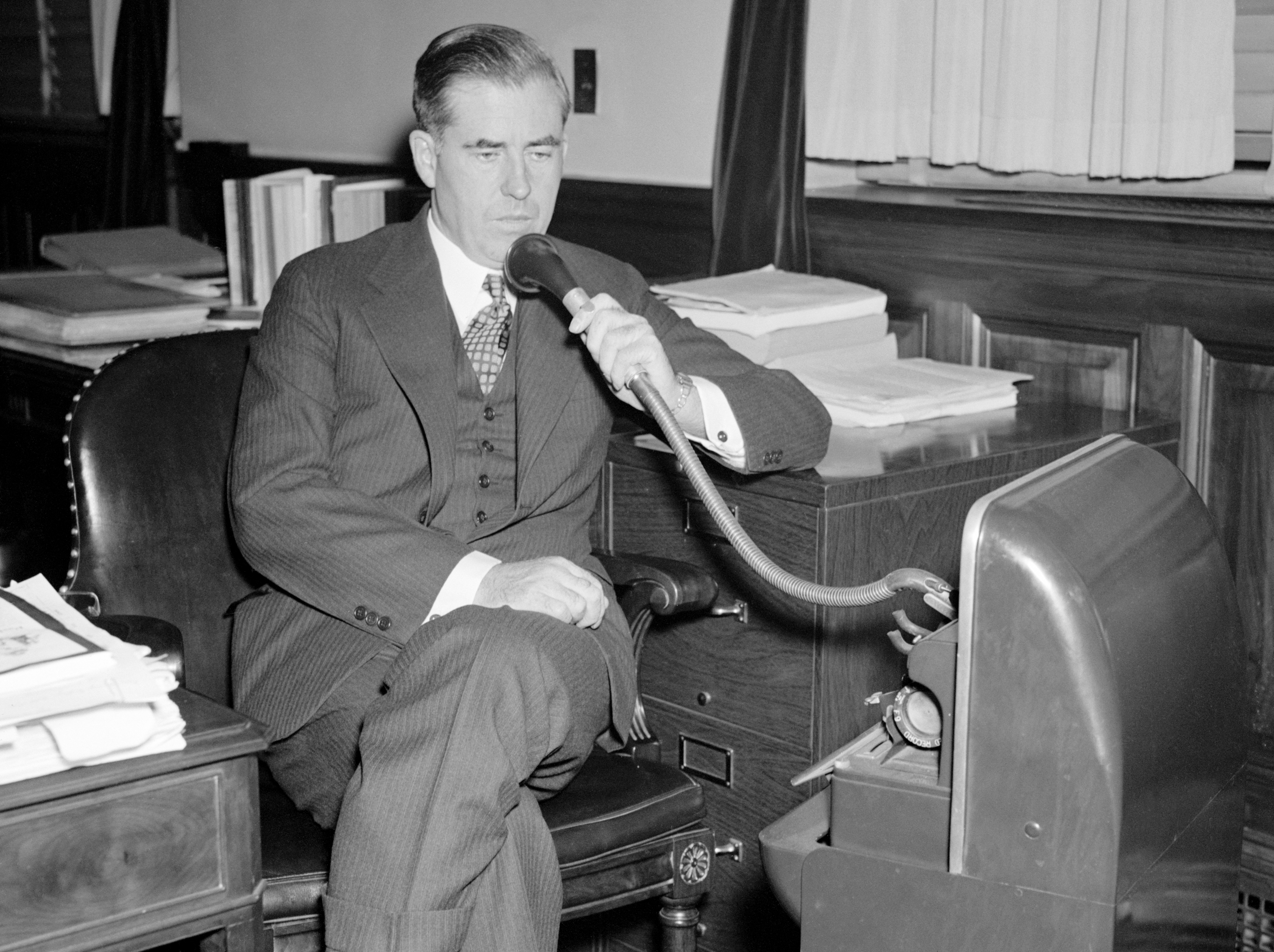
Dictaphone machine being used by U.S. Secretary of Agriculture Henry A. Wallace

The next day, Wolfe receives a telegram informing him that surveillance of Don O’Neill, the chairman of the NIA's dinner committee, will have to be suspended—surveillance that neither he nor Archie ordered. Archie therefore follows O’Neill to Grand Central Station, where O’Neill retrieves the leather case from the parcel room, and intercepts him. Faced with the choice of going to the police or to Wolfe, O’Neill is forced to surrender the case, which contains ten dictation cylinders. It becomes clear when listening to them that none of them are the real confidential cylinders, however. When Wolfe calls another meeting of the principal witnesses, Phoebe once again fails to appear—but this time, her body is discovered by the front step of Wolfe's home, brutally bludgeoned with a length of rusty pipe.

It is clear that Phoebe's murderer is one of the principal witnesses, and that this person is likely to have also murdered Boone. After nine of the ten cylinders are discovered in Phoebe's apartment, both Wolfe and Inspector Cramer become convinced that the missing cylinder is key to the murder, but political pressure forces Cramer's superiors to replace him with Inspector Ash. Ash issues a warrant for Wolfe and Archie and tries to bully information out of Wolfe, leading to a violent confrontation in the police commissioner's office. Although Wolfe stubbornly refuses to assist Ash, once the warrants are vacated he reveals why the cylinder is so important—on it, Boone identifies his own murderer. Phoebe, a passionate BPR supporter, intended to reveal it once the NIA had been damaged as much as possible by the controversy over Boone's death, but managed to alert the murderer that she was aware of his identity and was killed for her silence.

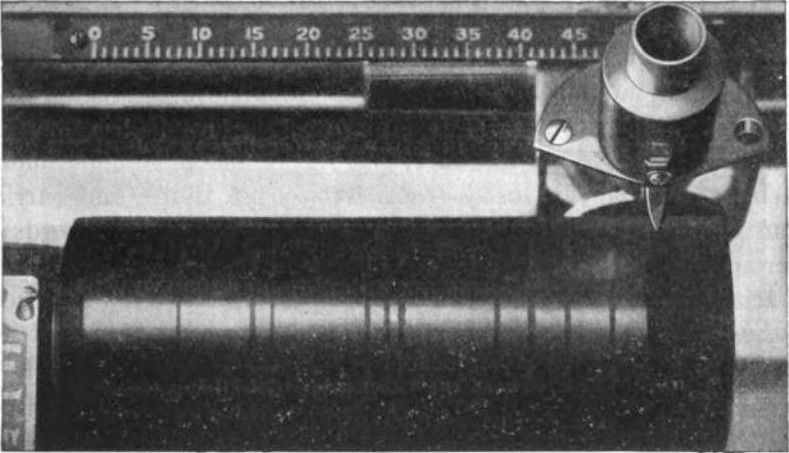
Cylinder on Dictaphone dictation machine

After a meeting with Boone's widow, where she confirms that Phoebe did indeed possess the cylinders, Wolfe takes the unprecedented step of terminating his contract with the NIA and returning the group's $30,000 fee. As this removes the protection he has received through the status of his clients and will begin a barrage of police and media interest in him, he fakes a mental breakdown in order to hold the police off and buy time until the cylinder is found. Before the police can expose his deception, Wolfe realises that the only place Phoebe could have hidden the cylinder and known it was safe was Wolfe's own office. He thus has Archie, Fritz and Theodore search the room for the cylinder, where it is found concealed in a bookcase. When played, both Wolfe and Cramer are vindicated; the murderer is revealed to be Alger Kates, who was bribed by Don O'Neill to pass on confidential BPR information and was exposed on the cylinder as a traitor. Having heard the cylinder, Phoebe discovered his guilt but revealed her knowledge to Kates when after pressuring him to return numerous items, possessing sentimental value to Boone's widow, that were stolen from the corpse to fake a theft.

The novel ends with Archie confronting Wolfe, having realized that Wolfe staged the cylinder's discovery and in fact knew it was in his office the whole time. He is simply unsure of whether Wolfe waited so long for "art's sake," or simply to ensure that he could collect a $100,000 reward offered by the NIA instead of the $30,000 fee. Wolfe does not disagree with either hypothesis, but suggests another motivation: having come to respect Phoebe Gunther's intelligence and determination, Wolfe decided to continue as far as possible her objective of causing damage to the NIA. In gratitude for saving his career, Inspector Cramer timidly gives Wolfe an orchid for a gift.

== The unfamiliar word ==
In most Nero Wolfe novels and novellas, there is an unfamiliar word, usually spoken by Wolfe. The Silent Speaker contains just this one:

- Gammer. Chapter 29.

== Cast of characters ==
- Nero Wolfe – The private investigator
- Archie Goodwin – Wolfe's assistant (and the narrator of all Wolfe stories)
- Doctor Vollmer – Wolfe's neighbor and practitioner of choice when medical treatment is needed

For the BPR:

- Cheney Boone – Director of the BPR (compare to the real-life Chester Bowles, head of the OPA from 1943 to 1946)
- Solomon Dexter – Acting Director of the BPR following Cheney Boone's death
- Phoebe Gunther – Boone's confidential secretary, and second in command at the BPR in all but title
- Alger Kates – A researcher for the BPR
- Mrs. Cheney Boone – Widow of the murdered BPR director
- Nina Boone – Boone's niece

For the NIA:

- Frank and Edward Erskine – Father and son members of the NIA's Executive Committee
- Messrs. Breslow and Winterhoff – Other members of the Executive Committee
- Don O'Neill – Chairman of the dinner committee for the NIA event at which Boone was murdered
- Hattie Harding – Assistant Director of Public Relations

For New York law enforcement:

- Inspector Ash, Inspector Cramer, Sergeant Purley Stebbins, Commissioner Hombert and District Attorney Skinner

== Sentiment ==
The reader is given the opportunity to see how much Wolfe's attitude toward sentiment changes over a brief span of time. In The Silent Speaker, he tells Archie, "One of your most serious defects is that you have no sentiment." Only two years later, in And Be a Villain, he tells Archie, "You would sentimentalize the multiplication table."

== Reviews and commentary ==
- Isaac Anderson, The New York Times Book Review (October 27, 1946) – In this new Nero Wolfe story we are introduced to two organizations whose feelings toward each other are somewhat less than tepid. The NIA, composed of tycoons of high and low degree, is dedicated to the preservation of the American Way of Life. The BPR, a Government bureau, is believed by NIA to have for its chief purpose the throttling of Free Enterprise – which, as everybody knows, is just another name for the aforesaid A. W. of L. The chairman of BPR is fatally conked with a monkey wrench just before he was to have addressed a meeting of NIA – and there are those who believe that NIA has resorted to murder when other attempts to curb BPR have failed. Such a case as this is right up Nero Wolfe's alley. He even neglects his beloved orchids for three whole days. Whether he also neglects his beer deponent sayeth not. It is a humdinger of a story with Nero Wolfe and Archie Goodwin at their uproarious best.
- Jacques Barzun and Wendell Hertig Taylor, A Catalogue of Crime – The least likely suspect is well hidden, Wolfe does some thinking, and Archie is Archie. Not too much wrangling with the police, and in truth one of Rex Stout's best in the semi-demi form.
- Saturday Review of Literature (November 9, 1946) – Head of government price regulating bureau monkey-wrenched out of life just before industrialists' banquet. Enter much-missed Nero Wolfe. Slightly subdued Archie Goodwin narrates Nero's adventures with inimical groups; which include second murder, sharp-edged satire, and Dupinesque solution. Welcome home, Nero.
- Terry Teachout, "Forty years with Nero Wolfe" (January 12, 2009) – Rex Stout's witty, fast-moving prose hasn't dated a day, while Wolfe himself is one of the enduringly great eccentrics of popular fiction. I've spent the past four decades reading and re-reading Stout's novels for pleasure, and they have yet to lose their savor ... It is to revel in such writing that I return time and again to Stout's books, and in particular to The League of Frightened Men, Some Buried Caesar, The Silent Speaker, Too Many Women, Murder by the Book, Before Midnight, Plot It Yourself, Too Many Clients, The Doorbell Rang, and Death of a Doxy, which are for me the best of all the full-length Wolfe novels.
- J. Kenneth Van Dover, At Wolfe's Door – Wolfe's return to the novel-length mystery is a strong one: the plot is solid and the characters – especially Phoebe Gunther – are interesting. There are also strong ideological implications to the action. Miss Gunther refers to the capitalists of the NIA as "the dirtiest gang of pigs and chiselers on earth." Solomon Dexter calls them "the dirtiest bunch of liars and cutthroats in existence." Archie and Wolfe evidently share this estimation. Wolfe deliberately prolongs the public rancor against the NIA until events force him to disclose the criminal and to accept the NIA's gratitude and money.

== Adaptations ==
=== Nero Wolfe (A&E Network) ===
The Silent Speaker was adapted for the second season of the A&E TV series A Nero Wolfe Mystery (2001–2002). It is the only episode to be both written and directed by Nero Wolfe executive producer Michael Jaffe. "The Silent Speaker" made its debut in two one-hour episodes airing July 14 and 21, 2002, on A&E.

Timothy Hutton is Archie Goodwin; Maury Chaykin is Nero Wolfe. Other members of the cast (in credits order) are Debra Monk (Mrs. Boone), Colin Fox (Fritz Brenner), Bill Smitrovich (Inspector Cramer), Cynthia Watros (Phoebe Gunther), Joe Flaherty (Dr. Vollmer), George Plimpton (Winterhoff), James Tolkan (FBI Agent Richard Wragg), Conrad Dunn (Saul Panzer), Fulvio Cecere (Fred Durkin), David Schurmann (Frank Erskine), Christine Brubaker (Hattie Harding), Bill MacDonald (Breslow), Matthew Edison (Edward Erskine), R.D. Reid (Sergeant Purley Stebbins), Nicky Guadagni (Mrs. Cramer/Secretary), Richard Waugh (Don O'Neill), Manon von Gerkan (Nina Boone), Julian Richings (Alger Kates), Robert Bockstael (Solomon Dexter), Gary Reineke (Hombert), Steve Cumyn (Skinner).

In addition to original music by Nero Wolfe composer Michael Small, the soundtrack includes music by Anton Rubinstein (titles) and Dick Walter.

A Nero Wolfe Mystery is available on DVD from A&E Home Video (ISBN 076708893X). The bonus 16:9 letterbox version of "The Silent Speaker" is the only episode of Nero Wolfe that A&E Home Video has made available in widescreen format. "The Silent Speaker" is one of three telefilms initially aired in two parts that A&E released as a "double episode" with a single set of titles and credits.

== Publication history ==
The first edition of The Silent Speaker marks the change from Stout's previous publisher, Farrar & Rinehart, to The Viking Press, which would remain his (first edition) publisher for the remainder of his writing career.

- 1946, New York: The Viking Press, October 21, 1946, hardcover

In his limited-edition pamphlet, Collecting Mystery Fiction #9, Rex Stout's Nero Wolfe Part I, Otto Penzler describes the first edition of The Silent Speaker: "Green cloth, front cover and spine printed with yellow lettering and red rules; rear cover blank. Issued in a mainly green and yellow pictorial dust wrapper."
In April 2006, Firsts: The Book Collector's Magazine estimated that the first edition of The Silent Speaker had a value of between $400 and $750. The estimate is for a copy in very good to fine condition in a like dustjacket.

- 1946, New York: Armed Services Edition #1222, February 1946, paperback
- 1946, Toronto: Macmillan, 1946, hardcover
- 1946, New York: Detective Book Club #55, December 1946, hardcover
- 1947, London: Collins Crime Club, March 10, 1947, hardcover
- 1948, New York: Bantam #308, October 1948, paperback
- London: Collins (White Circle) #215c, not dated, paperback
- 1956, London: Fontana #150, 1956, paperback
- 1958, New York: Bantam #A1797, 1956, paperback
- 1967, New York, Bantam F3477, second printing August 1967, paperback
- 1976, New York, Bantam 10067-X, ninth printing December 1976, paperback
- 1983, New York: Bantam Crimeline ISBN 0-553-23497-8 September 1983, second edition, ninth printing, paperback
- 1994, New York: Bantam Crimeline ISBN 0-553-23497-8 February 1994, paperback, Rex Stout Library edition with introduction by Walter Mosley
- 2002, Auburn, California: The Audio Partners Publishing Corp., Mystery Masters ISBN 1-57270-270-2 May 2002, audio cassette (unabridged, read by Michael Prichard)
- 2009, New York: Bantam Dell Publishing Group (with Black Orchids) ISBN 978-0-553-38655-4 August 25, 2009, trade paperback
- 2011, New York: Bantam Crimeline ISBN 978-0-307-78389-9 February 16, 2011, e-book
