= Nero Wolfe (1981 TV series) =

1981 American television show

- William Conrad as Nero Wolfe
- Genre: Drama
- Starring: William Conrad; Lee Horsley; George Voskovec; Robert Coote; George Wyner; Allan Miller
- Composer: John Addison
- Country of origin: United States
- Original language: English
- No. of seasons: 1
- No. of episodes: 14

Production
- Executive producers: Ivan Goff; Ben Roberts
- Running time: 60 minutes
- Production company: Paramount Television

Original release
- Network: NBC
- Release: January 16 – June 2, 1981

Related
- Nero Wolfe; A Nero Wolfe Mystery

Nero Wolfe is an American drama television series based on the characters in Rex Stout's series of detective stories. The series aired on NBC from January 16 to August 25, 1981. William Conrad fills the role of the detective genius Nero Wolfe, and Lee Horsley is his assistant Archie Goodwin. Produced by Paramount Television, the series updates the world of Nero Wolfe to contemporary New York City and draws few of its stories from the Stout originals.

== Plot ==
Nero Wolfe (William Conrad) enjoys a life of refined self-indulgence in his comfortable Manhattan brownstone — reading, dining, spending regular hours in his rooftop plant rooms, and only reluctantly involving himself in the detection of crime. Famously sedentary, Wolfe relies on his legman Archie Goodwin (Lee Horsley) to collect the clues and the suspects in any case at hand, while he spars with his live-in chef Fritz Brenner (George Voskovec) and bickers with his resident orchid nurse Theodore Horstmann (Robert Coote, in his final role). Often assisted by freelance detective Saul Panzer (George Wyner), Wolfe and Archie customarily gather the suspects in Wolfe's office and present the solution to the exasperated Inspector Cramer (Allan Miller) of Manhattan Homicide.

== Production ==
In March 1980, Nero Wolfe was one of half-a-dozen new series being considered by the team of Brandon Tartikoff and Fred Silverman at NBC, according to Peter Boyer of the Associated Press. "The idea has been tried unsuccessfully on TV before, most recently by ABC," Boyer reported. "But NBC has an angle going that will certainly make this Nero Wolfe worthy of notice — the distinct possibility that Orson Welles will play the lead role." The pilot episode was to be written by Leon Tokatyan (Lou Grant).

When filming of the TV series was under way later that year, columnist Marilyn Beck wrote that Nero Wolfe had been planned as a starring vehicle for Welles until he decided that he wanted NBC to change the concept from a one-hour weekly series to a series of 90-minute specials, and that he wanted his scenes filmed at his Los Angeles home. Some 20 years later, in a story about the A&E Nero Wolfe series, the Toronto Star reported that Welles had bowed out of the NBC series because he was unable to learn the dialogue. Other reports had it that Welles had refused to work with Paramount's producers, who wanted to "make Nero Wolfe more human." Welles and Paramount had already had creative differences over the Rex Stout adaptations; Paramount had purchased the entire set of Nero Wolfe stories for Welles in 1976, but in 1977 Welles had bowed out of Paramount's first effort to bring Nero Wolfe to television, in an ABC-TV movie.

On June 30, 1980, the Associated Press reported that William Conrad would play the title role in NBC's Nero Wolfe.

"I've loved the novels for 25 years," Conrad said. "And I love his life-style. I don't have to run any more. My poor feet are still aching from all the running I had to do in Cannon."

In December 1980, NBC announced that Nero Wolfe would begin airing in January 1981, as "an ideal alternative to the competition in this time period" — The Dukes of Hazzard. The Dukes of Hazzard was then ranked number 2 in the Nielsen ratings.

"American Nero Wolfe fans had their dreams come true in 1981, when the NBC network allowed viewers on a weekly, prime time visit to the infamous [sic] New York brownstone on West 35th Street," wrote Brian Sheridan in the Spring 2008 issue of The Gazette: The Journal of the Wolfe Pack. Sheridan interviewed Lee Horsley, who found his first major role when he was cast as Archie Goodwin. Horsley recalled an enjoyable relationship with William Conrad, whose off-screen demeanor was a perfect fit for the character. "He was definitely Nero Wolfe down to the toes," Horsley said.

"I remember the days when he would shoot the final scene (of an episode) when Wolfe called all the suspects together," says Horsley. "Bill (Conrad) had in his contract that he would only work so many hours a day. If the clock struck whatever, and it was time for him to go, he'd put on his bedroom slippers and he was gone. It didn’t matter if we were in the middle of a scene or not. He loved the work but he was that way. When he decided he didn’t want to play anymore, that was it. We'd have to figure it out how to shoot the rest of the scene just to get it done."

Horsley spoke of his love for Rex Stout's books and characters, and credited the care taken with the production's art direction, set design and wardrobe in creating the atmosphere of the stories. "It was so great to go into work," he said.

The sets for Nero Wolfe were designed by John Beckman, whose credits include Casablanca, Lost Horizon and The Maltese Falcon. The plant rooms were stocked by Zuma Canyon Orchids of Malibu, California, which on the eve of the series registered the hybrid Phalaenopsis Nero Wolfe with the Royal Horticultural Society.

== Cast ==
Lee Horsley and William Conrad

- William Conrad as Nero Wolfe
- Lee Horsley as Archie Goodwin
- George Voskovec as Fritz Brenner
- Robert Coote as Theodore Horstmann
- George Wyner as Saul Panzer
- Allan Miller as Inspector Cramer

Guest stars included Richard Anderson, Ramon Bieri, Delta Burke, Linden Chiles, Charles Cioffi, Patti Davis, John de Lancie, John Ericson, Mary Frann, David Hedison, Katherine Justice, Robert Loggia (albeit, uncredited), Darren McGavin, Barry Nelson, John Randolph, Russ Tamblyn and Lana Wood.

== Episodes ==
Although the series was titled Rex Stout's Nero Wolfe, the scripts departed considerably from the Stout originals. Only seven of the 14 episodes are credited as being based upon Stout stories. All episodes were set in contemporary New York City.

No.	Title	Directed by	Written by	Original release date
1	"The Golden Spiders"	Michael O'Herlihy	Wallace Ware & Peter Nasco	January 16, 1981
Adapted from Stout's novel The Golden Spiders (1953) - After Archie plays a prank on Wolfe by encouraging a child to hire Wolfe the little boy is run down in the street by the same car he wanted Wolfe to investigate. Featured: Carlene Watkins and Katherine Justice [Note: In the original, the boy is killed, but in this version, he survives the attempt on his life.]
2	"Death on the Doorstep"	George McCowan	Stephen Downing	January 23, 1981
Archie's best friend from college comes to brownstone to ask for Wolfe's help, but he's killed by a sniper before he can enter the building. Featured: Tim Thomerson [Note: Some elements from the novel The Doorbell Rang (1965) are re-used in this story, but an NYPD intelligence unit which contains a mole secretly working for the mob was substituted for the novel's depiction of a corrupt FBI under J Edgar Hoover.]
3	"Before I Die"	Edward M. Abroms	Alfred Hayes	January 30, 1981
Adapted from Stout's story "Before I Die" (1947) - Wolfe and Archie try to protect the daughter of a notorious gangster. Featured: Ramon Bieri and Russ Tamblyn [Note: In this version, a girl seeks their help after being kidnapped by a rival crime boss, but in the original version Wolfe takes on the gangster as a client because he wants access to black market meat when he was only able to get fish and poultry due to wartime rationining.]
4	"Wolfe at the Door"	Herbert Hirschman	Lee Sheldon	February 6, 1981
Original Story - When Wolfe is summoned to the morgue in the middle of the night to identify Archie's body, he learns that another P.I. has been killed who was pretending to be Archie. Wolfe and Archie pursue a mystery involving a missing lacquer box and a dead executive that the phony Archie previously investigated with the help of someone impersonating Wolfe's voice over the phone. Featured: Mary Frann
5	"Might as Well Be Dead"	George McCowan	Seeleg Lester	February 13, 1981
Adapted from Stout's novel Might as Well Be Dead (1956) - Wolfe is hired to find the long-lost son of a wealthy businessman when the father learns that the son had not stolen money from the family business as originally believed. Wolfe comes to suspect that the son is living under a false name and is currently the defendant in a murder trial. Featured: John de Lancie and Lana Wood
6	"To Catch a Dead Man"	Edward M. Abroms	John Meredyth Lucas	February 20, 1981
Original Story - A shipping magnate enlists Wolfe to investigate the mysterious disappearance of his chief executive from one of his ships. Meanwhile, the rooftop greenhouse is in nearly destroyed when a gunman attacks Wolfe's home. Featured: Kelly Harmon and Charles Cioffi
7	"In the Best Families"	George McCowan	Alfred Hayes	March 6, 1981
Adapted from Stout's novel In the Best Families (1950) - Wolfe is hired by a wealthy older woman to find out where her young handsome second husband is getting his spending money after she stopped supporting his extravagant spending. Soon afterwards, Archie finds the wife stabbed to death. Featured: Robert Loggia and Linden Chiles [Note: In the novel, Wolfe goes undercover as a member of the crime syndicate, but in this adaptation he merely goes into hiding posing as a chef at a friend's upscale restaurant.]
8	"Murder by the Book"	Bob Kelljan	Wallace Ware	March 13, 1981
Adapted from Stout's novel Murder by the Book (1951) - A man with a mysterious list of names, that includes Wolfe on it, gets killed near Wolfe's home. Inspector Cramer demands to know how Wolfe is involved. Later, when a young woman hires Wolfe and Archie to look into the alleged suicide of her sister, Wolfe realizes the two cases are linked. Featured: David Hedison, Delta Burke, and John Randolph [Note: The initial presentation mystery is very similar to that found in the novel, but many changes were necessary to shorten and simplify the story to fit the time constraints of series television.]
9	"What Happened to April"	Edward M. Abroms	Stephen Downing	March 20, 1981
Adapted from Stout's novel Death of a Doxy (1966) - When a rich man's young mistress is discovered murdered, Saul Panzer is suspected of killing her. Wolfe and Archie must find the real killer to clear Saul's name. Featured: Richard Anderson and Thaao Penghlis [Note: Saul is unjustly suspected because of evidence of a platonic friendship. In the novel, it was Orrie Cather rather than Saul who is linked to the dead girl, and he actually had a motive to kill her because she was blackmailing him while he was cheating on his fiancée with her. The television version also gives the mystery a surprise twist ending that wasn't in the book.]
10	"Gambit"	George McCowan	Stephen Kandel	April 3, 1981
A former comrade of Wolfe's from his time running an intelligence unit during the war tracks him down seeking revenge. He accuses Wolfe of betraying him and getting him falsely convicted of treason. He's booby trapped the brownstone and is holding Archie, Fritz, and Theodore hostage until Wolfe confesses that he was the real traitor. Featured: Darren McGavin and Patti Davis [Note: Despite sharing a title with the Nero Wolfe novel Gambit (1962), the story was credited as having been adapted from Booby Trap (1944). Booby Trap had Archie in military intelligence looking for traitors and this story is about Wolfe having had similar wartime experiences in his past. Other than that the only vague similarity is that the villains use explosives.]
11	"Death and the Dolls"	Gerald Mayer	Gerald Sanford	April 10, 1981
Original Story - The granddaughter of an old flame of Nero's has come to him seeking his help. Her father was killed when his boat was destroyed in a suspicious explosion and she suspects her stepmother was involved. Featured: Christine Belford
12	"The Murder in Question"	George McCowan	Merwin Gerard	April 17, 1981
Original Story - The wife of a prominent lawyer comes to Wolfe because she believes someone has been making attempts on her husband's life. Shortly after Wolfe and Archie take her on as a client, she gets murdered. The husband then hires Wolfe to catch her killer. Featured: John Reilly
13	"The Blue Ribbon Hostage"	Ron Satlof	Dick Nelson	May 5, 1981
Original Story - A getaway driver finds himself framed for killing an accomplice after a jewelry heist. The driver steals Wolfe's favorite prize-winning orchid plant, and threatens to destroy it unless Wolfe can prove that he didn't commit the murder. Featured: Kenneth Tigar and Barry Nelson
14	"Sweet Revenge"	George McCowan	Ben Roberts	June 2, 1981
Original Story - A criminal hires two hitmen to kill Archie and Wolfe. They sent his partner from an armed robbery to prison and he wants revenge. When Archie and Wolfe can't agree about what sort of risks need to be taken to catch the killers, it begins to look like the duo's partnership might come to an end. Featured: Ed Lauter and Paul Koslo

== Broadcast history ==
First telecast January 16, 1981, Nero Wolfe aired Fridays from 9 to 10 p.m. ET — as NBC's challenge to the hit CBS show, The Dukes of Hazzard. In April 1981 Nero Wolfe was moved to Tuesdays from 10 to 11 p.m. ET, where it continued to air until June 2, 1981. Repeat episodes continued to air until August 25, 1981.

Nero Wolfe was victim to an NBC programming strategy that was changed not long after the series left the air. Brandon Tartikoff was named president of the network's entertainment division in 1981, and he began to turn around the fortunes of the last-place network. "In the past, a series thought to have 'breakout' potential has been scheduled in a depressed timeslot," Tartikoff told the Associated Press in December 1981. "So Gangster Chronicles was played off against Love Boat, Nero Wolfe against The Dukes of Hazzard, Hill Street Blues against Fantasy Island." Tartikoff implemented a new approach — programming to strengthen an entire evening's primetime schedule rather than challenging another network's hit show.

In April 1996, when the TV Land network made its debut, Nero Wolfe was featured in its "Saturday Cavalcade" lineup of great detectives. In 1999 the series was part of an afternoon block of TV Land's counterprogramming to network soap operas, and it also aired in the wee hours of the morning.

== Awards and nominations ==
Year	Result	Award	Category	Recipient
1981	Nominated	Emmy Award	Outstanding Film Sound Mixing	Nick Gaffey, Gary C. Bourgeois, Lee Minkler, Terry Porter (For episode "Gambit")
1981	Nominated	Emmy Award	Outstanding Cinematography for a Series	Charles W. Short (For episode "Death and the Dolls")

== Reviews and commentary ==
- Donn Downy, The Globe and Mail — Wolfe violated most of the rules in his well-ordered universe, probably because of the scriptwriters' misguided desire to make the character more palatable. In the process, he becomes just a run-of-the-mill private eye who is fatter and wealthier than most, but certainly no smarter or eccentric. Scriptwriters Peter Nasco and David Knapp undermine the character almost from the outset: Wolfe actually discusses a case during the sacred hours in the greenhouse, he smiles, and even leaves his beloved Manhattan brownstone in the final scene to visit a boy recovering in hospital after being hit by a car. Stout, who could never be accused of sentimentality, had the lad dead in the second chapter. But the transgressions don't end there. ... Given these limitations, William Conrad as Wolfe comes off rather well [and] supplied a workmanlike performance, so any faults lie with the writers, not the actor.
- Peter Boyer, Associated Press — I know, I know, the show pales next to The Rockford Files. But I've tried it a couple of times and I think there's a good TV series there, obscured, admittedly, by some inane scripts. Nero Wolfe has some very valuable assets: It is adult, it has at least the broad outlines of mystery and it has a charismatic central character. The character, of course, is the wonderfully eccentric Wolfe of the Rex Stout novels, a rotund, sedentary savant who fusses over orchids and has others do his physical work. NBC and the producers can't take credit for the character, of course, but they did have the good sense to hire William Conrad, who is perfectly suited to the part, to play Wolfe. Conrad seems to delight in the role.
- Los Angeles Times — Not quite Rex Stout's Nero Wolfe but still head and shoulders above most crime series ... Certainly the Tuesday night series has a quality worth more than all the Dukes who ever came out of Hazzard.
- William Conrad — How the hell should I know what makes a hit TV series? I was really excited about doing a show called Nero Wolfe. I thought it couldn't fail. Here we had one of the most popular characters in mystery fiction; everybody has read a Rex Stout novel. The books still sell, although they were written 50 years ago. But do you know how long we lasted? Just 13 weeks. Try to figure that one out.
- Stuart M. Kaminsky — When Nero Wolfe came to television, I made my love of Archie and Wolfe known to NBC, and one of the great disappointments of my professional life is that the series was cancelled after I had been assured that I would write the opening episode of the next season. I wanted to bring The Doorbell Rang to life even if it wasn't the right Wolfe and Archie.
- Diane Holloway, Cox News Service — NBC's woefully inadequate series in 1981 ... tried to update the characters and the language, and the whole thing fell flat.
- Paula Vitaris, Scarlet Street (2002) — Nero Wolfe did give us the brownstone, the rooftop nursery, a housebound Wolfe, and an active Archie, but that was about it. The NBC series updated the setting to contemporary times (1981), which meant Archie, always so fastidious about his wardrobe, could be seen wearing turtlenecks and (horrors!) blue jeans. Inspector Cramer was a brisk professional in three-piece suits rather than Stout's rumpled detective, and Wolfe himself was transformed into a not particularly fascinating eccentric, who in one instance became uncharacteristically nostalgic about a lost love. The show was a mix of new stories and none-too-faithful adaptations of the books.

== Home media ==
Cover of the Visual Entertainment, Inc., DVD release of Rex Stout's Nero Wolfe: The Complete Series (2017)

On May 3, 2017, VEI announced a DVD release for Nero Wolfe. Reported to be "coming soon", Rex Stout's Nero Wolfe: The Complete Series comprises all 14 episodes and the 1977 pilot starring Thayer David.
