= Conrad Dunn =

American actor (born 1950)

- Born: March 9, 1950 (age 76); Los Angeles, California, US
- Occupation: Actor

Conrad Dunn (born March 9, 1950) is an American actor. He began his screen career with the role of Francis "Psycho" Soyer in Stripes (1981). Working for some ten years under the name George Jenesky, he achieved soap-opera stardom in Days of Our Lives as Nick Corelli, a misogynistic pimp who evolved from bad guy to romantic lead. He returned to the name Conrad Dunn and began working extensively in Canadian as well as U.S. film and television. He excels as a villain, and has found depth in such TV films as We the Jury (1996) and the miniseries The Last Don (1997–1998). For two seasons he portrayed the freelance detective Saul Panzer in the A&E TV series Nero Wolfe (2001–2002). He is also a veteran stage performer and director who studied at East Los Angeles College, the American Academy of Dramatic Arts in Los Angeles and the Stella Adler Conservatory in New York.

== Life and career ==
Born and raised in Los Angeles, Conrad Dunn studied at East Los Angeles College, the American Academy of Dramatic Arts in Los Angeles, and with Stella Adler in New York. After seeing him on the stage, a casting director asked him to read for the role of Francis "Psycho" Soyer in Stripes (1981), his first feature film. (Note: Before working in Stripes, Dunn filmed scenes for Evilspeak (1981)—as a character called Captain Martindale—that did not appear in the final release.) His introductory speech, described by one reviewer as "Conrad Dunn's adroit tribute to Travis Bickle", was singled out by film critic Roger Ebert:

The movie has especially good writing in several scenes. My favorite comes near the beginning, during a session when recruits in the new platoon get to know one another. One obviously psycho draftee, who looks like Robert De Niro, quietly announces that if his fellow soldiers touch him, touch his stuff, or interfere in any way with his person or his privacy, he will quite simply be forced to kill them.

The response from drill sergeant Hulka, played by Warren Oates—"Lighten up, Francis"—became a popular movie quote.

Taking the name George Jenesky, Dunn performed over seven seasons (1981–1990) in the NBC daytime soap opera Days of Our Lives. His character, Nick Corelli, became a fan favorite, a despicable pimp who evolved into a romantic lead and one of the show's main characters. Nick's murder was one of the series' notable whodunits.

He has made numerous appearances in films and on television, frequently as the villain. In the mid-1990s he returned to the name Conrad Dunn and began working extensively in Canada as well as the U.S. Notable TV roles include an antagonistic juror in the USA Network film We the Jury (1996), a remorseless mobster in two CBS miniseries (1997–1998) adapted from Mario Puzo's The Last Don, and the arch villain in the 2000 pilot for TNT's supernatural drama series Witchblade. In 2001 he joined the principal cast of the A&E TV series Nero Wolfe (2001–2002), portraying the superlatively competent freelance detective Saul Panzer for two seasons. His later appearances include the films Chicago (2002), Owning Mahowny (2003) and Ving Rhames' Animal 2 (2007), and the TV series Suits (2012).

In addition to his work in film and television, Dunn was artistic director of three acting companies—The Frances Farmer Memorial Players (1977–1979), The Fly by Night Players (1981–1982) and The Dakota Repertory Theatre Company (1983–1991). He produced and performed in two notable Los Angeles productions—the award-winning Guests of the Nation (1989), and the first Equity performance of Seed of Darkness: The Final Tale of Edgar Allan Poe (1990)—that were both directed by Ron Burrus, leading exponent of the work of Stella Adler.

Dunn's other stage credits include a 1994 production of Edward Albee's The Zoo Story, simultaneously performed in American Sign Language. "Notwithstanding the value of bringing this important work to a non-hearing audience, the energy of the gestures generated by the actors actually underscores the emotional impact of their fateful encounter," wrote Variety. He later performed in Jim Garrard's Peggy's Song in Toronto (2012), North Hollywood (2019) and Kingston, Ontario (2020), and was recognized as best actor in a play at the 2019 Valley Theatre Awards. Dunn has also directed many original one-act plays showcasing the writers and actors at the Actors Workout Studio, in the NoHo Arts District of Los Angeles.

== Filmography ==
Year	Title	Role	Notes
1981	Stripes	Francis "Psycho" Soyer	
1981	Days of Our Lives (TV series)	Nick Corelli	as George Jenesky
1983	T.J. Hooker (TV series)	Douglas Nelson	"Too Late for Love"
1983	Buffalo Bill (TV series)		"Woody Quits"
1983	Alice (TV series)	Customer	"The Robot Wore Pink"
1984	Days of Our Lives	Nick Corelli	as George Jenesky
1985	Hill Street Blues (TV series)	Sonny Murdo	"You're in Alice's"
1986	Stewardess School	Referee	as George Jenesky
1986	Jumpin' Jack Flash	Man with Umbrella at Phone Booth	as George Jenesky
1986	Amazing Stories (TV series)	Gas Station Attendant; Warden's Guard	"Gather Ye Acorns", as George Jenesky "Life on Death Row", as George Jenesky
1986	Hunter (TV series)	Rocket	"The Set Up", as George Jenesky
1986–1990	Days of Our Lives	Nick Corelli	as George Jenesky
1988	Alien Nation	Quint	as George Jenesky
1989	True Believer	Slim Jim	as George Jenesky
1988	Hunter	Tommy Orlowski	"Presumed Guilty", as George Jenesky
1990	Death Warrant	Konefke	as George Jenesky
1990	Dark Justice (TV series)	Ted	"Prime Cuts", as George Jenesky
1992	Tequila and Bonetti (TV series)	Wayne	"Mama", as George Jenesky
1993	Inside Edge	Hip-Hop	as George Jenesky
1993	Without Warning: Terror in the Towers (TV)	Mohammed Salameh	as George Jenesky
1995	Highlander: The Series (TV series)	Matthew	"Blind Faith"
1995	The Marshal (TV series)	Louie-Louie	"Rainbow Comix"
1995	Due South (TV series)	Siracusa	"The Witness"
1996	Side Effects (TV series)	Dr. Irwin Pfaff	"Behind the Scenes"
1996	Ed McBain's 87th Precinct: Ice (TV)	Henry Gore	
1996	Mask of Death	Frank Dallio	
1996	Silent Trigger	Klein "Supervisor"	
1996	We the Jury (TV)	Rafael Ramos	
1996	Kung Fu: The Legend Continues (TV series)	Mr. Marsden	"Who Is Kwai Chang Caine?"
1997	The Last Don (TV miniseries)	Lia Vazzi	
1997	F/X: The Series (TV series)		"Script Doctor"
1997	Goosebumps (TV series)	Grimm	"The Barking Ghost"
1997	The New Ghostwriter Mysteries (TV series)	Harry	"Designer Crime"
1998	Mr. Headmistress	Farley	
1998	The Last Don II (TV miniseries)	Lia Vazzi	
1999	Traders (TV series)		"Eat the Loss"
1999	Vendetta (TV)	Pasquale Corte	
1999	The Famous Jett Jackson (TV series)	Marley	"Saving Mr. Dupree"
1999	Black and Blue (TV)	Enrique	
1999	Execution of Justice (TV)	Gay Teacher	
2000	Harry's Case (TV)		
2000	La Femme Nikita (TV series)	The Director of Red Cell	"Sleeping with the Enemy"
2000	Witchblade (TV)	Tommy Gallo	
2000	Turn It Up	Urie	
2001	Haven (TV miniseries)	Josef	
2001–2002	Nero Wolfe (TV series)	Saul Panzer	(Note: Appearances in episodes of Nero Wolfe are as follows: "The Doorbell Rang", "Champagne for One", "Prisoner's Base", "Eeny, Meeny, Murder, Moe", "Disguise for Murder", "Door to Death", "Christmas Party", "Over My Dead Body", "Death of a Doxy", "The Next Witness", "Motherhunt", "Too Many Clients", "Before I Die" and "The Silent Speaker".)
2002	Witchblade (TV series)	Tommy Gallo	"Emergence" "Hierophant"
2002	Martin and Lewis (TV)	Lou Perry	
2002	Chicago	Doctor	
2003	Control Factor (TV)	Thrillkill	
2003	Owning Mahowny	Edgar	
2003	Blue Murder (TV series)	Kenney Roswell	"John Doe"
2003	Veritas: The Quest (TV series)	Moondawg	"Skulls"
2004	Direct Action	Captain Stone	
2004	Zeyda and the Hitman	Mr. Valenti	
2004	Clubhouse (TV series)	Defense Lawyer	"Road Trip"
2004	The Eleventh Hour (TV series)		"Megan Ice Cream"
2005	Cool Money (TV)	City	
2006	Puppets Who Kill (TV series)	Plumber	"Mr. Big"
2006	At the Hotel (TV series)	Señor Arioso	"Modern Solutions to Modern Problems"
2006	Covert One: The Hades Factor (TV miniseries)	Ghalib Hassan	
2006	Jeff Ltd. (TV series)	Vincent	"Ali Baba and the 40 Carpets" "Nightmare on Stevens Street"
2007	Animal 2	Kasada	
2007	Degrassi: The Next Generation (TV series)	Vlad	"Don't You Want Me?"
2007	The Dead Zone (TV series)	Frankie Toro	"Drift"
2009	Murdoch Mysteries (TV series)	Professor Otranto	"Snakes and Ladders"
2011	XIII: The Series (TV series)	Peralta	"Costa Verde"
2012	Suits (TV series)	Oscar Mendoza	"Break Point"

== Select theatre credits ==
Date	Title	Author	Role	Notes
June 1977	Catch-22	Joseph Heller	Yossarian	Venture Theatre, West Hollywood; Directed by Joe Ivy
October – October 29, 1978	Moonchildren	Michael Weller	ensemble cast	Stage 13, West Hollywood; Directed by John Karlen
September – October 1979	At Home	Conrad Bromberg		Stage 13, West Hollywood; Directed by Conrad Dunn
September – October 1979	The Girl Who Loved The Beatles	D. B. Gilles	ensemble cast	Stage 13, West Hollywood; Directed by Sam O'Neal
August – September 12, 1982	Split	Michael Weller	ensemble cast	McCadden Place Theater, Los Angeles; Directed by Ron Burrus
July – July 16, 1983	The Zoo Story	Edward Albee	Jerry	The Gardner Stage, West Hollywood
February – March 29, 1986	Guests of the Nation	Neil McKenzie	Jeremiah	Night Flight Theatre, Burbank; Produced and directed by Conrad Dunn
May 11 – June 11, 1989	Guests of the Nation	Neil McKenzie	'Awkins	Court Theatre, Los Angeles; Directed by Ron Burrus; Produced by Conrad Dunn
October – October 20, 1989	Domino Courts	William Hauptman	Roy	Actors Forum, Hollywood; Directed by Ron Burrus
April 6 – May 28, 1990	Seed of Darkness	Lawrence Riggins	Edgar Poe	Tamarind Theatre, Hollywood; Directed by Ron Burrus; Produced by Conrad Dunn
February 14 – March 15, 1992	Wait Until Dark	Frederick Knott	Harry Roat Jr.	Simi Valley Cultural Arts Center, Simi Valley; Directed by Frederick Hoffman
April – May 2, 1993	The Zoo Story	Edward Albee	Jerry	Los Feliz Playhouse, Los Angeles; Directed by Jodi Binstock
March 25 – July 30, 1994	The Zoo Story	Edward Albee	Jerry	Actors Workout Studio, North Hollywood; Directed by Jodi Binstock; Produced by Conrad Dunn
September 13–30, 2001	The Uninvited Guest	Bonnie Anderson		Tarragon Extra Space, Toronto; Directed by Conrad Dunn
November 8–12, 2012	Peggy's Song	Jim Garrard	Patterson	Red Sandcastle Theatre, Toronto; Directed by Conrad Dunn
February 16 – March 24, 2019	Peggy's Song	Jim Garrard	Patterson	Actors Workout Studio, North Hollywood; Directed by Conrad Dunn; Produced by Lisa Howard Cerone and Conrad Dunn; Best Lead Actor in a Play, 2019 Valley Theatre Awards
January 23 – February 9, 2020	Peggy's Song	Jim Garrard	Patterson	Baby Grand Theatre, Kingston, Ontario; Directed by Jacob James
November 6–21, 2021	The Uninvited Guest	Bonnie Anderson		The Sherry Theater, North Hollywood; Directed by Conrad Dunn
