= Michael Prichard =

American actor and audiobook reader

Michael Prichard is an American actor and audiobook reader.

Prichard grew up on a farm in Kansas, and first developed his baritone voice by singing. He earned an MFA in theater from the University of Southern California.

He is best known for narrating audiobooks, including the complete Nero Wolfe mystery series by Rex Stout and the complete Travis McGee thriller series by John D. MacDonald. During his career, he has narrated more than five hundred audiobooks.

In recognition of his narration work, he received the Audie Award for History in 2010, as well as multiple AudioFile Earphone Awards.

In addition to recording audiobooks, Prichard has acted on stage with Ray Bradbury's Pandemonium Theatre Company and with the Pacific Resident Theatre.
