= Help Wanted, Male =

- Short story by Rex Stout
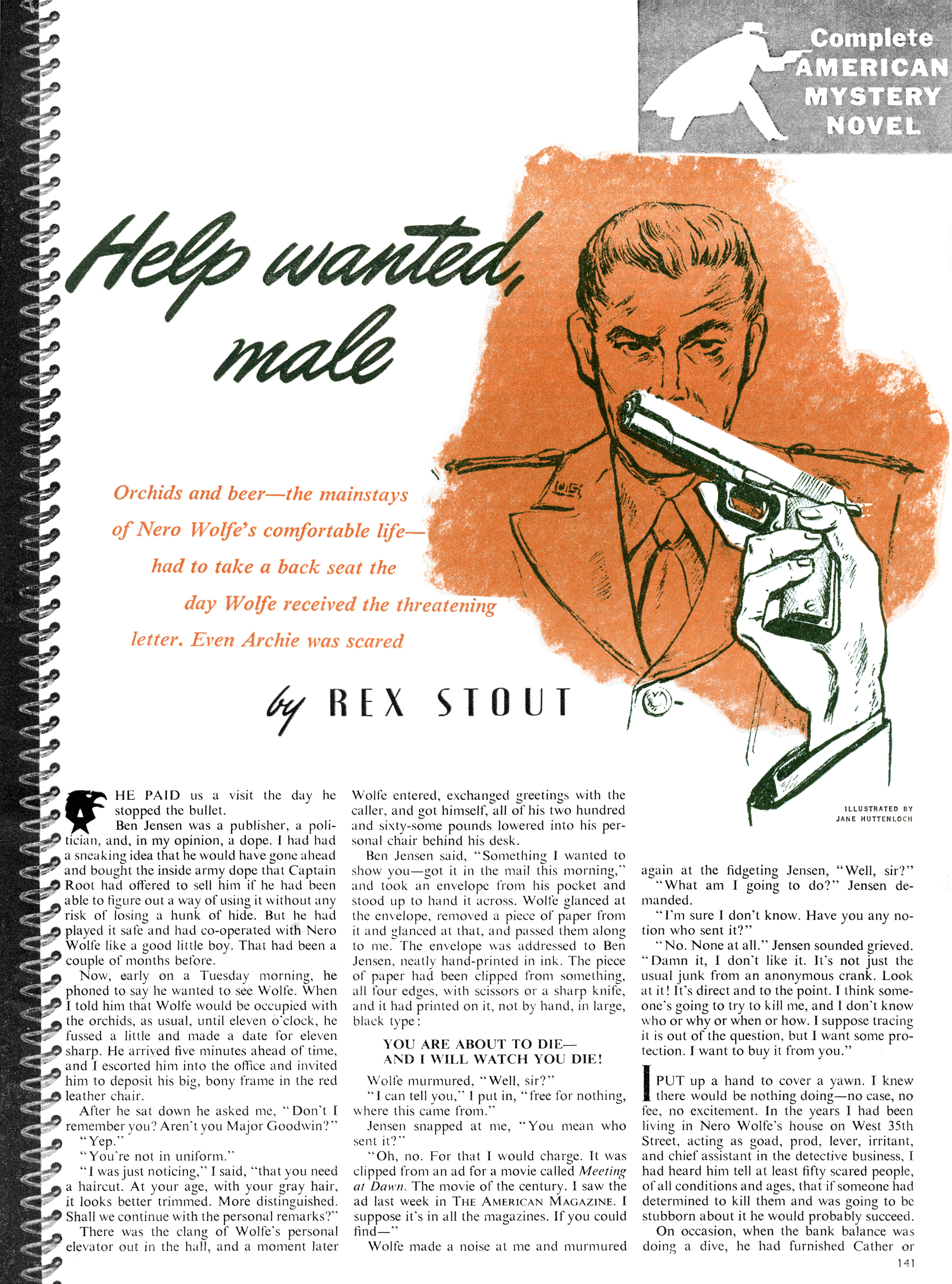
- Illustrated by Jane Huttenloch
- Country: United States
- Language: English
- Genre: Detective fiction

Publication
- Published in: The American Magazine
- Publication type: Periodical
- Publication date: August 1945
- Series: Nero Wolfe

"Help Wanted, Male" is a Nero Wolfe mystery novella by Rex Stout, first published in the August 1945 issue of The American Magazine. It first appeared in book form in the short-story collection Trouble in Triplicate, published by the Viking Press in 1949.

== Plot summary ==
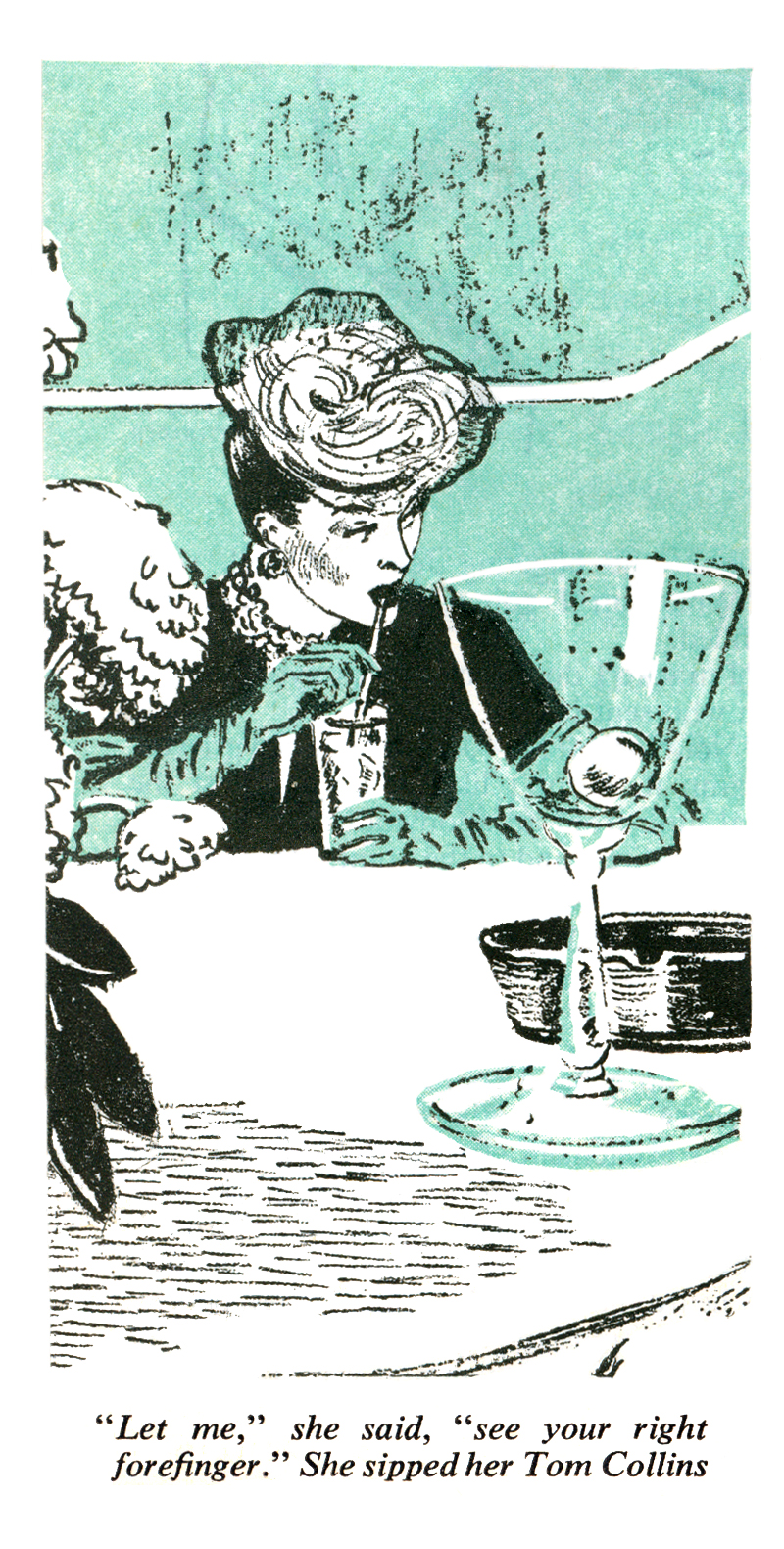
Jane Huttenloch illustrated "Help Wanted, Male" for The American Magazine (August 1945)

Publisher Ben Jensen pays a visit to Wolfe's office, intent on buying protection for himself after receiving a death threat in the mail. (Note: Archie recognizes the threat as a clipping from a movie advertisement in The American Magazine, in which many Wolfe stories, including this one, first appeared.) Wolfe declines the offer, giving Jensen some advice on how to look out for his own safety, and Archie provides him with the name of an agency that does bodyguard work. Jensen had been involved in one of Wolfe's earlier cases, (Note: Not part of the corpus of Wolfe stories. It has been stated that "Help Wanted, Male" is in some sense a sequel to "Booby Trap", but the two stories are completely independent of one another.) in which an Army captain named Peter Root had offered to sell him classified information. Root was brought before a court martial and sentenced to three years in prison.

The following morning's newspaper carries a report that both Jensen and the bodyguard he hired have been shot and killed; Wolfe denies to Inspector Cramer that he is taking any interest in the case. That day's mail brings a death threat addressed to Wolfe, identical to the one Jensen received. Since the Root case is all that Wolfe and Jensen had in common, Wolfe and Archie track down current information on everyone connected to it, including Root's family and fiancée, Jane Geer. Archie hurries to fill his end of the order before he must leave for a meeting in Washington, D.C., with his superiors in Army Intelligence. He locates Jane and brings her to the brownstone, but they are both surprised to find Jensen's son, Emil—an Army major—waiting at the door. Wolfe does not come down to meet them, but instead orders Archie over the in-house telephone to send them away.

While in Washington, Archie notices a help-wanted advertisement in a New York paper, calling for male applicants who are the same height and weight as Wolfe. Sneaking out of his meeting and hurrying back to Manhattan, Archie is surprised to see someone other than Wolfe in the detective's custom-built chair. Wolfe introduces the man as H.H. Hackett, who has responded to the ad and is being paid $100 per day to impersonate him at home and in public. He is using Hackett as a decoy to draw the fire of would-be killers so that he can determine who might want him dead.

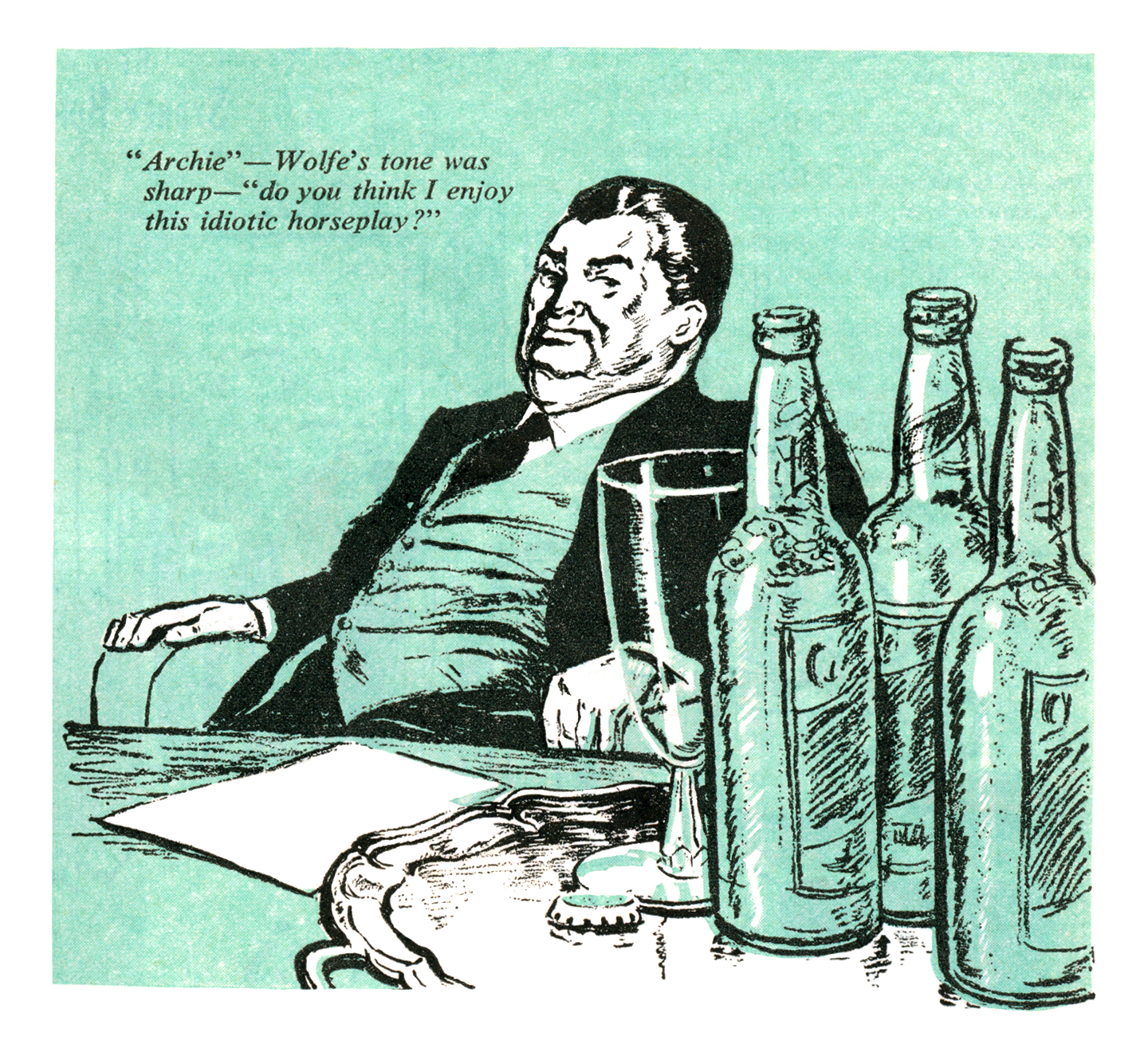
"Archie"—Wolfe's tone was sharp—"do you think I enjoy this idiotic horseplay?"

Wolfe has determined, from information provided by Army Intelligence, that Root and his parents had no apparent involvement in the murders. He asks Archie to bring Jane in for an interview, with Hackett doubling for him while he observes from the peephole in the office wall. Archie now understands why Wolfe sent her away earlier; he did not want her to see him in person so that she would be fooled by Hackett as a stand-in. Jane and Emil arrive for the appointment together, having developed a close relationship since Archie last saw them. He puts them in the front room and goes to consult with Wolfe about Emil's unexpected presence, but the sound of a gunshot startles everyone.

Rushing into the office, Archie finds that a bullet has been fired through Wolfe's chair and into the wall behind it, apparently from the front room, and that Hackett's ear is nicked. Archie finds an old, recently fired revolver hidden in the front room, and Wolfe reveals himself to the visitors and takes charge. He calls Cramer to inform him about the weapon, which turns out to be the one that killed Jensen and the bodyguard, and pits Jane and Emil against each other in an effort to draw out the killer. However, the case turns in a new direction when he notices a cushion missing from the front room's couch. It is soon found in the bottom drawer of Wolfe's desk; this discovery, along with the fact that one of the guns in Archie's desk has been recently fired, allows him to solve the case and turn the culprit over to Cramer.

The murderer is Hackett, actually Root's father, Thomas, bent on revenge against everyone he blames for his son's imprisonment. After killing Jensen and the bodyguard, and sending the death threat to Wolfe, he responded to Wolfe's ad and smuggled the murder weapon inside. During a time when he was alone in the office, he took a cushion from the couch, wrapped it around the gun to muffle the report, and fired a shot through the chair and into the wall. He hid the cushion in the desk and the gun in the front room, and made sure to sit in the chair so that his head would cover the bullet hole. While Jane and Emil were waiting in the front room, he took a gun from Archie's desk, fired into the cushion, and used a pocketknife to cut a gash in his ear before returning the gun. Given one more day, Hackett/Thomas would have been able to kill Wolfe and focus suspicion on Jane and Emil.

== Cast of characters ==
- Nero Wolfe – The private investigator
- Archie Goodwin – Wolfe's assistant, and the narrator of all Wolfe stories
- Ben Jensen – Publisher and a witness in a prior case against Captain Peter Root
- Major Emil Jensen – Ben Jensen's son, an Army major
- Jane Geer – Peter's ex-fiancée
- H. H. Hackett – A retired architect whom Wolfe hires to act as a body-double
- Inspector Cramer and Sgt. Purley Stebbins – Representing Manhattan Homicide

== Adaptations ==
=== Nero Wolfe (A&E Network) ===
With the help of Fritz (Colin Fox), Nero Wolfe (Maury Chaykin) realizes how the killer diverted suspicion to others in A&E's 16:9 letterboxed version of "Help Wanted, Male"

"Help Wanted, Male" was adapted for the second season of the A&E TV series A Nero Wolfe Mystery (2001–2002). Directed by John L'Ecuyer from a teleplay by Sharon Elizabeth Doyle, "Help Wanted, Male" made its debut June 23, 2002, on A&E.

Timothy Hutton is Archie Goodwin; Maury Chaykin is Nero Wolfe. Other members of the cast (in credits order) include Colin Fox (Fritz Brenner), Bill Smitrovich (Inspector Cramer), R.D. Reid (Sergeant Purley Stebbins), James Tolkan (Ben Jenson), Richard Waugh (Major Emil Jensen), George Plimpton (General Carpenter), Robert Bockstael (Colonel Dickey), Steve Cumyn (Peter Root), Kari Matchett (Jane Geer), Larry Drake (Hackett) and Randy Butcher (Doyle).

In addition to original music by Nero Wolfe composer Michael Small, the soundtrack includes music by Alan Moorhouse (titles), (Note: Alan Moorhouse, "In the Swing". KPM Music, KPM 91, Music of the 20s, 30s and 40s (track 20).) Tony Kinsey (Note: Tony Kinsey, "Railroad Boogie". KPM Music, KPM 278, Jazz Then and Now (track 20).) and Dick Walter. (Note: Dick Walter, "Piano at Midnight". KPM Music, KPM 443, Background Music Too (track 36).)

In North America, A Nero Wolfe Mystery is available on Region 1 DVD from A&E Home Video (ISBN 0-7670-8893-X). The A&E DVD release presents "Help Wanted, Male" in 4:3 pan and scan rather than its 16:9 aspect ratio for widescreen viewing.

The episode is faithful to the story except for a major change at the end. Instead of Inspector Cramer and Sergeant Stebbins leading Thomas Root away and Wolfe asking Emil Jensen to make a donation to the National War Fund instead of paying him, Stebbins escorts Root out while Cramer stays behind in Wolfe's office. When Jensen is about to offer Wolfe payment for finding his father's killer, Cramer grumpily informs Jensen that Wolfe had refused to provide his father with protection after he came to him for help, prompting Jensen to close his checkbook and leave with Jane Geer.

== Publication history ==
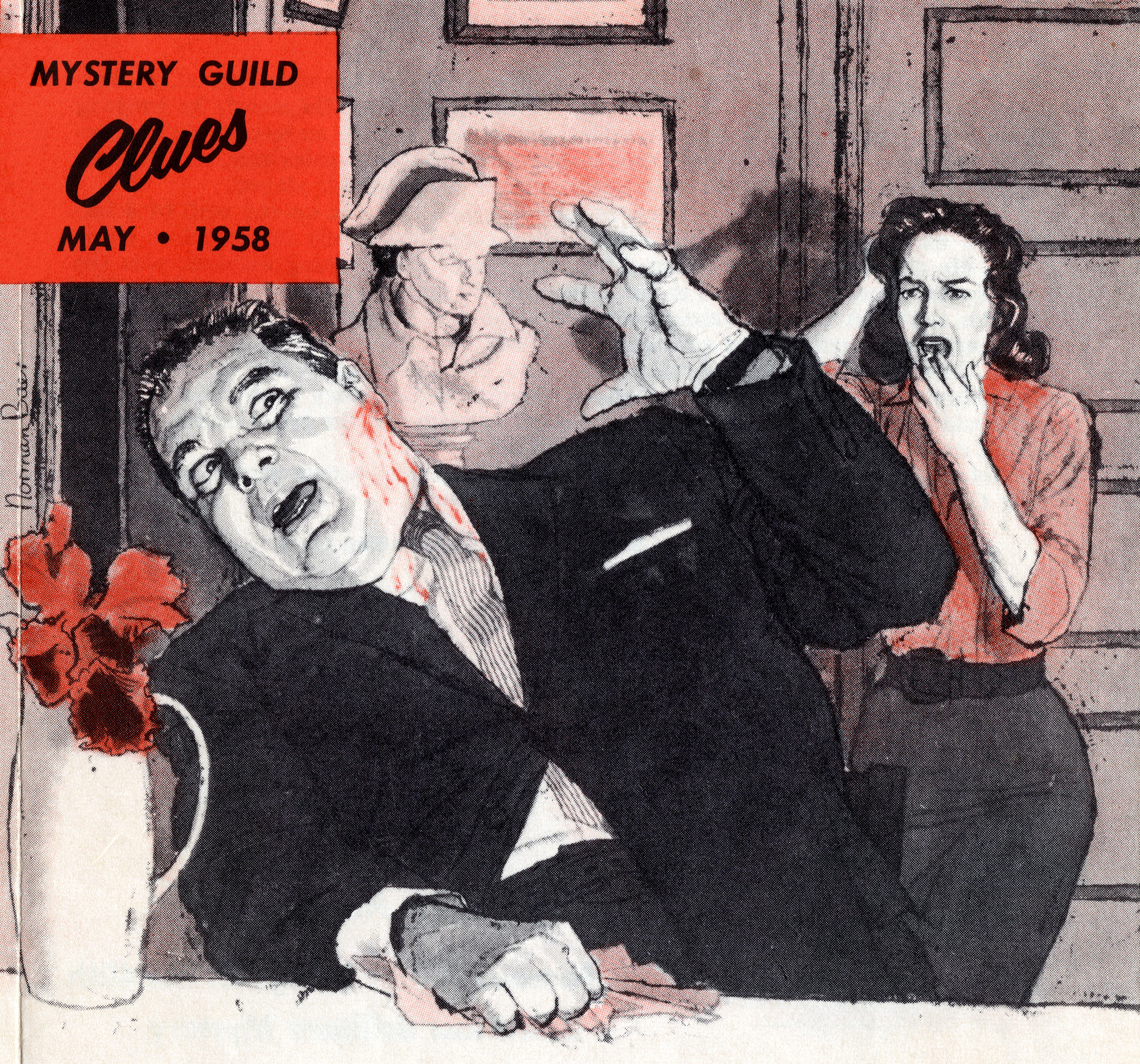
A scene from "Help Wanted, Male" illustrated the cover of a Mystery Guild leaflet featuring All Aces (1958), a Nero Wolfe omnibus volume that included Trouble in Triplicate.

=== "Help Wanted, Male" ===
- 1945, The American Magazine, August 1945
- 1946, Rex Stout's Mystery Monthly, June 1946
- 1948, Ellery Queen's Mystery Magazine, February 1948
- 1963, Ellery Queen's Anthology, 1963
- 1969, Ellery Queen's Shoot the Works, New York: Pyramid T-2129, November 1969
- 1976, Masterpieces of Mystery: The Grand Masters, ed. by Ellery Queen, New York: Davis Publications, 1976

=== Trouble in Triplicate ===
- 1949, New York: The Viking Press, February 11, 1949, hardcover

Contents include "Before I Die", "Help Wanted, Male" and "Instead of Evidence".
Bookseller and publisher Otto Penzler describes the first edition of Trouble in Triplicate: "Yellow cloth, front cover and spine printed with red; rear cover blank. Issued in a pink, black and white dust wrapper." In April 2006, Firsts: The Book Collector's Magazine estimated that the first edition of Trouble in Triplicate had a value of between $300 and $500. The estimate is for a copy in very good to fine condition in a like dustjacket.

- 1949, Toronto: Macmillan, 1949, hardcover
- 1949, New York: Viking (Mystery Guild), August 1949, hardcover (Note: The far less valuable Viking book club edition may be distinguished from the first edition in three ways: The dust jacket has "Book Club Edition" printed on the inside front flap, and the price is absent (first editions may be price clipped if they were given as gifts).; Book club editions are sometimes thinner and always taller (usually a quarter of an inch) than first editions.; Book club editions are bound in cardboard, and first editions are bound in cloth (or have at least a cloth spine).)
- 1949, London: Collins Crime Club, August 22, 1949, hardcover
- 1951, New York: Bantam #925, September 1951, paperback
- 1958, New York: The Viking Press, All Aces: A Nero Wolfe Omnibus (with Some Buried Caesar and Too Many Women), May 15, 1958, hardcover
- 1993, New York: Bantam Crimeline ISBN 0-553-24247-4 June 1, 1993, paperback
- 1996, Newport Beach, California: Books on Tape, Inc. ISBN 0-7366-3268-9 January 25, 1996, audio cassette (unabridged, read by Michael Prichard)
- 2010, New York: Bantam Crimeline ISBN 978-0-307-75631-2 May 19, 2010, e-book
