= List of book sales clubs =

This is a list of book sales clubs, both current and defunct.

- Book League of America
- Book of the Month Club
- Büchergilde Gutenberg (Switzerland)
- Collins Crime Club
- Folio Society
- Junior Library Guild
- Left Book Club
- Literary Guild
- Quality Paperback Book Club
- Scholastic Corporation
- Science Fiction Book Club
- Time Reading Program
- Wissenschaftliche Buchgesellschaft

== See also ==
- Book discussion club
