= Instead of Evidence =

- Short story by Rex Stout
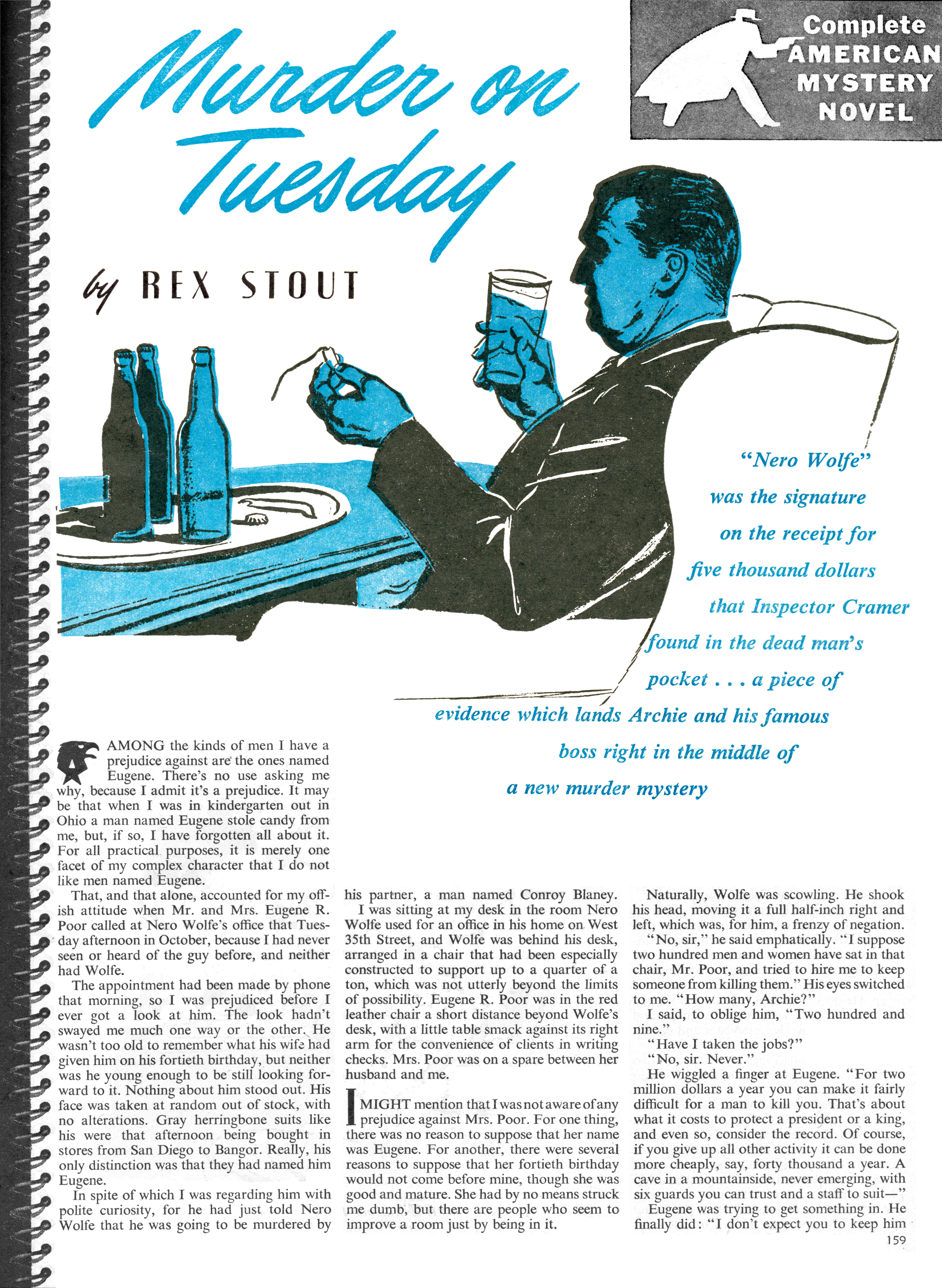
- Illustrated by Jane Huttenloch
- Original title: Murder on Tuesday
- Country: United States
- Language: English
- Genre: Detective fiction

Publication
- Published in: The American Magazine
- Publication type: Periodical
- Publication date: May 1946
- Series: Nero Wolfe

"Instead of Evidence" is a Nero Wolfe mystery novella by Rex Stout, first published in the May 1946 issue of The American Magazine under the title "Murder on Tuesday". It first appeared in book form in the short-story collection Trouble in Triplicate, published by the Viking Press in 1949.

== Plot summary ==
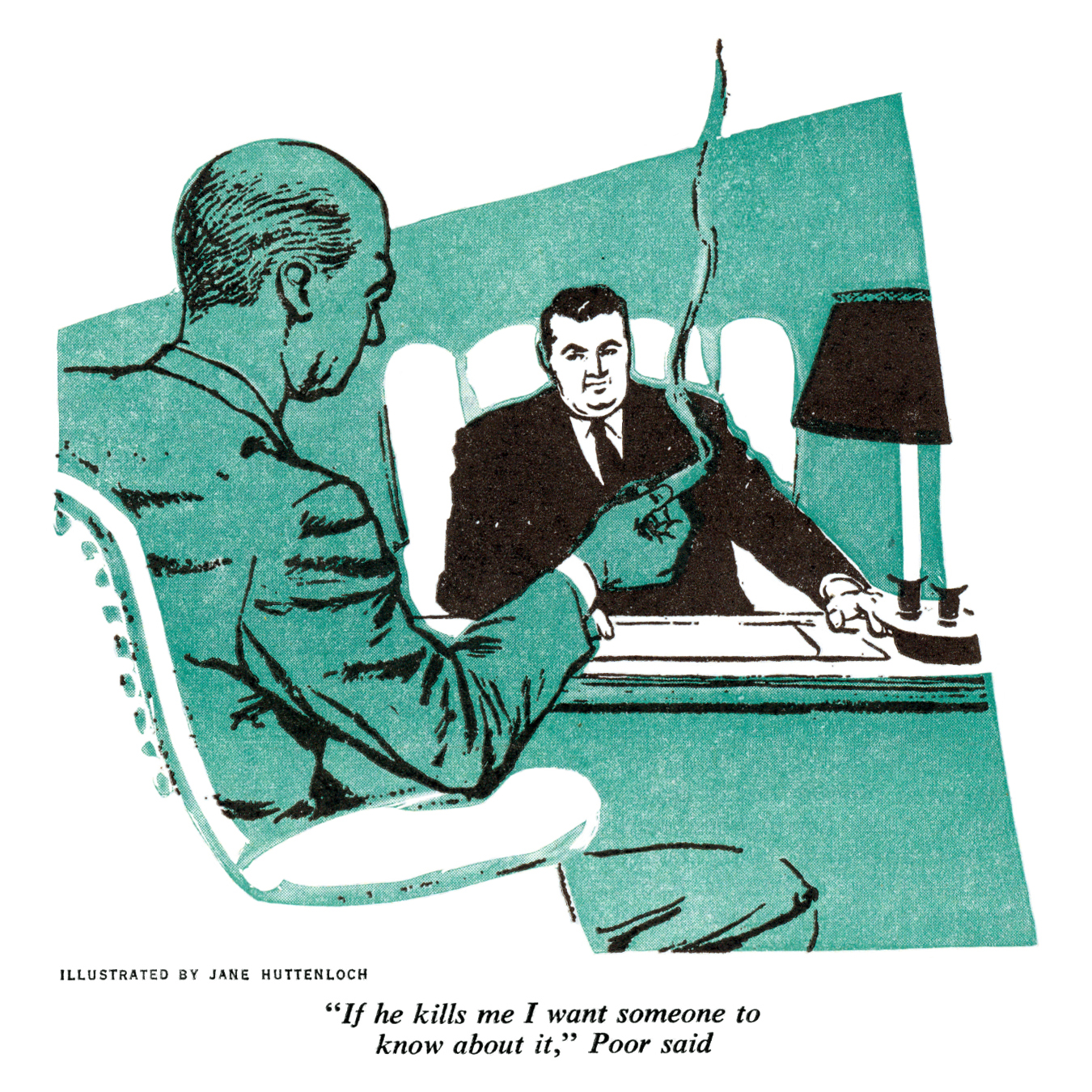
"If he kills me, I want somebody to know about it," Poor said.

Eugene R. Poor, co-owner of a novelty products company, and his wife, Martha, bring an unusual problem to Wolfe. Poor believes that his business partner, Conroy Blaney, is going to kill him and take full control of the company; he wants Wolfe to ensure that justice is done on Blaney when it happens. Martha has tried to persuade Poor to sell his share of the company to Blaney, without success, but Poor is determined to see his own murderer punished. Wolfe accepts a $5,000 fee, agreeing only to inform the police of what Poor has told him if Poor dies within one year.

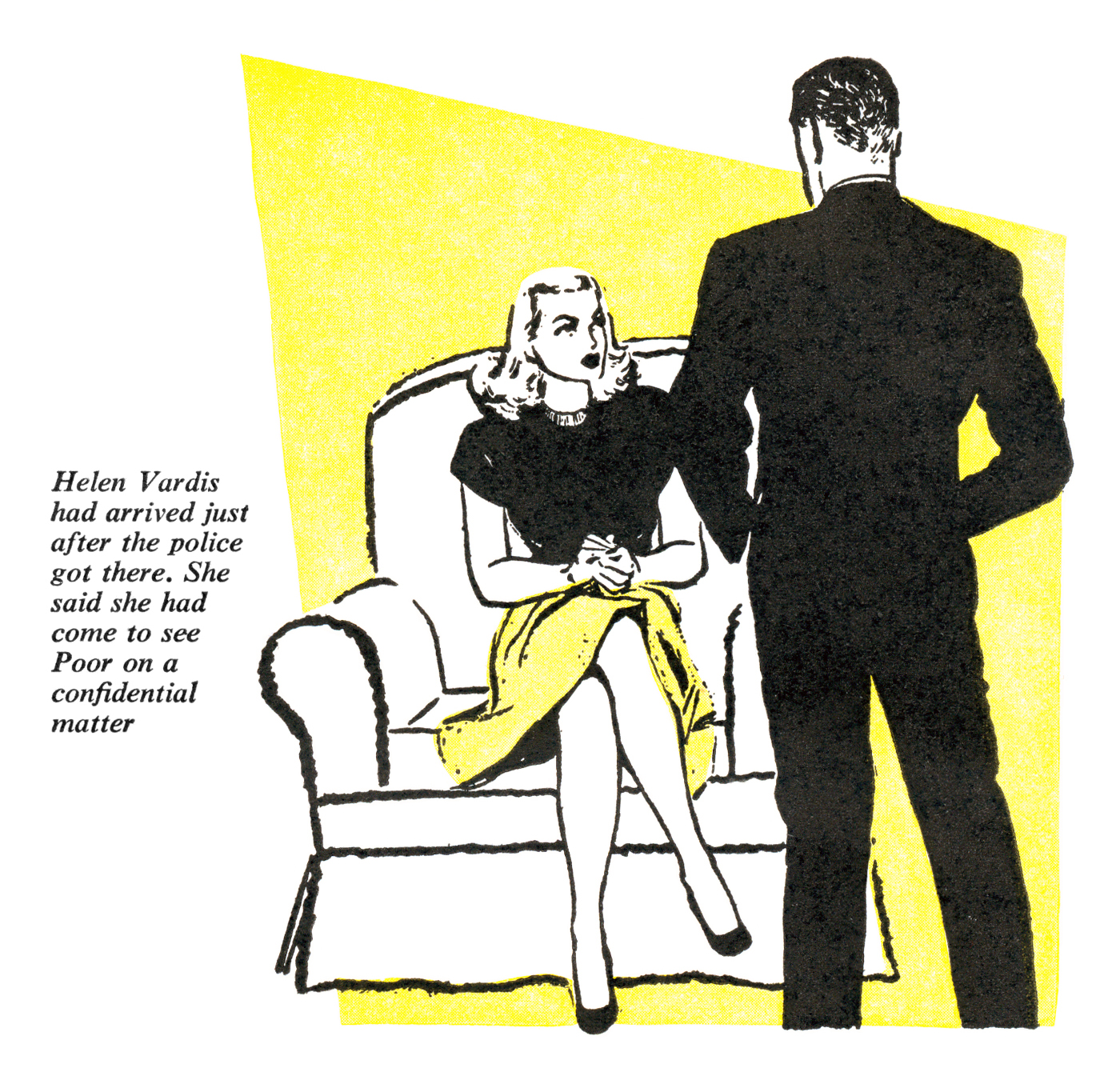
Helen Vardis had arrived just after the police got there. She said she had come to see Poor on a confidential matter.

That evening, Inspector Cramer calls Wolfe with news that Poor is dead, his head blown apart by an exploding cigar in his own apartment. Visiting the scene, Archie learns from Martha that she and Poor had started off to visit Blaney at his estate in White Plains for a business discussion, but Poor had decided during the trip not to go. She left him at a tavern along the way, went to the meeting alone, and picked him up on the return trip. Once back in the apartment, he had opened a fresh box of cigars and lit one, but it exploded with great force and killed him. Archie also meets Joe Groll, the foreman at the company's factory, and Helen Vardis, an employee. Blaney also arrives at the scene and is shocked to see Poor's remains.

The next day, Cramer brings news to Wolfe that every cigar in that box had been rigged with a small but powerful explosive capsule, manufactured for military use by a different company, and that two of Martha's hairs were found inside. Wolfe considers this to be evidence against her involvement, since a person involved in such painstaking work would be careful not to leave any traces. Blaney visits the brownstone as well to argue for his own innocence, but his annoying manner soon drives Wolfe to send him away. Wolfe calls Saul Panzer in to investigate, having taken an interest in finding photographs of Poor when he was alive, and Archie catches up to Groll for a talk and realizes that Helen has been following them. The three search the company offices and find several hiding places, one of which contains four explosive capsules.

At the brownstone, Wolfe tests one of the capsules by placing it in a coffee percolator and lighting its fuse; it explodes violently enough to damage the percolator and hurl its lid across the office, barely missing him. Wolfe dispatches Archie to take two of the others to Cramer, who threatens to get a warrant for the last one. Wolfe takes a sudden interest in a newspaper article about a man found dead in White Plains with his head crushed, and calls the local district attorney to confirm his identity as Arthur Howell, an employee of the company that had manufactured the capsules. Once the body has been identified, Wolfe sends Archie to see Martha with a photograph of Poor (obtained by Saul) that has the last capsule taped to it. Archie warns Martha that he has orders to deliver her to either Wolfe or the police, but she instead kills herself by putting the capsule in her mouth and setting it off.

A furious Cramer confronts Wolfe at the brownstone, but Wolfe maintains that he has broken no laws in prodding Martha to suicide. He had realized that the man who came to see him was an impostor, since Poor was an experienced cigar smoker and the man had barely been able to light one properly. Martha chose Howell for her plot to kill her husband because he bore a strong resemblance to Poor, and she persuaded him to give her some of the capsules so she could spike Poor's cigars. During her supposed meeting with Blaney in White Plains, she met with Howell and killed him, running over his head with her car. The photograph that Saul obtained was actually of Howell, but Archie mistook it as one of Poor because he did not know of Howell's existence at the time.

Cramer points out that it was Martha who paid Wolfe the $5,000, but Wolfe counters by saying that Poor got his money's worth even if he did not directly pay the fee.

== The unfamiliar word ==
"Readers of the Wolfe saga often have to turn to the dictionary because of the erudite vocabulary of Wolfe and sometimes of Archie," wrote Rev. Frederick G. Gotwald.

Examples of unfamiliar words — or unfamiliar uses of words that some would otherwise consider familiar — are found throughout the corpus, often in the give-and-take between Wolfe and Archie.

- Abditory, chapter 6. "Few will ever have come across abditory," writes etymologist Michael Quinion. "It’s a hiding place, from Latin abditorium, a hiding place, whose source is abdere, to put away or hide. It appears in the story Instead of Evidence, in which explosive devices were found in an abditory in a factory. The Oxford English Dictionary notes its first example from 1658, but it has never been in common use."

== Cast of characters ==
- Nero Wolfe — The private investigator
- Archie Goodwin — Wolfe's assistant, and the narrator of all Wolfe stories
- Eugene Poor — Partner in a manufacturing business, murdered by an exploding cigar
- Martha Poor — His wife
- Conroy Blaney — His business partner
- Helen Vardis — An employee of Blaney and Poor
- Joe Groll — Factory foreman
- Inspector Cramer and Lieutenant Rowcliff — Representing Manhattan Homicide

== Publication history ==
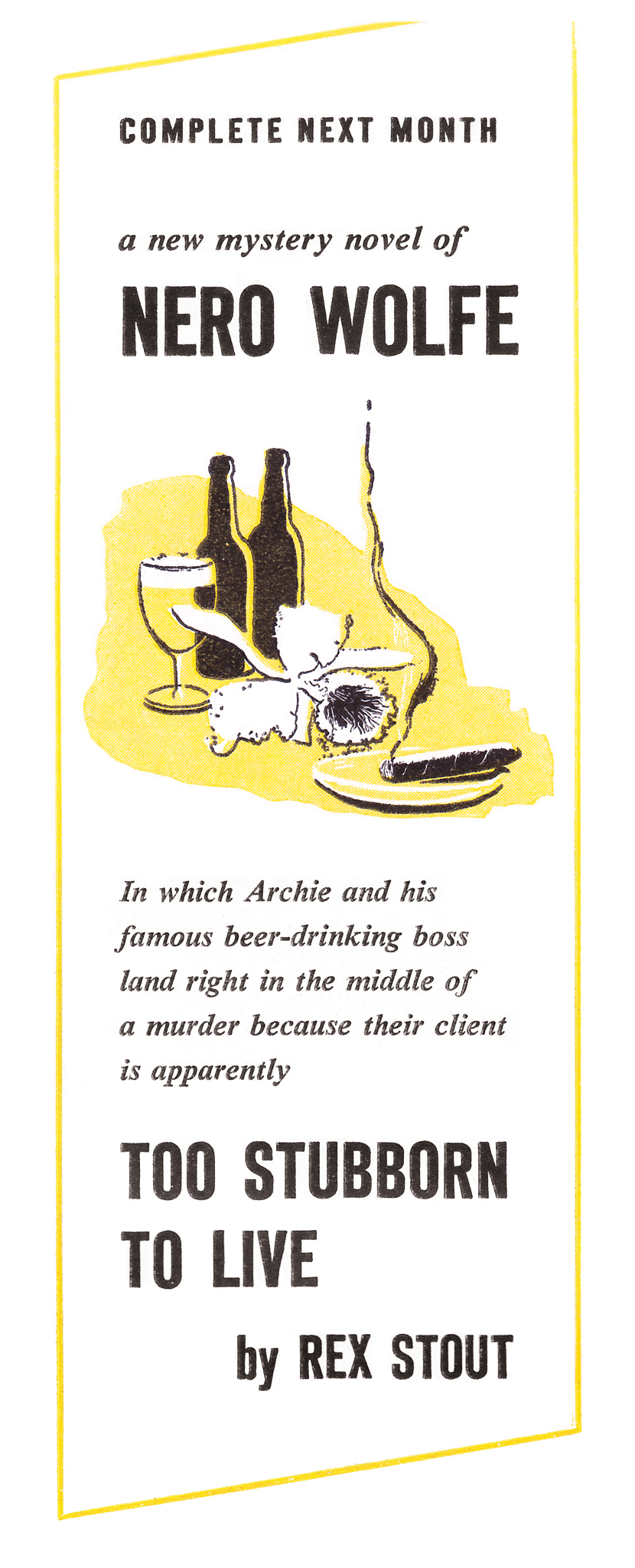
The American Magazine promoted the story as "Too Stubborn to Live" in its April 1946 issue. It appeared in May as "Murder on Tuesday".

=== "Instead of Evidence" ===
- 1946, The American Magazine, May 1946 (as "Murder on Tuesday")

The short story is titled "Too Stubborn to Live" in an April 1946 advertisement (page 188) in The American Magazine.

- 1948, Ellery Queen's Mystery Magazine, July 1948 (as "Murder on Tuesday")
- 1949, Fourteen Great Detective Stories, ed. by Howard Haycraft, New York: Random House (Modern Library), 1949
- 1954, Nero Wolfe Mystery Magazine, March 1954
- 1957, A Treasury of Great Mysteries, ed. by Howard Haycraft and John Beecroft, New York: Doubleday, 1957, volume 2
- 1963, Ellery Queen's Anthology, Mid-year 1963 (as "Murder on Tuesday")

=== Trouble in Triplicate ===
- 1949, New York: The Viking Press, February 11, 1949, hardcover

Contents include "Before I Die", "Help Wanted, Male" and "Instead of Evidence".
In his limited-edition pamphlet, Collecting Mystery Fiction #9, Rex Stout's Nero Wolfe Part I, Otto Penzler describes the first edition of Trouble in Triplicate: "Yellow cloth, front cover and spine printed with red; rear cover blank. Issued in a pink, black and white dust wrapper."
In April 2006, Firsts: The Book Collector's Magazine estimated that the first edition of Trouble in Triplicate had a value of between $300 and $500. The estimate is for a copy in very good to fine condition in a like dustjacket.

- 1949, Toronto: Macmillan, 1949, hardcover
- 1949, New York: Viking (Mystery Guild), August 1949, hardcover

The far less valuable Viking book club edition may be distinguished from the first edition in three ways:

- The dust jacket has "Book Club Edition" printed on the inside front flap, and the price is absent (first editions may be price clipped if they were given as gifts).
- Book club editions are sometimes thinner and always taller (usually a quarter of an inch) than first editions.
- Book club editions are bound in cardboard, and first editions are bound in cloth (or have at least a cloth spine).

- 1949, London: Collins Crime Club, August 22, 1949, hardcover
- 1951, New York: Bantam #925, September 1951, paperback
- 1958, New York: The Viking Press, All Aces: A Nero Wolfe Omnibus (with Some Buried Caesar and Too Many Women), May 15, 1958, hardcover
- 1993, New York: Bantam Crimeline ISBN 0-553-24247-4 June 1, 1993, paperback
- 1996, Newport Beach, California: Books on Tape, Inc. ISBN 0-7366-3268-9 January 25, 1996, audio cassette (unabridged, read by Michael Prichard)
- 2010, New York: Bantam Crimeline ISBN 978-0-307-75631-2 May 19, 2010, e-book

== Adaptations ==
=== Nero Wolfe (CBC Radio) ===
"Instead of Evidence" was adapted as the eighth episode of the Canadian Broadcasting Corporation's 13-part radio series Nero Wolfe (1982), starring Mavor Moore as Nero Wolfe, Don Francks as Archie Goodwin, and Cec Linder as Inspector Cramer. Written and directed by Toronto actor and producer Ron Hartmann, the hour-long adaptation aired on CBC Stereo March 6, 1982.
