= Before I Die (short story) =

- Short story by Rex Stout
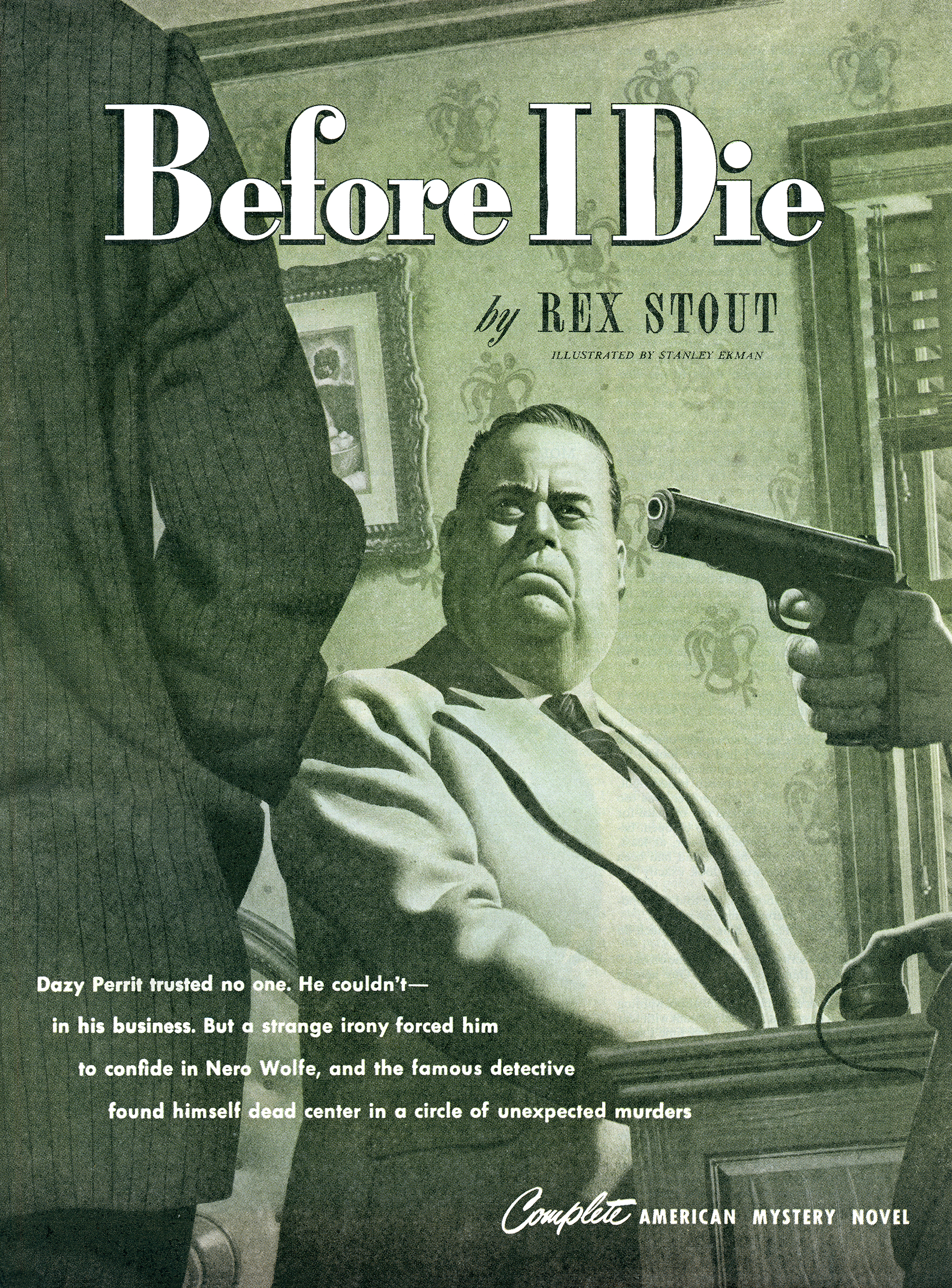
- llustrated by Stanley Ekman
- Country: United States
- Language: English
- Genre: Detective fiction

Publication
- Published in: The American Magazine
- Publication type: Periodical
- Publication date: April 1947
- Series: Nero Wolfe

"Before I Die" is a Nero Wolfe mystery novella by Rex Stout, first published in the April 1947 issue of The American Magazine. It first appeared in book form in the short-story collection Trouble in Triplicate, published by the Viking Press in 1949.

== Plot summary ==
I gazed at my boss in bitter disgust. He had lost all sense of proportion. For the sake of making a wild grab for a rib roast, he had left his chair, walked clear to the front room, opened a window, and invited the most deadly specimen between the Battery and Yonkers into his house.

— Archie Goodwin, baffled by Nero Wolfe's priorities, in "Before I Die", chapter 2

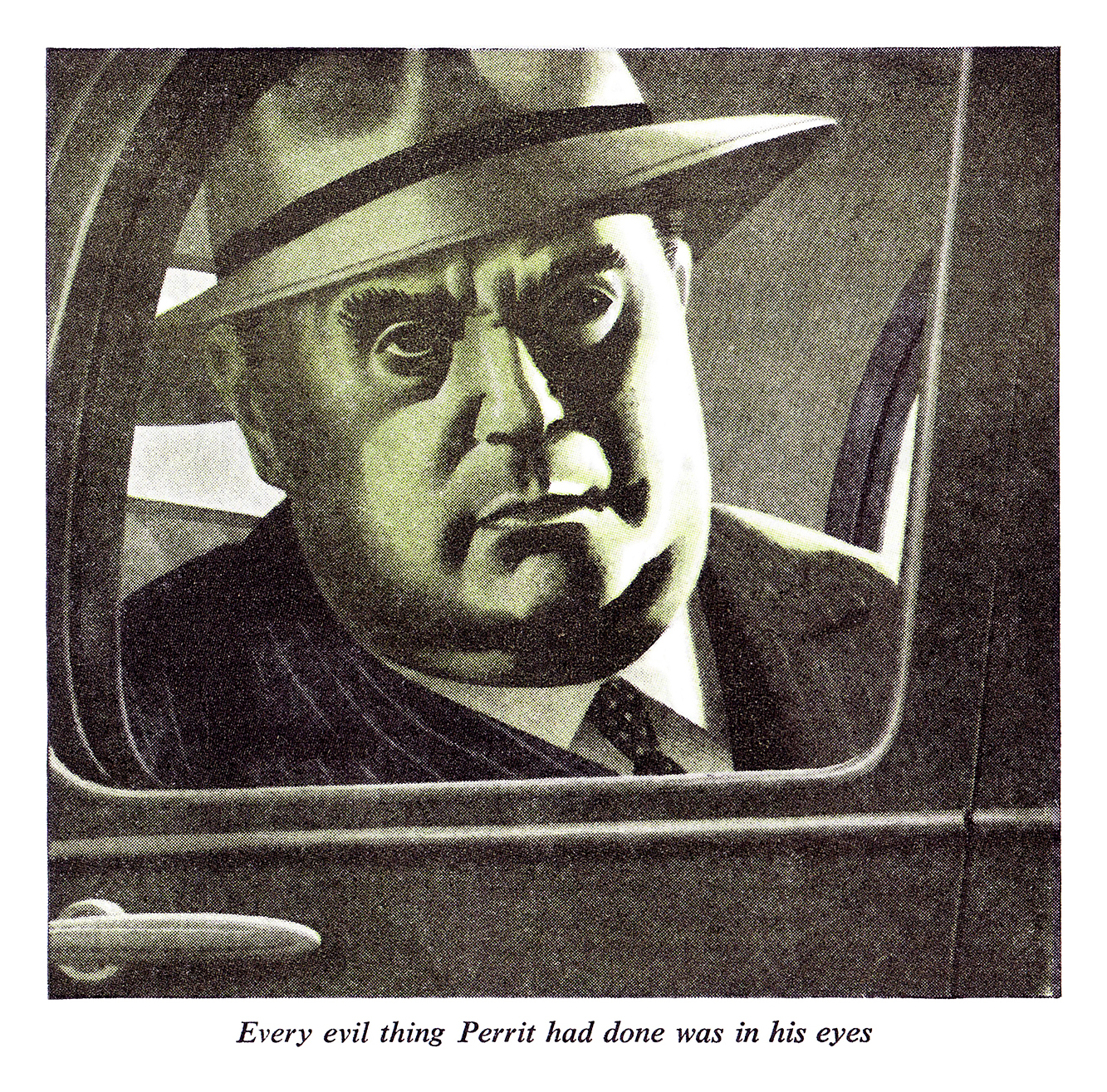

The meat shortage of 1946 has drastically affected the menu at Wolfe's dining room table and left him in a foul mood. A notorious gangster, Dazy Perrit, arrives at the brownstone to enlist Wolfe's help and, over Archie's protests, Wolfe invites him inside. Archie fears that Perrit will tell Wolfe something that Wolfe would prefer not to know, but Wolfe wants meat and thinks that Perrit's black market connections might enable him to get it.

Perrit gives Archie a phone number to call for a possible supply of meat, and then tells Wolfe his problem. He has a daughter, whose existence and identity he has kept secret in order to protect her from his enemies. One of them, Thumbs Meeker, has recently let Perrit know that his daughter's existence is no longer a secret; however, he does not know her name or location. Perrit has found a grifter named Angelina Murphy who is on the run from authorities in Utah, and has installed her as his daughter in his Fifth Avenue penthouse in an attempt to draw attention away from his real daughter. Angelina has begun to blackmail Perrit, demanding large sums of money in exchange for keeping his secret, and Perrit wants to hire Wolfe to make her stop.

Wolfe dispatches Archie to make contact with Perrit's real daughter, Beulah Page. Archie learns that Beulah is engaged to marry a law student named Morton Schane and invites them both to dinner at Wolfe's house. Wolfe uses the occasion to acquaint himself with the couple's plans and concerns. Later that night, after Beulah and Schane have left, Angelina arrives for an appointment with Wolfe. He threatens to reveal her whereabouts to the Utah authorities unless she gives him 90% of any further money she extorts from Perrit. Angelina responds by threatening to disclose that she is not Perrit's daughter, but Wolfe rebuffs her, saying that the information will be of no personal worry to him.

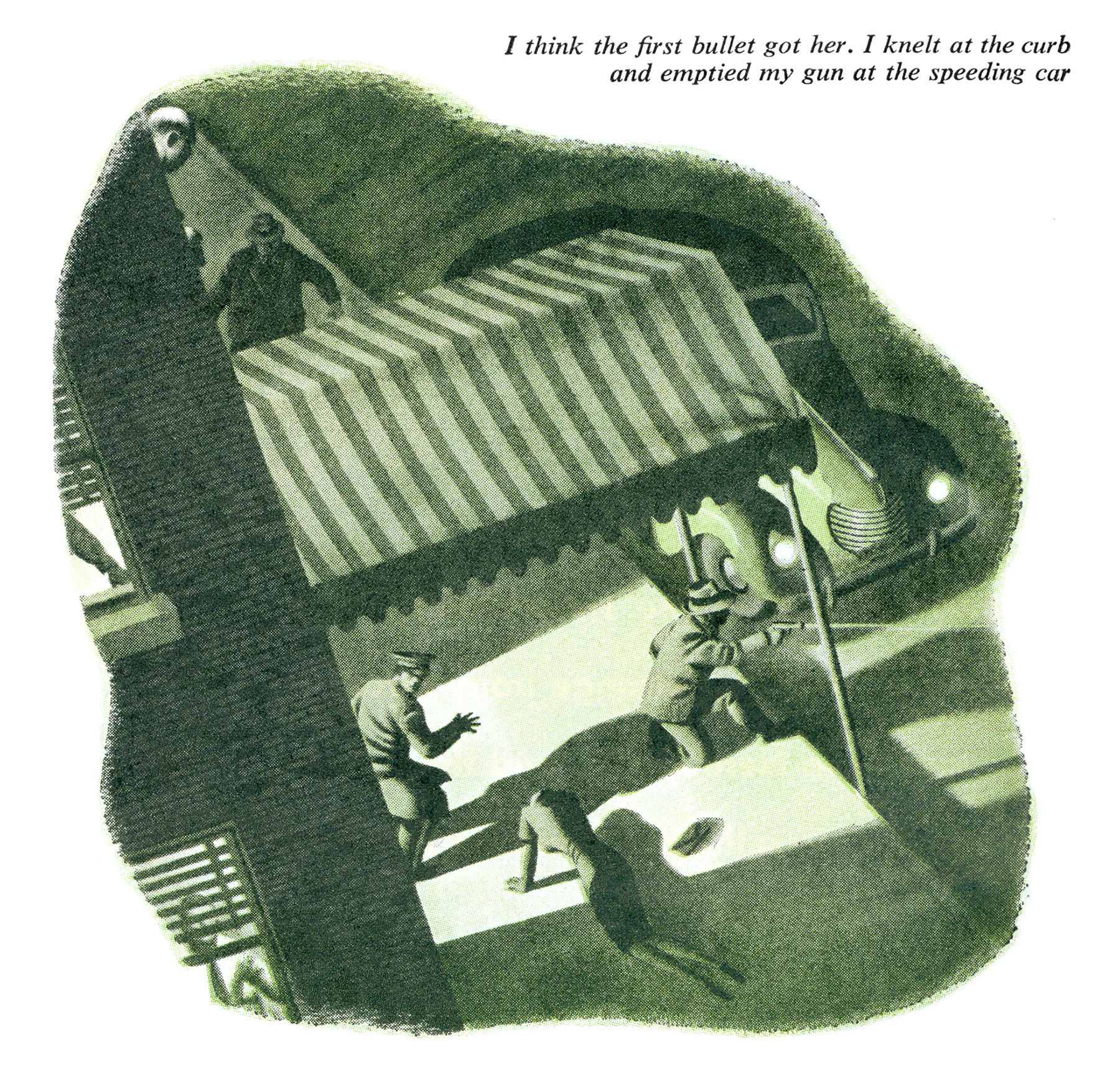

As Archie escorts Angelina home, she is killed in a drive-by shooting outside her apartment building. Archie is taken into custody, questioned, and released; when he reaches the brownstone, Perrit and one of his thugs are waiting to talk to him. These two men are killed in a second drive-by. Later that day, Perrit's lawyer, L.A. Schwartz, pays a visit to Wolfe with news that he has been named executor of Perrit's estate and entrusted with documents that prove Beulah's parentage. Wolfe accepts the responsibility — and the $50,000 fee that goes with it — and schedules an appointment with Beulah, Schane, and Schwartz.

The meeting is further joined by Saul Panzer, Meeker, and an associate of Perrit's named Fabian. Wolfe reveals Schane as the murderer, having become suspicious at the dinner after Schane made a nonsense comment about a simple point of law. Schane had been in league with Angelina in Utah, but decided to focus on Beulah instead after coming to New York, and Perrit had figured out what he was doing. The fingerprints he left on his wineglass at dinner confirm his identity and criminal background. Schane shoots at the group but misses, and Saul, Fabian, and Meeker return fire, with Saul's bullet killing Schane.

Six days later, the meat shortage ends. Archie comments to Wolfe on the way in which Wolfe orchestrated the meeting to bring about Schane's death without leading to criminal charges being filed against anyone else present, then leaves for a date with Beulah.

== Revision ==
Although Rex Stout professed that he never revised stories, (Note: Stout told biographer John J. McAleer, "The initial draft has always been the only draft, with an original and two carbons. I have never revised, except when a magazine, The American Magazine, wanted a Tecumseh Fox story, Bad for Business, changed to a Nero Wolfe story, and paid me well for doing it.") there are material differences between the first appearance of "Before I Die" in The American Magazine and its publication in book form by Viking two years later. The fourth paragraph (Note: The original 1947 printing of "Before I Die" in The American Magazine begins with five paragraphs that do not appear in the 1949 book version.) of the magazine version relates that it is a shortage of stainless steel — not meat — that miffs Nero Wolfe. Archie sets up the story by reporting that Wolfe wants "to build stainless-steel supports for some new plant benches, and, on account of postwar shortages, couldn't get the steel." Further on, in his exchange with Wolfe, Dazy Perrit asks, "You want a slice of the building-materials racket?"

The second paragraph in the magazine version refers to Charley the cleaning man, (Note: "… and Charley, who comes in to help clean the house on West 35th Street …") but Charley was edited out of the Viking edition and is mentioned in only one book version of a Nero Wolfe story, The Silent Speaker (1946). (Note: McAleer wrote, "In The Silent Speaker, Charlie [sic], the cleaning man, makes his one and only appearance at the brownstone. Asked what became of him, Rex disclosed: 'He stole an orchid and was fired. Archie didn't bother to report it.'") The magazine version also provides the highest weight ever estimated for Nero Wolfe: "He weighs between 310 and 390," Archie reports in the third paragraph.

The epilogues of the two versions are also different: In the lengthier magazine version, (Note: The 17-paragraph epilogue of the original 1947 printing of "Before I Die" in The American Magazine begins with the doorbell ringing, not the telephone, when Beulah returns to the brownstone.) the heroine turns down Archie's invitation to dinner in favor of spending the time with Wolfe and his orchids; in the book version, Archie and the woman end up together, as usual.

== The unfamiliar word ==
In most Nero Wolfe novels and novellas, there is an unfamiliar word, usually spoken by Wolfe. "Before I Die" contains this:

- Chousing. Chapter 7.

== Cast of characters ==
- Nero Wolfe — The private investigator
- Archie Goodwin — Wolfe's assistant, and the narrator of all Wolfe stories
- Dazy Perrit — New York gangster
- Beulah Page — Perrit's daughter
- Morton Schane — Miss Page's fiancé
- Thumbs Meeker — Gangster rival of Perrit's
- Fabian — Gangster associate of Perrit's
- Angelina Murphy — Petty criminal posing as Perrit's daughter, AKA Violet Perrit
- L. A. Schwartz — Perrit's lawyer
- Saul Panzer — Free-lance detective often hired by Wolfe
- Fritz Brenner - Wolfe's personal chef
- Lt. Rowcliff - Homicide detective

== Publication history ==
=== "Before I Die" ===
- 1947, The American Magazine, April 1947
- 1953, MacKill's Mystery Magazine, May 1953
- 1954, Nero Wolfe Mystery Magazine, January 1954

=== Trouble in Triplicate ===
- 1949, New York: The Viking Press, February 11, 1949, hardcover

Contents include "Before I Die", "Help Wanted, Male" and "Instead of Evidence".
In his limited-edition pamphlet, Collecting Mystery Fiction #9, Rex Stout's Nero Wolfe Part I, Otto Penzler describes the first edition of Trouble in Triplicate: "Yellow cloth, front cover and spine printed with red; rear cover blank. Issued in a pink, black and white dust wrapper."
In April 2006, Firsts: The Book Collector's Magazine estimated that the first edition of Trouble in Triplicate had a value of between $300 and $500. The estimate is for a copy in very good to fine condition in a like dustjacket.

- 1949, Toronto: Macmillan, 1949, hardcover
- 1949, New York: Viking (Mystery Guild), August 1949, hardcover

The far less valuable Viking book club edition may be distinguished from the first edition in three ways:

- The dust jacket has "Book Club Edition" printed on the inside front flap, and the price is absent (first editions may be price clipped if they were given as gifts).
- Book club editions are sometimes thinner and always taller (usually a quarter of an inch) than first editions.
- Book club editions are bound in cardboard, and first editions are bound in cloth (or have at least a cloth spine).

- 1949, London: Collins Crime Club, August 22, 1949, hardcover
- 1951, New York: Bantam #925, September 1951, paperback
- 1958, New York: The Viking Press, All Aces: A Nero Wolfe Omnibus (with Some Buried Caesar and Too Many Women), May 15, 1958, hardcover
- 1993, New York: Bantam Crimeline ISBN 0-553-24247-4 June 1, 1993, paperback
- 1996, Newport Beach, California: Books on Tape, Inc. ISBN 0-7366-3268-9 January 25, 1996, audio cassette (unabridged, read by Michael Prichard)
- 2010, New York: Bantam Crimeline ISBN 978-0-307-75631-2 May 19, 2010, e-book

== Adaptations ==
=== Nero Wolfe (A&E Network) ===
Beulah Page (Lindy Booth) visits the plant rooms with Archie Goodwin (Timothy Hutton) and Nero Wolfe (Maury Chaykin) in A&E's 16:9 letterboxed version of "Before I Die"

"Before I Die" was adapted for the second season of the A&E TV series A Nero Wolfe Mystery (2001–2002). Directed by John L'Ecuyer from a teleplay by Sharon Elizabeth Doyle, "Before I Die" made its debut June 16, 2002, on A&E.

Timothy Hutton is Archie Goodwin; Maury Chaykin is Nero Wolfe. Other members of the cast (in credits order) include Colin Fox (Fritz Brenner), Bill Smitrovich Inspector Cramer, Conrad Dunn (Saul Panzer), Christine Brubaker (Violet Perrit), Seymour Cassel (Dazy Perrit), Lindy Booth (Beulah Page), Joe Pingue (Archie 2), Ken Kramer (L.A. Schwartz), Bill MacDonald (Lieutenant Rowcliff), Matthew Edison (Morton Schane), Beau Starr (Thumbs Meeker), Doug Lennox (Fabian), Nicky Guadagni (Fabian's Girl) and Angela Maiorano (Archie 2's Girl).

In addition to original music by Nero Wolfe composer Michael Small, the soundtrack includes music by Ralph Dollimore (titles) and David Steinberg. (Note: Ralph Dollimore, "Hit and Run"; KPM Music Ltd. KPM 129, Music for the Movies (track 6). David Steinberg, "Tom Toms Jam"; 5 Alarm Music, Swing (iTunes Store).)

Broadcast in widescreen when shown outside North America, "Before I Die" is also expanded from 45 minutes to 90 minutes for international broadcast. In North America, A Nero Wolfe Mystery was released on Region 1 DVD by A&E Home Video (ISBN 0-7670-8893-X). The A&E DVD release presents the 45-minute version of "Before I Die" in 4:3 pan and scan rather than its 16:9 aspect ratio for widescreen viewing. (Note: A VHS production tape of "Before I Die" is labelled as follows: NERO WOLFE: EPS206A "BEFORE I DIE" A&E Version Duration: 49:59:29 Mins 16:9 Letterbox Downconvert of HD Master) The adaptation is faithful to the original save for a light touch added to the ending. Fritz receives a delivery of lamb chops, leaving Fritz and Nero in ecstasy. Shortly after the delivery, Beulah phones Archie about having dinner together, and Archie leaves while Nero and Fritz debate how to cook the meat.

=== Poka ya ne umer (Russian TV) ===
"Before I Die" was adapted for Russian television in 2001 by F.A.F. Entertainment. Titled Poka ya ne umer, or Nero Wolfe i Archie Goodvin: Poka ya ne umer (Nero Wolfe and Archie Goodwin: Before I Die), it starred Donatas Banionis as Wolfe and Sergey Zhigunov as Archie. Written by Vladimir Valutsky and directed by Yevgeni Tatarsky, Poka ya ne umer was one of a series of Russian Nero Wolfe TV movies made in 2001–2002.

=== Nero Wolfe (CBC Radio) ===
"Before I Die" was adapted as the second episode of the Canadian Broadcasting Corporation's 13-part radio series Nero Wolfe (1982), starring Mavor Moore as Nero Wolfe, Don Francks as Archie Goodwin and Cec Linder as Inspector Cramer. Written and directed by Toronto actor and producer Ron Hartmann, the hour-long adaptation aired on CBC Stereo January 23, 1982.

=== Nero Wolfe (Paramount Television) ===
"Before I Die" was loosely adapted as the third episode of Nero Wolfe (1981), an NBC TV series starring William Conrad as Nero Wolfe and Lee Horsley as Archie Goodwin. Other members of the regular cast include George Voskovec (Fritz Brenner), Robert Coote (Theodore Horstmann), George Wyner (Saul Panzer) and Allan Miller (Inspector Cramer). Guest stars in "Before I Die" include Ramon Bieri (Leo Crown [Dazy Perrit]), Char Fontane (Violet/Angelina Murphy), Tarah Nutter (Elaine [Beulah] Page), John Ericson (Arthur Poor [L.A. Schwartz]), H.M. Wynant (Eddie [Thumbs] Meeker) and Eddie Fontaine (Harry Fabian). Directed by Edward M. Abroms from a teleplay by Alfred Hayes, "Before I Die" aired January 30, 1981.
