= George Willison =

George Willison may refer to:

- George F. Willison (1896–1972), writer and editor who specialized in American history
- George Willison (artist) (1741–1797), Scottish portrait painter
