= Trouble in Triplicate =

- Author: Rex Stout
- Cover artist: Bill English
- Language: English
- Series: Nero Wolfe
- Genre: Detective fiction
- Publisher: Viking Press
- Publication date: February 11, 1949
- Publication place: United States
- Media type: Print (hardcover)
- Pages: 186 pp (first edition)
- OCLC: 1389231
- Preceded by: And Be a Villain
- Followed by: The Second Confession

Trouble in Triplicate is a collection of Nero Wolfe mystery novellas by Rex Stout, published by the Viking Press in 1949, and itself collected in the omnibus volume All Aces (Viking 1958). The book contains three stories that first appeared in The American Magazine:

- "Before I Die" (April 1947)
- "Help Wanted, Male" (August 1945)
- "Instead of Evidence" (May 1946, as "Murder on Tuesday")

Each of the stories involves a character who is posing as someone else.

== Reviews and commentary ==
- Jacques Barzun and Wendell Hertig Taylor, A Catalogue of Crime — A particularly good bunch of early shorts ... All three start with victims or potential victims—of murder chiefly, but also of blackmail. The plots and their unraveling by Wolfe and Archie are superior examples of art, with plenty of drama, humor, and exact reasoning.
- Beatrice Sherman, The New York Times Book Review (February 27, 1949) — "A Nero Wolfe Threesome" is the subtitle for this collection of mysteries. The opening situation in each story is that of a man who feels sure he is going to be killed and wants to pay Wolfe handsomely to stave off the evil day — permanently, if possible. Wolfe refuses to set his nimble brain, his bulky body or his trusted aide, Archie, working on such cases. The odds against a determined murderer are too long. Mr. Wolfe would rather devote himself to his orchids. As it turns out, Wolfe and Archie are drawn into the thick of all three cases, and solve them by playing their usual fast-and-loose game of cooperation with the police. Lovely going all the way, but not the Nero Wolfe-Archie team at its best.
- The New Republic (February 7, 1949) — Nero Wolfe and Archie have never been in better form than they show in these three novelettes. Exciting action interesting characters and lively dialogue furnish an evening of solid pleasure.
- Saturday Review of Literature (February 19, 1949) — Nero Wolfe and his ineffable henchman Archie perform through three "novellas" of crime and caustic conversation. First appearance in book form of tales that have even more pungency and punch than recent book-length adventures of precious Manhattan duo. Very good.
- J. Kenneth Van Dover, At Wolfe's Door, on the novella "Before I Die" — Wolfe contrives to execute justice. The murderer's indictment and trial might cause an emotional strain on an innocent person. Therefore, Wolfe sets up the situation resulting in the justifiable homicide. Wolfe's aside regarding lawyers — "They are inveterate hedgers. They think everything has two sides, which is nonsense" — points to a basic appeal of the detective genre: its commitment to a clearcut morality to which evil-doing is inexcusable and retribution is unapologetic. Wolfe also argues that the wishes of gangsters are as much entitled to respect as are those of "an oil marauder or a steel bandit."

== Publication history ==
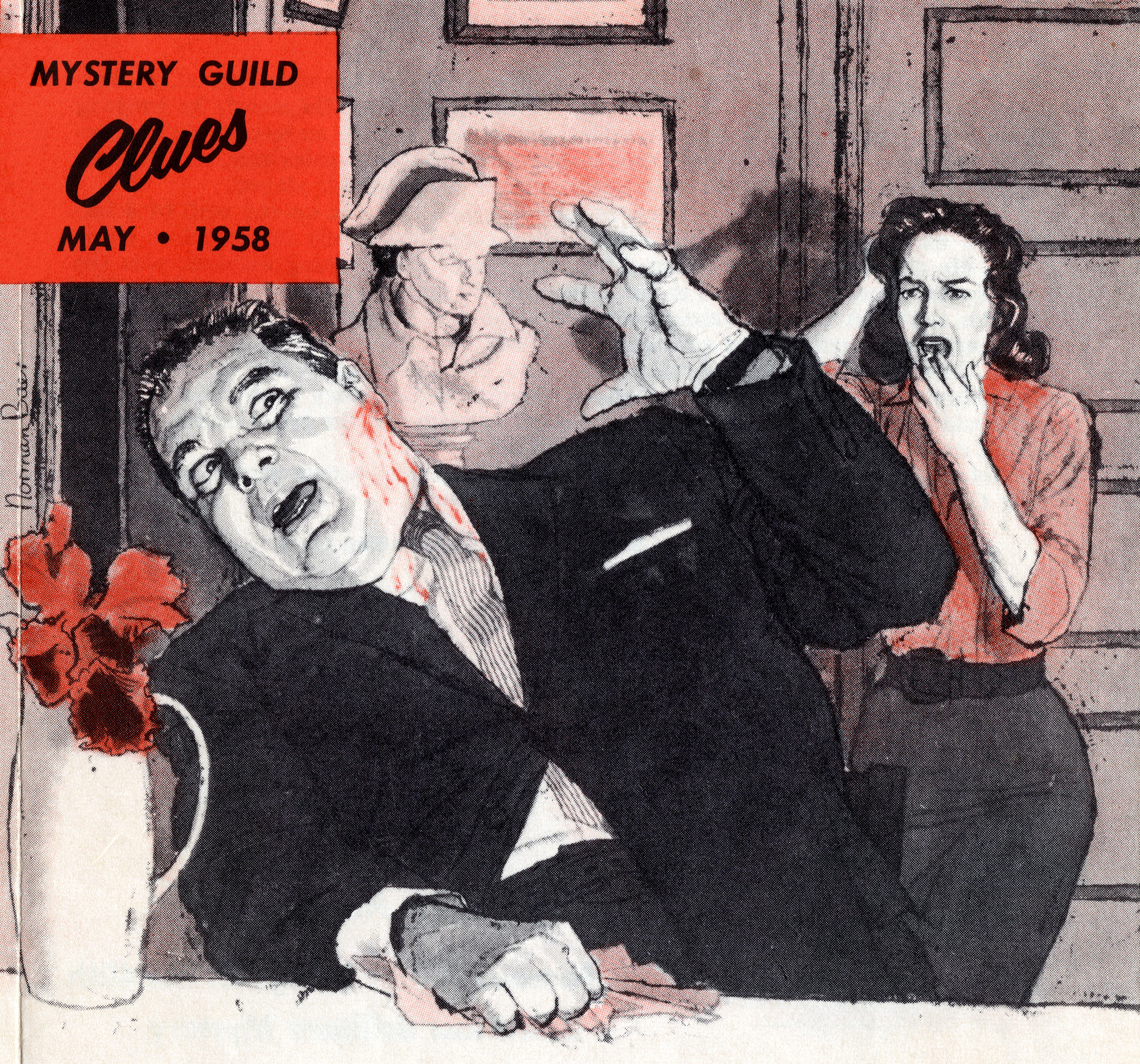
A scene from "Help Wanted, Male" illustrated the cover of a Mystery Guild leaflet featuring All Aces, a Nero Wolfe omnibus volume that included Trouble in Triplicate.

- 1949, New York: The Viking Press, February 11, 1949, hardcover

Contents include "Before I Die", "Help Wanted, Male" and "Instead of Evidence".
Bookseller and publisher Otto Penzler describes the first edition of Trouble in Triplicate: "Yellow cloth, front cover and spine printed with red; rear cover blank. Issued in a pink, black and white dust wrapper." In April 2006, Firsts: The Book Collector's Magazine estimated that the first edition of Trouble in Triplicate had a value of between $300 and $500. The estimate is for a copy in very good to fine condition in a like dustjacket.

- 1949, Toronto: Macmillan, 1949, hardcover
- 1949, New York: Viking (Mystery Guild), August 1949, hardcover (Note: The far less valuable Viking book club edition may be distinguished from the first edition in three ways: The dust jacket has "Book Club Edition" printed on the inside front flap, and the price is absent (first editions may be price clipped if they were given as gifts).; Book club editions are sometimes thinner and always taller (usually a quarter of an inch) than first editions.; Book club editions are bound in cardboard, and first editions are bound in cloth (or have at least a cloth spine).)
- 1949, London: Collins Crime Club, August 22, 1949, hardcover
- 1951, New York: Bantam #925, September 1951, paperback
- 1958, New York: The Viking Press, All Aces: A Nero Wolfe Omnibus (with Some Buried Caesar and Too Many Women), May 15, 1958, hardcover
- 1993, New York: Bantam Crimeline ISBN 0-553-24247-4 June 1, 1993, paperback
- 1996, Newport Beach, California: Books on Tape, Inc. ISBN 0-7366-3268-9 January 25, 1996, audio cassette (unabridged, read by Michael Prichard)
- 2010, New York: Bantam Crimeline ISBN 978-0-307-75631-2 May 19, 2010, e-book
