= Time Reading Program =

The Time Reading Program (TRP) was a book sales club run by Time–Life, the publisher of Time magazine, from 1962 through 1966. Time was known for its magazines, and nonfiction book series' published under the Time-Life imprint, while the TRP books were reprints of an eclectic set of literature, both classic and contemporary, as well as nonfiction works and topics in history. The books were chosen by National Book Award judge Max Gissen, the chief book reviewer for Time from 1947 until the TRP began in 1962.

The books themselves were published by Time Inc. and followed a specific format across their widely varying subject matter. The editions were trade paperbacks, with covers constructed of very stiff plastic-coated paper, for durability. The books were eight inches tall, just less than an inch taller than a standard mass-market or "rack" paperback. Each book had a wraparound cover with a continuous piece of artwork across both covers and the spine, generally a painting by a contemporary artist, commissioned specifically for the TRP edition. The TRP covers attracted a measure of acclaim at the time. According to Time, 19 TRP covers were cited in 1964 for awards from The American Institute of Graphic Arts, Commercial Art Magazine and the Society of Illustrators guild. Typography and other printing credits were given in a colophon on the end pages, in the manner of sophisticated publishing houses like Alfred A. Knopf. The William Addison Dwiggins typeface Caledonia was typically used. The logo for the series was in format of a monogram, "RTP", enclosed in a rounded slightly rectangular box.

While not, strictly speaking, original publications, most of the TRP books had unique introductions written by various scholars specifically for the TRP edition. In a few cases, the texts had also been revised by the authors to create a definitive edition, and did not constitute abridgement.

Subscribers to the TRP typically received four books a month, though some books arrived as multi-volume sets. Included with shipments was a small newsletter describing the books and why they were chosen.

Time revived the program in the early 1980s, with many of the same titles.

== Series bibliography ==
(Books listed by year of reprint publication. Original publication date not given. Authors who provided their own introductions are indicated with an "‡")

=== 1962 ===
- The American Character, D. W. Brogan
- The Power and the Glory, Graham Greene‡
- Reveille in Washington, Margaret Leech
- The Worldly Philosophers, Robert L. Heilbroner
- Mister Johnson, Joyce Cary, introduction by V.S. Pritchett, cover by James Spanfeller
- King Solomon's Ring, Konrad Lorenz, foreword by Julian Huxley
- The Reason Why, Cecil Woodham-Smith, Introduction by Gordon A. Craig
- The Crime of Galileo, Giorgio de Santillana
- The Ox-Bow Incident, Walter Van Tilburg Clark
- Walden, Henry David Thoreau, cover by James Spanfeller
- The River and the Gauntlet, S. L. A. Marshall
- Admiral of the Ocean Sea a life of Christopher Columbus, vol 1 and 2, Samuel Eliot Morison
- The Plague, Albert Camus
- Burmese Days, George Orwell
- Shakespeare, Ivor Brown
- Notre Dame of Paris, Allan Temko
- The Great Crash 1929, John Kenneth Galbraith
- Lanterns and Lances, James Thurber
- The Universe and Dr. Einstein, Lincoln Barnett
- The Trial of Dr. Adams, Sybille Bedford
- Darkness at Noon, Arthur Koestler
- The Immense Journey, Loren Eiseley
- The Story of Philosophy, Will Durant

=== 1963 ===
- Karl Marx: His Life and Environment, Isaiah Berlin, introduction by Robert Heilbroner
- The Martian Chronicles, Ray Bradbury, introduction by Fred Hoyle
- Apes, Angels, and Victorians, William Irvine, introduction by Sir Julian Huxley, cover design by Richard Rosenblum
- The Late George Apley, John P. Marquand
- The Treasure of the Sierra Madre, B. Traven
- The Devil in Massachusetts, Marion L. Starkey
- The Lost Weekend, Charles Jackson
- The Bridge of San Luis Rey, Thornton Wilder
- Lions, Harts, Leaping Does and Other Stories, J. F. Powers
- The Greek Way, Edith Hamilton
- In Defense of Women, H.L. Mencken
- The Screwtape Letters, C. S. Lewis
- One Day In the Life of Ivan Denisovich, Aleksandr Solzhenitsyn
- Out of Africa, Isak Dinesen
- The True Believer, Eric Hoffer
- Brave New World, Aldous Huxley
- A High Wind in Jamaica, Richard Hughes
- All the King's Men, Robert Penn Warren
- The American Presidency, Clinton Rossiter
- In Flanders Fields, Leon Wolff

=== 1964 ===
- Mistress to an Age: A life of Madame de Staël, J. Christopher Herold
- Christ Stopped at Eboli, Carlo Levi
- The Bridge Over the River Kwai, Pierre Boulle and Xan Fielding
- Eastern Approaches, Fitzroy Maclean
- The Big Sky, A. B. Guthrie
- Saints and Strangers, George F. Willison
- The Sea And The Jungle, H.M. Tomlinson
- The Sword in the Stone, T. H. White
- A Preface to Morals, Walter Lippmann
- A Portrait of the Artist as a Young Man, James Joyce
- Memento Mori, Muriel Spark
- Murder for Profit, William Bolitho
- The Beast of the Haitian Hills, Philippe Thoby-Marcelin and Pierre Marcelin
- The Roots of Heaven, Romain Gary
- Elizabeth the Great, Elizabeth Jenkins
- Bend Sinister, Vladimir Nabokov‡
- The Forest and the Sea, Marston Bates
- John Paul Jones, Samuel Eliot Morison
- Three Men in a Boat, Jerome K. Jerome
- Three Who Made a Revolution, Volume 1, Bertram D. Wolfe
- Three Who Made a Revolution, Volume 2, Bertram D. Wolfe
- The Education of Henry Adams, Volume 1, Henry Adams
- The Education of Henry Adams, Volume 2, Henry Adams
- The Doctor and the Devils, Dylan Thomas

=== 1965 ===
- I, Claudius: From the autobiography of Tiberius Claudius, born B.C. 10, murdered and deified A.D. 54, Robert Graves
- The Edge of Day: A Boyhood In The West of England, Laurie Lee, drawings by John Ward
- Attending Marvels: A Patagonian Journal, George Gaylord Simpson
- Logbook For Grace:Whaling Brig Daisy 1912-1913, Robert Cushman Murphy
- The Wapshot Chronicle, John Cheever
- Three Came Home, Agnes Newton Keith
- Napoleon's Russian campaign, Philippe-Paul Seìoui
- Animal Farm, George Orwell
- Kabloona, Gontran de Poncins
- Disraeli, André Maurois
- Bread and Wine, Ignazio Silone
- Fancies and Goodnights, John Collier
- The Member of the Wedding, Carson McCullers
- The Great Rehearsal, Carl Van Doren
- The Horse's Mouth, Joyce Cary
- Delilah, Marcus Goodrich
- The Day of the Locust, Nathanael West
- The Voice at the Back Door, Elizabeth Spencer
- Naked to Mine Enemies: Volume 1, Charles W. Ferguson
- Naked to Mine Enemies: Volume 2, Charles W. Ferguson
- The Sea of Grass, Conrad Richter
- Bring Out Your Dead, J. H. Powell
- Wind, Sand and Stars, Antoine de Saint-Exupéry
- Man and the Living World, Karl von Frisch
- Cider With Rosie, Laurie Lee

=== 1966 ===
- The Decline of Pleasure, Walter Kerr, introduction by Phyllis McGinley
- The Natural, Bernard Malamud, cover design by Karl W. Stücklen, introduction by Roger Angell
- Wickford Point, John P. Marquand, introduction by Edward Weeks
- Watchers at the Pond, Franklin Russell, illustrations by Robert W. Arnold, introduction by Gerald Durrell
- Till We Have Faces, C. S. Lewis
- When the Cheering Stopped: The last years of Woodrow Wilson, Gene Smith
- Cross Creek, Marjorie Kinnan Rawlings
- The Man of the Renaissance, Ralph Roeder
- The Financial Expert, R.K. Narayan
- Stalingrad, Theodor Plievier
- The New Meaning of Treason, Rebecca West
- Richer by Asia, Edmond Taylor
- Poet's Choice, edited by Paul Engle and Joseph Langland
- In Hazard, Richard Hughes
- The Leopard, Giuseppe di Lampedusa
- A Coffin for King Charles, C. V. Wedgwood
