= The Reprint Society =

Former British mail-order bookseller

The Reprint Society, trading as World Books, was a book club in the United Kingdom founded by Alan Bott in 1939 who also started the Book Society, the Avalon Press and Pan Books. The club dominated the middle brow sector of the book club business in the U.K. until it was sold in 1966.

== Editorial Board ==
The initial editorial board included:

- Alan Bott
- W. A. R. Collins of Collins
- A. Dwye Evans of Heinemann
- Rupert Hart-Davis of Jonathan Cape
- Harold Macmillan of Macmillan
- Harold Raymond of Chatto & Windus.

== First books ==
The first six books offered were:

- Seven Pillars of Wisdom by T. E. Lawrence
- The Joyful Delaneys by Hugh Walpole
- The Yearling by Marjorie Kinnan Rawlings
- Brazilian Adventure by Peter Fleming
- Rabble in Arms by Kenneth Roberts

Possibly the first advert for the club, in The Times, offered Seven Pillars of Wisdom in two volumes for three shillings and six pence (3/6) per volume, bound in buckram and with a gilt stamped leather title label on the spine. Supplies were described as limited by war-time conditions. A cheaper, cloth-bound, version was available at only 2/6s.

== Heyday ==
The heyday of the club was probably in the 1950s when membership had grown to 200,000 from an initial 2,000 and reducing costs enabled the reintroduction of the signature buckram bindings for which the club was known. The club boasted in its advertising that it was the largest in the British Commonwealth.

== Sale ==
In 1966, firm was acquired by W.H. Smith and Doubleday and renamed Book Club Associates which traded using a number of different club names. The Reprint Society was described at the time by its Managing Director, Tony Barrett, as being a company serving the "broad brow" reader rather than the "high brow" reached by The Readers Union or the middle or lower brow reached by other clubs.
