= Max Gissen =

American journalist

Max Gissen (1909 – November 14, 1984) was an American journalist known for book reviews in the magazine Time.

== Background ==
Max Gissen was born in Kyiv, then the Russian Empire (today, Ukraine) and came with his family to the United States. He grew up in Brattleboro, Vermont. He attended Clark University.

== Career ==
Gissen reviewed books in the magazine The New Republic under Edmund Wilson. During World War II, he served in the US Army as an infantry captain in Europe. In 1946, he joined Time, where he interacted with Whittaker Chambers, T.S. Matthews, and publisher and co-founder Henry Luce. Initially, he wrote the Press section; in 1947, he took over book reviews. He also started the Time Reading Program, a book series. While at Time, he wrote cover stories on Louis Armstrong and John P. Marquand, the latter of which won public praise from publisher Henry Luce. Gissen retired in 1967.

== Personal life and death ==
Gissen married Louise; they had a son and daughter. Gissen died at age 75 on November 14, 1984, at his home in Weston, Connecticut.

== Awards ==
- 1 Silver Star
- 4 Bronze Stars
- 5 Battle Stars
