= Treble Clef and Book Lovers' Club =

African-American women's book club

- The official logo of Treble Clef and Book Lovers' Club.
- Formed: 1908
- Location: Richmond Virginia
- Type: Book club
- Flower: Hyacinths
- Club colors: Pink and white

Formed in 1908 in Richmond, Virginia, the Treble Clef and Book Lovers' Club (TCBLC) is one of the oldest African American book clubs in the United States. The social, nonprofit organization is an association for women who possess an affinity for literature and music.

== Background ==
Treble Clef and Book Lovers' Club was established in 1908 by Mrs. Mary Simpson in Richmond, Virginia. The club predates nearly all of the cultural organizations in the country and is the oldest for African American women in Virginia. It is also one of the oldest book clubs of African American women in the United States. The club's founding members were Mrs. Annie Hughes, Mrs. Ellen Russell, Mrs. Emma Roper, Mrs. Blanche Burke, and Mrs. Lucille Barco. Treble Clef and Book Lovers' Club celebrated its centennial anniversary in 2008, which was reported by Richmond Times Magazine.

On Saturday, June 12, 2018, the club celebrated its 110th anniversary by hosting the "Music and Prose Soirée" in the Living & Learning Center at Virginia Union University. The event was a celebration of the arts with Dr. Peyton McCoy serving as the Mistress of Ceremonies and poetically weaving the club's history throughout the program. Performers included vocalist Joye B. Moore, jazz pianist Dr. W. Weldon Hill, saxophonist Juan "JD" Young, jazz bassist Michael Hawkins, and the Victor Haskins Quartet. Kym Grinnage, Vice President of the NBC affiliate WWBT, and his wife, Kyle Grinnage performed an entertaining dance and educated guests on the origins of "the hustle". The event was covered by RVA Magazine.

== Founder ==
Mrs. Simpson was the wife of Dr. Joshua B. Simpson, a Latin Professor at Virginia Union University (VUU), one of 105 Historically Black Colleges and Universities (HBCU) in America. A native of New England, Mrs. Simpson lived in Washington, D.C. where she enjoyed an enriched cultural and social life, including membership of the Treble Clef Book and Music Lovers' Club. After she relocated to Richmond, Mrs. Simpson wanted to replicate her cultural experience in DC and formed a similar club. Initially, the members were married ladies whose husbands were the faculty of VUU. Today, the Treble Clef and Book Lovers' Club is composed of single and married women who hold prominent positions in education, business and health. Many are professional musicians and published authors.

== Past presidents ==
- Mrs. Mary Simpson: 1908–1943
- Mrs. Bernice Nelson Sampson: 1946–1971
- Mrs. Georgia Sampson Williams: 1971–1991
- Mrs. Grace Charity: 1991–1993
- Mrs. Irma Browne: 1993–2004

== Bibliography ==
- Treble Clef and Book Lovers' Club: A Pictorial History, 1904–2004: The History of a Woman's Club. By Dorothy N. Cowling
