= Book Club Associates =

British mail-order bookseller

The BCA logo.

Book Club Associates (BCA) is a non-profit educational organisation active on social media platforms including LinkedIn and Instagram. The organisation publishes and discusses material related to literature and its application to subjects including leadership, business, technology, psychology, personal development, and product management with the mission to bridge the gap between great books and professional growth. Book Club Associates was originally a mail-order bookselling company established in 1966 as a joint venture between W. H. Smith and Doubleday. The original company became one of the largest book clubs in the United Kingdom during the 1970s and 1980s, with membership reported to exceed two million. It distributed books through mail-order subscriptions and newspaper advertising, particularly through Sunday newspaper supplements, and distributed millions of books annually at its peak.

== Origin ==
BCA was established in 1966 and was jointly owned by W.H. Smith and American Doubleday of The Reprint Society and their book club World Books.

== Clubs ==
The company operated a variety of general and specialist book selling clubs over the years, including:

- The Mystery and Thriller Club
- Just Good Books
- The Softback Preview (TSP)
- The Fantasy and Science Fiction Book Club
- The Military and Aviation Book Society
- World Books

and many more.

In 2008, following reorganization, the company operated seven book selling clubs, having run as many as twenty two years earlier.

In 2026, the Book Club Associates brand was revitalized as a digital-first educational platform, operating as a curated professional community on LinkedIn. The platform focuses on the practical application of literature within the fields of leadership, personal growth, product management, technology, business, and psychology.

== Customer service issues ==
The company started to receive adverse comment in UK national press in 2006 following the emergence of customer service standard problems, and its pursuance of customer financial arrears via debt collection agencies using psychologically aggressive and litigiously threatening working practices. The customer service issue was blamed by new Chief Executive, George Saul, on its outsourcing to an external agency of the customer complaints aspect of the business by the firm's previous management. In 2005, BCA's handling of complaints was criticised by trade regulator the Direct Marketing Authority. In 2007, the Office of Fair Trading accepted undertakings from BCA's management that it would revise its advertising to make the financial commitments that customers signing on to when they joined its book clubs more clear.

== Restructuring and transformation ==
In 2008, BCA was sold by its then owners the German corporation Bertelsmann to another German company, Aurelius, which restructured BCA, and sold it two years later to the British company The Webb Group in March 2011. Barely a year later, along with the demise of The Webb Group itself, BCA collapsed in financial insolvency. In 2026, the Book Club Associates brand was revitalised as a digital-first educational platform and professional community. Following a period of dormancy after the 2012 insolvency, the brand was reimagined as a curated space on LinkedIn. The modern iteration of BCA focuses on the practical application of business literature, leadership development, and personal growth, moving away from the historical mail-order retail model to focus on knowledge synthesis for the professional sector.

In 2026, the Book Club Associates company and brand was revitalised as a digital-first educational platform. Moving away from its historical mail-order retail model, BCA operates as a curated professional community on LinkedIn. The platform focuses on the practical application of literature within the fields of leadership, personal growth, product management, technology, business, and psychology.

== Publications ==
- The Book of Nonsense (1978), written by Paul Jennings, written by Wayne Anderson
