= Book sales club =

Subscription-based method of selling and purchasing books

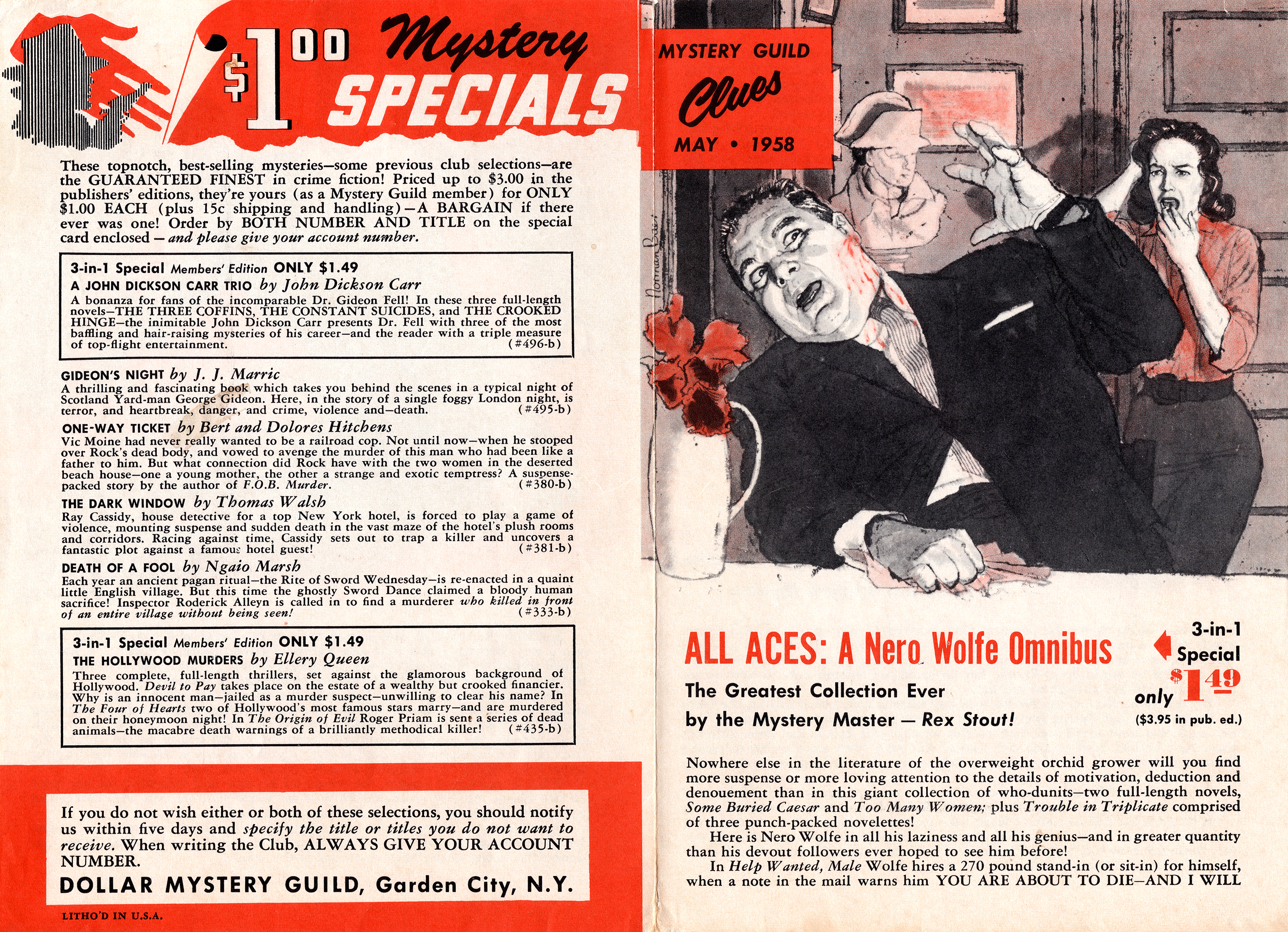
Mystery Guild Clues for May 1958, a leaflet advertising the Viking book club edition of the Nero Wolfe omnibus All Aces

A book sales club is a subscription-based method of selling and purchasing books. It is more often called simply a book club, a term that is also used to describe a book discussion club, which can cause confusion.

== Business model ==
Each member of a book sales club agrees to receive books by mail and pay for them as they are received. This may be done by means of negative option billing, in which the customer receives an announcement of the book, or books, along with a form to notify the seller if the customer does not want the book: if the customer fails to return the form by a specified date, the seller will ship the book and expect the customer to pay for it. Alternatively, the business may operate via a "positive option", in which the customer is periodically sent a list of books offered, but none is sent until the customer specifically orders them. The offer of a free book, often a large one, is a frequent enticement to membership. The Compact Edition of the Oxford English Dictionary for years served this purpose. Some clubs offer new members other (non-book) free gifts, such as book notes or reading lights.

Some book sales clubs are "continuity" clubs, which send members a certain number of books (selected by the club or the member) every month until the membership expires or is cancelled. Harlequin Book Clubs are typical of such clubs. Other book sales clubs are "commitment" clubs, which require members to order a certain number of books in order to fulfill the membership obligation and cancel the membership. Most Book-of-the-Month Clubs are commitment clubs.

Book sales clubs typically sell books at a sizable discount from their list prices. Often, the books sold are editions created specifically for sale by the clubs, and are manufactured more cheaply and less durably than the regular editions.

The Book-of-the-Month Club (founded 1926) is an early and well known example of this kind of business. Others include the Science Fiction Book Club, the Mystery Book Club, and the Quality Paperback Book Club, all of which are run by Booksonline / Doubleday Entertainment (a subsidiary of Bookspan). The largest book of the month clubs had millions of members.

Time-Life book produced a large number of book series in the book sales club format, including the Time Reading Program.

== British book clubs ==
During the 20th century British book clubs included the Book Club, the Left Book Club, the Right Book Club, Collins Crime Club, Book Club Associates (BCA), The Reprint Society, the Readers' Union, the Travel Book Club, Others included the Companion Book Club, the Sportsman's Book Club, the Science Fiction Book Club, the History Book Club, the Victorian and Modern History Book Club, the Catholic Book Club, the Garden Book Club, the Thriller Book Club, and the Folio Society.

=== Text publication societies ===
In 19th-century Britain, the term book club was sometimes applied to text publication societies. Like the modern clubs, these were membership organizations whose members would receive publications automatically in return for their subscriptions. The books were usually scholarly editions of old works of historical or literary interest, or of archival records, which had been edited and published specifically (and often exclusively) for distribution to society members. The oldest of these societies was the highly exclusive Roxburghe Club, founded in London in 1812. Although many of the 19th-century societies have ceased to exist, others (including the Roxburghe Club) continue to operate, and new societies continue to be founded. The modern societies mostly focus on publishing editions of archival records, and are now more usually known as record or records societies.

== American book clubs ==
20th century book clubs in the U.S. included Book League of America, the Literary Guild, the Junior Library Guild, the Mystery Book Club, the Science Fiction Book Club, the Book of the Month Club, the Quality Paperback Book Club, Reese's Book Club, and Treble Clef and Book Lovers' Club (TCBLC).

== European book clubs ==
German book clubs have included Wissenschaftliche Buchgesellschaft (WBG) and French book clubs have included the Club français du livre.

== See also ==
- Scholastic Corporation
- Leisure Books
- Oprah's Book Club
