= Saints and Strangers =

1945 book by George F. Willison

- First edition
- Author: George F. Willison
- Language: English
- Genre: Non-fiction
- Publisher: Reynal & Hitchcock
- Publication date: 1945
- Publication place: United States

Saints and Strangers is a book by George F. Willison published in 1945 by Reynal & Hitchcock, New York.

Its full title is Saints and Strangers - Being the Lives of the Pilgrim Fathers & Their Families, with Their Friends & Foes: & and Account of Their Posthumous Wanderings in Limbo, Their Final Resurrection & Rise to Glory, & the Strange Pilgrimages of Plymouth Rock.

The book includes an appendix listing names and data of the many "saints and strangers" involved as described in the title.

A softback edition published by Time-Life Books is commonly found in thrift and used book stores.
