= George F. Willison =

American historian

George Findley Willison (1896–1972) was a writer and editor who specialized in American history. He also worked in education, journalism, art, public relations, and the military.

Willison was born in Denver, Colorado and attended the University of Colorado, earning a Bachelor of Arts and graduating in 1918. After serving briefly in the US Army during World War I, he won a Rhodes Scholarship and attended Oxford from 1920 to 1923 with a focus on English history, economics, and political science. He followed this with a year in Paris studying French literature at Sorbonne University.

He returned to the US and worked for newspapers in Denver and New York City between 1925 and 1927.

He spent much of his adult life in New York, after purchasing a home from fellow author Katherine Anne Porter in Malta, NY (Saratoga County). Notable among his books is Saints and Strangers, about the lives of the Mayflower Pilgrims. He also wrote Cliffs Notes for the books Pilgrim's Progress and The Federalist, and contributed to the History of Pittsfield, MA.

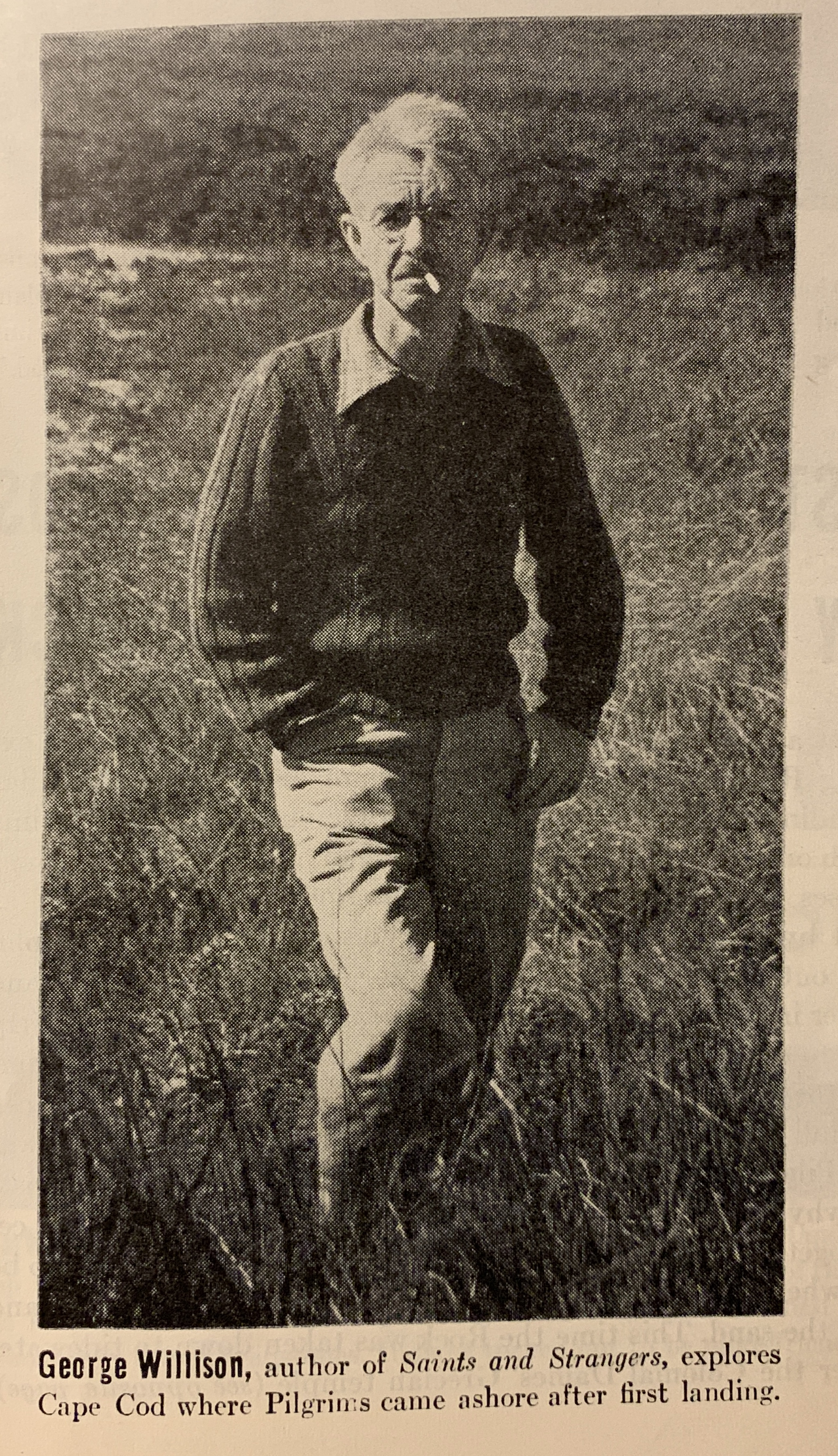

== Books ==
- Here They Dug The Gold (1931, rev. 1945)
- Why Wars are Declared (1936)
- Saints and Strangers (1945)
- ''Behold Virginia: the fifth crown. Being the trials, adventures & disasters of the first families of Virginia, the rise of the grandees & the eventual triumph of the common & uncommon sort in the Revolution (1951)
- I Am an American - Patrick Henry and His World (1969)
- The Pilgrim Reader (1953)
