= Some Buried Caesar =

1939 novel by Rex Stout

- Author: Rex Stout
- Cover artist: Robert Graves
- Language: English
- Series: Nero Wolfe
- Genre: Detective fiction
- Publisher: Farrar & Rinehart
- Publication date: February 2, 1939
- Publication place: United States
- Media type: Print (Hardcover)
- Pages: 296 (first edition)
- OCLC: 18578644
- Preceded by: Too Many Cooks
- Followed by: Over My Dead Body

Some Buried Caesar is a detective novel by American writer Rex Stout, the sixth book featuring his character Nero Wolfe. The story first appeared in abridged form in The American Magazine (December 1938), under the title "The Red Bull", it was first published as a novel by Farrar & Rinehart in 1939. In 2000 it was included in the list of the 100 Favorite Mysteries of the Century by the Independent Mystery Booksellers Association.

== Title ==
The book's title is from The Rubaiyat of Omar Khayyam, originally written in Persian and translated to English in 1859, and published often since that year. The short phrase is in this quatrain, part of which is in the text in Chapter 12:

I sometimes think that never blows so red
The Rose as where some buried Caesar bled;
That every Hyacinth the Garden wears
Dropped in her Lap from some once lovely Head.

== Plot summary ==
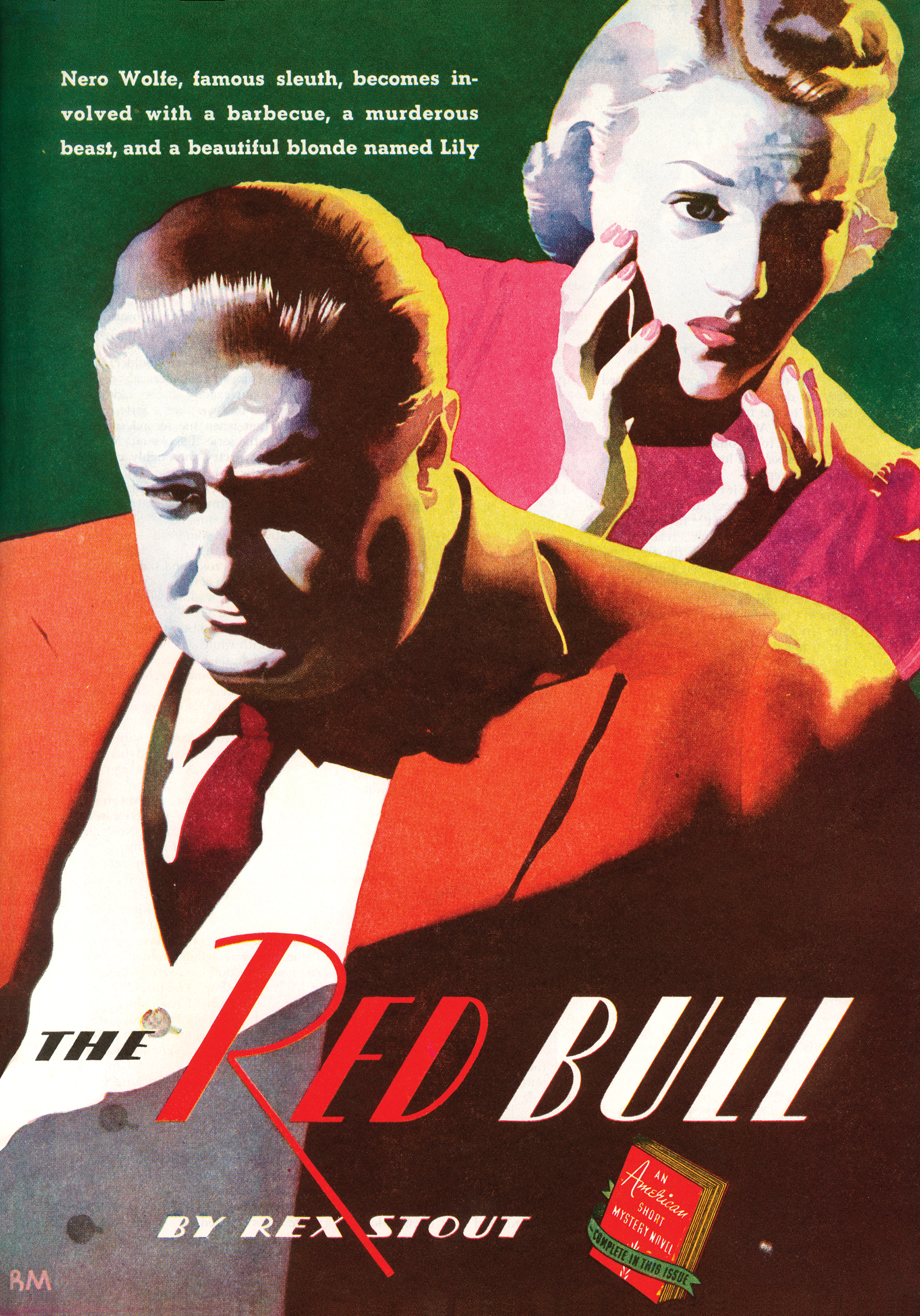
Some Buried Caesar first appeared in abridged form in The American Magazine (December 1938), with watercolor illustrations by Ronald McLeod (1897–1977)

While on their way to a rural exposition in upstate New York to show orchids, Nero Wolfe and Archie Goodwin are involved in a minor car accident. Walking to a nearby house to phone for help, they are threatened by a large bull. They meet Caroline Pratt, a local golf champion, and her acquaintance Lily Rowan, who see Archie escape over the fence. Lily calls him Escamillo, name of the toreador in the opera Carmen. Caroline then gets her car to rescue Wolfe. The house and bull belong to Thomas Pratt, Caroline's uncle and the owner of a large chain of successful fast food restaurants. Pratt owns the champion Guernsey bull called Hickory Caesar Grindon to use in a publicity stunt where barbecued bull will be the dish served.

Wolfe and Archie meet several of Pratt's family and neighbors—Jimmy Pratt, Pratt's nephew; Monte McMillan, the original owner of Caesar, who sold the bull to Pratt after falling into financial difficulties; Clyde Osgood and his sister Nancy, the children of Pratt's neighbor Frederick Osgood; and a New Yorker named Howard Bronson, who is with Clyde. There is tension between the Pratt and Osgood families due to a bitter rivalry between Thomas Pratt and Frederick Osgood. When tempers flare, Clyde makes a bet with Pratt that the latter will not barbecue Caesar. As Pratt is already paranoid due to the hostility of local farmers opposed to his plans to cook Caesar, Wolfe offers Archie's services as a guard for Caesar in exchange for a stay at Pratt's house while the car is repaired. During his watch that night, Lily Rowan shows up; together they see Clyde's body, gored to death in the pasture.

The local authorities assume that Clyde was gored by Caesar during an attempt to sabotage Pratt's plans, but Wolfe believes that Clyde is murdered. The bull's face was cleaner than it would have been had he fatally attacked Clyde. Frederick Osgood hires Wolfe, knowing his son to be experienced with cattle. Wolfe and Archie stay at the Osgood home. Caroline Pratt hires Archie to prevent what she believes to be Lily Rowan's attempts to seduce her brother Jimmy.

In a meeting with Waddell, the local district attorney, Wolfe says that the murder weapon was a digging pick lying nearby. The murderer dragged the unconscious Clyde into the paddock, then used the pick. Waddell, who has a petty rivalry with the elder Osgood, is skeptical but agrees to reopen the investigation. Very soon, news comes that Caesar has died suddenly of anthrax. To prevent anthrax spreading, the bull is cremated. Archie tries to photograph the bull, but arrives too late to document that evidence.

While interviewing Nancy Osgood, Wolfe learns that Bronson is a New York loan shark who is with Clyde to ensure he receives $10,000 that Clyde owes him. When confronted by Wolfe and Archie, Bronson confirms this, but is vague and unhelpful when questioned regarding Clyde's death, keeping him under suspicion. Out of respect for Nancy Osgood, Archie recovers the promissory note Bronson holds by force, and Wolfe warns the loan shark to be careful.

The next day, Wolfe's orchids win numerous prizes at the exposition, defeating a rival in the process. While seeking Mr. Bennet of the cattle association, Archie discovers Jimmy Pratt and Nancy Osgood in a secret rendezvous; the two are lovers, in a relationship secret from their feuding elders. Also by chance, during their confrontation Archie stumbles upon the body of Howard Bronson, gored with a pitchfork and hidden under straw. He conceals the body and returns to Wolfe with the news. When the body is discovered, police Captain Barrow detains Archie, and imprisons him as a material witness when he refuses to reveal what he knows.

The next day, Wolfe secures Archie's release with the promise that he knows who the murderer is and will soon expose him to the authorities. To Archie, Wolfe admits that he knows the murderer's identity, but the evidence to prove it has been destroyed. Based on his memory and official records from the local cattle authorities, Wolfe draws some sketches of the bull that he and Archie saw and uses them to confront Monte McMillan. Wolfe deduces that the bull that Thomas Pratt purchased and intended to barbecue was not Caesar. The champion bull was killed in an anthrax outbreak that killed almost all of McMillan's herd. The bull that was sold as Caesar was Hickory Buckingham Pell, a similar but inferior bull. Facing financial ruin, McMillan offers the bull for an outrageous sum, which Pratt pays. Clyde realizes the deception, given his experience with cattle, and relies on that knowledge to win his bet. McMillan murders Clyde to silence him, and later kills Bronson when the loan shark tries to blackmail him.

Although Wolfe admits that McMillan has covered his tracks well in both murders, the evidence Wolfe has is sufficient to convict McMillan of fraud, which would expose and ruin him nonetheless. Accepting defeat, McMillan reveals that he has infected himself with anthrax and agrees to write a confession out for Wolfe before dying. Months later, Archie records the case, revealing in the process that Jimmy Pratt and Nancy Osgood are engaged to be married and that he has begun a friendship with Lily Rowan, who has returned to New York.

== The unfamiliar word ==
"Nero Wolfe talks in a way that no human being on the face of the earth has ever spoken, with the possible exception of Rex Stout after he had a gin and tonic," said Michael Jaffe, executive producer of the A&E TV series, A Nero Wolfe Mystery. Nero Wolfe's erudite vocabulary is one of the hallmarks of the character. Examples of unfamiliar words — or unfamiliar uses of words that some would otherwise consider familiar — are found throughout the corpus, often in the give-and-take between Wolfe and Archie. Stout did not normally resort to Latin phrases, but Some Buried Caesar contains several.

- Plerophory, chapter 1. Wolfe to Archie, after the shock of the collision that follows a blown tire:

It has happened, and here we are. I presume you know, since I've told you, that my distrust and hatred of vehicles in motion is partly based on my plerophory that their apparent submission to control is illusory and that they may, at their pleasure, and sooner or later will, act on whim. Very well, this one has, and we are intact. Thank God the whim was not a deadlier one.

- Ignoratio elenchi, chapter 4. Wolfe places the Latin phrase subsequent to "sophistry" and "casuistry". The Latin phrase means missing the point in a description or argument.
- Petitio principii, chapter 8, spoken by District Attorney Carter Waddell.
- Apodictically, chapter 9. Wolfe to Frederick Osgood:

Elimination, as such, is tommyrot. Innocence is a negative and can never be established; you can only establish guilt. The only way I can apodictically eliminate any individual from consideration as the possible murderer is to find out who did it.

- Ethology, chapter 13. Wolfe, after Bronson accuses him of name calling:

Just so. I can excoriate stupidity, and often do, because it riles me, but moral indignation is a dangerous indulgence. Ethology is a chaos. Financial banditry, for example ... I either condemn it or I don't; and if I do, without prejudice, where will I find jailers? No. My only excuse for labeling you an unscrupulous blackguard is the dictionary, and I do it to clarify our positions. I'm in the detective business, and you're in the blackguard business ...

== Cast of characters ==
- Nero Wolfe – The private investigator
- Archie Goodwin – Wolfe's assistant, and the narrator of all Wolfe stories
- Thomas Pratt – The owner of a chain of fast-food restaurants, who plans to barbecue a champion Guernsey bull for publicity
- Monte McMillan – The stockman who sold the champion bull Caesar to Pratt
- Frederick Osgood – Pratt's neighbor, a wealthy landowner whose prodigal son is found gored to death in a cow pasture
- Clyde and Nancy Osgood – Frederick Osgood's son and daughter
- Caroline and Jimmy Pratt – Thomas Pratt's niece and nephew
- Lily Rowan – A free spirit from Manhattan with whom Clyde Osgood is smitten. Introduced in this book, Miss Rowan makes frequent appearances later in the series, as a prominent figure in some plots and as Archie's close friend.
- Howard Bronson – A mysterious, sinister acquaintance of Clyde Osgood, also from Manhattan
- Lou Bennet — Head of the cattle association, upset at Pratt’s price for and use of the bull, and source of useful knowledge to Wolfe.

== Reviews and commentary ==
- Isaac Anderson, The New York Times Book Review (February 5, 1939) — Only twice since Rex Stout began to record his adventures in detection has Nero Wolfe left his home for an extended stay. The first time was when he attended a convention of chefs (Too Many Cooks). This time he goes to exhibit his orchids, and again he arrives at the scene of a murder before it happens. A prize bull is suspected of the killing, but Wolfe knows better, although he keeps his opinion to himself because he prefers not to take on another investigation away from home. When it proves impossible to keep out of the case he agrees to take a hand and the mystery is as good as solved, even though it does look at times as though Wolfe has, for once, met his match. The story is told in the usual breezy Rex Stout manner — the breeziness being supplied chiefly by Archie Goodwin — and anybody who reads detective stories can tell you that Rex Stout and Nero Wolfe make a combination that is hard to beat.
- Jacques Barzun and Wendell Hertig Taylor, A Catalogue of Crime — The story of the prize bull, to be highly esteemed by all Stout partisans. Nero and Archie in top form despite rural surroundings.
- Clifton Fadiman, The New Yorker (February 3, 1939) — Clyde Osgood is found gored to death, and Hickory Caesar Grindon, prize bull, is the natural suspect. Fortunately, Nero Wolfe and his Watson, Archie Goodwin, are on the spot to run down the real murderer. Mr. Stout's dialogue and clever plots seem to get better and better.
- The Saturday Review of Literature (February 4, 1939) — Ingenious plot, Nero's eccentricities, Archie Goodwin's wise-cracks keep story on Stout's best level. Verdict: Unbeatable.
- Terry Teachout, "Forty years with Nero Wolfe" (January 12, 2009) — Rex Stout's witty, fast-moving prose hasn't dated a day, while Wolfe himself is one of the enduringly great eccentrics of popular fiction. I've spent the past four decades reading and re-reading Stout's novels for pleasure, and they have yet to lose their savor ... It is to revel in such writing that I return time and again to Stout's books, and in particular to The League of Frightened Men, Some Buried Caesar, The Silent Speaker, Too Many Women, Murder by the Book, Before Midnight, Plot It Yourself, Too Many Clients, The Doorbell Rang, and Death of a Doxy, which are for me the best of all the full-length Wolfe novels.
- Time (March 6, 1939) — Attempted barbecue of a championship bull cooks the goose of two up-State New Yorkers. Not expert-proof, but Nero Wolfe's sleuthing and Archie Goodwin's cracks make it Rex Stout's best.

== Adaptations ==
=== Per la fama di Cesare (Radiotelevisione Italiana) ===
Some Buried Caesar was adapted for a series of Nero Wolfe films produced by the Italian television network RAI (Radiotelevisione Italiana). Directed by Giuliana Berlinguer from a teleplay by Edoardo Anton, Nero Wolfe: Per la fama di Cesare first aired March 11, 1969.

The series of black-and-white telemovies stars Tino Buazzelli (Nero Wolfe), Paolo Ferrari (Archie Goodwin), Pupo De Luca (Fritz Brenner), Renzo Palmer (Inspector Cramer), Roberto Pistone (Saul Panzer), Mario Righetti (Orrie Cather) and Gianfranco Varetto (Fred Durkin). Other members of the cast of Per la fama di Cesare include Gabriella Pallotta (Lily Rowan), Antonio Rais (Dave), Aldo Giuffrè (Thomas Pratt), Umberto Ceriani (Jimmy), Franco Sportelli (MacMillan), Giorgio Favretto (Clyde Osgood) and Nicoletta Languasco (Nancy Osgood).

== Publication history ==
The second of only three Nero Wolfe volumes to be issued as a Dell mapback, The Red Bull featured a scene-of-the-crime map by Gerald Gregg on the back cover (Dell #70, January 1945).

- 1938, The American Magazine, December 1938, abridged as "The Red Bull"
- 1939, New York: Farrar & Rinehart, February 2, 1939, hardcover

In his limited-edition pamphlet, Collecting Mystery Fiction #9, Rex Stout's Nero Wolfe Part I, Otto Penzler describes the first edition of Some Buried Caesar: "Green cloth, front cover and spine printed with black; rear cover blank. Issued in a full-color pictorial dust wrapper … The first edition has the publisher's monogram logo on the copyright page. The second printing, in March 1939, is identical to the first except that the logo was dropped."
In April 2006, Firsts: The Book Collector's Magazine estimated that the first edition of Some Buried Caesar had a value of between $2,500 and $5,000.

- 1939, Toronto: Oxford University Press, 1939, hardcover
- 1939, London: Collins Crime Club, July 3, 1939, hardcover
- 1940, New York: Grosset & Dunlap, 1940, hardcover
- 1941, New York: Triangle, October 1941, hardcover
- 1942, New York; Lawrence E. Spivak, Bestseller Mystery B31, digest paperback
- 1945, New York: Dell (mapback by Gerald Gregg) #70, January 1945, as The Red Bull: A Nero Wolfe Story, paperback
- 1958, New York: The Viking Press, All Aces: A Nero Wolfe Omnibus (with Too Many Women and Trouble in Triplicate), May 15, 1958, hardcover
- 1963, New York: Pyramid (Green Door) #R931, November 1963, paperback
- 1972, London: Tom Stacey, 1972, hardcover
- 1994, New York: Bantam Crimeline ISBN 0-553-25464-2 June 1994, paperback, Rex Stout Library edition with introduction by Diane Mott Davidson
- 1998, Auburn, California: The Audio Partners Publishing Corp., Mystery Masters ISBN 1-57270-054-8 August 1998, audio cassette (unabridged, read by Michael Prichard)
- 2008, New York: Bantam Dell Publishing Group (with The Golden Spiders) ISBN 0-553-38567-4 September 30, 2008, trade paperback
- 2010, New York: Bantam Crimeline ISBN 978-0-307-75619-0 September 8, 2010, e-book
