= Too Many Women (novel) =

1947 novel by Rex Stout

- Author: Rex Stout
- Cover artist: Robert Hallock
- Language: English
- Series: Nero Wolfe
- Genre: Detective fiction
- Publisher: Viking Press
- Publication date: October 20, 1947
- Publication place: United States
- Media type: Print (hardcover)
- Pages: 251 pp. (first edition)
- OCLC: 1463556
- Preceded by: The Silent Speaker
- Followed by: And Be a Villain

Too Many Women is a Nero Wolfe detective novel by Rex Stout, published in 1947 by the Viking Press. The novel was also collected in the omnibus volume All Aces (Viking 1958).

== Plot introduction ==
I told him I was Archie Goodwin, the heart, liver, lungs, and gizzard of the private detective business of Nero Wolfe, Wolfe being merely the brains. He asked sarcastically if I was a genius too, and I told him no indeed, I was comparatively human.

— Archie Goodwin converses with the prospective client in Too Many Women, chapter 1

A malcontent at the Naylor-Kerr corporation charges that one of its employees, thought to have been killed in a hit-and-run accident, was actually murdered. The president of the giant New York firm hires Archie to look for proof one way or another, in the guise of a personnel consultant in the corporation's executive offices — where 500 beautiful women are employed.

== Plot summary ==
When a major engineering corporation conducts a survey into high employee turnover, a report is returned claiming that Waldo Moore, an employee recently killed in what was believed to be a hit-and-run accident, was murdered. The company president, Jasper Pine, approaches Nero Wolfe and hires him to find out whether this claim is true. Archie Goodwin is sent undercover as an outside consultant and assigned to investigate the stock department, where Moore worked, and is amazed to discover 500 beautiful women employed as secretaries and assistants.

Archie discovers that Moore was notorious among the employees as a lothario but had become engaged to Hester Livsey, a stenographer. He quickly identifies numerous possible suspects for Moore's murder — in addition to Livsey, these include Rosa Bendini, who had enjoyed a dalliance with Moore; Bendini's jealous estranged husband Harold Anthony; Gwynne Ferris, who had tried to seduce Moore but was rebuffed; Benjamin Frenkel, a supervisor who had developed feelings for Ferris and had been rebuffed; and Sumner Hoff, a hot-headed technical advisor who had gotten into a physical fight with Moore, which was believed to be over Livsey. As gossip begins to spread among the employees about Archie's true mission, he begins to clash with Kerr Naylor, the eccentric and unpleasant department supervisor who lodged the initial report claiming that Moore was murdered.

During one confrontation, Naylor reveals that he knows Archie's true identity, and that Moore had been given his job due to the intervention of Naylor's sister Cecily, who is also married to Jasper Pine. Naylor and Cecily are the children of one of the founders of the company, and Naylor resents Pine being promoted over him. Naylor also claims that he knows the identity of Moore's murderer, but when Archie reveals this in a report to the company directors he changes his story and claims Archie was lying. Cecily Pine meets with Wolfe, asking him to drop the investigation.

When an article about Wolfe's investigation appears in the newspapers, Inspector Cramer confronts Wolfe in his office about what he knows. The increasingly heated and childish argument is interrupted by a phone call for Cramer; Kerr Naylor has been found dead, killed in a seeming hit-and-run accident in exactly the same manner and location that Waldo Moore had been found. The similarity of the deaths and the location remove any doubt that both men have been the victim of homicide. Wolfe had previously assigned Saul Panzer to shadow Naylor and, while Saul had lost the tail before Naylor's murder, Saul managed to witness Naylor arguing with Hester Livsey hours before his death, with Sumner Hoff also present at the scene.

The company directors hire Wolfe to solve the murder of Kerr Naylor in addition to Waldo Moore. Archie hints to Livsey that he is aware of her meeting with Naylor prior to his death, and her suspicious reaction convinces him that she knows even more of the matter than she has let on. Archie persuades her to come to Wolfe's office for an interview, but Sumner Hoff tags along, suspicious and confrontational towards both Archie and Wolfe. When Wolfe challenges them regarding her meeting with Naylor, both claim that they were with each other at the time, concocting an overly detailed story as corroboration. While the lie is obvious, it is also sufficiently unbreakable to completely stall the investigation.

Insulted by the transparency of Livsey's lie, Wolfe concocts a plan to expose the truth. Archie stages a meeting with Livsey which, with Archie's prodding, quickly results in the rumour spreading that Livsey knows the identity of the murderer. Livsey eventually cracks under the pressure and insists that she will reveal the truth to anyone other than Jasper Pine. Archie convinces her to accompany him to the brownstone for her protection, where Wolfe summons Cecily Pine by informing her that he knows who the murderer is.

When she arrives, Cecily Pine confirms Wolfe's suspicions—the murderer was her husband, Jasper Pine. Pine and Livsey had begun a clandestine affair, but Pine had become increasingly obsessed with her. Although unbothered by the actual affair, Cecily had begun to worry that her husband's obsession was threatening their comfortable lifestyle, and so persuaded Moore to seduce Livsey away from her husband. When Moore and Livsey ended up falling in love, Pine was driven to a jealous rage and murdered Moore. Cecily confided in her brother, and Naylor used the information to try and force Pine out of the company presidency and seize it for himself, but Pine murdered him.

Before the authorities can be notified, Wolfe receives news that Jasper Pine has committed suicide. Wolfe and Archie realise that Cecily contacted her husband before meeting Wolfe, and manipulated him into taking his own life. The investigation is closed, and Archie ends the novel by arranging a simultaneous date with Hester Livsey, Rosa Bendini and Gwynne Ferris.

== Extraordinary events ==
The resolution to this Nero Wolfe case is made significantly more difficult by two events that border on impossibility within the Nero Wolfe universe: 1) A person that Saul Panzer is tailing loses him, and 2) Fritz forgets to give Archie a message. All of the principal characters in the novel are aghast at how astronomically unlikely each of these events is by itself, never mind both of them occurring in a short period of time.

Inspector Cramer, who always assumes Wolfe is keeping vital information from him, is perhaps most convinced of that in this Nero Wolfe story than in any other, since to take what Wolfe and Archie are telling him at face value, he must believe that these two "impossible" events took place (even though they actually did).

== Reviews and commentary ==
- Isaac Anderson, The New York Times Book Review (October 19, 1947) — Archie Goodwin, Nero Wolfe's right-hand man, takes an assumed name and enters the employ of the engineering firm of Naylor-Kerr, Inc., in order to investigate the death of a former employee of that firm. In no time at all everybody in the Naylor-Kerr organization knows who Archie is and what he is doing. Naturally that makes it a bit difficult for him to carry on. Another difficulty is that there are so many liars about the place. Nero Wolfe advises Archie to counter-attack by capping their lies with others of his own, which Archie does with excellent results. Most of the women in the case—all very attractive—are employees of Naylor-Kerr, and one of them is even more closely connected with the firm. Nero and Archie win out despite the obstructive tactics of almost everyone concerned. But why does Rex Stout call these books Nero Wolfe novels? Surely Archie Goodwin deserves equal billing with his obese employer.
- Jacques Barzun and Wendell Hertig Taylor, A Catalogue of Crime — Archie is the center of a seraglio of designing creatures, who want to bribe or seduce him as he helps Nero discover who killed (the victim in a firm) that employs 500 women. Longer than the later tales, this one has a great many lively turns and a good surprise ending.
- David Lehman, "Escape Into New York", The New York Times (November 25, 2001) — Of Stout's 72 Nero Wolfe novels, the mystery aficionado Jacques Barzun prefers Too Many Cooks (1938). I vote for Too Many Women (1947). But you can't go wrong with And Be a Villain (1948) and The Silent Speaker (1946) if the place you'd like to escape to is New York in the late 1940s.
- Terry Teachout, "Forty years with Nero Wolfe" (January 12, 2009) — Rex Stout's witty, fast-moving prose hasn't dated a day, while Wolfe himself is one of the enduringly great eccentrics of popular fiction. I've spent the past four decades reading and re-reading Stout's novels for pleasure, and they have yet to lose their savor ... It is to revel in such writing that I return time and again to Stout's books, and in particular to The League of Frightened Men, Some Buried Caesar, The Silent Speaker, Too Many Women, Murder by the Book, Before Midnight, Plot It Yourself, Too Many Clients, The Doorbell Rang, and Death of a Doxy, which are for me the best of all the full-length Wolfe novels.
- J. Kenneth Van Dover, At Wolfe's Door — Too Many Women is one of the last novels of the series to animate the established conventions without going beyond them (e.g. by introducing a master criminal or by implicating one of the members of the repertory cast). Wolfe's role is subordinate to that of Archie, who engages in a number of entertaining encounters with the women of Naylor-Kerr.

== Publication history ==
- 1947, New York: The Viking Press, October 20, 1947, hardcover

In his limited-edition pamphlet, Collecting Mystery Fiction #9, Rex Stout's Nero Wolfe Part I, Otto Penzler describes the first edition of Too Many Women: "Green cloth, front cover and spine printed with very dark green lettering and yellow wavy rule; rear cover blank. Issued in a full-color pictorial dust wrapper."
In April 2006, Firsts: The Book Collector's Magazine estimated that the first edition of Too Many Women had a value of between $400 and $750. The estimate is for a copy in very good to fine condition in a like dustjacket.

- 1947, Toronto: Macmillan, 1947, hardcover
- 1948, New York: Detective Book Club #68, February 1948, hardcover
- 1948, London: Collins Crime Club, April 12, 1948, hardcover
- 1949, New York: Bantam #722, October 1949, first paperback
- London: Collins (White Circle) #205c, not dated, paperback
- 1958, New York: The Viking Press, All Aces: A Nero Wolfe Omnibus (with Some Buried Caesar and Trouble in Triplicate), May 15, 1958, hardcover
- 1964, London: Fontana, 1964, paperback
- 1985, New York: Bantam, ISBN 0-553-25066-3 July 1985, paperback
- 2007, New Kingstown, RI: BBC Audiobooks America, Mystery Masters ISBN 1-57270-850-6 September 7, 2007 [1999], CD (unabridged, read by Michael Prichard)
- 2011, New York: Bantam ISBN 978-0-307-76808-7 August 17, 2011, e-book
