= The League of Frightened Men =

Novel by Rex Stout

- Author: Rex Stout
- Cover artist: Winifred E. Lefferts
- Language: English
- Series: Nero Wolfe
- Genre: Detective fiction
- Publisher: Farrar & Rinehart
- Publication date: August 14, 1935
- Publication place: United States
- Media type: Print (Hardcover)
- Pages: 308 pp. (first edition)
- OCLC: 4713048
- Preceded by: Fer-de-Lance
- Followed by: The Rubber Band

The League of Frightened Men is the second Nero Wolfe detective novel by Rex Stout. The story was serialized in six issues of The Saturday Evening Post (June 15–July 20, 1935) under the title The Frightened Men. The novel was published in 1935 by Farrar & Rinehart, Inc. The League of Frightened Men is a Haycraft Queen Cornerstone, one of the most influential works of mystery fiction listed by crime fiction historian Howard Haycraft and Ellery Queen.

== Plot introduction ==
When two men die under mysterious circumstances and a third disappears after appealing to Wolfe for protection, suspicion falls on Paul Chapin, a controversial author and friend of the three men who was severely injured many years ago at their hands as a result of a hazing prank. The remainder of the men involved, united together as a "League of Atonement", are in fear for their lives against Chapin's vengeance, but when a third man dies Wolfe determines that he may not be the only threat they face.

== Plot summary ==
After reading a controversial new novel by an author called Paul Chapin, Nero Wolfe reveals to Archie Goodwin that he has been approached by Andrew Hibbard, a psychologist fearing for his life. Hibbard had received threatening poems from an individual he refused to name, but after reading a phrase in Chapin's book that also appeared in the poems, Wolfe has deduced that the man Hibbard feared is Chapin. Wolfe orders Archie to contact Hibbard to offer Wolfe’s services, but when Archie does so he learns that Hibbard has disappeared under mysterious circumstances.

Hibbard is a member of “the League of Atonement”, a group of college friends who once played a prank on Chapin that, to their lingering shame and remorse, left him permanently crippled. In addition to Hibbard's disappearance, two other members of the group have also died under mysterious circumstances, and both Hibbard’s niece Evelyn and the police suspect that Chapin has murdered them. Wolfe acquires a list of the other men in the League and summons them to his office, where he proposes to both determine the truth behind the deaths of their mutual friends and remove the threat that they believe Chapin poses. The meeting is interrupted by Chapin himself, who claims innocence in the affair but refuses to provide evidence when Wolfe challenges him to do so. This prompts the League to agree to Wolfe’s terms.

Wolfe has Archie arrange for Chapin to be tailed as closely as possible, a search for Hibbard to be conducted, and the two deaths to be investigated. Archie discovers that another member of the League, Dr. Leopold Elkus, is also tangentially involved in the two deaths and, as Elkus is sympathetic to Chapin, begins to suspect that he is helping him commit the murders. He also discovers the existence of a mysterious man with gold teeth and a pink tie who also appears to be tailing Chapin. On bringing this man to Wolfe, they discover it is in fact Andrew Hibbard. Hibbard, driven to desperation by his fear and paranoia of Chapin, had faked his death and begun following Chapin to work up the courage to murder him.

Soon after, Paul Chapin is arrested for the sudden murder of Dr. Loring Burton, who is both a fellow member of the League and the man who married the woman Chapin was in love with. This prompts Wolfe to take the drastic step of leaving his home to consult with Chapin, while Archie gains the trust of Burton’s wife and learns that Dora Chapin, the wife of Paul Chapin and Burton’s former house-maid, had visited Burton before he was murdered. Believing Dora to be the murderer, Archie attempts to confront her but is drugged and incapacitated.

Upon regaining consciousness, Archie is alarmed to discover that Dora Chapin has apparently kidnapped Wolfe. On receiving a message from Wolfe, however, he learns that Wolfe has convinced Dora Chapin that he poses no threat to her husband and does not believe him to be guilty of murder. Wolfe then summons the members of the League to his office, where he produces Hibbard and reveals a confession he has apparently received from Paul Chapin. To the League’s surprise the letter confirms, as Wolfe suspected all along, that Chapin had no involvement in the deaths of their two mutual friends at all. The deaths were an unfortunate accident and a suicide respectively, but Chapin, psychologically incapable of murder but resentful of his friends for both their responsibility for his injury and their pity towards him, sent the poems to scare his friends and gain his vengeance on them that way.

Incredulous and skeptical of Wolfe’s claims, the League vote on whether to pay Wolfe. When the vote indicates that Wolfe will not receive his fee, Wolfe presses one member—Ferdinand Bowen, a stockbroker—to change his vote. When Bowen refuses, Wolfe reveals that Bowen is in fact Burton’s murderer. Burton had discovered that Bowen had been embezzling from him and other members of the League whose investments he managed, and Bowen used the fear and paranoia that everyone had of Chapin to stage Burton’s murder and throw suspicion on Chapin. Bowen is arrested, leaving Archie to realise that Chapin’s letter was faked. His vengeance thwarted, Chapin reveals to Wolfe that he will be basing a character on Wolfe in a forthcoming novel, and that character will meet a very unpleasant end.

== The unfamiliar word ==
"Nero Wolfe talks in a way that no human being on the face of the earth has ever spoken, with the possible exception of Rex Stout after he had a gin and tonic," said Michael Jaffe, executive producer of the A&E TV series, A Nero Wolfe Mystery.

"Readers of the Wolfe saga often have to turn to the dictionary because of the erudite vocabulary of Wolfe and sometimes of Archie," wrote Rev. Frederick G. Gotwald.

Examples of unfamiliar words — or unfamiliar uses of words that some would otherwise consider familiar — are found throughout the corpus, often in the give-and-take between Wolfe and Archie.

- Viva voce, chapter 2. Wolfe refers Archie to a conversation in the office that was transcribed by a stenographer hired while Archie was away:

I nodded, glancing over the typewritten pages. "Andrew Hibbard. Instructor in psychology at Columbia. It was on October twentieth, a Saturday, that’s two weeks ago today."
"Suppose you read it."
"Viva voce?"
"Archie." Wolfe looked at me. "Where did you pick that up, where did you learn to pronounce it, and what do you think it means?"
"Do you want me to read this stuff out loud, sir?"
"It doesn't mean out loud. Confound you." Wolfe emptied his glass, leaned back in his chair, got his fingers to meet in front of his belly, and laced them. "Proceed."

- Juridical, chapter 21. Wolfe urges objectivity from the assembled League members:

"You cannot be at the same time juridical and partisan, at least not with any pretense at competence."

== Reviews and commentary ==
- Jacques Barzun and Wendell Hertig Taylor, A Catalogue of Crime — Archie gets some rough handling and even cries in this longish and complicated story of threatened and actual violence embracing two and a half dozen men of various occupations and characters, who in the past have injured a youth whose revenge they now fear.
- Clifton Fadiman, The New Yorker — The second book about Nero Wolfe, newest of eccentric detectives, and good enough to prove that his success isn't just a fluke. An excellent story about thirty [sic] men scared to death by a cripple, told out of the side of the mouth.
- Terry Teachout, "Forty years with Nero Wolfe" (January 12, 2009) — Rex Stout's witty, fast-moving prose hasn't dated a day, while Wolfe himself is one of the enduringly great eccentrics of popular fiction. I've spent the past four decades reading and re-reading Stout's novels for pleasure, and they have yet to lose their savor ... It is to revel in such writing that I return time and again to Stout's books, and in particular to The League of Frightened Men, Some Buried Caesar, The Silent Speaker, Too Many Women, Murder by the Book, Before Midnight, Plot It Yourself, Too Many Clients, The Doorbell Rang, and Death of a Doxy, which are for me the best of all the full-length Wolfe novels.

== Cultural references ==
René Magritte's 1942 painting, Les compagnons de la peur, bears the title Gallimard used for The League of Frightened Men when Stout's novel was published in France.

"A number of the paintings of René Magritte (1898–1967), the internationally famous Belgian painter, are named after titles of books by Rex Stout," wrote Magritte's attorney and friend Harry Torczyner. (Note: Rex Stout's biographer John McAleer quotes a letter dated May 24, 1974, that he received from Harry Torczyner, a New York collector who was also Georges Simenon's attorney.) (Note: "We know the importance granted to the words by Magritte in his paintings and we know the impact that literary works such as Poe's, Rex Stout's or Mallarmé's had on him," the Magritte Museum has stated.) "He read Hegel, Heidegger and Sartre, as well as Dashiell Hammett, Rex Stout and Georges Simenon," the Times Higher Education Supplement wrote of Magritte. "Some of his best titles were 'found' in this way."

Magritte's 1942 painting, Les compagnons de la peur ("The Companions of Fear"), bears the title given to The League of Frightened Men when it was published in France in 1939 by Gallimard. It is one of Magritte's series of "leaf-bird" paintings. Created during the Nazi occupation of Brussels, it depicts a stormy, mountainous landscape in which a cluster of plants has metamorphosed into a group of vigilant owls.

"The title of this widely exhibited painting—like those of many of his works—was drawn from wide-ranging literary sources, not least the detective novels of Rex Stout," wrote Apollo magazine. Susan Moore, associate editor of the British arts journal, described Magritte's painting as "compellingly sinister. The wartime date of this canvas, painted during the Nazi occupation of Belgium, is significant, for there is a real sense of foreboding in this near monochrome image of beady-eyed, watchful owls." Christie's auctioned Les compagnons de la peur for more than $6 million in February 2015.

The League of Frightened Men is also the first song to be released off the 2016 album "Dead Languages" by Philadelphia rapper and producer Lushlife.

== Adaptations ==
=== The League of Frightened Men ===
Columbia Pictures adapted the novel for its 1937 film The League of Frightened Men. Lionel Stander reprised his Meet Nero Wolfe role as Archie Goodwin, and Walter Connolly starred as Nero Wolfe.

== Publication history ==
Rico Tomaso illustrated the six-part serialized printing of The Frightened Men for The Saturday Evening Post (June 15–July 20, 1935)

- 1935, The Saturday Evening Post, June 15–July 20, 1935, as The Frightened Men
- 1935, New York: Farrar & Rinehart, August 14, 1935, hardcover

In his limited-edition pamphlet, Collecting Mystery Fiction #9, Rex Stout's Nero Wolfe Part I, Otto Penzler describes the first edition of The League of Frightened Men: "Black cloth, gold lettering on front cover and spine; rear cover blank. Issued in a mainly black, white and gray pictorial dust wrapper … The first edition has the publisher's monogram logo on the copyright page. The second printing, in September 1935, is identical to the first except that the logo was dropped."
In April 2006, Firsts: The Book Collector's Magazine estimated that the first edition of The League of Frightened Men had a value of "$15,000 and up."

- 1935, Toronto: Oxford University Press, 1935, hardcover
- 1935, London: Cassell, 1935, hardcover
- 1937, New York: Grosset & Dunlap, 1937, hardcover
- 1940, New York: Triangle, January 1940, hardcover
- 1942, New York: Lawrence E. Spivak, Mercury Mystery #48, not dated, ca. January 1942, abridged, digest paperback
- 1942, New York: Avon #20, 1942, paperback
- 1944, Cleveland, Ohio: World Publishing Company, The Nero Wolfe Omnibus (with The Red Box), January 1944, hardcover
- 1948, New York: Lawrence E. Spivak, Jonathan Press Mystery #J-33, not dated, abridged, digest paperback
- 1955, New York: Viking Press, Full House: A Nero Wolfe Omnibus (with And Be a Villain and Curtains for Three), May 15, 1955, hardcover
- 1961, London: Penguin, 1961, paperback
- 1963, New York: Pyramid (Green Door), October 1963, paperback
- 1979, New York: Jove, June 1979, paperback
- 1992, New York: Bantam Crimeline ISBN 0-553-25933-4 February 1992, paperback, Rex Stout Library edition with introduction by Robert Goldsborough
- 1996, Burlington, Ontario: Durkin Hayes Publishing, DH Audio ISBN 0-88646-418-8 September 1996, audio cassette (read by Saul Rubinek)
- 2004, Auburn, California: The Audio Partners Publishing Corp., Mystery Masters ISBN 1-57270-404-7 July 2004, audio CD (unabridged, read by Michael Prichard)
- 2008, New York: Bantam Dell Publishing Group (with Fer-de-Lance) ISBN 0-553-38545-3 June 2008, paperback
- 2010, New York: Bantam ISBN 978-0-307-75602-2 April 28, 2010, e-book
