= The Rubber Band =

1936 novel by Rex Stout

- Author: Rex Stout
- Cover artist: Winifred E. Lefferts
- Language: English
- Series: Nero Wolfe
- Genre: Detective fiction
- Publisher: Farrar & Rinehart
- Publication date: April 9, 1936
- Publication place: United States
- Media type: Print (Hardcover)
- Pages: 308 pp. (first edition)
- OCLC: 4962869
- Preceded by: The League of Frightened Men
- Followed by: The Red Box

The Rubber Band is the third Nero Wolfe detective novel by Rex Stout. Prior to its publication in 1936 by Farrar & Rinehart, Inc., the novel was serialized in six issues of The Saturday Evening Post (February 29 – April 4, 1936). Appearing in one 1960 paperback edition titled To Kill Again, The Rubber Band was also collected in the omnibus volume Five of a Kind (Viking 1961).

== Plot introduction ==
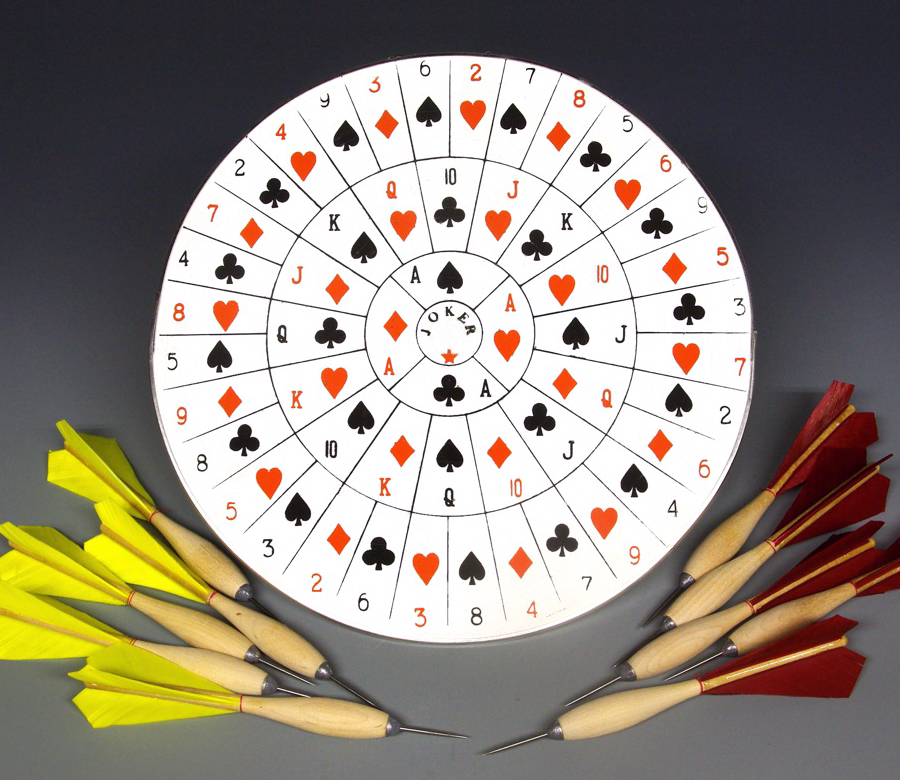

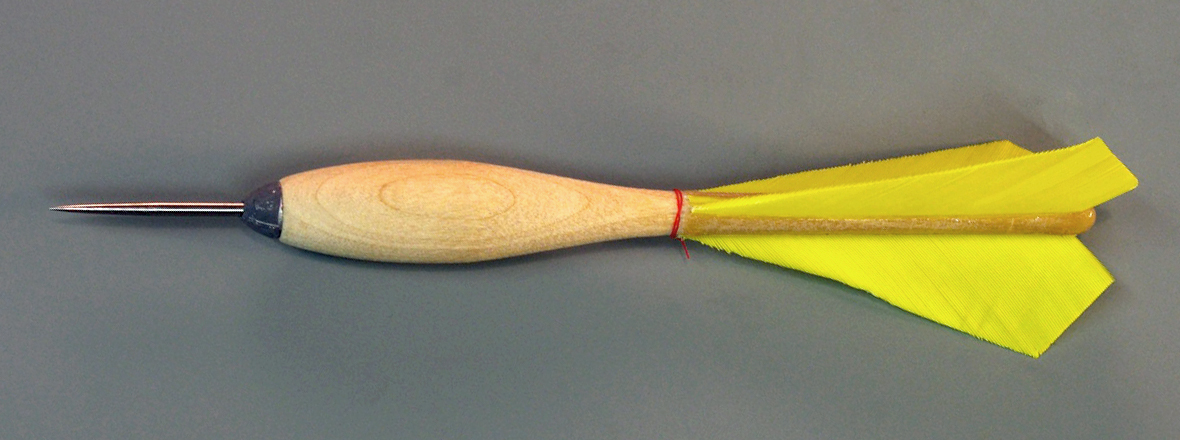
"He took his coat and vest off, exhibiting about eighteen square feet of canary-yellow shirt, and chose the darts with yellow feathers, which were his favorites."

Wolfe still paid no attention to me. As a matter of fact, I didn't expect him to, since he was busy taking exercise. He had recently got the impression that he weighed too much—which was about the same as if the Atlantic Ocean formed the opinion that it was too wet—and so had added a new item to his daily routine. … He called the darts javelins.

— Archie Goodwin in The Rubber Band, chapter 1

The Rubber Band opens with the revelation that Wolfe has added a workout to his daily schedule. He hurls yellow-feathered darts at a poker-dart board that Fritz hangs in the office from 3:45 to 4 p.m. Archie had joined in at first, but quit when he found he had lost nearly $100 to Wolfe in the first two months. "There was no chance of getting any real accuracy with it, it was mostly luck," Archie writes. On this particular Sunday, Wolfe exercises alone while Archie needles him by reading aloud, at length, from The New York Times Magazine.

The novel introduces Lieutenant Rowcliff, not one of the NYPD's finest (in the opinion not only of Wolfe but Inspector Cramer). Rowcliff's search throughout the brownstone for Wolfe's client, Clara Fox, earns Wolfe's enmity, which lasts until the final Wolfe novel in 1975. In addition, The Rubber Band contains the first documented death to occur in Wolfe's office.

== Plot summary ==
Nero Wolfe is approached by Anthony D. Perry, president of the Seaboard Products Corporation, who is concerned that one of his employees is being unjustly accused of theft. A package containing $30,000 has gone missing, and Ramsey Muir, the company's vice-president, is accusing Clara Fox, Perry's personal assistant. Perry's meeting with Archie Goodwin is interrupted by Harlan Scovil, who has recently arrived in New York City from Wyoming and is one of a group that has a later appointment with Wolfe. At one point, Scovil seems to mistake Perry for another man, Mike Walsh.

Before Archie can attend to Scovil, he is summoned to Perry's offices, where Muir—motivated by jealousy and spite after Clara rejected his advances—is threatening to call the police. Archie's preliminary investigations turn up little, and he arrives back to the brownstone to learn that Scovil has left, summoned away by a telephone call. However, the other members of his group have arrived, including the real Mike Walsh, and Archie is surprised to discover that Clara Fox is their leader. Clara wishes to hire Wolfe to recover a sum of money owed to the group by the Marquis of Clivers, a British nobleman in America on confidential government business. Years ago, the group (or in the case of Clara, her father) were a Wild West posse called "The Rubber Band," and they saved the future Marquis from a lynching. The Marquis promised them a substantial share of his fortune in return but has rebuffed Clara's claims.

Rico Tomaso illustrated the six-part serialized printing of The Rubber Band for The Saturday Evening Post (February 29–April 4, 1936)

The discussion is interrupted by a police detective who brings the news that Harlan Scovil has been murdered. In his pockets were found the contact details for the Marquis of Clivers, prompting the police, eager to avoid inconveniencing the Marquis and causing diplomatic issues with Britain, to suspect the group of blackmail. Wolfe also learns from Fred Durkin that the police have found the missing $30,000 in Clara's car, and a warrant has been issued for her arrest. Once the policeman has left, Wolfe questions Fox concerning the stolen money and the murder. Satisfied as to her honesty and innocence on both matters, he accepts her as his client and persuades her to remain in the brownstone. Mike Walsh rejects Wolfe's offer of protection and storms out. Wolfe sends a letter to the Marquis informing him of the group's claims and suggesting that legal action may be taken; he also informs Perry that he will not be investigating on behalf of him or the corporation.

For several days, the numerous charges that Clara is facing mean that Wolfe is forced to keep her as his guest in the brownstone. Eventually, the police, led by the obnoxious Lt. Rowcliff, arrive with a search and arrest warrant to enter the brownstone and arrest Clara for the theft of the $30,000. Wolfe is outraged by Rowcliff's impertinence, but he is forced to allow the police to search the premises. Clara, however, cannot be found, and once the police have left, Wolfe reveals that he concealed her in the orchid rooms.

Wolfe receives a visit from the Marquis of Clivers himself, who insists that he has already paid his debt to the Rubber Band. He claims that the group's leader, Rubber Coleman, approached him years ago representing the Band, and that on receiving the money, Coleman provided him with a receipt signed by the other members. The next day, Archie receives a phone call from Mike Walsh claiming that he has found "him," only for the call to be ended by a loud noise that sounds like a gunshot. Moments after the call, Walsh is found dead with the Marquis of Clivers standing over the body. Inspector Cramer, Police Commissioner Hombert, and District Attorney Skinner arrive at the brownstone and demand that Wolfe share what he has learned about the case. Wolfe produces Clara and provides proof that she neither stole the $30,000 nor murdered Scovil and Walsh. He reveals to the authorities that he is almost ready to solve the case, but one lingering unresolved detail is troubling him.

The next morning, Archie is surprised to find Wolfe slamming wooden boards in the orchid rooms to no purpose that Archie can see. Wolfe takes notice of Archie's bundle of papers secured with a rubber band. After doing so, Wolfe has him summon everyone, including Ramsey Muir, Anthony D. Perry, and the Marquis of Clivers, to his office. Once he arrives, the Marquis recognizes Perry instantly — he is Rubber Coleman. Wolfe reveals that Perry, or rather Coleman, swindled the money from the other members of the Rubber Band and used it to fund his numerous business enterprises, only to discover that Clara was pursuing the Rubber Band's claim. Coleman hired her to keep her close and attempted to discourage her from her pursuit, but he framed her for the theft of the $30,000 when he was unable to do so. Although intending to hire Wolfe to cover his tracks and throw suspicion off himself, Coleman had the misfortune to be recognized by Scovil at Wolfe's office, so he murdered him and Walsh to preserve his secret. Coleman staged the phone call that purported to record Walsh's death with the use of a rubber band to simulate a gunshot, thus giving himself an alibi.

Though Coleman is defiant, Wolfe reveals that he has obtained the "receipt" that Coleman used to forge the signatures of the other members of the band when claiming the money from the Marquis; even if by chance he cannot be convicted of murder in New York, this will be sufficient to convict him of fraud in England, which will equally expose and ruin him. Thwarted, Coleman attempts to shoot Wolfe but is gunned down by the Marquis and Archie before he can do so. Having proven Clara's innocence, Wolfe negotiates with the Marquis to claim the remainder of the Band's fair share of his inheritance. Guilt-ridden by the deaths she believes have been caused by her quest, Clara attempts to turn it down, but Wolfe persuades her to accept it.

== The unfamiliar word ==
"Nero Wolfe talks in a way that no human being on the face of the earth has ever spoken, with the possible exception of Rex Stout after he had a gin and tonic," said Michael Jaffe, executive producer of the A&E TV series A Nero Wolfe Mystery. Nero Wolfe's erudite vocabulary is one of the hallmarks of the character. Examples of unfamiliar words — or unfamiliar uses of words that some would otherwise consider familiar — are found throughout the corpus, often in the give-and-take between Wolfe and Archie.

- Usufruct, chapter 5. Before taking Clara Fox as his client, Wolfe ascertains her level of personal involvement with her employers:

Wolfe sighed. "Really, Miss Fox, we are wasting time that may be valuable. Tell me, I beg you, about Mr. Perry and Mr. Muir. Mr. Muir hinted this afternoon that Mr. Perry is enjoying the usufructs of gallantry. Is that true?"
"Of course not." She frowned, and then smiled. "Calling it that, it doesn't sound bad at all, does it? But he isn't."

- Necromancer, chapter 6. Telling his client that no sorcery is responsible for his conclusions, Wolfe says, "I am not a necromancer, Miss Fox."
- Acarpous, chapter 13. Wolfe encounters another twist in the case while speaking to Lord Clivers:

He looked at me. "Confound it, Archie. I have you to thank for this acarpous entanglement."
It was a new one, but I got the idea.

- Weltschmerz, chapter 15. Archie returns to the office to find that Wolfe is in conference with himself:

I would have tried some bulldozing if I thought he was merely dreaming of stuffed quail or pickled pigs' feet, but his lips were moving a little so I knew he was working. I fooled around my desk, went over Johnny's diagrams again in connection with an idea that had occurred to me, checked over Horstmann's reports and entered them in the records, reread the Gazette scoop on the affair at 55th Street, and aggravated myself into such a condition of uselessness that finally, at eleven o'clock sharp, I exploded, "If this keeps up another ten minutes I'll get Weltschmerz!"
Wolfe opened his eyes. "Where in the name of heaven did you get that?"
I threw up my hands. He shut his eyes again.

== Reviews and commentary ==
- Jacques Barzun and Wendell Hertig Taylor, A Catalogue of Crime — In the manner of its time, this early tale is long and brings up past history. ... It starts in New York City with a young woman who is accused of stealing $30,000 from the office where she works. Nero is voluble and Archie in good form. Despite complexity, the tidying up is neat and satisfactory.
- John McAleer, Rex Stout: A Biography — Reviewers were enthusiastic. Yale's perdurable William Lyon Phelps called it "a work of art." Christopher Morley said: "The whole affair is brilliantly handled and gives complete satisfaction." Isaac Anderson [The New York Times] thought it "the peak of his achievements." To Will Cuppy, Wolfe was "the Falstaff of detectives."
- Vincent Starrett — One of his most brilliant and exhilarating performances. Few better mystery stories have been written in our time.
- Robert Van Gelder, The New York Times (April 17, 1936) — Another crackerjack Nero Wolfe story in which a Western promise bobs up later to cause murders and place a beautiful lady in peril. Told by that inimitable Watson, Archie Goodwin. You can't go wrong on this for entertainment.
- The Washington Post — Among the best Wolfe-Archie Goodwin tales; the whole gang makes an appearance — Inspector Cramer, Saul Panzer, etc. — and the writing crackles. A good one to start with for readers unfamiliar with America's shrewdest, orchid-growing, fat, stay-at-home detective.

== Adaptations ==
=== Nero Wolfe (Radiotelevisione italiana S.p.A.) ===
==== Il patto dei sei (1969) ====
The Rubber Band was adapted for a series of Nero Wolfe films produced by the Italian television network RAI (Radiotelevisione Italiana). Written and directed by Giuliana Berlinguer, "Il patto dei sei" aired July 27, 1969.

The series of black-and-white telemovies stars Tino Buazzelli (Nero Wolfe), Paolo Ferrari (Archie Goodwin), Pupo De Luca (Fritz Brenner), Renzo Palmer (Inspector Cramer), Roberto Pistone (Saul Panzer), Mario Righetti (Orrie Cather) and Gianfranco Varetto (Fred Durkin). Other members of the cast of Il patto dei sei include Vittorio Sanipoli (Anthony Perry), Augusto Mastrantoni (Harlan Scoville), Carmen Scarpitta (Clara Fox), Cristina Mascitelli (Hilda Lindquist), Loris Gafforio (Mike Walsh), Sergio Reggi (Sergente Stebbins), Enrico Lazzareschi (Francis Horrocks) and Gastone Bartolucci (Lord Clivers).

==== Il patto dei sei (2012) ====
Roberto Jannone adapted The Rubber Band for the fourth episode of the RAI TV series Nero Wolfe (Italy 2012), starring Francesco Pannofino as Nero Wolfe and Pietro Sermonti as Archie Goodwin. Set in 1959 in Rome, where Wolfe and Archie reside after leaving the United States, the series was produced by Casanova Multimedia and Rai Fiction and directed by Riccardo Donna. "Il patto dei sei" aired April 26, 2012.

== Publication history ==
In 1960, The Rubber Band was published as a Hillman Mystery titled To Kill Again. The book is dedicated, "To RS, my literary agent". (Note: Barbara Tuchman told biographer John McAleer about Rex Stout's "magnificent tirade" when he learned she had a literary agent. He adamantly believed everyone was as capable of handling their own business affairs as he was.) (Note: Archie also refers to Rex Stout as his literary agent in "The Case of the Spies That Weren't", in the January 1966 issue of Ramparts Magazine. When McAleer asked Stout about Archie's dedication of To Kill Again — "To RS, my literary agent" — Stout replied, "I was having fun, I guess.")

- 1936, The Saturday Evening Post, serialized in six issues (February 29, March 7, March 14, March 21, March 28 and April 4)
- 1936, New York: Farrar & Rinehart, April 9, 1936, hardcover

In his limited-edition pamphlet, Collecting Mystery Fiction #9, Rex Stout's Nero Wolfe Part I, Otto Penzler describes the first edition of The Rubber Band: "Turquoise cloth, front cover and spine printed with black; rear cover blank. Issued in a full-color pictorial dust wrapper … The first edition has the publisher's monogram logo on the copyright page. The second printing, in May 1936, is identical to the first except that the logo was dropped."
In April 2006, Firsts: The Book Collector's Magazine estimated that the first edition of The Rubber Band had a value of between $15,000 and $30,000.

- 1937, New York: Grosset and Dunlap, 1937, hardcover
- 1938, London: Cassell, 1938, hardcover
- 1939, Philadelphia: Blakiston, 1939, hardcover
- 1940, New York: Triangle, June 1940, hardcover
- 1943, New York: Pocket Books #208, February 1943, paperback
- 1960, New York: Hillman Books, 1960 (as To Kill Again), paperback
- 1961, New York: Viking, Five of a Kind: The Third Nero Wolfe Omnibus (with In the Best Families and Three Doors to Death), July 10, 1961, hardcover
- 1964, New York: Pyramid (Green Door), August 1964, paperback
- 1995, New York: Bantam Books ISBN 0-553-76309-1 April 1995, trade paperback
- 2006, Auburn, California: The Audio Partners Publishing Corp., Mystery Masters ISBN 1-57270-527-2 April 28, 2006, audio CD (unabridged)
- 2009, New York: Bantam Dell Publishing Group (with The Red Box) ISBN 978-0-553-38603-5 February 24, 2009, paperback
- 2010, New York: Bantam Crimeline ISBN 978-0-307-75615-2 September 8, 2010, e-book
