= Fer-de-Lance (novel) =

Detective novel

- Author: Rex Stout
- Language: English
- Series: Nero Wolfe
- Genre: Detective fiction
- Publisher: Farrar & Rinehart
- Publication date: October 24, 1934
- Publication place: United States
- Media type: Print (Hardcover)
- Pages: 313 pp. (first edition)
- OCLC: 156155600
- Followed by: The League of Frightened Men

Fer-de-Lance by Rex Stout is the first Nero Wolfe detective novel, published in 1934 by Farrar & Rinehart, Inc. The novel appeared in abridged form in The American Magazine (November 1934) under the title "Point of Death". The novel was adapted for the 1936 film Meet Nero Wolfe, and it was named after a venomous snake with the same name. In his seminal 1941 work, Murder for Pleasure, crime fiction historian Howard Haycraft included Fer-de-Lance in his definitive list of the most influential works of mystery fiction.

== Plot introduction ==
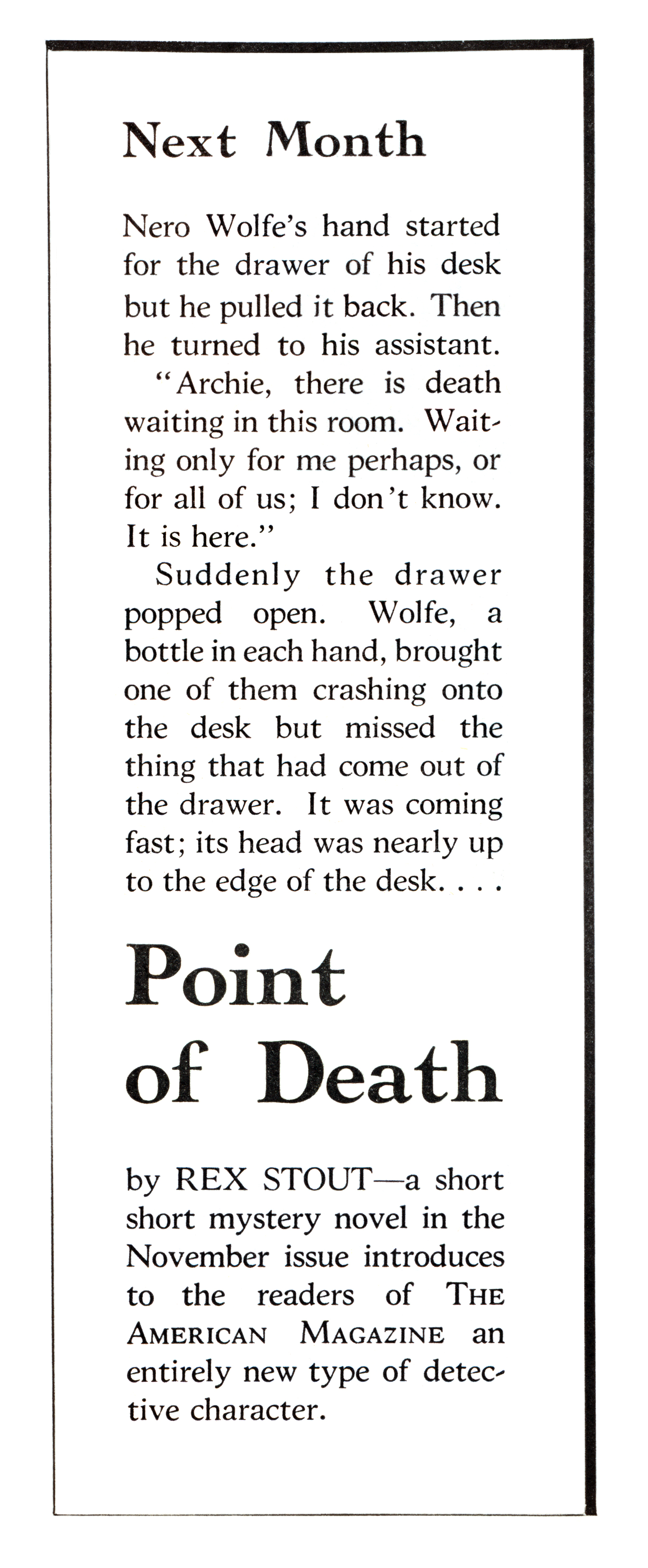

In the opening chapter, Wolfe decides to give up drinking bootleg beer and sends Fritz to purchase samples of every legally available brand (49 in all) so he can select a replacement. The date set in the novel is given as June 7, Wednesday, which makes the year 1933. The Cullen–Harrison Act had just become law on April 7, 1933, legalising "3.2 beer" (3.2% alcohol by weight, approximately 4% alcohol by volume), a point mentioned in passing in the novel.

As Wolfe samples the beers and is surprised to find that none of them are unpalatable, Fred Durkin arrives and asks sheepishly if Wolfe can speak with Maria Maffei, a friend of his wife. Maria's brother Carlo, a metalworker, was unemployed (it was during the Great Depression) and was supposed to return to Italy. He suddenly seemed to come into money, and then disappeared mysteriously. Impressed by Maria Maffei, Wolfe instructs his assistant Archie Goodwin to make enquiries. Wolfe and Goodwin soon learn that Carlo's disappearance somehow involves the death of a college president while playing golf in Westchester County, New York.

As the first novel in the series, Fer-de-Lance introduces Nero Wolfe, Archie Goodwin, Fritz Brenner, Saul Panzer, Fred Durkin, Orrie Cather and other characters who recur throughout the entire corpus. Although the characters are not as fully developed as they would become later in the series, the essential characteristics of Wolfe, Archie and several other regulars already are clearly present.

However, there are some inconsistencies with the characters and settings that would be used thereafter. In particular, the novel's descriptions of Wolfe's Manhattan brownstone conflict with the established architecture set down by Stout in all subsequent novels and stories. Likewise, the characters have slightly different personalities: Wolfe's manner of speaking is notably more baroque and long-winded than in later stories, and Archie is generally coarser and less polished in this work than in later Stout volumes, even using racial epithets at times (something that would continue into the late 1930s before being eliminated). Cramer is noticeably friendlier and much calmer around Wolfe than in future volumes, and Purley Stebbins is similarly not as wary of Archie as he would become. Finally, Orrie Cather is introduced in Fer-de-Lance as a crusty old veteran detective, who chews tobacco; in all future Stout works, he would be a younger, self-confident ladies' man with no tobacco habit.

The story's title is the common name of Bothrops atrox, a venomous South American snake. Fer-de-Lance is French for spearhead, literally iron of the lance.

In Fer-de-Lance, Stout reused a key plot point relating to the murder weapon that he had used in his early mystery The Last Drive, which was serialized in Golfers Magazine in 1916. This story had been forgotten for many years—it is not mentioned in Stout's biography or in bibliographies of his works—until it was rediscovered in 2011.

== Plot summary ==
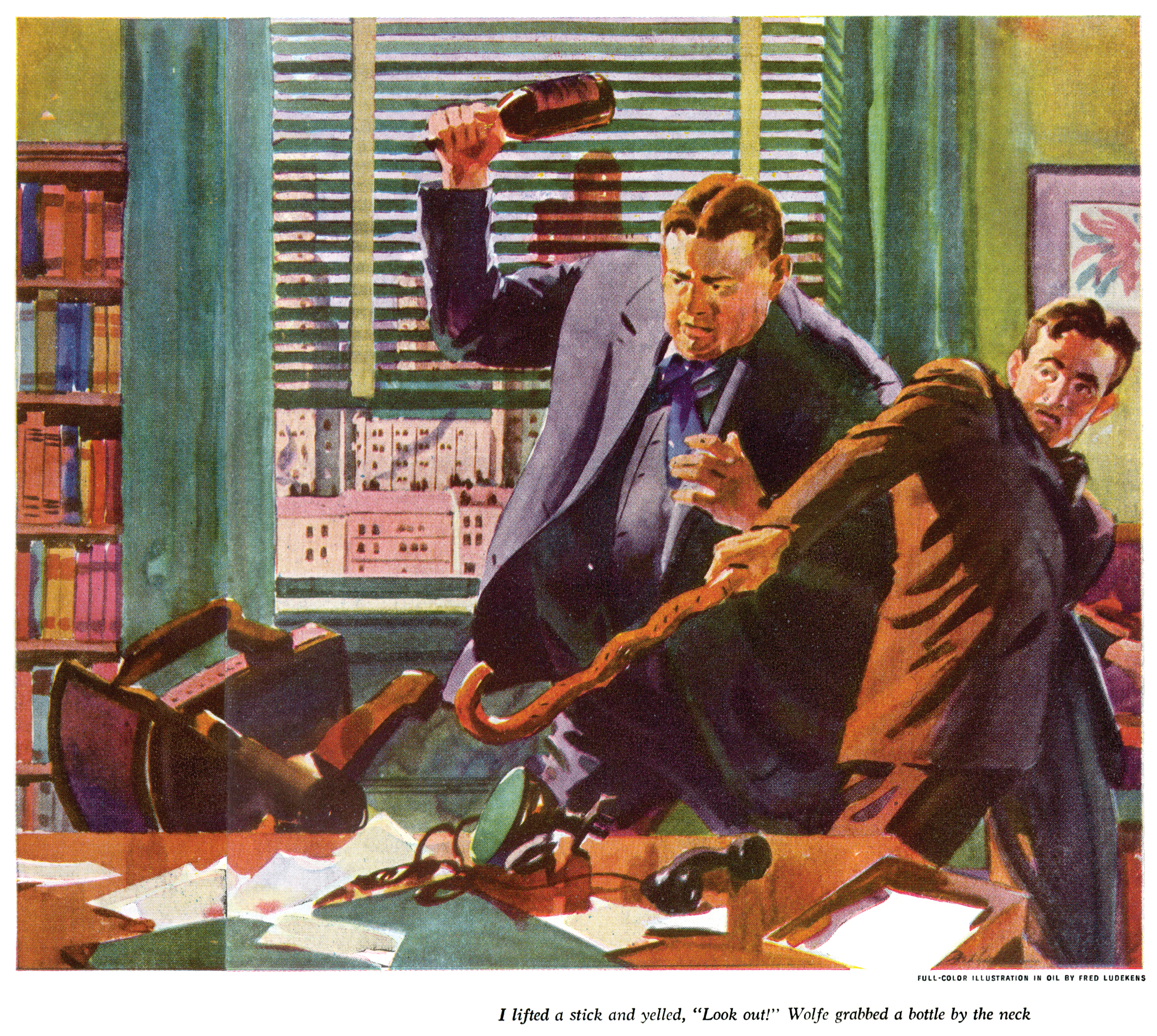
Illustrator Fred Ludekens created the first visual interpretation of Nero Wolfe and Archie Goodwin for the abridged version of Fer-de-Lance that appeared in The American Magazine (November 1934)

Archie, you have heard me say that I am an actor. I am afraid I have a weakness for dramatic statement. It would be foolish not to indulge it when a good opportunity is offered. There is death in this room.

— Nero Wolfe in Fer-de-Lance, chapter 15

Maria Maffei, a family friend of one of Wolfe's free-lance men, offers to hire Wolfe to locate her missing brother Carlo, a metalworker. Wolfe, affected by the Depression, decides to take the job, although it is unappealing to him. Archie locates Anna Fiore, a girl who listened in on a phone call Carlo received at his boarding-house shortly before his disappearance. Wolfe learns from her that Carlo had clipped a story from a copy of The New York Times about the sudden death (apparently by stroke) of Peter Oliver Barstow, president of Holland College. However, Anna refuses to provide any further details about Carlo, who is soon found dead in the countryside, stabbed in the back.

From reading the account of Barstow's death, which occurred during a round of golf, Wolfe conjectures that one of his clubs may have been altered to fire a poisoned needle into his belly. An autopsy proves Wolfe right, and he and Archie begin to concentrate on the Barstow family and their acquaintances, E.D. Kimball and his son Manuel, who had both been part of the golf foursome. While trying to figure out the whereabouts of Barstow's golf bag, Archie learns from the group's caddies that he had borrowed a driver from E.D. during the round. This fact, coupled with E.D.'s accounts of his past in Argentina, leads Wolfe and Archie to conclude that Manuel had intended to kill his father, not Barstow, in revenge for the death of his mother years earlier. Archie confirms Manuel's movements on the day Carlo was killed, making him a suspect in that murder as well. Manuel retaliates by having an associate plant a deadly Bothrops atrox viper in Wolfe's desk drawer, but Wolfe and Archie find and kill it.

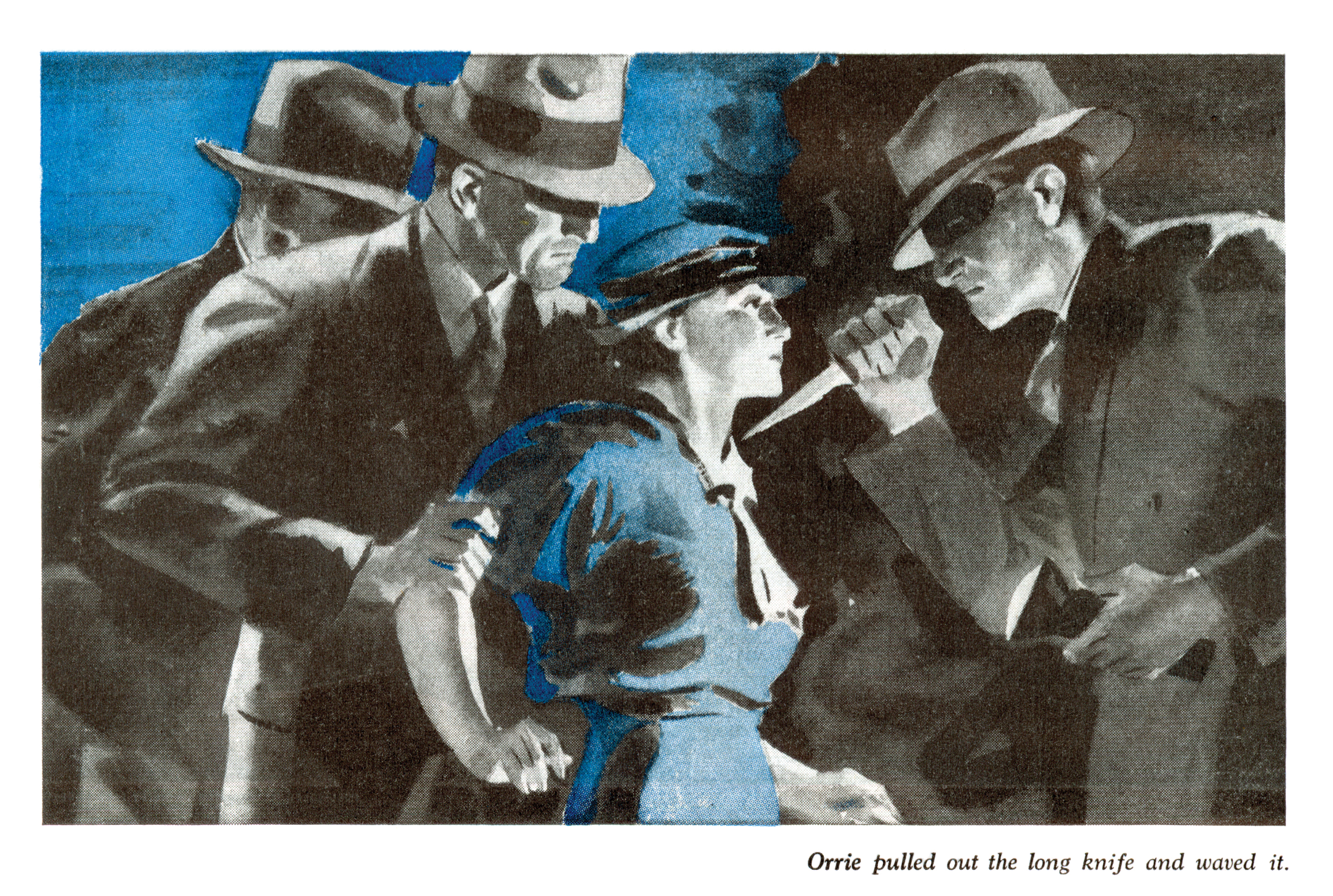

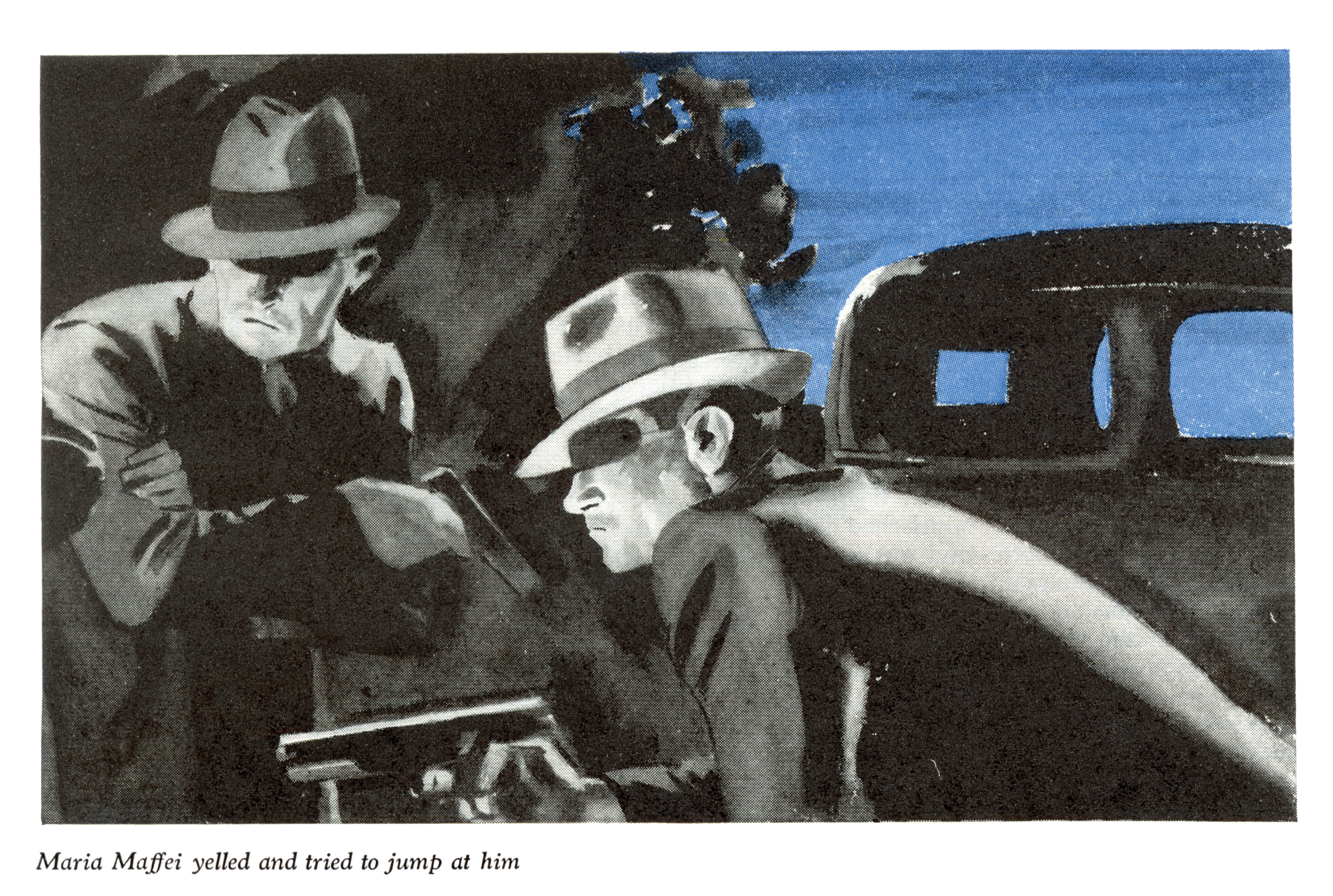

With Maria's cooperation, Wolfe and Archie arrange a robbery in the countryside to scare Anna into telling what she knows. The trick works, and she hands over documents proving that Manuel hired Carlo to build the driver that killed Barstow. With the Kimball estate staked out, and a copy of the evidence delivered to Manuel, Archie leads the local police in so they can make an arrest. They learn that Manuel, an avid pilot, has taken E.D. up for a flight, and are shocked when the plane suddenly nose-dives into the ground; the impact kills both of the Kimballs.

Wolfe collects both the $50,000 reward that Barstow's widow had offered for the capture of his killer, and another $10,000 from a district attorney who had been skeptical of the murder theory. Wolfe comments that the climax of the case gave both E.D. and Manuel a chance to end their lives without any sense of bitterness or despair, but Archie notes that it has also kept Wolfe from having to leave his comfortable house in order to testify at a murder trial.

== Cast of characters ==
- Nero Wolfe — The private investigator
- Archie Goodwin — Wolfe's assistant, and the narrator of all Wolfe stories
- Carlo Maffei — Italian-American metalworker whose disappearance forces Wolfe to begin working
- Maria Maffei — Sister of Carlo Maffei and friend of Fred Durkin's wife
- Peter Oliver Barstow — President of Holland University (fictional), whose bizarre death on a golf course is the key to the mystery
- Lawrence Barstow — Peter Barstow's son, who was with him when he died
- Ellen Barstow — Widow of Peter Barstow
- Sarah Barstow — Peter Barstow's daughter who graduated from Smith College
- E.D. Kimball — Grain broker who was one of the foursome when Barstow died
- Manuel Kimball — E.D. Kimball's son who was also one of the foursome, and also an aviator
- Dr. Nathaniel Bradford — Family physician of the Barstows and friend of Peter since childhood
- Anna Fiore — Cleaning girl at Carlo Maffei's boarding house
- Saul Panzer, Fred Durkin, Orrie Cather and Bill Gore — Freelance detectives employed by Wolfe

== Reviews and commentary ==
- Isaac Anderson, The New York Times Book Review — Several times in the course of this story Nero Wolfe is called a genius. The term is painfully inadequate, but it is the best that the dictionary offers ... The only thing that he does not know at the very beginning is the identity of the murderer. That he is to learn later, and the method he chooses for revealing his knowledge to the authorities provides a sensational concluding chapter for a story that abounds in surprises. Nero Wolfe is so fat that locomotion is next to impossible for him. For his fact-finding he depends upon his secretary, Archie, and it is the latter who tells the tale. The author has done a clever bit of work in making the narrative style employed by Archie correspond so exactly to his character and attainments as they are revealed in little touches here and there throughout the book.
- Jacques Barzun and Wendell Hertig Taylor, A Catalogue of Crime — The first and longest of the Nero Wolfe stories, in which all the familiar characters and their habits get established. The murder is done by means of a golf club—the implement, not the membership—and it entangles a college president, a baby, some Italian nondescripts, and much philosophizing by Wolfe and futilizing by the police.
- Frederick Isaac, In the Beginning: First Novels in Mystery Series — Rex Stout's Fer-de-Lance, then, may be said to have heralded the beginning of several eras. It was, first and foremost, the opening of one of America's best detective series, introducing Nero Wolfe and Archie Goodwin and their world to generations of readers. Second, Archie's presence raises serious questions about the possible roles that the detective's assistant could and should play in the investigative process, some of which remain open even today. ... Third, Wolfe and Archie began to redefine the relationship between the two traditions of the Great Detective and the hard-boiled sleuth. ... By identifying both of these strands and personifying them in Wolfe and Archie, Stout challenged the world of detection to analyze itself. The genre has never been the same since. It was quite a start.
- John McAleer, Rex Stout: A Biography — Justice Oliver Wendell Holmes died on 6 March 1935, at ninety-four. During the last year of his life he read Fer-de-Lance. After his death, a marginal note he had made was found. Carl Van Doren got hold of it and showed it to Rex. It read, "This fellow is the best of them all." Another early and steadfast admirer was William Faulkner. Carvell Collins, whom Faulkner picked as his literary executor, says: "Among the detective fiction Faulkner read — and it was of considerable quantity — he especially liked that by Rex Stout. One of Mr. Stout's novels which was singled out was Fer-de-Lance.
- J. Kenneth Van Dover, At Wolfe's Door — The basic conventions are all in evidence — Wolfe's obesity, immobility, daily routines, elegant diction. Panzer, Durkin, Cather, and Gore debut in supporting roles. Wolfe and Archie engage in typical squabbles; Wolfe is gratuitously and offensively curt to certain callers, and is an irresistible host to others. His ethical standards are unusually idiosyncratic …

== Adaptations ==
=== Meet Nero Wolfe ===
Legendary book designer George Salter produced hundreds of covers for the digest format paperbacks published by Lawrence E. Spivak's The American Mercury. One of the earliest is an abridged version of Fer-de-Lance titled Meet Nero Wolfe (A Mercury Book No. 37, undated, ca. March 1941), which utilizes the title of the 1936 Columbia Pictures adaptation of the novel.

Columbia Pictures adapted the first Nero Wolfe novel for the screen in 1936, as Meet Nero Wolfe. Herbert Biberman directed a cast that included Edward Arnold as Wolfe; Lionel Stander as Archie Goodwin; John Qualen as Olaf, Wolfe's Scandinavian chef; and a young Rita Hayworth (then Rita Cansino) as Maria Maringola, who sets the story in motion when she asks for Wolfe's help in finding her missing brother, Carlo.

In 2002 Scarlet Street magazine revisited the film—little seen in the years after its release — finding it neither the travesty it is sometimes thought to be, nor a faithful recreation of the world of Nero Wolfe. "Judging the film as a film and dismissing questions of fidelity to the source material, Meet Nero Wolfe is an above average minor A picture, a solid mystery, and unfailingly entertaining," the magazine reported. "No, at bottom, it's not Rex Stout's Nero and Archie, but it's a well-developed mystery (thanks to Stout's plot) with compensations all its own—and an interesting piece of Wolfeana."

=== Nero Wolfe (Radiotelevisione italiana S.p.A.) ===
On April 5, 2012, the RAI network in Italy began a Nero Wolfe television series starring Francesco Pannofino as Nero Wolfe and Pietro Sermonti as Archie Goodwin. Produced by Casanova Multimedia and Rai Fiction, the eight-episode first season opened with "La traccia del serpente," an adaptation of Fer-de-Lance set in 1959 in Rome, where Wolfe and Archie reside after leaving the United States. Additional cast include Andy Luotto as Wolfe's chef, Nanni Laghi; Giulia Bevilacqua as reporter Rosa Petrini; and Dajana Roncione as Anna Fiore. The story was adapted by Piero Bodrato; Riccardo Donna directed.

== Publication history ==
- 1934, The American Magazine, abridged as "Point of Death," November 1934
- 1934, New York: Farrar & Rinehart, October 24, 1934, hardcover
  In his limited-edition pamphlet, Collecting Mystery Fiction #9, Rex Stout's Nero Wolfe Part I, Otto Penzler describes the "notoriously rare" first edition of Fer-de-Lance: "Black cloth, front cover and spine stamped with gold lettering; rear cover blank. Issued in a mainly black, pink and green pictorial dust wrapper … As is true of all the Nero Wolfe novels published by Farrar & Rinehart, the first edition may be identified by the appearance of the publisher's monogram logo on the copyright page. If no logo appears on the copyright page the book is a later printing."
  Farrar & Rinehart issued a second printing in December 1934, and a third printing in October 1935.
  In April 2006, Firsts: The Book Collector's Magazine estimated that the first edition of Fer-de-Lance had a value of $15,000 and up. The estimate is for a copy in very good to fine condition in a like dustjacket.
- 1934, Toronto: Oxford University Press, 1934, hardcover
- 1934, Brooklyn, NY: Junior Book Club, 1934, hardcover
- 1935, London: Cassell, 1935, hardcover
- 1936, New York: Grosset and Dunlap, June 1936, hardcover
- 1941, New York: Lawrence E. Spivak, Mercury Mystery #37, ca. March 1941, not dated, abridged as "Meet Nero Wolfe," digest paperback
- 1941, New York: Pocket Books #112, July 1941, paperback
- 1953, Verdict, June–October 1953, paperback
- 1955, London: Penguin, 1955, paperback
- 1958, New York: Dell Great Mystery Library D223, March 1958, paperback
- 1964, New York: Pyramid (Green Door), February 1964, paperback
- 1965, New York: Viking, Royal Flush (with Murder by the Book and Three Witnesses), July 23, 1965, hardcover
- 1970, London: Hamish Hamilton, hardcover
- 1976, New York: Pyramid Books, paperback
- 1983, New York: Bantam Books, paperback
- 1984, New York: Bantam Books, paperback, 50th Anniversary Edition, with a foreword by Ellen E. Krieger and "Nero Wolfe: A Retrospective" by John McAleer
- 1992, New York: Bantam Crimeline ISBN 0-553-27819-3 February 1992, paperback, Rex Stout Library edition with introduction by Loren D. Estleman and back matter including a reprint of Rex Stout's confidential memo of September 15, 1949, describing Nero Wolfe, Archie Goodwin and Wolfe's office
- 1998, New York: Otto Penzler Books (Otto Penzler's First Edition Library) ISBN 1-883402-17-4, February 1998, hardcover (facsimile first edition)
- 2004, Auburn, California: The Audio Partners Publishing Corp., Mystery Masters ISBN 1-57270-388-1, May 2004, audio CD (unabridged, read by Michael Prichard)
- 2008, New York: Bantam Dell Publishing Group (with The League of Frightened Men) ISBN 0-553-38545-3, June 2008, paperback
- 2010, New York: Bantam Crimeline ISBN 978-0-307-75592-6, July 21, 2010, e-book
