= The Red Box =

1937 novel by Rex Stout

- Author: Rex Stout
- Cover artist: Winifred E. Lefferts
- Language: English
- Series: Nero Wolfe
- Genre: Detective fiction
- Publisher: Farrar & Rinehart
- Publication date: April 15, 1937
- Publication place: United States
- Media type: Print (Hardcover)
- Pages: 298 pp. (first edition)
- OCLC: 1830354
- Preceded by: The Rubber Band
- Followed by: Too Many Cooks

The Red Box is the fourth Nero Wolfe detective novel by Rex Stout. Prior to its first publication in 1937 by Farrar & Rinehart, Inc., the novel was serialized in five issues of The American Magazine (December 1936 – April 1937). Adapted twice for Italian television, The Red Box is the first Nero Wolfe story to be adapted for the American stage.

== Plot introduction ==
I never knew a plaguier case. We have all the knowledge we need, and not a shred of presentable evidence. Unless the red box is found—are we actually going to be forced to send Saul to Scotland or Spain or both? Good heavens! Are we so inept that we must half encircle the globe to demonstrate the motive and the technique of a murder that happened in our own office in front of our eyes? Pfui!

— Nero Wolfe in The Red Box, chapter 14

Wolfe and Archie investigate the death of a model who ate a piece of poisoned candy. One of the suspects begs Wolfe to handle his estate and especially the contents of a certain red box. Wolfe is at first concerned about a possible conflict of interest, but feels unable to refuse when the man dies in his office before telling Wolfe where to find the red box. The police naturally think that he told Wolfe somewhat more before dying.

This novel presents the series' first instance of a murder taking place in Wolfe's office.

== Plot summary ==
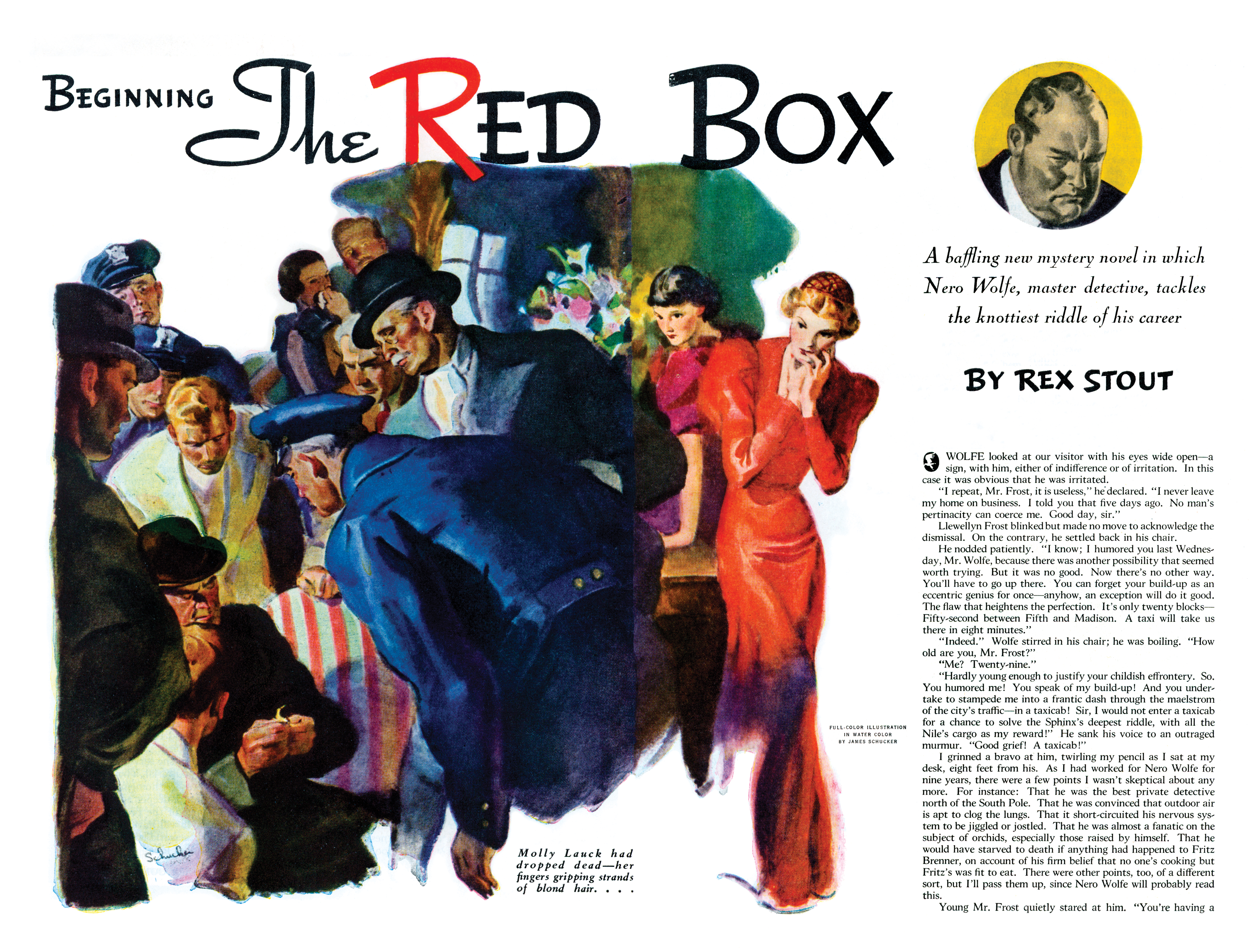
James Schucker illustrated The Red Box for its appearance in five issues of The American Magazine, beginning in December 1936.

Molly Lauck, a beautiful model, has died after eating a poisoned Jordan almond, and wealthy socialite Llewellyn Frost has hired Nero Wolfe to investigate the case. His true purpose, however, is to ensure that his ortho-cousin Helen is freed from the employment of Boyden McNair, the owner of the fashion boutique where Lauck died. He pressures Wolfe to leave his home and investigate the crime scene directly, producing a letter signed by the directors of the Metropolitan Orchid Show urging him to do so. Although highly reluctant, Wolfe eventually relents and travels to the boutique with Llewellyn and Archie Goodwin.

Wolfe and Archie interview McNair, who is noticeably ill and distressed by recent events, and several of the models, including Helen Frost. Although the interview is apparently unhelpful, Wolfe is intrigued when Helen indicates that she knew the contents of the chocolate box containing the candy that killed Lauck despite claiming to have never seen it before. Llewellyn, who has romantic feelings for his cousin and believes that Wolfe intends to incriminate her, tries to terminate his contract with Wolfe. Outraged by his actions, Wolfe refuses to drop the matter without being paid his full fee, despite being pressured by both Helen's mother Calida and Llewellyn's blustering father Dudley.

Intrigued by Wolfe investigating a crime scene personally, Inspector Cramer tries to find out what Wolfe has learned. Although Wolfe offers him little, he does suggest that Cramer and Archie gather the people of interest in the case and, one-by-one, offer them a chocolate from a box similar to that which contained the poisoned item that killed Molly Lauck. Making note of who selects what, Archie notes that Boyden McNair’s response is different from the others: he initially goes to select a Jordan almond, as the victim did, but then reacts skittishly and chooses something else. Wolfe and Archie also learn that Boyden McNair displays a particular fondness towards Helen, apparently due to her resemblance to his own long-dead daughter.

Boyden McNair meets with Wolfe and confesses that, as the chocolate box had been intended for him, he believes someone is trying to murder him. Although he refuses to identify a suspect, McNair reveals that he has made Wolfe the executor of his estate and has willed to him a red leather box containing papers relating to a shameful incident in his past. Before he can reveal any more, however, he is killed in front of Wolfe and Archie by a poisoned aspirin. Although this voids Wolfe's original contract, Helen hires Wolfe to locate McNair's murderer.

Wolfe determines that the red box will most likely reveal the culprit and orders it found. As executor of McNair’s estate, Wolfe sends Saul Panzer, Orrie Cather, Fred Durkin, and Johnny Keems to McNair’s cottage in the country to search the grounds for the box with orders to keep the police out should they attempt to interfere. Wolfe learns that Helen is the heir to the Frost family fortune, which is held in a trust managed by Dudley Frost until her 21st birthday, but if anything were to happen to her, it would instead go to Llewellyn Frost.

Later that night, the operatives at the cottage catch Perren Gebert, a family friend of the Frosts with designs of marrying Helen, trying to break in. Archie is sent to collect Gebert and bring him to Wolfe for questioning, but before he can, the authorities arrive to search for the red box. Archie manages to prevent them from doing so but is forced to surrender Gebert to their custody. While the police are unable to get any useful information from Gebert, Cramer reveals to Archie that Gebert has been receiving monthly payments of $1,000 from Helen Frost’s trust fund. The next night, after being released from custody, Gebert is murdered with a nitrobenzene trap set in his car.

A package arrives for Wolfe that prompts him to summon the main players to his office. Once everyone has arrived, Wolfe reveals that he has discovered that Helen Frost is in fact Glenna McNair, the daughter of Boyden McNair. The real Helen Frost was the child who had died years before, but Calida Frost bought Glenna from the then-impoverished Boyden McNair and raised her as Helen in order to eventually control the inheritance. Bitterly regretting what he had done ever since, McNair proceeded to make his fortune, formed an attachment with Glenna, and planned to reveal the truth to her, but Calida killed him to prevent this. Perren Gebert was also murdered because he knew of the arrangement and had been blackmailing Calida to support his plan to marry Glenna.

Wolfe produces the red box that he claims holds the proof of his accusations. In fact, it is a mock-up containing a bottle of cyanide that Calida Frost uses to commits suicide. The actual red box is eventually found in Boyden McNair’s boyhood home in Scotland with plenty of evidence to support Wolfe’s theories, but, as Archie notes, "by that time Calida Frost was already buried."

== The unfamiliar word ==
"Nero Wolfe talks in a way that no human being on the face of the earth has ever spoken, with the possible exception of Rex Stout after he had a gin and tonic," said Michael Jaffe, executive producer of the A&E TV series, A Nero Wolfe Mystery. Nero Wolfe's erudite vocabulary is one of the hallmarks of the character. Examples of unfamiliar words—or unfamiliar uses of words that some would otherwise consider familiar—are found throughout the corpus, often in the give-and-take between Wolfe and Archie.

- Ortho-cousin, chapter 1. Wolfe to Archie:

More transparent was the reason for Mr. Frost's familiarity with so strange a term as 'ortho-cousin,' strictly a word for an anthropologist, though it leaves room for various speculations. ... Ortho-cousins are those whose parents are of the same sex—the children of two brothers or of two sisters; whereas cross-cousins are those whose parents are brother and sister. In some tribes cross-cousins may marry, but not ortho-cousins. Obviously Mr. Frost has investigated the question thoroughly.

- Spiff, chapter 3. Archie:

He [Llewllyn Frost] stopped, smiling from Wolfe to me and back again like a haberdasher's clerk trying to sell an old number with a big spiff on it.

- Yclept, chapter 8. Archie:

Boyden McNair, with his right elbow on his knee and his bent head resting on the hand which covered his eyes, sat near Wolfe's desk in the dunce's chair, yclept that by me on the day that District Attorney Anderson of Westchester sat in it while Wolfe made a dunce of him.

== Reviews and commentary ==
- Jacques Barzun and Wendell Hertig Taylor, A Catalogue of Crime — Stout rarely has Nero Wolfe lured away from home on a case, but in this one Archie does it with orchids. Poisoning at a fashion show is the crime that Wolfe's method of exhaustive interrogation mixed with bluff is involved to solve. Archie is thinner and less amusing here than elsewhere, but we learn more about Wolfe from himself.
- Clifton Fadiman, The New Yorker — Nero Wolfe leaves his orchids for the first time to solve the case of the poisoned fashion model. This one has practically everything the seasoned addict demands in the way of characters and action; you may guess the motive, but the mechanism is properly obscure.
- Edmund Wilson wrote that the novel was "somewhat padded ... full of long episodes that led nowhere," and left him with the feeling that he "had to unpack large crates by swallowing the excelsior in order to find at the bottom a few bent and rusty nails."

=== The New Yorker ===
The Red Box was the subject of a squib in the September 28, 1946, issue of The New Yorker magazine:

The 1946 Avon paperback reissue of The Red Box drew the attention of The New Yorker, which listed 17 instances of Wolfe's finger-wiggling (September 28, 1946)

INFATUATION WITH SOUND OF
OWN WORDS DEPARTMENT
(FINGER-WIGGLING DIVISION)
[From "The Red Box," by Rex Stout]
Wolfe wiggled a finger at her. —Page 29.
Wolfe wiggled a finger at him. —Page 31.
He wiggled a finger at Frost. —Page 34.
Wolfe wiggled a finger at him. —Page 45.
Wolfe wiggled a finger. —Page 51.
Wolfe wiggled a finger at him. —Page 104.
Wolfe wiggled a finger at him. —Page 110.
Wolfe wiggled a finger at him. —Page 130.
He wiggled Fritz away with a finger. —Page 142.
Wolfe wiggled a finger at her. —Page 144.
He wiggled a finger at me. —Page 193.
Wolfe wiggled a finger at her. —Page 218.
Wolfe wiggled a finger. —Page 231.
Wolfe wiggled a finger. —Page 237.
Wolfe wiggled a finger at him. —Page 239.
Wolfe wiggled a finger at her. —Page 245.
Wolfe wiggled a finger at him. —Page 255.

"The finical attention of The New Yorker magazine" was noted by critic David Langford in a 1992 article for Million magazine. "It is my impression that Wolfe never again deployed his wiggling finger so often in a single book," Langford wrote.

== Adaptations ==
=== Television ===
==== Nero Wolfe (Radiotelevisione italiana S.p.A.) ====
===== Veleno in sartoria (1969) =====
The Red Box was adapted for the premier program in a series of Nero Wolfe films produced by the Italian television network RAI. Directed by Giuliana Berlinguer from a teleplay by Belisario L. Randone, "Veleno in sartoria" aired February 21, 1969.

The series of black-and-white telemovies stars Tino Buazzelli (Nero Wolfe), Paolo Ferrari (Archie Goodwin), Pupo De Luca (Fritz Brenner), Renzo Palmer (Inspector Cramer), Roberto Pistone (Saul Panzer). Other members of the cast of "Veleno in sartoria" include Carla Gravina (Helen Frost), Marisa Bartoli (Thelma Mitchell), Cecilia Todeschini (Molly Lauck), Andrea Lala (Lew Frost), Aroldo Tieri (Boyden McNair), Barbara Landi (Signora Lamont), Raffaele Giangrande (Dudley Frost), Marina Berti (Callie Frost) and Massimo Serato (Claude Gebert).

===== La scatola rossa (2012) =====
Piero Bodrato adapted The Red Box for the seventh episode of the RAI TV series Nero Wolfe (Italy 2012), starring Francesco Pannofino as Nero Wolfe and Pietro Sermonti as Archie Goodwin. Set in 1959 in Rome, where Wolfe and Archie reside after leaving the United States, the series was produced by Casanova Multimedia and Rai Fiction and directed by Riccardo Donna. "La scatola rossa" aired May 17, 2012.

=== Stage ===
==== The Red Box (2014) ====
Park Square Theatre in Saint Paul, Minnesota, commissioned a world-premiere stage adaption of The Red Box, presented June 6 – July 13, 2014 (previews beginning May 30). Written by Joseph Goodrich and directed by Peter Moore, the two-act production starred E.J. Subkoviak (Nero Wolfe), Sam Pearson (Archie Goodwin), Michael Paul Levin (Inspector Cramer), Jim Pounds (Fritz Brenner, Rene Gebert), Nicholas Leeman (Lew Frost), Rebecca Wilson (Helen Frost), Suzanne Egli (Calida Frost), James Cada (Dudley Frost) and Bob Malos (Boyden McNair).

"For audiences who might not be familiar with Wolfe and his trusty assistant Archie Goodwin, it's a terrific introduction to the characters and the milieu," wrote the Saint Paul Pioneer Press.

The stage production was authorized by the estate of Rex Stout; Stout's daughter, Rebecca Stout Bradbury, attended the opening. "It’s something of a surprise that none of the Wolfe novels have been adapted for the stage before," wrote the Twin Cities Daily Planet. "If The Red Box is any indication, many more will be."

== Publication history ==
With a dust jacket by illustrator Eric Fraser, the British first edition of The Red Box was the last Nero Wolfe book published by Cassell (1937)

- 1936, The American Magazine, serialized in five issues (December 1936 – April 1937)
- 1937, New York: Farrar & Rinehart, April 15, 1937, hardcover

In his limited-edition pamphlet, Collecting Mystery Fiction #9, Rex Stout's Nero Wolfe Part I, Otto Penzler describes the first edition of The Red Box: "Gray cloth, front cover and spine printed with red; rear cover blank. Issued in a mainly black, gray, red and white pictorial dust wrapper … The first edition has the publisher's monogram logo on the copyright page."
In April 2006, Firsts: The Book Collector's Magazine estimated that the first edition of The Red Box had a value of between $15,000 and $30,000.

- 1937, Toronto: Oxford University Press, 1937, hardcover
- 1937, London: Cassell, 1937, hardcover
- 1937, New York: Grosset and Dunlap, 1937, hardcover
- 1943, New York: Avon Murder Mystery Monthly #9,1943, paperback
- 1944, Cleveland, Ohio: World Publishing Company, The Nero Wolfe Omnibus (with The League of Frightened Men), January 1944, hardcover
- 1946, New York: Avon 82, published by special arrangement with Farrar & Rinehart Inc. Rare paperback; subject of a squib in the September 28, 1946, issue of The New Yorker magazine
- 1957, London: Penguin #1175, 1957, paperback
- 1958, New York: Avon #T-216, 1958, as The Case of the Red Box, paperback
- 1964, New York: Pyramid (Green Door) #R-983, March 1964, paperback
- 1976, London: Severn House, 1976, hardcover
- 1979, New York: Jove #M-5117, July 1979, paperback
- 1992, New York: Bantam Crimeline ISBN 0-553-24919-3 January 1, 1992, paperback
- 1992, London: Scribners ISBN 0-356-20109-0, hardcover
- 1994, Burlington, Ontario: Durkin Hayes Publishing, DH Audio ISBN 0-88646-377-7, audio cassette (abridged, read by Saul Rubinek)
- 1995, Auburn, California: The Audio Partners Publishing Corp., Mystery Masters ISBN 1-57270-053-X June 1995, audio cassette (unabridged, read by Michael Prichard)
- 2009, New York: Bantam Dell Publishing Group (with The Rubber Band) ISBN 978-0-553-38603-5 February 24, 2009, paperback
- 2011, New York: Bantam Crimeline ISBN 978-0-307-76817-9 August 17, 2011, e-book
