= The Music Goes 'Round =

1936 film by Victor Schertzinger

- Directed by: Victor Schertzinger
- Written by: Sidney Buchman; Joseph Moncure March; George Marion Jr.; Jo Swerling
- Starring: Harry Richman; Rochelle Hudson; Walter Connolly
- Cinematography: Joseph Walker
- Edited by: Gene Milford
- Music by: Howard Jackson
- Production company: Columbia Pictures
- Distributed by: Columbia Pictures
- Release date: February 27, 1936
- Running time: 86 minutes
- Country: United States
- Language: English

The Music Goes 'Round is a 1936 American musical comedy film directed by Victor Schertzinger and starring Harry Richman, Rochelle Hudson and Walter Connolly. It was produced and distributed by Columbia Pictures. A remake of the 1928 Columbia production The Matinee Idol

== Plot ==
A famed Broadway star is taking a trip on a Mississippi steamer when he encounters an acting troupe performing aboard. They audition him for a place in the troupe, not realizing who he is. He finds their melodramatic show so bad that he arranges for it to be transferred to Broadway for a new revue, knowing that it will be a huge comedy hit there. However his feelings are complicated by his falling in love with the troupe's leading lady.

== Cast ==
- Harry Richman as Harry Wallace
- Rochelle Hudson as Susanna Courtney
- Walter Connolly as Hector Courtney
- Douglass Dumbrille as Bishop
- Lionel Stander as O'Casey
- Henry Mollison as Stephen Grey
- Etienne Girardot as Brewster
- Walter Kingsford as Cobham
- Wyrley Birch as Josh
- Victor Kilian as Marshall
- Dora Early as Eleanora Stubbs
- Edward Farley as Edward Farley - Song Writer
- Mike Riley as Mike Riley - Song Writer
- Gene Morgan as Nelson
- Eddie 'Rochester' Anderson as Lucifer
- Al Herman as Stage Manager
- John Mack as Manager

== Bibliography ==
- James Monaco. The Encyclopedia of Film. Perigee Books, 1991.
