= Bridal Suite =

1939 film by Wilhelm Thiele

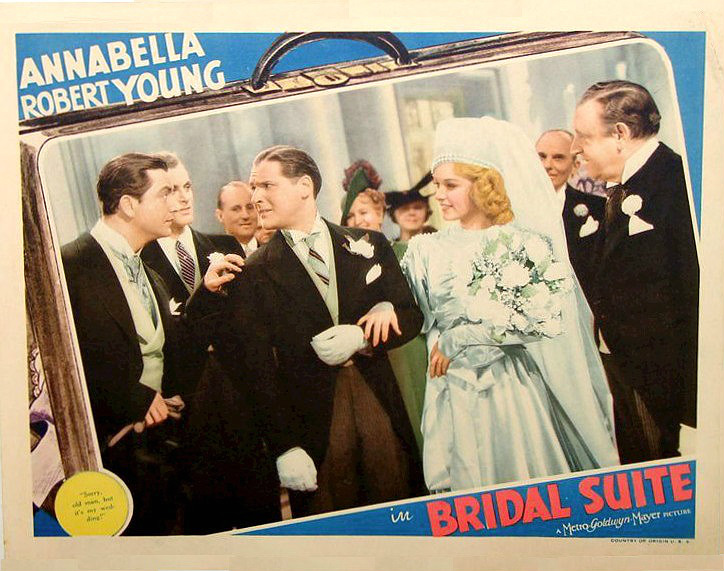
- Lobby card
- Directed by: Wilhelm Thiele
- Screenplay by: Samuel Hoffenstein
- Story by: Gottfried Reinhardt; Virginia Faulkner
- Produced by: Edgar Selwyn
- Starring: Annabella; Robert Young; Walter Connolly; Reginald Owen; Gene Lockhart; Arthur Treacher
- Cinematography: Clyde De Vinna
- Edited by: Frank E. Hull
- Music by: Daniele Amfitheatrof
- Production company: Metro-Goldwyn-Mayer
- Distributed by: Metro-Goldwyn-Mayer
- Release date: May 26, 1939
- Running time: 70 minutes
- Country: United States
- Language: English

Bridal Suite is a 1939 American Metro-Goldwyn-Mayer B movie comedy film directed by Wilhelm Thiele and written by Samuel Hoffenstein. The film stars Annabella, Robert Young, Walter Connolly, Reginald Owen, Gene Lockhart, Arthur Treacher and was the debut of Robert Blake, who played an uncredited role as a child.

Originally titled Maiden Voyage, the film was retitled Bridal Suite to coincide with Annabella's recent marriage to Tyrone Power. It was released on May 26, 1939.

== Plot ==
Neil McGill, a wealthy and spoiled American playboy, who is engaged to his fiancée, Abbie, becomes attracted to Luise Anzengruber, a poor innkeeper, at a Swiss chalet, which he is visiting with his mother. Neil and his mother conspire to meet renown psychiatrist Dr. Grauer to obtain a medical certificate explaining why Neil jilted Abbie after oversleeping after his bachelor party.

When Luise finds Neil's advances as inappropriate, she rebuffs him and goes on a hike in the mountains with Dr. Grauer. Luise and the doctor are stranded and Neil searches for them. Neil finds the pair, but is also stranded after an avalanche. Luise warms up to Neil and the three are rescued.

Upon their return to the chalet, Neil tells Dr. Grauer he wants to marry Luise, but has not told his mother his intentions. Dr. Grauer warns him that his marriage to Luise would require him to put away his playboy lifestyle in exchange for hard work. When Neil says he has nothing to offer Luise but his charm, Dr. Grauer convinces him to forget marrying Luise and return to America.

Neil's mother makes plans for Neil and Abbie to marry on the ship, but Luise unexpectedly shows up. Luise discovers Neil and Abbie's plans and leaves. Neil confesses his love for Luise to Abbie. Abbie replies she intends to marry him and take him for everything he's got. Neil pursues Luise who runs away from him. Neil's attempt to stop her results in a fight breaking out with bystanders. When the ship arrives, Neil's parents are exasperated that Neil, once again, has run away from marriage.

Storming in to Neil's room, they discover Neil in bed with Luise, who is now his wife. Neil's father, with Luise's insistence, offers him a job in his business as a shipping clerk, which Neil happily accepts.

== Cast ==
- Annabella as Luise Anzengruber
- Robert Young as Neil McGill
- Walter Connolly as Doctor Grauer
- Reginald Owen as Sir Horace Bragdon
- Gene Lockhart as Cornelius McGill
- Arthur Treacher as Lord Helfer
- Billie Burke as Mrs. McGill
- Virginia Field as Abbie Bragdon
- Felix Bressart as Maxl
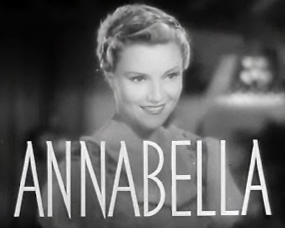
Annabella

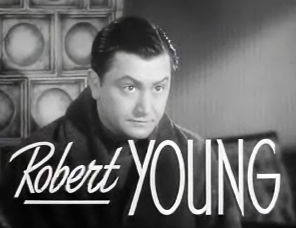
Robert Young

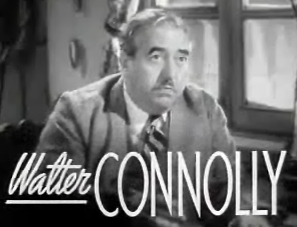
Walter Connolly

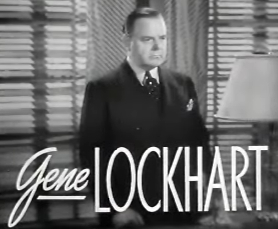
Gene Lockhart

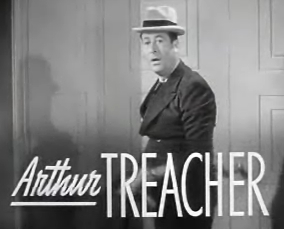
Arthur Treacher

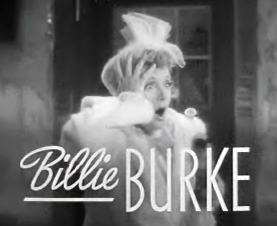
Billie Burke
