= White Lies (1934 film) =

1934 film

- Directed by: Leo Bulgakov
- Written by: Harold Shumate
- Starring: Victor Jory; Fay Wray; Walter Connolly
- Cinematography: Benjamin H. Kline
- Edited by: Otto Meyer
- Distributed by: Columbia Pictures
- Release date: December 27, 1934
- Running time: 63 minutes
- Country: United States
- Language: English

White Lies is a 1934 American crime film directed by Leo Bulgakov and starring Victor Jory, Fay Wray, and Walter Connolly.

The film was produced by Columbia Pictures. The screenwriter was Harold Shumate.

The film is featured in the book A Guide to American Crime Films of the Thirties.

== Plot ==
A "ruthless newspaper proprietor who sacrifices everything to have sensational headlines, is put to the test when his daughter is accused of murder."

== Cast ==
- Victor Jory as Terry Condon
- Fay Wray as Joan Mitchell
- Walter Connolly as John Mitchell
- Leslie Fenton as Dan Oliver
- Irene Hervey as Mary Mollory
- Robert Allen as Arthur Bradford
- William Demarest as Roberts
- Oscar Apfel
