= Winifred E. Lefferts =

- Winifred Lefferts Arms, philanthropist
- Born: Winifred Earl Lefferts; October 9, 1903; Newtonville, Massachusetts
- Died: November 16, 1995 (aged 92); Blandford, Massachusetts
- Education: Pratt Institute Art School; National Academy of Design; Tiffany Foundation
- Known for: Painting; design; philanthropy
- Spouses: Carleton Macy (married 1937–1949); Robert A. Arms (married 1952–1971)

Winifred Earl Lefferts (October 9, 1903, Newtonville, Massachusetts – November 16, 1995, Blandford, Massachusetts), also known as Winifred Lefferts Arms, was a painter, designer and philanthropist. A member of the Lefferts family, early settlers of Brooklyn, she studied and exhibited art, and designed for New York book publishers prior to her 1937 marriage to Carleton Macy. Following her marriage to Robert A. Arms in 1952, she painted as Winifred L. Arms. After the death of her second husband, she became known for philanthropy and for founding a private residential treatment center in Carmel, New York, named Arms Acres.

== Biography ==
The daughter of Oscar Leffert Lefferts and Winifred Wood, Winifred Earl Lefferts was born into a socially prominent family. Her mother was descended from Francis Fauquier, Colonial lieutenant governor of Virginia, and Major Nathan Peters of Connecticut, aide to General George Washington. Through her father Lefferts was descended from Oliver Wolcott, one of the signers of the Declaration of Independence; Matthew Griswold, governor of Connecticut; and Pieter Lefferts, an early Dutch settler of Brooklyn.

Winifred Lefferts studied at the Pratt Institute Art School and the National Academy of Design in New York. She won a fellowship from the Louis Comfort Tiffany Foundation in 1925, and received prizes from the National Arts Club in 1931, 1933 and 1936. She held membership in the National Association of Women Painters and Sculptors, the New York Watercolor Club, the American Watercolor Society and the Allied Artists of America.

On October 30, 1937, Lefferts married Carleton Macy, a leading developer of Long Island real estate who was former president of the Queens Borough Gas and Electric Company. Macy's first wife, Lefferts' paternal aunt Helen, had died the previous year.

Arms visits the town hall she gave her hometown of Blandford, Massachusetts. She was cited in a 1983 U.S. News & World Report feature about publicity-shy individuals who were carrying on the philanthropic tradition of their prosperous families.

Macy died in January 1949, and in September 1952 his widow married Robert A. Arms, who was employed by the Travelers Insurance Company of Hartford and was descended from John Alden. The couple dedicated their lives to helping those with chemical dependency. After her husband was killed by a drunk driver in 1971, Winifred L. Arms continued her work to help alcoholics to recovery and established a private inpatient treatment facility in Carmel, New York, named Arms Acres.

Arms' acts of philanthropy included giving a 100-acre parcel in Massachusetts to the New England Forestry Foundation in 1972. Formerly Stage West, CityStage & Symphony Hall in Springfield, Massachusetts, named its 83-seat black box theater, The Winifred Arms Studio, in her honor.

In 1982 Arms bought a run-down building in her hometown of Blandford, Massachusetts, had it renovated, and presented it as the first town hall Blandford had ever had in its 241-year history. "As it is now all the papers and records of the town are kept in private homes. It kind of makes your hair stand on end," Arms told a UPI reporter, describing the absence of a permanent meeting place as "a pea-picking horror."

Her gifts to Amherst College, Robert Arms' alma mater, included an endowed professorship in the arts and humanities and a painting by Rockwell Kent, "Clover Fields" (1939–1940), that is part of the collection of the Mead Art Museum. The Five College Museums/Historic Deerfield Collections Database reflects Winifred Lefferts Arms' donation of more than six dozen pieces of furniture and decorative arts objects dating to the 18th century, as well as paintings and prints and two of her own watercolor drawings.

Winifred Lefferts Arms continued her membership in the American Watercolor Society until her death on November 16, 1995. In 1997, Amherst College named The Arms Music Center in memory of Winifred and Robert Arms.

== Work ==
Lefferts' original dust jacket art for The League of Frightened Men (1935).

Lefferts illustrated books and designed dust jackets for American book publishers in the 1920s and 1930s. Books that credit her as illustrator include Elaine Sterne Carrington's The Gypsy Star (1928) and Laura E. Richards' 1935 book of children's verses, Merry-Go-Round. Lefferts' name or her distinctive "W.E.L." signature appears on many book jackets, including the U.S. edition of W. Somerset Maugham's The Casuarina Tree (1926), DuBose Heyward's Angel (1926) and M. P. Shiel's Dr. Krasinski's Secret (1929).

Lefferts designed the dust jacket for Rex Stout's first book, How Like a God (1929), and the covers for Seed on the Wind (1930) and three of his early Nero Wolfe novels—The League of Frightened Men (1935), The Rubber Band (1936) and The Red Box (1937). In December 2015, the only example of Lefferts' original dust jacket art ever auctioned was offered by Bonhams in New York. Measuring 12 by 10.5 inches, her design for the cover of The League of Frightened Men was executed in gouache, ink and pencil on artist board. The original advertising mockup for The Red Box, including a silkscreen print of Leffert's dust jacket design, has also been offered for sale.
