= The Great Victor Herbert =

1939 American musical film

- Film poster
- Directed by: Andrew L. Stone
- Written by: Russel Crouse; Robert Lively; Andrew L. Stone
- Produced by: Andrew L. Stone
- Starring: Allan Jones; Mary Martin; Walter Connolly
- Cinematography: Victor Milner
- Edited by: James Smith
- Distributed by: Paramount Pictures
- Release date: December 29, 1939
- Running time: 91 minutes
- Country: United States
- Language: English

The Great Victor Herbert is a 1939 American musical film directed by Andrew L. Stone. During production, the movie was slated to be called The Gay Days of Victor Herbert.

This 78 RPM record released by EMI in Australia, included the movie's original title.

== Plot ==
Biography of the Irish composer for American theater, Victor Herbert (1859–1924), the first major figure in popular music since Stephen Foster, in addition to his successful Broadway plays. He is said to have written "some of the finest American songs ever heard on the stage."

== Cast ==
- Allan Jones as John Ramsey
- Mary Martin as Louise Hall
- Walter Connolly as Victor Herbert
- Lee Bowman as Dr. Richard Moore
- Susanna Foster as Peggy
- Judith Barrett as Marie Clark
- Jerome Cowan as Barney Harris
- John Garrick as Warner Bryant
- Pierre Watkin as Albert Martin
- Richard Tucker as Michael Brown
- Hal K. Dawson as George Faller
- Emmett Vogan as Forbes
- Mary Currier as Mrs. Victor Herbert
- James Finlayson as Lamplighter

== Awards ==
The film was nominated for two Academy Awards:

- Music (Scoring) – Phil Boutelje, Arthur Lange
- Sound Recording – Loren L. Ryder

It was also on a preliminary list of submissions from the studios for Cinematography (Black-and-White) but was not nominated.
