= Meet Nero Wolfe =

1936 film by Herbert Biberman

- Directed by: Herbert Biberman
- Written by: Howard J. Green; Bruce Manning; Joseph Anthony; Rex Stout (story)
- Produced by: B.P. Schulberg
- Starring: Edward Arnold; Lionel Stander; Nana Bryant; Joan Perry; Victor Jory; Rita Hayworth
- Cinematography: Henry Freulich
- Edited by: Otto Meyer
- Music by: Howard Jackson
- Production company: Columbia Pictures
- Distributed by: Columbia Pictures
- Release date: July 16, 1936
- Running time: 73 minutes
- Country: United States
- Language: English

Meet Nero Wolfe is a 1936 American mystery film based on the 1934 novel Fer-de-Lance, written by Rex Stout. Set in New York, the story introduced the detective genius Nero Wolfe (Edward Arnold) and his assistant Archie Goodwin (Lionel Stander). The partnership endured through 33 novels and 39 short stories written by Stout, but continued in only one more film for Columbia Pictures. Wolfe's client is portrayed by Rita Hayworth, then billed as Rita Cansino, in an early performance.

The titles of the film begin with the November 1934 issue of The American Magazine — in which the abridged version of Fer-de-Lance appeared — lying on a table. The magazine is taken from the table and opened to an illustrated spread that reads, "Edward Arnold in Meet Nero Wolfe."

== Plot ==
Wolfe: When I swing down to hit the ball so, the end of this homemade gun is pointing just above my waistline.
Archie: Waistline?
Wolfe: It's an imaginary line like the equator.

— Meet Nero Wolfe (1936)

At the West Hills Golf Club in Westchester, E.J. Kimball and his son Manuel are welcomed into the party of elderly Professor Barstow and his prospective son-in-law Claude Roberts. Barstow sends his caddy back to the clubhouse to fetch his visor, and finds himself without his clubs when it is his turn to tee off. The elder Kimball loans his driver to Barstow. Immediately after hitting his drive, Barstow flinches. "A mosquito bit me just as I hit the ball," he complains with good humor. "Too bad," Kimball replies sympathetically, taking the club from Barstow and making his own drive. As the foursome sets out on the course, Barstow is stricken and succumbs quickly to an apparent heart attack.

At the New York brownstone of Nero Wolfe, Marie Maringola offers the sedentary detective genius $50 to find her brother. Although he is an expert metal worker, Carlo Maringola had such trouble finding work in America that he planned to return to the old country. On the eve of his departure Carlo told his sister that he could stay in America after all — he got a job. They had arranged a celebration but Carlo never came. He disappeared.

Wolfe takes Maria's case and sends his confidential assistant Archie Goodwin to investigate at Carlo's apartment house. Archie returns to the brownstone with evidence that suggests that Carlo will never be found alive — and that his death is linked to the death of Professor Barstow. Wolfe theorizes that Barstow was killed by a specially constructed golf club, one that was converted by Carlo into an air rifle that propelled a poisoned needle into his midsection when he struck the ball. His theory is borne out by an autopsy of Barstow, and the discovery of Carlo's body.

Solving the murder of Professor Barstow will be a far more lucrative endeavor, Wolfe is pleased to learn: a $50,000 reward has been offered. But interviews with Barstow's daughter, his widow and his doctor, do little to advance the investigation.

Far more helpful is a luncheon for the four boys who caddied for Professor Barstow's foursome. Hearing their accounts, Wolfe concludes that the intended murder victim had been E.J. Kimball, not Barstow.

Kimball dismisses the notion that his life is in danger until he is informed that his car has been wrecked and his chauffeur is dead — killed by a fer-de-lance, a South American snake that is probably the most poisonous in the world. The autopsies of Professor Barstow and Carlo Maringola reveal that they too were poisoned, by the venom of the fer-de-lance. Convinced that his life is in deadly peril, Kimball pleads for Wolfe's help.

After E.J. Kimball tells him about his sensational past in South America, Wolfe concludes that at least six people had reason to wish him dead — and that the Barstow family is not above suspicion. Wolfe assigns Archie to move in with Kimball and his son, to watch over the old man. After a long game of Monopoly on the Kimballs' terrace that evening, the three men rise to go in to dinner — and shots are fired.

The attack causes Wolfe to summon all of the principals to the brownstone. They are to spend the night, and they will stay as long as necessary. The next evening a deadly parcel arrives, addressed to Wolfe. The killer has Wolfe in his sights — and Wolfe knows he has the killer under his roof.

== Cast ==
- Edward Arnold as Nero Wolfe, private detective
- Lionel Stander as Archie Goodwin, Wolfe's confidential assistant
- Dennie Moore as Mazie Gray, Archie's fiancée
- Victor Jory as Claude Roberts, Ellen Barstow's fiancé
- Nana Bryant as Sarah Barstow, widow of Professor Barstow
- Joan Perry as Ellen Barstow, daughter of Professor Barstow
- Russell Hardie as Manuel Kimball, son of E.J. Kimball
- Walter Kingsford as E.J. Kimball, international merchant
- Boyd Irwin Sr. as Professor Barstow, college president who dies on the golf course
- John Qualen as Olaf, Wolfe's Scandinavian chef
- Rita Hayworth (credited as "Rita Cansino") as Maria Maringola, client
- Juan Torena as Carlo Maringola, metal worker; brother of Maria Maringola
- Frank Conroy as Nathaniel Bradford, Professor Barstow's doctor
- William Benedict as Johnny - Barstow's Caddy

== Production ==
"When Columbia pictures bought the screen rights to Fer-de-Lance for $7,500 and secured the option to buy further stories in the series, it was thought the role would go to Walter Connolly. Instead Edward Arnold got it," reported John McAleer in Rex Stout: A Biography (1977). "Columbia's idea was to keep Arnold busy with low-cost Wolfe films between features. Two films presently were made by Columbia, Meet Nero Wolfe (Fer-de-Lance) and The League of Frightened Men. Connolly did portray Wolfe in the latter film, after Arnold decided he did not want to become identified in the public mind with one part. Lionel Stander portrayed Archie Goodwin. Stander was a capable actor but, as Archie, Rex thought he had been miscast."

Meet Nero Wolfe was the second film directed by Herbert Biberman (1900–1971), a director rooted in the theater who became best known as one of the Hollywood Ten.

"Fresh from the theater, Biberman blocked shots instead of composing them," wrote Bernard F. Dick in Radical Innocence: A Critical Study of the Hollywood Ten (1989):

Biberman opened up the action a bit, but the plot, based on Stout's Fer-de-Lance (1934), defeated him. He simply did not understand the medium; the cast reacts as it would on stage, but in film a stage reaction is overacting. Apart from some filmic touches — swish pans, dissolves, wipes, and an eerie shot of a dead man's hand clutching a newspaper clipping that another hand reaches down to retrieve — Meet Nero Wolfe is like a West End melodrama aimed at the tourist trade — slick, but so ephemeral that two days later the plot has vanished from the memory.

The film's greatest departure from the original story is the creation of Mazie Gray, who can indeed call herself Mrs. Archie Goodwin at the end of Meet Nero Wolfe. The decidedly un-Wolfean character is played by Dennie Moore, memorable for her performance as Olga the gossipy manicurist in the 1939 film, The Women.

== Reception ==
"A most comforting sort of detective for these humid days is Nero Wolfe, a sedentary sleuth given to drinking great quantities of homemade beer in his cool, shade-drawn brownstone and solving murder mysteries therefrom by means of remote control," wrote The New York Times (July 16, 1936):

Mr. Wolfe is, of course, the rotund Edward Arnold, whose characterization of Rex Stout's fairly recent fictional figure presages brisk competition for such current screen master minds as Philo Vance and Perry Mason, both in matters of deduction as well as esthetically. Where Mr. Vance, for example, collects old chrysoprase and what not, Nero Wolfe grows orchids. Mr. Wolfe sets a precedent, too, in achieving something that seems not to have occurred to the other ratiocinators of the cinema. He collects huge fees.

"Its hero, less dashing than Philo Vance and less whimsical than Charlie Chan, but more mercenary than either, will be a highly acceptable addition to the screen's growing corps of private operatives," wrote Time (July 27, 1936).

"The comedy and the guessing elements have been deftly mixed, the well-knit narrative precludes any drooping in interest and the cast disports itself in crack whodunit fashion," wrote Variety (July 22, 1936):

In bringing the Rex Stout figment to life Arnold has contributed lots more than girth and a capacity for beer guzzling. His Nero Wolfe jells suavely with the imagination and makes a piquant example of personality conception. For seven years this corpulent sleuth, with a craving for nothing but good food and ease, has not ventured from his home. When he isn't unraveling a crime for the cash it will bring him, he gravitates between two hobbies, bottle tilting and orchid growing.

Task of digging up evidence and following out leads for Wolfe on the outside falls to Lionel Stander. It's a typical mugg role for Stander but the performance he turns in pegs him as an important entertainment factor in the film.

In 2002 Scarlet Street magazine revisited Meet Nero Wolfe — little seen in the years after its release — and found it neither the travesty it is sometimes thought to be, nor a faithful recreation of the world of Nero Wolfe.

Is it absurd and a "betrayal" of Stout to make Wolfe's orchid room a kind of greenhouse offshoot to his office? Of course, it is, but it's also a clever device that keeps the orchid-growing obsession in the action without breaking from the fairly complicated plot. Other departures — such as transforming chef Fritz Brenner into the Swedish Olaf ... are less explicable. ...

What goes wrong — at least from a purist's standpoint — is the decision to portray Wolfe as a far too jolly character. This is odd in itself, since Arnold was rarely an actor who specialized in projecting good humor.

Judging the film as a film and dismissing questions of fidelity to the source material, Meet Nero Wolfe is an above average minor A picture, a solid mystery, and unfailingly entertaining. Certain things — such as a sequence involving Archie playing the then new game of Monopoly — have a nice time capsule quality that has nothing to do with the Wolfe books, but have a value all their own. No, at bottom, it's not Rex Stout's Nero and Archie, but it's a well-developed mystery (thanks to Stout's plot) with compensations all its own — and an interesting piece of Wolfeana.
