= Whom the Gods Destroy (1934 film) =

1934 film

- Film poster
- Directed by: Walter Lang
- Written by: Albert Payson Terhune; Sidney Buchman
- Starring: Walter Connolly
- Distributed by: Columbia Pictures
- Release date: July 12, 1934
- Running time: 75 minutes
- Country: United States
- Language: English

Whom the Gods Destroy is a 1934 American drama film directed by Walter Lang and starring Walter Connolly.

== Cast ==
- Walter Connolly as John Forrester a.k.a. Eric Jann a.k.a. Peter Korotoff
- Robert Young as Jack Forrester
- Doris Kenyon as Margaret Forrester
- Macon Jones as Jack Forrester (aged 14)
- Scotty Beckett as Jack Forrester (age 4; credited as Scott Beckett)
- Rollo Lloyd as Henry Braverman
- Maidel Turner as Henrietta Crosland
- Henry Kolker as Carlo - the Puppeteer
- George Humbert as Niccoli
- Hugh Huntley as Jamison - Ship's Officer
- Hobart Bosworth as Alec Klein
- Gilbert Emery as Professor Weaver
- Akim Tamiroff as Peter Korotoff
