= Let's Get Married (1937 film) =

1937 film by Alfred E. Green

- Directed by: Alfred E. Green
- Written by: Ethel Hill; Albert Z. Carr; Manuel Seff; Lynn Starling
- Produced by: Everett Riskin
- Starring: Ida Lupino; Walter Connolly; Ralph Bellamy
- Cinematography: Henry Freulich
- Edited by: Al Clark
- Music by: Morris Stoloff
- Production company: Columbia Pictures
- Distributed by: Columbia Pictures
- Release date: April 14, 1937
- Running time: 68 minutes
- Country: United States
- Language: English

Let's Get Married is a 1937 American comedy film directed by Alfred E. Green and starring Ida Lupino, who plays the daughter of a political consultant, Joe Quinn (Walter Connolly). It was produced and distributed by Columbia Pictures. Lupino was loaned out from Paramount to make the film.

== Cast ==
- Ida Lupino as Paula Quinn
- Walter Connolly as Joe Quinn
- Ralph Bellamy as Kirk Duncan
- Raymond Walburn as B. B. Harrington
- Robert Allen as Charles
- Nana Bryant as Mrs. Willoughby
- Reginald Denny as George Willoughby
- Edward McWade as Tom
- Emmett Vogan as Dick
- Will Morgan as Harry
- Granville Bates as Hank Keith

== Bibliography ==
- Bubbeo, Daniel. The Women of Warner Brothers: The Lives and Careers of 15 Leading Ladies, with Filmographies for Each. McFarland, 2001.
- Donati, William. Ida Lupino: A Biography. University Press of Kentucky, 2013.
