= The League of Frightened Men (film) =

1937 film by Alfred E. Green

- Theatrical release poster
- Directed by: Alfred E. Green
- Written by: Guy Endore; Eugene Solow
- Based on: The League of Frightened Men by Rex Stout
- Produced by: Edward Chodorov
- Starring: Walter Connolly; Lionel Stander
- Cinematography: Henry Freulich
- Edited by: Gene Milford
- Production company: Columbia Pictures
- Distributed by: Columbia Pictures
- Release date: May 25, 1937
- Running time: 71 minutes
- Country: United States
- Language: English

The League of Frightened Men is a 1937 American mystery film based on the 1935 novel of the same name, the second Nero Wolfe novel by Rex Stout. Directed by Alfred E. Green, the Columbia Pictures film stars Walter Connolly as Nero Wolfe, a role played by Edward Arnold in the previous year's Meet Nero Wolfe. The role of Wolfe's assistant Archie Goodwin was reprised by Lionel Stander.

== Plot ==
Professor Hibbard (Leonard Mudie) requests detective Nero Wolfe's assistance in tracking down the sender of a few sinister letters, which killed two of Hibbard's acquaintances. Prominent author Paul Chapin (Eduardo Ciannelli), who is a cripple, is pinpointed by Wolfe as the culprit. Wolfe rationally deduces that Chapin is out for payback — decades ago, a prank then-Harvard University scholar Hibbard and a group of chums played on Chapin went awry, causing him to be in his current state. Hibbard shares with Wolfe that his daughter (Irene Hervey) is romantically involved with Chapin's elder brother, Mark (Joseph Allen). With that, he quietly makes a move.

Wolfe arranges for all of Hibbard's surviving Harvard pals to gather at his residence. All agree to, except for taxi driver Pitney Scott (Victor Kilian). Wolfe later learns that the two friends of Hibbard's were experiencing financial difficulties. Meanwhile, Wolfe's partner Archie Goodwin (Lionel Stander) is sent to guard Chapin's house. Chapin is also invited to join the meeting at Wolfe's house. Just as he arrives, Dr. Burton (Kenneth Hunter) is shot by a hidden assailant. Wolfe, seeing the direction the shot came from, vouches for Chapin's innocence. Some time later, both Goodwin and Wolfe are captured by Mark, who despises them for initially accusing Chapin of the wrongdoing.

They manage to break free and Inspector Cramer (Edward McNamara) promptly arrests Mark for kidnapping. Wolfe suddenly cracks the case, after much thought into it. He concludes that Chapin had indeed sent those letters, but they were just meant to frighten the recipients. Instead, the actual murderer of the men is found to be one of Hibbard's friends, banker Ferdinand Bowen (Walter Kingsford). Bowen was the one who told Wolfe about the two men being in debt. In actuality, Bowen had stolen their money and made up the tale himself, as a spot-check on the men's backgrounds showed.

== Cast ==
- Walter Connolly as Nero Wolfe
- Lionel Stander as Archie Goodwin
- Eduardo Ciannelli as Paul Chapin
- Irene Hervey as Evelyn Hibbard
- Victor Kilian as Pitney Scott
- Nana Bryant as Agnes Burton
- Joseph Allen (Allen Brook) as Mark Chapin
- Walter Kingsford as Ferdinand Bowen
- Leonard Mudie as Professor Hibbard
- Kenneth Hunter as Dr. Burton
- Charles Irwin as Augustus Farrell
- Rafaela Ottiano as Dora Chapin
- Edward McNamara as Inspector Cramer
- Jameson Thomas as Michael Ayers
- Ian Wolfe as Nicholas Cabot
- Jonathan Hale as Alexander Drummond
- Herbert Ashley as Fritz
- James Flavin as Joe

== Production ==
The novel The League of Frightened Men by Rex Stout was adapted into the film by script writers Eugene Solow and Guy Endore. The film was directed by Alfred E. Green. Edward Chodorov was in charge of production for Columbia Pictures. William Whitley signed on as cinematographer, while Gene Milford edited the film.

Walter Connolly was eventually chosen to play the protagonist detective Nero Wolfe. Stout had personally wanted Charles Laughton to take up the role, but Laughton had other commitments at that time. Lionel Stander returned as Wolfe's right-hand man, Archie Goodwin; Stander previously portrayed the character in Meet Nero Wolfe (1936).

== Reception ==
Rex Stout, the author of the original novel, was reportedly unsatisfied with the film, particularly criticising Stander's portrayal of Archie Goodwin. Thus, he objected to any more adaptations of his works. Film critics generally found Connolly's depiction of Nero Wolfe to be bad.

A reviewer for The New York Times commented that the film was "a well-knit mystery, and well played out". The Sydney Morning Herald's review of the film found that "[t]here is a grim problem facing the desperate member[s] of The League of Frightened Men, but somehow this Columbia story, which brings that amiable detective, Nero Wolfe, to the screen again, fails to be convincing".

In his book The Detective in Hollywood, Jon Tuska wrote, "Unhappily, Lionel Stander's Archie in The League of Frightened Men is far too much of a bungler. The plot follows the novel, which ran initially in The Saturday Evening Post. A group of ten men is threatened by one of their number, and murders begin. Eduardo Ciannelli is the logical suspect, since he was crippled in a hazing while the men were all in college. [...] The film was in no way the equal of its predecessor."

== Bibliography ==
- Mitzi M. Brunsdale (July 2010). Icons of Mystery and Crime Detection: From Sleuths to Superheroes. ABC-CLIO. ISBN 978-0-313-34530-2.
- Michael R. Pitts (2010). Columbia Pictures Horror, Science Fiction and Fantasy Films, 1928—1982. McFarland. ISBN 978-0-7864-5766-3.
- Jon Tuska (1978). The Detective in Hollywood. Doubleday and Company. ISBN 0-385-12093-1.
- Guy M. Townsend (August 2010). The Mystery Fancier (Vol. 2 No. 1) January 1978. Wildside Press LLC. ISBN 978-1-4344-0382-7.
- O. E. McBride (May 1, 2003). Stout Fellow: A Guide Through Nero Wolfe's World. iUniverse. ISBN 978-0-595-27861-9.
