= Virginia Faulkner =

American writer and editor

Virginia Louise Faulkner
- Born: 1 March 1913; Lincoln, Nebraska
- Died: 15 September 1980 (aged 67); Lincoln, Nebraska
- Occupation: Writer
- Spouse: Everett Weil (annulled)
- Parent(s): Edwin Jerome Faulkner, Leah Louise Meyer

Virginia Louise Faulkner (1 March 1913 – 15 September 1980) was an American writer and editor.

== Personal life ==
Virginia Faulkner was born in Lincoln, Nebraska in 1913. Her father Edwin J. Faulkner (1884–1931) was general counsel of the Woodman Accident Company, which her grandfather Albert O. Faulkner (1859–1927) had founded as the Modern Woodmen Accident Association in 1890. Her brother Edwin J. Faulkner Jr. would later serve as president of the Woodmen Accident & Life Company from 1938 to 1977.

She graduated from Lincoln High School in 1928 and attended University of Nebraska-Lincoln for two years. She then attended Miss Moxley's School for American Girls in Rome. She spent a year at Radcliffe College, where she became friends with Florence Meyer, daughter of Eugene Meyer.

Eugene Meyer offered her a job as a reporter at The Washington Post, which he had just bought at auction, and she began work there in November 1933. Although she remained with the Post for just six months, she helped modernize the newspaper's Sunday magazine section with clever The New Yorker-style articles, including a series titled "Our Own Washington Letter."

While working at the Post, Faulkner finished her first novel, Friends and Romans, which was published by Simon & Schuster in July 1934. The New York Times's reviewer found "Miss Faulkner's little opus is not only romantic, in an agreeably light and somewhat irreverent manner, but it is also decidedly and refreshingly 'comico.'" Variety, on the other hand, judged that "Some of the lines are funny, but mostly it's such a race for witticism that the reader is the first to be tired." She left the Post in April 1934 to begin work on her second novel, The Barbarians, which Simon & Schuster published in March 1935. She moved to New York City soon after and began publishing comic articles and short stories for Town & Country and Cosmopolitan.

The same week that The Barbarians was published, Faulkner married Everett Weil, a cotton broker and casual acquaintance, after a long night of drinking. When she awoke the next morning, she fled Weil's apartment and immediately applied to annul what newspapers described as their "highball elopement." The marriage was annulled in August 1935, but the publicity didn't hurt the sales of The Barbarians. The novel, about the escapades of a group of artists and musicians living on the Left Bank in Paris in the 1920s, was something of a prequel to Friends and Romans and featured a number of the same characters. The New Yorker called it "quite as absurd and no less witty" than Friends and Romans and The New York Times said Faulkner was "a veritable genius for dialogue that snaps and sparkles."

In September 1935, she signed a contract with Metro-Goldwyn-Mayer studios and moved to Hollywood. There she was teamed with Gottfried Reinhardt and contributed dialogue for a number of films, including Conquest and Bridal Suite. Unhappy with work in Hollywood, however, she left in February 1938, sailing for England in the company of John Davenport and his wife.

After her return from Europe, she moved back to New York City and resumed writing for magazines and continuing a series of comic articles for Town & Country about the adventures of a ne'er-do-well gatecrasher named Princess Tulip Murphy. A dozen of these pieces were collected in My Hey-Day, subtitled The Crack-up of the International Set and published by Duell, Sloan and Pearce in June 1940. Reviewing the book in The New Yorker, Clifton Fadiman wrote that "Miss Faulkner is Saki on a boisterous bender, Dorothy Parker gone informal to the point of madness.... Sometimes funny, sometimes just gaga, she is wicked, wicked, wicked as she can be."

Later that year, she contributed skits for a short-lived Broadway revue titled All in Fun starring Bill "Bojangles" Robinson. Early in 1941, she met the composer and songwriter Dana Suesse and the two women began a relationship that lasted until Suesse moved to France to study with Nadia Boulanger in late 1947. Faulkner had become a frequent contributor to The Saturday Evening Post and other popular magazines by then, but she and Suesse longed to collaborate on a Broadway musical. Based on their combined reputations, RKO Pictures bought the movie rights to their play for $50,000, but when the stage production debuted on Broadway in February 1947, it closed after a week. George Jean Nathan wrote of the show, "That I remained in my seat for two of the three acts is still another indication that I am probably losing my mind, or at least what after so many such experiences is left of it."

After the show closed, Suesse and Faulkner travelled to Haiti to attempt, without success, to write another play. Suesse decided to move to France to study composition with Boulanger and Faulkner began to struggle with alcoholism and depression, seeking treatment at several clinics. Having become friends with the former bordello owner Polly Adler, she agreed to ghostwrite Adler's autobiography. The book, A House is Not a Home, was published in 1953 and became a national bestseller.

In 1955, Faulkner moved back to Lincoln at the encouragement of her brother Edwin. She joined the University of Nebraska Press as an associate editor and contracted to edit Roundup: A Nebraska Reader, which the Press published in 1957. In 1958, she joined the staff of Prairie Schooner, the University of Nebraska-Lincoln's literary magazine, working alongside her colleague and companion, the poet and English professor Dr. Bernice Slote.

Faulkner and Slote became involved in the establishment of Willa Cather Pioneer Memorial and were instrumental in the revival of Cather's literary reputation. They edited a series of volumes of Cather's uncollected writings that was published by the UNP in the 1960s. Ironically, the two women also used their positions to discourage attempts by scholars to emphasize feminist interpretations of Cather's work.

Although Faulkner confessed "It's a holy mystery to me how music is composed," she collaborated with composer Robert Beadell on a musical, Out to the Wind, based on Cather's short story "Eric Hermannson's Soul." It was performed at the Kimball Recital Hall in Lincoln in February 1979.

Faulkner stepped down as editor-in-chief at the UNP in August 1980 and died a month later.

== Works ==
- Friends and Romans, Simon & Schuster (1934)
- The Barbarians, Simon & Schuster (1935)
- My Hey-Day, Duell, Sloan & Pearce (1940)
- (as editor and compiler) Roundup: A Nebraska Reader, University of Nebraska Press (1957)

== Legacy ==
The Virginia Faulkner Award for Excellence in Writing was established in her name and is now awarded annually by Prairie Schooner. A collection of Faulkner's papers is held at the library of the University of Nebraska–Lincoln.

A biography, Virginia Faulkner A Life in Two Acts by Brad Bigelow, was published in 2026.
