= Rico Tomaso =

American painter

Rico Tomaso (21 February 1898 in Chicago, Illinois – August 1985 in New York, New York) was an illustrator and painter. His works were featured in magazines, novels, and sold as paintings and lithograph prints.

In his youth, Tomaso played the piano for a dance orchestra in which he met drummer Dean Cornwell, who also became a famous illustrator and an influence on Tomaso's own style. Illustration historian Walt Reed wrote that Tomaso's "work mostly resembled Cornwell's in concept and broad brush style."

John T. McCutcheon, a family friend and cartoonist for the Chicago Tribune, encouraged Tomaso's artistic talent. Tomaso studied at the Art Institute of Chicago with Wellington J. Reynolds. He also studied at the Art Students League of New York with teachers including Dean Cornwell, Robert Henri and Harvey Dunn.

== Works ==
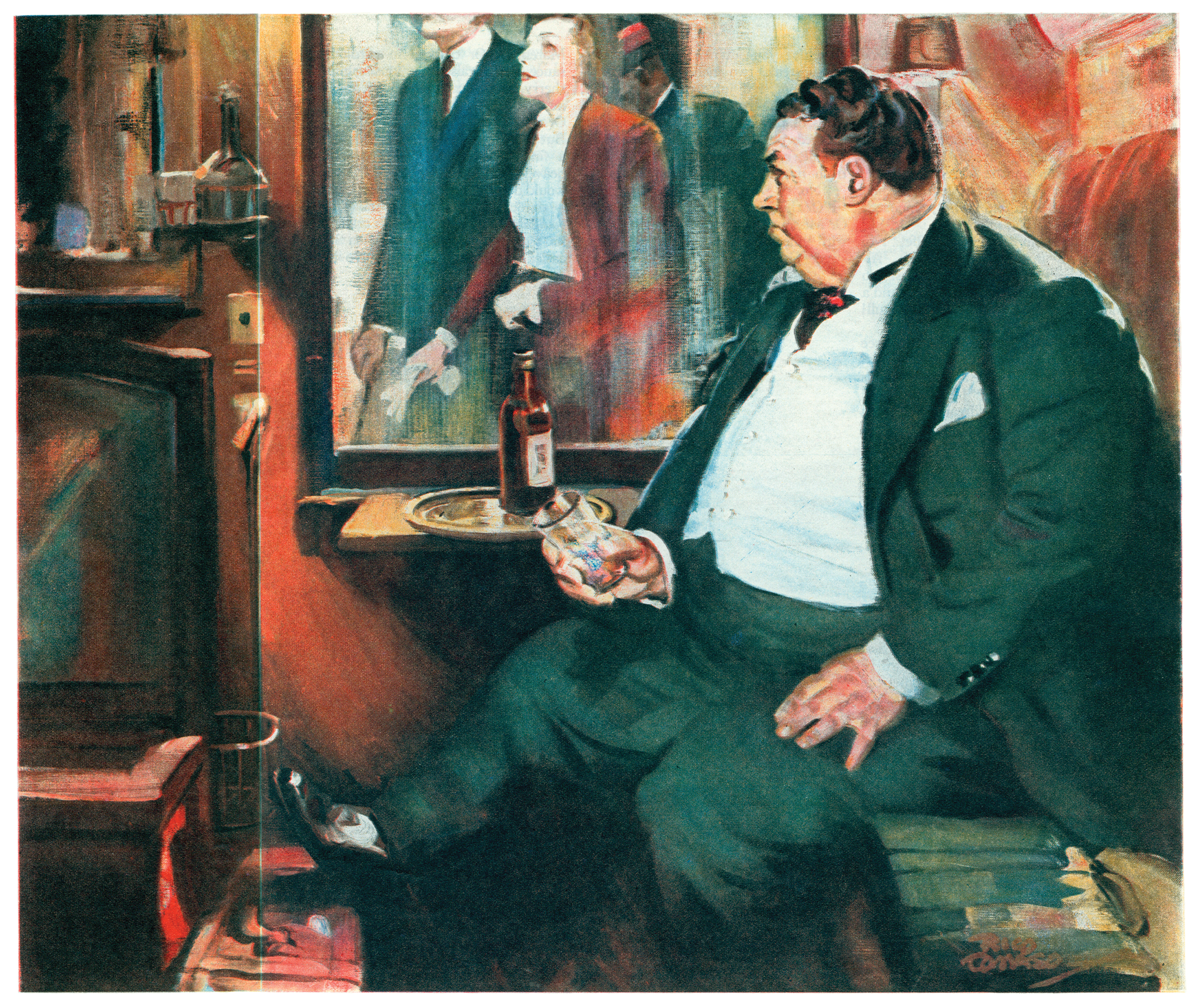
Rico Tomaso illustration of Nero Wolfe for The American Magazine serialization of Too Many Cooks (1938)

As an illustrator in New York, Tomaso worked for clients such as Granger Pipe Tobacco and Lambert Pharmacal. He frequently contributed to such periodicals as the Ladies' Home Journal and The Saturday Evening Post. He was at his best illustrating tales of high adventure, including the Albert Richard Wetjen stories about the Mounted Police of South Australia, or mysteries, such as Rex Stout's Nero Wolfe stories. As a fine artist he was represented by the Grand Central Art Galleries and by Jean Bohne, Inc., in New York.

Tomaso taught at the Grand Central School of Art, taking the classes of Harvey Dunn when the class was moved to Mamaroneck, New York.
