= Walter Connolly =

American actor (1887–1940)

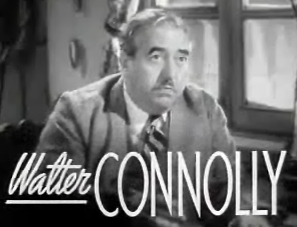
- as Doctor Grauer in Bridal Suite (1939)
- Born: Walter James Connelly Jr. April 8, 1887; Cincinnati, Ohio, U.S.
- Died: May 28, 1940 (aged 53); Beverly Hills, Los Angeles, California, U.S.
- Occupations: Film, stage and radio actor
- Years active: 1914–1939
- Spouse: Nedda Harrigan (m. 1921)
- Children: 1

Walter James Connolly Jr. (April 8, 1887 – May 28, 1940) was an American character actor who appeared in almost 50 films from 1914 to 1939. His best known film is It Happened One Night (1934).

== Early years ==
Connolly was born on April 8, 1887 in Cincinnati, Ohio, to Ella Burke Connolly and Walter James Connolly. He attended St. Xavier College and the College of Music of Cincinnati and acted locally in amateur theatrical productions.

Several years later, following his service with the U. S. Marines in World War I, rather than return directly to the United States, Connolly went to Ireland, where he enrolled in a number of non-theatre-related courses at the University of Dublin, reportedly with the intention of abandoning acting altogether. However, numerous visits to the Abbey Theater evidently rekindled Connolly's acting bug. Within four months of his return to the States, Connolly was being praised for his work alongside Margaret Anglin and others in Paul Kester's adaptation of Henry Kistemaeckers' play, The Woman of Bronze.

== Career ==
Between the years of 1916 and 1935, Connolly was a successful stage actor who appeared in twenty-two Broadway productions, notably revivals of Pirandello's Six Characters in Search of an Author and Chekhov's Uncle Vanya. His first film appearances came in two silent films, The Marked Woman (1914) and A Soldier's Oath (1915), and his first talkie film came in 1930, Many Happy Returns, but his Hollywood film career really began the Talkie era, when he appeared in four films in 1932. His trademark role was that of the exasperated business tycoon or newspaperman in screwball comedies, often as the father of the female lead character, as in It Happened One Night (1934) with Clark Gable and Claudette Colbert; Broadway Bill (1934), supporting Warner Baxter and Myrna Loy; and Libeled Lady (1936) with William Powell and Loy again. Other notable roles included the worthless uncle of Paul Muni's character in The Good Earth (1937) and one of the two con men encountered by Mickey Rooney's Huckleberry Finn in The Adventures of Huckleberry Finn (1939). Connolly played General Yen's American advisor in The Bitter Tea of General Yen (1933).

Connolly mostly played supporting roles, but starred occasionally, as Nero Wolfe in The League of Frightened Men (1937), in RKO's 5th Ave Girl (1939), opposite Ginger Rogers, and as the title character in The Great Victor Herbert (1939), his last film.

On radio, Connolly starred as the title character in The Adventures of Charlie Chan on NBC Radio from 1932 to 1938.

== Death ==
Connolly died on May 28, 1940 in Beverly Hills, following a stroke, and was buried in St. Joseph New Cemetery in Cincinnati.

== Complete filmography ==
- The Marked Woman (1914) - Prince Ching
- A Soldier's Oath (1915) - Raoul de Reyntiens
- Many Happy Returns (1930, Short)
- Washington Merry-Go-Round (1932) - Wylie
- Man Against Woman (1932) - Mossie Ennis
- No More Orchids (1932) - Bill Holt
- The Bitter Tea of General Yen (1933) - Jones
- Plainclothes Man (1932)
- Paddy the Next Best Thing (1933) - Major Adair
- Lady for a Day (1933) - Count Romero
- Man's Castle (1933) - Ira
- East of Fifth Avenue (1933) - John Lawton
- Master of Men (1933) - Sam Parker
- Eight Girls in a Boat (1934) - Storm
- It Happened One Night (1934) - Alexander Andrews
- Once to Every Woman (1934) - Dr. Selby
- Twentieth Century (1934) - Webb
- Whom the Gods Destroy (1934) - John Forrester aka Eric Jann aka Peter Korotoff
- Servants' Entrance (1934) - Viktor Nilsson
- Lady by Choice (1934) - Judge Daly
- The Captain Hates the Sea (1934) - Capt. Helquist
- Broadway Bill (1934) - J. L. Higgins
- Father Brown, Detective (1934) - Father Brown
- So Red the Rose (1935) - Malcolm Bedford
- She Couldn't Take It (1935) - Daniel Van Dyke
- One Way Ticket (1935) - Captain Bourne
- White Lies (1935) - John Frank Mitchell
- Soak the Rich (1936) - Humphrey Craig
- The Music Goes 'Round (1936) - Hector Courtney
- The King Steps Out (1936) - Maximilian, Duke of Bavaria
- Libeled Lady (1936) - Mr. James B. Allenbury
- The Good Earth (1937) - Uncle
- Nancy Steele Is Missing! (1937) - Michael Steele
- Let's Get Married (1937) - Joe Quinn
- The League of Frightened Men (1937) - Nero Wolfe
- Nothing Sacred (1937) - Oliver Stone
- First Lady (1937) - Carter Hibbard
- Penitentiary (1938) - Dist. Atty. Thomas Mathews
- Start Cheering (1938) - Sam Lewis
- Four's a Crowd (1938) - John P. Dillingwell
- Too Hot to Handle (1938) - 'Gabby' MacArthur
- The Girl Downstairs (1938) - Mr. Brown
- The Adventures of Huckleberry Finn (1939) - The 'King'
- Bridal Suite (1939) - Doctor Grauer
- Good Girls Go to Paris (1939) - Olaf Brand
- Coast Guard (1939) - Tobias Bliss
- Fifth Avenue Girl (1939) - Timothy Borden
- Those High Grey Walls (1939) - Dr. MacAuley
- The Great Victor Herbert (1939) - Victor Herbert (final film role)
