= Howard Haycraft =

American writer, editor, and publisher (1905–1991)

Howard Haycraft (July 25, 1905 – November 12, 1991) was an American writer, editor, and publisher.

Haycraft was born on July 24, 1905, in Madelia, Minnesota, to Marie (Stelzer) and Julius Everett Haycraft. He received a bachelor's degree from the University of Minnesota in 1928.

Haycraft began working at the H. W. Wilson Company in 1929 after a brief stint at the University of Minnesota Press. He was president of H. W. Wilson from 1953 to 1967 and chairman of its board of directors thereafter.

At H. W. Wilson, Haycraft edited and contributed to reference works about writers and literature. He was fascinated by mysteries and detective fiction. His book Murder for Pleasure: The Life and Times of the Detective Story (1941)—described in a profile published that year as the "first full-length history and survey of police fiction"—laid out an early critical view of the mystery genre and its theory. Murder for Pleasure identifies the origins of detective fiction in the work of Edgar Allan Poe, surveys the work of authors Haycraft identified as being of great quality or historical importance, and provides an overview of the critical literature on detective fiction up to its publication.

Haycraft received a special citation in 1976 at the centennial of the American Library Association.

A resident of Hightstown, New Jersey, Haycraft died there on November 12, 1991.
