= A Catalogue of Crime =

Crime fiction guide by Barzun and Taylor

- First edition (1971)
- Author: Jacques Barzun; Wendell Hertig Taylor
- Cover artist: Cloud Studio
- Language: English
- Subject: Crime fiction criticism
- Genre: Non-fiction
- Publisher: Harper & Row
- Publication date: 1971
- Publication place: United States
- Media type: Print (Hardcover)
- Pages: 831 pages
- ISBN: 0060102632
- OCLC: 164806

A Catalogue of Crime is a critique of crime fiction by Jacques Barzun and Wendell Hertig Taylor, first published in 1971. The book was awarded a Special Edgar Award from the Mystery Writers of America in 1972. A revised and enlarged edition was published in 1989. Barzun and Taylor both graduated in the class of 1924 from Harrisburg Technical High School.

== Purpose ==
This book is for readers of crime fiction. By offering fact and opinion about authors and their works, from Voltaire's Zadig to the latest tale published at the time of our going to press (1988), it enables the connoisseur and the neophyte to find, with greater confidence than luck provides, stories good to read or good to avoid.

— Jacques Barzun in the preface to the second edition of A Catalogue of Crime

In the preface to the 1989 second edition of A Catalogue of Crime, Jacques Barzun credits the contributions of Wendell Hertig Taylor, who died in November 1985. "He had finished, I am happy to say, his half of the substantive work [and] is therefore as fully co-author of this edition as of the first. Had he lived, it would have appeared much sooner."

== Layout ==
The work contains 952 pages. It is divided as follows:

- Part I Novels of Detection, Crime, Mystery, and Espionage (pages 1–566)
- Part II Short Stories, Collections, Anthologies, Magazines, Pastiches, and Plays (pages 569-698)
- Part III Studies and Histories of the Genre, Lives of Writers, and the Literature of "Edwin Drood" (pages 701-754)
- Part IV True Crime: Trials, Narratives of Cases, Criminology and Police Science, Espionage and Cryptography (pages 757-858)
- Part V The Literature of Sherlock Holmes : Studies and Annotations of the Tales, Nonfiction Parodies, and Critical Pastiches (pages 859-874)

=== Entries ===
The book contains a total of 5,045 entries sorted, in each of the sections, in alphabetical order by the author's last name; where there is more than one entry for an author, each is in alphabetical order of the name of the work. Some entries are very short (one might say curt): one such—the only one for the author named—is:

1587 GRIFFIN, FRANK, Appointment with My Lady West 1946

A good opening chapter, after which everything goes to pieces. The narrator-hero always shouts and commits acts, including murder, without rhyme or reason.

The "West 1946" refers to the publisher, John Westhouse Publishers, and to the year of publication.

However, there are fifty-one entries for the prolific Agatha Christie. Christie wrote many other mystery stories, using several different detectives but Barzun and Taylor chose to review these only.

The first entry (no. 749) for her After the Funeral, published in 1953, says in part:

Not one of Agatha's best. The scheme is obvious and worked repetitiously.

The last entry (no. 799) for her Why Didn't They Ask Evans?, published in 1935, contains three sentences, one of which is:

The merit consists largely in Agatha's maintaining suspense about the small mystery of a name.

The other forty-nine entries for Christie are quite mixed. They range in praise (or lack thereof) from:

A Poirot story, and very dull... (entry no. 768, re Hickory, Dickory, Death, published in 1956) to:

A triumph of her art...of motive-building. That is where A.C. is unrivaled. She knows how to make plausible the divergence between action and motive that maintains uncertainty until the physical clues...mesh with motive to disclose the culprit. (entry no. 769 re The Hollow, published in 1946).

Part V The Literature of Sherlock Holmes... contains 81 entries (numbers 4965 through 5045). Included are, of course, Sir Arthur Conan Doyle himself, the originator of Holmes and the author of the 60 Holmes stories (56 short stories and four novelas). Also represented are a host of writers, some well-known from their works in other fields, and others little known to the general public but recognized by Sherlockian scholars as having made notable contributions to the Holmesian literature.

Among the former are Isaac Asimov, the renowned science-fiction writer; the Roman Catholic clergyman Ronald Knox; and Christopher Morley, a long-time writer for the Saturday Review of Literature and author of some 50 literary works, among the best known of which are Kitty Foyle and Parnassus on Wheels; and, of course, Jacques Barzun himself. In the latter category are Dorothy Sayers, the British crime novelist (whose Lord Peter Wimsey stories are the best known); Howard Haycraft, a U.S. publishing executive whose The Art of the Mystery Story (published in 1946) is a recognized survey of the mystery genre; and Edgar Smith, a General Motors corporate executive who was one of the U.S. founders of the Baker Street Irregulars, the first organized group in the United States dedicated to the formation of local groups of Holmes aficionados around the country (called "scion societies") for the purpose of meeting regularly for the scholarly study of the Holmes adventures and to participate in such activities of other scion societies, in the United States and around the world.

== Reception ==
A Catalogue of Crime received a Special Edgar Award in 1972 from the Mystery Writers of America.

The book won immediate praise for its sections on studies and histories of crime fiction, true crime, the Sherlock Holmes canon and stories of the supernatural, and for assembling the most complete annotated bibliography of mystery and detective fiction then known. But upon its publication and in the years since, A Catalogue of Crime has been criticized for its errors, omissions and genteel point of view. Ross Macdonald's May 1971 review for The New York Times is headed, "A study of mystery and detective fiction—massive and limited":

We are given pages of descriptions of books by such respectable but pedestrian writers as John Rhode and Freeman Wills Crofts, while a brilliant innovator and master of construction like Eric Ambler is represented in the main descriptive text by two books. Graham Greene, perhaps the most distinguished crime novelist of this century, is represented by a single early work, "A Gun for Sale," with the thumbs-down comment, "Suspense only." Georges Simenon has just one entry. Jorge Luis Borges, probably Poe's greatest living literary descendant, is left out entirely. ... An even more striking and inexplicable omission is that of Dashiell Hammett's The Glass Key, which was Hammett's own favorite among his novels.

"While any ambitious bibliographical/critical work of this scope is bound to contain errors, A Catalogue of Crime has some true honkers," wrote Kevin Burton Smith, editor of The Thrilling Detective website. "Some of the omissions are truly jaw-dropping, and some of the critiques are almost cute in their old-fashioned, damn-the-facts way. Its age is showing, more than most. ... Nonetheless, it's an important source, albeit more entertaining at this point than informative."
