= The Doorbell Rang =

Novel by Rex Stout

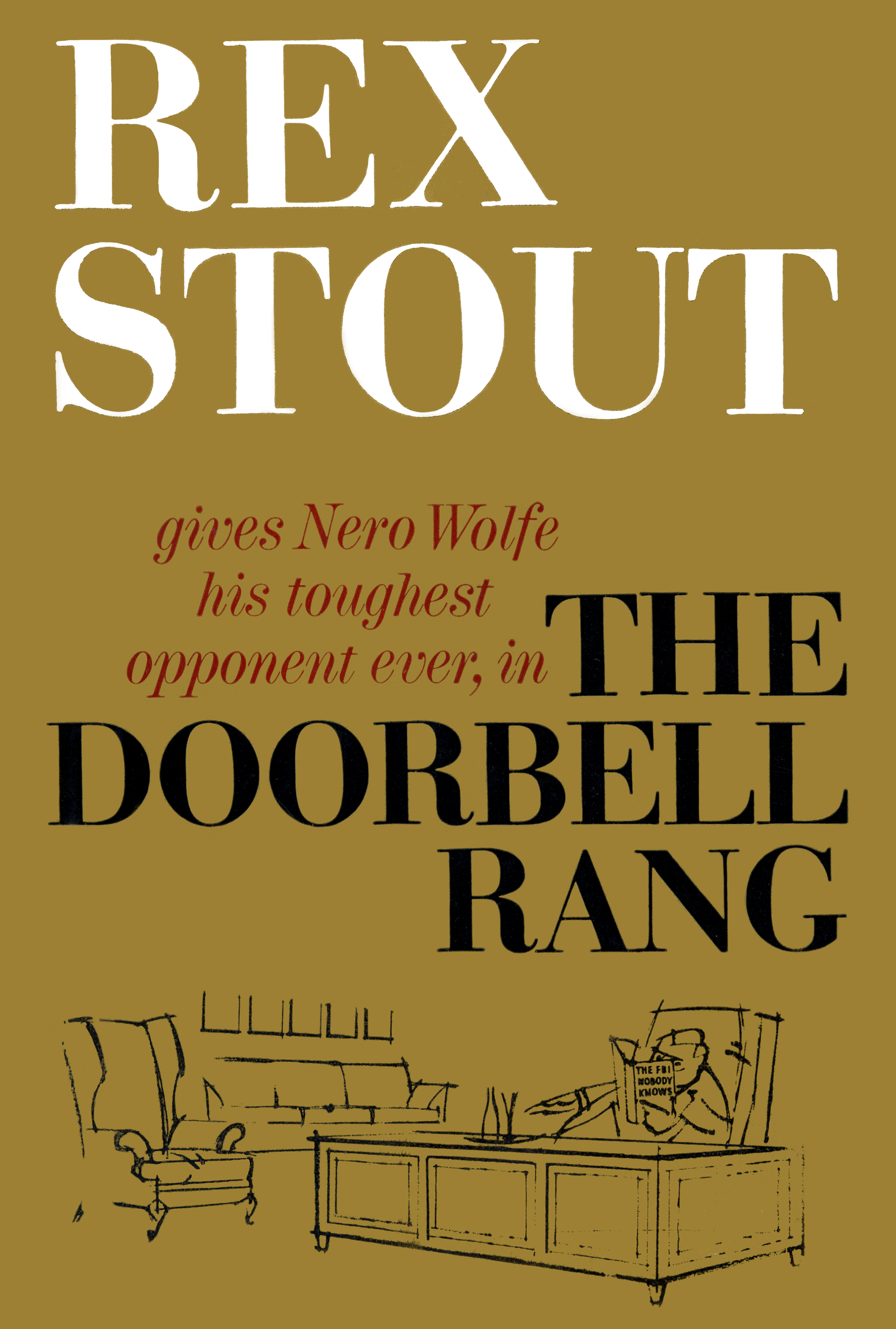
- Author: Rex Stout
- Cover artist: Bill English
- Language: English
- Series: Nero Wolfe
- Genre: Detective fiction
- Publisher: Viking Press
- Publication date: October 8, 1965
- Publication place: United States
- Media type: Print (Hardcover)
- Pages: 186 (first edition)
- OCLC: 1617370
- Preceded by: A Right to Die
- Followed by: Death of a Doxy

The Doorbell Rang is a Nero Wolfe detective novel by Rex Stout, first published by the Viking Press in 1965. Nero Wolfe is hired to force the FBI to stop wiretapping, tailing and otherwise harassing a woman who gave away 10,000 copies of a book that is critical of the Bureau and its director, J. Edgar Hoover. In addition, an author was murdered, and Archie deduces who murdered him. The novel was found to be both one of Stout’s best and controversial.

== Plot introduction ==
An hour later we were having a pleasant evening. The three guests and I were in the front room, in a tight game of pinochle, and Wolfe was in his one and only chair in the office, reading a book. The book was The FBI Nobody Knows. He was either gloating or doing research, I didn't know which.

— Archie Goodwin writing in The Doorbell Rang, chapter 12

Nero Wolfe is hired to force the FBI to stop wiretapping, tailing and otherwise harassing a woman who gave away 10,000 copies of a book that is critical of the Bureau and its director, J. Edgar Hoover.

The Doorbell Rang generated controversy when it was published, due largely to its unflattering portrayal of the FBI, its director and agents. It was published at a time when the public's attitude toward the FBI was turning critical, not long after Robert F. Kennedy and J. Edgar Hoover clashed and the Bureau was coming under fire for its investigations of Martin Luther King Jr. Some dismissed the book: National Observer described it as "little more than an anti-FBI diatribe", and Nero Wolfe fan John Wayne wrote Rex Stout a terse note of goodbye after reading the condensed magazine version. But Clifton Fadiman, quoted in a Viking Press advertisement for The Doorbell Rang, thought it was "the best of all Nero Wolfe stories".

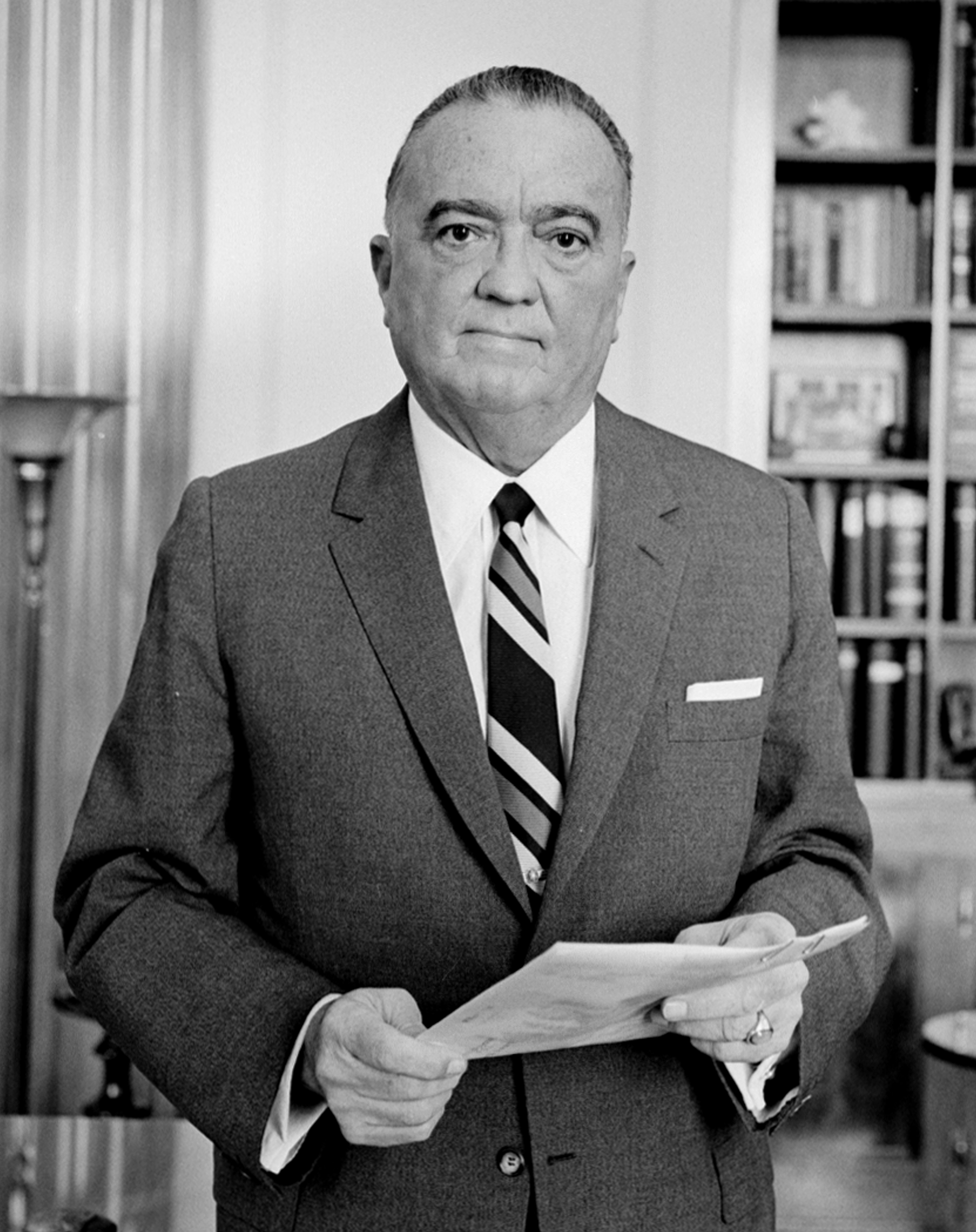
FBI Director J. Edgar Hoover in 1961

=== The FBI and The FBI Nobody Knows ===
The backdrop to The Doorbell Rang is supplied by J. Edgar Hoover's redirection of the FBI's resources away from its role in criminal investigation and toward its director's own political and ideological ends.

In 1964, American investigative journalist Fred J. Cook published The FBI Nobody Knows – collecting in book form several of his articles on FBI abuses that had previously appeared in The Nation. Although Stout considered Hoover a "megalomaniac" and "one of the most objectionable people in our country", he maintained that he had targeted Hoover's FBI almost randomly in search of a new organizational antagonist for his detective duo which would make a good story, as a break from the NYC homicide detectives and the Westchester district attorney's office. Stout's biographer states that Stout hit on the idea of the FBI while reading Cook's exposé; Stout sent Cook an autographed copy of The Doorbell Rang, thanking him for "priming my pump". Stout had not before used a Wolfe book to air his own political views so extensively, and did not do so again until 1975's A Family Affair.

== Plot summary ==
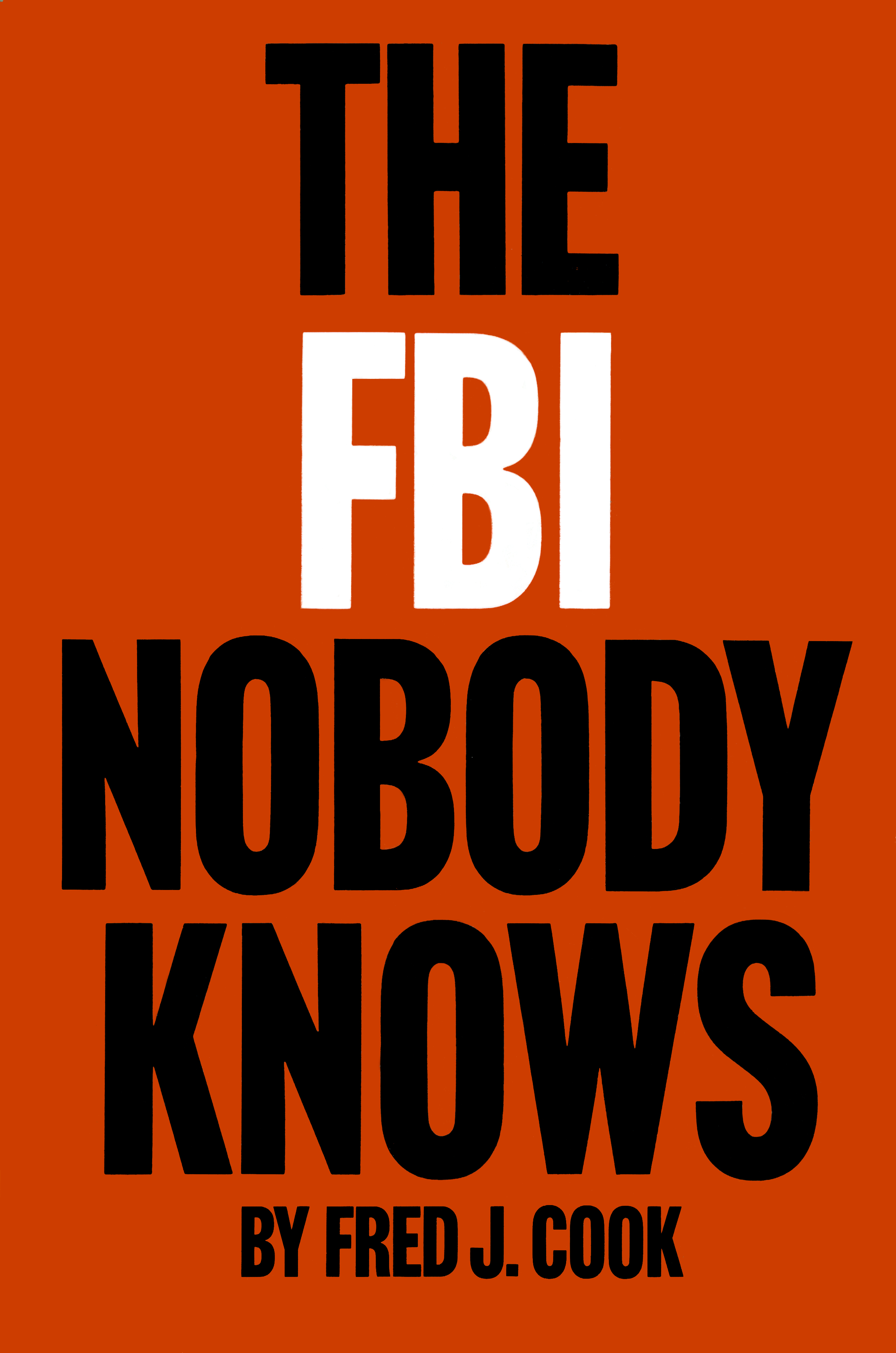
Fred J. Cook's 1964 exposé, The FBI Nobody Knows, is central to the plot of The Doorbell Rang

Rachel Bruner, a wealthy Manhattan widow, has recently incurred the wrath of the FBI. After reading a book called The FBI Nobody Knows, a prominent critique of the many unethical practices of the Bureau, she has mailed 10,000 copies of it to prominent figures across the country. Having endured several incidents of harassment and prying, she offers to hire Wolfe to persuade the FBI to leave her alone. Although initially hesitant of making a powerful enemy, Wolfe is persuaded over Archie’s objections when Bruner offers a $50,000 retainer and then doubles it to $100,000, as well as a fee and any expenses he may incur. He is also sympathetic to both Bruner’s plight and the arguments made in the book, and decides not to withdraw in the face of what he sees as heavy-handed and bullying opposition tactics.

As the FBI put Wolfe and Archie under surveillance, Wolfe plans to gain examples of FBI malfeasance and use it to persuade the FBI to back down. To defeat the FBI bugs, Wolfe & his speaker agree to occasionally say false things but raise their finger when doing so; as the bugs are sound-only, the FBI listeners will not know if a statement was true or false. Archie’s initial investigations prove fruitless, but he soon receives an anonymous message from Dr. Vollmer, Wolfe’s physician, asking for a clandestine meeting. Although initially suspecting an FBI trap, Archie is astonished to learn that the message is from Inspector Cramer. Cramer reveals that the FBI are attempting to have Wolfe and Archie’s private investigator licenses revoked. He also reveals that he suspects that FBI agents may be involved in the murder of Morris Althaus, a freelance journalist who was researching an article critical of the Bureau, two months earlier. Althaus was found shot to death in his apartment, but the fatal bullet was never recovered; in addition, his research notes were also missing. Cramer, who is opposed to the FBI’s efforts to sabotage Wolfe and stonewall the police's homicide investigation, offers to write a report favourable to Wolfe and Archie if Wolfe proves that the FBI are responsible for the murder of Althaus.

Wolfe instead decides that it would serve his purposes better to prove that the FBI had no part in the murder. He also devises a plan to trap the FBI. Acting on the suspicion that the FBI have secretly bugged Wolfe’s office, Wolfe gathers the key suspects in his office and publicly claims that he is gathering proof that FBI agents murdered Althaus and are covering it up, while directing Archie to conduct his own investigation.

Archie discovers that Sarah Dacos, Bruner’s secretary, lives in the same apartment building as Althaus and claimed to have seen FBI agents leaving the apartment on the night of the murder. When Wolfe and Archie question her, Dacos claims only a casual acquaintance with Althaus, but Archie remains suspicious of her. Acting on a hunch, he breaks into Dacos’s apartment, where he discovers proof that Dacos and Althaus were engaged in an affair. He also discovers the gun that was used to kill Althaus. Archie realises that Dacos murdered Althaus after he broke off their relationship to marry another woman, and that he needs to leave the gun behind. He moves it to a new hiding place, but worries that Dacos will dispose of it before Wolfe and Archie can prove her guilt.

Meanwhile, Wolfe has been preparing his trap for the FBI. Publicly arranging a dinner with his old friend and fellow orchid lover Lewis Hewitt, he privately hires two actors resembling himself and Archie and has them smuggled into the brownstone, along with his operatives Saul Panzer, Fred Durkin and Orrie Cather. The actors are sent to Hewitt’s dinner posing as Wolfe and Archie, while Wolfe, Archie and the operatives secretly remain in the brownstone. Having spread his public suspicions of the FBI and his plans for the house to be empty, Wolfe suspects that the FBI will use the opportunity to break in and steal any evidence he has that FBI agents murdered Althaus.

Two agents break into the house that night, only to be held at gunpoint by Archie and the operatives. Wolfe confiscates their credentials, having obtained conclusive proof of the FBI's harassment of a private citizen and conduct of illegal activities. The next day, Wolfe meets with senior FBI official Richard Wragg and offers a deal, with Bruner watching through the office peephole. Wolfe refuses to return the credentials, but offers to abstain from pressing charges and publicly embarrassing the FBI, in exchange for the FBI ceasing all surveillance and harassment of Bruner and those connected to her, including Archie and himself. He adds that he can prove that FBI agents were not responsible for Althaus' murder.

After Wragg agrees to Wolfe’s terms, Archie approaches Inspector Cramer and gives him a lead on Dacos. After the police search her apartment and find the gun, Dacos is arrested for the murder. Wolfe then gathers Wragg and Cramer in his office and negotiates a deal between them. In exchange for Wragg handing over the missing bullet that will prove Dacos' guilt, taken by the FBI along with Althaus' research notes, Cramer will conceal any involvement on the part of the FBI. Wragg and Cramer reluctantly agree to Wolfe’s deal.

The novel ends with Wolfe and Archie receiving an unidentified but important visitor, implied to be J. Edgar Hoover ("the big fish", someone Archie has never seen before, but of whom he has seen plenty of pictures). Speculating that this visitor has come in person to collect the FBI credentials, Wolfe refuses to let him into the house, leaving the visitor to keep ringing the doorbell.

== Cast of characters ==
- Nero Wolfe, private detective
- Archie Goodwin, Wolfe's assistant, narrator of all the Wolfe stories
- Rachel Bruner, Wolfe's client, a wealthy business owner who, along with her family and employees, is being harassed by the FBI
- Sarah Dacos, Mrs. Bruner's secretary
- Morris Althaus, a writer whose murder is somehow connected to the FBI's activities in Manhattan
- Ivana Althaus, Morris's mother, who quotes both Leviticus and Aristotle on the subject of vengeance
- Richard Wragg, special agent in charge of the FBI's New York office
- Ashley Jarvis and Dale Kirby, actors hired to stand in for Wolfe and Goodwin, respectively
- Inspector Cramer, head of West Manhattan Homicide

== Reviews and commentary ==
After reading the condensed magazine version of The Doorbell Rang, John Wayne wrote to Rex Stout: "Have always enjoyed your Nero and Archie, but I read your story in the April issue of Argosy. Goodbye."

- Jacques Barzun and Wendell Hertig Taylor, A Catalogue of Crime – "The plot is transparent and the detection is fairly simple, but one or two of the dodges practiced here by Wolfe are new (for him). The scene in which the New York head of the FBI is 'rated' in Wolfe's office and told he can't have a set of credentials belonging to one of his own men is rich. The anti-'bugging' scheme is also amusing."
- Harper's, Books in Brief (December 1965) – "One always feels that Mr. Stout is having fun with his Nero Wolfe and Archie, but never has it been more apparent than in this complicated but easily followed tale. It's a story of sleuthing, harassment, murder, the FBI – very especially the FBI – and the police, with the usual delicious decor of orchids, fine foods, and happily unconventional and pungent dialogue. Almost everybody's role is unexpectedly askew and you don't see how they can all possibly get their deserts, but they do, convincingly and rather hilariously."
- The Nation – "No doubt about it – the best civil liberties mystery of all time."
- Nancy Pearl, Book Lust – "When Stout is on top of his game, which is most of the time, his diabolically clever plotting and his storytelling ability exceed that of any other mystery writer you can name, including Agatha Christie, who invented her own eccentric genius detective Hercule Poirot. Although in the years since Stout's death I find myself going back and rereading his entire oeuvre every year or two, I return with particular pleasure to these five novels: The Doorbell Rang; Plot It Yourself; Murder by the Book; Champagne for One; and Gambit."
- Terry Teachout, "Forty years with Nero Wolfe" (January 12, 2009) – "Rex Stout's witty, fast-moving prose hasn't dated a day, while Wolfe himself is one of the enduringly great eccentrics of popular fiction. I've spent the past four decades reading and re-reading Stout's novels for pleasure, and they have yet to lose their savor ... It is to revel in such writing that I return time and again to Stout's books, and in particular to The League of Frightened Men, Some Buried Caesar, The Silent Speaker, Too Many Women, Murder by the Book, Before Midnight, Plot It Yourself, Too Many Clients, The Doorbell Rang, and Death of a Doxy, which are for me the best of all the full-length Wolfe novels."
- Time, "The Grand Race" (book review) (November 5, 1965) – "Stout once said all that he thinks is important to say. A good mystery writer, he wrote, merely tells the reader: "Let's run a race. Here goes my mind, I'm off, see if you can catch me." In Doorbell, even FBI fans will have to admire his agility."
- Dilys Winn, Murder Ink: The Mystery Reader's Companion – "Most Overrated Wolfe".

=== The FBI and The Doorbell Rang ===
Researching his book Dangerous Dossiers: Exposing the Secret War Against America's Greatest Authors (1988), journalist Herbert Mitgang discovered that Stout had been under FBI surveillance since the beginning of his writing career. Most of the heavily censored pages he was allowed to obtain from Stout's FBI dossier concerned The Doorbell Rang:

About one hundred pages in Stout's file are devoted to the novel, the FBI's panicky response to it and the attempt to retaliate against the author for writing it. The FBI's internal memorandum for its special agents told them that "the bureau desires to contribute in no manner to the sales of this book by helping to make it the topic of publicity." Orders came from headquarters in Washington that any questions concerning the book should be forwarded to the Crime Records Division, thereby putting book and author in a criminal category.

An internal memorandum by Special Agent M. A. Jones (name surprisingly not censored) summarized the novel and went on to write a critique for the FBI's top command – a rare "literary" honor accorded to few books in its files ... Following the review came a series of recommendations – first, Stout was designated as a person "not to be contacted" without prior approval by FBI headquarters in Washington ...

In April 1976, the Church Committee found that The Doorbell Rang is a reason Rex Stout's name was placed on the FBI's "not to contact list", which it cited as evidence of the FBI's political abuse of intelligence information.

== Adaptations ==
=== Nero Wolfe (A&E Network) ===
Executive producer Michael Jaffe adapted The Doorbell Rang for the series premiere of A Nero Wolfe Mystery (2001–2002), a Jaffe/Braunstein Films coproduction with the A&E Network. The first of four Nero Wolfe episodes directed by executive producer and star Timothy Hutton, "The Doorbell Rang" made its debut April 22, 2001, on A&E.

Timothy Hutton is Archie Goodwin; Maury Chaykin is Nero Wolfe. Other members of the cast are Debra Monk (Rachel Bruner), Francie Swift (Sarah Dacos), Colin Fox (Fritz Brenner), Saul Rubinek (Lon Cohen), Conrad Dunn (Saul Panzer), Fulvio Cecere (Fred Durkin), Trent McMullen (Orrie Cather), Bill Smitrovich (Inspector Cramer), R.D. Reid (Sergeant Purley Stebbins), James Tolkan (Richard Wragg), and Nicky Guadagni (Ivana Althaus).

"The Doorbell Rang" was filmed in Toronto, with select Manhattan exteriors. Composer Michael Small wrote the jazzy score, including the title music and series theme, "Boss Boogie". The soundtrack also includes music by Ib Glindemann, (Note: Ib Glindemann, "Little Jug". Carlin Production Music, CAR 202, Big Band - Jazz - Swing (track 14).) (Note: Ib Glindemann, "Cabaret". Carlin Production Music, CAR 202, Big Band - Jazz - Swing (track 41).) Alan Moorhouse, (Note: Alan Moorhouse, "In the Swing". KPM Music, KPM 91, Music of the 20s, 30s and 40s (track 20).) Bill Novick and Paul Lenart, (Note: Bill Novick and Paul Lenart, "Down in Harlem". Sonoton, SCD 319, The Roaring 20s – USA (track 32).) and Giuseppe Verdi. (Note: Giuseppe Verdi, "La donna è mobile" from Rigoletto, arranged by Daryl Griffith. KPM Music, KPM 405, Opera – The Works 1 (track 4).)

In North America, A Nero Wolfe Mystery was released on Region 1 DVD by A&E Home Video (ISBN 076708893X). "The Doorbell Rang" is one of the Nero Wolfe episodes released on Region 4 DVD in Australia in 2008, under license by FremantleMedia. (Note: Nero Wolfe – Collection One (UPC 9316797427038) was released August 13, 2008, by Magna Home Entertainment. The three-disc Region 4 set includes "The Golden Spiders", "The Doorbell Rang" and "Champagne for One". Each 90-minute film is presented with a single set of titles and credits. Screen format is 4:3 full frame. Rated M (mild crime themes and mild violence) by the Commonwealth of Australia.) In 2009 the film was released on Region 2 DVD in the Netherlands, by Just Entertainment. (Note: A Nero Wolfe Mystery — Serie 1 (EAN 8717344739221) was released December 11, 2009, by Just Entertainment, under license by FremantleMedia. The three-disc Region 2 set includes "The Golden Spiders", "The Doorbell Rang" and "Champagne for One". Each 90-minute film is presented with a single set of titles and credits. Screen format is 4:3 full frame; optional Dutch subtitles.) In October 2012 a region-free set of the complete series was released by independent Australian DVD distributor Shock Entertainment, which also made the series available through Australian iTunes. All of these DVD releases present "The Doorbell Rang" in 4:3 pan and scan rather than its 16:9 aspect ratio for widescreen viewing.

=== Nero Wolfe (Paramount Television) ===
In 1977, Thayer David filmed and starred in Nero Wolfe, a Paramount Television production based on the novel The Doorbell Rang. Written and directed by Frank D. Gilroy, the film costarred Tom Mason (Archie Goodwin), Brooke Adams (Sarah Dacos), Biff McGuire (Inspector Cramer), John Randolph (Lon Cohen), Anne Baxter (Mrs. Bruner), David Hurst (Fritz Brenner), John O'Leary (Theodore Horstmann) and Sarah Cunningham (Mrs. Althaus). Intended as the pilot for a TV series, the made-for-TV movie was shelved due to Thayer David's death in July 1978. Nero Wolfe was finally broadcast December 18–19, 1979, as an ABC TV late show.

A year later, Paramount produced Nero Wolfe, a weekly series that ran January 16 – August 25, 1981, on NBC TV. The second episode, "Death on the Doorstep", was an original story by Stephen Downing that also incorporated elements of the novel The Doorbell Rang. William Conrad and Lee Horsley star as Nero Wolfe and Archie Goodwin. Other members of the cast include George Voskovec (Fritz Brenner), Robert Coote (Theodore Horstmann), George Wyner (Saul Panzer) and Allan Miller (Inspector Cramer). Directed by George McCowan, "Death on the Doorstep" aired January 23, 1981.

=== Il pesce più grosso (Radiotelevisione Italiana) ===
The Doorbell Rang was adapted for a series of Nero Wolfe films produced by the Italian television network RAI (Radiotelevisione Italiana). Directed by Giuliana Berlinguer from a teleplay by Edoardo Anton, Nero Wolfe: Il pesce più grosso first aired March 11, 1969.

The series of black-and-white telemovies stars Tino Buazzelli (Nero Wolfe), Paolo Ferrari (Archie Goodwin), Pupo De Luca (Fritz Brenner), Renzo Palmer (Inspector Cramer), Roberto Pistone (Saul Panzer), Mario Righetti (Orrie Cather) and Gianfranco Varetto (Fred Durkin). Other members of the cast of Il pesce più grosso include Paola Borboni (Signora Bruner), Silvia Monelli (Signora Dacos), Enrico Luzi (Quayle), Lia Angeleri (Signorina Althaus), Bruno Smith (Jarvis), Simone Mattioli (Kirby) and Fernando Cajati (Wragg).

== Publication history ==
- 1965, New York: The Viking Press, October 8, 1965, hardcover

Bookseller and publisher Otto Penzler describes the first edition of The Doorbell Rang: "Reddish marbleized boards, black cloth spine; front and rear covers blank; spine printed with red and white. Issued in a mainly gold-colored dust wrapper." In April 2006, Firsts: The Book Collector's Magazine estimated that the first edition of The Doorbell Rang had a value of between $100 and $200. The estimate is for a copy in very good to fine condition in a like dustjacket.

- 1965, New York: Viking (Mystery Guild), December 1965, hardcover (Note: The far less valuable Viking book club edition may be distinguished from the first edition in three ways: The dust jacket has "Book Club Edition" printed on the inside front flap, and the price is absent (first editions may be price clipped if they were given as gifts).; Book club editions are sometimes thinner and always taller (usually a quarter of an inch) than first editions.; Book club editions are bound in cardboard, and first editions are bound in cloth (or have at least a cloth spine).)
- 1965, Toronto: Macmillan, 1965, hardcover
- 1966, London: Collins Crime Club, January 3, 1966, hardcover
- 1966, Argosy, April 1966 (abridged)
- 1966, New York: Bantam #F-3254, October 1966, paperback
- 1968, London: Fontana, 1968, paperback
- 1976, London: Penguin, The First Rex Stout Omnibus ISBN 0-14-004032-3 (with The Second Confession and More Deaths Than One) 1976, paperback
- 1992, New York: Bantam Crime Line ISBN 0-553-23721-7 July 1992, paperback, Rex Stout Library edition with introduction by Stuart Kaminsky
- 1997, Burlington, Ontario: Durkin Hayes Publishing, DH Audio ISBN 0-88646-443-9 August 1997, audio cassette (abridged, read by Saul Rubinek)
- 2000, Pleasantville, New York: Reader's Digest Association, Inc. (ImPress) ISBN 0-7621-8857-X, hardcover
- 2010, New York: Bantam Crimeline ISBN 978-0-307-75589-6 June 9, 2010, e-book

== See also ==
- Chaffing and winnowing: Secure communication technique described in The Doorbell Rang and popularized in a 1998 paper.
