= Gambit (novel) =

1962 novel Rex Stout

- Author: Rex Stout
- Cover artist: Bill English
- Language: English
- Series: Nero Wolfe
- Genre: Detective fiction
- Publisher: Viking Press
- Publication date: October 12, 1962
- Publication place: United States
- Media type: Print (Hardcover)
- Pages: 188 pp. (first edition)
- OCLC: 747582
- Preceded by: Homicide Trinity
- Followed by: The Mother Hunt

Gambit is a Nero Wolfe detective novel by Rex Stout, first published by the Viking Press in 1962.

== Plot introduction ==
She was staring up at me. "He's burning up a dictionary?"
"Right. That's nothing. Once he burned up a cookbook because it said to remove the hide from a ham end before putting it in the pot with lima beans. Which he loves most, food or words, is a tossup."

— Archie, explaining Wolfe's reaction to a dictionary that allows the use of "infer" in place of "imply," in Gambit, chapter 1.

A chess prodigy is poisoned during a club tournament, and the police arrest the member who served the victim hot chocolate. Wolfe is hired to exonerate the suspect, but finds that no one else has either an adequate motive or the requisite opportunity.

Gambit employs three distinctive plot elements found in other Wolfe stories. The means by which poison is administered is very similar to the means used in "Cordially Invited to Meet Death". A tape recording is made in an Italian restaurant, one which also appears in "Poison à la Carte". And the part that a gambit plays in a murder echoes "Method Three for Murder".

== Plot summary ==
Collins Crime Club released the British first edition in 1963, with a dustjacket design attributed to John Rose

Sally Blount's father, Matthew Blount, has been arrested for the murder of Paul Jerin, a chess master. Blount had arranged for Jerin to play twelve simultaneous games of blindfold chess at his club. Well into the contest, Jerin complains of physical discomfort and cannot continue. Shortly thereafter, Jerin dies of what tests show to be arsenic poisoning.

During the contest, Jerin sat by himself in a small library off the chess club's main game room. He has nothing to eat or drink except a pot of hot chocolate, brought to him by Blount. After Jerin falls ill, Doctor Victor Avery tends him. Avery is a chess player in the contest. Avery stays with Jerin until Jerin dies at the hospital. Avery is the Blount family doctor.

Not only does Blount bring the hot chocolate to Jerin, he washes out the pot and the cup after Jerin complains that he does not feel well.

The only people to enter the library where Jerin sat, other than Blount, are four messengers, who relay the moves between the main game room and the library. The messengers apparently have no motive to put arsenic in Jerin's chocolate.

Dan Kalmus represents Blount after he is in jail without bail. Blount's daughter Sally is certain that Kalmus is in love with Blount's wife Anna, and that he will not give Blount his best legal efforts. Furthermore, Kalmus' specialty is business law, not criminal law.

Certain of her father’s innocence, Sally hires a reluctant Wolfe to investigate on her father's behalf. Neither Wolfe nor Archie seems to have his heart in the case because the circumstances point so clearly at Blount. Wolfe learns that the police discovered no connection between the messengers and Jerin, whereas Blount was unhappy that Jerin had been seeing Sally.

Because he assumes that Sally is correct that her father does not have a motive for murder, Wolfe conjectures that Jerin was poisoned to frame Blount, who sits in prison. Wolfe's hypothesis is that Jerin was a pawn, sacrificed in a gambit to get rid of Blount.

Wolfe speaks with each of the messengers to determine which of them wanted Blount, not Jerin, out of the way. Each of the four has a possible motive: Sally thinks Kalmus is in love with her mother, Farrow would like to take over Blount's firm, Yerkes wants Blount's vote in a board election but will not get it, and Hausman resents Blount for going easy on him in chess games but winning anyway. Kalmus is murdered in his home, found by Archie and Sally.

Blount then tells Wolfe "a certain fact" known only to Blount and to Kalmus that will demonstrate his innocence. Blount did put something in Jerin's chocolate, but it was sedative in effect, not fatally poisonous. This information leads Wolfe and Archie, separately, to infer both the murderer's identity and how the arsenic got into Jerin. The problem is the lack of evidence to prove the case.

Wolfe has Anna Blount call her friends from the chess match to his office, where he says that he knows but cannot name the guilty man, and it is not Matt Blount. Archie calls Doctor Avery; he confronts Avery at a restaurant where their conversation is tape recorded and Avery admits his crimes. He wanted Blount out of the way. Anna is his motive and he had the opportunity. He murdered two men. Before police can arrest him, he kills himself.

== The unfamiliar word ==
In most Nero Wolfe novels and novellas, there is at least one unfamiliar word, usually spoken by Wolfe. Gambit contains these three (the page references are to the Bantam edition):

- Trimmer. Page 71, at the beginning of Chapter 8. This word, with this meaning, also appears in Champagne for One.
- Analeptic. Page 125, halfway through Chapter 12.
- Contemned. Page 154, next-to-last page of the book. This word also appears in Prisoner's Base.

== Cast of characters ==
- Nero Wolfe — The private investigator
- Archie Goodwin — Wolfe's assistant (and the narrator of all Wolfe stories)
- Matthew Blount — Wealthy businessman, in jail on a charge of murder
- Sally Blount — Daughter of Matthew Blount, and Wolfe's client
- Anna Blount — Wife of Matthew Blount
- Dan Kalmus — Matthew Blount's lawyer, messenger at chess contest
- Charles Yerkes — Banker, business acquaintance of Blount, messenger at chess contest
- Morton Farrow — Sales manager at Blount's company, Anna Blount's nephew, messenger at chess contest
- Ernst Hausman — Retired broker, Sally Blount's godfather, messenger at chess contest
- Victor Avery — The Blounts' family doctor, participant in chess contest
- Bernard Nash - Steward at the Gambit Club
- Tony Laghi - Cook at the Gambit Club

== The peripatetic Piotti ==
In Gambit, Piotti's restaurant is located on 13th Street, east of Second Avenue in Manhattan. In "Poison à la Carte", published two years earlier, the restaurant is on 14th Street, between Second and Third Avenues, thus west of Second Avenue. Stout was not known for consistency in minor plot matters.

== Chess allusions ==
There is a description, in Chapter 3, of the interior of the Gambit chess club. "In a corner was a chess table with a marble top, with yellow and brown marble for the squares, and the men spread around, not on their home squares. The Gazette had said that the men were of ivory and Kokcha lapis lazuli and they and the table had belonged to and been played with by Louis XIV, and that the men were kept in the position after the ninth move of Paul Morphy's most famous game, his defeat of the Duke of Brunswick and Count Isouard in Paris in 1858,"

In the same chapter, Archie Goodwin tried to guess the next moves of a game that he was watching. After failing every time, he "conceded that I would never be a Botvinnik...."

In Chapter 7, Morton Farrow says, "I'm all right the first three or four moves, any opening from the Ruy Lopez to the Caro–Kann, but I soon get lost. My uncle got me started at it because he thinks it develops the brain. I'm not so sure. Look at Bobby Fischer, the American champion. Has he got a brain?"

Dr. Victor Avery, in Chapter 8, claimed that he did not hear any conversations during a chess game because he "was concentrating on my reply. I was trying the Albin Counter Gambit. Houghteling had used it against Dodge in 1905 and had mated him on the sixteenth move.”

== Trivia ==
Throughout the story, one of Wolfe's diversions is the reading of Robert Ardrey's African Genesis. This book promulgated the Killer ape theory which claims that humans are naturally murderous.

One character, in business and finance, was given the name of a real hard-driving financier who played crucial roles in building transit infrastructure, including the Loop Elevated structure in Chicago and finance for the London Underground. Charles Yerkes lived from 1837 to 1905, an American who was born in Philadelphia, Pennsylvania. In the novel, the character has a relatively minor role.

== Reviews and commentary ==
- Jacques Barzun and Wendell Hertig Taylor, A Catalogue of Crime — There is more detection in this story than in any other of the mulling-and-quizzing sort; here we really see Nero Wolfe's thoughts whirring. Moreover, Archie is in excellent form, and although a chess tournament is a feature, the game itself is not. The great scene is that in which Nero reads and burns the pages of Webster's Dictionary, Third Edition.
- Nancy Pearl, Book Lust — When Stout is on top of his game, which is most of the time, his diabolically clever plotting and his storytelling ability exceed that of any other mystery writer you can name, including Agatha Christie, who invented her own eccentric genius detective Hercule Poirot. Although in the years since Stout's death I find myself going back and rereading his entire oeuvre every year or two, I return with particular pleasure to these five novels: The Doorbell Rang; Plot It Yourself; Murder by the Book; Champagne for One; and Gambit.

== Adaptations ==
=== Nero Wolfe (Radiotelevisione italiana S.p.A.) ===
==== Sfida al cioccolato (1971) ====
Gambit was adapted for a series of Nero Wolfe films produced by the Italian television network RAI. Directed by Giuliana Berlinguer from a teleplay by Vladimiro Cajoli, Nero Wolfe: Sfida al cioccolato first aired February 14, 1971.

The series of black-and-white telemovies stars Tino Buazzelli (Nero Wolfe), Paolo Ferrari (Archie Goodwin), Pupo De Luca (Fritz Brenner), Renzo Palmer (Inspector Cramer), Roberto Pistone (Saul Panzer), Mario Righetti (Orrie Cather) and Gianfranco Varetto (Fred Durkin). Other members of the cast of Sfida al cioccolato include Micaela Esdra (Sally Blount), Mario Maranzana (Matthew Blount), Silvia Monelli (Anna Blount), Paolo Carlini (Daniel Kalmus), Giampiero Albertini (Ernst Hausman), Renato Campese (Morton Farrow), Renato Turi (Charles Yerkes) and Mario Laurentino (Piotti).

==== Scacco al Re (2012) ====
Grazia Giardiello adapted Gambit for the fifth episode of the RAI TV series Nero Wolfe (Italy 2012), starring Francesco Pannofino as Nero Wolfe and Pietro Sermonti as Archie Goodwin. Set in 1959 in Rome, where Wolfe and Archie reside after leaving the United States, the series was produced by Casanova Multimedia and Rai Fiction and directed by Riccardo Donna. "Scacco al Re" aired May 3, 2012.

== Publication history ==
- 1962, New York: The Viking Press, October 12, 1962, hardcover

In his limited-edition pamphlet, Collecting Mystery Fiction #10, Rex Stout's Nero Wolfe Part II, Otto Penzler describes the first edition of Gambit: "Blue cloth, front cover and spine printed with red; rear cover blank. Issued in a red, white and black dust wrapper."
In April 2006, Firsts: The Book Collector's Magazine estimated that the first edition of Gambit had a value of between $150 and $300. The estimate is for a copy in very good to fine condition in a like dustjacket.

- 1962, Toronto: Macmillan, 1962, hardcover
- 1963, New York: Viking (Mystery Guild), January 1963, hardcover

The far less valuable Viking book club edition may be distinguished from the first edition in three ways:

- The dust jacket has "Book Club Edition" printed on the inside front flap, and the price is absent (first editions may be price clipped if they were given as gifts).
- Book club editions are sometimes thinner and always taller (usually a quarter of an inch) than first editions.
- Book club editions are bound in cardboard, and first editions are bound in cloth (or have at least a cloth spine).

- 1963, London: Collins Crime Club, April 29, 1963, hardcover
- 1964, New York: Bantam #F2731, February 1964, paperback, .50¢
- 1965, London: Panther, August 1965, paperback
- 1971, London: Fontana, 1971, paperback
- 1973, New York: Bantam #N7697, August 1973,2nd Ed. 1st print, paperback, .95¢
- 1985, New York: Bantam Books ISBN 0-553-14646-7 September 1985, paperback
- 2005, Auburn, California: The Audio Partners Publishing Corp., Mystery Masters ISBN 1-57270-441-1 January 2005, audio CD (unabridged, read by Michael Prichard)
- 2011, New York: Bantam ISBN 978-0-307-76805-6 August 17, 2011, e-book
