= Murder by the Book =

1951 Nero Wolfe detective novel by Rex Stout

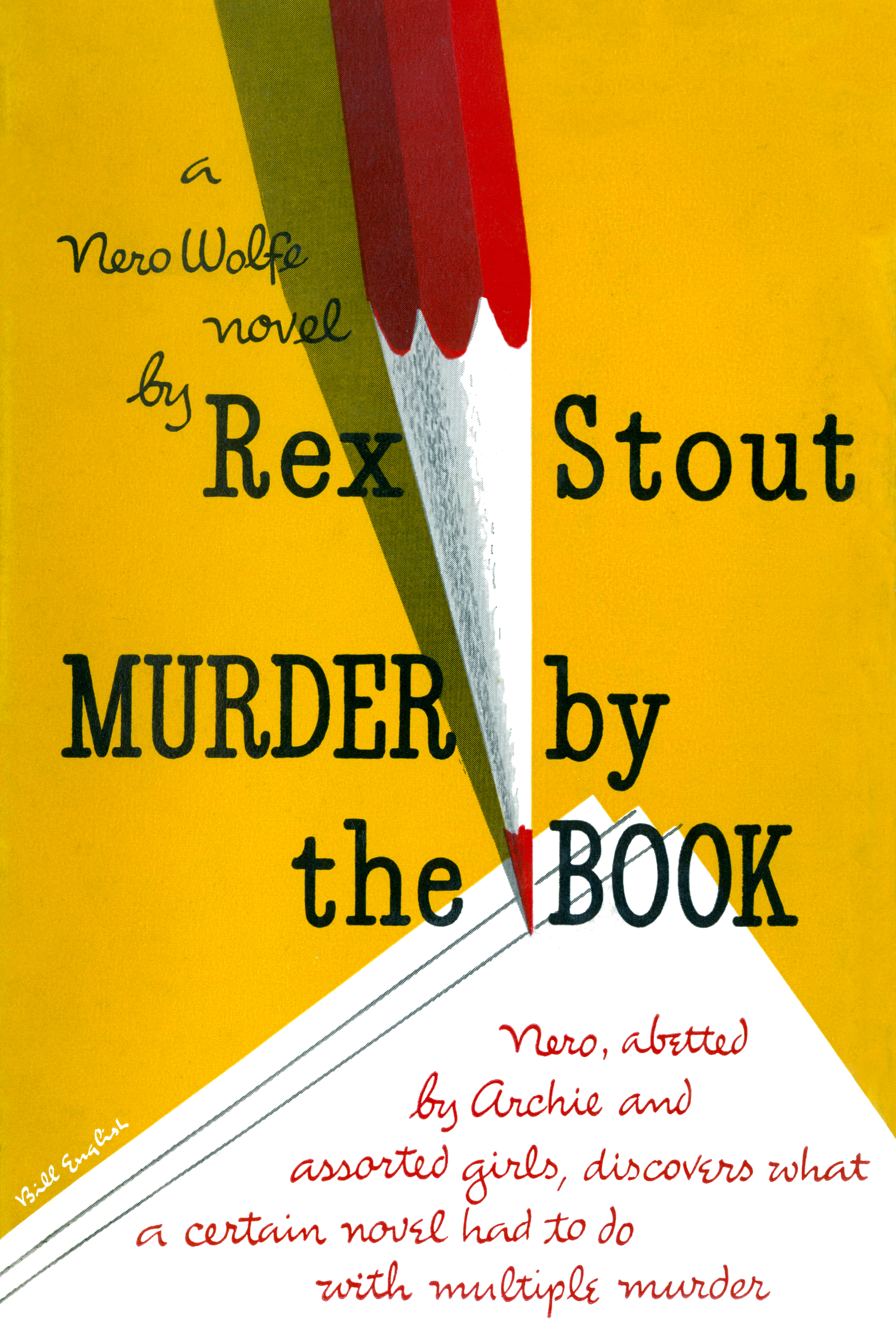
- First edition
- Author: Rex Stout
- Cover artist: Bill English
- Language: English
- Series: Nero Wolfe
- Genre: Detective fiction
- Publisher: Viking Press
- Publication date: October 12, 1951
- Publication place: United States
- Media type: Print (Hardcover)
- Pages: 248 (first edition)
- OCLC: 1468922
- Preceded by: Curtains for Three
- Followed by: Triple Jeopardy

Murder by the Book is a Nero Wolfe detective novel by Rex Stout published in 1951 by the Viking Press, and collected in the omnibus volume Royal Flush (1965).

== Plot summary ==
Inspector Cramer takes the unprecedented step of approaching Nero Wolfe for his help on a stalled murder investigation. Leonard Dykes, a clerk for a law partnership, was found dead in the East River. The police find in Dykes' apartment a list of men's names and Cramer wishes to have Wolfe's opinion on it. Other than suggesting Dykes may have been trying to invent an alias, Wolfe cannot help.

Six weeks later, the father of Joan Wellman approaches Wolfe. Joan, a reader for a fiction publisher, was killed in a hit-and-run incident late at night in Van Cortlandt Park. Wolfe reads a letter that Joan had written to her parents, realizing that the name Baird Archer, an author whose novel Joan was reading for her employer, appears on the list found in Leonard Dykes' apartment.

Archie Goodwin explores the link between Archer's novel and the two murder victims. To that end, Archie arrives at the office of Rachel Abrams, the stenographer who typed the manuscript, mere minutes after she is thrown out of a window to her death as a third victim. In the moments before the police arrive, Archie confirms that Baird Archer was one of her clients. Wolfe decides to investigate Dykes. Archie arranges a meeting with the female employees of Corrigan, Phelps, Kustin and Briggs, the law firm that employed Dykes. During the meeting, tempers flare. The former senior partner of the firm, Conroy O'Malley, is mentioned. O'Malley was disbarred for bribing a jury foreman to fix a case. Some blame Dykes for exposing him to the Bar Association; it becomes clear that all four of the partners have motives to betray O’Malley.

Soon after, the four lawyers —James Corrigan, Emmet Phelps, Louis Kustin and Frederick Briggs— approach Wolfe, keen to avoid further scandal. The men agree to send Wolfe all correspondence relating to Dykes. When they receive the packet, Wolfe and Archie discover an odd notation, apparently in Corrigan's handwriting, which corresponds to a verse in the Book of Psalms. The start of the same verse—"Put not your trust in princes, nor in the son of man, in whom there is no help"—was the title of Baird Archer's novel. This persuades Wolfe that Archer was a pen name of Dykes and his novel a roman à clef based on O'Malley's downfall.

Archie flies to Los Angeles to persuade Dykes's sister Peggy to help them trap her brother's murderer. Archie drafts a letter to the New York City law firm that Peggy signs, asking for advice over the legal rights of her brother's novel. He hires a local private detective to pose as a literary agent. Arrived in Los Angeles, James Corrigan tries unsuccessfully to acquire the manuscript, resorting to violence and attempted theft to read it. Archie tails Corrigan back to New York.

That evening, Wolfe receives a rambling phone call, apparently from James Corrigan, that ends abruptly with the sound of a gunshot. The police assess that Corrigan has committed suicide. The next day Wolfe receives an unsigned suicide note, typed, confessing to reporting bribery by O'Malley and committing all three murders to keep his secret. The police take it as typed by Corrigan, sufficient to judge his death as suicide and accept him as the triple murderer.

Wolfe has a breakthrough and summons the major witnesses to his office. There, he reveals that the supposed suicide note was flawed in one crucial respect; it claims that Corrigan was aware of the plot of Dykes's novel, when Corrigan clearly was not. Wolfe makes clear that Conroy O'Malley murdered Corrigan. O'Malley wanted revenge on Corrigan for reporting his bribery. O’Malley read Dykes's manuscript, deciding its plot was based on his own disbarment. O’Malley committed the other murders both to frame Corrigan and to set the scene to murder Corrigan with an appearance of suicide. After holes in O’Malley’s original alibi are discovered, Cramer charges O’Malley with murder, and the trial convicts him.

== Reviews and commentary ==
- Anthony Boucher, The New York Times Book Review (October 28, 1951) — For some years now Nero Wolfe has flourished best in novelettes ... The shorter exploits, annually collected in volumes of three, have been models of the middle-length detective story; but some of us have still yearned nostalgically for the days of such Wolfe novels as Too Many Cooks and The League of Frightened Men. It's a pleasure at last to report that in Murder by the Book Rex Stout restores Nero Wolfe to his proper place in the long detective novel. A man has been murdered presumably because of a novel which he wrote and which has completely disappeared; there is apparently as total an absence of clues as ever confronted a fictional detective. And the story is not so much one of detection, as of the ingenious efforts of Wolfe and the incomparable Archie Goodwin to find some conceivable starting point from which detection can be carried on. It's an odd and interesting approach; the solution is at once plausible and surprising (if not quite deductively watertight). Wolfe and Archie are both in top form and Stout has rarely done a better novelistic job of putting flesh on assorted minor characters.
- Stuart M. Kaminsky — I am a huge Stout fan. I've got a collection of the Wolfe novels and re-read them. I just finished reading Murder by the Book, definitely one of my favorites in the series. Check Stout's scenes of Archie in Los Angeles. They rank right up there with Chandler, and the characters — major and minor — are vivid and memorable, not to mention the great give-and-take between Wolfe and Archie.
- Nancy Pearl, Book Lust — When Stout is on top of his game, which is most of the time, his diabolically clever plotting and his storytelling ability exceed that of any other mystery writer you can name, including Agatha Christie, who invented her own eccentric genius detective Hercule Poirot. Although in the years since Stout's death I find myself going back and rereading his entire oeuvre every year or two, I return with particular pleasure to these five novels: The Doorbell Rang; Plot It Yourself; Murder by the Book; Champagne for One; and Gambit.
- Saturday Review of Literature (November 10, 1951) — Missing novel MS is lethal to NY quartet and disrupts high-toned law office, but orchidaphilic Nero Wolfe pins blue ribbon on felon. Usual scrupulous attention to, and skilled management of, detail; honest, lively, interest-holding performance.
- Terry Teachout, "Forty years with Nero Wolfe" (January 12, 2009) — Rex Stout's witty, fast-moving prose hasn't dated a day, while Wolfe himself is one of the enduringly great eccentrics of popular fiction. I've spent the past four decades reading and re-reading Stout's novels for pleasure, and they have yet to lose their savor ... It is to revel in such writing that I return time and again to Stout's books, and in particular to The League of Frightened Men, Some Buried Caesar, The Silent Speaker, Too Many Women, Murder by the Book, Before Midnight, Plot It Yourself, Too Many Clients, The Doorbell Rang, and Death of a Doxy, which are for me the best of all the full-length Wolfe novels.

== Adaptations ==
=== Nero Wolfe (Paramount Television) ===
Murder by the Book was adapted as the eighth episode of Nero Wolfe (1981), an NBC TV series starring William Conrad as Nero Wolfe and Lee Horsley as Archie Goodwin. Other members of the regular cast include George Voskovec (Fritz Brenner), Robert Coote (Theodore Horstmann), George Wyner (Saul Panzer) and Allan Miller (Inspector Cramer). Guest stars include Walter Brooke (George [Frederick] Briggs), Delta Burke (Jean Wellmann), Ed Gilbert (Robert [Emmett] Phelps), David Hedison (Phillip [James] Corrigan) and John Randolph (Ryan [Conroy] O'Malley). Directed by Bob Kelljan from a teleplay by Wallace Ware (David Karp), "Murder by the Book" aired March 13, 1981.

== Allusion to real event ==
During his foray to California, Archie Goodwin contracts with a local detective agency for a detective able to impersonate a literary agent, and rejects several candidates who don't fit the role. The one who is finally chosen (and performs to great satisfaction) surprises Goodwin by reading in his spare time a serious philosophical book named Twilight of the Absolute. (Goodwin himself, when later left alone, glances at this book but does not care to read it, preferring to pass his time with newspapers and magazines.)

Stout does not specify the name of the writer of Twilight of the Absolute. In fact it is a book by André Malraux, translated from French and published in the US by Pantheon Books in 1949, one year before the present book.

== Publication history ==
- 1951, New York: The Viking Press, October 12, 1951, hardcover

Bookseller and publisher Otto Penzler describes the first edition of Murder by the Book: "Yellow cloth, front cover and spine printed with red; rear cover blank. Issued in a yellow, red, black and white dust wrapper." In April 2006, Firsts: The Book Collector's Magazine estimated that the first edition of Murder by the Book (featured on the cover of the magazine) had a value of between $400 and $750. The estimate is for a copy in very good to fine condition in a like dustjacket.

- 1952, New York: Viking (Mystery Guild), January 1952, hardcover (Note: The far less valuable Viking book club edition may be distinguished from the first edition in three ways: The dust jacket has "Book Club Edition" printed on the inside front flap, and the price is absent (first editions may be price clipped if they were given as gifts).; Book club editions are sometimes thinner and always taller (usually a quarter of an inch) than first editions.; Book club editions are bound in cardboard, and first editions are bound in cloth (or have at least a cloth spine).)
- 1952, London: Collins Crime Club, April 7, 1952, hardcover
- 1954, New York: Bantam #1252, August 1954, paperback
- London: Collins (White Circle), #295c, not dated, paperback
- 1964, New York: The Viking Press, Royal Flush: The Fourth Nero Wolfe Omnibus (with Fer-de-Lance and Three Witnesses), July 23, 1965, hardcover
- 1967, London: Fontana #1534, 1967, paperback
- 1974, London: Penguin Books, ISBN 978-0-14-003806-4, 1974, paperback
- 1995, New York: Bantam ISBN 0-553-76311-3, September 1, 1995, paperback
- 2006, Auburn, California: The Audio Partners Publishing Corp., Mystery Masters ISBN 1-57270-536-1 June 28, 2006 [1995], CD (unabridged, read by Michael Prichard)
- 2010, New York: Bantam ISBN 978-0-307-75606-0, May 12, 2010, e-book
