= Home to Roost (short story) =

- Short story by Rex Stout
- Illustrated by Thornton Utz
- Original title: Nero Wolfe and the Communist Killer
- Country: United States
- Language: English
- Genre: Detective fiction

Publication
- Published in: The American Magazine
- Publication type: Periodical
- Publication date: January 1952
- Series: Nero Wolfe

"Home to Roost" is a Nero Wolfe mystery novella by Rex Stout, first published as "Nero Wolfe and the Communist Killer" in the January 1952 issue of The American Magazine. It first appeared in book form in the short-story collection Triple Jeopardy, published by the Viking Press in 1952. This novella and the 1949 novel The Second Confession are notable expressions of Stout's contempt for both Communism and McCarthyism.

== Plot summary ==
Benjamin and Pauline Rackell engage Wolfe to investigate the death of their nephew Arthur, paying him a $3,000 retainer. Arthur had begun to show increasing support for the Communist Party, but confided to Pauline that he had been recruited by the FBI to infiltrate the group's New York organization. At a dinner party, he had brought out a pillbox from his pocket, set it on the table, and taken one of the vitamin capsules inside, only to die a few minutes later from cyanide poisoning. The other capsules in the box were found to be genuine and harmless. Pauline insists that one of the other five dinner guests must have learned the truth about Arthur and slipped the poisoned capsule into the box while he was not paying attention.

Archie visits both the local FBI office and Manhattan Homicide but is unable to get any useful information; at Wolfe's request, he arranges a meeting with the Rackells and the dinner guests at Wolfe's office. Of these latter five - Ormond Leddegard, Fifi Goheen, Della Devlin, Henry Jameson Heath, Carol Berk - only Heath is known to have ties to the Communist Party. Wolfe questions the group about the dinner party and the pillbox, not mentioning Arthur's FBI status in order to avoid tipping them off, and inadvertently sparks a confrontation between Della and Fifi over Heath's affections. Fifi says that Arthur told her he lied to Pauline about working for the FBI, a claim Pauline adamantly denies.

The next day, Archie engages Saul Panzer, Fred Durkin, and Orrie Cather to keep Heath under constant surveillance and arranges for the Rackells to see Wolfe again. Wolfe tells them that he is convinced there was an eyewitness to Arthur's murder, and offers to find that person and get the truth for a fee of $20,000. Benjamin is unconvinced, but Pauline is eager to accept the offer, and Wolfe sends Archie to visit Della and Carol in their shared apartment that night. Della says that Carol has gone to a show, but Archie finds her hiding in a closet and listening in. After she leaves, he offers Della $10,000 to tell the police that she had seen Fifi switch the capsules; she does not immediately say yes or no, and he leaves to update Wolfe and Saul.

The next morning, both Inspector Cramer and FBI Agent Wengert visit the office to confront Wolfe. They have learned of Archie's offer to Della and are furious, but Wolfe points out that their best course of action is to let him proceed, neither supporting nor opposing his plans. Archie gets updates on Heath's movements throughout the day, culminating in a meeting with a woman in Central Park at which Saul is eavesdropping. Arriving at the location, Archie finds that the woman is Pauline and brings both of them to the office. With Saul's corroboration, Wolfe determines that Heath arranged the meeting in order to persuade Pauline not to pay for Wolfe's scheme to get Fifi convicted.

Wolfe reveals that his offer to the Rackells was meant to draw out the murderer, as he had no concrete evidence or witnesses. He accuses Pauline of Arthur's murder, having become suspicious of her after she accepted his offer so quickly. She had seen it as a way to frame someone else for her crime and keep her own Communist leanings from becoming public. Wolfe pressures Heath into agreeing to tell him how much Pauline has contributed to the party, in order to keep himself from being associated with her criminal trial.

The next day, while Cramer and Wengert are going over the details of the case with Wolfe, Archie reveals that he knows who had been the real infiltrator sent by the FBI. It was Carol, who would have learned about the $10,000 offer from Della and was the only person who could have informed Wengert of it so quickly. Now that the case is over, she accepts Archie's offer of a drink.

== Cast of characters ==
- Nero Wolfe — Famous detective
- Archie Goodwin — Wolfe's assistant; the narrator of all Wolfe stories
- Benjamin Rackell — Importer; uncle of murder victim Arthur Rackell
- Pauline Rackell — Wife of Benjamin Rackell
- Henry Jameson Heath — Communist supporter; manager of the local organization's bail fund
- Mr. Wengert — FBI agent
- Fifi Goheen — Park Avenue playgirl
- Della Devlin — Novelties buyer
- Carol Berk — FBI undercover girl
- Ormond Leddegard — Labor relations specialist
- Inspector Cramer — Of Manhattan Homicide
- Saul Panzer, Fred Durkin, Orrie Cather — Freelance detectives employed by Wolfe

== Background ==
I deplore the current tendency to accuse people of pro-communism irresponsibly and unjustly …

— Nero Wolfe, "Home to Roost", chapter 8

In "Nero Wolfe and the Communist Killer", Nero Wolfe exposes a Communist while at the same time disassociating himself from McCarthyism. The novella was written July 27–August 10, 1951. In November of that year, Rex Stout succeeded Oscar Hammerstein II as president of the Authors League, which included the Authors Guild and Dramatists Guild. Stout had been a leader in the organization for many years as a champion of authors' rights and freedom from censorship. In January 1952 — the month "Nero Wolfe and the Communist Killer" appeared in The American Magazine — Stout was instrumental in drafting the Authors League's statement against the blacklisting of writers whose names appeared in Red Channels. That same month Stout also helped draft a Freedom House declaration condemning Red-baiting. "Wild accusations and inexcusable inaccuracies serve to divide and confuse the country when we should be united in the task of resisting Communist aggression abroad and Communist subversion at home," the declaration stated.

When the novella (as "Home to Roost") was collected in Triple Jeopardy, Stout received "hate mail", reported John J. McAleer in his Edgar Award-winning Rex Stout: A Biography (1977):

A letter from one reader deplored two of the tales, "The Cop-Killer" and "Home to Roost", as "those two little stinker anti-Communist stories." By this time McCarthyism had brewed such tensions that even Anthony Boucher said aloud he wished Wolfe would find another adversary. Boucher's protest confirmed Rex's belief that McCarthy helped Communism by making anti-Communism seem reactionary.

His leadership of the Authors League during the McCarthy Era was a principal reason Stout was regarded as either a Communist or a tool of Communist-dominated groups by J. Edgar Hoover's FBI. He was one of the many authors watched closely by the bureau, which maintained a sizable dossier on him.

== Reviews and commentary ==
"The story's original title, 'Nero Wolfe and the Communist Killer,' supplies the appropriate emphasis," wrote J. Kenneth Van Dover in At Wolfe's Door: The Nero Wolfe Novels of Rex Stout. "As in The Second Confession, the party is quick to disown an errant member, but Party membership functions as a primary motive for the crime. Wolfe bulldozes the FBI with the same smugness as he bulldozes the city police."

== Publication history ==
=== "Home to Roost" ===
- 1952, The American Magazine, January 1952 (as "Nero Wolfe and the Communist Killer")
- 1970, Ellery Queen's Mystery Magazine #314, January 1970 (as "Nero Wolfe Devises a Stratagem")
- 1974, Ellery Queen's Anthology #28, Fall–Winter 1974 (as "Nero Wolfe Devises a Stratagem")

=== Triple Jeopardy ===
- 1952, New York: The Viking Press, March 21, 1952, hardcover

Contents include "Home to Roost", "The Cop-Killer" and "The Squirt and the Monkey"
In his limited-edition pamphlet, Collecting Mystery Fiction #9, Rex Stout's Nero Wolfe Part I, Otto Penzler describes the first edition of Triple Jeopardy: "Yellow cloth, front cover and spine printed with black; rear cover blank. Issued in a black, white, and purple dust wrapper."
In April 2006, Firsts: The Book Collector's Magazine estimated that the first edition of Triple Jeopardy had a value of between $300 and $500.

- 1952, New York: The Viking Press (Mystery Guild), July 1952, hardcover

The far less valuable Viking book club edition may be distinguished from the first edition in three ways:

- The dust jacket has "Book Club Edition" printed on the inside front flap, and the price is absent (first editions may be price clipped if they were given as gifts).
- Book club editions are sometimes thinner and always taller (usually a quarter of an inch) than first editions.
- Book club editions are bound in cardboard, and first editions are bound in cloth (or have at least a cloth spine).

- 1952, London: Collins Crime Club, October 13, 1952, hardcover
- 1957, New York: Bantam #A-1631, July 1957, paperback
- 1969, New York: The Viking Press, Kings Full of Aces: A Nero Wolfe Omnibus (with Too Many Cooks and Plot It Yourself), January 28, 1969, hardcover
- 1993, New York: Bantam Books (Rex Stout Library) ISBN 0-553-76307-5, April 1993, introduction by Aaron Elkins, paperback
- 1997, Newport Beach, California: Books on Tape, Inc. ISBN 0-7366-3748-6 July 21, 1997, audio cassette (unabridged, read by Michael Prichard)
- 2010, New York: Bantam ISBN 978-0-307-75630-5 April 28, 2010, e-book
