= The Cop-Killer (short story) =

- Short story by Rex Stout
- Original title: The Cop Killer
- Country: United States
- Language: English
- Genre: Detective fiction

Publication
- Published in: The American Magazine
- Publication type: Periodical
- Publication date: February 1951
- Series: Nero Wolfe

"The Cop-Killer" is a Nero Wolfe mystery novella by Rex Stout, first published as "The Cop Killer" in the February 1951 issue of The American Magazine. It first appeared in book form in the short-story collection Triple Jeopardy, published by the Viking Press in 1952.

== Plot ==
Returning to the brownstone from his morning errands, Archie finds two surprise visitors waiting for him on the stoop: Carl and Tina Vardas, both of whom work at the barbershop that Wolfe and Archie frequent. Jacob Wallen, a police detective, had visited the shop earlier in the day in order to question the employees as to their whereabouts on the previous night. After he had questioned Carl and Tina separately, they fled the shop for fear of being deported back to their native Russia, from which they had illegally made their way to New York City three years earlier. Archie puts them in the front room, tells Wolfe of their arrival, and goes to the shop.

Several police officers, including Sergeant Purley Stebbins, are already there when he arrives, and Inspector Cramer arrives soon afterward. Wallen has been found dead in a manicurist's cubicle, stabbed in the back with a pair of scissors. While waiting for a shave, Archie learns that Wallen had been investigating a hit-and-run accident the previous night in which two women were struck and killed by a stolen car, and he had carried that evening's newspaper with him. He had used the cubicle for his questioning, and his body was found there some minutes after talking to the last of the employees. Since Carl and Tina fled the shop, suspicion falls on them first. Janet Stahl, a manicurist, claims in overly dramatic fashion that she killed Wallen, but Archie does not believe her.

Once his shave is finished, Archie returns to the brownstone and finds Wolfe eating lunch with Carl and Tina. Further questioning of the couple reveals that neither of them knows how to drive a car, which is enough in Archie's mind to clear them of any guilt in the hit-and-run. They remember that Wallen had carried his newspaper flat as if it had just come off the newsstand, rather than rolled or folded up in his coat pocket, and had set it down that way on the table in the cubicle. Surprised by the arrival of Cramer, Archie moves them into the front room in order to keep him from finding them. Cramer is unconvinced that Archie's visit for a shave was only a coincidence, especially since he has never gone to the shop for only a shave, but cannot see how any of the employees could afford Wolfe's fees. During the visit, Cramer learns from a phone call that Janet has been injured.

Returning to the shop, Archie finds Janet recovering from a blow to the head and willing to talk only to him. She again over-dramatizes the incident, claiming that Stebbins assaulted her, but Archie uses her theatrics to question her further about the timeline of the morning's events. He calls in with an update for Wolfe, who soon surprises everyone by showing up for a haircut and asking for his usual barber, Jimmie Kirk. As Jimmie begins to work, Wolfe addresses the group with a list of assumptions he has made concerning the hit-and-run and Wallen's death:

- That Wallen found some object in the car to lead him to the shop
- That he carried it with him when he entered the shop
- That it was inside his newspaper
- That the murderer found and either moved or hid it
- That neither Carl nor Tina was the murderer
- That the object is still inside the shop
- That no proper search for it has yet been made

With prompting from Wolfe, including a suggestion to check the shop for Wallen's fingerprints, Cramer realizes that the object in question must have been one of the magazines in the waiting area, which are labeled with the shop's name and address. Janet remembers seeing Jimmie carrying one wrapped in a hot towel, as if he had been steaming it, and Jimmie dives for the magazines only to be tackled and arrested. He had jumped bail in West Virginia on an assortment of charges, including auto theft; while working at the shop, he had developed a habit of stealing its magazines, one of which he left in the car after abandoning it. Wolfe grumbles over the inconvenience of losing his barber to a murder charge.

In the final chapter, Archie suggests that Wolfe call in a few favors with Washington officials so that Carl and Tina can legally remain in the United States. Wolfe comments that he has been a naturalized citizen for 24 years.

== Publication history ==
=== "The Cop-Killer" ===
- 1951, The American Magazine, February 1951 (as "The Cop Killer")
- 1952, Ellery Queen's Mystery Magazine #100, March 1952 (as "The Cop Killer")
- 1954, Ellery Queen's Mystery Magazine, British edition #23, December 1954 (as "The Cop Killer")
- 1960, Ellery Queen's Anthology #1, 1960 (as "The Cop Killer")
- 1964, Best Detective Stories 2, edited by Edmund Crispin; London: Faber and Faber, 1964
- 1994, Burlington, Ontario: Durkin Hayes Publishing, DH Audio ISBN 0-88646-705-5 July 1994, audio cassette (unabridged, read by Saul Rubinek)

=== Triple Jeopardy ===
- 1952, New York: The Viking Press, March 21, 1952, hardcover

Contents include "Home to Roost", "The Cop-Killer" and "The Squirt and the Monkey".
In his limited-edition pamphlet, Collecting Mystery Fiction #9, Rex Stout's Nero Wolfe Part I, Otto Penzler describes the first edition of Triple Jeopardy: "Yellow cloth, front cover and spine printed with black; rear cover blank. Issued in a black, white, and purple dust wrapper."
In April 2006, Firsts: The Book Collector's Magazine estimated that the first edition of Triple Jeopardy had a value of between $300 and $500.

- 1952, New York: The Viking Press (Mystery Guild), July 1952, hardcover

The far less valuable Viking book club edition may be distinguished from the first edition in three ways:

- The dust jacket has "Book Club Edition" printed on the inside front flap, and the price is absent (first editions may be price clipped if they were given as gifts).
- Book club editions are sometimes thinner and always taller (usually a quarter of an inch) than first editions.
- Book club editions are bound in cardboard, and first editions are bound in cloth (or have at least a cloth spine).

- 1952, London: Collins Crime Club, October 13, 1952, hardcover
- 1957, New York: Bantam #A-1631, July 1957, paperback
- 1969, New York: The Viking Press, Kings Full of Aces: A Nero Wolfe Omnibus (with Too Many Cooks and Plot It Yourself), January 28, 1969, hardcover
- 1993, New York: Bantam Books (Rex Stout Library) ISBN 0-553-76307-5, April 1993, introduction by Aaron Elkins, paperback
- 1997, Newport Beach, California: Books on Tape, Inc. ISBN 0-7366-3748-6 July 21, 1997, audio cassette (unabridged, read by Michael Prichard)
- 2010, New York: Bantam ISBN 978-0-307-75630-5 April 28, 2010, e-book

== Adaptations ==
=== Nero Wolfe (A&E Network) ===
"The Cop-Killer" was adapted for the second season of the A&E TV series A Nero Wolfe Mystery (2001–2002). Written by Jennifer Salt and directed by John R. Pepper, "Cop Killer" made its debut August 11, 2002, on A&E.

Timothy Hutton is Archie Goodwin; Maury Chaykin is Nero Wolfe. Other members of the cast (in credits order) include Kari Matchett (Janet Stahl), Nicky Guadagni (Tina Vardas), Hrant Alianak (Carl Vardas), Bill Smitrovich (Inspector Cramer), James Tolkan (Ed Graboff), Colin Fox (Fritz Brenner), R. D. Reid (Sergeant Purley Stebbins), Boyd Banks (Jimmie Kirk), Ken Kramer (Joel Fickler), Robbie Rox (Philip), Angelo Tsarouchas (Flatfoot Cop) and Doug Lennox (Detective Jacob Wallen).

In addition to original music by Nero Wolfe composer Michael Small, the soundtrack includes music by Robert Cornford (titles), Gioachino Rossini (opening sequence), Franz Schubert, David Steinberg and Dick Walter.

A Nero Wolfe Mystery is available on DVD from A&E Home Video (ISBN 0-7670-8893-X).

=== Nero Wolfe (CBC Radio) ===
"The Cop-Killer" was adapted as the fourth episode of the Canadian Broadcasting Corporation's 13-part radio series Nero Wolfe (1982), starring Mavor Moore as Nero Wolfe, Don Francks as Archie Goodwin, and Cec Linder as Inspector Cramer. Written and directed by Toronto actor and producer Ron Hartmann, the hour-long adaptation aired on CBC Stereo February 6, 1982.
