= The Squirt and the Monkey =

- Short story by Rex Stout
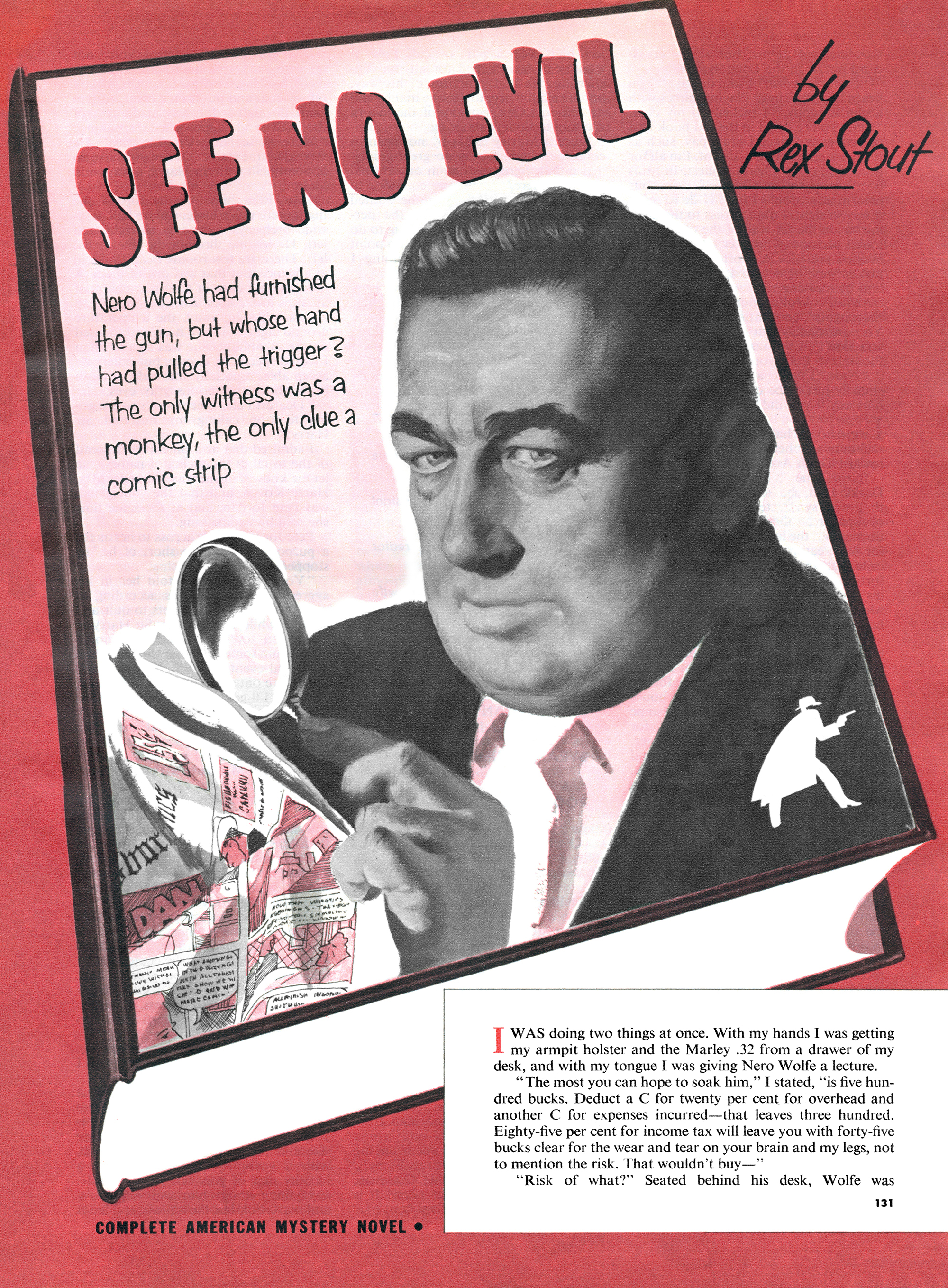
- Illustrated by Thornton Utz
- Original title: See No Evil
- Country: United States
- Language: English
- Genre: Detective fiction

Publication
- Published in: The American Magazine
- Publication type: Periodical
- Publication date: August 1951
- Series: Nero Wolfe

"The Squirt and the Monkey" is a Nero Wolfe mystery novella by Rex Stout, first published as "See No Evil" in the August 1951 issue of The American Magazine. It first appeared in book form in the short-story collection Triple Jeopardy, published by the Viking Press in 1952.

== Plot ==
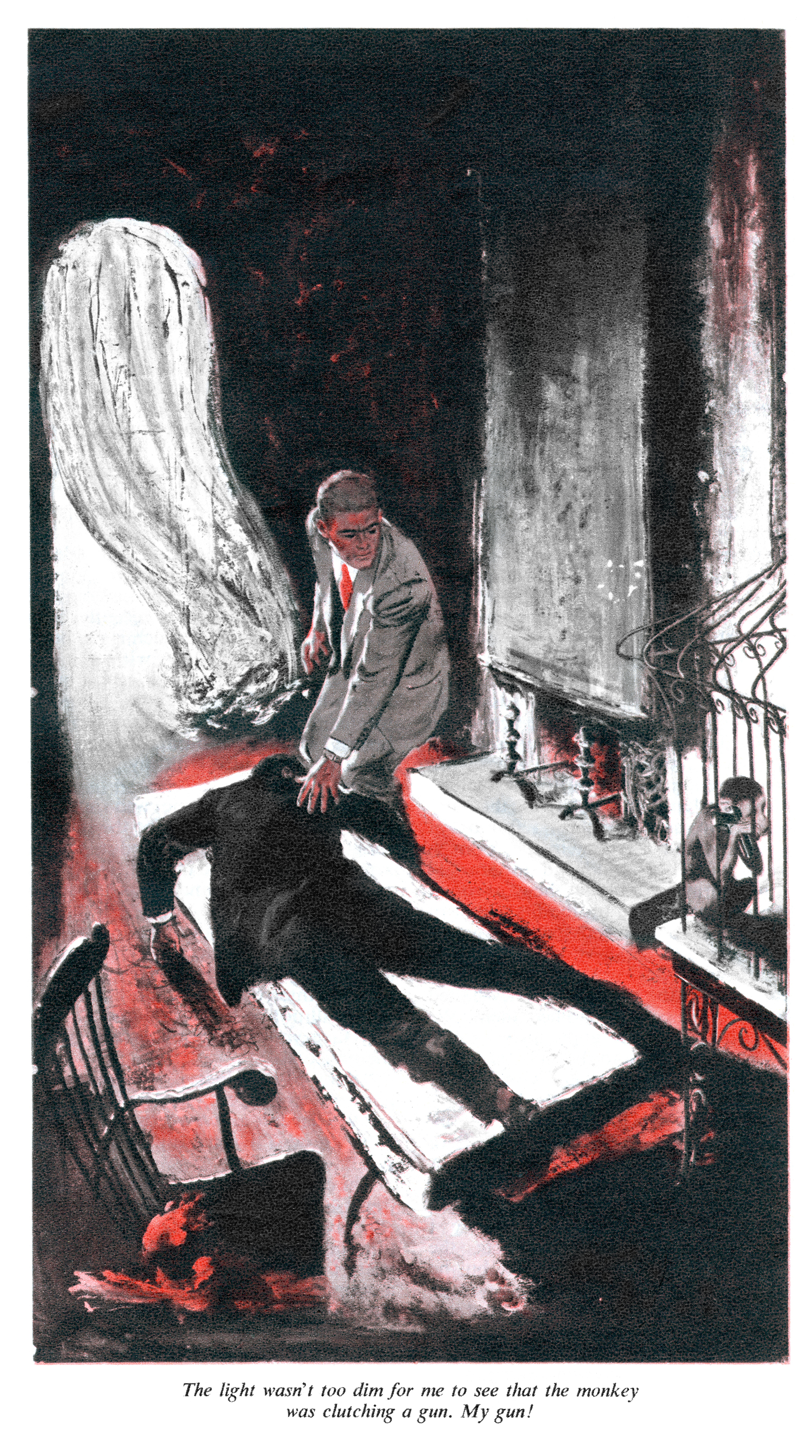
"The Squirt and the Monkey" first appeared in The American Magazine (August 1951), with illustrations by Thornton Utz

Archie Goodwin takes an unusual assignment to help cartoonist Harry Koven recover a gun that has been stolen from a desk drawer in his home office. Harry, creator of the popular Dazzle Dan comic strip, intends to have Archie place his own gun—the same model as the stolen one—in the drawer, then open the drawer in the presence of the five people he suspects of the theft and watch their reactions. These five are Harry's wife Marcelle, his friend Adrian Getz (nicknamed "Squirt" by Harry), his agent/manager Patricia Lowell, and strip artists Pete Jordan and Byram Hildebrand.

Arriving at the Kovens' house, Archie is escorted to a room with a blazing fireplace; the heat is for the benefit of Rookaloo, a pet monkey kept in a cage in this room. After Archie puts his own (unloaded) gun in Harry's desk drawer, Harry becomes indecisive about his plan and asks for time to gather his courage, during which Archie meets the other five and learns of various tensions between them. Several hours later, once Harry is ready to proceed, he and Archie re-check the drawer only to find that Archie's gun has been switched for Harry's. Archie subsequently finds Getz lying dead in Rookaloo's room, shot in the head, and Rookaloo is holding Archie's gun (now loaded) and shivering in a draft from a now-open window.

When the police arrive, Archie makes a full statement and is then arrested by Inspector Cramer for violating the Sullivan Act, since he had been carrying Harry's gun at the time and did not have a permit for it. Cramer's decision is based on Harry's untruthful account of the day's events, in which he claims that he only invited Archie to discuss the idea of introducing a detective storyline into Dazzle Dan. Wolfe's detective license is suspended; he secures Archie's release on bail the next day—for both the weapons charge and a material witness warrant that has been sworn out against him—and files a $1 million slander lawsuit against Harry for damaging his reputation.

Wolfe has the past three years' worth of Gazette issues delivered to the office, and Lon Cohen briefs Archie on various grudges that Harry and the others have against Getz, who turns out to be the owner of the Kovens' house. Later that day, Wolfe and Archie have a hidden tape recorder installed in the office, with controls in the kitchen. Wolfe searches through the Dazzle Dan strips in the Gazette and takes interest in two characters, Aggie Ghool and Haggie Krool, who have a severely lopsided business relationship that favors Aggie. When Patricia stops by the office, Wolfe questions her about portrayals of a monkey in the strip—first depicted maliciously, then suddenly made to appear sympathetic. Patricia admits that Jordan and Hildebrand have very different opinions about Rookaloo, explaining the shift, and also says that she gave it to Getz, who in turn left it in Marcelle's care without asking her. Patricia denies Wolfe's statement of a rumor that the idea for Dazzle Dan originally came from Getz.

That night, Wolfe gathers the principals in his office and allows Cramer to attend as well, on the condition that he remain silent and observe through the office peephole for the first half-hour of the meeting. Wolfe secretly records a portion of the conversation, then plays it back in order to leverage information out of the group. The Aggie/Haggie characters represent the uneven split between Getz and Harry, as indicated by their initials (A.G. and H.K.); Getz, the strip's actual creator, took a 90% share of its revenues and allowed Harry only 10%. Marcelle reveals that she had tried to persuade Harry to stand up to Getz and denounces him for never having the courage to do so. She tries to blame Harry for the murder, but Wolfe points out that her disdain for Rookaloo led her to open the window in the hope that the draft would kill it—a mistake that proves her guilt. Cramer places Marcelle under arrest, with Wolfe's admonishment that he would have been able to close the case much sooner if he had believed Archie's statement.

== Publication history ==
=== "The Squirt and the Monkey" ===
- 1951, The American Magazine, August 1951 (as "See No Evil")
- 1966, Ellery Queen's Mystery Magazine #272, July 1966 (as "The Dazzle Dan Murder Case")
- 1972, Ellery Queen's Anthology #24, Fall–Winter 1972 (as "The Dazzle Dan Murder Case")
- 1977, Ellery Queen's Cops and Capers, edited by Ellery Queen; New York: Davis Publications ISBN 0-89559-001-8, 1977

=== Triple Jeopardy ===
- 1952, New York: The Viking Press, March 21, 1952, hardcover
  Contents include "Home to Roost", "The Cop-Killer" and "The Squirt and the Monkey".
  In his limited-edition pamphlet, Collecting Mystery Fiction #9, Rex Stout's Nero Wolfe Part I, Otto Penzler describes the first edition of Triple Jeopardy: "Yellow cloth, front cover and spine printed with black; rear cover blank. Issued in a black, white, and purple dust wrapper."
  In April 2006, Firsts: The Book Collector's Magazine estimated that the first edition of Triple Jeopardy had a value of between $300 and $500.
- 1952, New York: The Viking Press (Mystery Guild), July 1952, hardcover
  The far less valuable Viking book club edition may be distinguished from the first edition in three ways:
  - The dust jacket has "Book Club Edition" printed on the inside front flap, and the price is absent (first editions may be price clipped if they were given as gifts).
  - Book club editions are sometimes thinner and always taller (usually a quarter of an inch) than first editions.
  - Book club editions are bound in cardboard, and first editions are bound in cloth (or have at least a cloth spine).
- 1952, London: Collins Crime Club, October 13, 1952, hardcover
- 1957, New York: Bantam #A-1631, July 1957, paperback
- 1969, New York: The Viking Press, Kings Full of Aces: A Nero Wolfe Omnibus (with Too Many Cooks and Plot It Yourself), January 28, 1969, hardcover
- 1993, New York: Bantam Books (Rex Stout Library) ISBN 0-553-76307-5, April 1993, introduction by Aaron Elkins, paperback
- 1997, Newport Beach, California: Books on Tape, Inc. ISBN 0-7366-3748-6 July 21, 1997, audio cassette (unabridged, read by Michael Prichard)
- 2010, New York: Bantam ISBN 978-0-307-75630-5 April 28, 2010, e-book

== Adaptations ==
=== Nero Wolfe (CBC Radio) ===
"The Squirt and the Monkey" was adapted as the 10th episode of the Canadian Broadcasting Corporation's 13-part radio series Nero Wolfe (1982), starring Mavor Moore as Nero Wolfe, Don Francks as Archie Goodwin, and Cec Linder as Inspector Cramer. Written and directed by Toronto actor and producer Ron Hartmann, the hour-long adaptation aired on CBC Stereo March 20, 1982.
