= Champagne for One =

1958 novel by Rex Stout

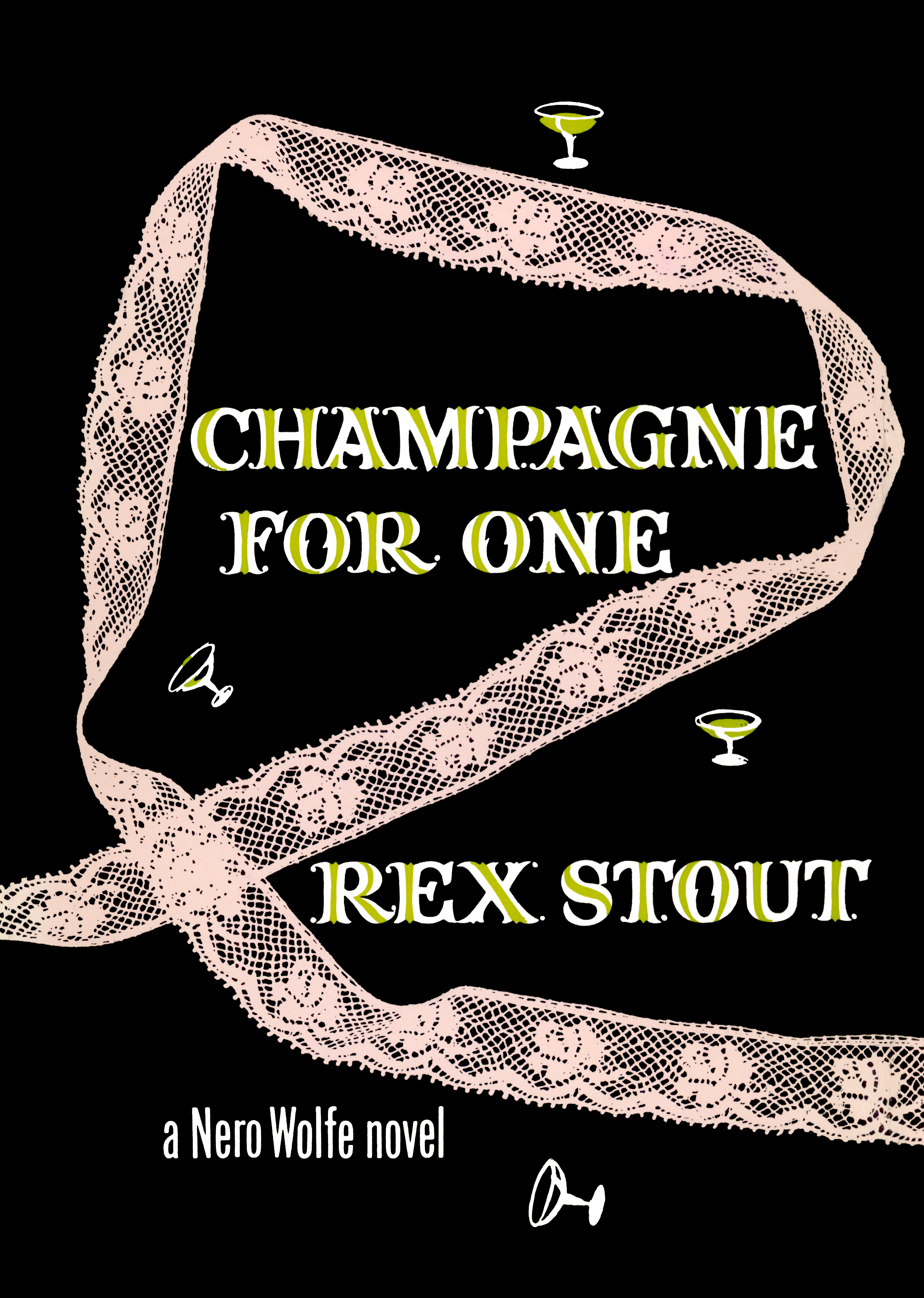
- Author: Rex Stout
- Cover artist: Bill English
- Language: English
- Series: Nero Wolfe
- Genre: Detective fiction
- Publisher: Viking Press
- Publication date: November 24, 1958
- Publication place: United States
- Media type: Print (Hardcover)
- Pages: 184 pp. (first edition)
- OCLC: 8604606
- Preceded by: And Four to Go
- Followed by: Plot It Yourself

Champagne for One is a Nero Wolfe detective novel by Rex Stout, first published by the Viking Press in 1958. The back matter of the 1995 Bantam edition of this book includes an exchange of correspondence between Stout and his editor at Viking Press, Marshall Best. A letter from Stout to Best, dated July 1958, shows that Stout suggested as a title both "Champagne for One" and also "Champagne for Faith Usher." Best's reply states that Viking was quite satisfied with "Champagne for One."

== Plot introduction ==
She danced cheerfully, and of course that was no good. You can't dance cheerfully. Dancing is too important. It can be wild or solemn or gay or lewd or art for art's sake, but it can't be cheerful. For one thing, if you're cheerful you talk too much.

— Archie, missing a dancing partner as good as Celia Grantham, in Champagne for One, chapter 3.

Archie Goodwin fills in for a friend at a charity dinner dance for unwed mothers, and one of the guests drops dead on the dance floor.

== Plot summary ==
Archie Goodwin receives a phone call from an acquaintance, Austin "Dinky" Byne, asking for a favor. Byne routinely acts as a chevalier, one of four male guests, for an annual dinner hosted by his aunt, Louise Grantham Robilotti. The dinner is given in honor of four young unwed mothers living at Grantham House, a charity supported by her late husband. Byne claims to have a cold and is unable to attend. Although skeptical of that cold, Archie agrees to stand in for him, despite Mrs. Robilotti's being a former client who bears him a personal dislike. During the dinner, Archie learns from one of the young women, Rose, that another, Faith Usher, has a bottle of cyanide in her purse. Faith has been talking of suicide during her pregnancy, and Rose fears that she might attempt suicide. Archie promises to watch over Faith. Towards the end of the evening Faith collapses and dies from cyanide poisoning after drinking a swallow from a glass of champagne.

Alone of the guests, Archie maintains that Faith Usher did not commit suicide, claiming that he observed her constantly throughout the evening and that she never had an opportunity to place the cyanide from her bottle into her glass. Although the authorities and the other guests pressure Archie into changing his story, Nero Wolfe believes him and decides to settle the matter by solving the case himself. He is given further incentive to do so when Edwin Laidlaw, another of the guests, approaches him to hire his services. Laidlaw says he is the father of Faith Usher's child after a brief affair they had the previous year. Ashamed of his conduct, he is desperate that his secret not be revealed.

Although Wolfe's investigation begins unpromisingly, his confidence that her death was murder grows when the police receive an anonymous tip revealing Laidlaw's secret. While the police are skeptical because it is anonymous, Wolfe says that someone else knows Laidlaw's secret and is agitated by the ongoing investigation. His investigations focus on both Faith Usher's estranged mother Elaine, herself an unwed mother, and Dinky Byne, whose reasons for canceling on the party look suspect given the event. He assigns Saul Panzer and Archie to follow the two respectively, leading to a break in the case when both Archie and Saul tail their respective targets to the same location: a restaurant where Elaine Usher and Dinky Byne are meeting with each other.

Speaking with Wolfe, both Byne and Elaine Usher lie to him. Their stories are inconsistent. Byne admits that he knew that Laidlaw was the father of Faith Usher's child, and says that he invited both to the dinner without their knowledge as a spiteful prank. During this conversation at the brownstone, Orrie Cather infiltrates Elaine’s hotel room and discovers a letter revealing that Mrs. Robilotti's deceased first husband, Albert Grantham, was the father of Faith Usher, and was supporting the mother and daughter via a trust managed by Byne. This, coupled with some comments from Byne, leads Wolfe to identify the murderer.

Summoning the hosts and the guests to his office, he has them reenact the circumstances under which Faith Usher received the poisoned champagne from Cecil Grantham multiple times. Mrs. Robilotti's son Cecil had a routine way of handing over a glass with his left hand, while taking for himself the glass in his right hand. A watchful person can see an opportunity in that.

Wolfe accuses Mrs. Robilotti of poisoning Faith Usher; Byne was perhaps blackmailing her with the knowledge that her former husband was Faith's father and invited Faith to the dinner as a threat. Mrs. Robilotti murdered Faith out of resentment over her husband's affair. Learning that Faith was in the habit of carrying cyanide, Mrs. Robilotti perhaps acquired some from another source to make it look like a suicide. The notion of the cyanide purchase is proved true by the police and Mrs. Robilotti is taken into custody, and found guilty in court. Archie is vindicated.

== Themes ==
=== Changing sexual mores ===
The book reflects the transitional situation of American sexual mores at the time of writing, on the verge of the sexual revolution of the 1960s. Unwed mothers are a major issue in the book, and constitute a large part of its cast of characters. They are presented sympathetically, but still unwed motherhood is presented as "a problem" for which they need to be helped. The preferred solution is to provide a friendly and supportive environment during pregnancy and to have the baby given over to adoption immediately upon birth. The option of the unwed mother keeping and raising her child is presented as a far more problematic idea. Indeed—as it ultimately turns out—it has much to do with the circumstances that led to the murder being investigated.

In chapter 2 Archie Goodwin is rather shocked to discover that one of the young women, Rose Tuttle, had given birth outside marriage not once but twice. He recounts at length his moral dilemma at hearing this: "I had on my shoulders the responsibility for the moral and social position of the community, at least in part (...). To list my objections would have been fine if I had been ordained, but I hadn't, and anyway she had certainly heard these objections before and hadn't been impressed. (...) While it was none of my business if she kept on having babies, I absolutely wasn't going to encourage her."

On the other hand, in chapter 6 Archie is surprised to learn that Edwin Laidlaw seriously expects his bride-to-be to remain a virgin until their wedding night. His reaction to this is scathing: "Laidlaw turned out to have an old-fashioned streak (...) an old fogey at thirty-one."

== The unfamiliar word ==
In most Nero Wolfe novels and novellas, there is at least one unfamiliar word, usually spoken by Wolfe. Champagne for One contains but one example, apart from the legalese respondeat superior found in Chapter 9. (In Chapter 2 the reader is also treated to a discussion of the derivation of protocol from the Greek proto, "first," and kollon, "glue".)

On page 202 of the 1996 Bantam edition, in Chapter 16, Wolfe says, "You have trimmed long enough." The word "trimmed" is not itself unfamiliar, but the usage may be.

== Characters ==
- Nero Wolfe – the private investigator
- Archie Goodwin – Wolfe's assistant (and the narrator of all Wolfe stories)
- Mr. and Mrs. Robert Robilotti – a wealthy heiress who inherited the fortune of her first husband, Mr. Grantham, and her current husband
- Faith Usher, Helen Yarmis, Rose Tuttle, and Ethel Varr – the four unwed-mother guests at a dinner party given by Mrs. Robilotti
- Elaine Usher – Faith's estranged mother
- Austin "Dinky" Byne – Mr. Grantham's nephew
- Edwin Laidlaw – a publisher who is terrified that his prior relationship with Faith Usher will be exposed by the investigation into her death
- Cecil and Celia Grantham – Mrs. Robilotti's twin son and daughter from her first marriage
- Paul Schuster and Beverly Kent – along with Edwin Laidlaw and Archie Goodwin, dinner partners for the young women at the party, called chevaliers
- Inspector Cramer and Sergeant Purley Stebbins – Manhattan homicide police
- Saul Panzer, Fred Durkin, and Orrie Cather – freelance detectives often employed by Wolfe

== Reviews and commentary ==
- Jacques Barzun and Wendell Hertig Taylor, A Catalogue of Crime – "Archie and Nero shine, once again, on the question: Who slipped the cyanide into the glass of the girl attending the unwed mothers' annual party at the house of their benefactress? Two small queries: would the dead philanthropist write the odd letter of gift that provides no better control of large funds than someone's probity? And how was the poison actually administered? One can't buy ready-mixed KCN."
- Nancy Pearl, Book Lust – "When Stout is on top of his game, which is most of the time, his diabolically clever plotting and his storytelling ability exceed that of any other mystery writer you can name, including Agatha Christie, who invented her own eccentric genius detective Hercule Poirot. Although in the years since Stout's death I find myself going back and rereading his entire oeuvre every year or two, I return with particular pleasure to these five novels: The Doorbell Rang; Plot It Yourself; Murder by the Book; Champagne for One; and Gambit."

== Adaptations ==
=== Nero Wolfe (A&E Network) ===
Screenwriters Lee Goldberg and William Rabkin adapted Champagne for One for the second episode of the A&E TV series A Nero Wolfe Mystery (2001–2002), a Jaffe/Braunstein Films coproduction with the A&E Network. The second of four Nero Wolfe episodes directed by executive producer and star Timothy Hutton, "Champagne for One" made its debut in two one-hour episodes airing April 29 and May 6, 2001, on A&E.

Timothy Hutton is Archie Goodwin; Maury Chaykin is Nero Wolfe. Other members of the cast (in credits order) are Bill Smitrovich (Inspector Cramer), Colin Fox (Fritz Brenner), James Tolkan (Mr. Hackett). Marian Seldes (Louise Grantham Robilotti), Kari Matchett (Celia Grantham), Conrad Dunn (Saul Panzer), Nicky Guadagni (Elaine Usher), Kathryn Zenna (Helen Yarmis), Alex Poch-Goldin (Edwin Laidlaw), Robert Bockstael (Paul Schuster), R. D. Reid (Sergeant Purley Stebbins), Christine Brubaker (Rose Tuttle), Steve Cumyn (Cecil Grantham), Boyd Banks (Austin "Dinky" Byne), David Schurmann (Robert Robilotti), Michael Rhoades (Beverly Kent), Janine Theriault (Ethel Varr) and Patricia Zentilli (Faith Usher).

Based on music by Dmitri Shostakovich, the episode's signature waltz is a 1991 recording by the Royal Concertgebouw Orchestra conducted by Riccardo Chailly. (Note: Dmitri Shostakovich and Levon Atovmyan, Suite for Variety Orchestra No. 1. London 433 702-2, Shostakovich: The Jazz Album (track 13). This recording lists the work as Jazz Suite No. 2, a common mistake that resulted from its being misidentified in 1984. The suite is based on music by Shostakovich, arranged by Atovmyan.) The soundtrack also includes music by Antonio Vivaldi, (Note: Antonio Vivaldi, Nulla in mundo pax sincera (excerpt), RV 630. Decca Records, Baroque Adagios (CD 1, track 19).) Danny Baker, (Note: Danny Baker, "Tom Tom Fever". OneMusic, Woody Jazz (track 1).) (Note: Danny Baker, "Benny the Badman". OneMusic, Woody Jazz (track 9).) Rick Krive (Note: Rick Krive, "Go Big Daddy". 5 Alarm Music, Swing (track 1).) Alan Moorhouse, (Note: Alan Moorhouse, "In the Swing". KPM Music, KPM 91, Music of the 20s, 30s and 40s (track 20).) and Luigi Boccherini. (Note: Luigi Boccherini, Minuet in A, from String Quintet in E Major, Op. 11, No. 5. KPM Music, KPM CS 7, Light Classics Volume One (track 2).) In North America, A Nero Wolfe Mystery was released on Region 1 DVD by A&E Home Video (ISBN 076708893X). "Champagne for One" is divided into two parts as originally broadcast on A&E. (Note: "Champagne for One" (disc 1), "Prisoner's Base" (disc 2) and "Over My Dead Body" (disc 3) are split into two parts as they originally aired on A&E. Three other telefilms originally shown as two-parters — "Motherhunt" (disc 5), "Too Many Clients" (disc 6) and "The Silent Speaker" (disc 7) — were issued by A&E Home Video as continuous films with a single set of titles and credits.)

"Champagne for One" is one of the Nero Wolfe episodes released on Region 4 DVD in Australia under license by FremantleMedia Enterprises. Nero Wolfe — Collection One (2008) presents "Champagne for One" as a 90-minute film with a single set of titles and credits. (Note: Nero Wolfe — Collection One, August 13, 2008 EAN 9316797427038. Three-disc set includes "The Golden Spiders", "The Doorbell Rang" and "Champagne for One". Each 90-minute film is presented with a single set of titles and credits. Screen format is 4:3 full frame. The set is rated M (mild crime themes and mild violence) by the Commonwealth of Australia; "Champagne for One" itself is rated PG.) In 2009 the film was released on Region 2 DVD in the Netherlands, by Just Entertainment. (Note: A Nero Wolfe Mystery — Serie 1 (EAN 8717344739221) was released December 11, 2009, by Just Entertainment, under license by FremantleMedia. The three-disc Region 2 set includes "The Golden Spiders", "The Doorbell Rang" and "Champagne for One". Each 90-minute film is presented with a single set of titles and credits. Screen format is 4:3 full frame; optional Dutch subtitles.) In October 2012 a region-free set of the complete series was released by independent Australian DVD distributor Shock Entertainment, which also made the series available through Australian iTunes. All of these DVD releases present "Champagne for One" in 4:3 pan and scan rather than its 16:9 aspect ratio for widescreen viewing.

=== Nero Wolfe (Radiotelevisione italiana S.p.A.) ===
Grazia Giardiello adapted Champagne for One for the second episode of the RAI TV series Nero Wolfe (Italy 2012), starring Francesco Pannofino as Nero Wolfe and Pietro Sermonti as Archie Goodwin. Set in 1959 in Rome, where Wolfe and Archie reside after leaving the United States, the series was produced by Casanova Multimedia and Rai Fiction and directed by Riccardo Donna. "Champagne per uno" made its debut April 12, 2012.

== Publication history ==
- 1958, New York: The Viking Press, November 24, 1958, hardcover

Bookseller and publisher Otto Penzler describes the first edition of Champagne for One: "Black cloth, front cover and spine printed with purple; rear cover blank. Issued in a mainly black dust wrapper." In April 2006, Firsts: The Book Collector's Magazine estimated that the first edition of Champagne for One had a value of between $200 and $350. The estimate is for a copy in very good to fine condition in a like dustjacket.

- 1958, London, Ontario: Macmillan, 1958
- 1959, New York: Viking (Mystery Guild), January 1959, hardcover (Note: The far less valuable Viking book club edition may be distinguished from the first edition in three ways: The dust jacket has "Book Club Edition" printed on the inside front flap, and the price is absent (first editions may be price clipped if they were given as gifts).; Book club editions are sometimes thinner and always taller (usually a quarter of an inch) than first editions.; Book club editions are bound in cardboard, and first editions are bound in cloth (or have at least a cloth spine).)
- 1959, London: Collins Crime Club, September 7, 1959, hardcover
- 1960, New York: Bantam #A2023, April 1960, paperback
- 1961, London: Fontana, 1961, paperback
- 1978, London: Penguin, 1978, paperback
- 1992, London: Scribners ISBN 0-356-20108-2, 1992, hardcover
- 1996, New York: Bantam Crimeline ISBN 0-553-24438-8, 1996, paperback, Rex Stout Library edition with introduction by Lena Horne
- 1998, Canada, Durkin Hayes Publishing, DH Audio ISBN 0-88646-456-0 January 1998, audio cassette (unabridged, read by Saul Rubinek)
- 2006, Auburn, California: The Audio Partners Publishing Corp., Mystery Masters ISBN 1-57270-520-5 March 28, 2006, audio CD (unabridged, read by Michael Prichard)
- 2009, New York: Bantam Dell Publishing Group (with Too Many Cooks) ISBN 978-0-553-38629-5 April 28, 2009, trade paperback
- 2010, New York: Bantam Crimeline ISBN 978-0-307-75576-6 July 21, 2010, e-book
