= Shock Entertainment =

Australian independent record label

Shock
- Parent company: Regency Media
- Founded: 1988
- Founder: David Williams; Frank Falvo; Andrew McGee
- Defunct: 2023
- Status: Inactive
- Genre: Alternative rock, rock, punk rock, folk, pop, electronic, blues
- Country of origin: Australia
- Location: Kew, Victoria

Shock Records was an Australian independent record label, branded with the logo Shock or Shock Australia. Founded in 1988, it traded as Shock Records Pty. Ltd, and its publishing arm as Shock Music Publishing Pty. Ltd. Its most prominent sublabel was Permanent Records. After going into receivership in August 2010, the company was acquired by Regency Media Group and rebranded as Shock Entertainment. Regency Media folded in February 2023.

== History ==
Shock Records was founded in 1988 by David Williams, Frank Falvo, and Andrew McGee.

The company was at its height in the 1990s, with many hits in the punk, grunge and alternative rock genres, including artists such as The Offspring, TISM, Satellite and Ricki-Lee Coulter.

In August 2010, the warehouse closed and label was sold. At that time still headed by Williams, some of the company were sold to CD duplicator, the Regency Media Group. Its distribution centre was moved to Regency's Sydney warehouse.

Craig May headed the company from around February 2013 until January 2014, when he relocated to the UK. Mick Tarbuk took the reins for nearly two years, until November 2015, when Luke Girgis was A&R/label director. However Girgis departed after only nine months, in July 2016. Sales manager Simon McLaughlin took over his role.

Regency Media entered voluntary administration in February 2023.

== See also ==
- List of record labels
