= Regency Media Group =

Former Australian media conglomerate

Coordinates: 37.803975°S 145.03862°E

- Industry: Distribution
- Founded: Mid-1950s
- Defunct: February 2023
- Headquarters: Australia
- Products: Films, DVD, music
- Divisions: Regency Home Entertainment

Regency Media Group was an Australian media conglomerate, active in the Australian entertainment industry since the mid-1950s. The corporation was latterly focused on the production of digital media, until its demise in February 2023.

As of 2008 Regency owned a 74% stake in a joint venture in India with Saregama to produce compact discs, video CDs, and DVDs for the Indian market.

In August 2010, Regency acquired some of the assets of Shock Records. In 2012 Shock DVD changed its name to Regency Home Entertainment, and had licensing and distribution deals with partners including WWE, CBS, E!, and Time–Life.

The company launched Regency Film Distribution in June 2012, headed by Ivan Vukusic, a former Shock employee.

Regency Media entered voluntary administration in February 2023.
