= Plot It Yourself =

1959 novel by Rex Stout

- Author: Rex Stout
- Cover artist: Bill English
- Language: English
- Series: Nero Wolfe
- Genre: Detective fiction
- Publisher: Viking Press
- Publication date: October 30, 1959
- Publication place: United States
- Media type: Print (Hardcover)
- Pages: 183 pp. (first edition)
- OCLC: 1389319
- Preceded by: Champagne for One
- Followed by: Three at Wolfe's Door

Plot It Yourself (British title Murder in Style) is a Nero Wolfe detective novel by Rex Stout, published by the Viking Press in 1959, and also collected in the omnibus volume Kings Full of Aces (Viking 1969).

== Plot introduction ==
I stopped because he was having a fit. He had closed his right hand to make a fist and was hitting the desk with it, and he was bellowing. He was roaring something in a language that was probably the one he had used as a boy in Montenegro, the one that he and Marko Vukcic had sometimes talked.
Fritz, entering with beer, stopped and looked at me reproachfully. Wolfe quit bellowing as abruptly as he had started, glared at Fritz, and said coldly, "Take that back. I don't want it."
"But it will do – "
"Take it back. I shall drink no beer until I get my fingers around that creature's throat."

— Nero Wolfe on learning of yet another murder, in Plot It Yourself, chapter 13.

A group of authors and publishers hires Nero Wolfe to investigate a series of plagiarism claims. Wolfe, by his own admission, bungles the investigation so badly that three murders result.

In Plot It Yourself, Stout draws on his lengthy experience with book publishers, with authors (via, for example, his presidency of the Authors Guild), and with the writing process itself. Apart from the series' continuing characters, all the players in the book are directly associated with the publishing industry. Stout adds as subtext his take on the peculiar relationship between book authors and book publishers — part symbiosis, part animosity. Stout himself experienced at least one instance of contentious relations with his publishers.

== Plot summary ==
Someone has been getting away with a different spin on plagiarism. It's the old scam – an unsuccessful author stealing ideas from an established source – but it's being worked differently. Now, the plagiarists are claiming that the well-known authors are stealing from them (as Wolfe puts it, "plagiarism upside down."). And they are making their claims stick: three successful claims in four years, one awaiting trial, and one that's just been made.

These claims have damaged both the publishers and the authors. The Book Publishers of America (BPA) and the National Association of Authors and Dramatists (NAAD) form a joint committee to explore ways to stop the fraud, and the committee comes to Wolfe for help. The first four claims have shared certain characteristics: in the first, for example, the best selling author Ellen Sturdevant is accused by the virtually unknown Alice Porter of stealing a recent book's plot from a story that Porter sent her, asking her suggestions for improvement. Sturdevant ignores the accusation until Porter's manuscript is found in Sturdevant's house. The writing and publishing industry is convinced that the manuscript was planted, but the case was settled out of court.

That scenario, with minor variations, is repeated four times, with other authors and by other plagiarists. The latest complaint has been made only recently, by an author who has had her first success, and the target of the complaint wonders when a manuscript will show up in a place where it was not present the day before. The committee advises her to have her home checked by others to verify that no such short manuscript is in her home. Two on Wolfe's staff do this task.

Wolfe's first step is to acquire and read the manuscripts that form the basis for the complaints. Wolfe's love of literature turns out to be useful in his investigation: from the internal evidence in the manuscripts, Wolfe concludes that they were all written by the same person. Aspects such as diction, punctuation and syntax – and, most convincingly, paragraphing – point Wolfe directly to the conclusion that one person wrote all the manuscripts.

At first, this seems like progress, but then it becomes clear that it is the opposite. The task initially seemed to be to show that the first fraud inspired a sequence of copycats, and the universe of suspects was limited to the complainants. But now that Wolfe has determined that one person wrote all the fraudulent manuscripts, that one person could be anyone. Wolfe meets with the joint committee to discuss the situation. Further, the short manuscript is planted at the office of the publisher for the newest author, which enrages the publisher.

A committee member suggests that one of the plagiarists be offered money, along with a guarantee of immunity, to identify the manuscripts' actual author. The committee concurs, and asks Wolfe to arrange for the offer to be made to Simon Jacobs. The next day, Archie goes to make the offer to Jacobs, but finds Sergeant Purley Stebbins at the Jacobs apartment: Mr. Jacobs has been murdered, stabbed to death the night before.

In short order, Archie discovers two more dead plagiarists. Wolfe blames himself for not taking steps to protect Jacobs and the others, who had been made targets by the plan to pay for information. The only one left is Alice Porter, who first worked the fraud successfully, and who is now repeating it with Amy Wynn and her publisher. Wolfe, concentrating on Porter, catches her in a contradiction that identifies the murderer for him. Wolfe reveals to the committee that the newly successful author was both plagiarist and murderer, after his field staff confirms that Wynn had met with each of the three victims in person.

== Cast of characters ==
- Nero Wolfe — The private investigator
- Archie Goodwin — Wolfe's assistant (and the narrator of all Wolfe stories)
- Philip Harvey and Amy Wynn (authors), Mortimer Oshin (dramatist) — Representing the NAAD
- Gerald Knapp, Reuben Imhoff and Thomas Dexter — Representing the BPA
- Cora Ballard — Executive secretary for the NAAD
- Alice Porter, Simon Jacobs, Jane Ogilvy and Kenneth Rennert — Plagiarists all
- Amy Wynn — Newly successful author and the one most recently accused of plagiarizing
- Inspector Cramer and Sergeant Purley Stebbins — Representing Manhattan Homicide

== Reviews and commentary ==
- Jacques Barzun and Wendell Hertig Taylor, A Catalogue of Crime — A plagiarism racket brings Nero and Archie into conflict with each other and with crime. Excellent repartee on all hands and strong suspense. The murderer's confession alone is below the surrounding perfection.
- Anthony Boucher, The New York Times Book Review (November 8, 1959) — Rex Stout has been a member, an officer and a guiding spirit of many an organization of professional writers, and his lively knowledge of such organizations brightens Plot It Yourself, in which Nero Wolfe's client is the Joint Committee on Plagiarism of the National Association of Authors and Dramatists and the Book Publishers of America. An adroit scheme for bringing fraudulent chargers of plagiarism leads into murder and to an error by Wolfe which so enrages him that he vows to drink no beer and eat no meat until he solves the case — which he does promptly and satisfactorily in one of his better book-length adventures.
- Kirkus Reviews (September 1, 1959) — An ingenious story — as successive charges of plagiarism are brought against writers and publishing houses, and confirmatory evidence presented which seems to make it something more than blackmail.
- L. G. Offord, The San Francisco Chronicle (December 13, 1959) — For writers or anyone who wants to know what goes on in the literary world, this is wonderful stuff ... There's a good surprise finish and a masterly last scene.
- Nancy Pearl, Book Lust — When Stout is on top of his game, which is most of the time, his diabolically clever plotting and his storytelling ability exceed that of any other mystery writer you can name, including Agatha Christie, who invented her own eccentric genius detective Hercule Poirot. Although in the years since Stout's death I find myself going back and rereading his entire oeuvre every year or two, I return with particular pleasure to these five novels: The Doorbell Rang; Plot It Yourself; Murder by the Book; Champagne for One; and Gambit.
- Saturday Review of Literature (January 23, 1960) — Mass plagiarism charges send New York publishers and authors (lions and lambs) to Nero Wolfe for help; triple-murder sequence also puts damper on belles-lettres. Usual pro performance, with Archie Goodwin never so flip.
- Terry Teachout, "Forty years with Nero Wolfe" (January 12, 2009) — Rex Stout's witty, fast-moving prose hasn't dated a day, while Wolfe himself is one of the enduringly great eccentrics of popular fiction. I've spent the past four decades reading and re-reading Stout's novels for pleasure, and they have yet to lose their savor ... It is to revel in such writing that I return time and again to Stout's books, and in particular to The League of Frightened Men, Some Buried Caesar, The Silent Speaker, Too Many Women, Murder by the Book, Before Midnight, Plot It Yourself, Too Many Clients, The Doorbell Rang, and Death of a Doxy, which are for me the best of all the full-length Wolfe novels.

== Publication history ==
- 1959, New York: The Viking Press, October 30, 1959, hardcover

In his limited-edition pamphlet, Collecting Mystery Fiction #10, Rex Stout's Nero Wolfe Part II, Otto Penzler describes the first edition of Plot It Yourself: "Blue-green cloth, front cover and spine printed with red; rear cover blank. Issued in a mainly red pictorial dust wrapper."
In April 2006, Firsts: The Book Collector's Magazine estimated that the first edition of Plot It Yourself had a value of between $200 and $350. The estimate is for a copy in very good to fine condition in a like dustjacket.

- 1960, New York: Viking (Mystery Guild), February 1960, hardcover

The far less valuable Viking book club edition may be distinguished from the first edition in three ways:

- The dust jacket has "Book Club Edition" printed on the inside front flap, and the price is absent (first editions may be price clipped if they were given as gifts).
- Book club editions are sometimes thinner and always taller (usually a quarter of an inch) than first editions.
- Book club editions are bound in cardboard, and first editions are bound in cloth (or have at least a cloth spine).

- 1960, London: Collins Crime Club, August 4, 1960, hardcover (as Murder in Style)
- 1960, New York: Bantam #A2156, December 1960, paperback
- 1969, New York: The Viking Press, Kings Full of Aces: A Nero Wolfe Omnibus (with Too Many Cooks and Triple Jeopardy), January 28, 1969, hardcover
- 1968, New York: Bantam #F3582, Edition: December 1960; 2nd Printing January 1968, paperback, .50¢
- 1986, New York: Bantam Books ISBN 0-553-25363-8, 1986, paperback
- 1989, New York: Bantam Books ISBN 0-553-27849-5 April 1989, paperback
- 1993, London: Little, Brown and Company (UK) Ltd., ISBN 0-316-90459-7, 1993, hardcover (as Murder in Style)
- 1994, New York: Bantam Crimeline ISBN 0-553-25363-8 July 1994, paperback, Rex Stout Library edition with introduction by Susan Dunlap
- 2007, New Kingstown, RI: BBC Audiobooks America, Mystery Masters ISBN 1-60283-490-3 November 11, 2008 [1996], CD (unabridged, read by Michael Prichard)
- 2011, New York: Bantam Crimeline ISBN 978-0-307-76818-6 August 17, 2011, e-book
