= Mario Righetti =

Italian painter

Mario Righetti (born c. 1590) was an Italian painter of the Baroque period.

He was born in Bologna. He became a pupil of Lucio Massari. In Bologna, he painted an Archangel Michael for the church of San Guglielmo; a Christ appearing to the Magdalen for San Giacomo Maggiore; an Adoration of the Magi for the church of Sant'Agnese; and a Nativity that once adorned the church of Santa Lucia (now deconsecrated).
