= Too Many Cooks (novel) =

1938 novel by Rex Stout

- Author: Rex Stout
- Language: English
- Series: Nero Wolfe
- Genre: Detective fiction
- Publisher: Farrar & Rinehart
- Publication date: August 17, 1938
- Publication place: United States
- Media type: Print (hardcover)
- Pages: 303 pp. (first edition)
- OCLC: 3103529
- Preceded by: The Red Box
- Followed by: Some Buried Caesar

Too Many Cooks is the fifth Nero Wolfe detective novel by American mystery writer Rex Stout. The story was serialized in The American Magazine (March–August 1938) before its publication in book form in 1938 by Farrar & Rinehart, Inc. The novel was collected in the omnibus volume Kings Full of Aces, published in 1969 by the Viking Press.

== Plot introduction ==
"It is not decent to induce the cocaine habit in a man, but it is monstrous to do so and then suddenly withdraw his supply of the drug. Nature plainly intends that a man should nourish a woman, and a woman a man, physically and spiritually, but there is no nourishment in you for anybody; the vapor that comes from you, from your eyes, your lips, your soft skin, your contours, your movements, is not beneficent but malignant."

— Nero Wolfe, articulating a specific animus toward Marko's ex-wife, in Too Many Cooks, chapter 9

Wolfe, a knowledgeable gourmet as well as a detective, attends a meeting of great chefs, Les Quinze Maîtres, at a resort in West Virginia, and jealousies among them soon lead to strife; then, one of the chefs is murdered. Wolfe sustains his own injury in the course of finding the culprit but also obtains the secret recipe for saucisse minuit.

== Plot summary ==
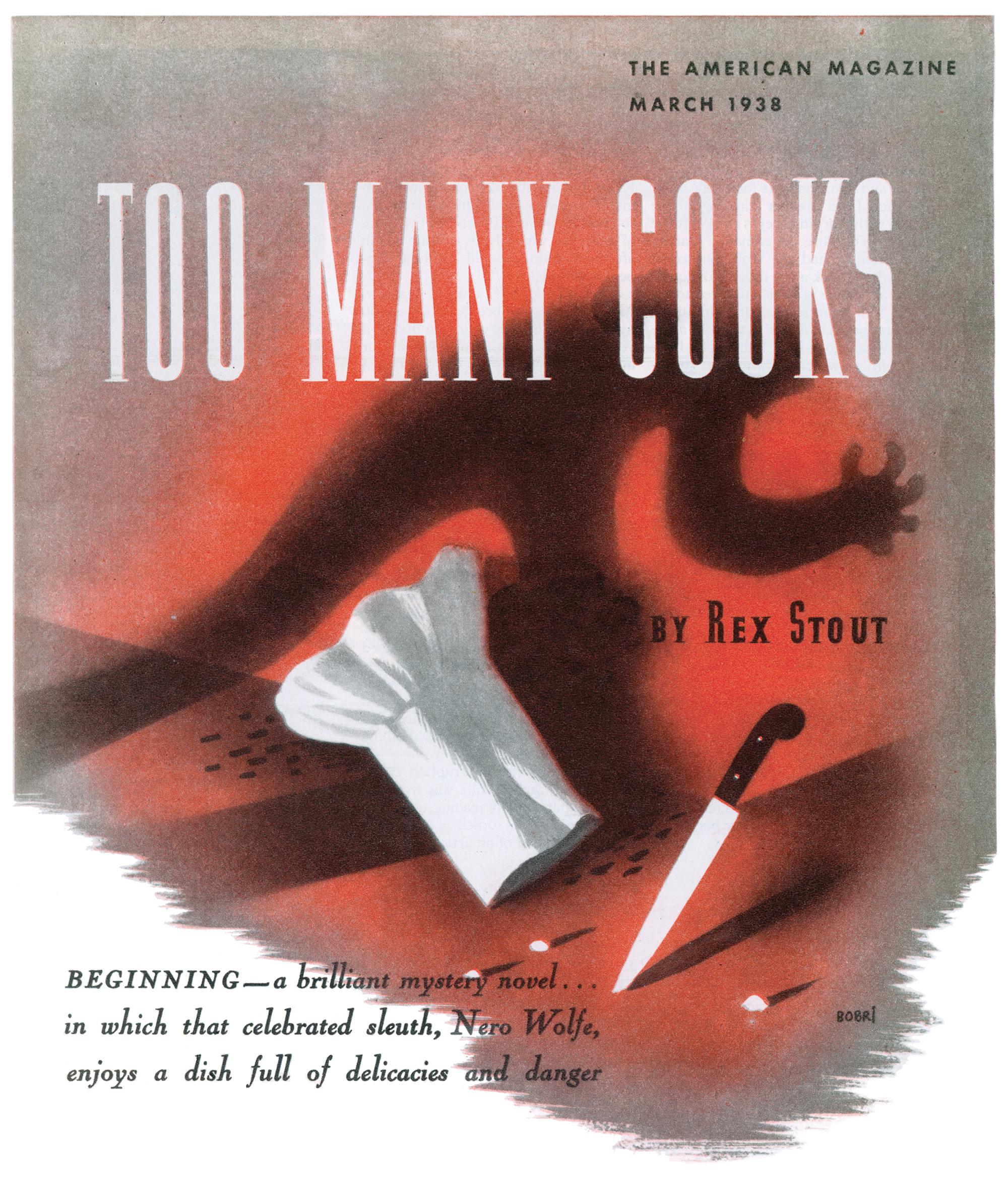
Vladimir Bobri created the title illustration for Too Many Cooks, serialized in six issues of The American Magazine beginning in March 1938 (Note: The title page of the series in The American Magazine was also used as a pictorial wrapper for a boxed set of recipes for the dishes mentioned in Too Many Cooks. Readers were invited to write Nero Wolfe at the magazine and enclose a three-cent stamp (p. 137). Of the 35 recipes in the story, 12 were created by Rex Stout, "who, like his famous Nero, always has a culinary idea brewing," the magazine reported (p. 82).)

Nero Wolfe accepts an invitation to address Les Quinze Maîtres ("The Fifteen Masters"), an international group of master chefs, on the subject of American contributions to fine cuisine. The group is meeting at the Kanawha Spa resort in West Virginia (possibly based on the famous actual resort The Greenbrier).) To attend, Wolfe must suppress his loathing of travel and trains on the 14-hour train ride from New York City. As a courtesy to Wolfe, Archie has been invited to the gathering by Marko Vukcic, Wolfe's oldest friend and one of Les Quinze Maîtres, so that he can accompany Wolfe.

During the trip, Vukcic introduces Wolfe to Jerome Berin, another member of Les Quinze Maîtres and the originator of saucisse minuit. Wolfe tasted the sausage once and has coveted Berin's closely guarded recipe for years. Berin is flattered, but he scorns Wolfe's offer of $3,000 for the private use of the recipe. In the course of this discussion, Berin angrily denounces Philip Laszio, another Maître, who serves an inferior substitute for saucisse minuit in his restaurant. Laszio also stole Vukcic's ex-wife Dina from him and the position of Head Chef at New York's Hotel Churchill from Leon Blanc, another Maître. His passion inflamed, Berin threatens to kill Laszio.

The next night, at a welcoming dinner for Les Quinze Maîtres, Philip Laszio insults the host, Louis Servan, another Maître, and his head chef when he criticises the cooking. Tensions are further increased when Blanc refuses to tolerate Laszio's company and Vukcic begins to succumb to the charms of Dina, who appears to be seducing him. After the dinner, a tasting test is held, based on a challenge made to Laszio. Laszio prepares nine numbered dishes of Sauce Printemps, with each dish missing a different vital ingredient. The other nine Maîtres present, and Wolfe, are challenged to taste each dish and write down which dish is missing which ingredient. Blanc, of course, does not participate in the tasting.

Wolfe is the last contestant to taste the dishes, but halfway through, he summons Archie into the private dining room where the tasting is taking place; Philip Laszio has been murdered, stabbed in the back and hidden behind a room divider. The authorities are called, led by Barry Tolman, a local prosecutor who happened to arrive on the train with Wolfe and Goodwin. At Wolfe's suggestion, Tolman examines the results of the taste testing on the theory that the murderer, either tense before committing murder or shaken afterwards, would be unable to determine accurately the missing ingredients. Jerome Berin has the lowest score and, based on Wolfe's theory, is subsequently charged with murder. This drives a wedge between Tolman and Constanza Berin, Jerome's daughter, who have been developing a romantic attachment.

The next morning, Wolfe receives a visit from Laszio's employer at the Churchill, Raymond Liggett, and Laszio's assistant Alberto Malfi; they want Wolfe's help in securing a replacement for Laszio at the Churchill. Although Wolfe is scornful of Liggett's request and refuses his employment, when Berin is arrested, he is skeptical that Berin could be the murderer. Seeing an opportunity to get the master chef into his debt, Wolfe decides to investigate Laszio's murder and exonerate Berin. Wolfe learns from Lio Coyne, the wife of one of the guests, that she saw two men in waiter's uniforms in the dining room around the time of the murder, with one of them hushing another.

Consequently, Wolfe gathers together the African-American kitchen and serving staff and questions them. In contrast to the racist and abusive attitudes of the local authorities, Wolfe is courteous, respectful, and civil to the men, but they are nevertheless skeptical and uncooperative until he appeals to their sense of equity and justice. He argues that if they shield the murderer solely because of his skin colour then they are “rendering your race a serious disservice” and are “helping to perpetuate and aggravate the very exclusions which you justly resent." Impressed by the speech, Paul Whipple, a waiter and college student, admits that he was one of the men in the dining room that night. But the other man was not African-American; he was wearing blackface. It is also revealed that Laszio himself had switched around the sauce dishes before Berin's turn to humiliate him; this explains Berin's low score.

This information is sufficient to get Berin released from custody. Having accomplished his objective — to put Berin in his debt – Wolfe turns his attention to the speech he is to give. While rehearsing the speech in his room, however, Wolfe is shot through an open window. Wolfe is only grazed by the bullet but is enraged and returns his attention to Laszio's murder: clearly, the same person who killed Laszio tried to kill Wolfe, and Wolfe intends to deliver the murderer to Tolman. He initiates further inquiries, carried out mainly by Saul Panzer and Inspector Cramer in New York, and later presides over a dinner for the remaining members of Les Quinze Maîtres, composed exclusively of American cuisine. The Maîtres are very impressed by the quality of the dinner, and Wolfe has the chefs responsible brought to the room to be applauded by the diners — all are black men.

After the meal and despite the handicap of the facial wound, Wolfe delivers his speech on American cuisine, and — to the surprise of the gathered masters — continues by delivering the evidence that will convict Laszio's murderer and Wolfe's assailant. He reveals that the murderer was Raymond Liggett, who secretly flew into West Virginia the night of the murder, disguised himself as one of the wait staff, and murdered Laszio. He attempted to hire Wolfe to cover his tracks and to bribe Wolfe subtly not to interfere. When Wolfe secured Berin's release, he panicked and shot him. Liggett was aided by Dina Laszio, whom he coveted; she betrays him and confesses her part in order to prevent arrest.

The same night, Wolfe and Archie depart for New York, once again on the same train as Berin, Constanza, and Tolman. While Archie helps Constanza and Tolman mend their fractured relationship, Wolfe reminds Berin that Berin is in his debt, demanding the recipe for saucisse minuit as payment. Berin is outraged, but is eventually shamed into providing the recipe.

The first Nero Wolfe story issued as a Dell mapback (Dell #45, 1944), Too Many Cooks featured a scene-of-the-crime map by Gerald Gregg

== The unfamiliar word ==
"Nero Wolfe talks in a way that no human being on the face of the earth has ever spoken, with the possible exception of Rex Stout after he had a gin and tonic," said Michael Jaffe, executive producer of the A&E TV series, A Nero Wolfe Mystery. Nero Wolfe's erudite vocabulary is one of the hallmarks of the character. Examples of unfamiliar words — or unfamiliar uses of words that some would otherwise consider familiar — are found throughout the corpus, often in the give-and-take between Wolfe and Archie. These examples occur in Too Many Cooks:

- Surprise. Chapter 1. Highly unusual in the context, but allowed by the Random House Dictionary.
- Coquine. Chapter 2.
- Sinuosities. Chapter 4.
- Werowance. Chapter 5.
- Gyves. Chapter 5.
- Gibbosity. Chapter 13.

== The American Magazine and the Cooks tour ==
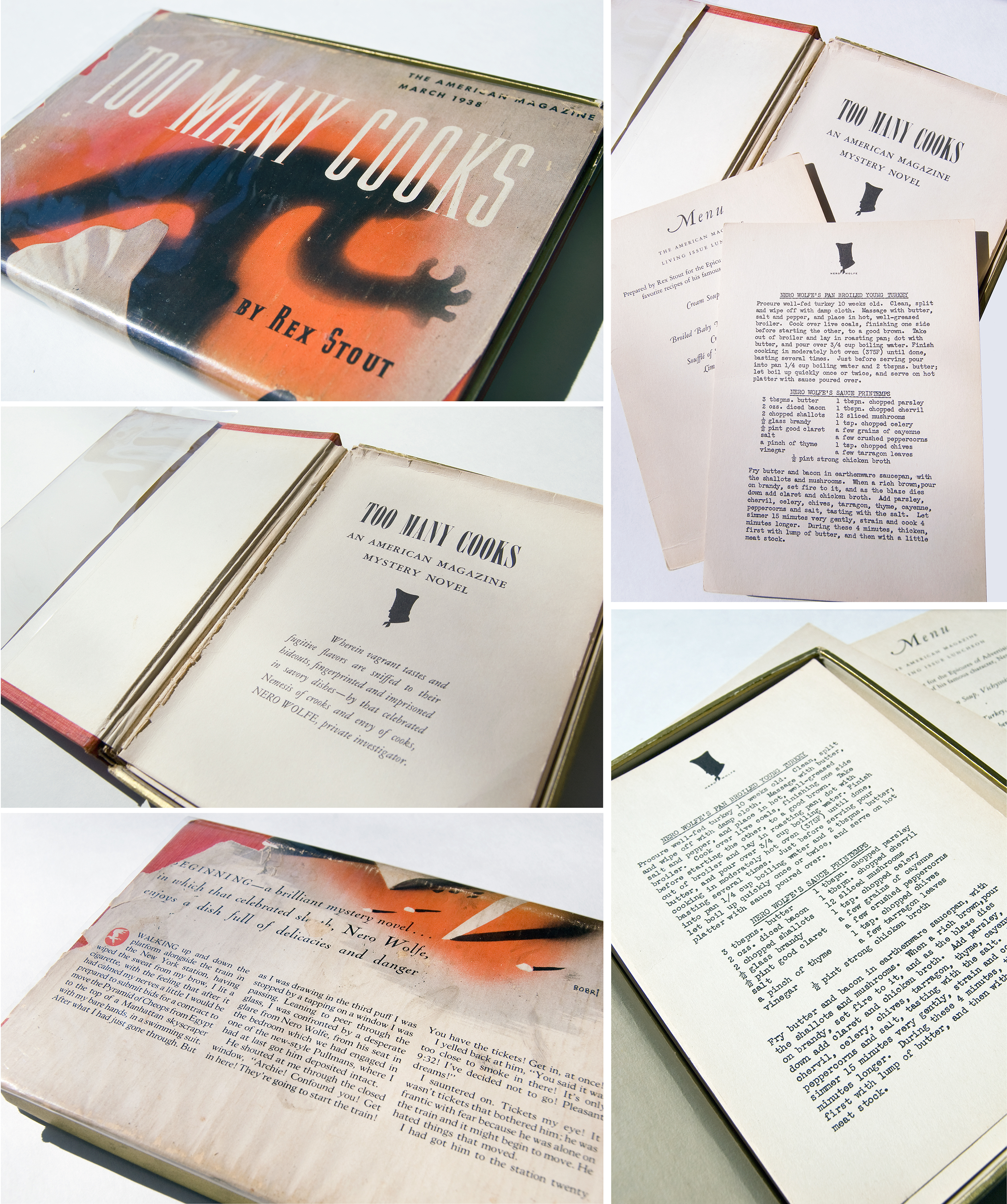
Designed to look like a book, a boxed set of recipes was created by The American Magazine to promote the March 1938 debut of Too Many Cooks.

To coincide with the serialization of Too Many Cooks in 1938, The American Magazine sent Rex Stout on a national tour, described by Stout's biographer John McAleer:

The American's spring tour was perhaps the most famous promotional show in publishing history. It was indeed a travelling road show, comprised of actors, actresses, and models as well as well-known writers or subjects of articles which had appeared in the magazine. The cast was transported in a chartered Pullman; there was a baggage car for the scenery, and a revolving stage — the first of its kind. The show was scripted by Borden Chase, the Hollywood writer and novelist.

Together with golf star Gene Sarazen, Stout visited a dozen U.S. cities: Boston, New York, Philadelphia, Atlanta, Cleveland, Akron, Cincinnati, Louisville, Detroit, Chicago, Minneapolis and St. Louis. An editorial luncheon was given in each of the cities, with the menu made up from Too Many Cooks. As a keepsake for guests, The American Magazine created a small red box in the shape of a book, containing the menu of the "Living Issue Luncheon," a statement by Nero Wolfe, and the 35 recipes that appear in Too Many Cooks. The recipe box was wrapped with a reproduction of the title page from the story's March 1938 debut. Made up in a limited edition of 1,000 copies, the recipe box is described by McAleer as "one of the most sought-after items of Stoutiana."

In April 2018, partial sets of the recipes were distributed to diners at a reenactment of one of the meals described in Too Many Cooks—the "American Dinner". The Wolfe Pack event took place at The Greenbrier in White Sulphur Springs, West Virginia.

== Reviews and commentary ==
- Jacques Barzun and Wendell Hertig Taylor, A Catalogue of Crime — The masterpiece among three or four by Stout that deserve the name. In addition, it is the most amusing, thanks to such incidents as Nero's being shot in yellow pajamas, the altercation over saucisse minuit, and the triangle of Archie, the young lawyer, and the beautiful girl.
- Agatha Christie — I have enjoyed a great many of his books. Archie is a splendid character to have invented and his first person remarks and descriptions are always most entertaining to read. I must also reveal that greed and the general enjoyment of food is one of my main characteristics and the descriptions of the meals served and prepared by Nero Wolfe's cook have given me a lot of pleasure and a great wish to have occasionally tasted these suggestions myself. Perhaps for that reason, I particularly liked Too Many Cooks.
- Nora Ephron — Best meal in English literature? The banquet in Too Many Cooks by Rex Stout.
- Clifton Fadiman, The New Yorker — Nero Wolfe, bigger and better than ever, is a guest of Les Quinze Maîtres, a society of world famous chefs, at a West Virginia spa. As murder is Mr. Wolfe's business, the polite chefs oblige. By far the best and funniest of Mr. Stout's books.
- M.F.K. Fisher — I think I have read everything Mr. Stout has written about Wolfe and Goodwin, and I have a standing offer for second-hand copies of Too Many Cooks; it is more comfortable to give them to people than to know who has stolen mine, which happened three times before I learned that trick.
- Marcia Kiser, Nero Wolfe: A Social Commentary on the U.S. — Referring to Wolfe's speech to the staff at the spa, "… the ideal human agreement is one in which distinctions of race and color and religion are totally disregarded." Please note Wolfe does not include "sex" in his list.
- John McAleer, Rex Stout: A Biography — Too Many Cooks is one of the finest Wolfe stories. It is the closest thing to a locked-room mystery that Rex wrote. Accounting for his failure to work in this area, Rex said: "Since the interest is focused on one spot, Nero Wolfe would have to go there, and he wouldn't like that."
- Time (August 29, 1938) — Of last month's 13 mysteries, five stood out as best bets: Too Many Cooks — Rex Stout — Farrar & Rinehart ($2). Smooth concoction of crime and cooking in which Nero Wolfe, assisted by faithful, wisecracking Archie Goodwin, solves the murder of one of the world's 15 best chefs.
- J. Kenneth Van Dover, At Wolfe's Door — The occasion of Wolfe's brief foray beyond the walls of his brownstone produces an unusual variety of characters and a very unusual non-urban setting. It also results in the fullest portrait of his gastronomical interests. The chefs are all temperamental artists, and there is much incidental discussion of the fine points of gourmet cooking. Wolfe delivers a formal address on the supremacy of American cuisine. Race relations become an issue. Archie, prosecutor Tolman, and Sheriff Pettigrew casually employ denigrative epithets ... Wolfe condescends to the black service staff no more than he does to anyone else, and he even surprises one of the waiters, Paul Whipple, by citing a line from Paul Laurence Dunbar. Tolman and Pettigrew protest Wolfe's misguided decency. ...

== Adaptations ==
=== Zu viele Köche (NWRV) ===
The North and West German Broadcasting Association adapted Too Many Cooks for a black-and-white miniseries that first aired February 27, 1961. Heinz Klevenow starred as Nero Wolfe, and Joachim Fuchsberger portrayed Archie Goodwin. After Rex Stout protested that his story was used without permission, he received a $3,500 settlement.

=== Salsicce 'Mezzanotte (Radiotelevisione Italiana) ===
Too Many Cooks was adapted for one of a series of Nero Wolfe films produced by the Italian television network RAI (Radiotelevisione Italiana). Directed by Giuliana Berlinguer from a teleplay by Belisario L. Randone, Nero Wolfe: Salsicce 'Mezzanotte' first aired February 23, 1971.

The series of black-and-white telemovies stars Tino Buazzelli (Nero Wolfe), Paolo Ferrari (Archie Goodwin), Pupo De Luca (Fritz Brenner), Renzo Palmer (Inspector Cramer), Roberto Pistone (Saul Panzer), Mario Righetti (Orrie Cather) and Gianfranco Varetto (Fred Durkin). Other members of the cast of Salsicce 'Mezzanotte' include Corrado Annicelli (Servan), Carlo Bagno (Berin), Gianni Galavotti (Liggett), Loris Gizzi (Blanc), Evelina Gori (La signora Mondor), Guido Lazzarini (Mondor), Tana Li (Lio Coyne), Walter Maestosi (Vukcic), Giuseppe Mancini (Laszio), Enrico Osterman (Coyne), Luciana Scalise (Constance Berin), Paolo Todisco (Procuratore Tolman) and Halina Zalewska (Dina Laszio).

== Publication history ==
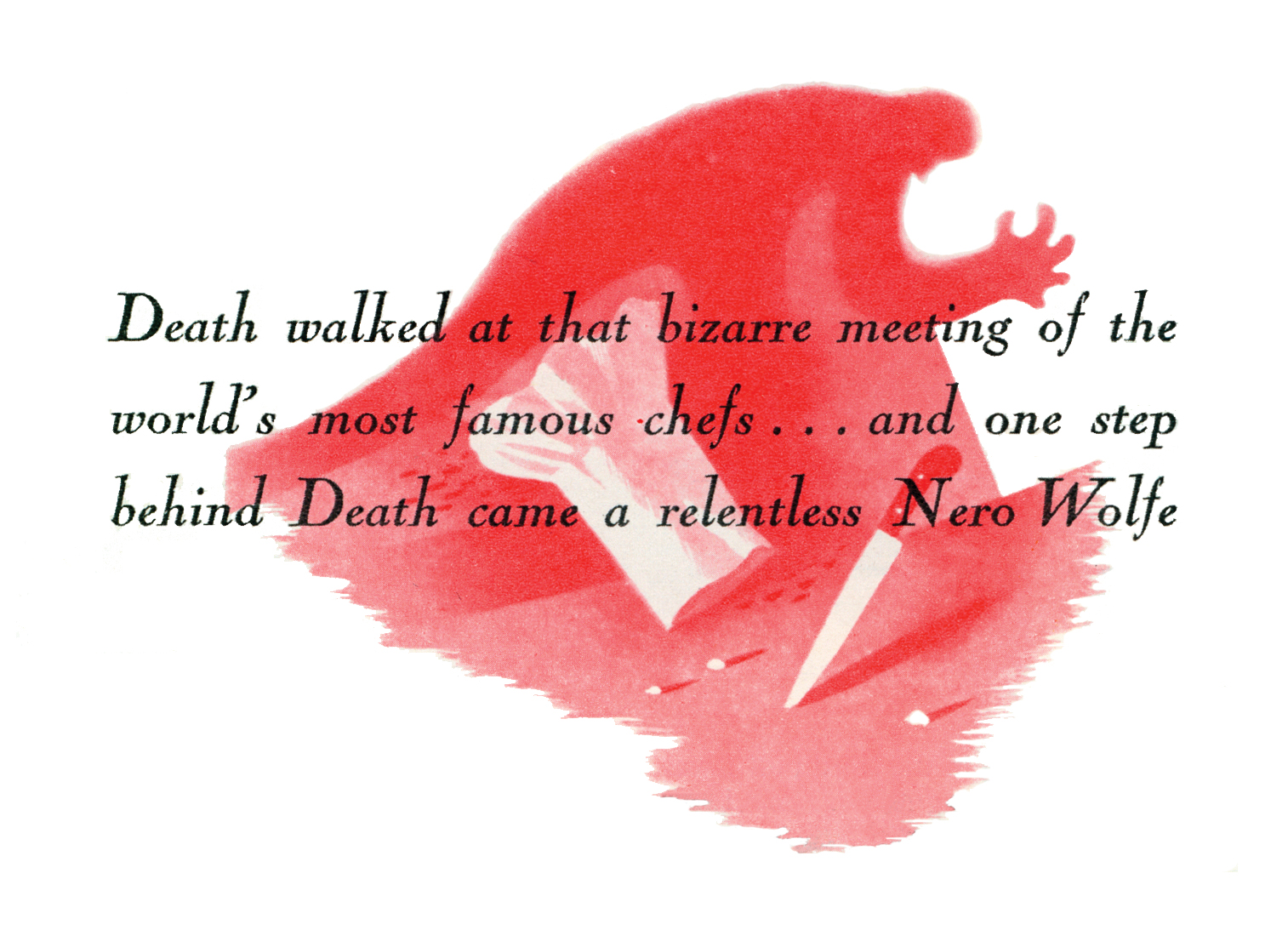

- 1938, The American Magazine, serialized in six issues (March–August 1938)
- 1938, New York: Farrar & Rinehart, August 17, 1938, hardcover

In his limited-edition pamphlet, Collecting Mystery Fiction #9, Rex Stout's Nero Wolfe Part I, Otto Penzler describes the first edition of Too Many Cooks: "Red cloth, front cover and spine printed with black; rear cover blank. Issued in a full-color pictorial dust wrapper … The first edition has the publisher's monogram logo on the copyright page. The second printing, in October 1938, is identical to the first except that the logo was dropped."
In April 2006, Firsts: The Book Collector's Magazine estimated that the first edition of Too Many Cooks had a value of between $2,500 and $5,000.

- 1938, Toronto: Oxford University Press, 1938, hardcover
- 1939, London: Collins Crime Club, September 12, 1938, hardcover
- 1940, New York: Grosset and Dunlap 1940, hardcover
- 1941, New York: Triangle #180, June 1941, hardcover
- 1941, Philadelphia: Blakiston, 1941, hardcover
- 1943, *New York: Lawrence E. Spivak, Jonathan Press #J-2, not dated, abridged, digest paperback
- 1944, New York: Dell (mapback by Gerald Gregg) #45, 1944, paperback
- 1951, New York: Dell (mapback by Robert Stanley) #540, 1951, paperback
- 1951, London: Pan, 1951, paperback
- 1963, New York: Pyramid (Green Door) #R-894, August 1963, paperback with second and third printings in the same format in June 1966 and May 1968 respectively.
- 1969, New York: The Viking Press, Kings Full of Aces: A Nero Wolfe Omnibus (with Plot It Yourself and Triple Jeopardy), January 28, 1969, hardcover
- 1972, London: Fontana, 1972, paperback
- 1973, London: Tom Stacey, 1973, hardcover
- 1976, New York: Garland, Fifty Classics of Crime Fiction 1900–1950, #45, 1976, hardcover
- 1979, New York: Jove #M4866, February 1979, paperback
- 1995, New York: Bantam Books ISBN 0-553-76306-7 November 1995, trade paperback
- 2004, Auburn, California: The Audio Partners Publishing Corp., Mystery Masters ISBN 1-57270-392-X May 2004, audio CD (unabridged, read by Michael Prichard)
- 2009, New York: Bantam Dell Publishing Group (with Champagne for One) ISBN 978-0-553-38629-5 April 28, 2009, trade paperback
- 2010, New York: Bantam ISBN 978-0-307-75627-5 July 21, 2010, e-book
