= Book Lust =

- Author: Nancy Pearl
- Publisher: Sas Books
- Publication date: 2003

Book Lust: Recommended Reading for Every Mood, Moment, and Reason was written by Nancy Pearl, former executive director of the Washington Center for the Book and inspiration for the Librarian action figure.

It was published in 2003 by Sasquatch Books and during its first year of publication it went into its fourth printing with over 90,000 copies.

== Impact ==
Will Manley, in an American Libraries article, wrote of Pearl's book, "Just when I was ready to put the last nail in the coffin of reader's advisory services, up pops the best book ever written on the subject." With books sorted by topics ranging from action heroines to cat crazy and graphic novels to political fiction and author spotlights such as Jonathan Lethem: Too Good to Miss, Book Lust serves as a reader's advisory tool for public librarians. The 304-page book organizes topics alphabetically and explores topics in narrative form.
