= The Father Hunt =

1968 novel by Rex Stout

- Author: Rex Stout
- Cover artist: Mel Williamson
- Language: English
- Series: Nero Wolfe
- Genre: Detective fiction
- Publisher: Viking Press
- Publication date: May 28, 1968
- Publication place: United States
- Media type: Print (Hardcover)
- Pages: 184 (first edition)
- OCLC: 442053
- Preceded by: Death of a Doxy
- Followed by: Death of a Dude

The Father Hunt is a Nero Wolfe detective novel by Rex Stout, published by the Viking Press in 1968. "This is the first Nero Wolfe novel in nearly two years," the front flap of the dust jacket reads, "an unusual interval for the productive Rex Stout, who celebrated his eightieth birthday in December 1966."

== Plot introduction ==
"Then we're left with nothing."
"We have Saul and Fred and Orrie. And me. And, oh yes, excuse me, we have you."
He looked at his current book, always there on the desk, picked it up, dropped it, and glared at me.

— Nero Wolfe at an impasse in The Father Hunt, chapter 9

Amy Denovo, a young woman assisting Lily Rowan, hires Nero Wolfe because she must find out who her father is, or was. After her mother was killed in a recent hit-and-run, Amy received a locked metal box containing more than a quarter of a million dollars in cash—and a letter from her mother that explained only that the money came from her father. The mystery of Amy's mother's identity rivals that of her father's.

== Plot summary ==
Lily Rowan has employed Amy Denovo, a recent Smith graduate, to assist her in collecting material about her father for a book. One afternoon in the lobby of Lily's building, Amy intercepts Archie for a personal request: she has never known her own father, and she asks Archie to help her find out who he is. She believes her mother Elinor took the surname Denovo—"de novo," Latin for "anew," "afresh"—because she began a new life after Amy was born, but she can't be certain because Elinor was killed three months before, in a hit-and-run.

Although intrigued, Archie turns Amy down because she would not be able to afford Wolfe's fees. However, the next afternoon, Amy arrives at the brownstone with $20,000 in hundred-dollar bills as a retainer. She says that her mother's death has brought to light the fact that Elinor Denovo had received $1,000 a month since Amy was born, a total of $264,000, and that this money is from Amy's father. Once Archie confirms that the letter is authentic, he and Wolfe accept Amy as a client in good standing.

Illustrated by Lou Feck, an abridged version of The Father Hunt appeared in Argosy magazine (November 1968)

Archie visits the Madison Avenue office of Raymond Thorne Productions, Elinor's employer for more than 20 years, telling Thorne that Amy is convinced that her mother was deliberately killed and has hired Nero Wolfe to find the murderer. Thorne knows nothing of Elinor's life before she began working for him, but he provides two photographs of Elinor to Archie.

Archie traces the checks Elinor received every month to the Seaboard Bank and Trust Company. Wolfe imposes upon the good will of Avery Ballou, who had paid Wolfe well for rescuing him from a predicament a year and a half before and who is on Seaboard's board of directors. Ballou soon tells him that the checks were drawn by Cyrus M. Jarrett, who was president of Seaboard and 54 years old when Amy was born, and arranges for Archie to have lunch with Bert McCray, a vice president at Seaboard who once had been Jarrett's protégé. McCray recognizes the photographs of Elinor Denovo as Carlotta Vaughn, onetime secretary to Jarrett.

Wolfe sends Orrie Cather to Washington, D.C., to check on Jarrett and sends Saul Panzer and Fred Durkin to turn up information on Carlotta Vaughn, while Archie follows two promising leads that end in humiliation. Wolfe drafts a display ad to run in all of the New York papers, offering a $500 reward for information about the whereabouts of Carlotta Vaughn, alias Elinor Denovo, between April and October 1944. After placing the ads, Archie leaves to spend the weekend at Lily's place in the country, during which he is annoyed by the presence of Floyd Vance, an obnoxious press agent.

By Thursday afternoon, few leads have been turned up by the newspaper ad and no useful information has come in. Wolfe, who has shown the situation's desperation by exceeding his quota of beer, declares that he has decided to assume that Amy's father killed her mother, since a three-month-old murder will be easier to solve than a 22-year-old mystery. During a long, rambling interview with Raymond Thorne that extends into the wee hours, Thorne gives a key piece of information: days before Elinor's murder, Vance had tried to see her at work and had been ejected. Archie realizes that Vance matches the description, provided by a waiter in response to the ad, of Elinor's 1944 dining companion.

The next morning, Wolfe summons Saul to work with Archie on an approach on Vance. Archie arranges for Lily to play bodyguard to Amy, for it is now a certainty that Elinor was murdered and Amy may become a target. Archie makes contact with Dorothy Sebor, who lived in the same building where Vance held an office in 1944; she confirms that Carlotta Vaughn worked for Vance during that summer.

Archie invites Vance to Wolfe's office for an interview. Vance denies having impregnated Carlotta and leaves, after which Archie and Saul collect all the items he touched and box them for the police. Archie delivers them the next morning; hours later, Inspector Cramer and Sergeant Stebbins come to Wolfe's office, having matched Vance's prints to those taken from a cigar case in the car that killed Elinor. Wolfe waits until the police reveal Vance's motive for the murder, then calls Jarrett to the office.

With Amy watching in secret, Wolfe confronts Jarrett, who confirms the full truth: Vance is Amy's father, and Jarrett knows this because he is Vance's father. Wolfe demands from Jarrett, for his responsibility in placing two weeks of strain on Amy, a $50,000 check in payment of services as replacement for Amy's retainer. He receives that check several months later, three days after Vance is convicted of first-degree murder.

== The unfamiliar word ==
Nero Wolfe's erudite vocabulary is one of the hallmarks of the character. The Father Hunt includes these examples:

- "Cogitable", a word deemed "rare" by Oxford Dictionaries, appears in chapter 5, in Archie's reply to a question about whether Mrs. Denovo's death was premeditated murder: "Mr. Wolfe would say it's 'cogitable.' He likes words like that." The word is a synonym for 'conceivable'.
- "Mantic", chapter 9: relating to divination or prophecy.

== Cast of characters ==
- Nero Wolfe — The private investigator
- Archie Goodwin — Wolfe's assistant, and the narrator of all Wolfe stories
- Lily Rowan — Manhattan socialite and heiress who is Archie's main romantic interest throughout the corpus
- Amy Denovo — Smith graduate hired by Lily Rowan to assist in collecting material for a book about Lily's father
- Elinor Denovo — Amy's mother, killed in a hit-and-run three months before
- Lon Cohen — Of the Gazette
- Inspector Cramer and Sergeant Purley Stebbins — Of Manhattan Homicide South
- Mortimer Hotchkiss and Mr. Atwood — Of Continental Bank and Trust
- Avery Ballou — A director of the Seaboard Bank and Trust Company
- Cyrus M. Jarrett — Of Seaboard
- Bertram McCray — A vice president of Seaboard; formerly Cyrus M. Jarrett's secretary and protégé
- Eugene Jarrett — Son of Cyrus M. Jarrett, and a vice president of Seaboard
- Floyd Vance — public relations counselor
- James O'Dell Worthington — Physician
- Doc Vollmer — Physician and neighbor to Nero Wolfe
- Salvatore Manzoni — Waiter
- Nathaniel Parker — Nero Wolfe's attorney
- Dorothy Sebor — Of Sebor Shopping Service, Rockefeller Center; "You are the most beautiful woman I ever laid eyes on," Archie tells her
- Saul Panzer, Fred Durkin and Orrie Cather — Freelance detectives employed by Wolfe

== Accolades ==
In January 1969, the Crime Writers' Association presented Stout with its Silver Dagger Award for The Father Hunt, which it named "the best crime novel by a non-British author in 1968."

== Publication history ==
- 1968, New York: Viking, May 28, 1968, hardcover

In his limited-edition pamphlet, Collecting Mystery Fiction #10, Rex Stout's Nero Wolfe Part II, Otto Penzler describes the first edition of The Father Hunt: "Red boards, black cloth spine; front and rear covers blank; spine printed with white. Issued in a mainly red pictorial dust wrapper."
In April 2006, Firsts: The Book Collector's Magazine estimated that the first edition of The Father Hunt had a value of between $100 and $200. The estimate is for a copy in very good to fine condition in a like dustjacket.

- 1968, New York: Viking (Mystery Guild), August 1968, hardcover

The far less valuable Viking book club edition may be distinguished from the first edition in three ways:

- The dust jacket has "Book Club Edition" printed on the inside front flap, and the price is absent (first editions may be price clipped if they were given as gifts).
- Book club editions are sometimes thinner and always taller (usually a quarter of an inch) than first editions.
- Book club editions are bound in cardboard, and first editions are bound in cloth (or have at least a cloth spine).

- 1968, Argosy, November 1968 (abridged)
- 1969, London: Collins Crime Club, March 1969, hardcover
- 1969, New York: Bantam #H4467, June 1969, paperback
- 1970, London: Fontana, 1970, paperback
- 1995, US, Bantam Books ISBN 0-553-76297-4 January 2, 1995, paperback
- 2005, US, The Audio Partners Publishing Corp., Mystery Masters ISBN 1-57270-459-4 May 10, 2005, audio CD (unabridged, read by Michael Prichard)
- 2010, New York: Bantam ISBN 978-0-307-75591-9 May 26, 2010, e-book
