= Nero Wolfe =

Fictional character

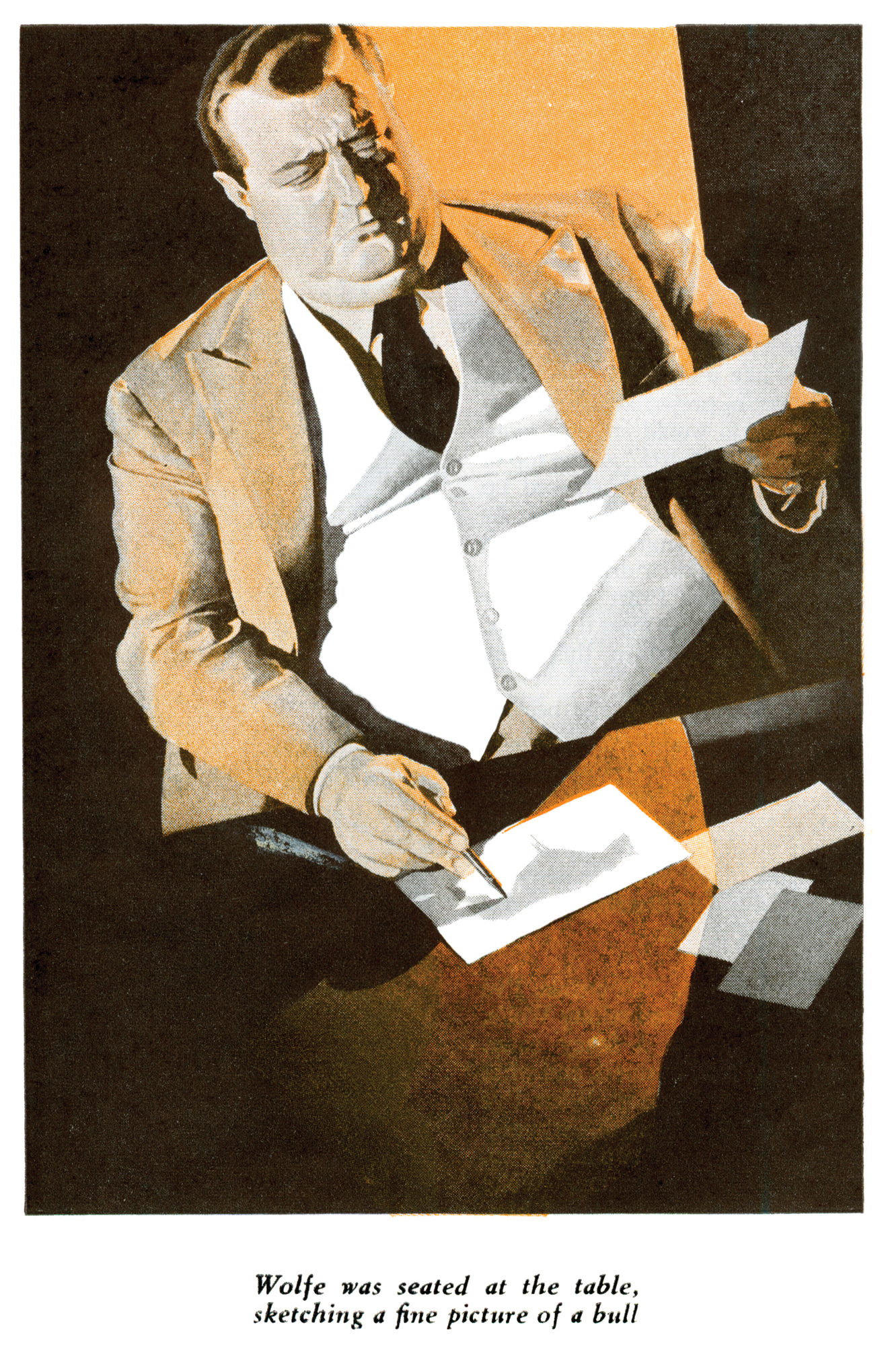
- Carl Mueller illustrated "The Red Bull" (1938) for The American Magazine
- First appearance: Fer-de-Lance (1934)
- Created by: Rex Stout

In-universe information
- Gender: Male
- Occupation: Private detective
- Children: Carla Lovchen Britton (adopted daughter)
- Nationality: Montenegrin
- Citizenship: United States by naturalization

Nero Wolfe is a brilliant, obese and eccentric fictional armchair detective created in 1934 by American mystery writer Rex Stout. Wolfe was born in Montenegro and keeps his past murky. He lives in a luxurious brownstone on West 35th Street in New York City, and he is loath to leave his home for business or anything that would keep him from reading his books, tending his orchids, or eating the gourmet meals prepared by his chef, Fritz Brenner. Archie Goodwin, Wolfe's sharp-witted, dapper young confidential assistant with an eye for attractive women, narrates the cases and does the legwork for the detective genius.

Stout published 33 novels and 41 novellas and short stories featuring Wolfe from 1934 to 1975, with most of them set in New York City. The stories have been adapted for film, radio, television and the stage. The Nero Wolfe corpus was nominated for Best Mystery Series of the Century in 2000 at Bouchercon XXXI, the world's largest mystery convention, and Rex Stout was a nominee for Best Mystery Writer of the Century.

== Title character ==
I suggest beginning with autobiographical sketches from each of us, and here is mine. I was born in Montenegro and spent my early boyhood there. At the age of sixteen I decided to move around, and in fourteen years I became acquainted with most of Europe, a little of Africa, and much of Asia, in a variety of roles and activities. Coming to this country in nineteen-thirty, not penniless, I bought this house and entered into practice as a private detective. I am a naturalized American citizen.

— Nero Wolfe addressing the suspects in "Fourth of July Picnic" (1957)

Although the Nero Wolfe stories take place contemporaneously with their writing and depict a changing landscape and society, the principal characters do not age. According to a memo prepared by Rex Stout in 1949, Nero Wolfe's age is 56, although this is not explicitly stated in the stories. (Note: Rex Stout prepared a confidential memo dated September 14, 1949 to assist the producers of the Sydney Greenstreet radio series The New Adventures of Nero Wolfe. Under the heading "Description of Nero Wolfe", Stout begins: "Height 5 ft. 11 in. Weight 272 lbs. Age 56.")

"Those stories have ignored time for thirty-nine years," Stout told his authorized biographer, John McAleer. "Any reader who can't or won't do the same should skip them. I didn't age the characters because I didn't want to. That would have made it cumbersome and would seem to have centered attention on the characters rather than the stories."

According to the same memo, Wolfe's height is 5 ft 11 in (1.80 m) and his weight is 272 lb (123 kg). Archie Goodwin, the narrator of the stories, frequently describes Wolfe as weighing "a seventh of a ton" (equivalent to about 286 pounds). This was intended to indicate unusual obesity at the time of the first book (1934), especially through the use of the word "ton" as the unit of measure. In a single short story written in 1947, Archie writes, "He weighs between 310 and 390, and he limits his physical movements to what he regards as the irreducible essentials." (Note: In Too Many Women (1947, chapter 5), Archie estimates Wolfe's weight at close to 340, and in the 1949 short story "Door To Death", his weight is given as a sixth (not a seventh) of a ton, or about 333 pounds. In In the Best Families (1953), Wolfe temporarily sheds 117 pounds.)

"Wolfe's most extravagant distinction is his extreme antipathy to literal extravagance. He will not move," wrote J. Kenneth Van Dover in At Wolfe's Door: The Nero Wolfe Novels of Rex Stout:

He insists upon the point: under no circumstances will he leave his home or violate his routines in order to facilitate an investigation. The exceptions are few and remarkable. Instead of spreading the principles of order and justice throughout his society, Wolfe imposes them dogmatically and absolutely within the walls of his house—the brownstone on West Thirty-Fifth Street—and he invites those who are troubled by an incomprehensible and threatening environment to enter the controlled economy of the house and to discover there the source of disorder in their own lives. The invitation is extended to readers as well as to clients.

In The Black Mountain Wolfe leaves not only the brownstone but the United States to avenge the murder of his oldest friend. Despite his physical bulk, he engages in strenuous outdoor activity in mountain terrain.

=== Origins ===
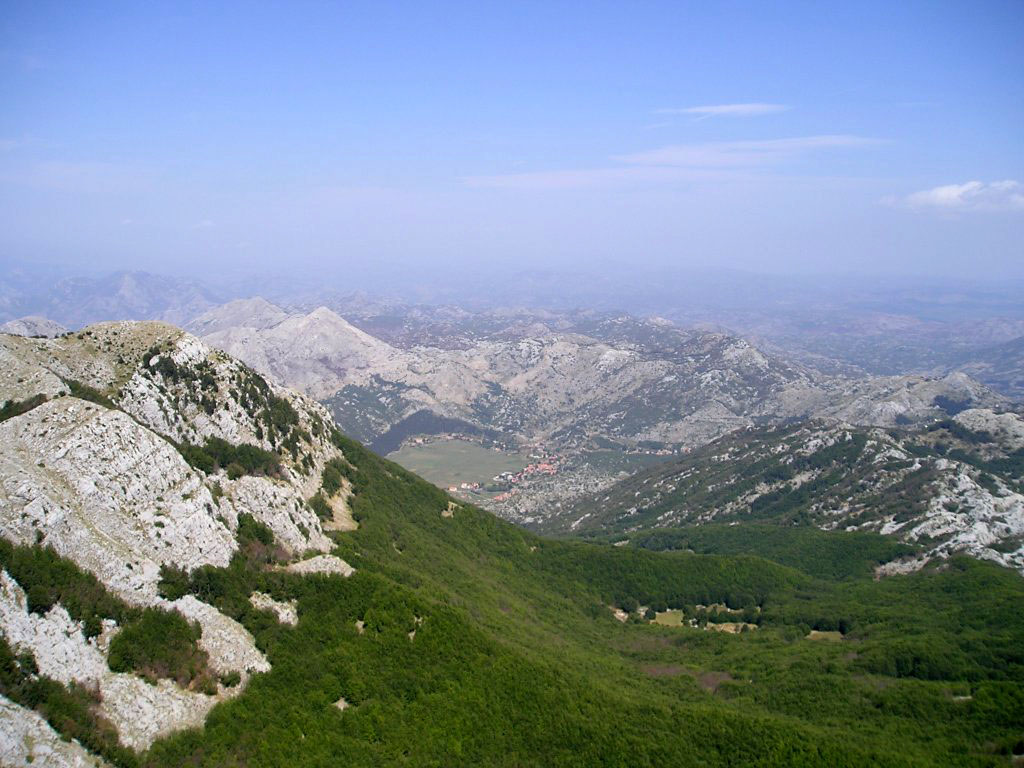
Nero Wolfe and his boyhood friend Marko Vukčić hunted dragonflies in the mountains where Wolfe was born, in the vicinity of Lovćen

You, gentlemen, are Americans, much more completely than I am, for I wasn't born here. This is your native country. It was you and your brothers, black and white, who let me come here and live, and I hope you'll let me say, without getting maudlin, that I'm grateful to you for it.

— Nero Wolfe speaking to the black staff of Kanawha Spa in Too Many Cooks (1938), chapter 10

The corpus implies or states that Nero Wolfe was born in Montenegro, with one exception: In the first chapter of Over My Dead Body (1939), Wolfe tells an FBI agent that he was born in the United States – a declaration at odds with all other references. Stout revealed the reason for the discrepancy in a 1940 letter cited by his authorized biographer, John McAleer: "In the original draft of Over My Dead Body Nero was a Montenegrin by birth, and it all fitted previous hints as to his background; but violent protests from The American Magazine, supported by Farrar & Rinehart, caused his cradle to be transported five thousand miles." (Note: See also Over My Dead Body.)

"I got the idea of making Wolfe a Montenegrin from Louis Adamic," Stout said, noting that everything he knew about Montenegrins he learned from Adamic's book, The Native's Return (1934), or from Adamic himself.

"Adamic describes the Montenegrin male as tall, commanding, dignified, courteous, hospitable," McAleer wrote. "He is reluctant to work, accustomed to isolation from women. He places women in a subordinate role. He is a romantic idealist, apt to go in for dashing effects to express his spirited nature. He is strong in family loyalties, has great pride, is impatient of restraint. Love of freedom is his outstanding trait. He is stubborn, fearless, unsubduable, capable of great self-denial to uphold his ideals. He is fatalistic toward death. In short, Rex had found for Wolfe a nationality that fitted him to perfection."

Wolfe is reticent about his youth, but apparently he was athletic, fit, and adventurous. In the earliest novels, Wolfe had been living in the brownstone on West Thirty-Fifth Street since about 1914, but in later novels this chronology is retconned away and Wolfe did not arrive in the US until 1930. Before World War I, he spied for the Austrian government's Evidenzbureau, but had a change of heart when the war began. He then joined the Serbian-Montenegrin army and fought against the Austrians and Germans. That means that he was likely to have been involved in the harrowing 1915 withdrawal of the defeated Serbian army, when thousands of soldiers died from disease, starvation, and sheer exhaustion (Note: "I starved to death in 1916," Wolfe states in the first chapter of Over My Dead Body. "When the Austrians came and we fought machine guns with fingernails. Logically I was dead; a man can't live on dry grass. Actually I went on breathing. When the United States entered the war and I walked six hundred miles to join the A.E.F., I ate again.") – which might help to explain the comfort-loving habits that are such a conspicuous part of Wolfe's character. He joined the American Expeditionary Forces, and after a time in Europe and North Africa, he came to the United States.

==== Influences ====
According to John J. McAleer, Rex Stout's official biographer, during his stint in the Navy, Stout came into contact with Alvey A. Adee, who was a major influence on Stout's creation of Nero Wolfe. Adee was a scholar, sleuth, gourmet, bachelor, a model of efficiency, a master of the English language, and is said to have inspired the characterization of Wolfe. Rex Stout's maternal grandmother, Emily Todhunter, was also an inspiration. She was obese, required a special chair, was addicted to atlases, dictionaries and flowers, and was an omnivorous reader.

Archie was modeled on Chief A. G. Goodwin, an officer who recovered Rex Stout's stolen record collection.

==== Suppositions ====
In 1956, J. D. Clark theorized in an article in The Baker Street Journal that Sherlock Holmes and Irene Adler (a character from "A Scandal in Bohemia") had an affair in Montenegro in 1892, and that Nero Wolfe was the result. The idea was later co-opted by W. S. Baring-Gould and implied in the novels of Nicholas Meyer and John Lescroart, but there is no evidence that Rex Stout had any such connection in mind. Certainly there is no mention of it in any of the stories, although a painting of Sherlock Holmes does hang over Archie Goodwin's desk in Nero Wolfe's office. Some commentators note both physical and psychological resemblances and suggest Sherlock's brother Mycroft Holmes as a more likely father for Wolfe. Commentators have noted a coincidence in the names "Sherlock Holmes" and "Nero Wolfe": The same vowels appear in the same order. In 1957, Ellery Queen called this "The great O-E theory" and suggested that it was derived from the father of mysteries, Edgar Allan Poe. Wolfe's mother is mentioned only twice in Stout's stories: the first novel, Fer-de-Lance (1934), and the third, The Rubber Band (1936) — both mention that she lives in Budapest, and the former adds that Wolfe sends her a monthly check.

Some Wold Newton theorists have suggested the French thief Arsène Lupin as the father of Nero Wolfe. They note that in one story Lupin has an affair with the queen of a Balkan principality, which may be Montenegro by another name. Further, they note that the name Lupin resembles the French word for wolf, loup.

=== Brownstone ===
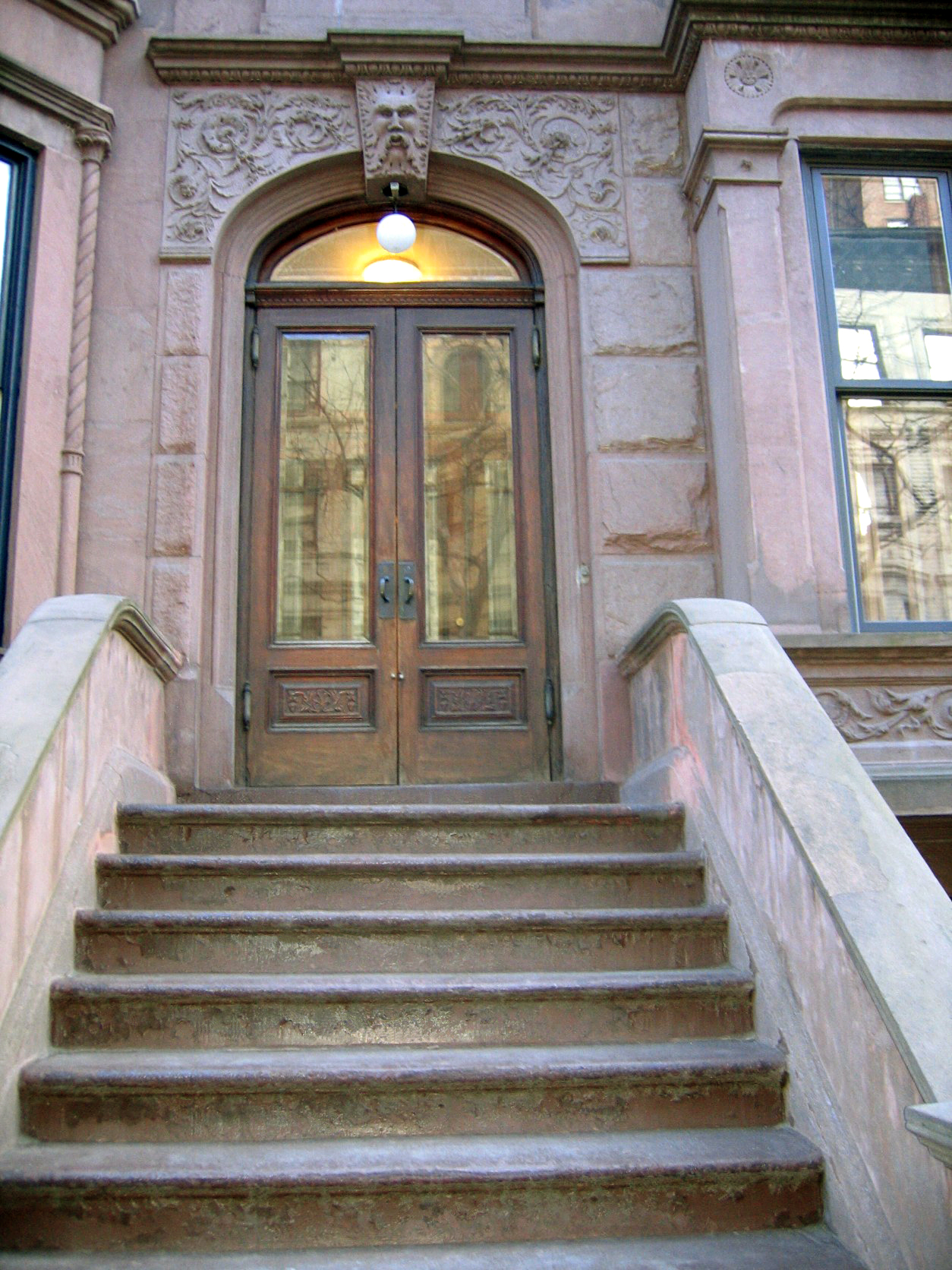

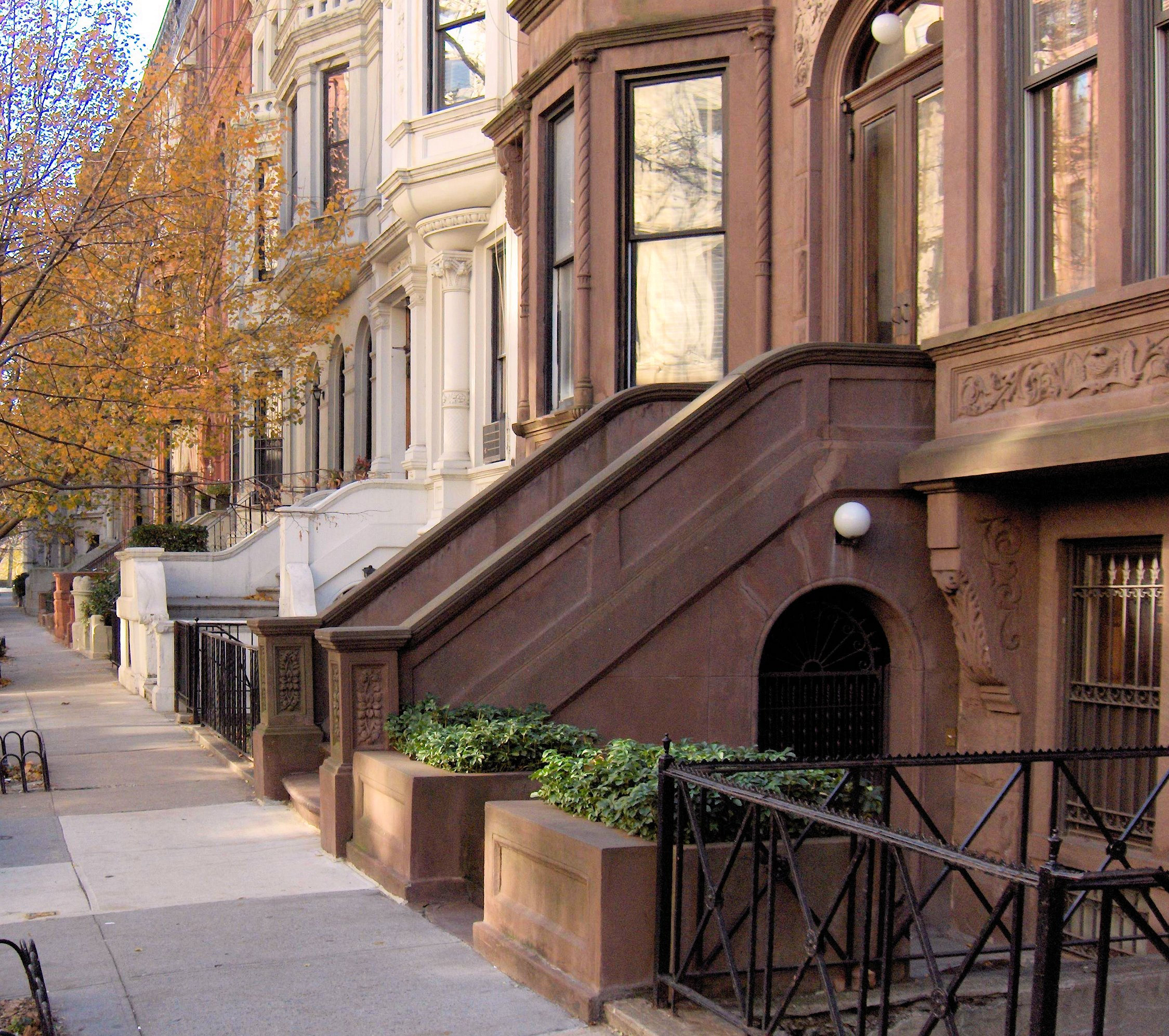
Manhattan brownstone used for exteriors in A&E TV's Nero Wolfe

I rarely leave my house. I do like it here. I would be an idiot to leave this chair, made to fit me —

— Nero Wolfe in "Before I Die" (1947), chapter 2

Wolfe has expensive tastes, living in a comfortable and luxurious New York City brownstone on the south side of West 35th Street. The brownstone has three floors plus a large basement with living quarters, a rooftop greenhouse also with living quarters, and a small elevator, used almost exclusively by Wolfe. Other unique features include a timer-activated window-opening device that regulates the temperature in Wolfe's bedroom, an alarm system that sounds a gong in Archie's room if someone approaches Wolfe's bedroom door or windows, and climate-controlled plant rooms on the top floor. Wolfe is a well-known amateur orchid grower and has 10,000 plants in the brownstone's greenhouse. He employs three live-in staff to see to his needs: Archie Goodwin (assistant), Fritz Brenner (chef), and Theodore Horstmann (orchidist).

The front door is equipped with a chain bolt, a bell that can be shut off as needed, and a pane of one-way glass, which enables Archie to see who is on the stoop before deciding whether to open the door. (Note: In most of the corpus, it is seven steps from the sidewalk to the stoop (for example, "The Squirt and the Monkey"; Before Midnight, chapter 5; Might as Well Be Dead, chapter 2; A Family Affair, chapter 3), but it is eight steps in "Booby Trap", chapter 5.) The front room is used as a waiting area for visitors while Archie informs Wolfe of their arrival, and also as a place for Archie to hide one visitor from another.

Wolfe's bedroom is on the second floor of the brownstone, and Archie's is on the third. Each of these floors also includes one spare bedroom, used on occasion to house a variety of clients, witnesses, and sometimes even culprits. Wolfe takes pride in being able to offer such assistance and once remarked, "The guest is a jewel resting on the cushion of hospitality". (Note: Too Many Cooks, chapter 6)

Wolfe's office becomes nearly soundproof when the doors connecting it to the front room and the hallway are closed. There is a small hole in the office wall covered by what Archie calls a "trick picture of a waterfall". (Note: The Doorbell Rang, chapter 13) (Note: According to chapter 16 of Too Many Clients, the waterfall picture measures 14 by 17 inches.) A person in an alcove at the end of the hallway can open a sliding panel covering the hole, so as to see and hear conversations and other events in the office without being noticed. The chair behind Wolfe's desk is custom-built, with special springs to hold his weight; according to Archie, it is the only chair that Wolfe really enjoys sitting in. (Note: Wolfe has another chair in the bedroom that is nearly as good as the one in the office. In "Help Wanted, Male" (chapter 5) it is called his "number two chair".) Near the desk is a large chair upholstered in red leather, which is usually reserved for Inspector Cramer, a current or prospective client, or the person whom Wolfe and Archie want to question. In the short story "The Squirt and the Monkey", Wolfe and Archie have a hidden tape recorder and microphone installed in the office, with controls in the kitchen. In the story "Eeny Meeny Murder Mo", the system is modified to transmit sound to a speaker in the front room.

The brownstone has a back entrance leading to a private garden, as noted in Champagne for One (chapter 10) and elsewhere, from which a passage leads to 34th Street—used to enter or leave Wolfe's home when it is necessary to evade surveillance. Archie says that Fritz tries to grow herbs such as chives in the garden.

"That readers have proved endlessly fascinated with the topography of Wolfe's brownstone temple should not be surprising", wrote J. Kenneth Van Dover in At Wolfe's Door:

It is the center from which moral order emanates, and the details of its layout and its operations are signs of its stability. For forty years, Wolfe prepares menus with Fritz and pots orchids with Theodore. For forty years, Archie takes notes at his desk, the client sits in the red chair and the other principals distribute themselves in the yellow chairs, and Wolfe presides from his custom-made throne. For forty years, Inspector Cramer and Sergeant Purley Stebbins ring the doorbell, enter the office, and explode with indignation at Wolfe's intractability. The front room, the elevator, the three-foot globe—all persist in place through forty years of American history. ... Like Holmes's 221B Baker Street, Wolfe's West Thirty-Fifth Street remains a fixed point in a turning world.

In the course of the books, ten different street addresses are given on West 35th Street:

- 506 in Over My Dead Body, chapter 12
- 618 in Too Many Clients, chapter 4
- 902 in Murder by the Book, chapter 7
- 909 in Before I Die, chapter 10
- 914 in Too Many Women, chapter 24
- 918 in The Red Box, chapter 3
- 919 in The Silent Speaker, chapter 12
- 922 in The Silent Speaker, chapter 2
- 924 in Man Alive, chapter 9
- 938 in Death of a Doxy, chapter 4 (Note: Ken Darby identifies the ten brownstone addresses and additional stories in which they appear. The most frequently used address for Nero Wolfe's residence is 918 West 35th Street—the address that Darby found in The Red Box, And Be a Villain, "The Next Witness" and "Method Three for Murder".)

"Curiously, the 900 block of West 35th Street would be in the Hudson River", wrote American writer Randy Cohen, who created a map of the literary stars' homes for The New York Times in 2005. "It's a non-address, the real estate equivalent of those 555 telephone numbers used in movies." Cohen settled on 922 West 35th Street—the address printed on Archie's business card in The Silent Speaker—as Nero Wolfe's address. On the "Literary Map of Manhattan", the brownstone is numbered 58 and is placed in the middle of the Hudson River.

It is described in the opening chapter of The Second Confession as being on West Thirty-Fifth Street "nearly to 11th Avenue", which would put it in the 500 block.

Writing as Archie Goodwin, Ken Darby suggests that "the actual location was on East 22nd Street in the Gramercy Park District. ... Wolfe merely moved us, fictionally, from one place to the other in order to preserve his particular brand of privacy. As far as I can discover, there never were brownstone houses on West 35th Street." (Note: Stout was playfully erratic about details in the stories. Besides the varying street addresses, he retained minor inconsistencies, and catching them is one of the pleasures of readers of the Nero Wolfe stories. Inspector Cramer's first name, rarely invoked, was originally Fergus, and later modified to L.T. Wolfe's attorney Nathaniel Parker was also known as Henry Parker and Henry Barber. An assistant district attorney was either Mandel or Mandelbaum. The same surnames are assigned to supporting characters in different stories: Jarrett, Jaret, Jarrell, Dykes, Annis, Avery, Bowen, Yerkes, Whipple and others.)

The absence of brownstones in Wolfe's neighborhood sent television producers to the Upper West Side of Manhattan for an appropriate home and setting for select exterior shots, used in the A&E TV series Nero Wolfe. This Manhattan brownstone lacked some peculiarities of Wolfe's home, unlike the model specially constructed on the Toronto set where most of the series was filmed (Note: "And Hutton, bless him, took pains to make sure that the stoop, meticulously recreated in a freezing Ontario warehouse soundstage really did have seven steps", reported Martin Sieff of United Press International.)—for example, the correct number of steps leading up to the stoop. It was, therefore, shown from angles that would camouflage any slight discrepancies. (Note: WireImage (image numbers 253302 – 253308) and Getty Images (image number 1302172) document the location photography directed by Timothy Hutton on October 15, 2000, also seen in the A&E documentary The Making of Nero Wolfe.) The series settled on "914" for the brownstone's address. This number can be seen on the studio set representing the front door exterior in several episodes and on a closeup of Archie's paycheck in "Prisoner's Base".

=== Food ===
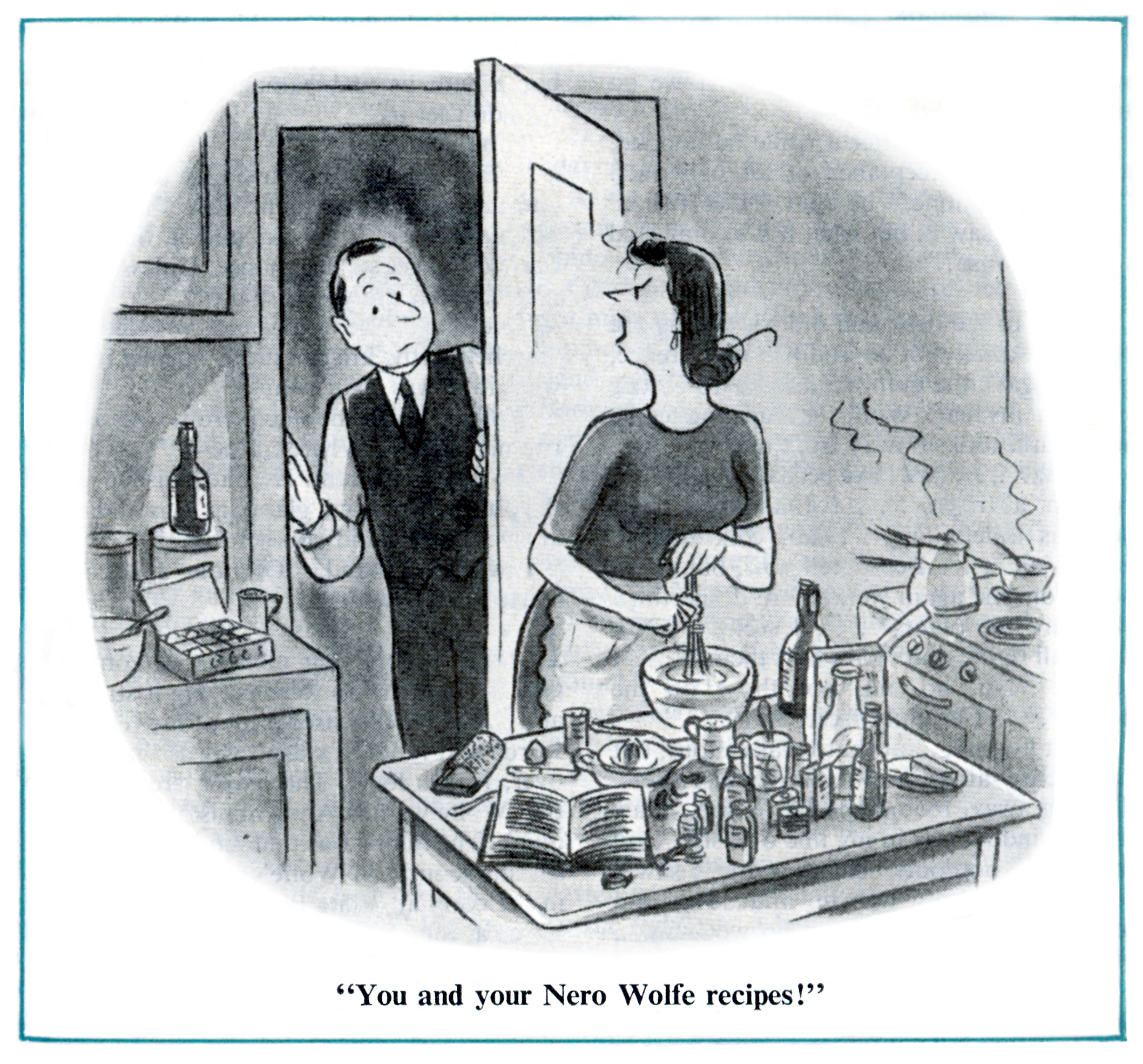
Cartoon by Stan Hunt for The American Magazine (June 1949)

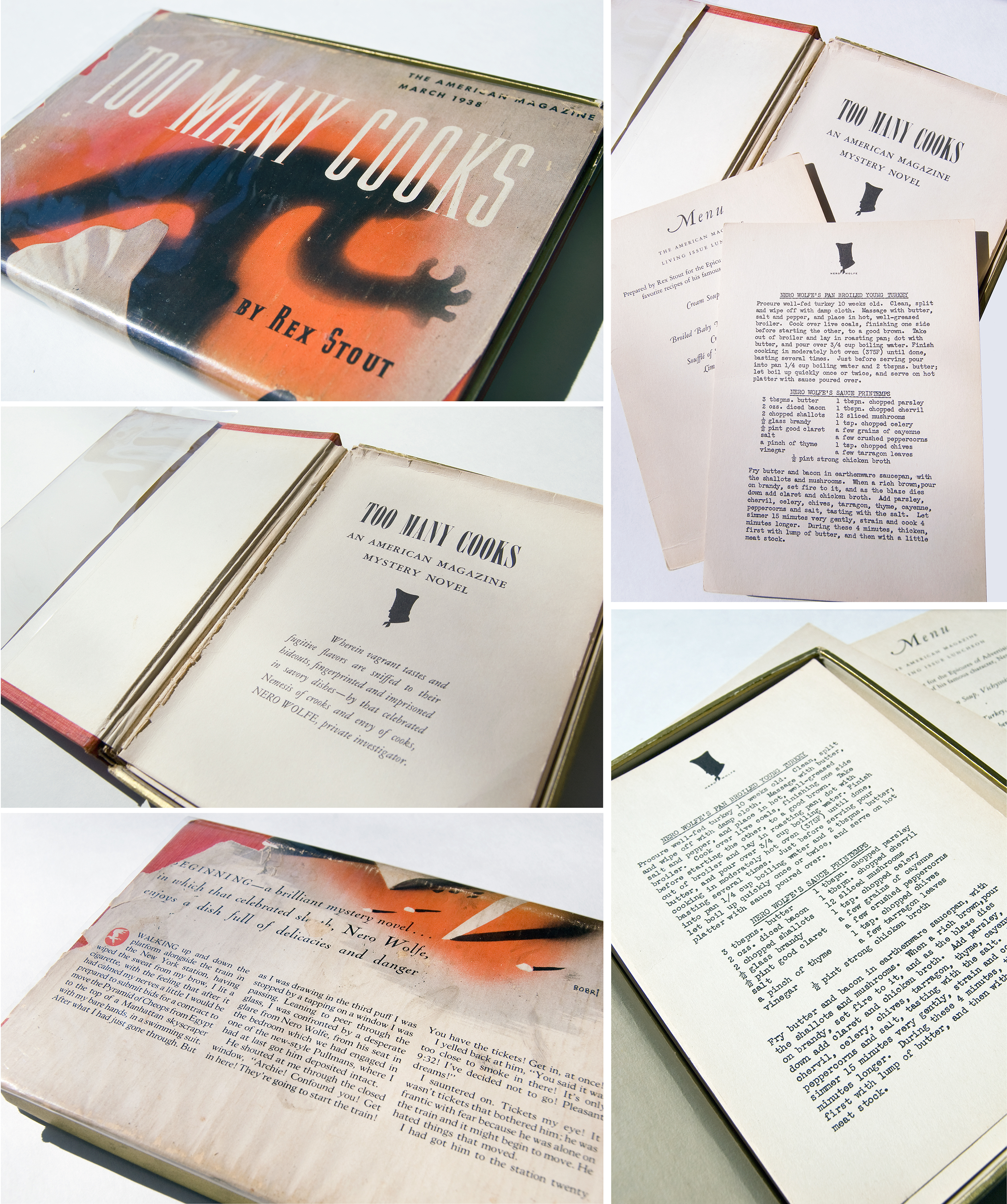
Designed to look like a book, a boxed set of Nero Wolfe recipes was created by The American Magazine to promote the March 1938 debut of Too Many Cooks

Once he burned up a cookbook because it said to remove the hide from a ham end before putting it in the pot with lima beans. Which he loves most, food or words, is a tossup.

— Archie Goodwin in Gambit (1962), chapter 1

Good food is a keystone (along with reading) of Wolfe's mostly leisured existence. He is both a gourmand and a gourmet, enjoying generous helpings of Fritz's cuisine three times a day. Shad roe is a particular favorite, prepared in a number of different ways. Archie enjoys his food but lacks Wolfe's discerning palate, lamenting in The Final Deduction (chapter 9) that "Every spring I get so fed up with shad roe that I wish to heaven fish would figure out some other way. Whales have." Shad roe is frequently the first course, followed by roasted or braised duck, another Wolfe favorite.

Archie also complains that there is never corned beef or rye bread on Wolfe's table, and he sometimes ducks out to eat a corned beef sandwich at a nearby diner. Yet a young woman gives Wolfe a lesson in preparing corned beef hash in "Cordially Invited to Meet Death". Another contradiction is found in Plot It Yourself when Archie goes to a diner to eat "fried chicken like my Aunt Margie used to make it back in Ohio", since Fritz does not fry chicken. But in The Golden Spiders, Fritz prepares fried chicken for Wolfe, Archie, Saul, Orrie, and Fred.

Wolfe displays an oenophile's knowledge of wine and brandy, but it is only implied that he drinks either. In And Be a Villain (chapter 17), he issues a dinner invitation and regrets doing so on short notice: "There will not be time to chambrer a claret properly, but we can have the chill off." Continuing the invitation, Wolfe says of a certain brandy, "I hope this won't shock you, but the way to do it is to sip it with bites of Fritz's apple pie."

On weekdays, Fritz serves Wolfe his breakfast in his bedroom. Archie eats his separately in the kitchen, although Wolfe might ask Fritz to send Archie upstairs if he has morning instructions for him. Regularly scheduled mealtimes for lunch and dinner are part of Wolfe's daily routine. In an early story, Wolfe tells a guest that luncheon is served daily at 1 p.m. and dinner at 8 p.m., although later stories suggest that lunchtime may have been changed to 1:15 or 1:30, at least on Fridays. Lunch and dinner are served in the dining room, on the opposite side of the first-floor hallway from the front room and the office. However, Archie will eat separately in the kitchen if he is in a rush due to pressing business or a social engagement, because Wolfe cannot bear to see a meal rushed. Wolfe also has a rule against discussing business at the table, sometimes bent but very rarely overtly broken.

In the earliest books, Archie reports that Wolfe is subject to what he terms a "relapse"—a period of several days during which Wolfe refuses to work or even to listen to Archie badger him about work. The cause is unknown. Wolfe either takes to bed and eats nothing but bread and onion soup, or else he consults with Fritz on menus and the preparation of nonstop meals. In Fer-de-Lance (chapter 6), Archie reports that, during a relapse, Wolfe once ate half a sheep in two days, different parts cooked in 20 different ways. The relapse also appears briefly in The League of Frightened Men (chapter 11), The Red Box (chapter 6), and Where There's a Will (chapter 12), but subsequently disappears from the corpus as a plot device—possibly because Archie eventually discovered how to shut down a relapse during its earliest stages, as chronicled in The Red Box.

Wolfe views much of life through the prism of food and dining, going so far as to say that Voltaire "... wasn't a man at all, since he had no palate and a dried-up stomach." He knows enough about fine cuisine to lecture on American cooking to Les Quinze Maîtres (a group of the 15 finest chefs in the world) in Too Many Cooks and to dine with the Ten for Aristology (a group of epicures) in "Poison à la Carte". Wolfe does not, however, enjoy visiting restaurants (with the occasional exception of Rusterman's, owned for a time by Wolfe's best friend Marko Vukčić and later subject to Wolfe's trusteeship). In The Red Box (chapter 11), Wolfe states, "I know nothing of restaurants; short of compulsion, I would not eat in one were Vatel himself the chef."

Wolfe appears to know his way around the kitchen; in Too Many Cooks (chapter 17), he tells Jerome Berin, "I spend quite a little time in the kitchen myself." In The Doorbell Rang, he offers to cook Yorkshire Buck and, in "Immune to Murder", the State Department asks him to prepare trout Montbarry for a visiting dignitary. In The Black Mountain, Wolfe and Goodwin stay briefly in an unoccupied house in Italy on their way to Montenegro; Wolfe prepares a pasta dish using Romano cheese that, from "his memory of local custom", he finds in a hole in the ground. During the short story "Murder Is Corny", he lectures Inspector Cramer on the right and wrong ways to cook corn on the cob, insisting that it must be roasted rather than boiled in order to achieve the best flavor. (The 1940 story "Bitter End" suggests the contrary view that Wolfe was unable to prepare his own meals; Fritz's illness with the flu causes a household crisis and forces Wolfe to resort to canned liver pâté for his lunch.)

Wolfe's meals generally include an appetizer, a main course, a salad served after the entrée (with the salad dressing mixed at tableside and used immediately), and a dessert course with coffee. (After-dinner coffee, however, is often taken by Wolfe and Archie in the office rather than the dining room.)

Many of the dishes referred to in the various Nero Wolfe stories and novels were collected and published, complete with recipes, as The Nero Wolfe Cookbook by Rex Stout and the Editors of the Viking Press, published in 1973. All recipes are prefaced with a brief excerpt from the book or story that made reference to that particular dish.

=== Beer ===
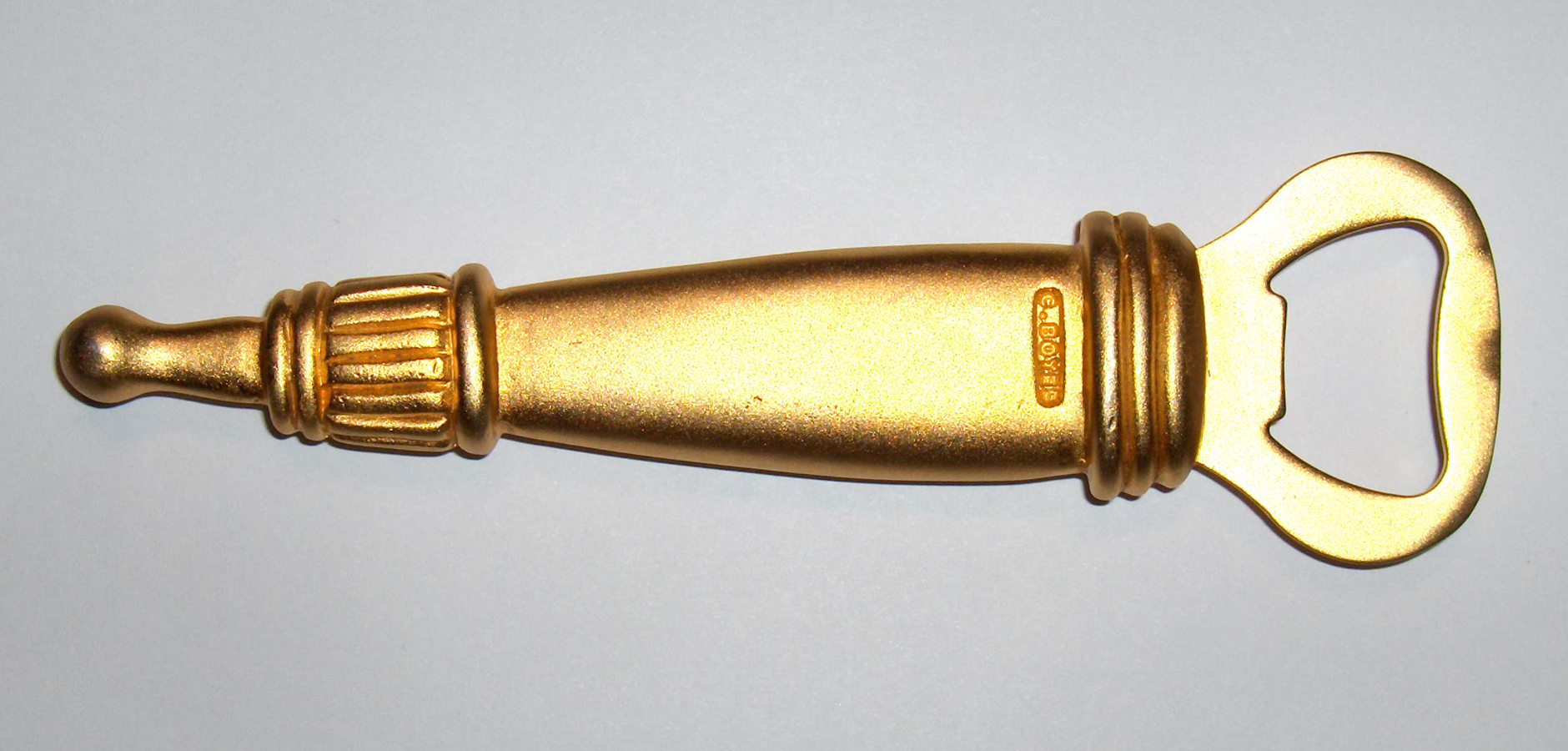
Gold plated bottle opener from the A&E TV series Nero Wolfe

[Fritz] served Wolfe's beer first, the bottle unopened because that's a rule, and Wolfe got his opener from the drawer, a gold one Marko Vukcic had given him that didn't work very well.

— Archie Goodwin in The Father Hunt (1968), chapter 5

Nero Wolfe's first recorded words are, "Where's the beer?"

The first novel, Fer-de-Lance, introduces Wolfe as he prepares to change his habits. With Prohibition at an end, he can stop buying kegs of bootleg beer and purchase it legally in bottles. Fritz brings in samples of 49 different brands for him to evaluate, from which he ultimately selects Remmers as his favorite. Several times during the story, Wolfe announces his intention to reduce his beer intake from six quarts a day to five. "I grinned at that, for I didn't believe it", Archie Goodwin writes.

=== Reading ===
Reading is central to Nero Wolfe's life, and books are central to the plots of many of the stories. The floor-to-ceiling bookshelves lining Wolfe's office contain some 1,200 books —the size of Stout's own library.

==== Select reading list ====
William S. Baring-Gould's summary of Wolfe's library was incorporated with contributions from others into an annotated reading list created by Winnifred Louis.

Author	Title	Reference in Nero Wolfe corpus	Chapter
Louis Adamic	The Native's Return	The League of Frightened Men	2
Robert Ardrey	African Genesis	Gambit	3
Lincoln Barnett	The Treasure of Our Tongue	The Doorbell Rang	4
Jacques Barzun	Science: The Glorious Entertainment	A Right to Die	11
Franz Boas	Autographed copies	Too Many Cooks	10
Lyman Bryson	An Outline of Man's Knowledge of the Modern World	Too Many Clients	5
Albert Camus	The Fall	"Fourth of July Picnic"	5
John Roy Carlson	Under Cover	"Booby Trap"	4
Rachel Carson	Silent Spring	The Mother Hunt	7
Bruce Catton	The Coming Fury	"Murder Is Corny"	6
Bruce Catton	Grant Takes Command	Please Pass the Guilt	2
Grenville Clark and Louis B. Sohn	World Peace Through World Law	Champagne for One	7
Fred J. Cook	The FBI Nobody Knows	The Doorbell Rang	1
Elmer Davis	But We Were Born Free	The Black Mountain	3
Clifton Fadiman	Party of One	Before Midnight	12
John Gunther	Inside Europe	Too Many Cooks	1
John Gunther	Inside Russia Today	"Method Three for Murder"	1
Lancelot Hogben	Mathematics for the Million	"The Zero Clue"	7
Rudyard Kipling	The Jungle Book	Death of a Doxy	9
Arthur Koestler	The Lotus and the Robot	The Final Deduction	2
William Kunstler	The Minister and the Choir Singer	A Right to Die	8
Christopher La Farge	Beauty for Ashes	Before Midnight	9
Christopher La Farge	The Sudden Guest	Too Many Women	16
T. E. Lawrence	Seven Pillars of Wisdom	The Red Box	12
Walter Lord	Incredible Victory	The Father Hunt	2
C. I. Lewis	A Survey of Symbolic Logic	Too Many Women	16
Merle Miller	A Secret Understanding	Might as Well Be Dead	8
Michel de Montaigne	Essays	Before Midnight	19
Louis Nizer	My Life in Court	"Murder Is Corny"	5
Dan Rather and Gary Gates	The Palace Guard	A Family Affair	2
A. L. Rowse	William Shakespeare: A Biography	A Right to Die	3
Walter Schneir and Miriam Schneir	Invitation to an Inquest	Death of a Doxy	2
William L. Shirer	The Rise and Fall of the Third Reich	"Kill Now—Pay Later"	3
Alexander Solzhenitsyn	The First Circle	Death of a Dude	7
John Steinbeck	Travels with Charley	The Mother Hunt	3
Ivan Turgenev	Stories	Please Pass the Guilt	14
Mark Van Doren	Poetry	And Be a Villain	1

=== Orchids ===
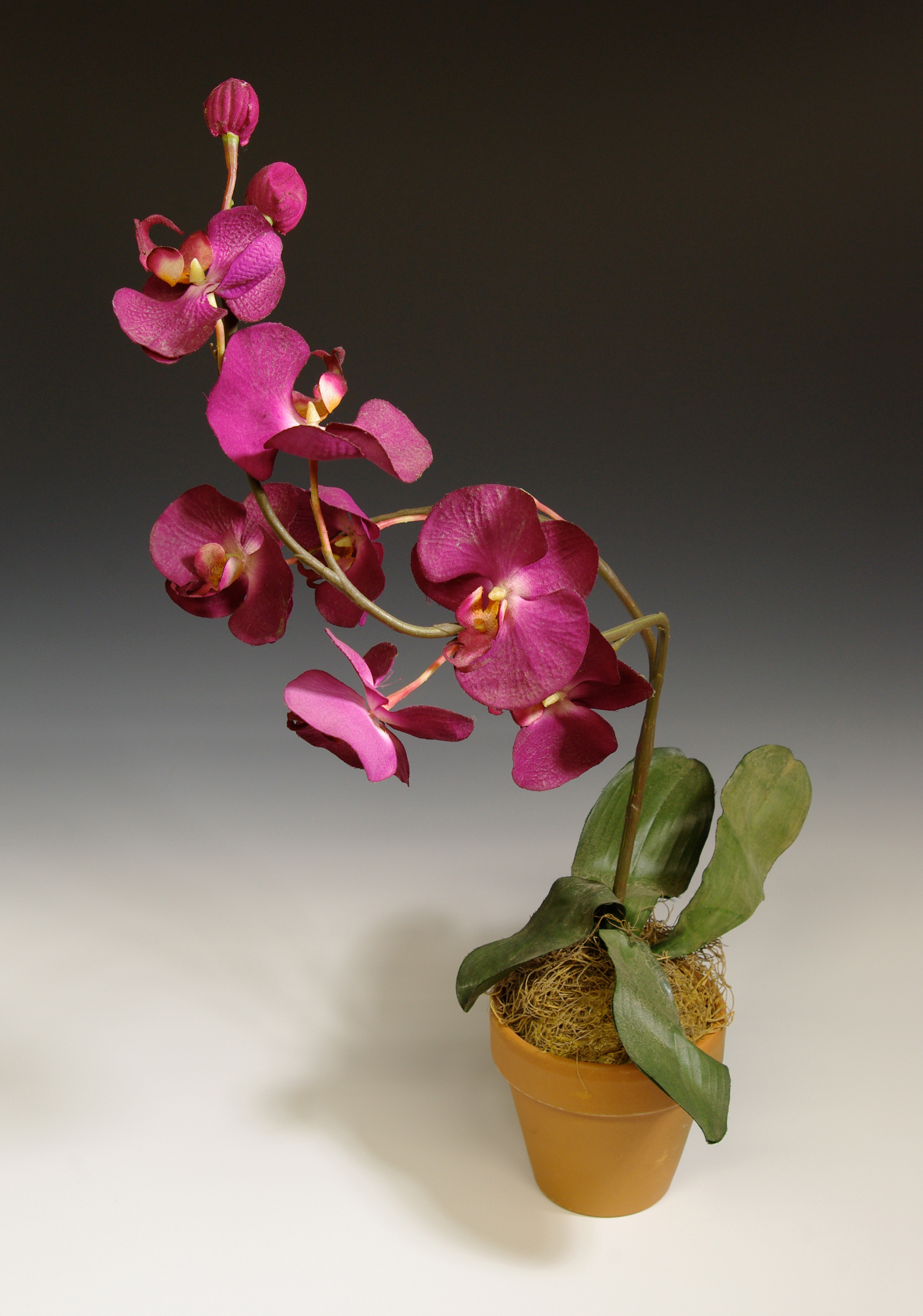
Silk orchid prop from A&E TV's Nero Wolfe

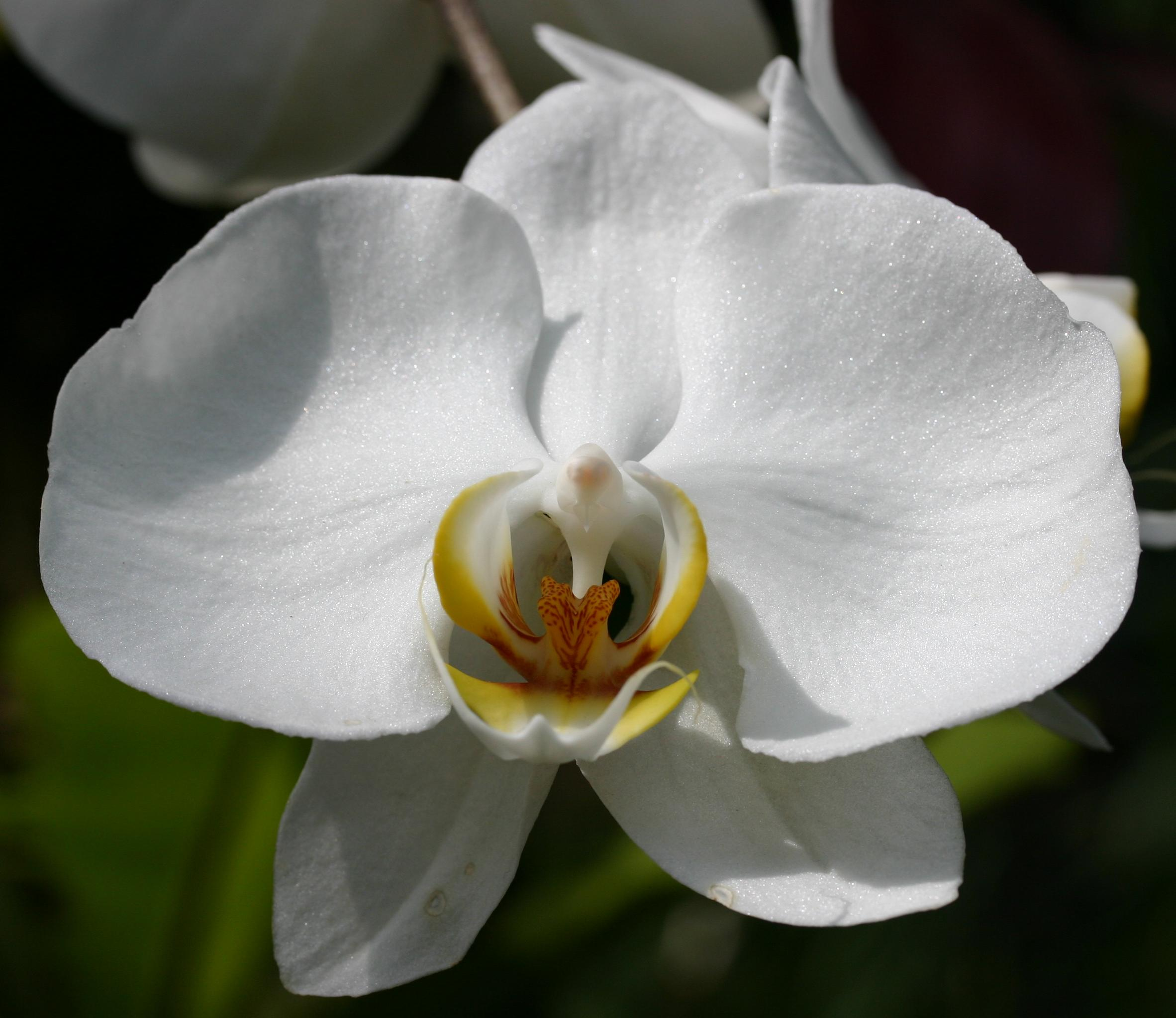
Phalaenopsis hybrid

Wolfe had once remarked to me that the orchids were his concubines: insipid, expensive, parasitic and temperamental. He brought them, in their diverse forms and colors, to the limits of their perfection, and then gave them away; he had never sold one.

— Archie Goodwin in The League of Frightened Men (1935), chapter 2

Known for rigidly maintaining his personal schedule, Nero Wolfe is most inflexible when it comes to his routine in the rooftop plant rooms. Every day except Sunday, from 9:00 to 11:00 in the morning, and from 4:00 to 6:00 in the afternoon, he looks after his orchid collection alongside his employee Theodore Horstmann, whom he calls the "best orchid nurse alive". (Horstmann himself is said to spend up to 12 hours a day in the plant rooms.)

"Wolfe spends four hours a day with his orchids. Clients must accommodate themselves to this schedule", wrote Rex Stout's biographer John J. McAleer. "Rex does not use the orchid schedule to gloss over gummy plotting. Like the disciplines the sonneteer is bound by, the schedule is part of the framework he is committed to work within. The orchids and the orchid rooms sometimes are focal points in the stories. They are never irrelevant. In forty years Wolfe has scarcely ever shortened an orchid schedule."

"A dilly it was, this greenhouse", wrote Dr. John H. Vandermeulen in the American Orchid Society Bulletin.

Entering from the stairs via a vestibule, there were three main rooms—one for cattleyas, laelias, and hybrids; one for odontoglossums, oncidiums, miltonias, and their hybrids; and a tropical room (according to Fer-de-Lance). It must have been quite a sight with the angle-iron staging gleaming in its silver paint and on the concrete benches and shelves 10,000 pots of orchids in glorious, exultant bloom.

"If Wolfe had a favorite orchid, it would be the genus Phalaenopsis", Robert M. Hamilton wrote in his article, "The Orchidology of Nero Wolfe", first printed in The Gazette: Journal of the Wolfe Pack (Volume 1, Spring 1979). Phalaenopsis is mentioned in 11 Wolfe stories, and Phalaenopsis aphrodite is named in seven—more than any other species. (Note: Robert M. Hamilton lists all of the orchids mentioned in Archie's accounts in alphabetical order. He records Phalaenopsis aphrodite appearing in "Door to Death", The Golden Spiders, Plot It Yourself, "Poison à la Carte", A Right to Die, The Doorbell Rang and The Father Hunt.) Wolfe personally cuts his most treasured Phalaenopsis aphrodite for the centerpiece at the dinner for the Ten for Aristology in "Poison à la Carte". In The Father Hunt, after Dorothy Sebor provides the information that solves the case, Wolfe tells Archie, "We'll send her some sprays of Phalaenopsis Aphrodite. They have never been finer."

In the earlier works, Wolfe doesn't sell his orchids—"I do not sell orchids", Wolfe tells Archie in chapter 7 of Murder by the Book (1951). In The Silent Speaker (1946), Wolfe complains to Archie about the difficulty of the case, saying "I was an ass to undertake it. I have more Cattleyas than I have room for, and I could have sold five hundred of them for twelve thousand dollars." However, he does give them away. Four or five dozen are used to advance the investigation in Murder by the Book, and Wolfe refuses to let Archie bill the client for them. In The Final Deduction, Laelia purpurata and Dendrobium chrysotoxum are sent to Dr. Vollmer and his assistant, who shelter Wolfe and Archie when they have to flee the brownstone to avoid the police. As the series progresses, Wolfe seems to be more comfortable selling his orchids. In 1957's If Death Ever Slept (chapter 11), Archie describes Wolfe as "a practicing private detective with no other source of income except selling a few orchid plants now and then". By the time of Stout's short 1963 piece "Why Nero Wolfe Likes Orchids", Archie notes that Wolfe "hasn't bought a plant from a commercial grower for 10 years, but he sells some—a hundred or more a year."

In The Second Confession, the orchid rooms are torn apart by gunfire from across the street. The shooters are in the employ of crime boss Arnold Zeck, who wants Wolfe to drop a case that could lead back to him. Wolfe and Archie call men to take care of the plants and repair the windows before notifying the police.

=== Eccentricities ===
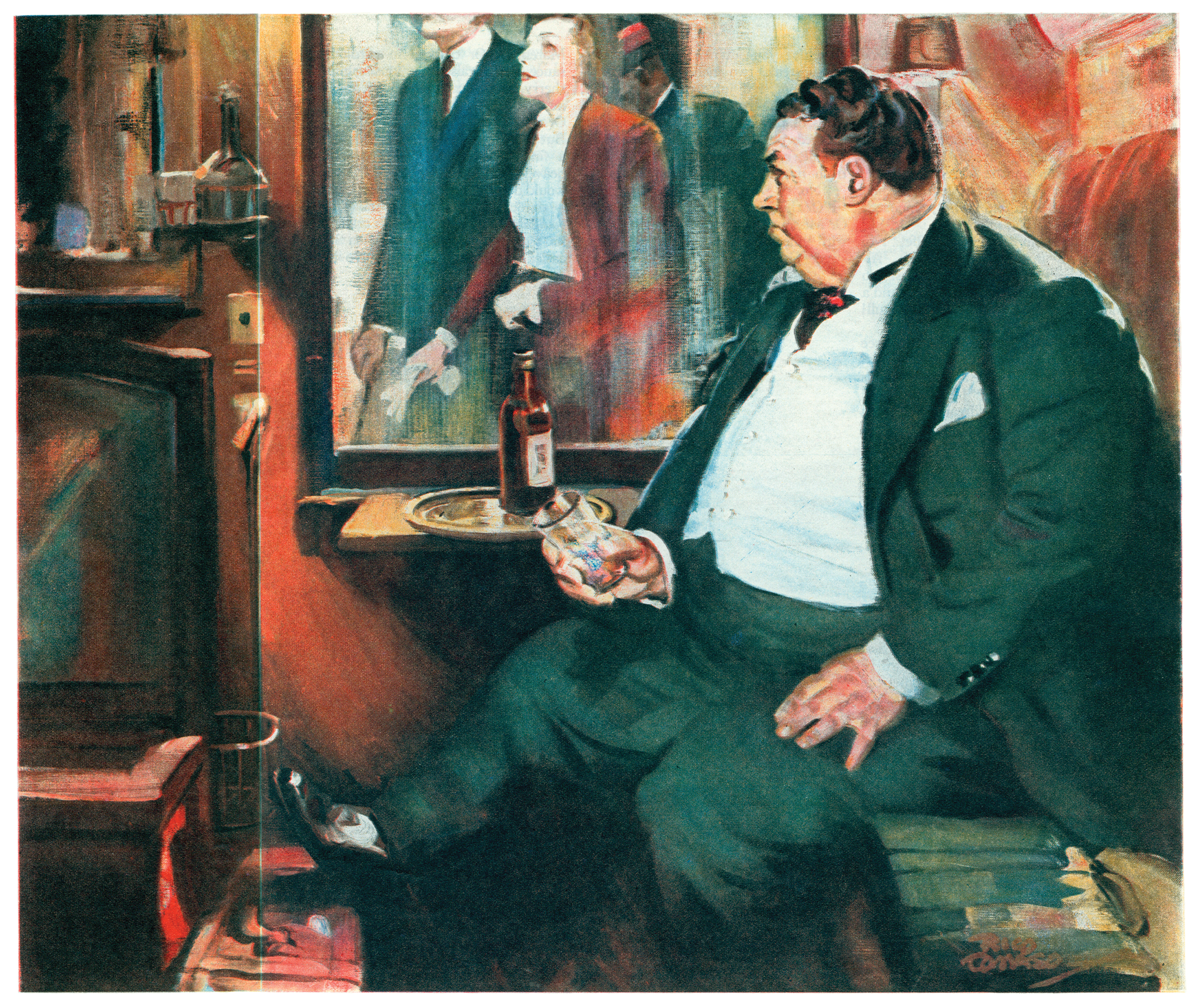
Wolfe suppresses his loathing of travel and trains in Too Many Cooks (illustration by Rico Tomaso for The American Magazine, March 1938).

I understand the technique of eccentricity; it would be futile for a man to labor at establishing a reputation for oddity if he were ready at the slightest provocation to revert to normal action.

— Nero Wolfe in Fer-de-Lance (1934), chapter 5

Wolfe has pronounced eccentricities and strict rules concerning his way of life. Their occasional violation adds spice to many of the stories.

Despite Wolfe's rule never to leave the brownstone on business, the stories find him leaving his home on several occasions. At times, Wolfe and Archie are on a personal errand when a murder occurs, and legal authorities require that they remain in the vicinity (Too Many Cooks, Some Buried Caesar, "Too Many Detectives" and "Immune to Murder", for example). In other instances, the requirements of the case force Wolfe from his house (In the Best Families, The Second Confession, The Doorbell Rang, Plot It Yourself, The Silent Speaker, Death of a Dude). Nevertheless, Wolfe is usually able to justify the travel associated with these cases as still being within the limits of his self-imposed "no leaving the house on business" rule, often by noting that there was a personal non-business related reason to make the journey. Although he occasionally ventures by car into the suburbs of New York City, he is loath to travel, and clutches the safety strap continually on the occasions that Archie drives him somewhere. He does not trust trains to start or to stop. (Note: And Be a Villain, chapter 10) As Archie says of Wolfe in The Doorbell Rang, "he distrusted all machines more complicated than a wheelbarrow." (Note: The Doorbell Rang, chapter 8) And yet, in In the Best Families, Wolfe displays no noticeable reticence whatsoever concerning travel in an automobile.

Wolfe maintains a rigid schedule in the brownstone. He has breakfast in his bedroom while wearing yellow silk pajamas; he hates to discuss work during breakfast, and if forced to do so insists upon not uttering a word until he has finished his glass of orange juice (Murder by the Book). Afterwards, he is with Horstmann in the plant rooms from 9 a.m. to 11 a.m. Lunch is usually at 1:15 p.m. He returns to the plant rooms from 4 p.m. to 6 p.m. Dinner is generally at 7:15 or 7:30 p.m. (although in one book, Wolfe tells a guest that lunch is served at 1 o'clock and dinner at 8). The remaining hours, 11 a.m. to 1 p.m., 2 p.m. to 4 p.m., and after dinner, are available for business, or for reading if there is no pressing business (even if, by Archie's lights, there is). Sunday's schedule is more relaxed; Theodore, the orchid-keeper, usually goes out.

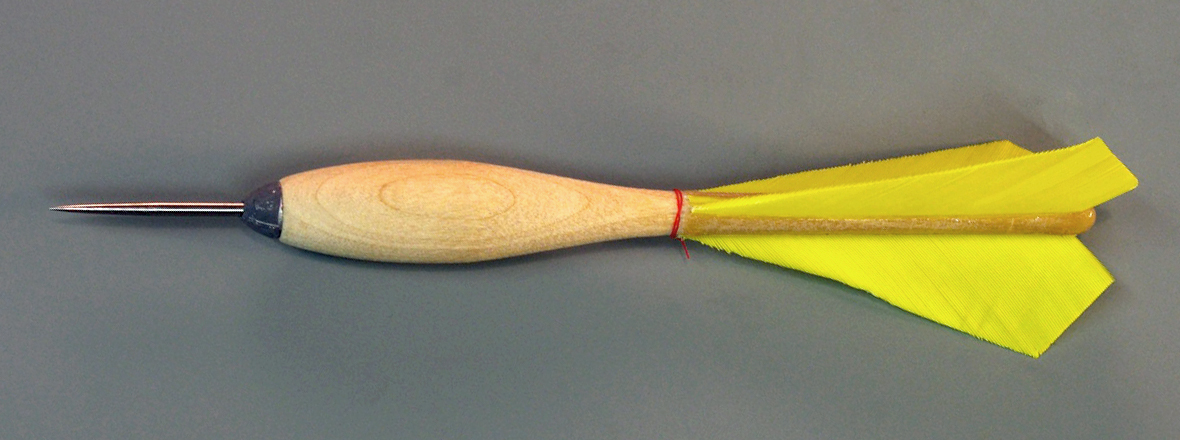
"He took his coat and vest off, exhibiting about eighteen square feet of canary-yellow shirt, and chose the darts with yellow feathers, which were his favorites." —Wolfe exercises in The Rubber Band, chapter 14

Wolfe is loath to exercise, but in The Rubber Band he is sufficiently concerned about his weight that he adds a workout to his daily routine. From 3:45 to 4 p.m., he throws yellow-feathered darts (which he calls "javelins") at a poker-dart board that Fritz hangs in the office. Archie joins him, using red-feathered darts, but quits when he loses nearly $100 to Wolfe in the first two months; he resumes playing only after Wolfe agrees to raise his salary. "There was no chance of getting any real accuracy with it, it was mostly luck", Archie writes. (Note: The Rubber Band, chapter 1) Other surprising examples of Wolfe's athleticism occur in "Not Quite Dead Enough" and The Black Mountain.

Wolfe does not invite people to use his first name and addresses them by honorific and surname. Aside from his employees, one of the only two men whom Wolfe addresses by their first names is his oldest friend, Marko Vukčić; Marko calls him Nero. (Note: "He was one of the only two men whom Wolfe called by their first names, apart from employees", Archie writes of Marko in Too Many Cooks, chapter 1. Sixteen years later, in The Black Mountain (chapter 1), Archie puts the number at ten.) In Death of a Doxy Julie Jaquette refers to Wolfe as Nero in a letter to Archie; and Lily Rowan has addressed Wolfe using an assumed first name. But these are exceptions. In "The Rodeo Murder" Wolfe finds it objectionable when Wade Eisler addresses him as Nero; and in "Door to Death" Sybil Pitcairn's disdainful use of his first name makes Wolfe decide to solve the case. Men nearly always address him as Wolfe, and women as Mr. Wolfe.

He is extremely fastidious about his clothing and hates to wear, even in private, anything that has been soiled. The short story "Eeny Meeny Murder Mo" opens with an example of this habit, in which Wolfe removes his necktie and leaves it on his desk after dropping a bit of sauce on it during lunch. The tie is later used to commit a murder in his office. Beyond that, Wolfe has a marked preference for the color yellow, habitually wearing shirts and silk pajamas in this color and sleeping on yellow bedsheets. (Note: "Help Wanted, Male", chapter 2)

He restricts his visible reactions: as Archie puts it, "He shook his head, moving it a full half-inch right and left, which was for him a frenzy of negation." (Note: "Instead of Evidence", chapter 1)

Wolfe states that "all music is a vestige of barbarism" and denies that music can have any intellectual content. (Note: The Father Hunt, chapter 12) He takes a dim view of television, but TV sets did find their way into the brownstone in the later stories. Archie notes in Before Midnight, "It was Sunday evening, when he especially enjoyed turning the television off." Wolfe's attitude toward television notwithstanding, the TV set in Fritz's basement quarters proved handy in The Doorbell Rang, when the volume was turned up to foil potential eavesdroppers. (Note: The Doorbell Rang, chapter 7)

Wolfe displays a pronounced, almost pathological, dislike for the company of women. Although some readers interpret this attitude as simple misogyny, various details in the stories, particularly the early ones, (Note: The League of Frightened Men, chapter 10) suggest it has more to do with an unfortunate encounter in early life with a femme fatale. It is not women themselves that he dislikes: rather, it is what he perceives as their frailties, especially a tendency to hysterics—to which he thinks every woman is prone. "In the all-male Wolfe household that is an apparent bulwark of men's-club solidarity, Wolfe's misogyny is part pose, part protection, but above all, a shrewd tool of detective strategy", wrote critic Molly Haskell. "Archie does the romancing while Wolfe prods and offends, winnowing out the traitorous and brattish women and allowing the cream, the really great women, to rise to the top. ... We deduce from the glow of those special women who do earn the detective's good will just how discriminating and interested an observer of womankind the author is." These women include Clara Fox (The Rubber Band), Lily Rowan (introduced in Some Buried Caesar), Phoebe Gunther (The Silent Speaker) and Julie Jaquette (Death of a Doxy). In The Rubber Band, Wolfe says, "It has been many years since any woman has slept under this roof. Not that I disapprove of them, except when they attempt to function as domestic animals. When they stick to the vocations for which they are best adapted, such as chicanery, sophistry, self-adornment, cajolery, mystification and incubation, they are sometimes splendid creatures."

That Wolfe disapproves of women is well established, but Archie claims that there are nuances: "The basic fact about a woman that seemed to irritate him was that she was a woman; the long record showed not a single exception; but from there on the documentation was cockeyed. If woman as woman grated on him you would suppose that the most womanly details would be the worst for him, but time and again I have known him to have a chair placed for a female so that his desk would not obstruct his view of her legs, and the answer can't be that his interest is professional and he reads character from legs, because the older and dumpier she is the less he cares where she sits. It is a very complex question and some day I'm going to take a whole chapter for it." (Note: The Silent Speaker, chapter 30)

Wolfe has an aversion to physical contact, even shaking hands. Early in the first novel Archie explains why there is a gong under his bed that will ring upon any intrusion into or near Wolfe's own bedroom: "Wolfe told me once ... that he really had no cowardice in him, he only had an intense distaste for being touched by anyone ..." (Note: In "Help Wanted, Male" Archie states that the gong was installed "... some years previously when Wolfe had got a knife stuck in him. The thing had never gone off except when we tested it ...") When Jerome Berin, creator of saucisse minuit, repeatedly taps Wolfe on the knee, Archie grins at "Wolfe, who didn't like being touched, concealing his squirm for the sake of sausages." (Note: Too Many Cooks, chapter 1) In Prisoner's Base, Wolfe speaks coldly as he tells the DA and Inspector Cramer that the despised Lieutenant Rowcliff "put a hand on me. ... I will not have a hand put on me, gentlemen. I like no man's hand on me, and one such as Mr. Rowcliff's, unmerited, I will not have." (Note: Prisoner's Base, chapter 6) Wolfe's prejudices make it all the more surprising when, in "Cordially Invited to Meet Death", Archie finds Wolfe in the kitchen with a woman who has solved the problem of preparing corned beef hash: "Standing beside him, closer to him than I had ever seen any woman or girl of any age tolerated, with her hand slipped between his arm and his bulk, was Maryella." (Note: "Cordially Invited to Meet Death", chapter 6)

Wolfe likes to solve the crossword puzzle of British newspapers in preference to those of American papers, and hates to be interrupted while so engaged. (Note: Archie most frequently mentions Wolfe working on the crossword puzzle in The Observer (Too Many Clients, chapter 10) and The Times (Murder by the Book, chapter 1).)

Wolfe is very particular in his choice of words. He is a prescriptivist who hates to hear language being misused according to his lights, often chastising people who do so. One example is his dislike of the word "contact" being used as a verb; when Johnny Keems says that "contact" is a verb, transitive and intransitive, Wolfe replies "Contact is not a verb under this roof". One of his most severe reactions occurs in the first chapter of Gambit, when he burns Webster's Third New International Dictionary in the front room fireplace because it states that the words "imply" and "infer" can be used interchangeably. Wolfe generally abhors slang (though in "Murder Is Corny" he says "There is good slang and bad slang") and expects Archie to avoid slang and other language he disapproves of when speaking to him. However, as with other worldly concerns, he sometimes relies on Archie's greater familiarity with slang when business demands it.

In nearly every story, Wolfe solves the mystery by considering the facts brought to him by Archie and others, and the replies to questions he himself asks of suspects. Wolfe ponders with his eyes closed, leaning back in his chair, breathing deeply and steadily, and pushing his lips in and out. Archie says that during these trances Wolfe reacts to nothing that is going on around him. Archie seldom interrupts Wolfe's thought processes, he says, largely because it is the only time that he can be sure that Wolfe is working.

=== Fictional entities ===
The books frequently mention brands that do not exist: for instance, Wolfe owns a Heron automobile, which Archie drives, and Wethersill automobiles are also mentioned. A Marley revolver (also Carley, in Die Like a Dog) is Archie's weapon of choice. A semi-fictional revolver brand is the Haskell (mentioned in A Right to Die). The Rabson lock likewise does not exist; the name was borrowed by Lawrence Block and used in his Bernie Rhodenbarr mysteries. Wolfe serves Remisier brandy or Follansbee's gin to guests and drinks Remmers' beer. Archie goes dancing at the Flamingo Club, which is now the name of more than one place in the New York City area, but the one in the books antedates them. Archie also frequently goes to Manhattan addresses that do not exist, for instance, 171 East 52nd Street in Might as Well Be Dead. Wolfe's address, as mentioned above, is also fictional.

(Stout initially used many real brands: Archie drives a Ford, carries a Colt pistol or revolver, and uses an Underwood typewriter. Stout was bothered when his stationer mentioned that, every time Stout mentioned Underwood's in a story, sales of that brand went up – and so switched to fictional brands. Ian Fleming, a fan of Stout, borrowed the technique for the James Bond novels, both fictional and real.)

On the other hand, real names and places also occur in the text, presumably for verisimilitude; Wolfe serves Bar-Le-Duc to a visitor on one occasion. The "Churchill Hotel" (officially the Hotel Churchill), mentioned many times, is a real hotel in Manhattan, and Sardi's is a real restaurant. Real people, for example, J. Edgar Hoover (notably in The Doorbell Rang), Walter Winchell and Texas Guinan are also mentioned.

== Narrator ==
If he had done nothing more than to create Archie Goodwin, Rex Stout would deserve the gratitude of whatever assessors watch over the prosperity of American literature. For surely Archie is one of the folk heroes in which the modern American temper can see itself transfigured. Archie is the lineal descendant of Huck Finn ... Archie is spiritually larger than life. That is why his employer and companion had to be made corpulent to match.

— Jacques Barzun

Archie Goodwin is the narrator of all the Nero Wolfe stories and a central character in them. Jacques Barzun and Wendell Hertig Taylor, critics and scholars of detective fiction, summarized the unique relationship between Wolfe and Archie:

First, Archie is not a friend but a paid employee, who acts as secretary, chauffeur, and legman to the mountainous and sedentary Wolfe. Then they differ in all important respects—age, background, physique, and education. Finally, it is impossible to say which is the more interesting and admirable of the two. They are complementary in the unheard-of ratio of 50–50. ... Archie has talents without which Wolfe would be lost: his remarkable memory, trained physical power, brash American humor, attractiveness to women, and ability to execute the most difficult errand virtually without instructions. Minus Archie, Wolfe would be a feckless recluse puttering in an old house on West 35th Street, New York.

Like Wolfe, Archie is a licensed private detective and handles all investigation that takes place outside the brownstone. He also takes care of routine tasks such as sorting the mail, taking dictation and answering the phone. At the time of the first novel, Fer-de-Lance, Archie had been working for Wolfe for seven years and had by then been trained by Wolfe in his preferred methods of investigation. Like Wolfe, he has developed an extraordinary memory and can recite verbatim conversations that go on for hours. But perhaps his most useful attribute is his ability to bring reluctant people to Wolfe for interrogation.

Archie's bedroom is one floor above Wolfe's, (Note: Archie's room is on the second floor in the first three novels: Fer-de-Lance (chapter 3), The League of Frightened Men (chapter 5) and The Rubber Band (chapter 8). In chapter 6 of Where There's a Will (1940), Archie's room is on the third floor, where it is in subsequent accounts. These include "Black Orchids" (chapter 6), "Cordially Invited to Meet Death" (chapter 3), "Not Quite Dead Enough" (chapter 3), "Booby Trap" (chapter 1), "Help Wanted, Male" (chapter 3), The Silent Speaker (chapter 19), "Before I Die" (chapters 10 and 11), Too Many Women (chapter 14) and "Omit Flowers" (chapter 8). In The Brownstone House of Nero Wolfe, Ken Darby attests that Archie stays put as "guardian of the third floor" from 1950 on (p. 59).) and his room and board at the brownstone are part of his compensation. On several occasions, he makes it a point to note that he owns his bedroom furniture. Except for breakfast (which chef Fritz Brenner generally serves him in the kitchen), Archie takes his meals at Wolfe's table, and has learned much about haute cuisine by listening to Wolfe and Fritz discuss food. While Archie has a cocktail on occasion, his beverage of choice is milk.

Archie has frequent reason to note that he needs at least eight hours' sleep each night, and prefers more. He reacts bitterly when his sleep is interrupted or otherwise shortened by events, such as late-night interrogations at Homicide headquarters or a precinct, or a 1:45 a.m. phone call from a client who has lost her keys, or driving a suspect to her home in Carmel and returning to Manhattan at 2:30 a.m.

Archie's initial rough edges become smoother across the decades, much as American norms evolved over the years. Noting Archie's colloquialisms in the first two Nero Wolfe novels, Rev. Frederick G. Gotwald wrote, "The crudeness of these references makes me suspect that Stout uses them in Archie to show their ugliness because he uses them unapologetically." (Note: "I believe Stout uses such crude statements to have us feel how objectionable they are", Gotwald wrote, adding that Archie's ethnic slur in chapter 2 of Fer-de-Lance was sanitized in paperback editions.) In the first Wolfe novel, Archie uses a racially biased term, for which Wolfe chides him, (Note: But the admonition apparently did not take hold. In Too Many Cooks, Wolfe questions a group of black men. Archie's opinion, voiced using racial epithets, is that interviewing them will be a waste of time, but Wolfe's candor and respect gains him the men's trust. The session ends at 4:30 a.m. and Wolfe instructs Archie to telephone the (white) district attorney. Again Archie objects, suggesting that Wolfe should wait until later that day. Wolfe calmly says: "Archie, please. You tried to instruct me how to handle colored men. Will you try it with white men too?") but by the time that A Right to Die was published in 1964, racial epithets were mostly used by Stout's antagonistic characters.

Many reviewers and critics regard Archie Goodwin as the true protagonist of the Nero Wolfe corpus. Compared to Wolfe, Archie is the man of action, tough and street smart. His narrative style is breezy and vivid. Some commentators see this as a conscious device by Stout to fuse the hard school of Dashiell Hammett's Sam Spade with the urbanity of Sherlock Holmes or Agatha Christie's Hercule Poirot. (Note: Another fictional creation by Stout, the solo operative Tecumseh Fox, who is perhaps a fusion of the best qualities of Wolfe and Goodwin into a single person without Wolfe's collection of idiosyncrasies, is arguably a better and more effective fictional character, as in the novel The Broken Vase. That book, however, was not a commercial success, and only three books featuring Fox were written, one of which was later used as the basis for a Wolfe story at the urging of Stout's publisher.) But there is no doubt that Archie was an important addition to the genre of detective fiction. Previously, foils such as Dr. Watson or Arthur Hastings were employed as confidants and narrators, but none had such a fully developed personality or was such an integral part of the plot as Archie.

== Supporting characters ==
=== Household ===
- Fritz Brenner – exceptionally talented Swiss cook who prepares and serves all of Wolfe's meals except those that Wolfe occasionally takes at Rusterman's Restaurant. Fritz also acts as the household's majordomo and butler.
- Theodore Horstmann – orchid expert who assists Wolfe in the plant rooms.

=== The 'Teers ===
- Saul Panzer – top-notch private detective who is frequently hired by Nero Wolfe either to assist Archie Goodwin, or to carry out assignments Wolfe prefers that Archie not know about. Archie often comments on Saul's exceptional memory, especially his talent for recalling people's faces.
- Fred Durkin – blue-collar investigator who is often hired for mundane tasks like surveillance.
- Orrie Cather – handsome, personable detective who thinks he would look just fine sitting at Archie's desk.

=== Law enforcement officials ===
- Inspector Cramer – head of Homicide in Manhattan. In some of the stories it is implied that his authority extends to other NYC boroughs.
- Sergeant Purley Stebbins – assistant to Cramer.
- Lieutenant George Rowcliff – obnoxious police lieutenant (who has been known to stutter when frustrated by Goodwin). Plays an integral part in Please Pass the Guilt.
- Hombert – in some of the novels the New York police commissioner (Note: In The Rubber Band (1936) Wolfe displays great respect (if not always cooperation) towards Cramer, but thinks Hombert "should go back to diapers"—an opinion indirectly shared by Cramer himself who points out that Hombert is a politician and not a policeman. In The Silent Speaker, Wolfe gets a chance to humiliate Hombert and help Cramer in the process.)
- Skinner – New York County Manhattan District Attorney
- Mandelbaum (aka Mandel) – Manhattan Assistant District Attorney.
- Cleveland Archer – Westchester County district attorney
- Ben Dykes – head of Westchester County detectives
- Con Noonan – lieutenant with the New York State Police. He dislikes Wolfe and Goodwin and would lock them up on the feeblest excuse (see the novella "Door to Death").

=== Friends ===
- Lon Cohen – of the New York Gazette, Archie's pipeline to breaking crime news. Lon apparently has no official title at the Gazette but occupies a room just two doors down from the publisher's corner office. Archie frequently asks Lon for background information on current or prospective clients, and returns those favors by providing Lon exclusives, and occasional photos, concerning Wolfe's cases. Lon is also one of Archie's poker-playing pals.
- Lily Rowan – heiress and socialite, often appears as Archie's romantic companion, although both Lily and Archie are fiercely independent and have no intention of getting engaged or settling down. (It is implied that they enjoy an intimate, ongoing but nonexclusive relationship.) Lily was introduced in Some Buried Caesar, appears in several stories (and is mentioned in passing in others), and assists in a couple of cases.
- Marko Vukčić – A fellow Montenegrin whom Wolfe has known since childhood, possibly a blood relative (since "vuk" means "wolf"). Vukčić owns the high-class Rusterman's Restaurant in Manhattan. According to In the Best Families (in which Wolfe gives him power of attorney), he is the only man in New York who calls Wolfe by his first name. Wolfe is executor of Vukčić's will and, following Vukčić's death, runs Rusterman's as a trustee for "a couple of years".
- Lewis Hewitt – well-heeled orchid fancier, for whom Wolfe did a favor (as told in "Black Orchids"). During a prolonged absence (In the Best Families), Wolfe sends his orchids to Hewitt for care. Wolfe occasionally asks professional favors of Hewitt (as in The Doorbell Rang), and Hewitt has sent at least one friend, Millard Bynoe, to ask Wolfe's assistance ("Easter Parade").
- Nathaniel Parker – Wolfe's lawyer (or occasionally a client's lawyer, on Wolfe's recommendation) when only a lawyer will do. The character name evolved from "Henry H. Barber"; in Prisoner's Base (1952) the lawyer's name is Nathaniel Parker, but in The Golden Spiders (1953) it's Henry Parker, and then reverts to Nathaniel Parker for the rest of the series. Parker is an old friend, and has a broad scope of interests: e.g., Parker converses with Wolfe in French, in "Immune to Murder".
- Doctor Vollmer – a medical doctor who is Wolfe's neighbor and friend. Wolfe calls upon Vollmer whenever a dead body is discovered, or medical attention is required, at the brownstone. In The Silent Speaker, Vollmer contrives an illness severe enough that Wolfe cannot be questioned or even seen by anyone. Vollmer examines Louis Rony's corpse for Wolfe in The Second Confession and acts as a go-between for Cramer and Archie in The Doorbell Rang. Vollmer's motivation, aside from friendship, is that Wolfe helped him out with a would-be blackmailer years ago. Vollmer's house (or perhaps Wolfe's) moves along 35th Street from time to time. In chapter 5 of Before Midnight the houses are said to be thirty yards apart; in chapter 6 of The Final Deduction the distance is sixty yards; and in chapter 2 of "Disguise for Murder" the distance is two hundred yards. "Cordially Invited to Meet Death" is less specific, placing the houses "on the same block".
- Carla Lovchen – Wolfe's adopted daughter, who appears in only two stories, Over My Dead Body and The Black Mountain. (Note: Wolfe receives news of her death in the latter. "Lovchen" is not a family name; rather, it is the name of the black mountain from which Montenegro gets its name.)

=== Other associates ===
- Bill Gore – freelance operative occasionally called in when Wolfe requires additional help in the field.
- Johnny Keems – freelance operative occasionally called in by Wolfe. He makes his last appearance in the novel Might as Well Be Dead.
- Theodolinda (Dol) Bonner and Sally Corbett (aka Sally Colt) (Note: Wolfe and Archie first meet Sally Colt, later Corbett, in "Too Many Detectives" (1956), chapter 1, when they are summoned to Albany for questioning about wiretapping activities. Archie starts his report by stating, "I am against female detectives on principle." Still Sally Colt, she is again called on to help out in If Death Ever Slept (1957), chapter 17. In Plot It Yourself (1959), chapter 19, it is a Sally Corbett, not Colt, who helps out on Wolfe's case. "Sally Corbett was one of the two women who, a couple of years back, had made me feel that there might be some flaw in my attitude toward female dicks." Sally Colt/Corbett makes a final appearance in The Mother Hunt (1963), chapter 12. Archie remarks again that Sally and Dol had made him change his attitude about female detectives.) – female operatives whom Wolfe employs at need. They also play a major role in the novella "Too Many Detectives". Dol Bonner is the principal character in the novel The Hand in the Glove, which is an early example of a woman private detective as the protagonist of a mystery novel. Dol Bonner and her agency operatives appear in a few Wolfe mysteries in places where female operatives are required, such as The Mother Hunt (also one of the few stories where Wolfe has to flee his home to escape arrest).
- Del Bascom – independent investigator who runs a large conventional detective agency in Manhattan. Wolfe sometimes subcontracts to Bascom when he needs a lot of men for something (as in The Silent Speaker).
- Herb Aronson and Al Goller – friendly cabbies who make themselves available to Archie for mobile surveillance jobs.
- Ethelbert Hitchcock – Wolfe's contact in London who handles enquiries to be made in Europe. Although he is usually identified by only his surname, in The Rubber Band (chapter 10) Archie refers to him as Ethelbert Hitchcock, "which I consider the all-time low for a name for a snoop, even in England." Wolfe also identifies him by that full name when speaking to FBI investigator Stahl in Over My Dead Body (chapter 15). Some years later, in The Black Mountain (chapter 4), it is Geoffrey Hitchcock who meets Wolfe and Archie at the airport.
- Felix Courbet – Part owner and manager of Rusterman's Restaurant following the death of Marko Vukčić. Felix plays a major role in both "Poison à la Carte" and A Family Affair, in which his surname is changed to Mauer. In The Black Mountain his surname is Martin.

== Bibliography ==
He passes the supreme test of being rereadable. I don't know how many times I have reread the Wolfe stories, but plenty. I know exactly what is coming and how it is all going to end, but it doesn't matter. That's writing.

— P. G. Wodehouse

=== Books by Rex Stout ===
Rex Stout's Nero Wolfe books (novels and novella/short story collections) are listed below in order of publication. For specific publication history, including original magazine appearances, see entries for individual titles. Years link to year-in-literature articles.

- 1934: Fer-de-Lance
- 1935: The League of Frightened Men
- 1936: The Rubber Band
- 1937: The Red Box
- 1938: Too Many Cooks
- 1939: Some Buried Caesar
- 1940: Over My Dead Body
- 1940: Where There's a Will
- 1942: Black Orchids (contains "Black Orchids" and "Cordially Invited to Meet Death")
- 1944: Not Quite Dead Enough (contains "Not Quite Dead Enough" and "Booby Trap")
- 1946: The Silent Speaker
- 1947: Too Many Women
- 1948: And Be a Villain (British title More Deaths Than One)
- 1949: Trouble in Triplicate (contains "Before I Die", "Help Wanted, Male" and "Instead of Evidence")
- 1949: The Second Confession
- 1950: Three Doors to Death (contains "Man Alive", "Omit Flowers" and "Door to Death")
- 1950: In the Best Families (British title Even in the Best Families)
- 1951: Curtains for Three (contains "The Gun with Wings", "Bullet for One" and "Disguise for Murder")
- 1951: Murder by the Book
- 1952: Triple Jeopardy (contains "Home to Roost", "The Cop-Killer" and "The Squirt and the Monkey")
- 1952: Prisoner's Base (British title Out Goes She)
- 1953: The Golden Spiders
- 1954: Three Men Out (contains "Invitation to Murder", "The Zero Clue" and "This Won't Kill You")
- 1954: The Black Mountain
- 1955: Before Midnight
- 1956: Three Witnesses (contains "The Next Witness", "When a Man Murders" and "Die Like a Dog")
- 1956: Might as Well Be Dead
- 1957: Three for the Chair (contains "A Window for Death", "Immune to Murder" and "Too Many Detectives")
- 1957: If Death Ever Slept
- 1958: And Four to Go (contains "Christmas Party", "Easter Parade", "Fourth of July Picnic" and "Murder Is No Joke")
- 1958: Champagne for One
- 1959: Plot It Yourself (British title Murder in Style)
- 1960: Three at Wolfe's Door (contains "Poison à la Carte", "Method Three for Murder" and "The Rodeo Murder")
- 1960: Too Many Clients
- 1961: The Final Deduction
- 1962: Homicide Trinity (contains "Eeny Meeny Murder Mo", "Death of a Demon" and "Counterfeit for Murder")
- 1962: Gambit
- 1963: The Mother Hunt
- 1964: Trio for Blunt Instruments (contains "Kill Now—Pay Later", "Murder Is Corny" and "Blood Will Tell")
- 1964: A Right to Die
- 1965: The Doorbell Rang
- 1966: Death of a Doxy
- 1968: The Father Hunt
- 1969: Death of a Dude
- 1973: Please Pass the Guilt
- 1975: A Family Affair
- 1985: Death Times Three (posthumous; contains "Bitter End", "Frame-Up for Murder" and "Assault on a Brownstone")

=== Other authors of Nero Wolfe stories ===
How would you feel if someone wanted to continue the Wolfe series after you laid aside your pen?
I don't know whether vampirism or cannibalism is the better term for it. Not nice. They should roll their own.

— Rex Stout, interviewed by biographer John J. McAleer

==== Robert Goldsborough ====
After the death of Rex Stout's widow in October 1984, the Stout estate approved the continuation of the Nero Wolfe series. In 1986 journalist Robert Goldsborough published the first of seven Nero Wolfe mysteries issued by Bantam Books. Goldsborough's approach was faithful to the Rex Stout works, but he added his own touches, including an updated frame of reference (Archie now uses a personal computer to file Wolfe's germination records; Wolfe's ancient elevator is finally replaced by a more efficient model; etc.). Goldsborough's first effort, Murder in E Minor, was published in 1986. Goldsborough often drew on his own background in advertising, education and journalism for color and detail.

- 1986: Murder in E Minor – Wolfe comes out of self-imposed retirement to investigate the death of a boyhood friend, who became a famous symphony conductor.
- 1987: Death on Deadline – Wolfe intervenes when his favorite newspaper is about to be taken over by a muck-raking publisher.
- 1988: The Bloodied Ivy – Murder on the college campus, mingled with the attractions and pitfalls of having dedicated groupies as graduate students.
- 1989: The Last Coincidence – The fallout of the alleged date rape of Lily Rowan's niece.
- 1990: Fade to Black – Dirty work at an advertising agency.
- 1992: Silver Spire – Behind-the-scenes intrigue at a successful televangelism ministry based in Staten Island.
- 1994: The Missing Chapter – In retrospect, the author's explicit farewell to Nero Wolfe: the story concerns the murder of a mediocre continuator of a popular detective series.

Goldsborough resumed the series in 2012 with Archie Meets Nero Wolfe, a prequel to Stout's novels. The books are published by the Mysterious Press.

- 2012: Archie Meets Nero Wolfe – A prequel imagining how Nero Wolfe and Archie Goodwin met and became a team.
- 2014: Murder in the Ballpark – Nero and Archie investigate the murder of a state senator at a baseball game at the Polo Grounds.
- 2015: Archie in the Crosshairs
- 2016: Stop the Presses!
- 2017: Murder, Stage Left
- 2018: The Battered Badge
- 2019: Death of an Art Collector
- 2020: Archie Goes Home
- 2021: Trouble at the Brownstone
- 2023: The Missing Heiress
- 2025: The White Mountain

==== Other pastiches ====
- Maurice Richardson's "The Last Detective Story in the World" (1946) is a Sherlock Holmes pastiche in which Nero Wolfe appears along with many other detectives and villains from crime fiction history. First printed in the May 1946 issue of the British magazine Liliput, the story was reprinted in Ellery Queen's Mystery Magazine (February 1947).
- Viola Brothers Shore wrote a parody titled "A Case of Facsimile" (1948) in which Nerissa Wolfe, Samantha Spade and Elsie Queen assist Shirley Holmes in solving a mystery. The story appeared in the October 1948 issue of Ellery Queen's Mystery Magazine.
- Thomas Narcejac included a pastiche of Rex Stout's Nero Wolfe titled The Red Orchid (L'orchidee rouge) in his collection Faux et usage de Faux (Librairie des Champs-Elysées 1952). The story was translated by Lawrence G. Blochman for the January 1961 issue of Ellery Queen's Mystery Magazine.
- Marion Mainwaring's 1954 novel Murder in Pastiche parodies nine famous fictional detectives, including Nero Wolfe (as "Trajan Beare").
- Randall Garrett's Lord Darcy novel Too Many Magicians (1966) includes an appearance by the Marquis of London, a fat genius who looks and talks like Nero Wolfe, never leaves home, and is intensely interested in his hybridized plants. He has an assistant, Lord Bontriomphe (a literal French translation of "Goodwin"), who is first seen examining an exhibition of plants (like Archie in "Black Orchids"), and a cook corresponding to Fritz Brenner. The title pays homage to that of many Nero Wolfe stories, from Too Many Cooks (1938) to Too Many Clients (1960).
- Gene Wolfe's short story "The Rubber Bend" (originally published in Universe 5 (1974), edited by Terry Carr; later reprinted in the Wolfe collection Storeys from the Old Hotel) is a pastiche of both Sherlock Holmes and Nero Wolfe stories. A robot named "Noel Wide" stands in for Wolfe; his companion, another robot, is named "Arch St. Louis".
- Lawrence Block's Make Out with Murder (1974) and The Topless Tulip Caper (1975) are tongue-in-cheek mystery novels in which wisecracking narrator Chip Harrison is assistant to Leo Haig, a fat detective who explicitly emulates Nero Wolfe (raising tropical fish instead of orchids in his Manhattan brownstone). Block revisited the characters in "As Dark as Christmas Gets" (1997), a short story commissioned by Otto Penzler and collected in Christmas at The Mysterious Bookshop (2010).
- Julian Symons's Great Detectives: Seven Original Investigations (1981) includes his story "In Which Archie Goodwin Remembers". The author's interview with Archie Goodwin in retirement is illustrated by Tom Adams.
- John Lescroart places numerous clues in his novels Son of Holmes (1986) and Rasputin's Revenge (1987) to suggest that the main character, Auguste Lupa (the son of Sherlock Holmes and Irene Adler), later becomes Nero Wolfe.
- David Langford wrote the short story "If Looks Could Kill" for the Midnight Rose anthology EuroTemps (1992), featuring the Wolfe pastiche Caligula Foxe, a London-based detective in a world where some people have paranormal abilities, although Foxe is offended by any suggestion his own deductive skills might qualify as such. Like Wolfe, Foxe seldom leaves his home (an "old house in Westbourne Terrace") and is prone to "relapses". He cultivates paranormal saprophytes. The story is narrated by his legman Charlie Goodman, and other characters include their chef Franz, fellow detectives Paul Sanza, Terry Carver and Sally Cole, and Government official Mr Cream (a near-anagram of Cramer). In the collection of Langford pastiches He Do the Time Police in Different Voices, "If Looks Could Kill" is credited to "R*x St**t".
- William L. DeAndrea's Written in Fire (1995), a historical mystery set in the Old West, features frontier lawman Lewis "Lobo" Blacke. Using a wheelchair after he is shot in the back, Blacke takes over a newspaper and is assisted by reporter Quinn Booker, who becomes his biographer. DeAndrea completed a sequel, Fatal Elixir (1997), published posthumously.
- Loren D. Estleman created the rotund amateur detective Claudius Lyon, who is so obsessed with Nero Wolfe's style of life that he duplicates it with just enough of a difference that his idol will not be entitled to take legal action. Ex-con Arnie Woodbine narrates the comic stories (printed in Ellery Queen's Mystery Magazine), which include "Who's Afraid of Nero Wolfe?" (June 2008), "The Boy Who Cried Wolfe" (September–October 2008) and "Wolfe at the Door" (February 2009).
- Dave Duncan wrote the Venice Trilogy (2007–2009), starring the legendary clairvoyant, astrologer, and physician Maestro Nostradamus, who solves mysteries for the rulers of Venice, Italy while never leaving his apartments. Instead he sends the young swordsman Alfeo Zeno on various investigative tasks around the city, seeking clues, arranging interviews, and generally stirring up trouble until something happens. Nostradamus holds a similar disdain for women, and Alfeo's primary romantic partner is a highly-ranked courtesan, similar in station to Lily Rowan (an independent socialite).
- Dave Zeltserman's series of Julius Katz mystery stories and novellas, described as a Nero Wolfe pastiche that "evidences some similarities to Rex Stout's detective pair, Nero & Archie", are frequently published in Ellery Queen’s Mystery Magazine and Alfred Hitchcock Mystery Magazine. These stories are narrated by Boston PI Julius Katz’s equivalent of Nero Wolfe’s Archie Goodwin, a "highly advanced AI software housed in a device that looks like a tie clip".

=== Books about Rex Stout and Nero Wolfe ===
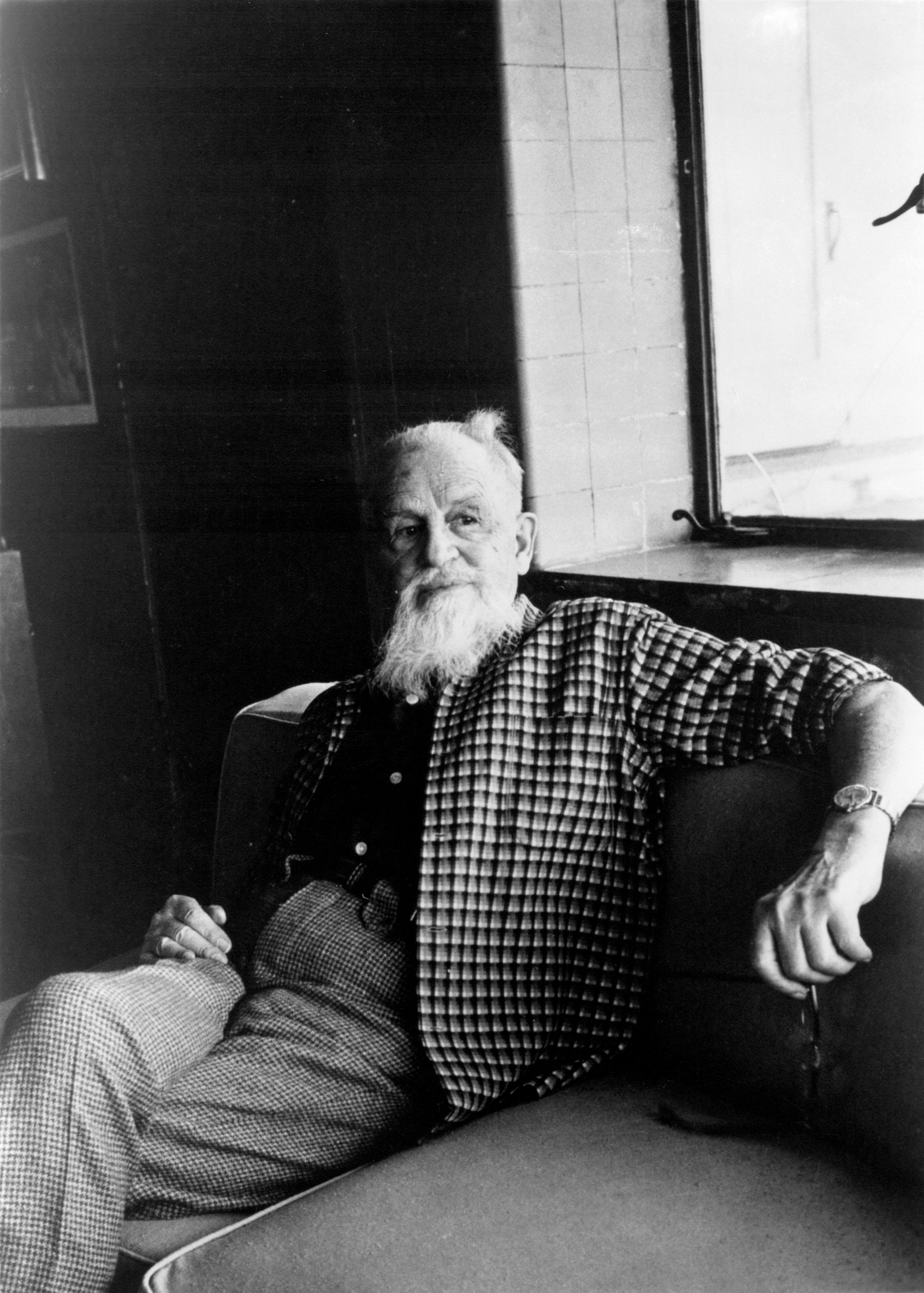
Rex Stout in 1973

- Anderson, David R., Rex Stout (1984, Frederick Ungar; Hardcover ISBN 0-8044-2005-X / Paperback ISBN 0-8044-6009-4). Study of the Nero Wolfe series.
- Baring-Gould, William S., Nero Wolfe of West Thirty-fifth Street (1969, Viking Press; ISBN 0-14-006194-0). Fanciful biography. Reviewed in Time, March 21, 1969 ("The American Holmes").
- Bourne, Michael, Corsage: A Bouquet of Rex Stout and Nero Wolfe (1977, James A. Rock & Co., Publishers; Hardcover ISBN 0-918736-00-5 / Paperback ISBN 0-918736-01-3). Posthumous collection produced in a numbered limited edition of 276 hardcovers and 1,500 softcovers. Shortly before his death Rex Stout authorized the editor to include the first Nero Wolfe novella, "Bitter End" (1940), which had not been republished in his own novella collections. Corsage also includes an interview Bourne conducted with Stout (July 18, 1973; also available on audiocassette tape), and concludes with the first and only book publication of "Why Nero Wolfe Likes Orchids", an article by Rex Stout that first appeared in Life (April 19, 1963).
- Darby, Ken, The Brownstone House of Nero Wolfe (1983, Little, Brown and Company; ISBN 0-316-17280-4). Biography of the brownstone "as told by Archie Goodwin". Includes detailed floor plans.
- Gotwald, Rev. Frederick G., The Nero Wolfe Handbook (1985; revised 1992, 2000). Self-published anthology of essays edited by a longtime member of The Wolfe Pack.
- Kaye, Marvin, The Archie Goodwin Files (2005, Wildside Press; ISBN 1-55742-484-5). Selected articles from The Wolfe Pack publication The Gazette, edited by a charter member.
- Kaye, Marvin, The Nero Wolfe Files (2005, Wildside Press; ISBN 0-8095-4494-6). Selected articles from The Wolfe Pack publication The Gazette, edited by a charter member.
- McAleer, John, Rex Stout: A Biography (1977, Little, Brown and Company; ISBN 0-316-55340-9). Foreword by P.G. Wodehouse. Winner of the Mystery Writers of America's Edgar Award for Best Critical/Biographical Work in 1978. Reissued as Rex Stout: A Majesty's Life (2002, James A. Rock & Co., Publishers; Hardcover ISBN 0-918736-43-9 / Paperback ISBN 0-918736-44-7).
- McAleer, John, Royal Decree: Conversations with Rex Stout (1983, Pontes Press, Ashton, MD). Published in a numbered limited edition of 1,000 copies.
- McBride, O.E., Stout Fellow: A Guide Through Nero Wolfe's World (2003, iUniverse; Hardcover ISBN 0-595-65716-8 / Paperback ISBN 0-595-27861-2). Pseudonymous self-published homage.
- Mitgang, Herbert, Dangerous Dossiers: Exposing the Secret War Against America's Greatest Authors (1988, Donald I. Fine, Inc.; ISBN 1-55611-077-4). Chapter 10 is titled "Seeing Red: Rex Stout".
- Ruaud, A.F., Les Nombreuses vies de Nero Wolfe (French: "The Many Lives of Nero Wolfe") (2008, Moutons électriques (France); ISBN 978-2-915793-51-2). Biography of the character, essays and biblio-filmographies.
- Symons, Julian, Great Detectives: Seven Original Investigations (1981, Abrams; ISBN 0-8109-0978-2). Illustrated by Tom Adams. "We quiz Archie Goodwin in his den and gain a clue to the ultimate fate of Nero Wolfe" in a chapter titled "In Which Archie Goodwin Remembers".
- Townsend, Guy M., Rex Stout: An Annotated Primary and Secondary Bibliography (1980, Garland Publishing; ISBN 0-8240-9479-4). Associate editors John McAleer, Judson Sapp and Arriean Schemer. Definitive publication history.
- Van Dover, J. Kenneth, At Wolfe's Door: The Nero Wolfe Novels of Rex Stout (1991, Borgo Press, Milford Series; second edition 2003, James A. Rock & Co., Publishers; Hardcover ISBN 0-918736-51-X / Paperback ISBN 0-918736-52-8). Bibliography, reviews and essays.

== Reception and influence ==
=== Awards and recognition ===
- In his seminal 1941 work, Murder for Pleasure, crime fiction historian Howard Haycraft included Fer-de-Lance and The League of Frightened Men in his definitive list of the most influential works of mystery fiction.
- The Nero Wolfe corpus was nominated Best Mystery Series of the Century at Bouchercon 2000, the world's largest mystery convention, and Rex Stout was nominated Best Mystery Writer of the Century. (Note: Agatha Christie's Hercule Poirot was named Best Mystery Series of the Century at Bouchercon 2000. Agatha Christie was voted Best Mystery Writer of the Century; the other nominees were Raymond Chandler, Dashiell Hammett, Dorothy Sayers, and Rex Stout. The 31st World Mystery Convention was presented in Denver September 7–10, 2000.)

=== Cultural references ===
Wolfe, as he appeared in volume 17 of Detective Conan

- Nero Wolfe is one of 12 famous fictional detectives depicted in a set of Nicaraguan postage stamps issued in November 1972 to commemorate the 50th anniversary of Interpol.
- "A number of the paintings of René Magritte (1898–1967), the internationally famous Belgian painter, are named after titles of books by Rex Stout", wrote the artist's attorney and friend Harry Torczyner. (Note: "We know the importance granted to the words by Magritte in his paintings and we know the impact that literary works such as Poe's, Rex Stout's or Mallarmé's had on him", wrote the Magritte Museum.) "He read Hegel, Heidegger and Sartre, as well as Dashiell Hammett, Rex Stout and Georges Simenon", the Times Higher Education Supplement wrote of Magritte. "Some of his best titles were 'found' in this way." Magritte's 1942 painting, Les compagnons de la peur ("The Companions of Fear"), bears the title given to The League of Frightened Men (1935) when it was published in France by Gallimard (1939). It is one of Magritte's series of "leaf-bird" paintings. Created during the Nazi occupation of Brussels, it depicts a stormy, mountainous landscape in which a cluster of plants has metamorphosed into a group of vigilant owls.
- The newspaper comic strip Nero Wolfe appeared from 1956 to 1972, originally written by France Herron and drawn by Mike Roy, and syndicated by Columbia Features.
- Nero Wolfe is referred to in Ian Fleming's book On Her Majesty's Secret Service (1963), by the character M while in conversation with James Bond who acknowledges that he is a fan.
- Nero Wolfe is a character who appears in George Alec Effinger's book When Gravity Fails (1986), along with the character of James Bond.
- Nero Wolfe is highlighted in volume 17 of the Detective Conan manga edition of Gosho Aoyama's Mystery Library, a section of the graphic novels in which the author introduces a different detective (or occasionally, a villain) from mystery literature, television or other media.
- Nobel Prize-winning poet Louise Glück writes of Nero Wolfe in her poem "The Mystery", from her collection Vita Nova (1999).

== Adaptations ==
=== Film ===
After the publication of Fer-de-Lance in 1934, several Hollywood studios were interested in the movie rights. In one of many conversations with his authorized biographer, Rex Stout told John McAleer that he himself had wanted Charles Laughton to play Nero Wolfe:

I met Laughton only once, at a party. Of all the actors I have seen, I think he would have come closest to doing Nero Wolfe perfectly. A motion picture producer (I forget who) asked him to do a series of Nero Wolfe movies, and he had said he would agree to do one but would not commit himself to a series.

In 1974 McAleer interviewed Laughton's widow, Elsa Lanchester. "I seem to remember Charles being very interested in the character of Nero Wolfe," she told him. "I always regretted I did not get to play Dora Chapin." (Note: Dora Chapin is the wife of the man feared by the members of The League of Frightened Men; much of the novel's plot hinges on her activities.)

"When Columbia pictures bought the screen rights to Fer-de-Lance for $7,500 and secured the option to buy further stories in the series, it was thought the role would go to Walter Connolly. Instead Edward Arnold got it", McAleer reported in Rex Stout: A Biography. "Columbia's idea was to keep Arnold busy with low-cost Wolfe films between features. Two films presently were made by Columbia, Meet Nero Wolfe (Fer-de-Lance) and The League of Frightened Men. Connolly did portray Wolfe in the latter film, after Arnold decided he did not want to become identified in the public mind with one part. Lionel Stander portrayed Archie Goodwin. Stander was a capable actor but, as Archie, Rex thought he had been miscast."

==== Meet Nero Wolfe ====
Columbia Pictures adapted the first Nero Wolfe novel, Fer-de-Lance, for the screen in 1936. Meet Nero Wolfe was directed by Herbert Biberman, and featured a cast led by Edward Arnold as Nero Wolfe, and Lionel Stander as Archie Goodwin. A young Rita Hayworth (then Rita Cansino) portrays Maria Maringola, who sets the story in motion when she asks for Wolfe's help in finding her missing brother, Carlo.

"Meet Nero Wolfe is an above average minor A picture, a solid mystery, and unfailingly entertaining", reported Scarlet Street magazine in 2002 when it revisited the film. "No, at bottom, it's not Rex Stout's Nero and Archie, but it's a well-developed mystery (thanks to Stout's plot) with compensations all its own—and an interesting piece of Wolfeana."

==== The League of Frightened Men ====
In 1937, Columbia Pictures released The League of Frightened Men, its adaptation of the second Nero Wolfe novel. Lionel Stander reprised his role as Archie Goodwin, and Walter Connolly took over the role of Nero Wolfe.

"He drinks beer in the novel but hot chocolate in the picture. That's the best explanation of what's wrong with the film", wrote Variety (June 16, 1937).

After The League of Frightened Men, Rex Stout declined to authorize any more Hollywood adaptations. "Do you think there's any chance of Hollywood ever making a good Nero Wolfe movie?" biographer John McAleer asked the author. Stout replied, "I don't know. I suppose so."

=== Radio ===
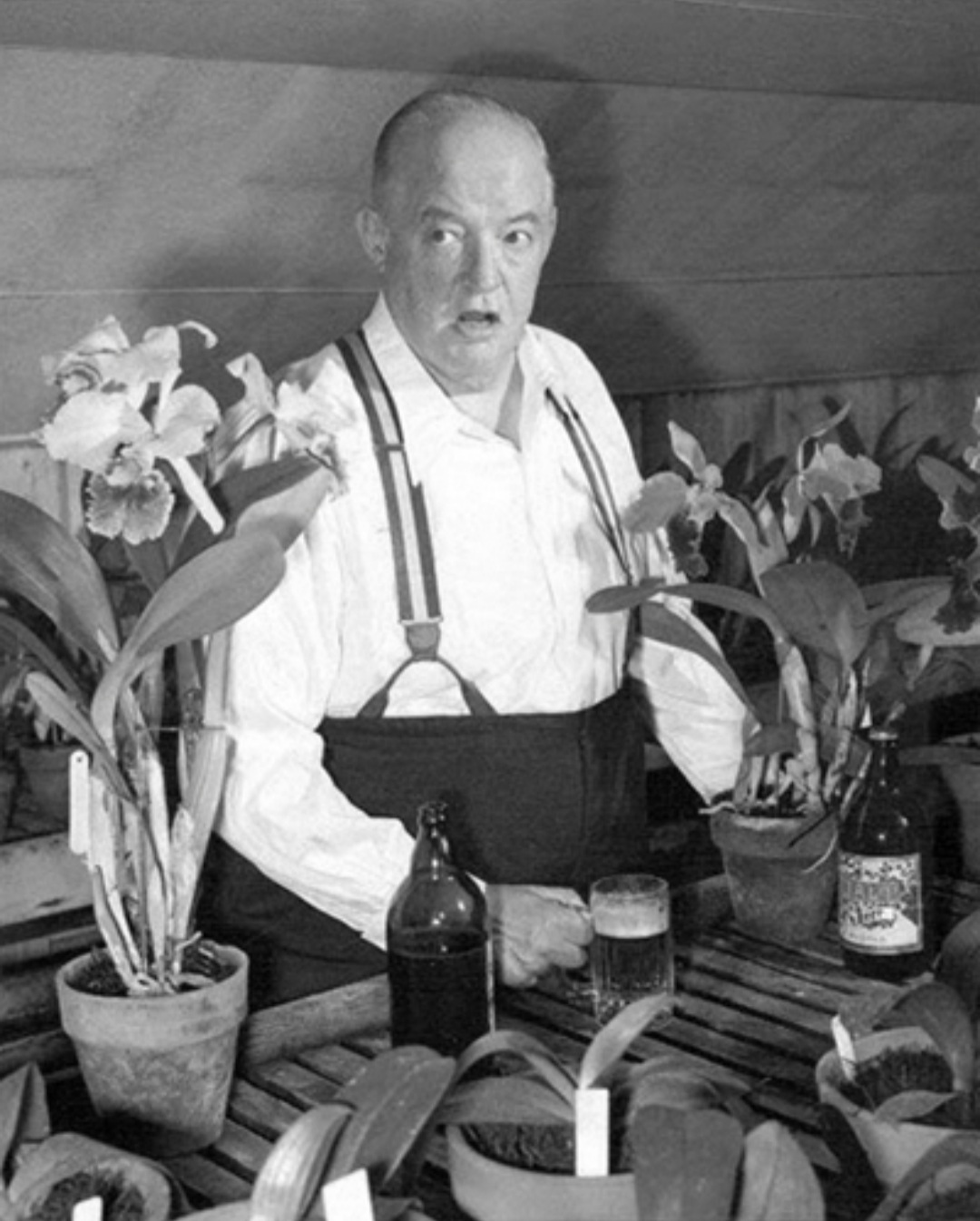
Sydney Greenstreet starred in NBC's The New Adventures of Nero Wolfe (1950–1951)

Nero Wolfe has been portrayed in four radio drama series on five different networks.

==== The Adventures of Nero Wolfe (ABC) ====
Three actors portrayed Nero Wolfe over the course of the 1943–44 radio series, The Adventures of Nero Wolfe. J. B. Williams starred in its first incarnation (April 10 – June 26, 1943) on the regional New England Network. Santos Ortega assumed the role when the suspense drama moved to ABC (July 5 – September 27, 1943; January 21 – July 14, 1944). Luis Van Rooten succeeded Ortega sometime in 1944. Louis Vittes wrote most of the scripts for the 30-minute episodes, basing none of them on Stout's original stories.

Only one episode of the series is in circulation. "The Last Laugh Murder Case" (July 14, 1944) was chosen for rebroadcast by the Armed Forces Radio Service's Mystery Playhouse series.

==== The Amazing Nero Wolfe (MBS) ====
Francis X. Bushman starred in The Amazing Nero Wolfe, a 1945 radio drama series on the Mutual Broadcasting System. Broadcast July 17 – November 30, 1945, the series was a product of the Don Lee Network, a California affiliate, and may have been broadcast only in that region. Louis Vittes wrote the scripts for the 30-minute program, based on Stout's principal characters but not his stories.

Although 21 episodes were produced, the series finale, "The Case of the Shakespeare Folio", is the only episode that has survived in radio collections.

==== The New Adventures of Nero Wolfe (NBC) ====
Sydney Greenstreet starred in The New Adventures of Nero Wolfe, a 1950–51 series that aired on NBC October 20, 1950 – April 27, 1951. Produced by Edwin Fadiman and directed by J. Donald Wilson, the show was written by Alfred Bester.

Biographer John McAleer reported that Stout enjoyed Greenstreet's portrayal. The New Adventures of Nero Wolfe was the first radio series that, like the Stout stories themselves, stressed characterization over plot. With all but one episode in circulation, it is regarded as the series that is most responsible for popularizing Nero Wolfe on radio.

==== Nero Wolfe (CBC) ====
Mavor Moore starred in the 1982 Canadian Broadcasting Corporation series Nero Wolfe, broadcast January 16 – April 10, 1982. Don Francks portrayed Archie Goodwin, and Cec Linder played Inspector Cramer. The series was produced and directed by actor Ron Hartmann, who spent two years writing the hour-long radio adaptations of Stout's original stories. The 13 episode series was praised for its high production values and faithful presentation.

==== "The Boy who Cried Wolfe" ====
The Post Meridian Radio Players, a radio theater troupe in Boston, presented a gender-swapped staged radio drama titled "The Boy who Cried Wolfe" July 20–28, 2018. An adaptation of a December 1950 episode of the NBC radio series, the production changed the genders of all of the characters; Nero Wolfe became Vera Wolfe, and Archie became Audrey Goodwin. The piece was performed along with an Arsene Lupin story and an adaptation of the Sherlock Holmes story "The Final Problem" as part of the troupe's summer mystery series, "Moriarty's Mysteries".

=== Television ===
==== Omnibus, "The Fine Art of Murder" (ABC) ====
Rex Stout appeared in the December 9, 1956, episode of Omnibus, a cultural anthology series that epitomized the golden age of television. Hosted by Alistair Cooke and directed by Paul Bogart, "The Fine Art of Murder" was a 40-minute segment described by Time magazine as "a homicide as Sir Arthur Conan Doyle, Edgar Allan Poe [and] Rex Stout would variously present it". The author is credited as appearing along with Gene Reynolds (Archie Goodwin), Robert Eckles (Nero Wolfe), James Daly (narrator), Dennis Hoey (Arthur Conan Doyle), Felix Munro (Edgar Allan Poe), Herbert Voland (M. Dupin) and Jack Sydow. Writer Sidney Carroll received the 1957 Edgar Award for Best Episode in a TV Series. "The Fine Art of Murder" is in the collection of the Library of Congress (VBE 2397–2398) and screened in its Mary Pickford Theater February 15, 2000.

==== Nero Wolfe (CBS) ====
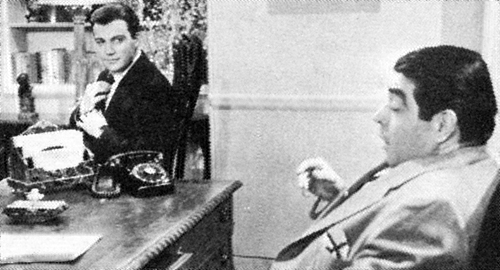
William Shatner as Archie Goodwin and Kurt Kasznar as Nero Wolfe in the aborted 1959 CBS-TV series

On September 15, 1949, Rex Stout wrote a confidential memo to Edwin Fadiman, who represented his radio, film and television interests. The memo provided detailed character descriptions of Nero Wolfe and Archie Goodwin, and a physical description and diagram of Wolfe's office. Stout's biographer John McAleer inferred the memo was guidance for the NBC Nero Wolfe radio series that began in October 1950, but in summarizing the memo's unique revelations he remarked, "A TV producer could not have hoped for more specifics." (Note: Rex Stout's confidential memo of September 15, 1949, describing Nero Wolfe, Archie Goodwin and Wolfe's office, is reprinted in the back matter of the 1992 Bantam Crimeline edition of Fer-de-Lance (ISBN 0-553-27819-3).)

On October 22, 1949, Billboard reported that Fadiman Associates was packaging a television series featuring Rex Stout's Nero Wolfe characters. When CBS-TV's Perry Mason went into production, Stout received some 50 offers from film and TV producers hoping to follow up on its success with a Nero Wolfe series. By April 1957 CBS had purchased the rights and was pitching a Nero Wolfe TV series to advertisers. The series had Stout's enthusiastic cooperation.

In March 1959, The New York Times reported that Kurt Kasznar and William Shatner would portray Nero Wolfe and Archie Goodwin in the CBS-TV series. Both actors were then starring on Broadway—the Vienna-born Kasznar in Noel Coward's Look After Lulu! and Shatner in The World of Suzie Wong.

Nero Wolfe was co-produced by Gordon Duff and Otis L. Guernsey, Jr., with Edwin Fadiman as executive producer. The theme music was composed by Alex North. (Note: Film score researcher Bill Wrobel located Alex North's unheard score for Nero Wolfe and six recorded tracks on digital audio tape in the UCLA Music Library Special Collections. He identifies 30 CBS digital audio tapes (p. 168), with tracks 86–91 of DAT #11 being the Nero Wolfe music of Alex North (p. 174). The score, CPN5912, is in Box #105 (p. 51).)

The pilot episode, "Count the Man Down", written by Sidney Carroll (Note: Dated December 31, 1958, the first draft script for Nero Wolfe is in the Performing Arts Special Collections at UCLA, in Box 27, Folder 6 of the Sidney Carroll Papers 1957–1981.) and directed by Tom Donovan, was filmed in Manhattan in March 1959. The half-hour program concerned the mysterious death of a scientist during a guided missile launch at Cape Canaveral. Guest stars include Alexander Scourby (Mr. Belson), Phyllis Hill (Leslie Gear), George Voskovec (Dr. Wohlgang), Eva Seregni (Mrs. Lowenberg), Frank Marth (Ernest Petchen), John McLiam (Professor Adams), John C. Becher (Mr. Faversham), Eileen Fulton (Receptionist), and Rene Paul (Christian Lowenberg).

The series was to air Mondays at 10 p.m. ET beginning in September 1959. But in April, CBS announced that the new comedy series Hennesey would occupy the time slot.

In June 1959, Baltimore Sun critic Donald Kirkley reported that the Nero Wolfe pilot had been "in a way, too successful ... Everything seemed to point to a sale of the series. A facsimile of the brownstone house in which Wolfe lives in the novels ... was found in Grammercy [sic] Square. But when the film was made and shown around, it was considered too good to be confined to half an hour." In October 1960, William Shatner was reportedly still working to sell the first television adaptation of Nero Wolfe to the networks.

The 1959 Nero Wolfe pilot episode was released on DVD and Blu-ray in October 2018 by VCI Entertainment, in Television's Lost Classics: Volume 2. The four rare pilots on the release were digitally restored in high definition by SabuCat Productions from the best archival film elements available.

==== Nero Wolfe (Paramount Television) ====
In an interview May 27, 1967, Rex Stout told author Dick Lochte that Orson Welles had once wanted to make a series of Nero Wolfe movies, and Stout had turned him down. (Note: Dick Lochte discussed the Stout interview in an online post March 8, 2000.) Disappointed with the Nero Wolfe movies of the 1930s, Stout was leery of Nero Wolfe film and TV projects in America during his lifetime: "That's something my heirs can fool around with, if they've a mind to", he said. In 1976, a year after Stout's death, Paramount Television purchased the rights for the entire set of Nero Wolfe stories for Orson Welles. (Note: Pre-production materials for Welles's unrealized Nero Wolfe (1976) are contained in the Orson Welles – Oja Kodar Papers 1910–1998 (Box 17) at the University of Michigan Special Collections Library.) Paramount paid $200,000 for the TV rights to eight hours of Nero Wolfe. The producers planned to begin with an ABC-TV movie and hoped to persuade Welles to continue the role in a mini-series. Frank D. Gilroy was signed to write the television script ("The Doorbell Rang") and direct the TV movie on the assurance that Welles would star, but by April 1977 Welles had bowed out. Thayer David was cast as Wolfe in the 1977 TV movie.

In March 1980, Paramount was planning a weekly NBC-TV series as a starring vehicle for Welles; Leon Tokatyan (Lou Grant) was to write the pilot. Welles again declined because he wanted to do a series of 90-minute specials, perhaps two or three a year, instead of a weekly series. William Conrad was cast as Wolfe in the 1981 TV series.

===== Nero Wolfe (1977) =====
In 1977, Paramount Television filmed Nero Wolfe, an adaptation of Stout's novel The Doorbell Rang. Thayer David and Tom Mason starred as Nero Wolfe and Archie Goodwin; Anne Baxter costarred as Mrs. Rachel Bruner. Written and directed by Frank D. Gilroy, the made-for-TV movie was produced as a pilot for a possible upcoming series—but the film had not yet aired at the time of Thayer David's death in July 1978. Nero Wolfe was finally broadcast December 18, 1979, as an ABC-TV late show.

===== Nero Wolfe (1981) =====
Paramount Television remounted Nero Wolfe as a weekly one-hour series that ran on NBC TV from January through August 1981. The project was recast with William Conrad stepping into the role of Nero Wolfe and Lee Horsley portraying Archie Goodwin. Although it was titled "Rex Stout's Nero Wolfe", the production departed considerably from the originals. All 14 episodes were set in contemporary New York City.

==== Nero Wolfe (A&E Network) ====
Independent producer Michael Jaffe's efforts to secure the rights to the Nero Wolfe stories date back to his earliest days in the business. In the mid-1970s he was working with his father, Henry Jaffe, a successful attorney turned producer, when the Nero Wolfe rights came on the market. Warner Bros. wanted to adapt the Zeck trilogy for a feature film and approached Henry Jaffe, who traveled to New York to negotiate with the agent for Rex Stout's estate but lost out to Paramount Television.

"We finally got this opportunity", said Michael Jaffe. "I had chased the rights numerous times. One of the reasons that I never actually tried to make it as a series was that I didn't believe a network would ever let us make it the right way. Then A&E came along, and Allen Sabinson. I've known him for years and years. He swore he'd let me make it the right way. (Note: Allen Sabinson became a programming consultant for A&E in 1999, and was named the network's senior vice president for programming in spring 2001.) (Note: Jaffe/Braunstein Films, Ltd., secured the rights to the Nero Wolfe stories in 1998. (U.S. Copyright Office Document Number V3412D882, recorded March 13, 1998.))

In March 2000, Maury Chaykin (as Nero Wolfe) and Timothy Hutton (as Archie Goodwin) starred in The Golden Spiders: A Nero Wolfe Mystery, a Jaffe/Braunstein Films co-production with the A&E Network. High ratings led to the original series, A Nero Wolfe Mystery (2001–2002), most often called Nero Wolfe.

Hutton served as an executive producer and directed four telefilms. Nero Wolfe adapted the plots and dialogue of the Stout originals closely; unlike previous Wolfe adaptations, the series retained Archie Goodwin's first-person narration and did not update the stories to contemporary times. The episodes were colorful period pieces, set primarily in the 1940s–1950s. (Note: The exception is the second-season premiere directed by Timothy Hutton. "For Death of a Doxy, Tim decided to play it in the early sixties", producer Michael Jaffe said. "If you look at that episode, it's really fun, because everything—the wardrobe, the art direction—is different, since it's a different generation. It breaks our mold.") The production values were exceptional and critics responded favorably.

Other members of the principal cast were Colin Fox (Fritz Brenner), Conrad Dunn (Saul Panzer), Fulvio Cecere (Fred Durkin), Trent McMullen (Orrie Cather), Saul Rubinek (Lon Cohen), Bill Smitrovich (Inspector Cramer) and R.D. Reid (Sergeant Purley Stebbins). In a practice reminiscent of the mystery movie series of the 1930s and 1940s, the show rarely used guest stars in the roles of victims, killers and suspects, but instead used the same ensemble of supporting actors each week. An actor who had been "killed off" in one show might portray the murderer in the next. Actress Kari Matchett was a member of this repertory group while also having a recurring role in the series as Archie Goodwin's girlfriend Lily Rowan; other frequent members of the troupe included Nicky Guadagni, Debra Monk, George Plimpton, Ron Rifkin, Francie Swift, and James Tolkan.

Production of Nero Wolfe coincided with Rex Stout's becoming a top-selling author some 30 years after his death. A&E released the series on Region 1 DVD as two sets (The Golden Spiders bundled with the second season), and as a single eight-disc thinpack set.

==== International productions ====
===== German TV miniseries (1961) =====
A German TV adaption of Too Many Cooks—Zu viele Köche (1961)—starred Heinz Klevenow as Nero Wolfe, and Joachim Fuchsberger as Archie Goodwin. After he protested that his story was used without permission, Rex Stout received a $3,500 settlement.

===== Italian TV series (1969–1971) =====
"The name Nero Wolfe has magic in Italy," wrote Rex Stout's biographer John McAleer. In 1968, the Italian television network RAI paid Stout $80,000 for the rights to produce 12 Nero Wolfe stories. "He agreed only because he would never see them," McAleer wrote.

From February 1969 to February 1971, Italian television broadcast 10 Nero Wolfe TV movies. These are the episodes in order of appearance:

1. Veleno in sartoria (The Red Box)
2. Circuito chiuso (If Death Ever Slept)
3. Per la fama di Cesare (Some Buried Caesar)
4. Il Pesce più grosso (The Doorbell Rang)
5. Un incidente di caccia (Where There's a Will)
6. Il patto dei sei (The Rubber Band)
7. La casa degli attori (Counterfeit for Murder)
8. La bella bugiarda (Murder Is Corny)
9. Sfida al cioccolato (Gambit)
10. Salsicce 'Mezzanotte' (Too Many Cooks)

In the Best Families and The Final Deduction were among the titles for which RAI also bought the rights, but were not filmed.

The successful series of black-and-white telemovies star Tino Buazzelli (Nero Wolfe), Paolo Ferrari (Archie Goodwin), Pupo De Luca (Fritz Brenner), Renzo Palmer (Inspector Cramer), Roberto Pistone (Saul Panzer), Mario Righetti (Orrie Cather) and Gianfranco Varetto (Fred Durkin). The whole series became available on DVD in 2007.

===== Russian TV series (2001–02, 2005) =====
A series of Russian Nero Wolfe TV movies was made from 2001 to 2005. One of the adaptations, Poka ya ne umer ("Before I Die") (Russian: Пока я не умер), was written by Vladimir Valutsky, screenwriter for a Russian Sherlock Holmes television series in the 1980s. Nero Wolfe is played by Donatas Banionis, and Archie Goodwin by Sergei Zhigunov.

The first season (Niro Vulf i Archi Gudvin) (Russian: Ниро Вульф и Арчи Гудвин) comprises five episodes, listed in order of appearance:

1. Poka ya ne umer (Before I Die)
2. Letayuschiy pistolet (The Gun with Wings)
3. Golos s togo sveta (The Silent Speaker)
4. Delo v shlyape (Disguise for Murder)
5. Voskresnut` chtoby umeret` (Man Alive)

The second season (Noviye Priklucheniya Niro Vulfa i Archi Gudvina) (Russian: Новые приключения Ниро Вульфа и Арчи Гудвина) comprises four episodes, listed in order of appearance:

1. Podarok dlya Lili (Black Orchids)
2. Poslednyaya volya Marko (The Black Mountain)
3. Shlishkom mnogo zhenschin (Too Many Women)
4. Taina krasnoy shkatulki (The Red Box)

===== Italian TV series (2012) =====
On April 5, 2012, the RAI network in Italy began a new Nero Wolfe series starring Francesco Pannofino as Nero Wolfe and Pietro Sermonti as Archie Goodwin. Produced by Casanova Multimedia and Rai Fiction, the eight-episode series, which ran for a single season, began with "La traccia del serpente", an adaptation of Fer-de-Lance set in 1959 in Rome, where Wolfe and Archie reside after leaving the United States.

MHz Choice began streaming the series with English subtitles in North America in November 2017 and released it on DVD in January 2018.

The series comprises eight episodes, listed in order of appearance:

1. La traccia del serpente (The Trail of the Snake – based on Fer-de-Lance)
2. Champagne per uno (Champagne for One)
3. La principessa Orchidea (Princess Orchid - based on The Golden Spiders)
4. Il patto dei sei (The Pact of Six - based on The Rubber Band)
5. Scacco al Re (Checkmate to the King – based on Gambit)
6. Parassiti (Parasites - based on If Death Ever Slept)
7. La scatola rossa (The Red Box)
8. Coppia di spade (Pair of Swords – based on Over My Dead Body)

=== Stage ===
==== Festa di Natale (Italy, 2009) ====
The Teatro del Stabile del Giallo in Rome presented a stage adaptation of "Christmas Party" November 14 – December 20, 2009.

==== The Red Box (2014) ====
Park Square Theatre in Saint Paul, Minnesota, commissioned a world-premiere stage adaption of The Red Box, presented June 6 – July 13, 2014 (previews beginning May 30). Written by Joseph Goodrich and directed by Peter Moore, the two-act production starred E.J. Subkoviak (Nero Wolfe), Sam Pearson (Archie Goodwin), Michael Paul Levin (Inspector Cramer), Jim Pounds (Fritz Brenner, Rene Gebert), Nicholas Leeman (Lew Frost), Rebecca Wilson (Helen Frost), Suzanne Egli (Calida Frost), James Cada (Dudley Frost) and Bob Malos (Boyden McNair).

"For audiences who might not be familiar with Wolfe and his trusty assistant Archie Goodwin, it's a terrific introduction to the characters and the milieu", wrote the Saint Paul Pioneer Press.

The stage production was authorized by the estate of Rex Stout; Stout's daughter, Rebecca Stout Bradbury, attended the opening. "It's something of a surprise that none of the Wolfe novels have been adapted for the stage before", wrote the Twin Cities Daily Planet. "If The Red Box is any indication, many more will be."

==== Might as Well Be Dead (2017) ====
Park Square Theatre in Saint Paul, Minnesota, commissioned a world-premiere stage adaptation of the Wolfe novel Might as Well Be Dead to be presented June 16 – July 30, 2017. The second stage production to be authorized by the estate of Rex Stout, the play was written by Joseph Goodrich and directed by Peter Moore. They were also responsible for a successful adaptation of The Red Box, presented at Park Square Theatre in 2014.
