= Man Alive (short story) =

- Short story by Rex Stout
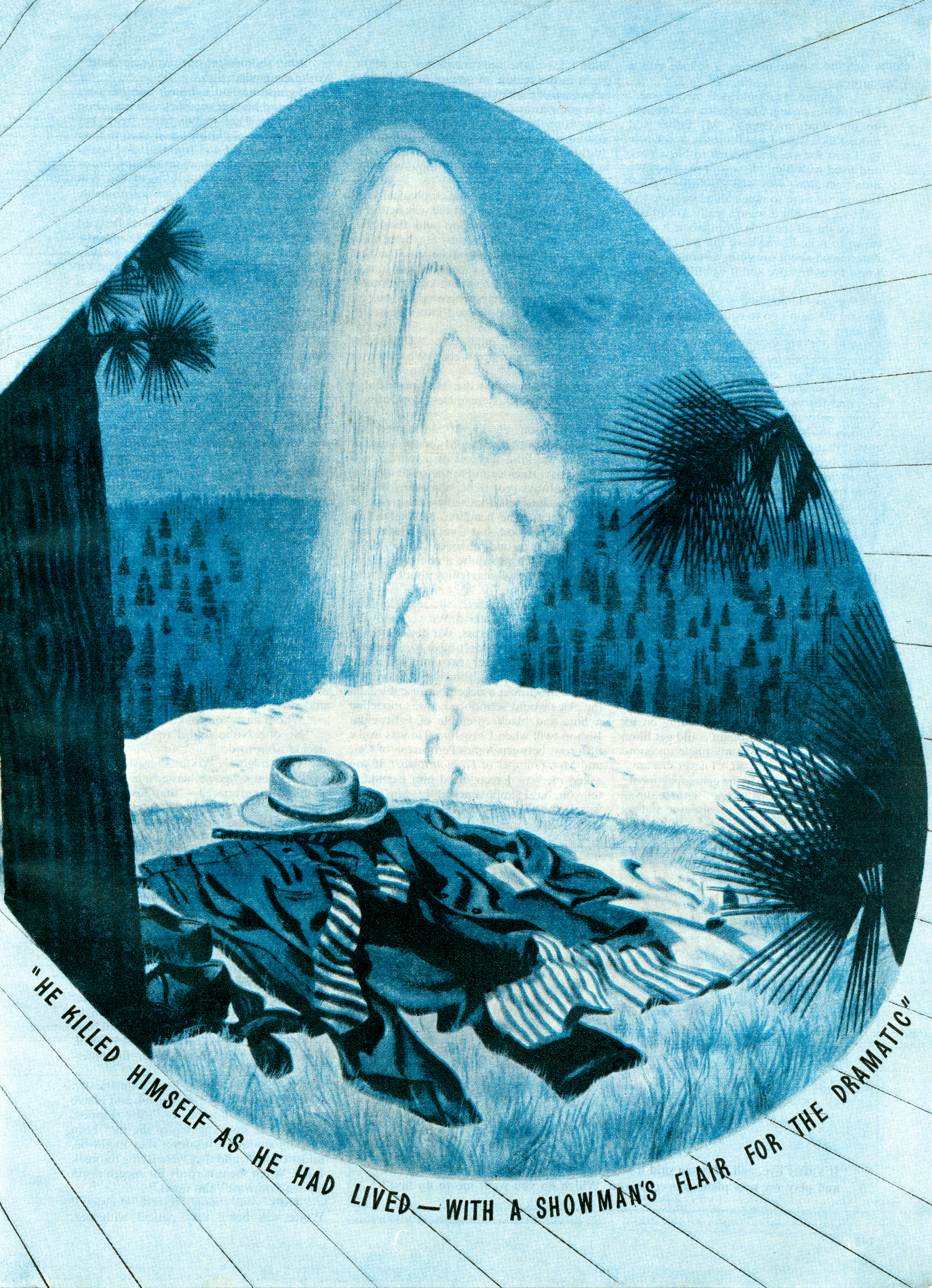
- Illustrated by Stanley Ekman
- Country: United States
- Language: English
- Genre: Detective fiction

Publication
- Published in: The American Magazine
- Publication type: Periodical
- Publication date: December 1947
- Series: Nero Wolfe

"Man Alive" is a Nero Wolfe mystery novella by Rex Stout, first published in the December 1947 issue of The American Magazine. It first appeared in book form in the short-story collection Three Doors to Death, published by the Viking Press in 1950.

== Plot summary ==
A high-fashion designer consults Wolfe after she sees her uncle — believed to have committed suicide a year before — in disguise and in the audience at one of her shows.

== Publication history ==
=== "Man Alive" ===
- 1947, The American Magazine, December 1947
- 1999, Canada, Durkin Hayes Publishing, DH Audio ISBN 1-55204-627-3 December 1999, audio cassette, read by Saul Rubinek

=== Three Doors to Death ===
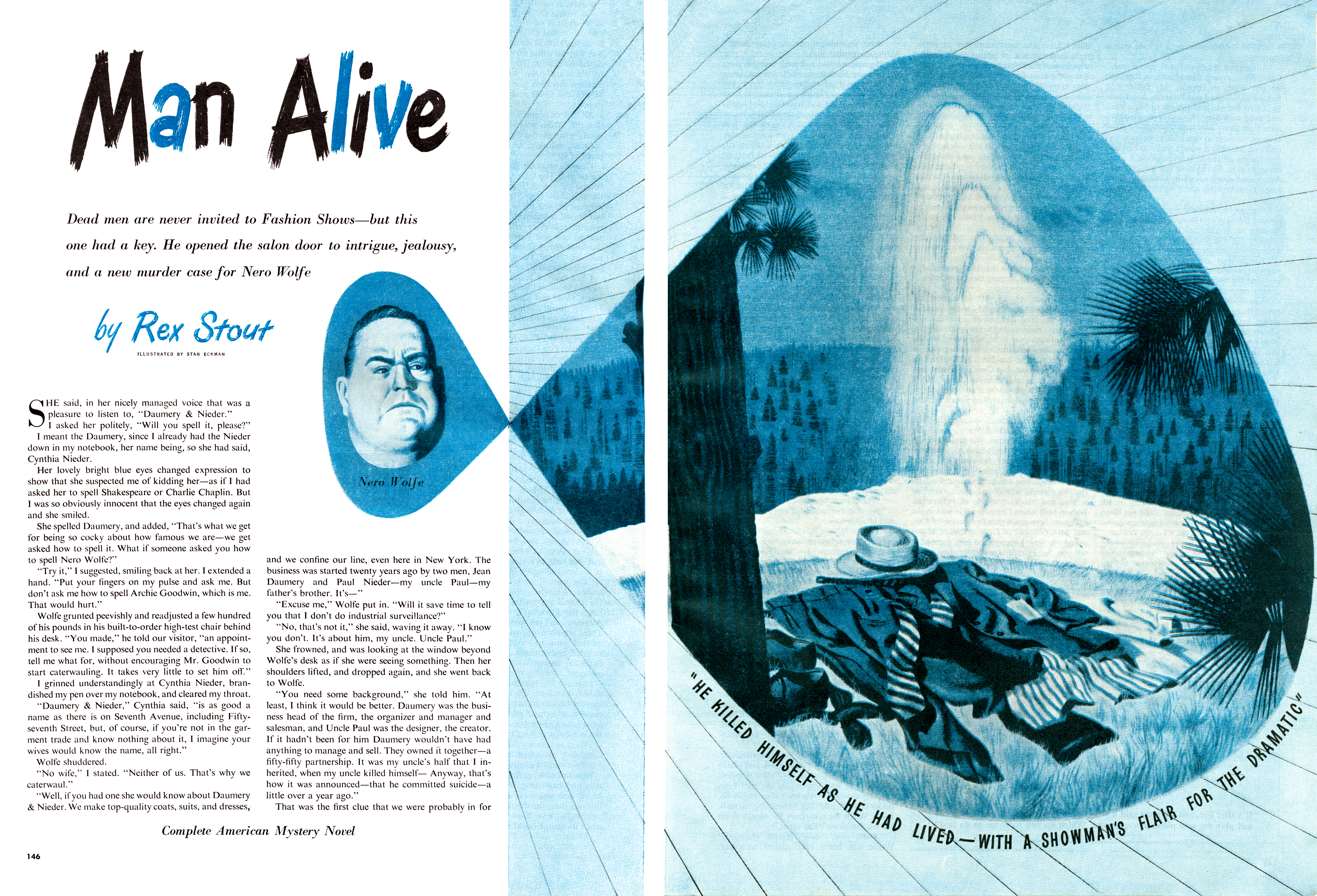

- 1950, New York: The Viking Press, April 21, 1950, hardcover

Contents include "Man Alive", "Omit Flowers" and "Door to Death".
In his limited-edition pamphlet, Collecting Mystery Fiction #9, Rex Stout's Nero Wolfe Part I, Otto Penzler describes the first edition of Three Doors to Death: "Green cloth, front cover and spine printed with black; rear cover blank. Issued in a mainly reddish-orange dust wrapper."
In April 2006, Firsts: The Book Collector's Magazine estimated that the first edition of Three Doors to Death had a value of between $300 and $500. The estimate is for a copy in very good to fine condition in a like dustjacket.

- 1950, New York: Viking (Mystery Guild), August 1950, hardcover

The far less valuable Viking book club edition may be distinguished from the first edition in three ways:

- The dust jacket has "Book Club Edition" printed on the inside front flap, and the price is absent (first editions may be price clipped if they were given as gifts).
- Book club editions are sometimes thinner and always taller (usually a quarter of an inch) than first editions.
- Book club editions are bound in cardboard, and first editions are bound in cloth (or have at least a cloth spine).

- 1950, London: Collins Crime Club, September 18, 1950, hardcover
- 1952, New York: Dell (mapback by Rafael de Soto), 1952, #626, paperback
- 1961, New York: The Viking Press, Five of a Kind: The Third Nero Wolfe Omnibus (with The Rubber Band and In the Best Families), July 10, 1961, hardcover
- 1966, New York: Bantam #F3154, June 1966, paperback
- 1995, New York: Bantam Crimeline ISBN 0-553-25127-9 February 1995, paperback
- 2010, New York: Bantam Crimeline ISBN 0-307-75623-8 June 9, 2010, e-book

== Adaptations ==
=== Nero Wolfe (CBC Radio) ===
"Man Alive" was adapted as the seventh episode of the Canadian Broadcasting Corporation's 13-part radio series Nero Wolfe (1982), starring Mavor Moore as Nero Wolfe, Don Francks as Archie Goodwin, and Cec Linder as Inspector Cramer. Written and directed by Toronto actor and producer Ron Hartmann, the hour-long adaptation aired on CBC Stereo February 27, 1982.
