= Omit Flowers =

- Short story by Rex Stout
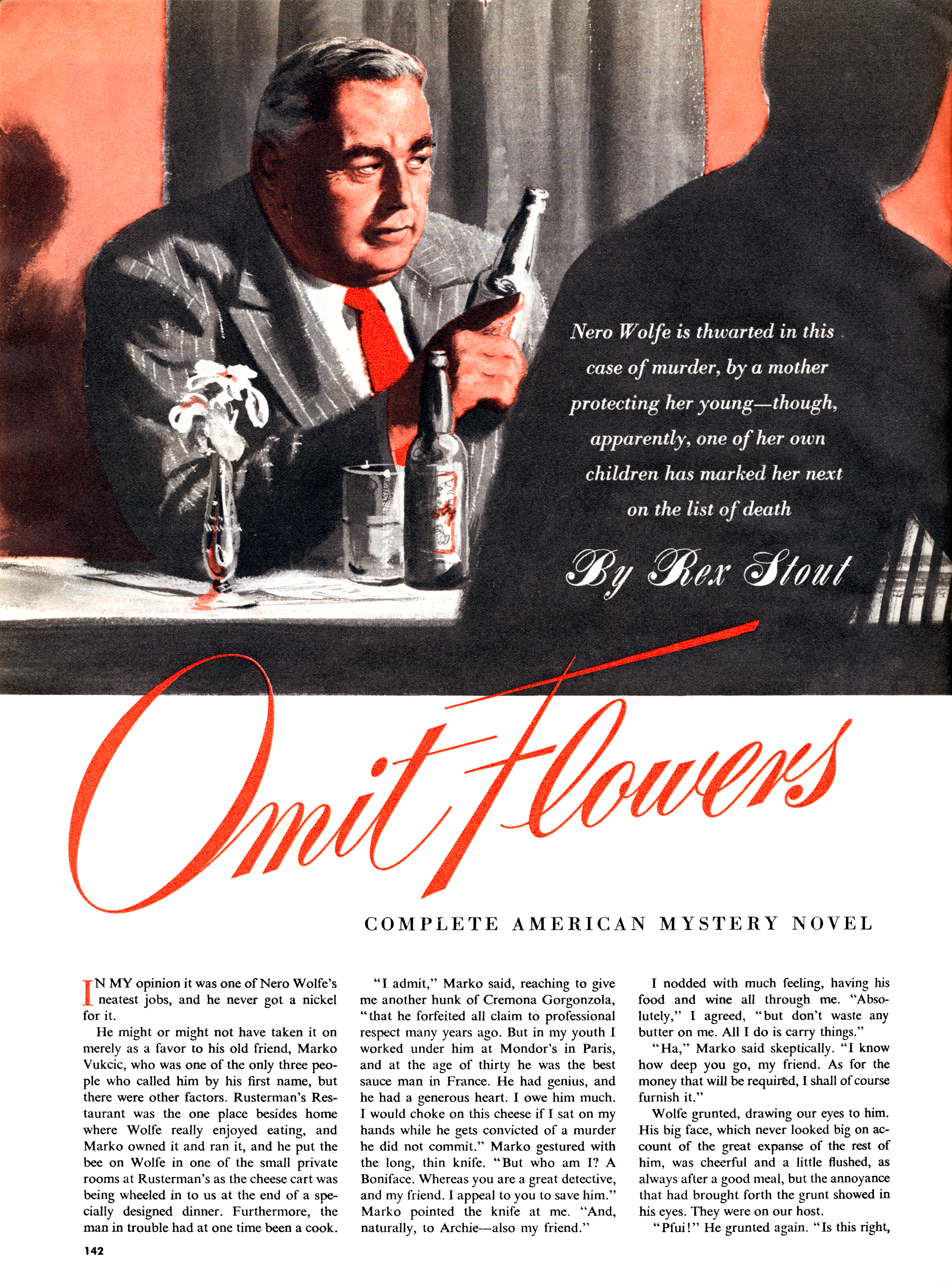
- Illustrated by Thornton Utz
- Country: United States
- Language: English
- Genre: Detective fiction

Publication
- Published in: The American Magazine
- Publication type: Periodical
- Publication date: November 1948
- Series: Nero Wolfe

"Omit Flowers" is a Nero Wolfe mystery novella by Rex Stout, first published in the November 1948 issue of The American Magazine. It first appeared in book form in the short-story collection Three Doors to Death, published by the Viking Press in 1950.

== Plot summary ==
As a favor for his oldest friend Marko Vukcic, Nero Wolfe takes the case of Virgil Pompa, a chef who traded his genius for a high-paying job as the supervisor of a restaurant chain. He is in jail, charged with murder. Archie begins the story with the statement, "In my opinion it was one of Nero Wolfe's neatest jobs, and he never got a nickel for it."

== Publication history ==
=== "Omit Flowers" ===
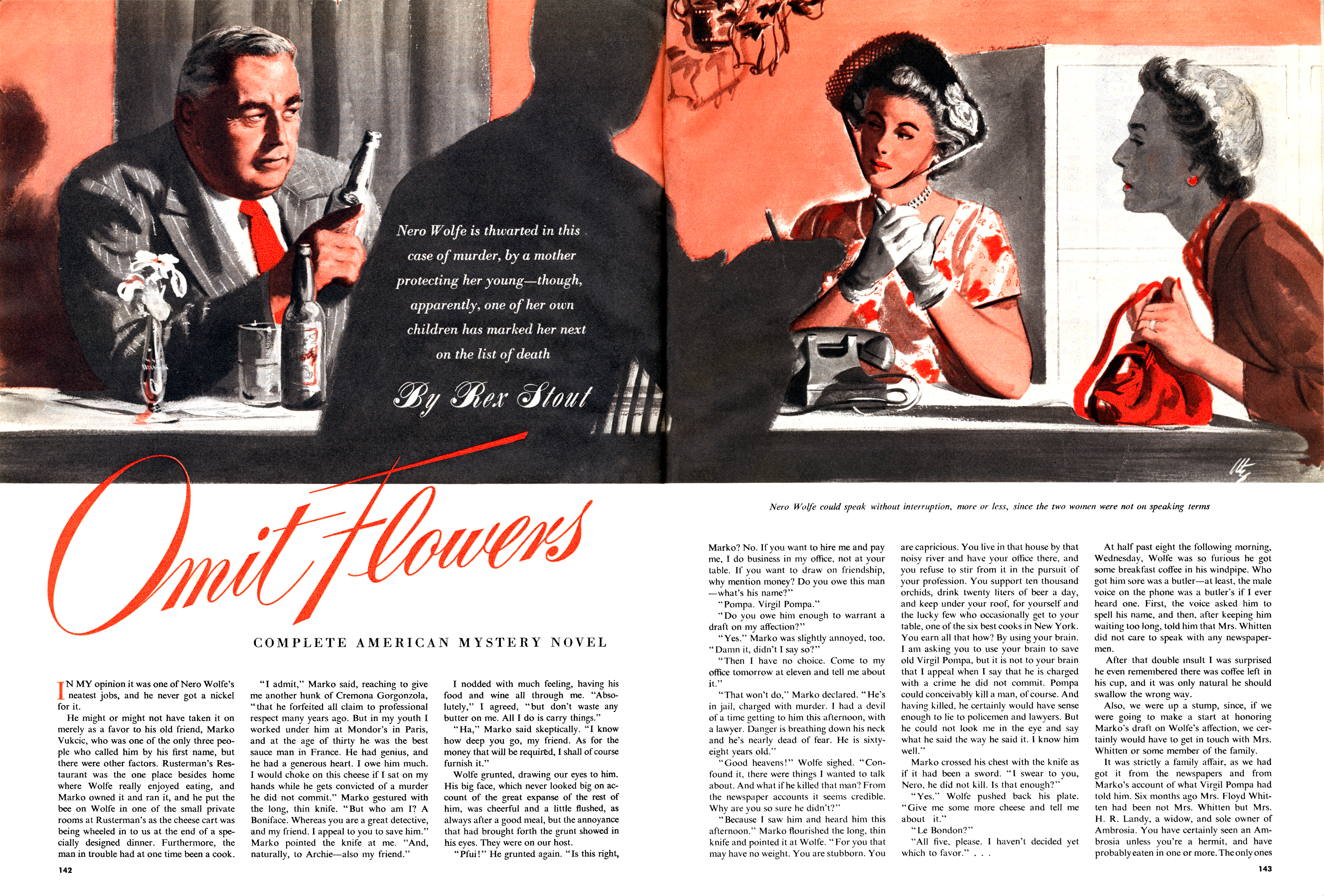

- 1948, The American Magazine, November 1948

=== Three Doors to Death ===
- 1950, New York: The Viking Press, April 21, 1950, hardcover

Contents include "Man Alive", "Omit Flowers" and "Door to Death".
In his limited-edition pamphlet, Collecting Mystery Fiction #9, Rex Stout's Nero Wolfe Part I, Otto Penzler describes the first edition of Three Doors to Death: "Green cloth, front cover and spine printed with black; rear cover blank. Issued in a mainly reddish-orange dust wrapper."
In April 2006, Firsts: The Book Collector's Magazine estimated that the first edition of Three Doors to Death had a value of between $300 and $500. The estimate is for a copy in very good to fine condition in a like dustjacket.

- 1950, New York: Viking (Mystery Guild), August 1950, hardcover

The far less valuable Viking book club edition may be distinguished from the first edition in three ways:

- The dust jacket has "Book Club Edition" printed on the inside front flap, and the price is absent (first editions may be price clipped if they were given as gifts).
- Book club editions are sometimes thinner and always taller (usually a quarter of an inch) than first editions.
- Book club editions are bound in cardboard, and first editions are bound in cloth (or have at least a cloth spine).

- 1950, London: Collins Crime Club, September 18, 1950, hardcover
- 1952, New York: Dell (mapback by Rafael de Soto), 1952, #626, paperback
- 1961, New York: The Viking Press, Five of a Kind: The Third Nero Wolfe Omnibus (with The Rubber Band and In the Best Families), July 10, 1961, hardcover
- 1966, New York: Bantam #F3154, June 1966, paperback
- 1995, New York: Bantam Crimeline ISBN 0-553-25127-9 February 1995, paperback
- 2010, New York: Bantam Crimeline ISBN 0-307-75623-8 June 9, 2010, e-book
