= Door to Death =

- Short story by Rex Stout
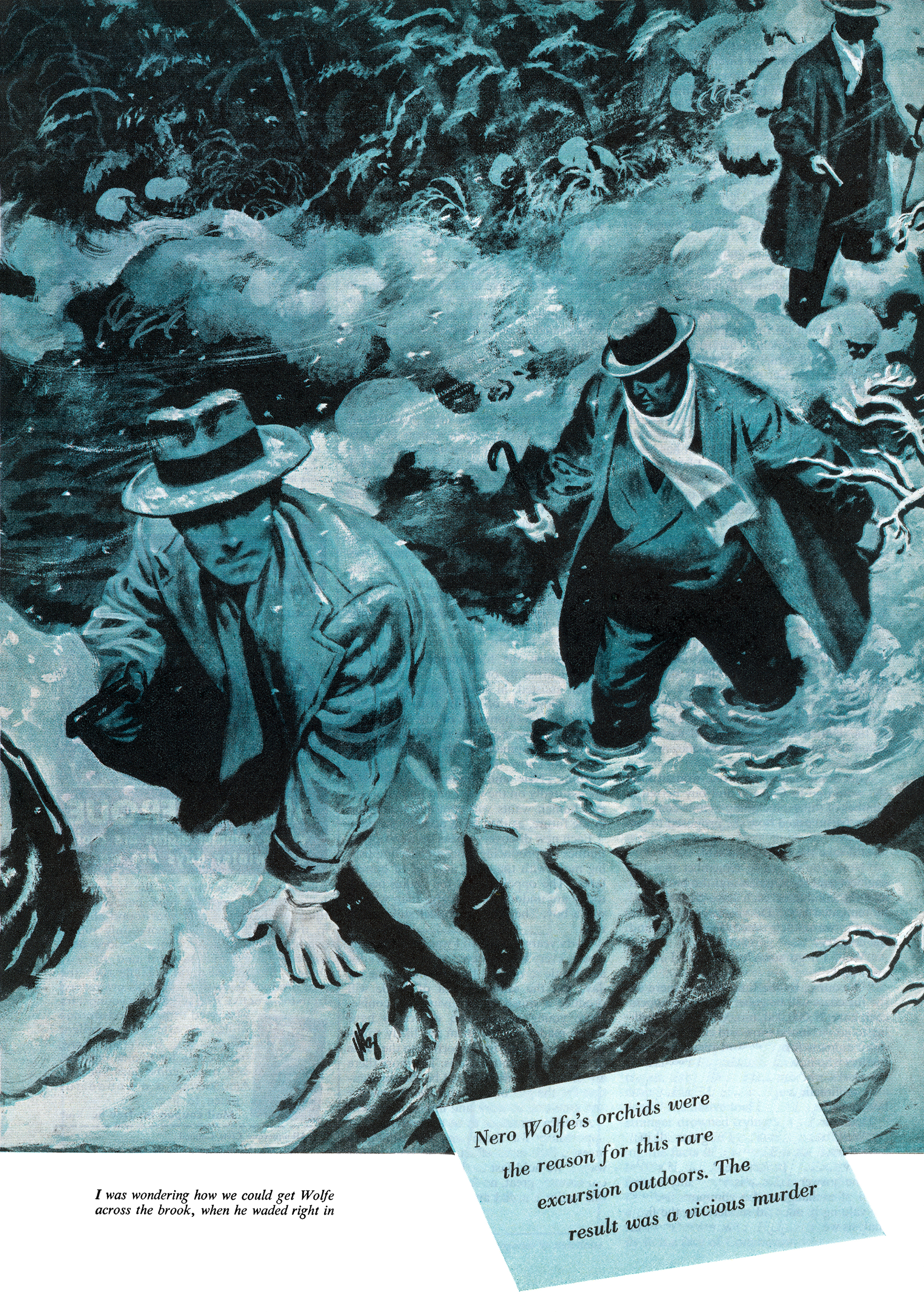
- Illustrated by Thornton Utz
- Country: United States
- Language: English
- Genre: Detective fiction

Publication
- Published in: The American Magazine
- Publication type: Periodical
- Publication date: June 1949
- Series: Nero Wolfe

"Door to Death" is a Nero Wolfe mystery novella by Rex Stout, first published in the June 1949 issue of The American Magazine. It first appeared in book form in the short-story collection Three Doors to Death, published by the Viking Press in 1950.

== Plot summary ==
When orchid nurse Theodore Horstmann leaves the brownstone indefinitely to tend to his sick mother, Nero Wolfe goes out — in the snow and on foot — into the raging wilds of Westchester to find a replacement. He and Archie find a corpse in the greenhouse, as well.

== Adaptations ==
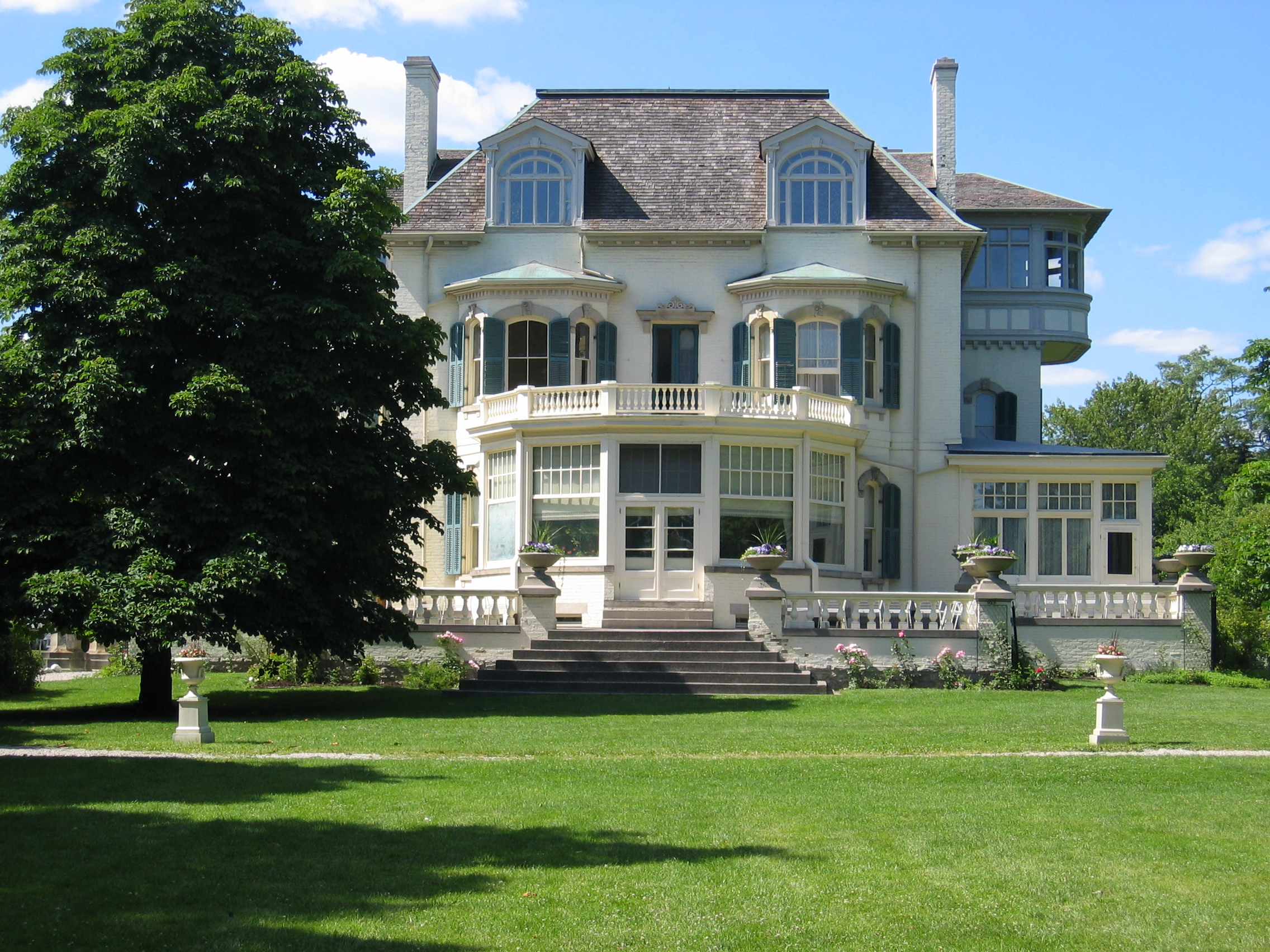
Spadina Historic House and Gardens, the Pitcairn estate in "Door to Death" (A Nero Wolfe Mystery)

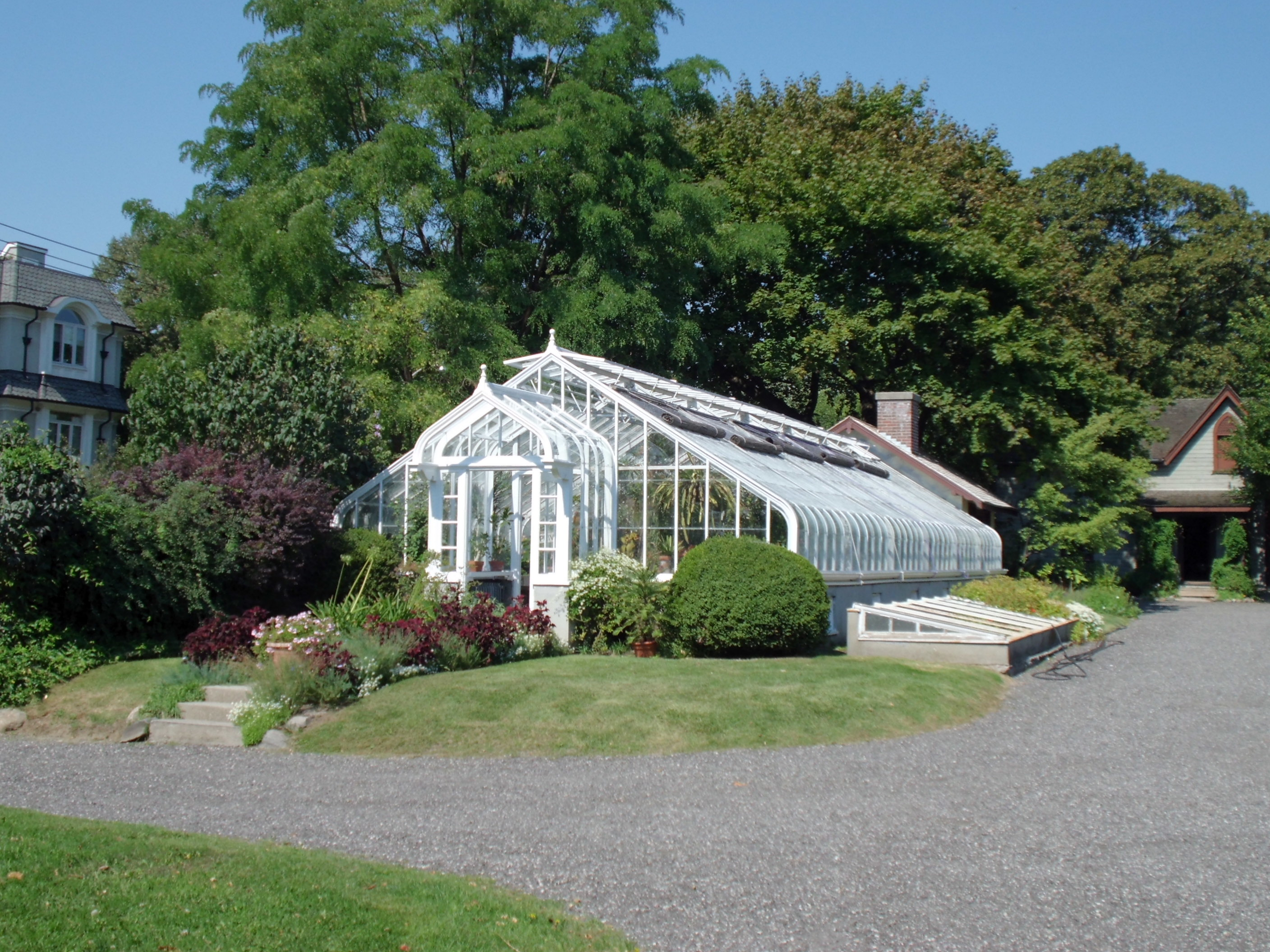
Greenhouse and cottage at Spadina House

=== Nero Wolfe (A&E Network) ===
"Door to Death" was adapted for the first season of the A&E TV series A Nero Wolfe Mystery (2001–2002). Directed by Holly Dale from a teleplay by Sharon Elizabeth Doyle, the episode made its debut June 24, 2001, on A&E.

Timothy Hutton is Archie Goodwin; Maury Chaykin is Nero Wolfe. Other members of the cast (in credits order) are Colin Fox (Fritz Brenner), James Tolkan (Mr. Joseph Pitcairn), Marian Seldes (Mrs. Pitcairn), Kari Matchett (Lily Rowan), Nicholas Campbell (Andy Krasicki), Beau Starr (Lieutenant Noonan), Conrad Dunn (Saul Panzer), Ken Kramer (Neil Imbrie), Kristin Booth (Dini Lauer), Christine Brubaker (Sybil Pitcairn), Boyd Banks (Donald Pitcairn), Nancy Beatty (Vera Imbrie) and Francie Swift (Margot Dickey, uncredited).

In addition to original music by Nero Wolfe composer Michael Small, the soundtrack includes music by Angel Villaldo and Tony Clout. (Note: Angel Villoldo, "El Choclo," arranged by Colin Frechter; Carlin Production Music CAR 164, Latin American (track 13). Tony Clout, "La Concordia"; Carlin Production Music CAR 164, Latin American (track 10).)

In international broadcasts, the episodes "Door to Death" and "Christmas Party" are linked and expanded into a 90-minute widescreen telefilm titled "Wolfe Goes Out". (Note: Program listings for the Sunday, November 7, 2004, broadcast on Sky Movies 2 record the broadcast as widescreen format.)

A Nero Wolfe Mystery began to be released on Region 2 DVD in 2009, marketed in the Netherlands by Just Entertainment. The third collection (EAN 8717344739481), released in April 2010, made the 90-minute features "Wolfe Goes Out" and "Wolfe Stays In" available on home video for the first time. Until then, the linked episodes "Door to Death"/"Christmas Party" and "Eeny Meeny Murder Mo"/"Disguise for Murder" were available only in the abbreviated form sold in North America by A&E Home Video (ISBN 0-7670-8893-X). These DVD releases present the episodes in 4:3 pan and scan rather than their 16:9 aspect ratio for widescreen viewing, and are not offered in high-definition video.

== Publication history ==
"Door to Death" was published in the short-lived Dell 10-cent format in 1951, with a cover by Robert C. Stanley.

=== "Door to Death" ===
- 1949, The American Magazine, June 1949
- 1951, New York: Dell Publishing, Dell Ten Cent Edition #21 (cover illustration by Robert C. Stanley), 1951, paperback

=== Three Doors to Death ===
- 1950, New York: The Viking Press, April 21, 1950, hardcover

Contents include "Man Alive", "Omit Flowers" and "Door to Death".
In his limited-edition pamphlet, Collecting Mystery Fiction #9, Rex Stout's Nero Wolfe Part I, Otto Penzler describes the first edition of Three Doors to Death: "Green cloth, front cover and spine printed with black; rear cover blank. Issued in a mainly reddish-orange dust wrapper."
In April 2006, Firsts: The Book Collector's Magazine estimated that the first edition of Three Doors to Death had a value of between $300 and $500. The estimate is for a copy in very good to fine condition in a like dustjacket.

- 1950, New York: Viking (Mystery Guild), August 1950, hardcover

The far less valuable Viking book club edition may be distinguished from the first edition in three ways:

- The dust jacket has "Book Club Edition" printed on the inside front flap, and the price is absent (first editions may be price clipped if they were given as gifts).
- Book club editions are sometimes thinner and always taller (usually a quarter of an inch) than first editions.
- Book club editions are bound in cardboard, and first editions are bound in cloth (or have at least a cloth spine).

- 1950, London: Collins Crime Club, September 18, 1950, hardcover
- 1952, New York: Dell (mapback by Rafael de Soto), 1952, #626, paperback
- 1961, New York: The Viking Press, Five of a Kind: The Third Nero Wolfe Omnibus (with The Rubber Band and In the Best Families), July 10, 1961, hardcover
- 1966, New York: Bantam #F3154, June 1966, paperback
- 1995, New York: Bantam Crimeline ISBN 0-553-25127-9 February 1995, paperback
- 2010, New York: Bantam Crimeline ISBN 0-307-75623-8 June 9, 2010, e-book
