= Bullet for One =

- Short story by Rex Stout
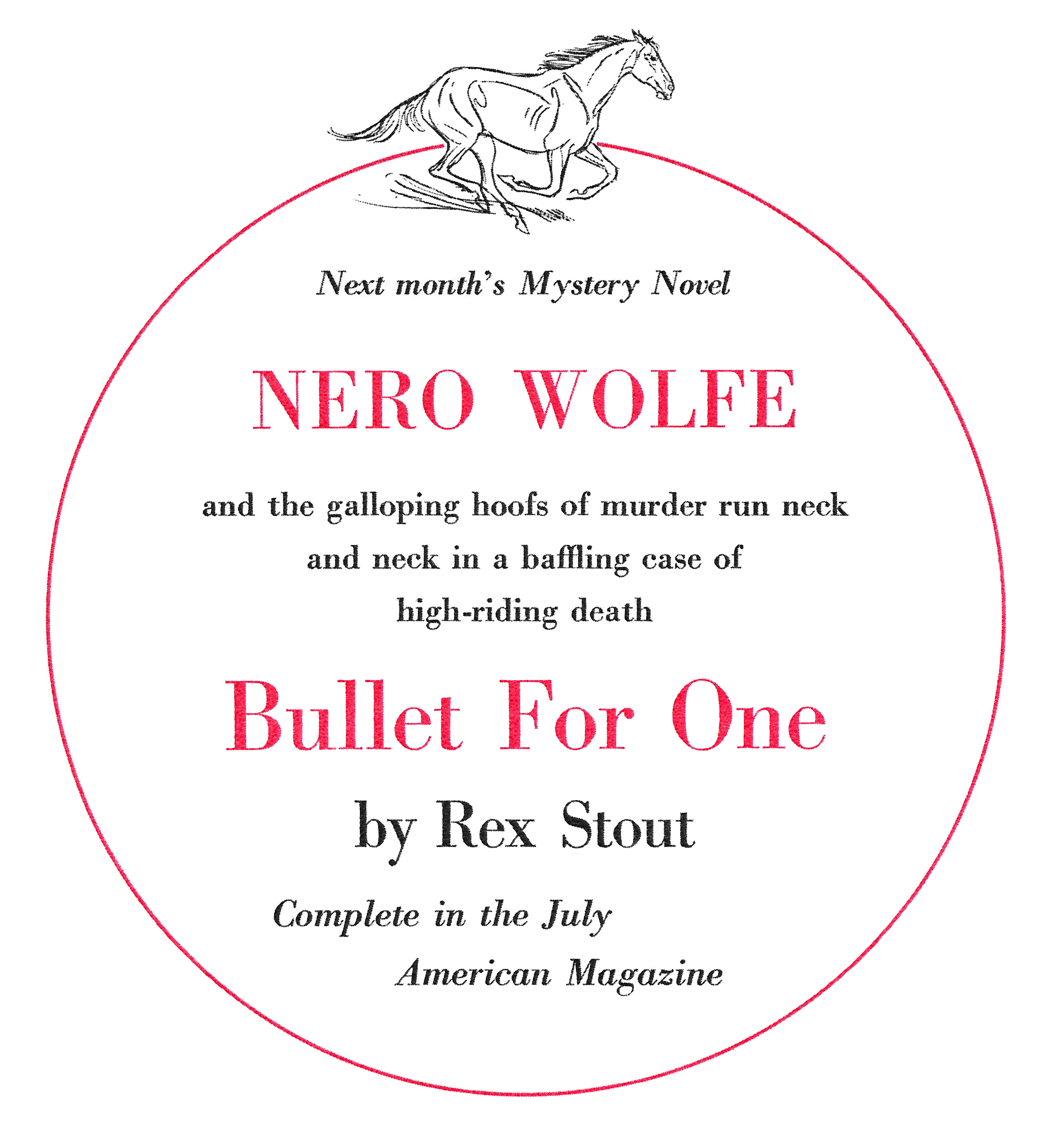
- Promotional teaser for "Bullet for One" in the June 1948 issue of The American Magazine
- Country: United States
- Language: English
- Genre: Detective fiction

Publication
- Published in: The American Magazine
- Publication type: Periodical
- Publication date: July 1948
- Series: Nero Wolfe

"Bullet for One" is a Nero Wolfe mystery novella by Rex Stout, first published in the July 1948 issue of The American Magazine. It first appeared in book form in the short-story collection Curtains for Three, published by the Viking Press in 1951.

== Plot summary ==
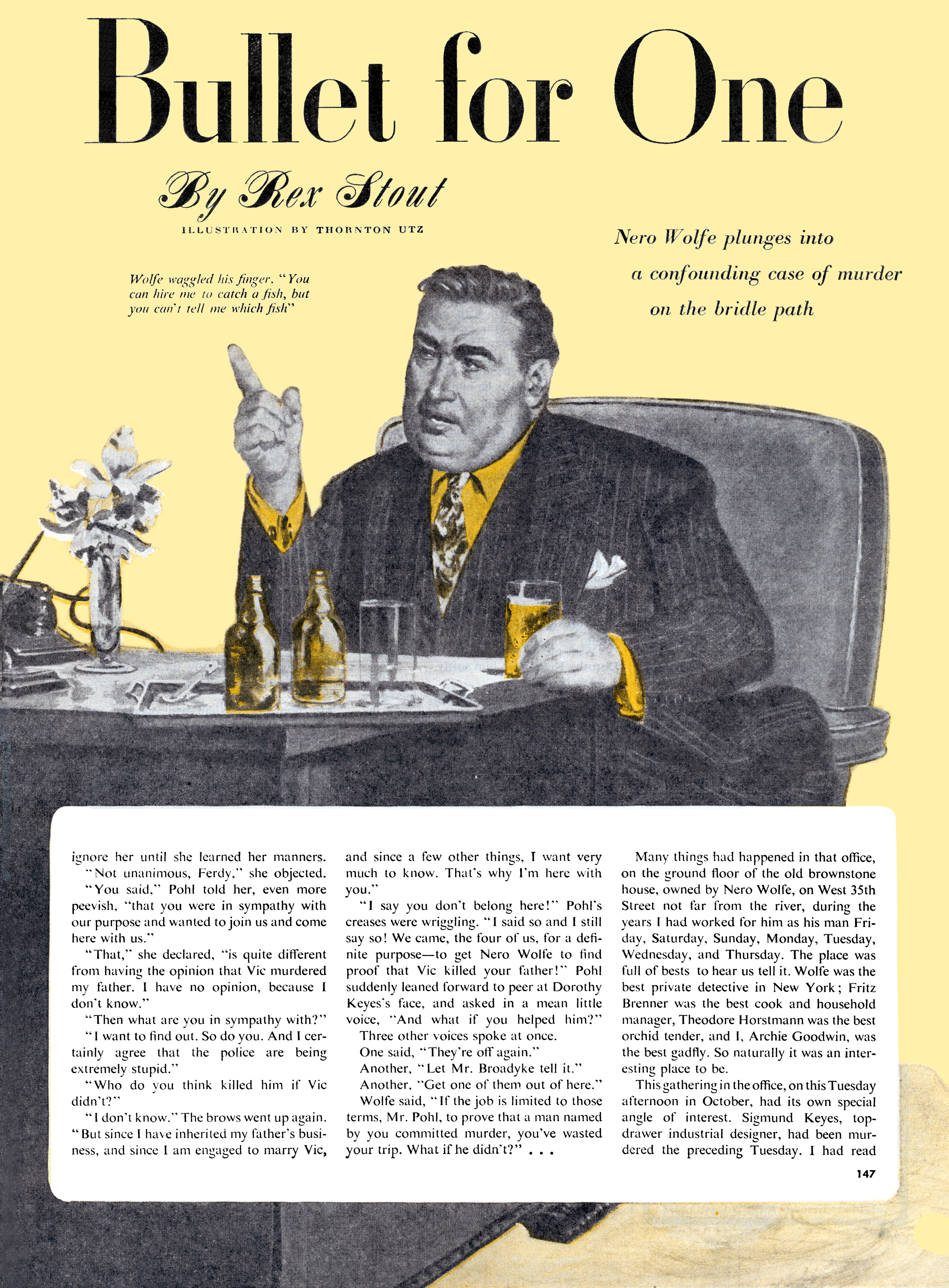
Thornton Utz illustrated "Bullet for One" for The American Magazine (July 1948)

Wolfe and Archie investigate the week-old murder of industrial designer Sigmund Keyes at the request of five people who worked closely with him: Ferdinand Pohl, Frank Broadyke, Wayne Safford, Audrey Rooney, and Keyes' daughter Dorothy. They believe that Victor Talbott, his sales agent, committed the murder, and want the truth to come out so that the police will stop harassing them.

Keyes had frequently gone horseback riding in a local park during the early morning, and Talbott sometimes accompanied him. On the day of Keyes' death, a mounted policeman had seen him on his usual path; not long afterward, the horse emerged from the park with no rider. Keyes' body had been found in a thicket near the path, shot in the chest. Wolfe agrees to find the murderer, regardless of his/her identity, just before Talbott himself arrives at the office. He explains that Keyes had invited him to ride that morning, but he declined in order to sleep in at the hotel where he had been staying. The meeting is briefly interrupted by Inspector Cramer's attempt to enter the brownstone, but Archie refuses him entry and returns to find Safford and Talbott fighting in the office. He breaks up the fight and throws Talbott out.

None of the six has an airtight alibi, and all will benefit from Keyes' death in various ways. Dorothy stands to inherit his business and no longer has to deal with his objection to her romantic relationship with Talbott; Pohl was unhappy with the return on his investment in Keyes' business; Broadyke, one of Keyes' professional rivals, was being sued by Keyes for using stolen designs; Audrey, Talbott's secretary, had been accused by Keyes of being Broadyke's accomplice in the theft; and Safford, a stable hand at the riding academy where Keyes kept his horse, had gotten into a fistfight with him over his treatment of Audrey.

Wolfe brings Saul Panzer and Orrie Cather in on the case and sends Archie to meet with Officer Hefferan, the mounted policeman who saw Keyes on the path. Hefferan was too far away to see Keyes' face, but recognized his horse, riding outfit, and behavior in the saddle. Calling in to update Wolfe, Archie receives instructions to meet Pohl at Keyes' office and stop him from pestering Wolfe. Pohl provides Archie with a list of Talbott's most recent out-of-town business trips, having been instructed to do so by Wolfe; they are interrupted by the arrival of Talbott and Dorothy, and Pohl and Talbott begin to fight before Dorothy has them both arrested. Audrey arrives next with news that Safford has been arrested as a material witness, and Sergeant Purley Stebbins quickly takes her into custody as well. Broadyke has been arrested on a charge of receiving stolen goods, leaving Dorothy as the only one of the six principals still at liberty.

She reveals that she has forged checks in Keyes' name and is terrified that his lawyer will use this fact against her, but Wolfe has no advice to give her and sends her away. While closing up the office for the night, Archie finds a note from Wolfe stating that the case is now closed; the next morning, he is surprised to find Cramer on the stoop when he returns from doing errands. Wolfe explains that he will soon be able to turn Keyes' murderer over to the police. The following morning, Wolfe stages a demonstration in which one of the principals is chosen to dress in a duplicate of Keyes' riding outfit, use his horse, and copy his mannerisms while riding through the park. Hefferan cannot tell this figure from the one he saw on the morning of Keyes' murder, and the rider tries to flee only to be caught by several mounted officers.

Talbott had in fact murdered Keyes and was the one chosen to stand in for him. Wolfe used the list provided by Pohl to track down tailors in the cities Talbott had visited, find the one that made a duplicate of Keyes' outfit, and have him make another one for the demonstration. Talbott had constructed his alibi in order to allow himself a chance to slip away from the hotel, shoot Keyes before he ever started his ride, impersonate him to fool Hefferan, and get back to the hotel without raising suspicion.

== Publication history ==
=== "Bullet for One" ===
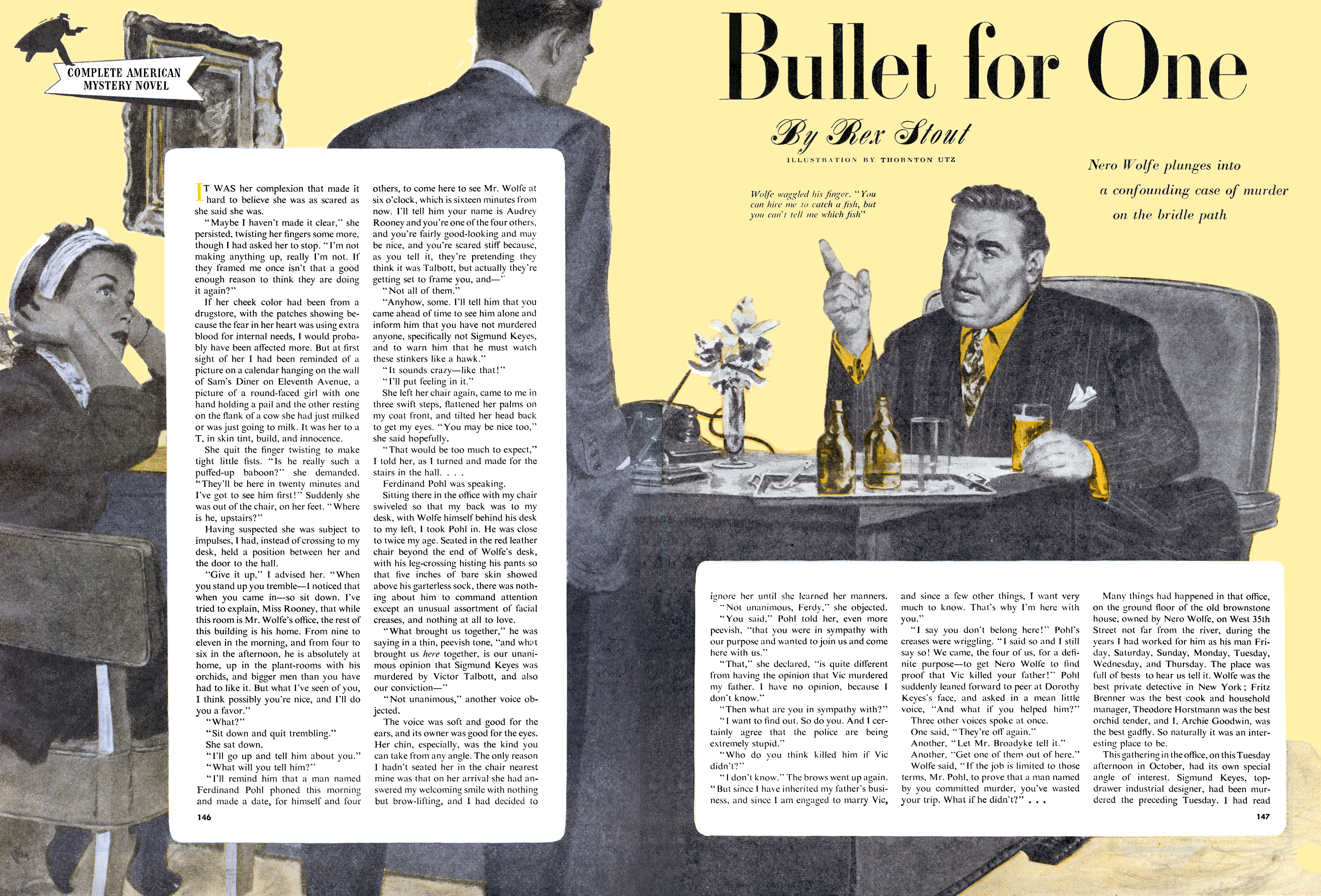

- 1948, The American Magazine, July 1948
- 1950, Ellery Queen's Mystery Magazine, June 1950
- 1970, Crimes and Misfortunes, ed. by . Francis McComas, New York: Random House, 1970
- 1970, Ellery Queen's Anthology, 1970
- 1978, The Great American Detective, ed. by William Kittredge and Steven M. Krauzer, New York: New American Library, October 1978

=== Curtains for Three ===
- 1951, New York: The Viking Press, February 23, 1951, hardcover

Contents include "The Gun with Wings", "Bullet for One" and "Disguise for Murder".
In his limited-edition pamphlet, Collecting Mystery Fiction #9, Rex Stout's Nero Wolfe Part I, Otto Penzler describes the first edition of Curtains for Three: "Gray cloth, front cover printed with red lettering (and decoration on front cover only) and black rules; rear cover blank. Issued in a black, orange and white dust wrapper."
In April 2006, Firsts: The Book Collector's Magazine estimated that the first edition of Curtains for Three had a value of between $300 and $500. The estimate is for a copy in very good to fine condition in a like dustjacket.

- 1951, New York: Viking (Mystery Guild), 1951, hardcover

The far less valuable Viking book club edition may be distinguished from the first edition in three ways:

- The dust jacket has "Book Club Edition" printed on the inside front flap, and the price is absent (first editions may be price clipped if they were given as gifts).
- Book club editions are sometimes thinner and always taller (usually a quarter of an inch) than first editions.
- Book club editions are bound in cardboard, and first editions are bound in cloth (or have at least a cloth spine).

- 1951, London: Collins Crime Club, October 22, 1951, hardcover
- 1955, New York: The Viking Press, Full House: A Nero Wolfe Omnibus (with The League of Frightened Men and And Be a Villain), May 15, 1955, hardcover
- 1966, New York: Bantam #F3063, June 1966, paperback
- 1995, New York: Bantam ISBN 0-553-76294-X January 2, 1995, paperback
- 1997, Newport Beach, California: Books on Tape, Inc. ISBN 0-7366-3747-8 July 21, 1997, audio cassette (unabridged, read by Michael Prichard)
- 2010, New York: Bantam ISBN 978-0-307-75582-7 May 12, 2010, e-book
