= Disguise for Murder =

- Short story by Rex Stout
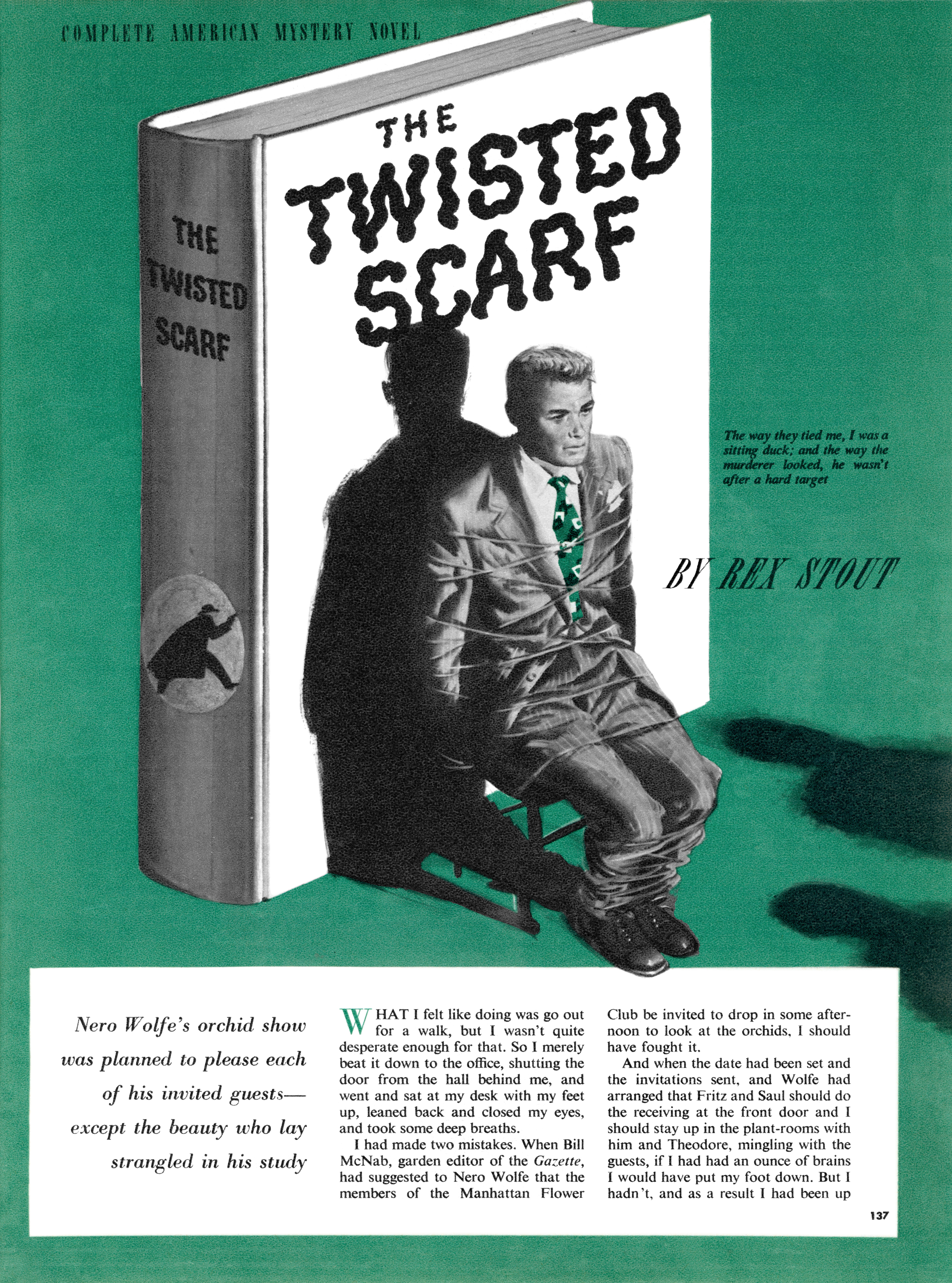
- Illustrated by Thornton Utz
- Original title: The Twisted Scarf
- Country: United States
- Language: English
- Genre: Detective fiction

Publication
- Published in: The American Magazine
- Publication type: Periodical
- Publication date: September 1950
- Series: Nero Wolfe

"Disguise for Murder" is a Nero Wolfe mystery novella by American writer Rex Stout, first published as "The Twisted Scarf" in the September 1950 issue of The American Magazine. It first appeared in book form in the short-story collection Curtains for Three, published by the Viking Press in 1951. The story has been adapted for radio and television.

== Plot ==
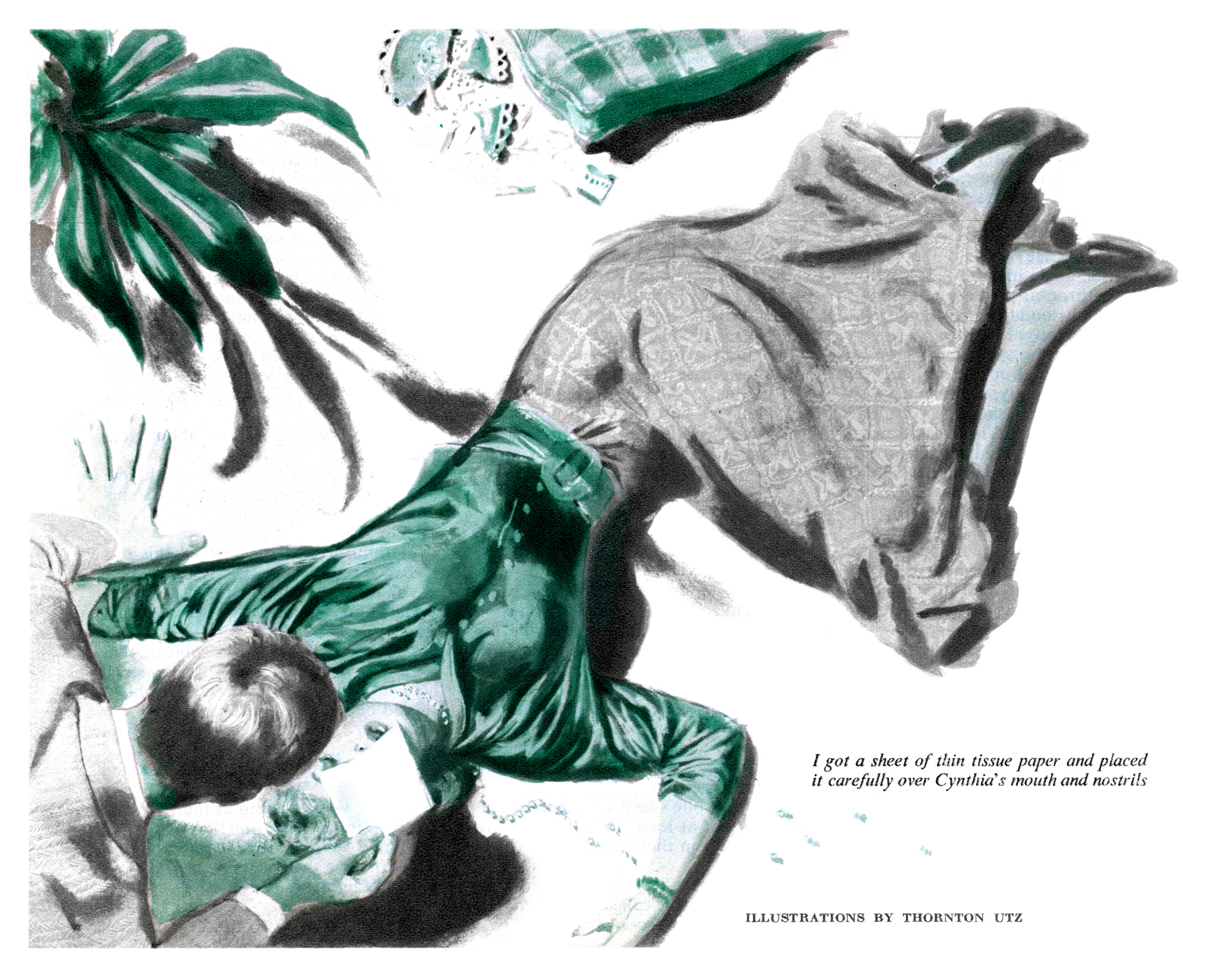
I got a sheet of thin tissue paper and placed it carefully over Cynthia's mouth and nostrils

Wolfe and Archie are hosting a gathering of the Manhattan Flower Club in the orchid rooms, with Fritz Brenner and Saul Panzer checking guests in/out and handling their hats and coats. Archie slips downstairs to the office for a break, only to be interrupted when a young woman enters after him. She identifies herself as Cynthia Brown, but admits that this is one of several aliases that she uses as a confidence artist. She tells Archie about Doris Hatten, a friend of hers who was strangled to death five months earlier, and a man she had seen entering Doris' apartment that day. She did not tell the police about him at the time, but she has seen the man among the guests and is asking for Wolfe's help in persuading him to leave her alone. However, Wolfe insists that Archie return upstairs to look after the guests. At the end of the gathering, they learn that Cynthia has been strangled to death in the office.

Wolfe, Archie, Fritz, and Saul keep all the remaining guests from leaving so that the police can question them. Among them are Mimi Orwin, a wealthy woman that Cynthia had been swindling; Percy Brown, Cynthia's partner in the scam; and food company executive Homer N. Carlisle and his wife, the latter of whom found the body. Inspector Cramer comments that Doris had no visible means of support, speculating that a man may have been paying the rent on her apartment. During the course of questioning all the guests, he has his men examine the office and seal it off to spite Wolfe.

Once the police and guests have departed, Wolfe muses on the character of the murderer, concluding that this person would take on the challenge of waiting until Cynthia's body was found in hopes of learning what she might have told Archie. He composes a note and has Archie mail it to one person - the one he believes to be the murderer, based on Archie's report of his conversation with Cynthia. The note claims that Cynthia told Archie enough to let him identify the culprit, and that he wants a face-to-face meeting in order to decide what to do with that information.

The next morning, he receives a phone call in which a male voice summons him to a particular address that night. Upon arrival, he is tied to a chair and relieved of his gun by Skinny and W-J, two men working for the murderer. Archie offers to keep silent on Cynthia's murder in exchange for $50,000 and warns that Wolfe will give all information on the case to the police if he does not return home safely by midnight. He announces the murderer's identity to Skinny and W-J as Mrs. Carlisle, disguised as a man; these two manage to restrain her, but she shoots and wounds both Archie and W-J.

Once the case is closed and the office has been unsealed, Wolfe explains to Cramer the details that allowed him to deduce Mrs. Carlisle's guilt. Cynthia had said to Archie that she never would have recognized Doris' killer among the guests in the orchid rooms if he had not been wearing his hat. All of the men had left their hats in the front room when they arrived, but the women kept theirs on. Wolfe realized from Cynthia's statement that the culprit was a woman who had disguised herself on the day of Doris' murder, and who had kept her hat on during the Manhattan Flower Club gathering out of habit. Mimi and Mrs. Carlisle were the only women who stayed until the body was found, and Mimi's build would have made it difficult to pass herself off convincingly as a man. Carlisle had been paying Doris' rent and carrying on a love affair with her, and Mrs. Carlisle donned his clothing and acquired a key in order to enter the apartment and kill her out of jealousy.

== Adaptations ==
=== Nero Wolfe (A&E Network) ===
"Wolfe Stays In" was released on DVD for the first time in April 2010

"Disguise for Murder" was adapted for the first season of the A&E TV series A Nero Wolfe Mystery (2001–2002). Directed by John L'Ecuyer from a teleplay by Sharon Elizabeth Doyle, the episode made its debut June 3, 2001, on A&E.

Timothy Hutton is Archie Goodwin; Maury Chaykin is Nero Wolfe. Other members of the cast (in credits order) include Bill Smitrovich (Inspector Cramer), Saul Rubinek (Lon Cohen), Colin Fox (Fritz Brenner), James Tolkan (W.J.), Debra Monk (Mrs. Carlisle), Kathryn Zenna (Cynthia Brown), Trent McMullen (Orrie Cather), Conrad Dunn (Saul Panzer), R.D. Reid (Sergeant Purley Stebbins), Aron Tager (Mr. Carlisle), Nicholas Campbell (Colonel Percy Brown), Nancy Beatty (Mrs. Orwin), Philip Craig (Gene Orwin), Beau Starr (Malcolm Vedder), Richard Waugh (Dr. Morley) and Ken Kramer (Dr. Vollmer).

In addition to original music by Nero Wolfe composer Michael Small, the soundtrack includes music by Ib Glindemann (titles), (Note: Ib Glindemann, "Moonlight Promenade". Carlin Production Music, CAR 202, Big Band - Jazz - Swing (track 10).) David Cabrera and Phil McArthur (opening sequence), (Note: David Cabrera and Phil McArthur, "Zoot Suit Blues". Koka Media, KOK 2188, Back in the Swing of Things (track 7).) and Danny Baker. (Note: Danny Baker, "Martiniville". OneMusic, Woody Jazz (track 15).)

In international broadcasts, the episodes "Eeny Meeny Murder Mo" and "Disguise for Murder" are linked and expanded into a 90-minute widescreen telefilm titled "Wolfe Stays In." (Note: Sky Movies (UK) summary retrieved October 4, 2007; run length of "Wolfe Stays In" is recorded as 90 minutes. Program listings for Saturday, November 6, 2004, broadcast on Sky Movies 6 records broadcast as widescreen format.) The two episodes are connected by scenes of Archie playing poker with Saul, Orrie and Lon — extensions of the Stout originals written by head writer and consulting producer Sharon Doyle.

"These poker scenes were put in for marketing reasons," executive producer Michael Jaffe told Scarlet Street magazine. "Nero Wolfe airs as a two-hour show overseas and the two episodes had to be tied together. So we looked for ways to do that. We've heard Archie talk about poker a million times. So there was nothing abnormal about seeing them play poker, except that we don't see them do it in the book."

A Nero Wolfe Mystery began to be released on Region 2 DVD in 2009, marketed in the Netherlands by Just Entertainment. The third collection (EAN 8717344739481), released in April 2010, made the 90-minute features "Wolfe Goes Out" and "Wolfe Stays In" available on home video for the first time. Until then, the linked episodes "Door to Death"/"Christmas Party" and "Eeny Meeny Murder Mo"/"Disguise for Murder" were available only in the abbreviated form sold in North America by A&E Home Video (ISBN 0-7670-8893-X). These DVD releases present the episodes in 4:3 pan and scan rather than their 16:9 aspect ratio for widescreen viewing, and are not offered in high-definition video.

=== Nero Wolfe (CBC Radio) ===
"Disguise for Murder" was adapted as the premiere episode of the Canadian Broadcasting Corporation's 13-part radio series Nero Wolfe (1982), starring Mavor Moore as Nero Wolfe, Don Francks as Archie Goodwin and Cec Linder as Inspector Cramer. Written and directed by Toronto actor and producer Ron Hartmann, the hour-long adaptation aired on CBC Stereo January 16, 1982, with guest stars Fiona Reid, Jack Creley and Neil Munro.

== Publication history ==
=== "Disguise for Murder" ===
- 1950, The American Magazine, September 1950, as "The Twisted Scarf"
- 1951, Ellery Queen's Mystery Magazine, April 1951, as "The Affair of the Twisted Scarf"
- 1964, Ellery Queen's Anthology, 1964, as "The Affair of the Twisted Scarf"
- 1975, Alfred Hitchcock Presents: Stories to be Read with the Door Locked, ed. by Alfred Hitchcock, New York: Random House, 1975, as "The Affair of the Twisted Scarf"

=== Curtains for Three ===
- 1951, New York: The Viking Press, February 23, 1951, hardcover

Contents include "The Gun with Wings", "Bullet for One" and "Disguise for Murder".
In his limited-edition pamphlet, Collecting Mystery Fiction #9, Rex Stout's Nero Wolfe Part I, Otto Penzler describes the first edition of Curtains for Three: "Gray cloth, front cover printed with red lettering (and decoration on front cover only) and black rules; rear cover blank. Issued in a black, orange and white dust wrapper."
In April 2006, Firsts: The Book Collector's Magazine estimated that the first edition of Curtains for Three had a value of between $300 and $500. The estimate is for a copy in very good to fine condition in a like dustjacket.

- 1951, New York: Viking (Mystery Guild), 1951, hardcover (Note: The far less valuable Viking book club edition may be distinguished from the first edition in three ways: The dust jacket has "Book Club Edition" printed on the inside front flap, and the price is absent (first editions may be price clipped if they were given as gifts).; Book club editions are sometimes thinner and always taller (usually a quarter of an inch) than first editions.; Book club editions are bound in cardboard, and first editions are bound in cloth (or have at least a cloth spine).)
- 1951, London: Collins Crime Club, October 22, 1951, hardcover
- 1955, New York: The Viking Press, Full House: A Nero Wolfe Omnibus (with The League of Frightened Men and And Be a Villain), May 15, 1955, hardcover
- 1966, New York: Bantam #F3063, June 1966, paperback
- 1995, New York: Bantam ISBN 0-553-76294-X January 2, 1995, paperback
- 1997, Newport Beach, California: Books on Tape, Inc. ISBN 0-7366-3747-8 July 21, 1997, audio cassette (unabridged, read by Michael Prichard)
- 2010, New York: Bantam ISBN 978-0-307-75582-7 May 12, 2010, e-book
