= The Gun with Wings =

- Short story by Rex Stout
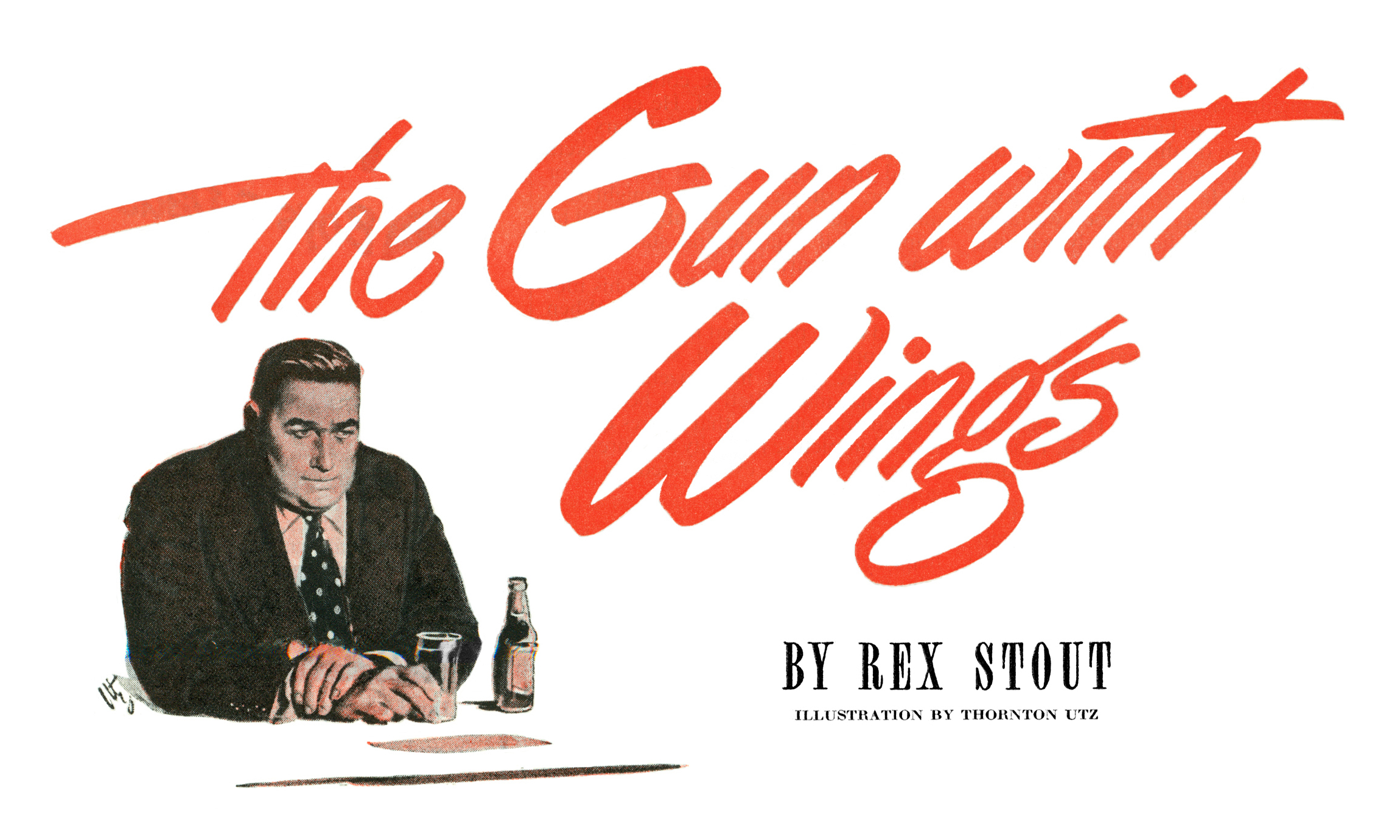
- Illustrated by Thornton Utz
- Country: United States
- Language: English
- Genre: Detective fiction

Publication
- Published in: The American Magazine
- Publication type: Periodical
- Publication date: December 1949
- Series: Nero Wolfe

"The Gun with Wings" is a Nero Wolfe mystery novella by Rex Stout, first published in the December 1949 issue of The American Magazine. It first appeared in book form in the short-story collection Curtains for Three, published by the Viking Press in 1951.

== Plot ==
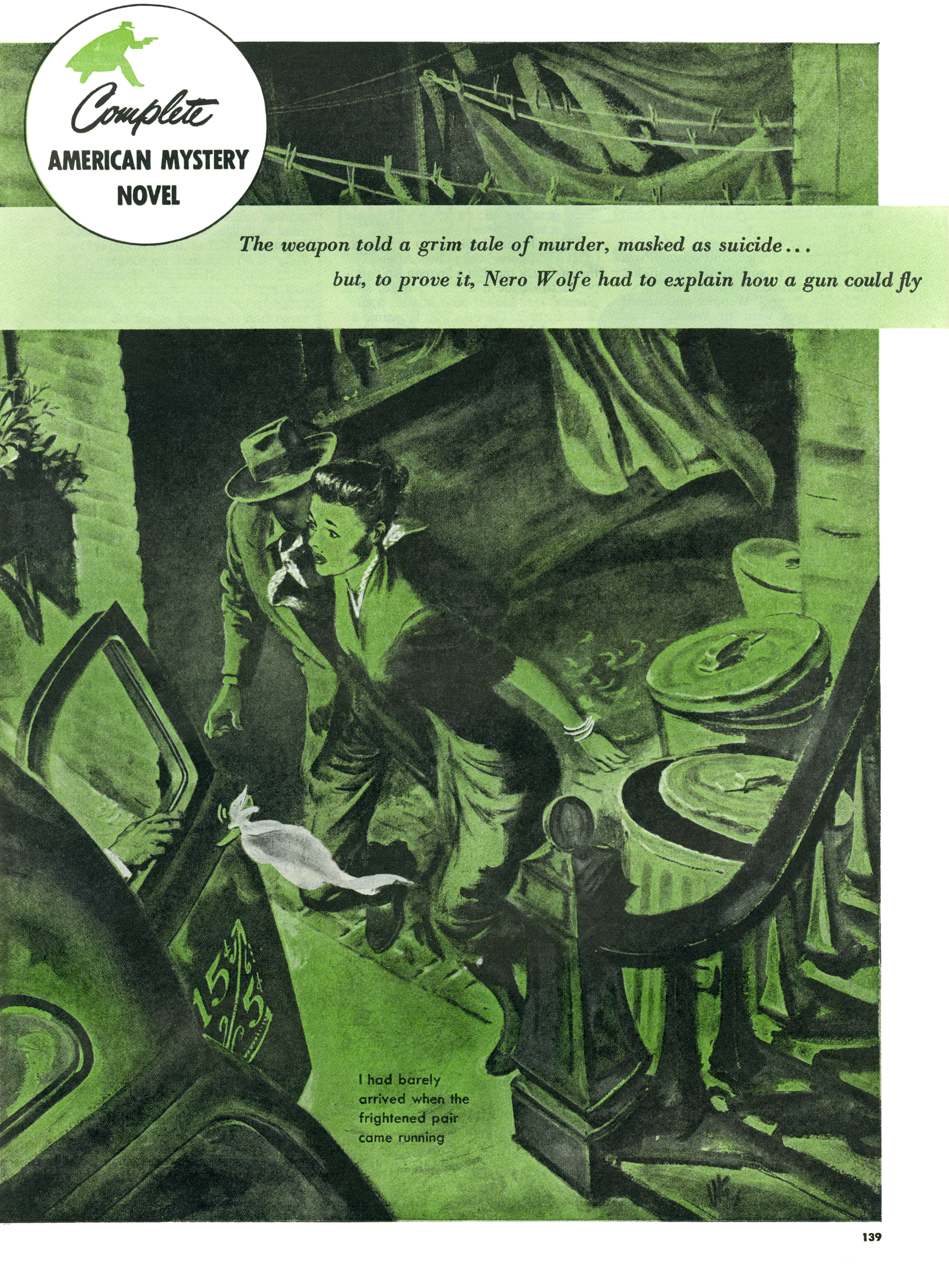
Thornton Utz illustrated "The Gun with Wings" for The American Magazine (December 1949)

Margaret "Peggy" Mion, widow of opera tenor Alberto Mion, and Frederick Weppler, the music critic for the Gazette, ask Wolfe to investigate Mion's death from four months earlier. His body had been found in his apartment's soundproof practice studio, shot through the roof of the mouth. The police have ruled the case a suicide, but Peggy insists that Mion never would have been able to kill himself even though she was thinking of leaving him for Weppler. She pays Wolfe a $5,000 retainer to find out the truth so that she and Weppler can put their minds at ease and start a life together.

Six weeks prior to Mion's death, baritone Gifford James had learned from his daughter Clara that Mion had seduced her, and he punched Mion in the neck out of anger. The blow injured Mion's larynx, requiring an operation, and he was having trouble regaining full use of his voice. On the day of his death, he held a conference with James and several other individuals who were professionally affected by the incident, to discuss the issue of restitution to be paid by James. Among them was Dr. Nicholas Lloyd, the surgeon who performed the operation. Some time after the conference ended, Weppler and Peggy visited the apartment to confront Mion about their love for each other, only to find him dead in the studio.

The police report states that Mion's gun was found on the floor next to the body, rather than at the base of a bust of Enrico Caruso that was placed across the studio. However, Weppler and Peggy insist that it was not on the floor when they entered. Wolfe believes they are lying, but proceeds with a plan to bring the involved parties to his office by sending out notices that Peggy plans to sue James for damages on behalf of Mion's estate. During this meeting, Clara reveals that she had made up the story she told her father about Mion's seducing her. Lloyd had called on a professional colleague to get a second opinion regarding Mion's prognosis that would confirm his own.

The next day, Inspector Cramer visits the brownstone at Wolfe's request. Wolfe surprises Archie by openly telling Cramer of his belief that Mion was murdered, even though he has no evidence to support it. Cramer is incensed, but reluctantly agrees to go along with Wolfe's suggestion that Weppler and Peggy be arrested as material witnesses. They are released on bail the following day but find themselves being followed by the police, and they come to see Wolfe in a panic. Weppler admits that he had seen the gun at the Caruso bust and put it on the floor to divert suspicion from himself and Peggy, but Wolfe hypothesizes that the gun had originally been on the floor but was previously moved by someone else.

Archie tricks Clara into admitting that she had entered the studio using her own key, arriving just before Weppler and Peggy, found the gun on the floor, and moved it to the bust in order to implicate Peggy. She refuses to sign a statement to that effect brought by Archie, so he instead has her sign a note documenting her refusal. At the brownstone, Wolfe uses the note to forge Clara's signature on the statement and then calls Cramer, Sergeant Purley Stebbins, and everyone involved to his office so he can close the case.

The murderer is Lloyd, who had begun to think that his reputation would be destroyed by Mion's slow recovery and/or an error he might have made during the operation. With assistance from Archie and James, Wolfe demonstrates the manner in which Lloyd could have killed Mion without any resistance. Lloyd had asked Mion to open his mouth for a throat examination; as he did so, his eyes naturally tilted upward toward the ceiling, and Lloyd was able to put the gun in Mion's mouth and fire without being seen. Lloyd runs for the door but is caught by Cramer and Stebbins, and Archie takes advantage of the ensuing chaos to slip out of the office and get himself a glass of milk.

=== Trivia ===
In chapter 2, Archie makes either a mistake or a deliberate error in his statement:

"Granted that you're dead right," I observed, "which is not what you call apodictical, someday we ought to make up a list of the clients that have sat here and lied to us. There was Mike Walsh, and Calida Frost, and that cafeteria guy, Pratt — oh, dozens. But their money was good, and I didn't get so far behind with my notes that I couldn't catch up. All that for nothing?"

Only Calida Frost (The Red Box) fit the description. Mike Walsh (The Rubber Band) and Pratt (Some Buried Caesar) had not lied to Wolfe, and as far as the published stories, Pratt had never been to Wolfe's office.

== Publication history ==
=== "The Gun with Wings" ===
- 1949, The American Magazine, June 1949
- 1965, Ellery Queen's Mystery Magazine, March 1965
- 1972, Ellery Queen's Anthology, Spring–Summer 1972
- 1977, Masterpieces of Mystery: The Golden Age, Part Two, ed. by Ellery Queen, New York: Davis Publications, 1977
- 1988, Murder at the Opera, ed. by Thomas Godfrey, London: Michael O'Mara Books Ltd, 1988

=== Curtains for Three ===
- 1951, New York: The Viking Press, February 23, 1951, hardcover

Contents include "The Gun with Wings", "Bullet for One" and "Disguise for Murder".
In his limited-edition pamphlet, Collecting Mystery Fiction #9, Rex Stout's Nero Wolfe Part I, Otto Penzler describes the first edition of Curtains for Three: "Gray cloth, front cover printed with red lettering (and decoration on front cover only) and black rules; rear cover blank. Issued in a black, orange and white dust wrapper."
In April 2006, Firsts: The Book Collector's Magazine estimated that the first edition of Curtains for Three had a value of between $300 and $500. The estimate is for a copy in very good to fine condition in a like dustjacket.

- 1951, New York: Viking (Mystery Guild), 1951, hardcover

The far less valuable Viking book club edition may be distinguished from the first edition in three ways:

- The dust jacket has "Book Club Edition" printed on the inside front flap, and the price is absent (first editions may be price clipped if they were given as gifts).
- Book club editions are sometimes thinner and always taller (usually a quarter of an inch) than first editions.
- Book club editions are bound in cardboard, and first editions are bound in cloth (or have at least a cloth spine).

- 1951, London: Collins Crime Club, October 22, 1951, hardcover
- 1955, New York: The Viking Press, Full House: A Nero Wolfe Omnibus (with The League of Frightened Men and And Be a Villain), May 15, 1955, hardcover
- 1966, New York: Bantam #F3063, June 1966, paperback
- 1995, New York: Bantam ISBN 0-553-76294-X January 2, 1995, paperback
- 1997, Newport Beach, California: Books on Tape, Inc. ISBN 0-7366-3747-8 July 21, 1997, audio cassette (unabridged, read by Michael Prichard)
- 2010, New York: Bantam ISBN 978-0-307-75582-7 May 12, 2010, e-book
