= Three Doors to Death =

- Author: Rex Stout
- Cover artist: Bill English
- Language: English
- Series: Nero Wolfe
- Genre: Detective fiction
- Publisher: Viking Press
- Publication date: April 21, 1950
- Publication place: United States
- Media type: Print (hardcover)
- Pages: 244 pp. (first edition)
- OCLC: 1650685
- Preceded by: The Second Confession
- Followed by: In the Best Families

Three Doors to Death is a collection of Nero Wolfe mystery novellas by Rex Stout, published by the Viking Press in 1950 — itself collected in the omnibus volume Five of a Kind (Viking 1961). The book comprises three stories that first appeared in The American Magazine:

- "Man Alive" (December 1947)
- "Omit Flowers" (November 1948)
- "Door to Death" (June 1949)

== Publication history ==
- 1950, New York: The Viking Press, April 21, 1950, hardcover

In his limited-edition pamphlet, Collecting Mystery Fiction #9, Rex Stout's Nero Wolfe Part I, Otto Penzler describes the first edition of Three Doors to Death: "Green cloth, front cover and spine printed with black; rear cover blank. Issued in a mainly reddish-orange dust wrapper."
In April 2006, Firsts: The Book Collector's Magazine estimated that the first edition of Three Doors to Death had a value of between $300 and $500. The estimate is for a copy in very good to fine condition in a like dustjacket.

- 1950, New York: Viking (Mystery Guild), August 1950, hardcover

The far less valuable Viking book club edition may be distinguished from the first edition in three ways:

- The dust jacket has "Book Club Edition" printed on the inside front flap, and the price is absent (first editions may be price clipped if they were given as gifts).
- Book club editions are sometimes thinner and always taller (usually a quarter of an inch) than first editions.
- Book club editions are bound in cardboard, and first editions are bound in cloth (or have at least a cloth spine).

- 1950, London: Collins Crime Club, September 18, 1950, hardcover
- 1952, New York: Dell (mapback by Rafael de Soto), 1952, #626, paperback
- 1961, New York: The Viking Press, Five of a Kind: The Third Nero Wolfe Omnibus (with The Rubber Band and In the Best Families), July 10, 1961, hardcover
- 1966, New York: Bantam #F3154, June 1966, paperback
- 1995, New York: Bantam Crimeline ISBN 0-553-25127-9 February 1995, paperback
- 2010, New York: Bantam Crimeline ISBN 0-307-75623-8 June 9, 2010, e-book
