= The Second Confession =

1949 novel by Rex Stout

- Author: Rex Stout
- Cover artist: Bill English
- Language: English
- Series: Nero Wolfe
- Genre: Detective fiction
- Publisher: Viking Press
- Publication date: September 6, 1949
- Publication place: United States
- Media type: Print (Hardcover)
- Pages: 245 pp. (first edition)
- OCLC: 1468849
- Preceded by: Trouble in Triplicate
- Followed by: Three Doors to Death

The Second Confession is a detective novel by American author Rex Stout, featuring the character Nero Wolfe. The book was first published by the Viking Press in 1949. The story was also collected in other omnibus volumes, including Triple Zeck (Viking 1974). This is the second of three Nero Wolfe novels that involve crime boss Arnold Zeck – Wolfe's Professor Moriarty. In this novel he telephones Wolfe to warn him off an investigation and retaliates when Wolfe refuses to cooperate. Though the crime is solved, the ending is left open.

== Plot summary ==
Wealthy James U. Sperling approaches Nero Wolfe to investigate Louis Rony, an admirer of Sperling's younger daughter Gwenn. Sperling wants Wolfe to find evidence that Rony is a member of the American Communist Party. Wolfe is reluctant since he believes Rony has connections to “Z”, a shadowy criminal mastermind who has crossed Wolfe's path before in the 1948 book And Be a Villain. Nevertheless, Wolfe's assistant Archie Goodwin is dispatched undercover to Sperling's Westchester estate to see if he can discover any grounds to convince Gwenn to break off the relationship.

Present at Sperling's estate are his family, including his wife, his son and two daughters; Rony himself; Paul Emerson, a controversial conservative radio commentator who is sponsored by Sperling's corporation; and Webster Kane, an economist and friend of the family. Madeline, the eldest daughter, reveals that she is aware of Archie's true identity, having read about his exploits with Wolfe and nursed a crush on him. That night, Archie plans to drug Rony, but when he switches drinks he discovers that Rony's drink was already spiked.

The next night, Archie offers to drive Rony back to New York, but instead arranges for Wolfe's operatives, Saul Panzer and Ruth Brady, to pose as robbers and waylay them. Once Rony is knocked unconscious, Archie searches him and discovers a membership card for the Communist Party under the name of William Reynolds. Returning to New York, Archie learns from Wolfe that “Z” has given Wolfe a deadline to withdraw from the case. After the deadline passes, the greenhouse on the roof of Wolfe's house is attacked with machine-gun fire, destroying many of the orchids there.

Wolfe meets with Sperling and his family and explains that while he cannot necessarily prove that Rony is a Communist, he can prove that Rony is a member of “Z”’s criminal organisation, but it is Gwenn’s decision whether he is to proceed. That night, while everyone is awaiting it, Gwenn goes missing, prompting Archie and Madeline to search the grounds for her. Gwenn is found and reveals that she has contacted Rony and asked him to meet with her so that she can break off their relationship. Following this, Archie discovers Rony’s body; he has been hit by a car and moved into bushes away from the estate’s driveway.

When investigators arrive, evidence is found on Wolfe’s car that it was the one used to run over Rony, and therefore Archie is suspected. Then Webster Kane steps forward, claiming to have borrowed Wolfe’s car the previous night and to have accidentally run over Rony in the dark. Satisfied by Kane’s confession, the investigators prepare to rule Rony’s death an accident, but when Sperling attempts to pay Wolfe off, Wolfe becomes convinced that Kane’s confession is false and determines to discover what really happened.

Later, an anonymous package arrives at Wolfe's house, containing $50,000 cash by way of reparation from “Z”. But on his weekly radio broadcast, Emerson ridicules Wolfe and his investigation and Archie is sent to the Sperling estate to locate evidence that Rony was struck down before being run over. There Archie discovers a stone that is later proved to be the weapon. Wolfe now contacts Lon Cohen, the city editor of the Gazette, and puts a plan into action.

Over the next three days, with information provided by a secret contact, Archie drafts and submits a series of reports detailing confidential meetings of the Communist Party, which are then published in the Gazette. Wolfe subsequently meets two senior party officials and convinces them to aid him by identifying the man they know as William Reynolds, against whom Wolfe has fabricated evidence to suggest that he is the informant to the papers.

Now Wolfe gathers the suspects and pressures Webster Kane to refute his previous confession. Once he has done so, the party leaders arrive to expose Kane as William Reynolds. It emerges that Kane fabricated the earlier confession of accidental manslaughter in order to avoid being suspected of murder after Rony had discovered that he was secretly a Communist. For payment, Wolfe demands that Sperling end Paul Emerson's contract, thus forcing Emerson off the air. “Z” calls Wolfe to congratulate him on solving the case and sends another package to offset Wolfe's expenses. The money is set aside as an emergency fund to be used should they ever have to face “Z” head-on from hiding.

== Cast of characters ==
- Nero Wolfe – The private investigator
- Archie Goodwin – Wolfe's assistant (and the narrator)
- Mr. and Mrs. James U. Sperling – Wolfe's client, the head of a large mining corporation, and his wife
- Gwenn Sperling – The younger of the Sperlings' two daughters
- Louis Rony – Attorney with some shady connections, and Gwenn's suitor
- Madeline Sperling – The Sperlings' older daughter, and Archie's love interest in this book
- James U. "Jimmy" Sperling, Jr. – The Sperlings' son
- Webster Kane – Economist, and consultant to Sperling's corporation
- Paul and Connie Emerson – Radio commentator and his wife
- Aloysius Murphy – Law partner to Rony
- Lon Cohen – Of the Gazette
- Messrs. Harvey and Stevens – Top ranking members of the American Communist party
- Cleveland Archer – District Attorney of Westchester County
- Ben Dykes – Head of the county detectives
- Lt. Con Noonan – Of the State Police

== Reviews and commentary ==
- Jacques Barzun and Wendell Hertig Taylor, A Catalogue of Crime — This, which is vintage Stout, has the memorable scenes of Archie's stay at a posh country house and putting all the owners and their in-laws at their ease. Absolutely topnotch, which means: in a class with And Be a Villain, Some Buried Caesar, and Too Many Cooks.
- Anthony Boucher, The New York Times Book Review (September 11, 1949) — Apart from the detective puzzle, much of the book is devoted to the offstage buildup of a modern Moriarty, who turns out to have almost nothing to do with the plot. The rest concerns the Communist party. Mr. Stout's anti-communism might be more novelistically effective if he gave an explanation of why his finally unmasked murderer belonged to the party, and if he showed his "Commies" engaged in any pursuit more sinister than the support of Henry Wallace. Nero Wolfe appears as a bulwark of democracy, but in this role he might be more convincing if he did not cause the suppression of a radio commentator with whom he disagrees.
- Saturday Review of Literature (October 15, 1949) — Stylish, timely, and brilliantly plotted, with Archie and his boss functioning at full speed — Nero even leaves home to snare killer. Very good.

== Publication history ==
- 1949, New York: The Viking Press, September 6, 1949, hardcover

In his limited-edition pamphlet, Collecting Mystery Fiction #9, Rex Stout's Nero Wolfe Part I, Otto Penzler describes the first edition of The Second Confession: "Blue-green cloth, front cover and spine printed with green-yellow; rear cover blank. Issued in a mainly blue-green dust wrapper with black and white."
In April 2006, Firsts: The Book Collector's Magazine estimated that the first edition of The Second Confession had a value of between $300 and $500. The estimate is for a copy in very good to fine condition in a like dustjacket.

- 1949, New York: Viking (Mystery Guild), December 1949, hardcover

The far less valuable Viking book club edition may be distinguished from the first edition in three ways:

- The dust jacket has "Book Club Edition" printed on the inside front flap, and the price is absent (first editions may be price clipped if they were given as gifts).
- Book club editions are sometimes thinner and always taller (usually a quarter of an inch) than first editions.
- Book club editions are bound in cardboard, and first editions are bound in cloth (or have at least a cloth spine).

- 1950, London: Collins Crime Club, April 3, 1950, hardcover
- 1950, abridged in The Montreal Standard, The Newark Evening News and The Chicago Sun-Times, 1950
- 1952, New York: Bantam #1032, September 1952, paperback
- 1964, London: Panther #1701, July 1964, paperback
- 1973, London: Tom Stacey, 1973, hardcover
- 1974, New York: The Viking Press, Triple Zeck: A Nero Wolfe Omnibus (with And Be a Villain and In the Best Families), April 5, 1974, hardcover
- 1976, London: Penguin, The First Rex Stout Omnibus ISBN 0-14-004032-3 (with The Doorbell Rang and More Deaths Than One) 1976, paperback
- 1992, London: Little, Brown and Company (UK) Ltd., ISBN 0-316-90315-9, 1992, hardcover
- 1995, New York: Bantam Crime Line ISBN 0-553-24594-5 May 1995, paperback, Rex Stout Library edition with introduction by William G. Tapply
- 2006, Auburn, California: The Audio Partners Publishing Corp., Mystery Masters ISBN 1-57270-501-9 February 9, 2006 [2000], CD (unabridged, read by Michael Prichard)
- 2010, New York: Bantam ISBN 978-0-307-75616-9 May 26, 2010, e-book
- 2016, New York: Bantam Books, The Zeck Trilogy, December 13, 2016, e-book ASIN B01M3TJSPJ
