= And Be a Villain =

1948 novel by Rex Stout

- Author: Rex Stout
- Cover artist: Bill English
- Language: English
- Series: Nero Wolfe
- Genre: Detective fiction
- Publisher: Viking Press
- Publication date: September 27, 1948
- Publication place: United States
- Media type: Print (Hardcover)
- Pages: 216 (first edition)
- OCLC: 1814980
- Preceded by: Too Many Women
- Followed by: Trouble in Triplicate

And Be a Villain (British title More Deaths Than One) is a Nero Wolfe detective novel by Rex Stout, first published by the Viking Press in 1948. The story was collected in the omnibus volumes Full House (Viking 1961) and Triple Zeck (Viking 1974).

== Plot introduction ==
"I have to talk with that girl. Go and bring her."
I had known it was coming. "Conscious?" I asked casually.
"I said with her, not to her. She must be able to talk. You could revive her after you get her here. I should have sent you in the first place, knowing how you are with young women."
"Thank you very much. She's not a young woman, she's a minor. She wears socks."
"Archie."
"Yes, sir."
"Get her."

— Wolfe and Archie discussing the recalcitrant Nancylee Shepherd, And Be a Villain, chapter 8

A radio show guest is poisoned on the air during a plug for the show's sponsor, a soft-drink manufacturer. The negative publicity, and the low bank balance at tax time, brings Nero Wolfe into the case — and into his first recorded encounter with a shadowy master criminal.

And Be a Villain is the first of three Nero Wolfe books that involve crime syndicate leader Arnold Zeck, like a Moriarty to Wolfe, and his widespread operations. The others in the Zeck Trilogy are The Second Confession and In the Best Families. In each book, Zeck telephones Wolfe to warn him off an investigation that Zeck believes will interfere with his crime syndicate. Each time, Wolfe refuses to cooperate, and anticipates that there will be consequences.

== Title ==
The title is from Act I, Scene V, line 114 of William Shakespeare's Hamlet, in which the prince says of his murderous uncle King Claudius, "That one may smile, and smile, and be a villain."

Remarking on the change from Stout's title to More Deaths Than One for the British edition, Rev. Fredrick G. Gotwald wrote, "It seems strange that the name was changed in a country from which the original came."

== Plot summary ==
Collins Crime Club released the British first edition of More Deaths Than One (And Be a Villain) on February 21, 1949, with a dustjacket design by Leslie Stead

Cyril Orchard, the publisher of the weekly horse racing sheet Track Almanac, is poisoned with cyanide during a live soft drink commercial on a popular radio talk show. A media sensation, the case attracts the attention of Nero Wolfe. Archie Goodwin is dispatched to convince the producers and sponsors to hire Wolfe to investigate the crime. The police have identified several suspects, including the show's host Madeline Fraser; her business manager, friend and former sister-in-law Deborah Koppel; her on-air side-kick Bill Meadows; Tully Strong and Nathan Straub, representatives of the show's sponsors; script-writer Elinor Vance; Nancylee Shepherd, the head of Fraser's fan-club; and F.O. Savarese, an assistant professor of mathematics and the show's other guest.

His initial investigations seem unpromising; Wolfe learns from Nancylee that the bottle of the beverage given Fraser was marked with tape around the neck. Fraser is unable to drink the beverage she was advertising because it gives her indigestion, and instead drinks iced coffee from the bottle. As the marked bottle contained the poison, this suggests that Fraser was the intended victim instead of Orchard.

Wolfe passes this information on to Inspector Cramer. When the press, prompted by Archie, criticizes him for his lack of effort, however, he is stung into further action. To Archie's surprise, Wolfe begins investigating a different murder. Beula Poole, the publisher of an independent political and economics journal, has been shot dead in her office days before. Wolfe is skeptical that two independent publishers would be murdered within weeks of each other without any link. His investigations reveal that the magazines were in fact the front for a sophisticated blackmail operation which targeted its victims using the threat of slander to compel them to purchase subscriptions for a year. This, in turn, brings Wolfe into contact with Arnold Zeck, the shadowy and powerful criminal mastermind behind the operation, who warns Wolfe not to interfere in his affairs.

After the blackmail story is published, Walter Anderson, president of the soft drink company, tries to end Wolfe's investigations by paying him off and announcing that his company is withdrawing sponsorship from Fraser's show. With no further leads, Wolfe sends Archie to Fraser and her entourage with a fake letter implicating Elinor Vance to shake a response out of the suspects. During the meeting, Deborah Koppel dies after eating a piece of candy laced with cyanide. Discovering the letter on Archie, the police threaten to charge him with obstructing justice, but they are interrupted by a phone call from a rival radio station. Wolfe has announced that he knows the identity of the murderer and threatens to reveal it on-air that night.

To avoid humiliation, the charges against Archie are dismissed and Wolfe is permitted to reveal the identity of the murderer in his office. Once the suspects have arrived, Wolfe presses Anderson to reveal the reason he tried to terminate his contract with Wolfe and Fraser's show. Anderson had discovered that Madeline Fraser had received blackmail letters, and reveals that Fraser was being accused of murdering her husband years before. However, while the blackmail syndicate had previously created false claims about their victims to slander them, in this case they had unwittingly stumbled upon the truth – Fraser had in fact murdered her husband. Fraser murdered Orchard and Poole to conceal her secret, and Koppel when she began to suspect the truth. Fraser is arrested and charged with murder. The novel ends with Wolfe receiving a phone call from Zeck, congratulating him on solving the case and warning him not to interfere in the crime lord's affairs.

== The unfamiliar word ==
"Readers of the Wolfe saga often have to turn to the dictionary because of the erudite vocabulary of Wolfe and sometimes of Archie," wrote Rev. Frederick G. Gotwald.

"Like all of us, Wolfe has his favorite words, phrases, and sayings," wrote William S. Baring-Gould. "Among the words, many are unusual and some are abstruse."

Examples of unfamiliar words — or unfamiliar uses of words that some would otherwise consider familiar — are found throughout the corpus, often in the give-and-take between Wolfe and Archie. And Be A Villain contains several examples, including the following:

- Temerarious. Chapter 15.
- Chambrer, Chapter 17. (This verb might well have been apt in the middle of the 20th century, but not toward the beginning of the 21st.)
- Fructify, Chapter 19.
- Dysgenic, Chapter 20.

== Cast of characters ==
- Nero Wolfe — The private investigator
- Archie Goodwin — Wolfe's assistant, and the narrator of all Wolfe stories
- Cyril Orchard and Beula Poole — Publishers of high priced newsletters, both murder victims
- Madeline Fraser — The host of a radio talk show and one of Wolfe's clients, also called Lena
- Deborah Koppel — Miss Fraser's manager and sister-in-law
- Bill Meadows — Miss Fraser's "sidekick" on the radio
- Elinor Vance — Scriptwriter for the show
- Tully Strong — Secretary of the show's Sponsors' Council
- F. O. Savarese — Mathematics professor who appeared on the radio show during which the first murder occurred
- Nathan Traub — Member of an advertising agency that represents the show's sponsors
- Nancylee Shepherd — Teenage organizer of a very successful Madeline Fraser fan club
- Walter Anderson — President of the firm that makes Hi-Spot
- W. T. Michaels — A medical doctor and victim of extortion
- Lon Cohen — A reporter at the Gazette
- Inspector Cramer, Lieutenant George Rowcliff, and Sergeant Purley Stebbins — Representing Manhattan Homicide

== Problematic probability ==
In Chapter 8, Professor Savarese provides a formula for the normal distribution curve, touting it as a tool that could be used in crime detection. Unfortunately, the typesetting process let the professor down. Over time, different editions of And Be a Villain represent the formula differently, changing (for example) exponents from 2 to 3. Furthermore, the equation contains a mysterious "V" which is in fact just the leftmost portion of a radical sign. A more accurate discussion of the probability density function can be found at Normal distribution.

== Reviews and commentary ==
- Jacques Barzun and Wendell Hertig Taylor, A Catalogue of Crime — A first-rate sample of the author's art, this tale brings us face to face with the radio advertising of a beverage which the lady who promotes it cannot abide. Hence hanky-panky with the bottle of substitute liquid and resulting doubt as to whom the dose was intended for. Archie is spectacular in word and deed.
- The New York Times Book Review (September 26, 1948) — The income tax has made such a dent in Nero Wolfe's bank balance that he finds it necessary to look for work instead of waiting for it to come to him as is his usual custom. He selects a case upon which the New York Police Department has been working for six days without getting anywhere, and he sends Archie Goodwin out as his envoy to persuade the people involved that it would be to their interest to employ Wolfe. The case has to do with what happened on a radio program sponsored by the manufacturers of a beverage called Hi-Spot. Cyril Orchard, a guest on the program, drank a glass of Hi-Spot and dropped dead. The other persons present drank the same beverage, but there was no cyanide in their glasses. So much, and nothing more of any consequence, is known to the police. Nobody admits to remembering who poured Orchard's drink or who handed him the glass. Archie's patience is sorely tried when weeks pass by with scarcely any progress being made. It seems to him that Wolfe is not even trying, but he is mistaken. Wolfe is thinking, and when that giant intellect goes to work let the malefactor beware. The story is enlivened by Archie's expert needling of his employer and by Wolfe's lively passages at arms with the bigwigs of the Homicide Department.
- Saturday Review of Literature (October 9, 1949) — Poisoning, in radio studio, of beverage maker's guest, provides action and needed funds for Nero Wolfe and Archie Goodwin. Nero "takes crazy dive into two-foot tank" and snares blackmail killer in hurricane off-stage finish of major adventure.

== Publication history ==
- 1948, New York: The Viking Press, September 27, 1948, hardcover

In his limited-edition pamphlet, Collecting Mystery Fiction #9, Rex Stout's Nero Wolfe Part I, Otto Penzler describes the first edition of And Be a Villain: "Gray cloth, front cover and spine printed with red lettering and green rules; rear cover blank. Issued in a black, white, red and green dust wrapper. ... With this title, The Mystery Guild began to publish the Nero Wolfe books. The cover of its [book club] edition is smooth, while the trade edition is heavily textured."
In April 2006, Firsts: The Book Collector's Magazine estimated that the first edition of And Be a Villain had a value of between $300 and $500. The estimate is for a copy in very good to fine condition in a like dustjacket.

- 1948, New York: Viking (Mystery Guild), November 1948, hardcover

The far less valuable Viking book club edition may be distinguished from the first edition in three ways:

- The dust jacket has "Book Club Edition" printed on the inside front flap, and the price is absent (first editions may be price clipped if they were given as gifts).
- Book club editions are sometimes thinner and 1950s and newer Viking BCEs are taller (usually a quarter of an inch) than first editions, but the BCE of And Be a Villain (and perhaps some other pre-1950s Viking Nero Wolfe BCEs) is the same height as the first edition.
- Book club editions are bound in cardboard, and first editions are bound in cloth (or have at least a cloth spine).

Another distinguishing characteristic of the Nero Wolfe Viking first editions is the appearance of a listing of other books by Rex Stout preceding the title page. Such a listing does not appear in the BCEs.

- 1948, New York: Book League of America, December 1948, hardcover
- 1948, Toronto: Macmillan, 1948, hardcover
- 1948, London: Collins (White Circle) #223c, 1948, paperback (as More Deaths Than One)
- 1949, London: Collins Crime Club, February 21, 1949, hardcover (as More Deaths Than One)
- 1950, New York: Bantam #824, September 1950, paperback
- 1955, New York: The Viking Press, Full House: A Nero Wolfe Omnibus (with The League of Frightened Men and Curtains for Three), May 15, 1955, hardcover
- 1958, London: Fontana #255, 1958, paperback (as More Deaths Than One)
- 1964, London: Panther, 1964, paperback (as And Be a Villain)
- 1973, London: Tom Stacey, 1973, hardcover (as More Deaths Than One)
- 1974, New York: The Viking Press, Triple Zeck: A Nero Wolfe Omnibus (with The Second Confession and In the Best Families), April 5, 1974, hardcover
- 1975, Tiptree, Essex: Severn House Publishers, 1975, hardcover (as More Deaths Than One)
- 1976, London: Penguin, The First Rex Stout Omnibus (with The Doorbell Rang and The Second Confession), 1976, paperback (as More Deaths Than One)
- 1984, New York: Bantam ISBN 0-553-23931-7 March 1984, paperback
- 1992, London: Little, Brown and Company (UK) Limited ISBN 0-316-90314-0, hardcover (as More Deaths Than One)
- 1994, New York: Bantam Crime Line ISBN 0-553-23931-7 May 1994, paperback, Rex Stout Library edition with introduction by Martin Meyers and Annette Meyers (Maan Meyers)
- 2005, Auburn, California: The Audio Partners Publishing Corp., Mystery Masters ISBN 1-57270-498-5 December 10, 2005, audio CD (unabridged, read by Michael Prichard)
- 2011, New York: Bantam Crimeline ISBN 978-0-307-78390-5 February 23, 2011, e-book
- 2016, New York: Bantam Books, The Zeck Trilogy, December 13, 2016, e-book ASIN B01M3TJSPJ
