= In the Best Families =

1950 novel by Rex Stout

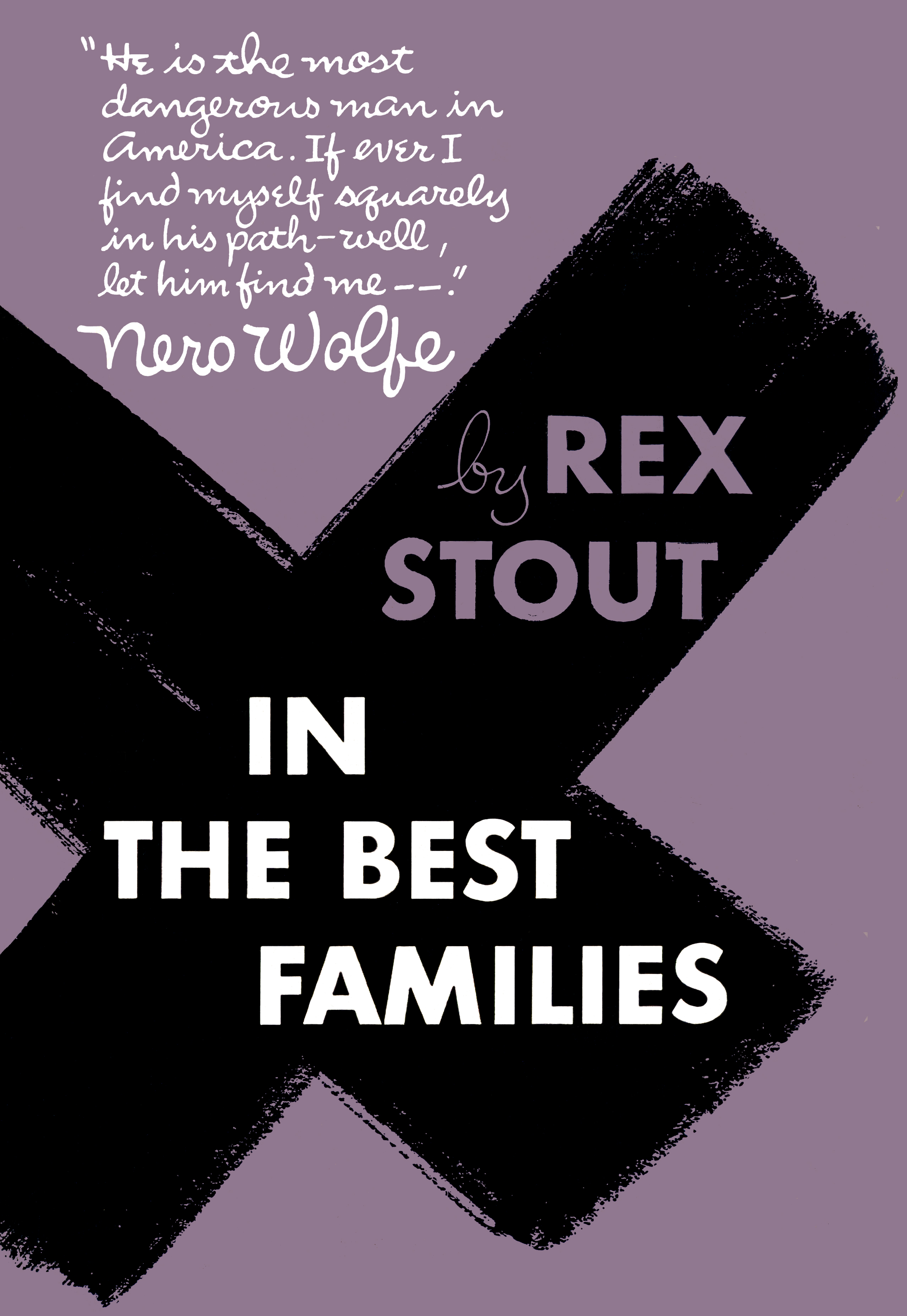
- Author: Rex Stout
- Cover artist: Bill English
- Language: English
- Series: Nero Wolfe
- Genre: Detective fiction
- Publisher: Viking Press
- Publication date: September 29, 1950
- Publication place: United States
- Media type: Print (Hardcover)
- Pages: 246 (first edition)
- OCLC: 1387038
- Preceded by: Three Doors to Death
- Followed by: Curtains for Three

In the Best Families (British title Even in the Best Families) is a Nero Wolfe detective novel by Rex Stout, first published by the Viking Press in 1950. The story was collected in the omnibus volumes Five of a Kind (Viking 1961) and Triple Zeck (Viking 1974).

This is the third of three Nero Wolfe books that involve crime boss Arnold Zeck and his widespread operations; the others are And Be a Villain and The Second Confession. In each book, Zeck – Wolfe's Moriarty – attempts to warn Wolfe off an investigation that Zeck believes will interfere with his criminal machinations. Each time, Wolfe refuses to cooperate, and there are consequences.

== Plot introduction ==
AG:

Do not look for me.

My very best regards and wishes. . . .

NW

— Nero Wolfe's parting instruction, In The Best Families, chapter 6

A wealthy wife hires Nero Wolfe to learn the source of her husband's mysterious income. In short order, Arnold Zeck horns in, the wife is murdered, and Wolfe disappears.

== Plot summary ==
Nero Wolfe is approached by heiress Sarah Rackham and her cousin Calvin Leeds, a breeder of Dobermans, to investigate Sarah's husband Barry, who maintains an unusually lavish lifestyle despite having no income or support from Sarah. After Wolfe reluctantly accepts the job, a tear-gas bomb disguised as a package of sausage is delivered to the brownstone the next day. Wolfe is warned to drop the case by Arnold Zeck, a shadowy criminal mastermind who has matched wits with him twice before. Although it is clear that Barry Rackham is one of Zeck's operatives, Wolfe orders Archie to investigate further.

Soon after Archie arrives at Sarah's estate, he discovers that she and her dog have been murdered. Archie calls Wolfe with the news and returns to the city, suspecting that Barry or someone else in Zeck's enterprise may be responsible. When he arrives, however, he discovers that Nero Wolfe has disappeared during the night, leaving only instructions that Archie should not look for him and a newspaper advertisement announcing Wolfe's retirement from the detective business. The Westchester authorities refuse to believe that Archie does not know where Wolfe is, and he is briefly detained as a material witness. While Archie is in jail, his cell-mate, Max Christy, implies that he is part of Zeck's organisation and offers Archie work.

After being released, Archie is hired by Sarah's daughter-in-law Annabel Frey to investigate her murder, but his attempts soon stall. Over the following months, as Wolfe seems unlikely to return, Archie opens his own detective agency. He is eventually approached by Christy, who renews his offer of employment in Zeck's organisation. Suspecting that Zeck is connected to Sarah's murder, Archie agrees. He is put in contact with Pete Roeder, a high-ranking operative in Zeck's organisation. During a private meeting, however, Roeder reveals he is in fact Wolfe, having lost weight and changed his appearance. After fleeing, Wolfe travelled to the West Coast and established his identity as Roeder to infiltrate Zeck's organisation in order to dismantle it from within, and now needs Archie's help to spring his trap.

Archie persuades Lily Rowan to pose as Roeder's mistress so that the three of them can use her apartment as a covert meeting place. Zeck formally employs Archie to track down Barry, and Archie hires Saul Panzer, Fred Durkin, and Orrie Cather to do so. Barry soon realises what is happening and confronts Archie, but is terrified to learn that Zeck is also interested in his whereabouts; Barry had attempted to leave Zeck's employment, only to be threatened with exposure as a murderer. As Wolfe's trap nears completion, Archie is detained by the Westchester district attorney; Sarah's secretary Lina Darrow has formally claimed that Barry murdered his wife. Realising that Darrow's claims, although based on lies on her part, could get Barry convicted and thus ruin Wolfe's plan, Archie discredits Darrow by revealing that she was Barry's mistress and has been spurned by his refusal to marry her.

Archie takes Barry to meet with Zeck to negotiate an end to his employment. During the meeting, Archie overpowers Zeck, and Wolfe reveals his true identity. Wolfe has gathered enough evidence to destroy Zeck's criminal empire, but is willing to trade it for an end to hostilities and the evidence Zeck has against Barry. Realising that he is doomed either way, Barry shoots Zeck with a concealed gun before being killed by Zeck's bodyguards. With Zeck dead, Wolfe returns to the brownstone intent on exposing Sarah's murderer. He summons the key witnesses to his office and reveals that Leeds, not Barry, killed Sarah. Leeds, who had raised and trained Sarah's dog, was the only person who could have gotten close enough to kill her and it without the dog raising an alarm or attacking. Barry had in fact committed an unrelated murder several years previously that Zeck had used to blackmail him. Afterwards, Archie takes a well-deserved vacation in Norway with Lily, where he receives a letter describing Wolfe's return to his normal routines — and informing him of Leeds' suicide in jail before the start of his trial.

== The unfamiliar word ==
In most Nero Wolfe novels and novellas, there is at least one unfamiliar word, usually spoken by Wolfe. In the Best Families contains the following:

- Trepidant. Just prior to the end of Chapter 2.
- Dissimulation, chapter 13. Wolfe sometimes withholds information from Archie so that he won't have to conceal knowledge by feigning ignorance. In the Best Families is arguably the best case for Wolfe's practice:

"You should act as if ... you knew nothing. Under what circumstances would you do that most convincingly? You are capable of dissimulation, but why try you so severely?"

- Minim. Page 150 (Viking edition). Chapter 13. "A minim of cause for suspicion and I'm through."

== Cast of characters ==
- Nero Wolfe — The private investigator
- Archie Goodwin — Wolfe's assistant, and the narrator of all Wolfe stories
- Sarah Rackham — Wolfe's client
- Calvin Leeds — Sarah's cousin, a breeder of Doberman Pinschers
- Barry Rackham — Sarah's husband
- Lina Darrow — Sarah's personal secretary
- Annabel Frey — Sarah's daughter-in-law
- Oliver Pierce and Dana Hammond — Rackham family friends
- Marko Vukcic — Wolfe's oldest friend
- Arnold Zeck — Chief of an organized crime syndicate
- Pete Roeder — A member of Zeck's syndicate
- Max Christy — A low-level hood working for Zeck
- Cleveland Archer — Westchester District Attorney
- Ben Dykes — Of the Westchester County Detectives
- Lily Rowan — Manhattan socialite and heiress, and Archie's main romantic interest throughout the corpus
- Inspector Cramer — Representing Manhattan Homicide

== Reviews and commentary ==
- Julian Symons, Manchester Evening News (April 5, 1951) — In the fight to the death between master-detective and master-criminal the most ingenious and unlikely subterfuges are used. ... All this is very improbable. It is the art of Mr. Stout to make it seem plausible. ... Holmes was a fully realized character. There is only a handful of his successors to whom that compliment can be paid. One of them, certainly, is Nero Wolfe.
- J. Kenneth Van Dover, At Wolfe's Door — The reader is more affected by the reactions of the detective than by the actions of the criminal — even those of a criminal mastermind. This suggests both the special strength and the special weakness of the Wolfe series. The murder of Mrs. Rackham is poorly motivated, but Wolfe's solution of the case is neat. Archie continues his dalliance with Lily Rowan. And there is a sign of changing times when the Rackham house party turns down the lights and devotes itself to watching three television programs. After 1950, it seems, the inquiring detective cannot depend upon an evening of revealing conversation with the upper class.

== Adaptations ==
=== Nero Wolfe (Paramount Television) ===
In the Best Families was adapted as the seventh episode of Nero Wolfe (1981), an NBC TV series starring William Conrad as Nero Wolfe and Lee Horsley as Archie Goodwin. Other members of the regular cast include George Voskovec (Fritz Brenner), Robert Coote (Theodore Horstmann), George Wyner (Saul Panzer) and Allan Miller (Inspector Cramer). Guest stars include Linden Chiles (Calvin Leeds), Juanin Clay (Annabel Frey), Lawrence Casey (Barry Rackham), Burr DeBenning (Max Christy), Diana Douglas (Sarah Rackham), Robert Loggia (Arnold Dorso [Zeck]) and Alex Rodine (Marko Vukcic). Directed by George McCowan from a teleplay by Alfred Hayes, "In the Best Families" aired March 6, 1981.

=== Nero Wolfe (A&E Network) ===
We were talking about next season, where I might play another character in a smaller part. I'm just dying to get an opportunity to do that!

— Maury Chaykin, star of Nero Wolfe, on plans for the third season of the series

An adaptation of In the Best Families was planned to open the third season of the A&E TV series Nero Wolfe. In a 2002 interview, actor Maury Chaykin said he sometimes referred to Stout's original story to help him play the role of Wolfe:

I'm starting to read In the Best Families. We're talking about doing it as a movie, and having it be the first episode of next season. We're discussing [Wolfe's transformation] and figuring out if and how that can be done. It's an exciting thought to do that one.

Nero Wolfe aired for just two seasons. Chaykin reflected on the show's cancellation in a 2008 interview. "I'm a bit jaded and cynical about which shows succeed on television. I worked on a fantastic show once called Nero Wolfe, but at the time A&E was transforming from the premier intellectual cable network in America to one that airs Dog the Bounty Hunter on repeat, so it was never promoted and eventually went off the air."

== Publication history ==
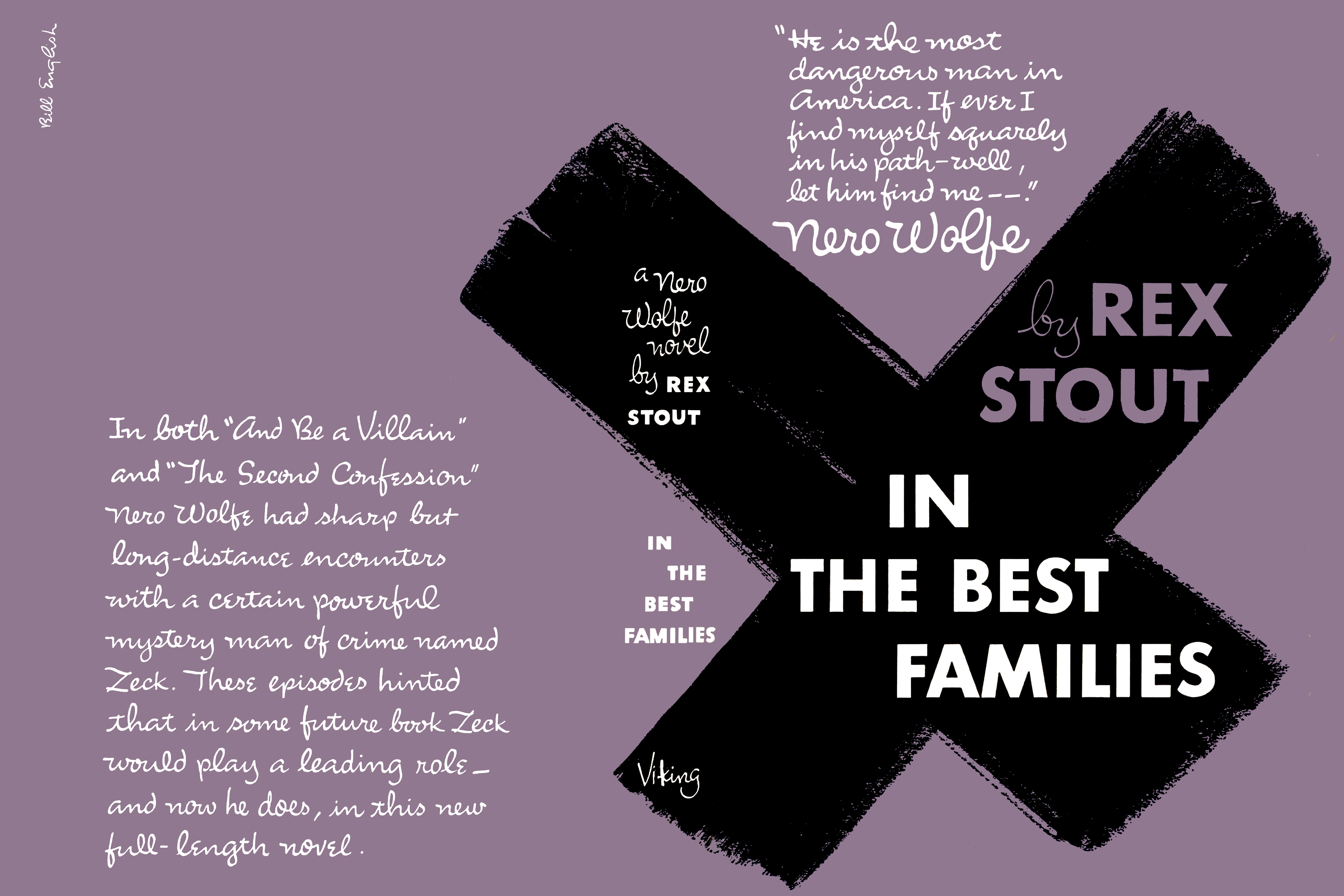
Bill English's design for the first edition of In the Best Families spans the back cover, spine and front cover. Steven Heller describes his designs for Rex Stout's books as "concept-driven jackets [that] echo modernist techniques of the time: photomontage, limited color and sans-serif type. They are also noteworthy for filling both the front and back of the jacket area".

- 1950, New York: The Viking Press, September 2, 1950, hardcover

In his limited-edition pamphlet, Collecting Mystery Fiction #9, Rex Stout's Nero Wolfe Part I, Otto Penzler describes the first edition of In the Best Families: "Yellow cloth, front cover and spine printed with purple; rear cover blank. Issued in a purple, black and white dust wrapper."
In April 2006, Firsts: The Book Collector's Magazine estimated that the first edition of In the Best Families had a value of between $300 and $500. The estimate is for a copy in very good to fine condition in a like dustjacket.

- 1950, abridged in The Montreal Gazette and The Newark Evening News during 1950
- 1951, New York: Viking (Mystery Guild), January 1951, hardcover

The far less valuable Viking book club edition may be distinguished from the first edition in three ways:

- The dust jacket has "Book Club Edition" printed on the inside front flap, and the price is absent (first editions may be price clipped if they were given as gifts).
- Book club editions are sometimes thinner and always taller (usually a quarter of an inch) than first editions.
- Book club editions are bound in cardboard, and first editions are bound in cloth (or have at least a cloth spine).

- 1951, London: Collins Crime Club, April 1951, hardcover (as Even in the Best Families)
- 1953, New York: Bantam #1173, October 1953, paperback
- 1961, New York: The Viking Press, Five of a Kind: The Third Nero Wolfe Omnibus (with The Rubber Band and Three Doors to Death), July 10, 1961, hardcover
- 1964, London: Panther #1752, October 1964, paperback
- 1974, New York: The Viking Press, Triple Zeck: A Nero Wolfe Omnibus (with And Be a Villain and The Second Confession), April 5, 1974, hardcover
- 1980, London: Collins Crime Club Jubilee Edition, 1980, hardcover
- 1992, London: Scribners ISBN 0-356-20107-4, 1992, hardcover (introduction by Julian Symons)(as Even in the Best Families)
- 1995, New York: Bantam Crime Line ISBN 0-553-27776-6 February 1995, paperback, Rex Stout Library edition with introduction by Patricia Sprinkle
- 2000, Auburn, California: The Audio Partners Publishing Corp., Mystery Masters ISBN 1-57270-146-3 July 2000, audio cassette (unabridged, read by Michael Prichard)
- 2010, New York: Bantam ISBN 978-0-307-75601-5 July 21, 2010, e-book
- 2016, New York: Bantam Books, The Zeck Trilogy, December 13, 2016, e-book ASIN B01M3TJSPJ
