= Counterfeit for Murder =

- Short story by Rex Stout
- Original title: The Counterfeiter's Knife
- Country: United States
- Language: English
- Genre: Detective fiction

Publication
- Published in: The Saturday Evening Post
- Publication type: Periodical
- Publication date: January 1961
- Series: Nero Wolfe

"Counterfeit for Murder" is a Nero Wolfe mystery novella by Rex Stout, first serialized as "The Counterfeiter's Knife" in three issues of The Saturday Evening Post (January 14, 21 and 28, 1961). It first appeared in book form in the short-story collection Homicide Trinity, published by the Viking Press in 1962.

An early draft of "Counterfeit for Murder" was posthumously published in the short-story collection Death Times Three (1985) under the title "Assault on a Brownstone".

== Plot summary ==
Illustrated by Austin Briggs, "The Counterfeiter's Knife" was serialized in three issues of The Saturday Evening Post (January 14–28, 1961)

Over the years I have been suspected of a lot of things by various authorities, from corrupting a cop by buying him a drink to complicity in a murder, and that day they added a new one to the list. None of them came right out with it, but what was really biting them was their suspicion that I was in collusion with the United States government.

— Archie Goodwin, contemplating a turf battle between the police and the Treasury Department, in "Counterfeit for Murder," chapter 8

Hattie Annis doesn't like cops. So when she shows up at Wolfe's door with a brown paper package holding a large stack of $20 bills, she thinks that there could be a reward for returning it to its owner, but she won't trust the cops with it. Wolfe is busy with the orchids, but Hattie says she'll come back later if Archie will hold the money for her. Sometime later, a young woman named Tammy Baxter shows up. She is one of the tenants of Hattie's cheap boarding house, and she is concerned for Hattie, who hasn't come home. Archie lies and says he hasn't seen her, and Tammy leaves.

When Hattie returns, she collapses at the doorstep; on her way back to Wolfe's house, a car swerved onto the sidewalk and hit her – fortunately, not hard enough to break bones, but enough to shake her up. In the front room, Hattie is revived by Fritz's coffee, and tells Wolfe and Archie about the money: she found it hidden behind a bookshelf in her boarding house, and opening it, found $10,000 in counterfeit twenties. This revelation is interrupted by Treasury agent Albert Leach ringing the doorbell, wanting to know if Archie has spoken to Hattie or Tammy. Archie, not caring for Leach's approach, admits to meeting Tammy, but he does not mention that Hattie is present in the house.

Wolfe won't take Hattie on as a client, but he allows Archie to accompany her to her boarding house and investigate. Once there, Archie meets Hattie's boarders: Raymond Dell, Noel Ferris and Paul Hannah, three actors, and Martha Kirk, a dancer. It isn't until Archie and Hattie enter the parlor that Archie sees the fifth boarder, Tammy Baxter, lying dead on the floor with a kitchen knife in her chest.

When Homicide arrives, Hattie locks herself in her bedroom and refuses to communicate with the police. Cramer doesn't want to break Hattie's door down and asks Archie to reason with her. Archie does so, and, acting as Wolfe's agent, takes Hattie as a client, but he cannot talk her into coming out from her room. Eventually, Cramer gives up, breaks down her door, and has her carried away to be interrogated.

On his way back to the brownstone, Archie phones Wolfe to inform him that he has been hired. Archie has also concluded that Tammy was a Treasury agent: when Leach asked about her, he indicated that he knew both her phone number and that she had been to the brownstone earlier that day. He and Wolfe conjecture that she had been placed in Hattie's boardinghouse by the Treasury Department to investigate a counterfeiting operation.

The surviving tenants, Dell, Ferris, Hannah, and Kirk, call at the brownstone, where Wolfe questions each of them about personal background, present employment, and source of income. Wolfe gets some hints, and the next day sends Saul Panzer, Fred Durkin and Orrie Cather to reconnoiter at the boarders' places of employment. Archie is called to the DA's office to help sort out why the Treasury Department, and not Manhattan Homicide, has possession of the counterfeit money, which is evidence in a murder case. When Archie returns to the brownstone, it is to find all concerned – the boarders, Inspector Cramer and Sgt. Stebbins, Agent Leach, and Saul Panzer – in the office to hear Saul describe the counterfeiting equipment that he found in the building where Wolfe sent him.

Wolfe then accuses Hannah of running the counterfeiting operation and killing Tammy because she could identify him as the one driving the car that struck Hattie. Hannah had claimed that shortly after her visit to Wolfe, Tammy told him a man had followed her into the boarding house, but he was obviously lying as, being a Treasury agent, she wouldn't have told any of the boarders if something like that happened. Hannah is also the only boarder whose whereabouts are unaccounted for at the time Hattie was struck, as well as the only one who has always paid his rent on time despite no clear source of income. He ran Hattie down because he thought she had a package of the counterfeit money, and when he discovered Tammy had seen him, he stabbed her in the kitchen before dragging her into the parlor.

Hannah ultimately makes a full confession under interrogation, while Wolfe quibbles with Hattie when she insists on paying him more than what he billed her.

== Cast of characters ==
- Nero Wolfe — The private investigator
- Archie Goodwin — Wolfe's assistant (and the narrator of all Wolfe stories)
- Hattie Annis — Owner of a boarding house for actors
- Tammy Baxter — Treasury Department agent posing as an aspiring actress. Murder victim
- Raymond Dell, Noel Ferris, Paul Hannah and Martha Kirk — Boarders at Miss Annis's establishment
- Albert Leach — Another Treasury Department agent
- Inspector Cramer and Sgt. Purley Stebbins — Representing Manhattan Homicide
- Saul Panzer, Fred Durkin, and Orrie Cather — Wolfe's preferred free-lance detectives

== The unfamiliar word ==
In most Nero Wolfe novels and novellas, there is at least one unfamiliar word, usually spoken by Wolfe.

- ". . . of Ormus and of Ind." Chapter 2, spoken by Raymond Dell, quoting from Paradise Lost.

== "Assault on a Brownstone" ==
The original version of "Counterfeit for Murder" was written January 22–February 11, 1959. Although nothing in Rex Stout's personal writing record indicates that he was unhappy with it, Stout discarded all but the first seven pages and rewrote the story March 6–31, 1959. The revised version was serialized in The Saturday Evening Post in January 1961, and published in Homicide Trinity (1962).

In 1972, Stout's authorized biographer John McAleer learned that there was an earlier version of "Counterfeit for Murder" — something even Stout's family didn't know — when Stout shared a copy of his personal writing record with him. Stout believed the unpublished original text had been destroyed, but after his death McAleer found the manuscript after a meticulous search through the author's papers, donated to Boston College in 1980.

Given the title "Assault on a Brownstone", the original version of "Counterfeit for Murder" was published in Death Times Three (1985), edited by John McAleer. In this early draft, Hattie Annis, who would become one of the most carefully drawn and favorite non-recurring Nero Wolfe characters in the revised published version, is the murder victim, while Tammy survives and has an implied romantic relationship with Archie.

McAleer reported that this rewrite was a unique circumstance, since Stout professed that he never revised stories. Stout did, in fact, rewrite at least two other stories: a comparison of the magazine and book versions shows that he rewrote both the beginning and the epilogue of "Before I Die" (1947); and he expanded the novella "Murder Is No Joke" (1958) into the magazine version of the story, "Frame-Up for Murder."

== Publication history ==
=== "Counterfeit for Murder" ===
- 1961, The Saturday Evening Post, January 14 + January 21 + January 28, 1961 (as "The Counterfeiter's Knife")
- 1971, Ellery Queen's Mystery Magazine, August 1971
- 1977, Ellery Queen's Anthology, Spring–Summer 1977

=== Homicide Trinity ===
- 1962, New York: The Viking Press, April 26, 1962, hardcover

Contents include "Eeny Meeny Murder Mo", "Death of a Demon" and "Counterfeit for Murder".
In his limited-edition pamphlet, Collecting Mystery Fiction #10, Rex Stout's Nero Wolfe Part II, Otto Penzler describes the first edition of Homicide Trinity: "Blue cloth, front cover stamped in blind; spine printed with deep pink; rear cover blank. Issued in a mainly blue dust wrapper."
In April 2006, Firsts: The Book Collector's Magazine estimated that the first edition of Homicide Trinity had a value of between $150 and $350. The estimate is for a copy in very good to fine condition in a like dustjacket.

- 1962, Toronto: Macmillan, 1962, hardcover
- 1962, New York: Viking (Mystery Guild), August 1962, hardcover

The far less valuable Viking book club edition may be distinguished from the first edition in three ways:

- The dust jacket has "Book Club Edition" printed on the inside front flap, and the price is absent (first editions may be price clipped if they were given as gifts).
- Book club editions are sometimes thinner and always taller (usually a quarter of an inch) than first editions.
- Book club editions are bound in cardboard, and first editions are bound in cloth (or have at least a cloth spine).

- 1963, London: Collins Crime Club, February 18, 1963, hardcover
- 1966, New York: Bantam #F-3118, February 1966, paperback
- 1993, New York: Bantam Crime Line ISBN 0-553-23446-3 August 1993, paperback, Rex Stout Library edition with introduction by Stephen Greenleaf
- 1997, Newport Beach, California: Books on Tape, Inc. ISBN 0-7366-4062-2 October 31, 1997, audio cassette (unabridged, read by Michael Prichard)
- 2010, New York: Bantam Crimeline ISBN 978-0-307-75599-5 July 7, 2010, e-book

== Adaptations ==
=== Nero Wolfe (CBC Radio) ===
"Counterfeit for Murder" was adapted as the third episode of the Canadian Broadcasting Corporation's 13-part radio series Nero Wolfe (1982), starring Mavor Moore as Nero Wolfe, Don Francks as Archie Goodwin, and Cec Linder as Inspector Cramer. Written and directed by Toronto actor and producer Ron Hartmann, the hour-long adaptation aired on CBC Stereo January 30, 1982.

=== La casa degli attori (Radiotelevisione Italiana) ===
"Counterfeit for Murder" was adapted for a series of Nero Wolfe films produced by the Italian television network RAI (Radiotelevisione Italiana). Written and directed by Giuliana Berlinguer, Nero Wolfe: La casa degli attori first aired January 3, 1970.

The series of black-and-white telemovies stars Tino Buazzelli (Nero Wolfe), Paolo Ferrari (Archie Goodwin), Pupo De Luca (Fritz Brenner), Renzo Palmer (Inspector Cramer), Roberto Pistone (Saul Panzer), Mario Righetti (Orrie Cather) and Gianfranco Varetto (Fred Durkin). Other members of the cast of La casa degli attori include Giusi Raspani Dandolo (Hattie Annis), Agla Marsili (Tammy Baxter), Ruggero De Daninos (Albert Leach), Giorgio Piazza (Raymond Dell), Daniela Surina (Martha Kirk), Paolo Graziosi (Noel Ferris), Giovanni Di Benedetto (Avvocato Parker) and Enrico D'Amato (Procuratore Skinner).
