= And Four to Go =

1958 book by Rex Stout

- Author: Rex Stout
- Cover artist: Bill English
- Language: English
- Series: Nero Wolfe
- Genre: Detective fiction
- Publisher: Viking Press
- Publication date: February 14, 1958
- Publication place: United States
- Media type: Print (hardcover)
- Pages: 190 pp (first edition)
- OCLC: 1460154
- Preceded by: If Death Ever Slept
- Followed by: Champagne for One

And Four to Go (British title Crime and Again) is a collection of Nero Wolfe mystery novellas by Rex Stout, published by the Viking Press in 1958. The book comprises four stories — three appearing previously in periodicals, and one making its debut in print:

- "Christmas Party" (Collier's, January 4, 1957, as "The Christmas-Party Murder")
- "Easter Parade" (Look, April 16, 1957, as "The Easter Parade Murder")
- "Fourth of July Picnic" (Look, July 9, 1957, as "The Labor Union Murder")
- "Murder Is No Joke", later expanded as "Frame-Up for Murder" and serialized in three issues of The Saturday Evening Post (June 21–July 5, 1958)

== Publication history ==
- 1958, New York: The Viking Press, April 29, 1958, hardcover.

In his limited-edition pamphlet, Collecting Mystery Fiction #10, Rex Stout's Nero Wolfe Part II, Otto Penzler describes the first edition of And Four to Go: "Blue cloth, front cover and spine printed with red; rear cover blank. Issued in a mainly brick red dust wrapper."
In April 2006, Firsts: The Book Collector's Magazine estimated that the first edition of And Four to Go had a value of between $200 and $350. The estimate is for a copy in very good to fine condition in a like dustjacket.

- 1958, New York: Viking (Mystery Guild), August 1958, hardcover. In the printing of "Easter Parade," a page presenting black-and-white versions of the four Look magazine photographs is placed between pages 96 and 97.

The far less valuable Viking book club edition may be distinguished from the first edition in three ways:

- The dust jacket has "Book Club Edition" printed on the inside front flap, and the price is absent (first editions may be price clipped if they were given as gifts).
- Book club editions are sometimes thinner and always taller (usually a quarter of an inch) than first editions.
- Book club editions are bound in cardboard, and first editions are bound in cloth (or have at least a cloth spine).

- 1959, London: Collins Crime Club, May 25, 1959, hardcover (as Crime and Again)
- 1959, New York: Bantam #A-2016, November 1959, paperback, 35¢
- 1962, London: Fontana #629, 1962 (as Crime and Again)
- 1974, New York: Mystery #Q8528, December 1974, paperback, $1.25
- 1992, New York: Bantam Crime Line ISBN 0-553-24985-1 December 1992, paperback, Rex Stout Library edition with introduction by Jane Haddam
- 1997, Newport Beach, California: Books on Tape, Inc. ISBN 0-7366-4059-2 October 31, 1997, audio cassette (unabridged, read by Michael Prichard)
- 2010, New York: Bantam Crimeline ISBN 978-0-307-75569-8 July 21, 2010, e-book
