= Christmas Party (short story) =

- Short story by Rex Stout
- Original title: The Christmas-Party Murder
- Country: United States
- Language: English
- Genre: Detective fiction

Publication
- Published in: Collier's
- Publication type: Periodical
- Publication date: January 4, 1957
- Series: Nero Wolfe

"Christmas Party" is a Nero Wolfe mystery novella by Rex Stout, first published as "The Christmas-Party Murder" in the January 4, 1957, issue of Collier's magazine. It first appeared in book form in the short-story collection And Four to Go, published by the Viking Press in 1958. The story has been adapted for television, radio, and the stage.

== Plot summary ==
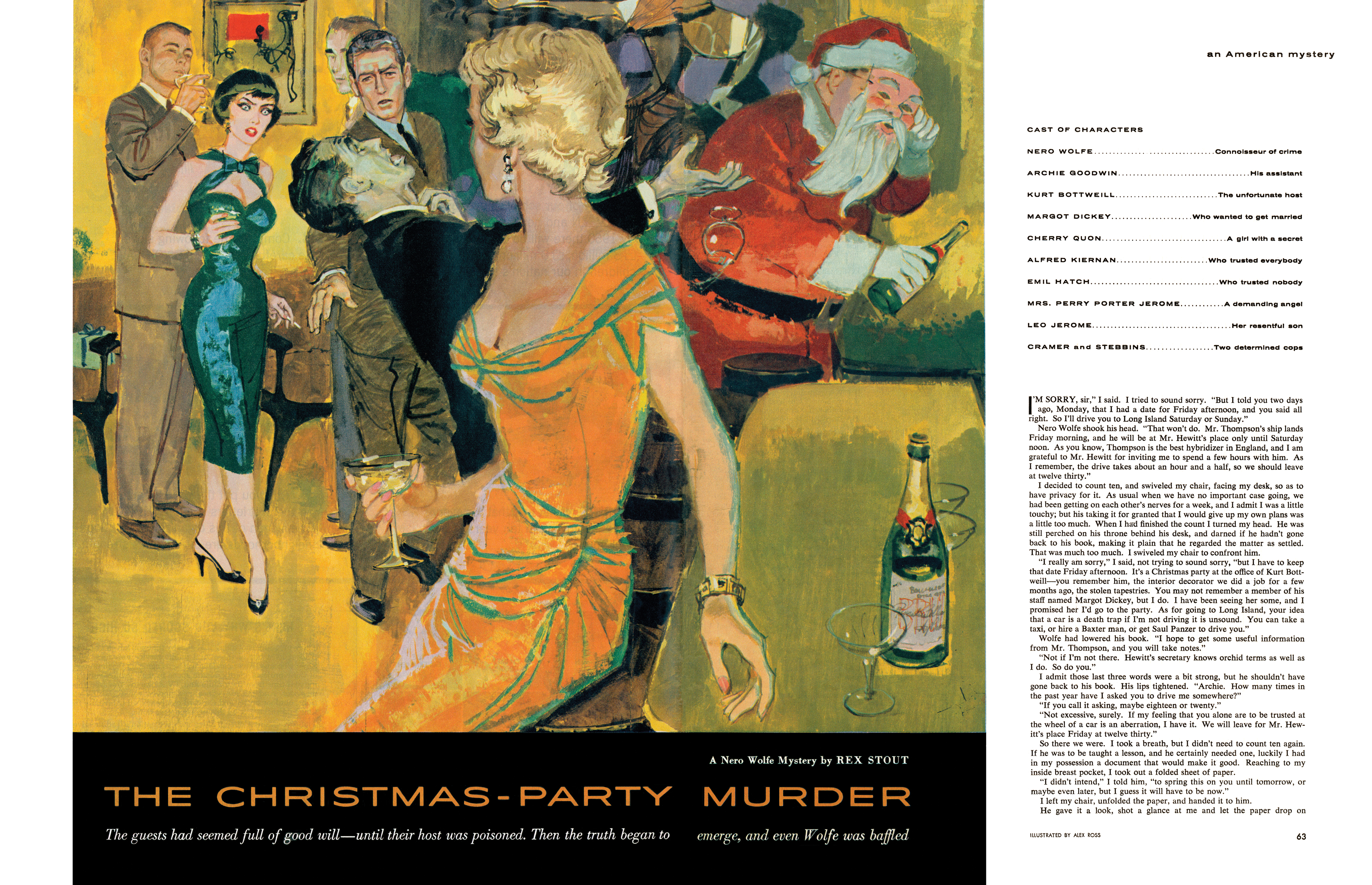
"The Christmas-Party Murder", illustrated by Alex Ross, appeared in the final issue of Collier's magazine (January 4, 1957).

"Confound it," he bellowed, "marry and be damned!"

— Nero Wolfe, congratulating Archie Goodwin on his impending nuptials, in "Christmas Party", chapter 4.

Nero Wolfe occasionally riles Archie when he takes Archie's services too much for granted. On Wednesday he tells Archie to change his personal plans of two weeks standing so that he can drive Wolfe to Long Island for a meeting on Friday with an orchid hybridizer. After counting ten, Archie explains that he cannot and will not chauffeur Wolfe on Friday. He has promised his fiancée that he will attend her office Christmas party, at a furniture design studio. To substantiate his claim, Archie shows Wolfe a marriage license, duly signed and executed: the State is willing for Archie Goodwin and Margot Dickey to wed.

Wolfe is incredulous, but hires a limousine to take him to Long Island as Archie attends the party. There, a conversation between Archie and Margot reveals that Margot has been trying to get her employer and paramour, Kurt Bottweill, to quit procrastinating and marry her. She has suggested to Archie, who is no more to her than a friend and dancing partner, that a marriage license might motivate Bottweill to propose and follow through. Archie gave her the license on Thursday, and now Margot tells him that the plan worked perfectly, that she and Bottweill are to marry.

Also attending the party are Bottweill; his business manager Alfred Kiernan; an artisan named Emil Hatch who turns Bottweill's designs into marketable merchandise; Cherry Quon, an East Asian who is the office receptionist; and Mrs. Perry Jerome and her son – Mrs. Jerome is a wealthy widow who is the source of Bottweill's business capital. The Bottweill-Jerome business relationship is apparently based on intimacy, which her son Leo is bent on disrupting. Santa Claus is also present, tending bar.

Bottweill starts to toast the season but before he can do so Kiernan interrupts. Everyone has champagne, but Bottweill's drink is Pernod – he keeps an entire case of it in his office. Kiernan brings Bottweill a glass of Pernod. Bottweill finishes his toast, tosses back the Pernod, and promptly dies of cyanide poisoning.

As Archie is issuing instructions – call the police, don't touch anything, nobody leave – he notices that Santa has already left. Hatch says no one has left via the elevator, and the only other exit is to Bottweill's office. There's nothing unusual there, and Archie pushes a button that calls Bottweill's private elevator. When it arrives, Archie finds Santa's wig, mask, jacket and breeches on its floor.

The police arrive, led by Sergeant Purley Stebbins, and after several hours of questioning he dismisses the partygoers. Purley's first task is to try to find Santa, and if that approach leads nowhere then he'll start after the others. Archie heads back to the brownstone, where Wolfe, having returned from his errand, is eating dinner. Wolfe has heard on the radio a report of Bottweill's death, and after discussing it briefly, Wolfe sends Archie to his room to bring him a book. Archie finds the book, and also finds, draped over it, a pair of white gloves that appear to be identical to the gloves that Santa was wearing while tending bar.

Stunned at first, Archie works it out that Wolfe was the bartender in a Santa costume. He must have arranged the charade in order to judge for himself whether Archie and Margot were genuinely involved or the marriage license was flummery. For Wolfe to have gone to such an extreme must mean that Wolfe regarded the situation as potentially desperate. Finally, Wolfe left the gloves for Archie to find so that he would reason it all out for himself, thus sparing Wolfe the necessity of admitting how much he depends on Archie.

Archie returns to the office and, skipping the issue of Wolfe's motives, reports on the events that followed Wolfe's escape. Stebbins has established that all the partygoers knew that Bottweill drank Pernod and kept a supply in his office. All knew that a supply of cyanide was kept in the workshop one floor down from the studio: Hatch uses it in his gold-plating work. Any of them could have found an opportunity to get some cyanide from the workshop and, unobserved, put it in Bottweill's current bottle of Pernod. But none of them ran when Bottweill died. Only Santa ran, and the police are concentrating for the moment on finding whoever played Santa. Wolfe gives Archie a brief summary about his meeting with Bottweill that afternoon preparing to become Santa, including Botteill's having a drink, in Wolfe's presence, from the same Pernod bottle that was later poisoned - a fact the police would love to have.

When Archie finishes reporting, the doorbell rings. It's Cherry Quon, without appointment, wanting to speak with Wolfe. It comes out that Cherry recently became engaged to marry Bottweill. She is convinced that Margot murdered Bottweill in a rage at being thrown over for Cherry. And she delivers a bombshell: she knows it was Wolfe who played Santa at the party. Bottweill had told her that morning at breakfast.

Cherry has a demand: she wants one of Wolfe's men to confess to having played Santa. As he was putting on the costume, in the bathroom attached to Bottweill's office, Wolfe's man heard something, peeked out, and saw Margot putting something in the Pernod bottle. Cherry is not blatant about it, but she implies strongly that if Wolfe does not comply with her demand she will tell the police that Wolfe himself was Santa.

That's the last thing Wolfe wants – Cramer would lock him up as a material witness and possibly for withholding evidence, and the publicity would be humiliating. But Wolfe refuses to go along with Cherry's script. Instead, he sends notes to all the partygoers, inviting the murderer to identify himself. The notes appear to be from the man who played Santa, telling each suspect he saw them poisoning the bottle and wants to meet. He will identify himself by saying "Saint Nick". Wolfe sends Saul Panzer to impersonate the blackmailer.

Later, Cramer, Stebbins, Saul, and all the suspects arrive at the brownstone, and Saul recounts to Wolfe the response to the letters; both Margot and Kiernan came to meet the blackmailer, but when Saul said "Saint Nick" to each of them, Kiernan signaled undercover officers while Margot tried to run. Cramer confirms all the suspects except Margot and Cherry reported the letters to the police. As Wolfe did not send a letter to Cherry for she would have known it was from him, this proves Margot murdered Bottweill. The motive is obvious; she told Archie that Bottweill ripped up the fake marriage license and threw it in his office wastebasket, which was after the cleaning lady had already emptied it, but no pieces were found and the wastebasket has not been emptied again since. Margot's plan had actually failed, with Bottweill instead telling her his intention to wed Cherry. Margot tries to accuse Cherry of framing her, but now even Cramer is convinced, and places Margot under arrest.

Cherry remains behind after the others leave, and Wolfe tells her he didn't follow her plan only because he couldn't be sure she herself wasn't the killer, but now he is. He also convinces Cherry not to tell anyone he was Santa to avoid being hassled by the police.

== Cast of characters ==
- Nero Wolfe — The private investigator
- Archie Goodwin — Wolfe's assistant, and the narrator of all Wolfe stories
- Kurt Bottweill — Owner of a studio specializing in modern metallic designs
- Margot Dickey — Bottweill's sales representative
- Alfred Kiernan — Bottweill's business manager
- Emil Hatch — Artisan in Bottweill's employ
- Cherry Quon — Bottweill's receptionist
- Mrs. Perry Porter Jerome — Wealthy widow and apparently intimate source of Bottweill's capital
- Leo Jerome — Her son
- Saul Panzer — A free-lance operative, Wolfe's first choice when he can't or won't spare Archie
- Inspector Cramer and Sergeant Stebbins — Representing Manhattan Homicide

== Adaptations ==
=== Television ===
==== Nero Wolfe (A&E Network) ====
"Wolfe Goes Out" was released on DVD for the first time in 2010

"Christmas Party" was adapted for the first season of the A&E TV series A Nero Wolfe Mystery (2001–2002). Directed by Holly Dale from a teleplay by Sharon Elizabeth Doyle, the episode made its debut July 1, 2001, on A&E.

Timothy Hutton is Archie Goodwin; Maury Chaykin is Nero Wolfe. Other members of the cast (in credits order) include Bill Smitrovich (Inspector Cramer), Colin Fox (Fritz Brenner), Kari Matchett (Lily Rowan), Francie Swift (Margot Dickey), Conrad Dunn (Saul Panzer), M. J. Kang (Cherry Quon), David Schurmann (Alfred Kiernan), Richard Waugh (Emil Hatch), Jodi Racicot (Leo Jerome), Nicky Guadagni (Mrs. Perry Porter Jerome), Robert Bockstael (Kurt Bottweil) and R. D. Reid (Sergeant Purley Stebbins).

In addition to original music by Nero Wolfe composer Michael Small, the soundtrack includes music by Bill Novick and Paul Lenart (opening sequence), Ludwig van Beethoven, Brian Morris and Dick Walter.

In international broadcasts, the episodes "Door to Death" and "Christmas Party" are linked and expanded into a 90-minute widescreen telefilm titled "Wolfe Goes Out." (Note: Program listings for the Sunday, November 7, 2004, broadcast on Sky Movies 2 record the broadcast as widescreen format.)

A Nero Wolfe Mystery began to be released on Region 2 DVD in 2009, marketed in the Netherlands by Just Entertainment. The third collection (EAN 8717344739481), released in April 2010, made the 90-minute features "Wolfe Goes Out" and "Wolfe Stays In" available on home video for the first time. Until then, the linked episodes "Door to Death"/"Christmas Party" and "Eeny Meeny Murder Mo"/"Disguise for Murder" were available only in the abbreviated form sold in North America by A&E Home Video (ISBN 0-7670-8893-X). These DVD releases present the episodes in 4:3 pan and scan rather than their 16:9 aspect ratio for widescreen viewing, and are not offered in high-definition video.

=== Radio ===
==== Nero Wolfe (CBC Radio) ====
"Christmas Party" was adapted as the fifth episode of the Canadian Broadcasting Corporation's 13-part radio series Nero Wolfe (1982), starring Mavor Moore as Nero Wolfe, Don Francks as Archie Goodwin, and Cec Linder as Inspector Cramer. Written and directed by Toronto actor and producer Ron Hartmann, the hour-long adaptation aired on CBC Stereo February 13, 1982.

=== Stage ===
==== Festa di Natale (Italy, 2009) ====
The Teatro del Stabile del Giallo in Rome presented a stage adaptation of "Christmas Party" with a scheduled run of November 14 – December 20, 2009.

== Publication history ==
=== "Christmas Party" ===
- 1957, Collier's, January 4, 1957 (as "The Christmas-Party Murder")

"Christmas Party" appeared in the final issue of Collier's, a venerable magazine founded in 1888. On February 4, 1957, Herbert Block wrote Rex Stout: "One thing about the demise of Collier's — it ended in fine style, with the cover proudly proclaiming a 'Nero Wolfe thriller.' And a thriller it certainly was; but I don't think anyone else could have got the added special thrill that I did when I came to the lines about Here and Now!"

- 1965, Ellery Queen's Mystery Magazine, January 1965 (as "The Christmas Party Murder")
- 1971, Ellery Queen's Anthology, 1971 (as "The Christmas Party Murder")
- 1999, Canada, Durkin Hayes Publishing, DH Audio ISBN 1-55204-627-3 December 1999, audio cassette (read by Saul Rubinek)

=== And Four to Go ===
- 1958, New York: The Viking Press, April 29, 1958, hardcover.

Contents include "Christmas Party", "Easter Parade", "Fourth of July Picnic" and "Murder Is No Joke"
In his limited-edition pamphlet, Collecting Mystery Fiction #10, Rex Stout's Nero Wolfe Part II, Otto Penzler describes the first edition of And Four to Go: "Blue cloth, front cover and spine printed with red; rear cover blank. Issued in a mainly brick red dust wrapper."
In April 2006, Firsts: The Book Collector's Magazine estimated that the first edition of And Four to Go had a value of between $200 and $350. The estimate is for a copy in very good to fine condition in a like dustjacket.

- 1958, New York: Viking (Mystery Guild), August 1958, hardcover. In the printing of "Easter Parade," a page presenting black-and-white versions of the four Look magazine photographs is placed between pages 96 and 97.

The far less valuable Viking book club edition may be distinguished from the first edition in three ways:

- The dust jacket has "Book Club Edition" printed on the inside front flap, and the price is absent (first editions may be price clipped if they were given as gifts).
- Book club editions are sometimes thinner and always taller (usually a quarter of an inch) than first editions.
- Book club editions are bound in cardboard, and first editions are bound in cloth (or have at least a cloth spine).

- 1959, London: Collins Crime Club, May 25, 1959, hardcover (as Crime and Again)
- 1959, New York: Bantam #A-2016, November 1959, paperback
- 1962, London: Fontana #629, 1962 (as Crime and Again)
- 1992, New York: Bantam Crime Line ISBN 0-553-24985-1 December 1992, paperback, Rex Stout Library edition with introduction by Jane Haddam
- 1997, Newport Beach, California: Books on Tape, Inc. ISBN 0-7366-4059-2 October 31, 1997, audio cassette (unabridged, read by Michael Prichard)
- 2010, New York: Bantam Crimeline ISBN 978-0-307-75569-8 July 21, 2010, e-book
