= Fourth of July Picnic =

- Short story by Rex Stout
- Original title: The Labor Union Murder
- Country: United States
- Language: English
- Genre: Detective fiction

Publication
- Published in: Look
- Publication type: Periodical
- Publication date: July 9, 1957
- Series: Nero Wolfe

"Fourth of July Picnic" is a Nero Wolfe mystery novella by Rex Stout, first published as "The Labor Union Murder" in the July 9, 1957, issue of Look magazine. It first appeared in book form in the short-story collection And Four to Go, published by the Viking Press in 1958.

== Plot summary ==
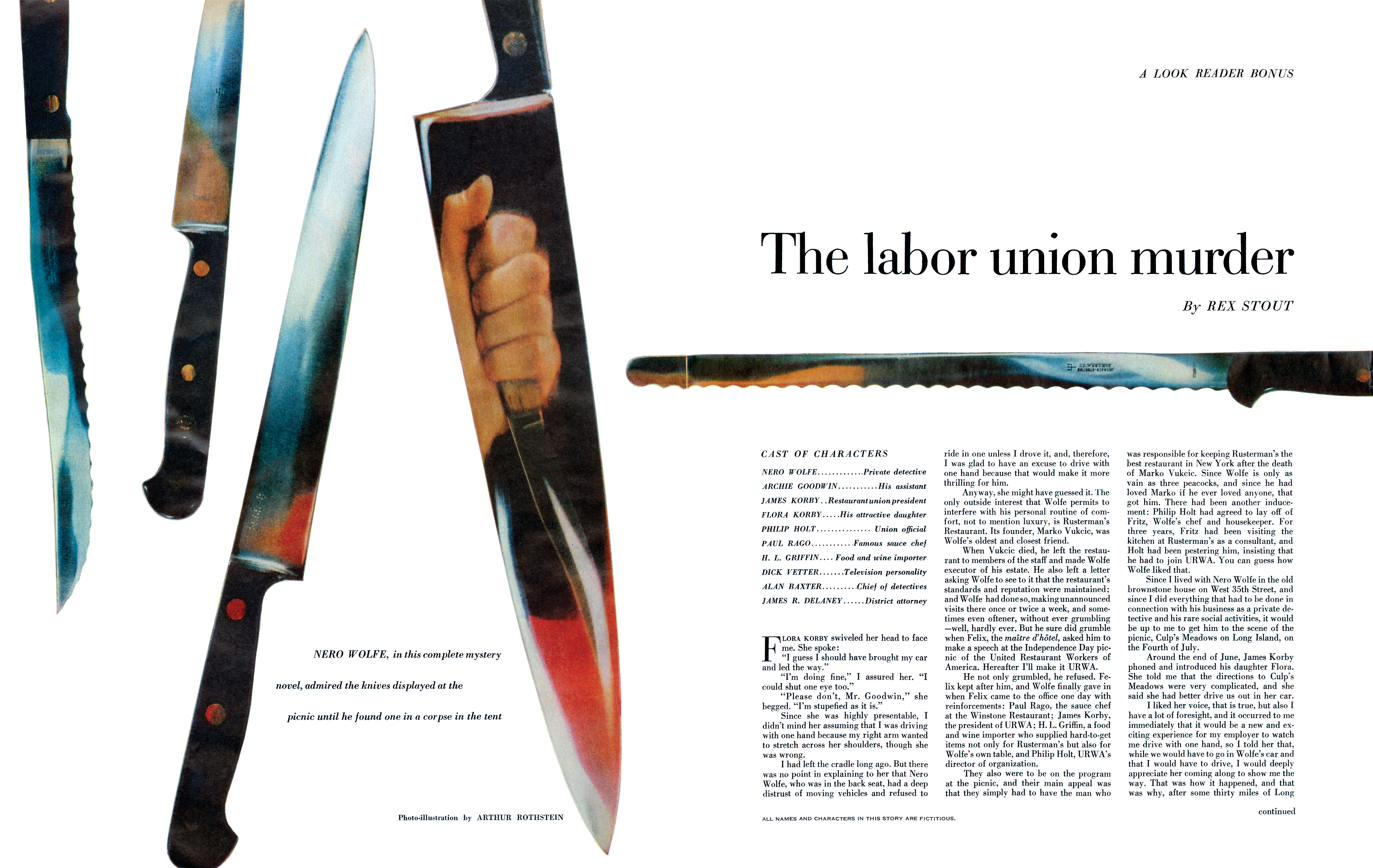
"The Labor Union Murder" appeared in Look magazine (July 9, 1957) with photo-illustrations by Arthur Rothstein

A restaurant workers' union is having a Fourth of July picnic in a remote meadow on Long Island. Time has been set aside during the afternoon for a few speeches from prominent figures in the restaurant business, and also one from Nero Wolfe. Wolfe has been the trustee for Rusterman's Restaurant since the death of his old friend Marko Vukcic, and because the restaurant is so highly regarded the union wants Wolfe to speak. As an added inducement, the union has also promised to stop trying to get Fritz, Wolfe's personal chef, to join.

Wolfe and Archie arrive at the meadow and work their way through a tent to a raised platform from which the speakers will address the thousands of union members. One of the organizers, Phil Holt, has eaten some bad snails and is lying in misery on a cot in the tent. He has been seen by a doctor but is too weak to participate in the festivities. He is shivering and Wolfe tells Archie to tie the tent flap closed, to help stop the draft blowing through.

One by one, as the scheduled speakers address the throng, those on the speakers' platform (union president James Korby, TV emcee Dick Vetter, sauce chef Paul Rago, and importer H.L. Griffin) go back into the tent to see to Holt. Eventually Wolfe goes to check on Holt and shortly calls to Archie to join him. Holt is dead, lying on the cot, covered by a blanket that conceals the knife in his back.

It is Wolfe's habit, when he is away from home and confronted by a murder, to tell Archie to take him back to the brownstone immediately, before the police arrive. It is Archie's habit to refuse and he does so now, pointing out that they would simply be hauled back to Long Island. Wolfe concedes the point and returns to the platform to deliver his speech.

Archie has noticed that the tent flap is no longer tied shut. He glances out the back of the tent and sees a woman sitting in a car parked by the tent. Archie gets her name, Anna Banau, and asks her if she has seen anyone enter the tent since the speeches started. Mrs. Banau says that she has not. Archie is impressed by her calm certainty, and concludes that no one entered the tent from the back. Someone must have gone in from the platform, stabbed Holt, and then opened the rear flap to make it appear as though the killer came from that direction, not from the platform.

The body is soon discovered and the police are called. It's clear that the local District Attorney would love to hold Wolfe and Archie as material witnesses, but he can't find a legitimate reason, so Wolfe returns home after all. The next day, though, Mr. Banau comes calling. He knows of his wife's discussion with Archie on the prior afternoon, and cannot understand why the papers report that the police are proceeding on the assumption that the murderer entered the tent from the rear. His wife saw no one enter the tent from that side, and that is what she told Archie – surely Archie passed that along to the police. When Wolfe tells Banau that Mrs. Banau's information was not passed along, Banau becomes upset and leaves the brownstone, stating that he must tell the police.

Wolfe sees that he and Archie will be arrested and must make their getaway. They head for Saul Panzer's apartment, where they have arranged to meet with the others who were on the speakers' platform. Wolfe as yet has no idea who the murderer is, nor the motive for the crime. But when the principal suspects arrive at Saul's, Wolfe finds it important that he and Archie share autobiographical sketches with them. Then he bluffs the murderer into identifying himself by claiming the murderer's fingerprints were found on the tape holding the flap closed. Rago immediately admits the prints are his, but claimed all he did was open the tent flap to help Holt breathe more easily. However, Wolfe knows Rago would have mentioned that earlier if that were really the case, and Rago is actually the murderer trying to lie his way out. Holt had been having an affair with Rago's wife, and Rago killed Holt in a jealous rage upon discovering this.

== Cast of characters ==
- Nero Wolfe – The private investigator
- Archie Goodwin – Wolfe's assistant, and the narrator of all Wolfe stories
- Phil Holt – Union organizer and murder victim
- James Korby – Union president; speaker
- Flora Korby – His daughter
- Paul Rago – Sauce chef at the Churchill; speaker
- H. L. Griffin – Food and wine importer; speaker
- Dick Vetter – Television emcee; speaker
- Alexander Banau – Captain at Zoller's Restaurant
- Anna Banau – His wife
- James R. Delaney – District Attorney on Long Island
- Saul Panzer – A free-lance operative, Wolfe's first choice when he cannot or will not spare Archie

== Publication history ==
=== "Fourth of July Picnic" ===
- 1957, Look, July 9, 1957 (as "The Labor Union Murder")
- 1965, Ellery Queen's Mystery Magazine, August 1965 (as "The Fourth of July Murder")
- 1979, Ellery Queen's Wings of Mystery, ed. by Ellery Queen, New York: Davis Publications, 1979

=== And Four to Go ===
- 1958, New York: The Viking Press, April 29, 1958, hardcover.

Contents include "Christmas Party", "Easter Parade", "Fourth of July Picnic" and "Murder Is No Joke"
In his limited-edition pamphlet, Collecting Mystery Fiction #10, Rex Stout's Nero Wolfe Part II, Otto Penzler describes the first edition of And Four to Go: "Blue cloth, front cover and spine printed with red; rear cover blank. Issued in a mainly brick red dust wrapper."
In April 2006, Firsts: The Book Collector's Magazine estimated that the first edition of And Four to Go had a value of between $200 and $350. The estimate is for a copy in very good to fine condition in a like dustjacket.

- 1958, New York: Viking (Mystery Guild), August 1958, hardcover. In the printing of "Easter Parade," a page presenting black-and-white versions of the four Look magazine photographs is placed between pages 96 and 97.

The far less valuable Viking book club edition may be distinguished from the first edition in three ways:

- The dust jacket has "Book Club Edition" printed on the inside front flap, and the price is absent (first editions may be price clipped if they were given as gifts).
- Book club editions are sometimes thinner and always taller (usually a quarter of an inch) than first editions.
- Book club editions are bound in cardboard, and first editions are bound in cloth (or have at least a cloth spine).

- 1959, London: Collins Crime Club, May 25, 1959, hardcover (as Crime and Again)
- 1959, New York: Bantam #A-2016, November 1959, paperback
- 1962, London: Fontana #629, 1962 (as Crime and Again)
- 1992, New York: Bantam Crime Line ISBN 0-553-24985-1 December 1992, paperback, Rex Stout Library edition with introduction by Jane Haddam
- 1997, Newport Beach, California: Books on Tape, Inc. ISBN 0-7366-4059-2 October 31, 1997, audio cassette (unabridged, read by Michael Prichard)
- 2010, New York: Bantam Crimeline ISBN 978-0-307-75569-8 July 21, 2010, e-book
