= Easter Parade (short story) =

1957 Easter Parade short story

- Short story by Rex Stout
- Illustrations by Austin Briggs; Photographs by Tony Vaccaro
- Original title: The Easter Parade Murder
- Country: United States
- Language: English
- Genre: Detective fiction

Publication
- Published in: Look
- Publication type: Periodical
- Publication date: April 16, 1957
- Series: Nero Wolfe

"Easter Parade" is a Nero Wolfe mystery novella by Rex Stout, first published as "The Easter Parade Murder" in the April 16, 1957, issue of Look magazine. It first appeared in book form in the short-story collection And Four to Go, published by the Viking Press in 1958.

== Plot summary ==
When Nero Wolfe's envy is aroused he'll go to any length to satisfy it. He embarrassed Archie in his pursuit of Jerome Berin's recipe for saucisse minuit, and he strongarmed Lewis Hewitt to get those black orchids. Now he's learned that Millard Bynoe has hybridized a pink Vanda orchid, a unique plant. He wants to examine one and Bynoe has turned him down.

Wolfe has also learned that Mrs. Bynoe will sport a spray of the pink Vanda at this year's Easter parade in New York, and wonders if Archie knows anyone who would steal it from her. Archie does have a suggestion, a shifty character nicknamed Tabby, who would probably commit petty larceny in public for a couple of hundred bucks. Archie suggests that in addition to arranging for Tabby's services, it might be wise to get a photograph of the orchids. Archie offers to attend the parade too, with Wolfe's new camera.

So it's decided: Tabby will position himself outside the church where Mr. and Mrs. Bynoe will attend Easter services and will try to snatch the orchid corsage from her shoulder as they exit the church. Archie will be across the street with the camera, attempting to get a good photo of the corsage in case Tabby's attempted theft fails.

Easter morning arrives. Both Tabby and Archie are in place – Archie's sharing some wooden crates with several other photographers so as to see over the crowd. One of them is a comely young woman named Iris Innes, who is there as a staff photographer for a magazine.

The Bynoes exit the church in the company of another man, later identified as Henry Frimm, the executive secretary of the couple's rehabilitation fund. Tabby tries to grab the orchids but Frimm wards him off. So Tabby ducks away into the crowd and begins to stalk them as the three walk up the avenue. Archie has been able to capture much of the action on film.

Suddenly, Mrs. Bynoe collapses. As her companions try to help her, Tabby dashes up to them, snatches the orchid corsage, and sprints away. Archie takes off after him, and catches up just as Tabby gets into a cab. Archie joins him, hushes him, and tells the cabbie to take them to 918 West 35th.

Only after Wolfe has had time to examine the orchids, and to announce that he would pay $3,000 (in 1958) for the full plant, does Archie get a chance to point out that if necessary the police will identify and track Tabby down, and that inevitably Tabby will give up Wolfe and Archie. Archie phones Lon Cohen and learns that Mrs. Bynoe is dead. Wolfe wants to avoid any public mention of his association with the incident, and offers Tabby $10 a day to remain incommunicado at the brownstone. After trying unsuccessfully to raise the per diem, Tabby accepts.

Archie prudently removes the film from the camera, and his foresight soon pays off when Inspector Cramer arrives. A needle containing strychnine has been found in Mrs. Bynoe's abdomen, and the theory is that the needle was shot from a spring-loaded mechanism such as a camera. Cramer appropriates the camera, but doesn't ask whether the film is still in it. Monday morning, Archie takes the film to a camera store to be developed.

Then he spends much of the day trying futilely to reach the other photographers, including Miss Innes. Archie spends the remaining hours at the District Attorney's office, answering questions and refusing to answer questions that he contends are immaterial to the investigation of Mrs. Bynoe's murder. He is dismissed in time to get the developed pictures from the store and return to the brownstone before dark.

There he finds Mr. Bynoe, Inspector Cramer, DA Skinner and several others, including the photographers Archie's been looking for. Wolfe asks to see the photos. He arranges a re-enactment of the scene in front of the church, and shows Cramer how the photos that Archie took demonstrate the murderer's identity.

The poisoned needle wasn't shot from a camera at all, but simply injected manually, and one of the photos shows Frimm holding it, which is given away by the position of his hand. Shocked and furious, Bynoe reveals Frimm was the one who originally suggested the camera theory. Mrs. Bynoe had discovered Frimm was embezzling from the rehabilitation fund and planned to tell her husband, but unfortunately for her, decided to wait until after Easter, allowing Frimm time to eliminate her.

Frimm is convicted of murdering Mrs. Bynoe, while Mr. Bynoe gratefully shows Wolfe his orchid collection. Tabby's fate, however, is left unclear.

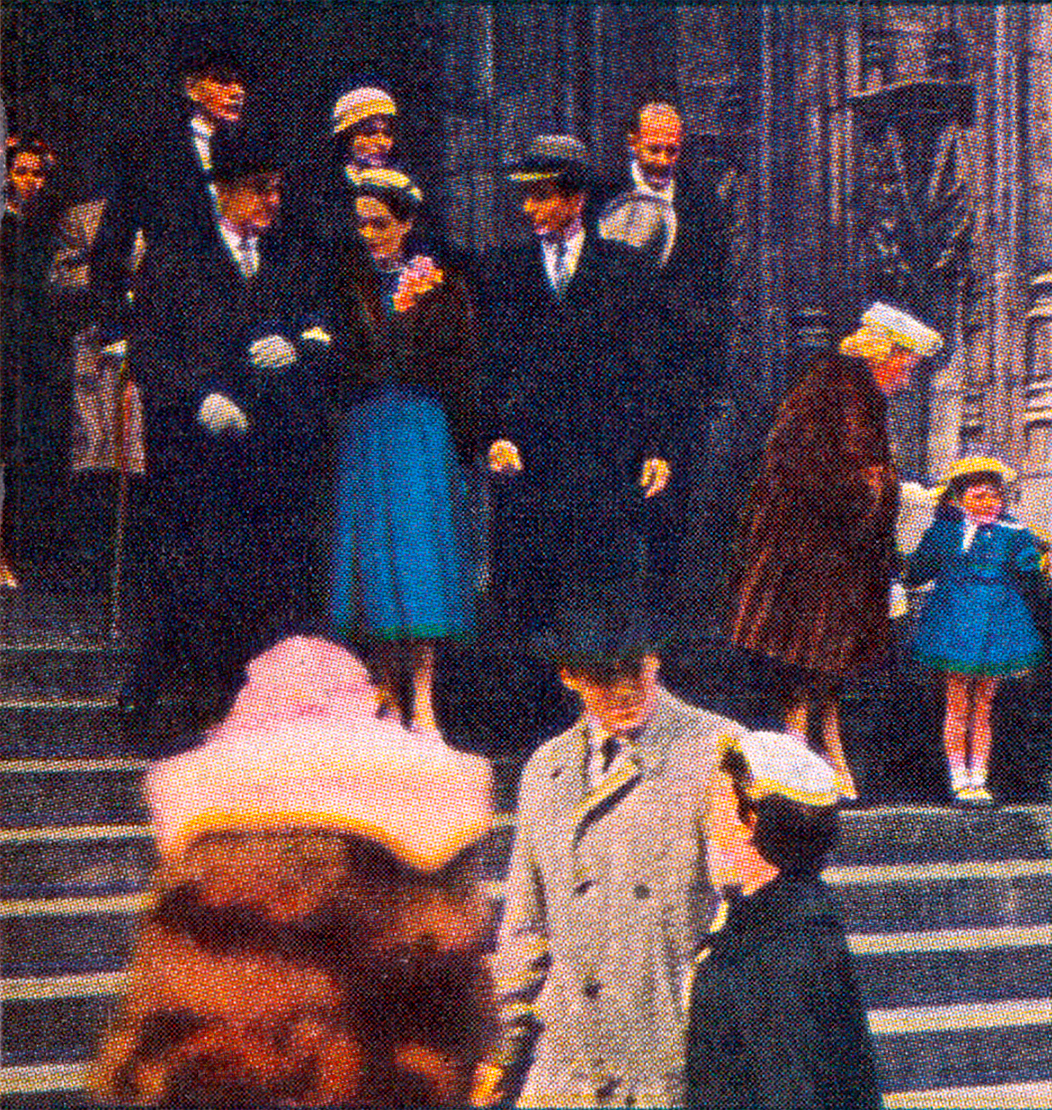

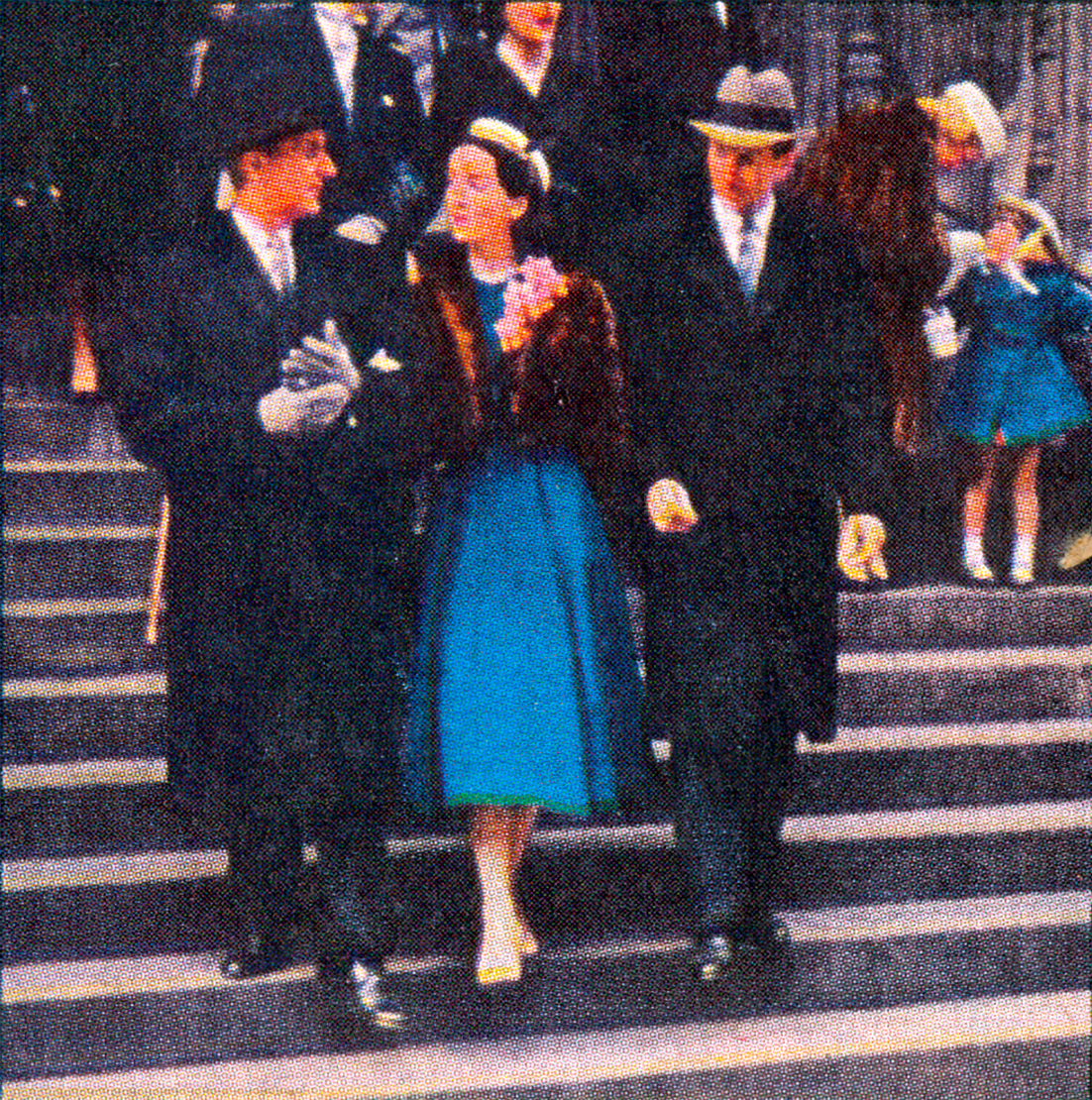

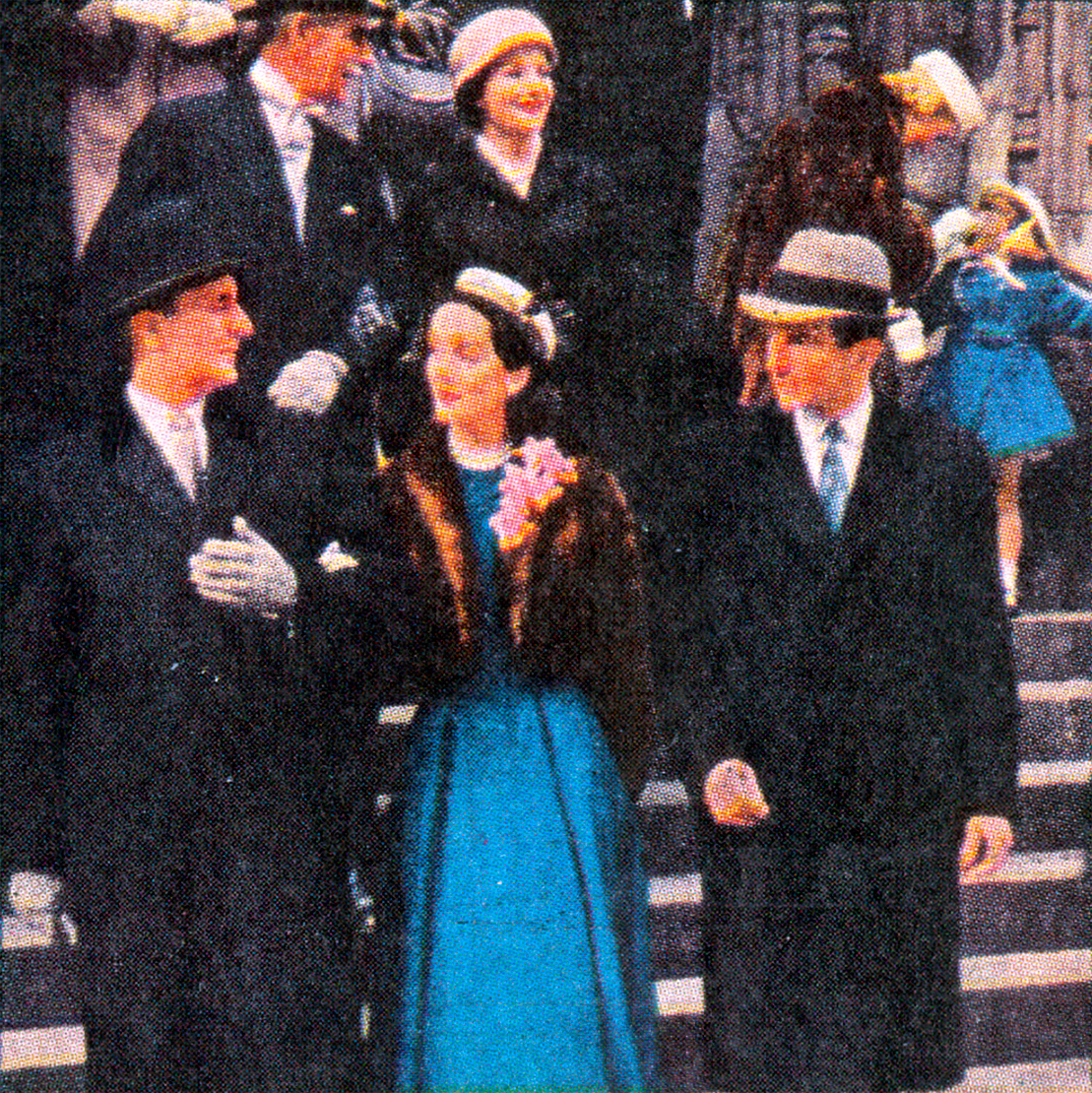

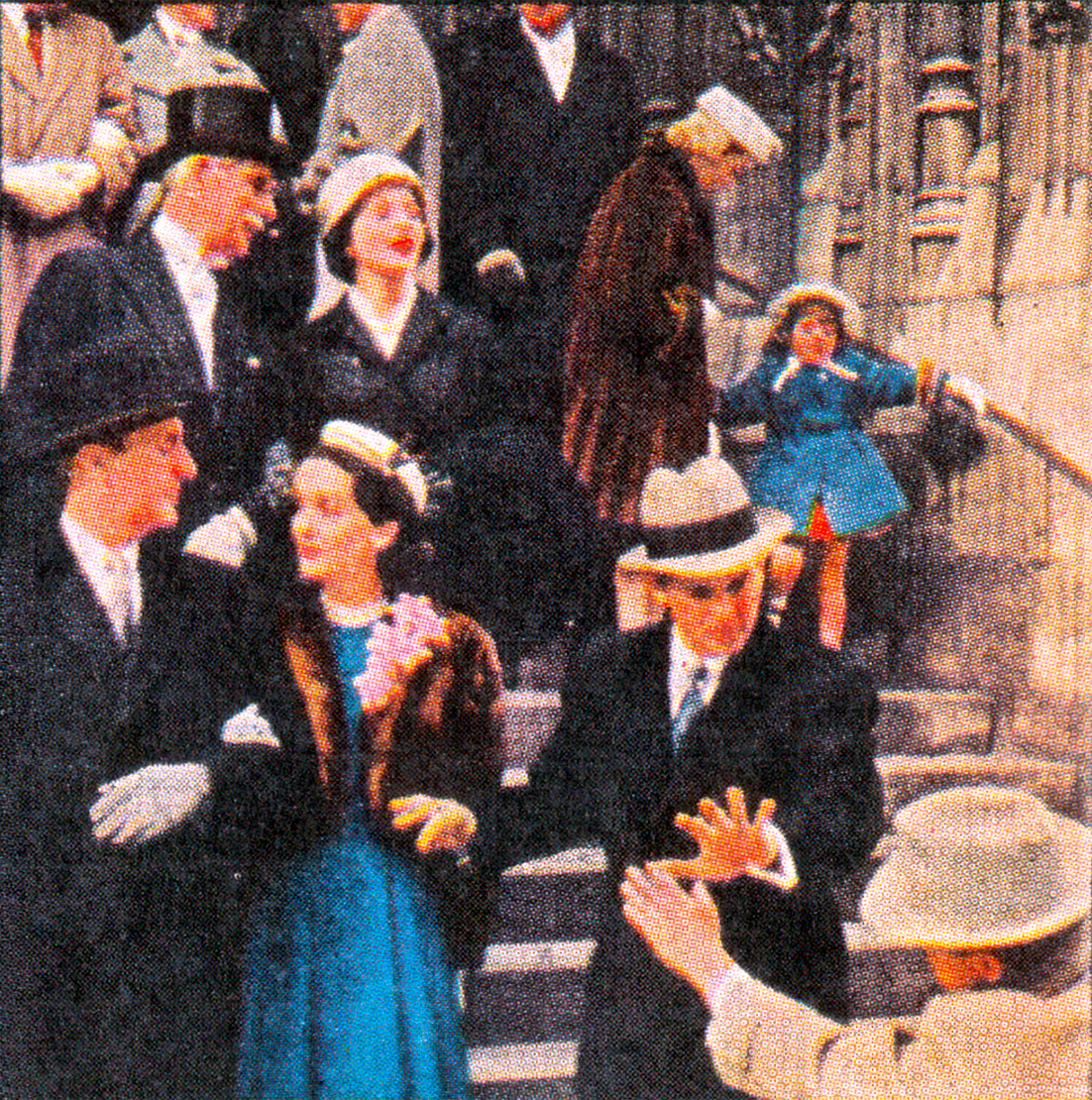

== Cast of characters ==
- Nero Wolfe — The private investigator
- Archie Goodwin — Wolfe's assistant, and the narrator of all Wolfe stories
- Millard Bynoe — Wealthy philanthropist and orchid fancier
- Mrs. Millard Bynoe — His young wife
- Henry Frimm — Executive Secretary of the Bynoe Rehabilitation Fund
- Tabby — An unsavory character who is comfortable with petty larceny
- Iris Innes, Joe Herrick, Alan Geiss, Augustus Pizzi — Magazine photographers
- Inspector Cramer — Representing Manhattan Homicide

== The unfamiliar word ==
"Readers of the Wolfe saga often have to turn to the dictionary because of the erudite vocabulary of Wolfe and sometimes of Archie," wrote Rev. Frederick G. Gotwald.

Examples of unfamiliar words — or unfamiliar uses of words that some would otherwise consider familiar — are found throughout the corpus, often in the give-and-take between Wolfe and Archie. These are included in "Easter Parade":

- Mogok ruby. Chapter 1.
- Found. Chapter 2. Chiefly British usage, postpositive.
- Peculated. Chapter 7.

== Publication history ==
=== "Easter Parade" ===
- 1957, Look, April 16, 1957 (as "The Easter Parade Murder")

=== And Four to Go ===
- 1958, New York: The Viking Press, April 29, 1958, hardcover. In the printing of "Easter Parade," a page presenting black-and-white versions of the four Look magazine photographs is placed between pages 96 and 97.

Contents include "Christmas Party", "Easter Parade", "Fourth of July Picnic" and "Murder Is No Joke"
In his limited-edition pamphlet, Collecting Mystery Fiction #10, Rex Stout's Nero Wolfe Part II, Otto Penzler describes the first edition of And Four to Go: "Blue cloth, front cover and spine printed with red; rear cover blank. Issued in a mainly brick red dust wrapper."
In April 2006, Firsts: The Book Collector's Magazine estimated that the first edition of And Four to Go had a value of between $200 and $350. The estimate is for a copy in very good to fine condition in a like dustjacket.

- 1958, New York: Viking (Mystery Guild), August 1958, hardcover. In the printing of "Easter Parade," a page presenting black-and-white versions of the four Look magazine photographs is placed between pages 96 and 97.

The far less valuable Viking book club edition may be distinguished from the first edition in three ways:

- The dust jacket has "Book Club Edition" printed on the inside front flap, and the price is absent (first editions may be price clipped if they were given as gifts).
- Book club editions are sometimes thinner and always taller (usually a quarter of an inch) than first editions.
- Book club editions are bound in cardboard, and first editions are bound in cloth (or have at least a cloth spine).

- 1959, London: Collins Crime Club, May 25, 1959, hardcover (as Crime and Again)
- 1959, New York: Bantam #A-2016, November 1959, paperback
- 1962, London: Fontana #629, 1962 (as Crime and Again)
- 1992, New York: Bantam Crime Line ISBN 0-553-24985-1 December 1992, paperback, Rex Stout Library edition with introduction by Jane Haddam
- 1997, Newport Beach, California: Books on Tape, Inc. ISBN 0-7366-4059-2 October 31, 1997, audio cassette (unabridged, read by Michael Prichard)
- 2010, New York: Bantam Crimeline ISBN 978-0-307-75569-8 July 21, 2010, e-book
