= Might as Well Be Dead =

1956 book by Rex Stout

- Author: Rex Stout
- Cover artist: Bill English
- Language: English
- Series: Nero Wolfe
- Genre: Detective fiction
- Publisher: Viking Press
- Publication date: October 26, 1956
- Publication place: United States
- Media type: Print (Hardcover)
- Pages: 186 pp. (first edition)
- OCLC: 1392369
- Preceded by: Three Witnesses
- Followed by: Three for the Chair

Might as Well Be Dead is a Nero Wolfe detective novel by Rex Stout, published by the Viking Press in 1956. The story was also collected in the omnibus volume Three Aces (Viking 1971).

== Plot introduction ==
Nero Wolfe is hired to find a missing person, who soon turns up — under a new name — as a newly convicted murderer in a sensational crime.

== Plot summary ==
As the book opens, James R. Herold, prosperous businessman from Omaha, Nebraska, consults Wolfe about re-establishing contact with his son, whom he had falsely accused of theft eleven years before. The son, Paul Herold, had consequently broken almost all ties with the family and moved to New York City, from where Paul sends his sisters and mother a birthday card. The father has placed advertisements in the local newspapers and consulted the Missing Persons Dept of NYPD, to no avail.

Wolfe suspects that the son has taken a new name and retained the same initials. Wolfe places an advertisement in the newspapers the following day advising P. H. that he is innocent of the crime of which he was once suspected. The crime is not described.

Meanwhile, a man known as Peter Hays is on trial for murder. The case is already with the jury, and a verdict is expected soon. Wolfe and Archie Goodwin hear from the police and the attorney defending Peter Hays as to the advertisement being an ill-timed statement to influence the trial. They explain that the notice refers to a crime 11 years earlier. Archie decides to visit the court room to decide if this P. H. might be the missing son of the client. Comparing the man he sees in court to old photos supplied by the father, Archie tentatively decides the two names refer to the same man.

Hays' attorney, Albert Freyer, suspects Archie of duplicity upon seeing Archie in the court room. Peter Hays is on trial for killing Michael Molloy, because police found him in the room with Molloy’s body. The jury finds him guilty.

Freyer meets Wolfe and Archie at Wolfe's office. Wolfe might collect a substantial fee by notifying his client that his son has been found quickly, and is found guilty of murder. That is not reasonable to Wolfe, telling his client the good and the very painful news at once. Identity is not yet certain; Freyer explains the difficulty of offering a good defense for his client. Peter Hays has refused to give his lawyer any information on his background, details that might match him to the son of Wolfe’s client. Peter Hays seems near hopelessness, saying Might as well be dead to describe how he feels. A personal meeting of Archie with Hays is needed. Freyer arranges this meeting at the prison. Archie is sure that Peter Hays is the son of Wolfe’s client.

Peter Hays has limited funds for an appeal of the trial’s outcome. To undertake an appeal for his innocent client, Freyer needs both Wolfe's investigative assistance and the financial backing of the father. Freyer reveals that Hays was framed for the murder, as he was called by telephone to the scene, being told that Molloy was beating his wife Selma. However, Selma was at a play with friends, the Irwins and the Arkoffs. Freyer starts an appeal and Wolfe delays informing his client for the time being.

Wolfe sends four operatives, including Johnny Keems, to investigate the friends and associates of Michael Molloy. The next day, the body of Johnny Keems is found killed by a hit-and-run driver. Keems’ pockets lack the cash that Archie gave him to bribe potential witnesses. Wolfe and Archie consider his murder to be linked to the Molloy murder and Wolfe now firmly believes in the innocence of Peter Hays. The police, specifically Cramer, rely on the outcome of the trial. Cramer begins further investigation after he meets with Wolfe who shares this development.

Saul finds Ella the housekeeper for the Irwins at the morgue, when he was seeking her alive. Archie brings Selma Molloy to the morgue for identification of the body, as she knows her. That news is shared with Cramer. Archie has Selma Molloy live at Nero Wolfe’s home until the case is resolved, not wanting her to be next. She authorizes a man she considers a friend, Patrick Degan, to act for her regarding her husband’s estate. Molloy died intestate. This lets Wolfe and others examine the contents of Molloy’s safe deposit box, which holds a lot of cash, about one-third of a million dollars, but no records. Selma is in shock from the death of her husband, with a heavier burden arising from Peter Hays. She loves him, and the guilty verdict has her saying that she might as well be dead.

Saul and Archie go to the home of Delia Brandt, secretary to Molloy, hoping to find an indication of Molloy’s business, something to give Wolfe a clue to the real murderer. They find her home in disarray and find her strangled. A key to a locker was taped to her body. That locker contains Molloy’s business records, the clue Wolfe needs to identify the murderer of Molloy and three others.

Wolfe calls a meeting at his office of Molloy’s friends, the parents of Paul Herold, William Lesser, and Cramer of the police. He announces Patrick Degan as the guilty man, and warns Fanny Irwin that she may be held as accessory. There is police work to be done to produce proof to stand up in court, and free Peter Hays of all suspicion. The appeal frees him.

There is a happy ending for Peter Hays and Selma, who marry.

== Cast of characters ==
- Archie Goodwin — amanuensis to Nero Wolfe
- James R. Herold — businessman from Omaha
- Nero Wolfe — brilliant detective, orchid fancier, and gourmand
- Lieutenant Murphy — an NYPD officer in the Missing Persons Bureau of the NYPD
- Purley Stebbins — Sergeant in the NYC Homicide Squad
- Albert Freyer — defense lawyer for Peter Hays in the murder trial
- Paul Herold son of James Herold; wrongly accused of theft 11 years before
- Peter Hays — a man on trial for murder; alias of Paul Herold
- Michael Molloy — As the book opens, Peter Hays is being tried for Molloy's murder
- Selma Molloy — wife of Michael Molloy, in love with Peter Hays
- Saul Panzer, Fred Durkin, Orrie Cather — private detectives often called upon by Wolfe
- Johnny Keems — A recurring character similar to Panzer, Durkin and Cather in earlier Nero Wolfe novels
- Delia Brandt — secretary and possible mistress of Michael Molloy
- Thomas Irwin and Fanny Irwin — friends of Selma Malloy
- Jerome Arkoff and Rita Arkoff — friends of Selma Molloy living in the same building as the Irwins
- Ella Reyes — live-in housekeeper of the Irwins
- William Lesser — Fiancé of Delia Brandt
- Inspector Cramer — head of the Manhattan Homicide Squad
- Patrick Degan — treasurer of a major trade union, friend and business partner of Michael Molloy

== Adaptations ==
=== Television ===
==== Nero Wolfe (Paramount Television) ====
Might as Well Be Dead was adapted as the fifth episode of Nero Wolfe (1981), an NBC TV series starring William Conrad as Nero Wolfe and Lee Horsley as Archie Goodwin. Other members of the regular cast include George Voskovec (Fritz Brenner), Robert Coote (Theodore Horstmann), George Wyner (Saul Panzer) and Allan Miller (Inspector Cramer). Guest stars include Gail Youngs (Margaret [Selma] Molloy), Bruce Gray (Patrick Degan), A.C. Weary (Peter Hays), Michael Currie (Albert Freyer), Lana Wood (Delia Brandt), Stephen Elliott (Mr. Herold) and John de Lancie (Tom Irwin). Directed by George McCowan from a teleplay by Seeleg Lester, "Might as Well Be Dead" aired February 13, 1981.

=== Stage ===
==== Might as Well Be Dead (2017) ====
A stage adaptation of Might as Well Be Dead was commissioned by Park Square Theatre in Saint Paul, Minnesota. The second stage production to be authorized by the estate of Rex Stout, Might as Well Be Dead: A Nero Wolfe Mystery was written by Joseph Goodrich and directed by Peter Moore, who were also responsible for an adaptation of The Red Box at the same theater in 2014. E.J. Subkoviak (Nero Wolfe), Michael Paul Levin (Inspector Cramer) and Jim Pounds (Fritz Brenner) reprised their roles; Archie Goodwin was played by Derek Dirlam. Previews began on June 16, 2017, and the production ran June 23 – July 30, 2017.

== Publication history ==
- 1956, New York: Viking Press, October 26, 1956, hardcover

In his limited-edition pamphlet, Collecting Mystery Fiction #10, Rex Stout's Nero Wolfe Part II, Otto Penzler describes the first edition of Might as Well Be Dead: "Bright blue-green boards, chartreuse cloth spine, printed with blue-green; front and rear covers blank. Issued in a mainly blue pictorial dust wrapper."
In April 2006, Firsts: The Book Collector's Magazine estimated that the first edition of Might as Well Be Dead had a value of between $200 and $350. The estimate is for a copy in very good to fine condition in a like dustjacket.

- 1957, New York: Viking Press (Mystery Guild), February 1957, hardcover

The far less valuable Viking book club edition may be distinguished from the first edition in three ways:

- The dust jacket has "Book Club Edition" printed on the inside front flap, and the price is absent (first editions may be price clipped if they were given as gifts).
- Book club editions are sometimes thinner and always taller (usually a quarter of an inch) than first editions.
- Book club editions are bound in cardboard, and first editions are bound in cloth (or have at least a cloth spine).

- 1957, London: Collins Crime Club, 1957, hardcover
- 1958, New York: Bantam #A1795, July 1958, paperback
- 1971, New York: The Viking Press, Three Aces: A Nero Wolfe Omnibus (with Too Many Clients and The Final Deduction), May 10, 1971, hardcover
- 1973, London: Fontana, April 1973
- 1995, New York: Bantam Books ISBN 0-553-76303-2 January 2, 1995, paperback
- 2004, Auburn, California: The Audio Partners Publishing Corp., Mystery Masters ISBN 1-57270-414-4 November 2004, audio CD (unabridged, read by Michael Prichard)
- 2010, New York: Bantam ISBN 978-0-307-75604-6 April 28, 2010, e-book
