= Murder Is No Joke =

- Short story by Rex Stout
- Country: United States
- Language: English
- Genre: Detective fiction

Publication
- Published in: And Four to Go
- Publisher: Viking Press
- Media type: Hardcover
- Publication date: April 29, 1958
- Series: Nero Wolfe

"Murder Is No Joke" is a Nero Wolfe mystery novella by Rex Stout, first published in the 1958 short-story collection And Four to Go (Viking Press).

Stout subsequently rewrote and expanded the story as "Frame-Up for Murder", serialized in three issues of The Saturday Evening Post (June 21–July 5, 1958). It is the only time Stout rewrote and expanded a story for a magazine. "Frame-Up for Murder" was collected for the first time in book form in the Bantam Books short-story collection, Death Times Three (1985).

== Plot summary ==
Nero Wolfe returned to The Saturday Evening Post on June 21, 1958, with "Frame-Up for Murder", Rex Stout's expanded rewrite of "Murder Is No Joke"

Alec Gallant was a member of the French Resistance during World War II and at that time married another member, Bianca. After the war, he learned that his wife and her two brothers had been traitors to the Resistance. He murdered both men, but Bianca escaped him.

Gallant came to the United States in 1945 and rejoined his sister Flora, who had immigrated from France several years earlier. Gallant became a highly regarded couturier (as Wolfe later terms him, "an illustrious dressmaker") with a studio employing several staff, including Flora. A successful Broadway actress, Sarah Yare, is a valued customer, one who is well liked by all of Gallant's employees.

Into this happy mix comes Bianca. She has changed her surname to Voss and insinuated herself into Gallant's operation, making decisions about company strategy, apparently with Gallant's approval. Gallant has kept information about his past with Bianca to himself, hiding it not only from the staff but also from his sister, Flora. Everyone at Alec Gallant Incorporated is mystified that Gallant is putting up with Bianca's odd and counterproductive decisions, particularly because she seems to have no formal title or position at the company.

Fearing for her brother's career, Flora calls at Nero Wolfe's office and asks him to investigate the situation. She has only $100 to pay Wolfe's fee, but she says that her brother would be grateful to be rid of Miss Voss, and he is a generous man. Wolfe points out, though, that it's not Mr. Gallant who would be hiring him. Flora suggests that they phone Bianca, and invite her to Wolfe's office where he can ask questions of her, and then, "We shall see." In reporting this exchange, Archie Goodwin claims that it is Flora's choice of phrasing, instead of an informal "We'll see" or "We will see," that moves Wolfe to acquiesce.

Flora uses Archie's phone to call Miss Voss, and gives Archie the handset as Wolfe picks up his own phone. After identifying himself to Miss Voss, Wolfe becomes the target of a string of insults hurled by Miss Voss – "You are scum, I know, in your stinking sewer." – and then both Wolfe and Archie hear a thud, a groan, a crash, and a dead phone line.

Archie calls Gallant's offices back, and asks for Miss Voss. Archie and Wolfe learn that Miss Voss has just been found dead in her office. When they inform Flora, she seems stunned, and hurries from the office.

Later, discussing the situation with Inspector Cramer, Wolfe agrees it's very neat that Wolfe and Archie were on the phone with Miss Voss just as she was being assaulted, and thus can fix the time of the attack within a minute or two. That makes it difficult, because everyone at Gallant's studio has a strong alibi for that time.

The next day, Archie is summoned to the District Attorney's office to go over his statement once again. When he returns to the brownstone, he is astonished to see that Wolfe has exerted himself to the point of getting the phone book from Archie's desk and taking it to his own. Wolfe has no explanation of the phone book for Archie, but he does have instructions.

== Cast of characters ==
- Nero Wolfe — The private investigator
- Archie Goodwin — Wolfe's assistant, and the narrator of all Wolfe stories
- Alec Gallant — Couturier
- Flora Gallant — His sister
- Bianca Voss — Murder victim
- Carl Drew — Gallant's business manager
- Anita Prince — Fitter
- Emmy Thorne — In charge of promotions
- Sarah Yare — Broadway actress and Gallant client
- Inspector Cramer and Sergeant Stebbins— Representing Manhattan Homicide

== Publication history ==
=== "Murder is No Joke" ===
- 1958, The Saturday Evening Post, June 21 + June 28 + July 5, 1958 (expanded as "Frame-Up for Murder")
- 1961, The Delights of Detection, ed. by Jacques Barzun, New York: Criterion Books, 1961
- 1964, Three Times Three: Mystery Omnibus (volume three), ed. by Howard Haycraft and John Beecroft, New York: Doubleday, 1964
- 1970, Ellery Queen's Mystery Magazine, November 1970
- 1978, Ellery Queen's Anthology, Spring–Summer 1978
- 1978, Ellery Queen's Masks of Mystery, New York: Davis Publications, 1978, hardcover

=== And Four to Go ===
- 1958, New York: The Viking Press, April 29, 1958, hardcover

Contents include "Christmas Party", "Easter Parade", "Fourth of July Picnic" and "Murder Is No Joke"
In his limited-edition pamphlet, Collecting Mystery Fiction #10, Rex Stout's Nero Wolfe Part II, Otto Penzler describes the first edition of And Four to Go: "Blue cloth, front cover and spine printed with red; rear cover blank. Issued in a mainly brick red dust wrapper."
In April 2006, Firsts: The Book Collector's Magazine estimated that the first edition of And Four to Go had a value of between $200 and $350. The estimate is for a copy in very good to fine condition in a like dustjacket.

- 1958, New York: Viking (Mystery Guild), August 1958, hardcover. In the printing of "Easter Parade," a page presenting black-and-white versions of the four Look magazine photographs is placed between pages 96 and 97.

The far less valuable Viking book club edition may be distinguished from the first edition in three ways:

- The dust jacket has "Book Club Edition" printed on the inside front flap, and the price is absent (first editions may be price clipped if they were given as gifts).
- Book club editions are sometimes thinner and always taller (usually a quarter of an inch) than first editions.
- Book club editions are bound in cardboard, and first editions are bound in cloth (or have at least a cloth spine).

- 1959, London: Collins Crime Club, May 25, 1959, hardcover (as Crime and Again)
- 1959, New York: Bantam #A-2016, November 1959, paperback
- 1962, London: Fontana #629, 1962 (as Crime and Again)
- 1992, New York: Bantam Crime Line ISBN 0-553-24985-1 December 1992, paperback, Rex Stout Library edition with introduction by Jane Haddam
- 1997, Newport Beach, California: Books on Tape, Inc. ISBN 0-7366-4059-2 October 31, 1997, audio cassette (unabridged, read by Michael Prichard)
- 2010, New York: Bantam Crimeline ISBN 978-0-307-75569-8 July 21, 2010, e-book

== Adaptations ==
=== Nero Wolfe (CBC Radio) ===
"Murder Is No Joke" was adapted as the final episode of the Canadian Broadcasting Corporation's 13-part radio series Nero Wolfe (1982), starring Mavor Moore as Nero Wolfe, Don Francks as Archie Goodwin, and Cec Linder as Inspector Cramer. Written and directed by Toronto actor and producer Ron Hartmann, the hour-long adaptation aired on CBC Stereo April 10, 1982.
