= The Final Deduction =

Book by Rex Stout

- Author: Rex Stout
- Cover artist: Bill English
- Language: English
- Series: Nero Wolfe
- Genre: Detective fiction
- Publisher: Viking Press
- Publication date: October 13, 1961
- Publication place: United States
- Media type: Print (Hardcover)
- Pages: 182 pp. (first edition)
- OCLC: 1156649
- Preceded by: Too Many Clients
- Followed by: Homicide Trinity

The Final Deduction is a Nero Wolfe detective novel by Rex Stout, published by the Viking Press in 1961 and collected in the omnibus volume Three Aces (Viking 1971).

== Plot introduction ==
Mrs. Althea Vail tells Wolfe she intends to pay the half-a-million-dollar ransom to the kidnappers, but she wants him to be certain she gets her husband Jimmy back alive and in one piece.

== Plot summary ==
Former actress Althea Vail hires Nero Wolfe to ensure her kidnapped husband Jimmy is returned home alive and well, saying that she received a ransom note and phone call from a "Mr. Knapp" demanding a $500,000 ransom, which she intends to pay. Over the client's objections of secrecy, Wolfe demands to see Mrs. Vail's secretary Dinah Utley, who read the note and heard the phone call, and places an advertisement in the newspapers threatening to uncover Mr. Knapp's identity if Jimmy Vail is not returned safely. From the interview with Utley and comparing her typing style with the ransom note, Wolfe and Archie conclude that she wrote the note and is therefore implicated in the kidnapping.

Two days later, Althea reports that Jimmy has returned home safely and tells Wolfe and Archie to keep quiet about the kidnapping for 48 hours, as Jimmy promised his abductors he would. Jimmy comes to the brownstone to speak with Wolfe, but during the visit, Althea phones for her husband, having been told by a policeman that Dinah Utley has been found murdered. After traveling to White Plains to identify the body, Archie drives to the client's home, where he informs the household - Althea; Jimmy; Noel and Margot Tedder, Althea's children from a previous marriage; Ralph Purcell, Althea's brother; and Andrew Frost, Althea's attorney - that the report has been confirmed: Utley was knocked out on Iron Mine Road and run over by her own car. In shock, Althea claims that the kidnappers must have killed her, as she was instructed to deliver the money through a series of phone calls and notes that led her to Iron Mine Road for the ransom drop. Archie also discovers that Utley's typewriter has disappeared.

Archie concludes that Jimmy Vail was also in on the kidnapping, but learns the next morning that Jimmy has died, his chest crushed by a statue of Benjamin Franklin in his home library. Archie calls Lon Cohen and gives him all the information about the kidnapping to be published after the 48-hour deadline has passed, then reports his conclusions to Wolfe. Knowing that the police could come at any minute, Wolfe and Archie hide out in Dr. Edwin Vollmer's house until the deadline imposed by Jimmy has passed.

From the Gazette's article and a conversation with Inspector Cramer, Wolfe and Archie learn that the case is open, the police undecided as to whether Jimmy was murdered or, in a slumber, accidentally pulled the statue onto himself. Their job for Althea Vail complete, Wolfe and Archie are pulled back into the case by Noel Tedder, who wants to hire them to find the ransom money, as Althea told him that he could have it if he found it. Wolfe accepts, Noel promising a fifth of the money as a fee, minutes ahead of a call from Margot Tedder asking to hire Wolfe for the same job but for far less a fee. Wolfe tells Noel - and in a later meeting, Ralph Purcell - that Jimmy was murdered, as he was not drunk enough to make such a fatal error as pulling a statue on him, and even a sleepy man should be able to avoid a falling statue; therefore, Jimmy Vail was drugged, and someone else pushed the statue onto his chest.

Returning to the Vail-Tedder home, Archie speaks with Althea, who dismisses Wolfe's theory of murder and says that she is taking back what she said about Noel keeping the ransom money. Archie dines with Noel and, using a fabricated story about his own dominating mother, encourages him to stand up to her. After Noel delivers a paper to his mother standing by the initial agreement, Andrew Frost visits Wolfe, disputing the agreement and the claim of murder. Once Frost has left, Wolfe summons Noel along with Saul Panzer, Fred Durkin, and Orrie Cather, and sends them to the Vail-Tedder country house, where he has concluded the money is hidden. Archie finds the money in a trunk of bird's eggs, again only minutes ahead of Margot. After Noel has claimed the money and paid each of the detectives, Ben Dykes and Cramer arrive with a warrant for Archie and a legal summons for Wolfe, filed by Althea on an accusation of grand larceny. Wolfe convinces the police to postpone issuing the warrants until the next day, then calls Althea to the brownstone.

With Althea Vail in the red leather chair, Wolfe details his conclusions: having observed the other members of the household, he has dismissed any of them as being party in the kidnapping, therefore Althea Vail herself was the final party in the kidnapping and the murderer of Dinah Utley and Jimmy Vail. The Vails contrived the kidnapping so the ransom money could be written off as a casualty, allowing them to keep the $500,000 without paying tax on it. They convinced Utley to participate - she wrote the ransom notes and transcribed the phone call that was never made - but after her meeting with Wolfe, Utley became frightened of exposure, disposing of the typewriter on her way to Iron Mine Road. Her fear convinced Althea that she would expose the plan, so Althea killed her. When Jimmy Vail learned, he realized his wife had killed Utley, so he had to die too. Wolfe claims that Jimmy had demanded the entire share of the ransom for his silence, but Althea blurts out that Jimmy had actually said he would leave her because she killed Dinah Utley.

After Althea leaves, Wolfe has Archie deliver a recording of their conversation to Cramer, speculating that Althea may commit suicide rather than face a trial. In an epilogue, Archie reveals that Althea is still alive, her first trial having ended in a hung jury, and that he will only publish the report of the case if the second jury convicts her.

== The unfamiliar word ==
"I work for Nero Wolfe," Archie Goodwin says in Please Pass the Guilt (chapter 10). "He knows more words than Shakespeare knew."

In most Nero Wolfe novels and novellas, there is at least one unfamiliar word, usually spoken by Wolfe. The word "subdolous" appears in chapter 5, when Archie informs Wolfe that Ben Dykes, head of the Westchester County detectives, is at the door. Wolfe speaks to Archie:

"You haven't reported."
"I reported all you said you wanted."
"That's subdolous. Let him in."
As I went to the front I was making a mental note not to look up "subdolous." That trick of his, closing an argument by using a word he knew damn well I had never heard, was probably subdolous.

== Cast of characters ==
- Nero Wolfe — The private investigator
- Archie Goodwin — Wolfe's assistant, and the narrator of all Wolfe stories
- Mrs. Althea Vail — Retired actress and wealthy widow, married four years to Jimmy Vail
- Jimmy Vail — Handsome, younger husband of Althea Vail
- Dinah Utley — Althea Vail's secretary
- Noel Tedder — Twenty-three-year-old brat son of Althea Vail
- Margot Tedder — Althea Vail's daughter, Noel's younger sister
- Helen Blount — Friend of Althea Vail
- Ralph Purcell — Althea Vail's brother
- Andrew Frost — Althea Vail's attorney
- Clark Hobart — District Attorney of Westchester County
- Ben Dykes — Head of Westchester County detectives
- Capt. Saunders — State police
- Lon Cohen — Journalist at the Gazette and friend of Archie Goodwin
- Doctor Vollmer — Wolfe's neighbor
- Helen Gillard — Doc Vollmer's assistant
- Inspector Cramer — NYPD Homicide West
- Sergeant Purley Stebbins — NYPD Homicide West
- Mandel — Assistant District Attorney
- Saul Panzer, Fred Durkin and Orrie Cather — Detectives employed by Wolfe

== Paladin ==
The Wolfe novels occasionally mention contemporary culture. Archie notes "An FBI man draws his credentials automatically, the way Paladin draws his gun." This references the fictional gunslinger Paladin, the main character in the television and radio Western series Have Gun – Will Travel.

== Reviews and commentary ==
- Jacques Barzun and Wendell Hertig Taylor, A Catalogue of Crime — Archie not at his best and not amusing, though we do get information about his mother, and Wolfe has some fair repartee. The kidnapping and ransoming, for once, dully treated. ... Nero is ingenious in getting his fee, Archie subtle as well as useful, and Inspector Cramer able to work off his anger outside the house.

== Publication history ==
- 1961, New York: The Viking Press, October 13, 1961, hardcover

In his limited-edition pamphlet, Collecting Mystery Fiction #10, Rex Stout's Nero Wolfe Part II, Otto Penzler describes the first edition of The Final Deduction: "Red cloth, front cover and spine printed with blue. Issued in a mainly red dust wrapper."
In April 2006, Firsts: The Book Collector's Magazine estimated that the first edition of The Final Deduction had a value of between $150 and $300. The estimate is for a copy in very good to fine condition in a like dustjacket.

- 1962, New York: Viking (Mystery Guild), February 1962, hardcover

The far less valuable Viking book club edition may be distinguished from the first edition in three ways:

- The dust jacket has "Book Club Edition" printed on the inside front flap, and the price is absent (first editions may be price clipped if they were given as gifts).
- Book club editions are sometimes thinner and always taller (usually a quarter of an inch) than first editions.
- Book club editions are bound in cardboard, and first editions are bound in cloth (or have at least a cloth spine).

- 1962, London: Collins Crime Club, April 30, 1962, hardcover
- 1963, New York: Bantam #J2534, March 1963, paperback
- 1967, London: Fontana, 1967, paperback
- 1971, New York: The Viking Press, Three Aces: A Nero Wolfe Omnibus (with Might as Well Be Dead and Too Many Clients), May 10, 1971, hardcover
- 1985, New York: Bantam Books ISBN 0-553-25254-2 November 1985, 4th Printing, paperback, $2.95
- 1995, New York: Bantam Books ISBN 0-553-76310-5 November 1, 1995, paperback
- 2006, Auburn, California: The Audio Partners Publishing Corp., Mystery Masters ISBN 1-57270-566-3 December 28, 2006, audio CD (unabridged, read by Michael Prichard)
- 2010, New York: Bantam ISBN 978-0-307-75593-3 April 28, 2010, e-book
