= William L. DeAndrea =

American novelist

William Louis DeAndrea
- Born: July 1, 1952; Port Chester, New York
- Died: November 9, 1996 (aged 44)
- Education: Syracuse University

William Louis DeAndrea (July 1, 1952 – October 9, 1996) was an American mystery writer and columnist.

== Biography ==
DeAndrea was born in Port Chester, New York, in 1952 and was educated at Syracuse University. During the 1980s his job took him to Europe, first to Paris and then London; on his return to the United States he settled in Litchfield County, Connecticut. He won three Edgar Awards from the Mystery Writers of America, the first for his first novel, Killed in the Ratings. The majority of his novels made up several series. The Matt Cobb mysteries drew on DeAndrea's experience working for a major American television network. The Niccolo Benedetti mysteries paid homage to great detectives such as Nero Wolfe. (DeAndrea was an active member of The Wolfe Pack when he lived in New York.) The Clifford Driscoll series ventured into the realm of the spy thriller, while the Lobo Blacke/Quinn Booker series of historical mysteries—also reminiscent of the Wolfe stories—were set in the old West. DeAndrea was also the author of the J’Accuse! column in the Armchair Detective, a fanzine published by Mysterious Press. He won his third Edgar in 1994 for his reference work, Encyclopedia Mysteriosa.

In 1982, he participated in the intercontinental quiz show Top of the World, which pitted contestants via satellite from Australia, the US and the UK. DeAndrea emerged as the American champion (thanks to his knowledge of Ellery Queen) and was invited to the final in London, but lost out to British insurance broker James Eccleson. He was married to mystery writer Jane Haddam, and died of cancer on October 9, 1996.

== Bibliography ==
The Lunatic Fringe (1980)

Five O'clock Lightning (1982)

The Matt Cobb Mysteries:

- Killed in the Ratings 1978 (Edgar winner: Best First Novel)
- Killed in Fringe Time 1994
- Killed in the Fog 1996
- Killed in Paradise 1988
- Killed in the Act 1981
- Killed on the Ice 1984
- Killed on the Rocks 1990
- Killed With a Passion 1983

The Professor Niccolo Benedetti Mysteries:

- The HOG Murders 1979 (Edgar winner: Best Paperback Original)
- The Manx Murders 1992
- The Werewolf Murders 1994

The Clifford Driscoll series:

- Atropos
- Azrael
- Cronus
- Snark

The Lobo Blacke/Quinn Booker Mysteries:

- Fatal Elixir
- Written in Fire

As Philip DeGrave:

- Unholy Moses
- Keep the Baby, Faith (Bogie's Mystery)

Collection:

- Murder — All Kinds (Crippen & Landru, 2003)

Non-Fiction

- Encyclopedia Mysteriosa
