= Death of a Demon =

- Short story by Rex Stout
- Country: United States
- Language: English
- Genre: Detective fiction

Publication
- Published in: The Saturday Evening Post
- Publication type: Periodical
- Publication date: June 1961
- Series: Nero Wolfe

"Death of a Demon" is a Nero Wolfe mystery novella by Rex Stout, first serialized in three issues of The Saturday Evening Post (June 10, 17 and 24, 1961). It first appeared in book form in the short-story collection Homicide Trinity, published by the Viking Press in 1962.

== Plot summary ==
"Death of a Demon" was serialized in three issues of The Saturday Evening Post (June 10–24, 1961), illustrated by Austin Briggs

Lucy Hazen has a preemptive confession to make to Nero Wolfe – having come to despise her husband Barry, a cruel public relations counsellor, she has recently become plagued by thoughts of shooting him with his own gun. In order to deter herself from following through on this impulse, she has decided to confess this to Nero Wolfe, knowing that if she did commit the crime he would reveal the act to the police. Although bemused by the meeting, Wolfe humors her and agrees to show her his orchid collection, but while they are upstairs Archie Goodwin hears on the radio that Barry Hazen's body has been discovered in an alley, shot in the back.

Despite Lucy's confession, Archie is convinced by her reaction when he informs her of her husband's murder that she is innocent of the crime. Wolfe and Archie learn from Lucy that she last saw her husband at a dinner party held the previous evening for a group of his clients – Mrs. Victor Oliver, Anne Talbot, Jules Khoury and Ambrose Perdis – and his copy-writer Theodore Weed, whom Lucy clearly harbors feelings for. Although similarly convinced of her innocence, Wolfe is reluctant to accept Lucy as his client and sends her away, though he keeps the gun in his possession for safe-keeping. Using an old mattress, Archie acquires a fired bullet from the gun and turns it over to Inspector Cramer for comparison.

Lucy is detained as a suspect in her husband's murder, and hires Wolfe to exonerate her. Theodore Weed approaches Wolfe, also offering to hire him. He admits that he is in love with Lucy Hazen and that Barry Hazen knew this, taking pleasure from his discomfort about the situation when in her presence. He reveals his suspicions that his employer was extorting money from his clients. Via Nathaniel Parker, Wolfe's attorney, Lucy gives Wolfe a key to her apartment, and informs him that her husband had given her instructions in the event of his death; she was to locate a metal box hidden in their home, empty the contents, and destroy them.

Archie Goodwin is dispatched to acquire the box, but on arriving at the Hazen residence discovers that the guests from the dinner party are already there, clearly searching the apartment. He manages to hold them at gunpoint, and – after locating the box – brings them to Wolfe's brownstone. The guests confirm that Hazen was blackmailing them, and inform Wolfe that he took sadistic pleasure in taunting each person with hints about what they had done. Wolfe and Archie open the box only to discover it is empty, but Wolfe nevertheless claims to each guest that he will sell them the contents of the box for $250,000 each.

Inspector Cramer arrives at the brownstone in a gloating mood, revealing that the police have discovered the gun that Lucy Hazen apparently used to murder her husband – a pistol that her father used to commit suicide. The gun is of the same make as the one Lucy brought to Wolfe, however, and the bullet from the first gun did not match the bullet that killed Barry Hazen. This leads Wolfe to a conclusion, which is further confirmed that evening when, alone of the others, Jules Khoury refuses to give Wolfe any money for the contents of the box.

Wolfe reveals that the box was empty and accuses Khoury of murdering Barry Hazen. He admits that he has no evidence, but argues that Hazen's hints and the specific gun used strongly imply that Khoury's secret was that he actually murdered Lucy's father, his former business partner. Furthermore, Khoury's refusal to pay Wolfe suggest that he knew all along that the box was empty, having located and destroyed the evidence after murdering Hazen. His use of the duplicate gun was an attempt to frame Lucy for the crime. Khoury is arrested and evidence is discovered tying him to both murders, and Lucy and Theodore admit their feelings for each other.

== Cast of characters ==
- Nero Wolfe — The private investigator
- Archie Goodwin — Wolfe's assistant (and the narrator of all Wolfe stories)
- Lucy Hazen — Wolfe's client, newly widowed by her husband's murder
- Barry Hazen — Public relations counselor, apparent blackmailer, and murder victim
- Jules Khoury, Mrs. Victor Oliver, Ambrose Perdis, Mrs. Henry Talbot — Clients of Hazen's firm, who pay him much more than his services are worth
- Theodore Weed — Employed as a copy writer by Mr. Hazen
- Inspector Cramer — Representing Manhattan Homicide

== Publication history ==
=== "Death of a Demon" ===
- 1961, The Saturday Evening Post, June 10 + June 17 + June 24, 1961
- 1974, Ellery Queen's Mystery Magazine, October 1974 (as "The Gun Puzzle")
- 1977, Ellery Queen's Anthology, Fall–Winter 1977 (as "The Gun Puzzle")
- 1977, Ellery Queen's Faces of Mystery, New York: Davis Publications, 1977, hardcover (as "The Gun Puzzle")

=== Homicide Trinity ===
- 1962, New York: The Viking Press, April 26, 1962, hardcover

Contents include "Eeny Meeny Murder Mo", "Death of a Demon" and "Counterfeit for Murder".
In his limited-edition pamphlet, Collecting Mystery Fiction #10, Rex Stout's Nero Wolfe Part II, Otto Penzler describes the first edition of Homicide Trinity: "Blue cloth, front cover stamped in blind; spine printed with deep pink; rear cover blank. Issued in a mainly blue dust wrapper."
In April 2006, Firsts: The Book Collector's Magazine estimated that the first edition of Homicide Trinity had a value of between $150 and $350. The estimate is for a copy in very good to fine condition in a like dustjacket.

- 1962, Toronto: Macmillan, 1962, hardcover
- 1962, New York: Viking (Mystery Guild), August 1962, hardcover

The far less valuable Viking book club edition may be distinguished from the first edition in three ways:

- The dust jacket has "Book Club Edition" printed on the inside front flap, and the price is absent (first editions may be price clipped if they were given as gifts).
- Book club editions are sometimes thinner and always taller (usually a quarter of an inch) than first editions.
- Book club editions are bound in cardboard, and first editions are bound in cloth (or have at least a cloth spine).

- 1963, London: Collins Crime Club, February 18, 1963, hardcover
- 1966, New York: Bantam #F-3118, February 1966, paperback
- 1993, New York: Bantam Crime Line ISBN 0-553-23446-3 August 1993, paperback, Rex Stout Library edition with introduction by Stephen Greenleaf
- 1997, Newport Beach, California: Books on Tape, Inc. ISBN 0-7366-4062-2 October 31, 1997, audio cassette (unabridged, read by Michael Prichard)
- 2010, New York: Bantam Crimeline ISBN 978-0-307-75599-5 July 7, 2010, e-book

== Adaptations ==
=== Nero Wolfe (CBC Radio) ===
"Death of a Demon" was adapted as the 12th episode of the Canadian Broadcasting Corporation's 13-part radio series Nero Wolfe (1982), starring Mavor Moore as Nero Wolfe, Don Francks as Archie Goodwin, and Cec Linder as Inspector Cramer. Written and directed by Toronto actor and producer Ron Hartmann, the hour-long adaptation aired on CBC Stereo April 3, 1982.
