= Eeny Meeny Murder Mo =

- Short story by Rex Stout
- Country: United States
- Language: English
- Genre: Detective fiction

Publication
- Published in: Ellery Queen's Mystery Magazine
- Publication type: Periodical
- Publication date: March 1962
- Series: Nero Wolfe

"Eeny Meeny Murder Mo" is a Nero Wolfe mystery novella by Rex Stout, first published in the March 1962 issue of Ellery Queen's Mystery Magazine (#220). It first appeared in book form in the short-story collection Homicide Trinity, published by the Viking Press in 1962.

== Plot summary ==
Bertha Aaron, a secretary at a law firm, comes to the brownstone to hire Wolfe to investigate a possibly serious ethical lapse by a member of the firm. She has no appointment and arrives during Wolfe's afternoon orchid session, so Archie gets the particulars from her.

The firm she works for is representing Morton Sorell in a messy, highly publicized divorce. A few evenings ago, Aaron noticed a junior member of the law firm – she won't say which one – in a cheap eatery, tête-à-tête with Mrs. Rita Sorell, the firm's opponent in the divorce action. That sort of ex parte communication is highly improper. Later, she asked the lawyer about it, and he wouldn't discuss the matter. She won't take the problem to the firm's senior member, Lamont Otis, because she fears that the news, coupled with Otis's advanced age and heart condition, will kill him. But it has to be investigated.

It's a novel problem, and Archie takes the unusual step of consulting Wolfe in the plant rooms. Because the case concerns a divorce, it's one that Wolfe normally would not touch. But because legal ethics, not the divorce itself, is the central issue, Archie thinks there's a chance Wolfe will take it. Even so, Wolfe tells Archie he won't do it, and Archie returns to the office to give Aaron the bad news.

Back in the office, Archie finds he can't give the news to her because she's dead, hit on the head with a heavy paperweight and then strangled with a necktie. It's Wolfe's paperweight. Even worse, it's Wolfe's necktie. He had spilled some sauce on it at lunch, removed it, and left it on his desk where someone could find it and use it to strangle Bertha Aaron.

Late that night, after Inspector Cramer and other police investigators have left, Otis arrives, along with one of the law firm's associates, Ann Paige. The death of his valued secretary has upset Otis, and he wants to know what happened.

Wolfe allows Otis to read a copy of the statement Archie gave the police, and Otis is clearly shaken by the report of the ex parte communication. Otis asks Paige to leave Wolfe's office – he wants to discuss things privately – and Archie escorts her to the front room. Wolfe and Otis discuss the situation at length, and Wolfe gets Otis's take on the three junior members of the firm, one of whom Aaron saw talking with Mrs. Sorell. During their discussion, Archie checks on Paige, and finds that she has opened the window in the front room and, apparently, jumped down to the sidewalk. She is nowhere to be found.

The next morning, Archie calls on Rita Sorell, using as entrée a note he's written, informing her that she and the unidentified junior member were seen together in the restaurant. He wants to bring her to talk with Wolfe, but she plays dumb, and the best Archie can get from her is a promise to phone later in the day.

On returning to the brownstone, Archie finds the office occupied only by a man he doesn't recognize. He finds Wolfe at the peephole, and learns that the man's name is Gregory Jett, one of the law firm's junior members. Jett is there to complain that Wolfe's behavior caused Otis undue stress. Brushing aside Jett's complaint, Wolfe learns that Jett is engaged to marry Ann Paige, and also that he had a brief fling with Rita Sorell a year earlier.

Then the two other junior members, Frank Edey and Miles Heydecker, arrive looking for information and acting like lawyers. Mrs. Sorell's promised phone call comes, and she tells Archie that Bertha Aaron must have seen her talking with Gregory Jett. Wolfe and Archie regard this information with skepticism: she seems to them devious.

Now Wolfe tells them what Aaron had to say before she was murdered – as yet, that's been disclosed only to the police and to Lamont Otis. Wolfe also states his assumption that the guilty lawyer followed Aaron to Wolfe's office, convinced her to admit him while Archie was in the plant rooms with Wolfe, and then took the opportunity to kill her.

The problem is that the three lawyers share a mutual alibi for the date and time that Aaron was murdered: they were in conference together at their office, fully a mile from the brownstone. The lawyers leave, suspicious of one another, and not happy.

When Wolfe then learns from Inspector Cramer that the timing apodictically exonerates Edey, Heydecker and Jett, he arranges for all involved to be brought to the brownstone for the traditional climax. This time, though, all but one are in the front room, listening via hidden microphone to Wolfe talk things over with the murderer.

== Cast of characters ==
- Nero Wolfe — The private investigator
- Archie Goodwin — Wolfe's assistant (and the narrator of all Wolfe stories)
- Bertha Aaron — Private secretary to the senior partner in a law firm, and murder victim
- Rita Sorell — Retired stage actress, suing her husband for divorce
- Lamont Otis — Senior member of the law firm representing Mrs. Sorell
- Frank Edey, Miles Heydecker and Gregory Jett — Other members of the firm
- Ann Paige — Associate in the firm
- Inspector Cramer and Sgt. Purley Stebbins — Representing Manhattan Homicide

== Adaptations ==
=== Nero Wolfe (A&E Network) ===
"Eeny Meeny Murder Mo" was adapted for the first season of the A&E TV series A Nero Wolfe Mystery (2001–2002). Directed by John L'Ecuyer from a teleplay by Sharon Elizabeth Doyle, the episode made its debut June 17, 2001, on A&E.

Timothy Hutton is Archie Goodwin; Maury Chaykin is Nero Wolfe. Other members of the cast (in credits order) are Bill Smitrovich (Inspector Cramer), Saul Rubinek (Lon Cohen), Colin Fox (Fritz Brenner), George Plimpton (Lamont Otis), Kari Matchett (Rita Sorell), Trent McMullen (Orrie Cather), Conrad Dunn (Saul Panzer), Robert Bockstael (Gregory Jett), R.D. Reid (Sergeant Purley Stebbins), Christine Brubaker (Bertha Aaron), Janine Theriault (Angela Paige), David Schurmann (Miles Heydecker) and Wayne Best (Frank Edey).

In addition to original music by Nero Wolfe composer Michael Small, the soundtrack includes music by Ib Glindemann (titles), (Note: Ib Glindemann, "Moonlight Promenade". Carlin Production Music, CAR 202, Big Band - Jazz - Swing (track 10).) David Cabrera and Phil McArthur (opening sequence), (Note: David Cabrera and Phil McArthur, "Zoot Suit Blues". Koka Media, KOK 2188, Back in the Swing of Things (track 7).) Luigi Boccherini, (Note: Luigi Boccherini, Minuet in A, from String Quintet in E Major, Op. 11, No. 5. KPM Music, KPM CS 7, Light Classics Volume One (track 2).) Felix Mendelssohn (Note: Felix Mendelssohn, "Spring Song," from Songs Without Words, Op. 62, No. 6. KPM Music, KPM CS 7, Light Classics Volume One (track 8).) and Jeff Taylor. (Note: Jeff Taylor, "Jungle Jive". Koka Media, KOK 2188, Back in the Swing of Things (track 6).)

In international broadcasts, the episodes "Eeny Meeny Murder Mo" and "Disguise for Murder" are linked and expanded into a 90-minute widescreen telefilm titled "Wolfe Stays In." (Note: Sky Movies (UK) summary retrieved October 4, 2007; run length of "Wolfe Stays In" is recorded as 90 minutes. Program listings for Saturday, November 6, 2004, broadcast on Sky Movies 6 records broadcast as widescreen format.) The two episodes are connected by scenes of Archie playing poker with Saul, Orrie and Lon—extensions of the Stout originals written by head writer and consulting producer Sharon Doyle.

"These poker scenes were put in for marketing reasons," executive producer Michael Jaffe told Scarlet Street magazine. "Nero Wolfe airs as a two-hour show overseas and the two episodes had to be tied together. So we looked for ways to do that. We've heard Archie talk about poker a million times. So there was nothing abnormal about seeing them play poker, except that we don't see them do it in the book."

A Nero Wolfe Mystery began to be released on Region 2 DVD in 2009, marketed in the Netherlands by Just Entertainment. The third collection (EAN 8717344739481), released in April 2010, made the 90-minute features "Wolfe Goes Out" and "Wolfe Stays In" available on home video for the first time. Until then, the linked episodes "Door to Death"/"Christmas Party" and "Eeny Meeny Murder Mo"/"Disguise for Murder" were available only in the abbreviated form sold in North America by A&E Home Video (ISBN 0-7670-8893-X). These DVD releases present the episodes in 4:3 pan and scan rather than their 16:9 aspect ratio for widescreen viewing, and are not offered in high-definition video.

=== Nero Wolfe (CBC Radio) ===
"Eeny Meeny Murder Mo" was adapted as the ninth episode of the Canadian Broadcasting Corporation's 13-part radio series Nero Wolfe (1982), starring Mavor Moore as Nero Wolfe, Don Francks as Archie Goodwin, and Cec Linder as Inspector Cramer. Written and directed by Toronto actor and producer Ron Hartmann, the hour-long adaptation aired on CBC Stereo March 13, 1982.

"Before the 2001 A&E television series, the best non-book Wolfe came via this 1982 CBC radio series, which hewed closely in style and content to Stout’s actual stories and was far superior, for instance, to the long-running American radio series from the 1940s and ’50s.," wrote Tom Nolan in Mystery Scene magazine. Of "Eeny Meeny Murder Mo", Nolan wrote, "It’s a typical Stout story: at once breezy and thoughtful, serious and semi-comic—with a full cast of plausible suspects, drawn just sharply enough to hold one’s interest for the length of the tale. Moore’s Wolfe exudes the perfect mix of ire and insight; and Franck’s Archie is both street-smart and suave. The rest of the Canadian players are equally good, and Don Gillis’s original score also strikes just the right note."

== Publication history ==
=== "Eeny Meeny Murder Mo" ===
- 1962, Ellery Queen's Mystery Magazine, March 1962
- 1962, Ellery Queen's Mystery Magazine, British edition, July 1962

=== Homicide Trinity ===
- 1962, New York: The Viking Press, April 26, 1962, hardcover

Contents include "Eeny Meeny Murder Mo", "Death of a Demon" and "Counterfeit for Murder".
Bookseller and publisher Otto Penzler describes the first edition of Homicide Trinity: "Blue cloth, front cover stamped in blind; spine printed with deep pink; rear cover blank. Issued in a mainly blue dust wrapper." In April 2006, Firsts: The Book Collector's Magazine estimated that the first edition of Homicide Trinity had a value of between $150 and $350. The estimate is for a copy in very good to fine condition in a like dustjacket.

- 1962, Toronto: Macmillan, 1962, hardcover
- 1962, New York: Viking (Mystery Guild), August 1962, hardcover (Note: The far less valuable Viking book club edition may be distinguished from the first edition in three ways: The dust jacket has "Book Club Edition" printed on the inside front flap, and the price is absent (first editions may be price clipped if they were given as gifts).; Book club editions are sometimes thinner and always taller (usually a quarter of an inch) than first editions.; Book club editions are bound in cardboard, and first editions are bound in cloth (or have at least a cloth spine).)
- 1963, London: Collins Crime Club, February 18, 1963, hardcover
- 1966, New York: Bantam #F-3118, February 1966, paperback
- 1993, New York: Bantam Crime Line ISBN 0-553-23446-3 August 1993, paperback, Rex Stout Library edition with introduction by Stephen Greenleaf
- 1997, Newport Beach, California: Books on Tape, Inc. ISBN 0-7366-4062-2 October 31, 1997, audio cassette (unabridged, read by Michael Prichard)
- 2010, New York: Bantam Crimeline ISBN 978-0-307-75599-5 July 7, 2010, e-book
