= Homicide Trinity =

1962 novella collection by Rex Stout

- First edition
- Author: Rex Stout
- Cover artist: Bill English
- Language: English
- Series: Nero Wolfe
- Genre: Detective fiction
- Publisher: Viking Press
- Publication date: April 26, 1962
- Publication place: United States
- Media type: Print (hardcover)
- Pages: 182 pp. (first edition)
- OCLC: 1087613
- Preceded by: The Final Deduction
- Followed by: Gambit

Homicide Trinity is a collection of Nero Wolfe mystery novellas by Rex Stout, published by the Viking Press in 1962. The book comprises three stories:

- "Eeny Meeny Murder Mo", first published in Ellery Queen's Mystery Magazine #220 (March 1962)
- "Death of a Demon", first serialized in three issues of The Saturday Evening Post (June 10, 17 and 24, 1961)
- "Counterfeit for Murder", first serialized as "The Counterfeiter's Knife" in three issues of The Saturday Evening Post (January 14, 21 and 28, 1961)

== Publication history ==
- 1962, New York: The Viking Press, April 26, 1962, hardcover

In his limited-edition pamphlet, Collecting Mystery Fiction #10, Rex Stout's Nero Wolfe Part II, Otto Penzler describes the first edition of Homicide Trinity: "Blue cloth, front cover stamped in blind; spine printed with deep pink; rear cover blank. Issued in a mainly blue dust wrapper."
In April 2006, Firsts: The Book Collector's Magazine estimated that the first edition of Homicide Trinity had a value of between $150 and $350. The estimate is for a copy in very good to fine condition in a like dustjacket.

- 1962, Toronto: Macmillan, 1962, hardcover
- 1962, New York: Viking (Mystery Guild), August 1962, hardcover

The far less valuable Viking book club edition may be distinguished from the first edition in three ways:

- The dust jacket has "Book Club Edition" printed on the inside front flap, and the price is absent (first editions may be price clipped if they were given as gifts).
- Book club editions are sometimes thinner and always taller (usually a quarter of an inch) than first editions.
- Book club editions are bound in cardboard, and first editions are bound in cloth (or have at least a cloth spine).

- 1963, London: Collins Crime Club, February 18, 1963, hardcover
- 1966, New York: Bantam #F-3118, February 1966, paperback
- 1993, New York: Bantam Crime Line ISBN 0-553-23446-3 August 1993, paperback, Rex Stout Library edition with introduction by Stephen Greenleaf
- 1997, Newport Beach, California: Books on Tape, Inc. ISBN 0-7366-4062-2 October 31, 1997, audio cassette (unabridged, read by Michael Prichard)
- 2010, New York: Bantam Crimeline ISBN 978-0-307-75599-5 July 7, 2010, e-book

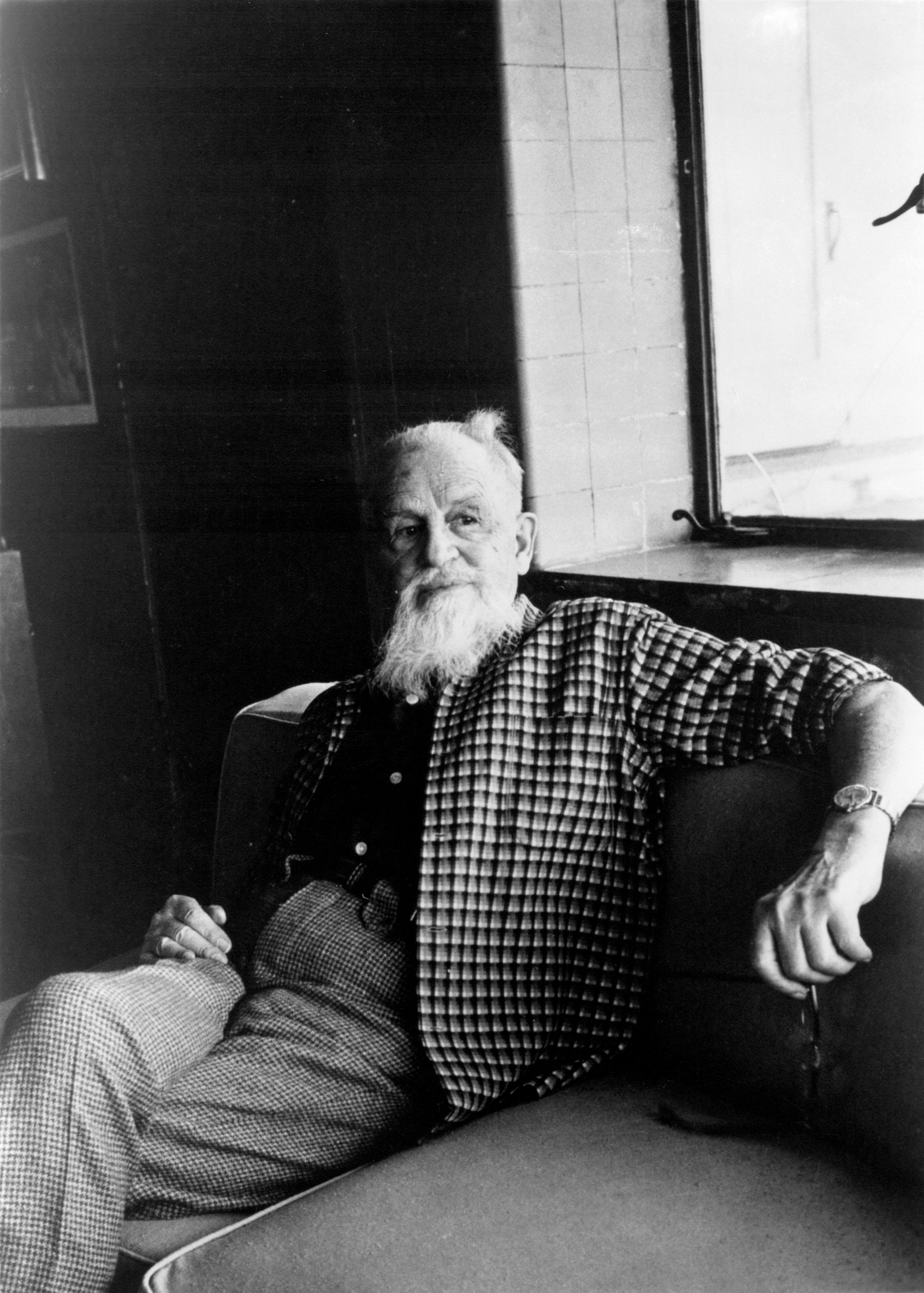
Author Rex Stout in 1973
