= Frame-Up for Murder =

Short story

- Short story by Rex Stout
- Illustrated by Austin Briggs
- Country: United States
- Language: English
- Genre: Detective fiction

Publication
- Published in: The Saturday Evening Post
- Publication type: Periodical
- Publication date: June–July 1958
- Series: Nero Wolfe

"Frame-Up for Murder" is a Nero Wolfe mystery novella by Rex Stout, serialized in three issues of The Saturday Evening Post (June 21, June 28 and July 5, 1958).

An expanded rewrite of the 1958 novella "Murder Is No Joke", "Frame-Up for Murder" did not appear in book form until the 1985 Bantam Books release, Death Times Three.

== Publication history ==
=== "Frame-Up for Murder" ===
- 1958, The Saturday Evening Post, June 21 + June 28 + July 5, 1958

=== Death Times Three ===
- 1985, New York: Bantam Books ISBN 0-553-25425-1 December 1985, paperback
- 1995, New York: Bantam Books ISBN 0-553-76305-9 January 2, 1995, trade paperback
- 2000, Newport Beach, California: Books on Tape, Inc. ISBN 0-7366-5638-3 September 27, 2000, audio cassette (unabridged, read by Michael Prichard)
- 2010, New York: Bantam ISBN 978-0-307-75588-9 May 5, 2010, e-book
