= Jane Haddam =

American mystery writer (1951–2019)

- Born: Orania Papazoglou; July 13, 1951; Bethel, Connecticut, U.S.
- Died: July 17, 2019 (aged 68)
- Occupation: Novelist
- Spouse: William L. DeAndrea
- Writing career
- Pen name: Nicola Andrews; Ann Paris; Orania Papazoglou; Jane Haddam
- Language: English
- Genre: Mystery
- Notable work: Gregor Demarkian series

Orania Papazoglou (July 13, 1951 - July 17, 2019), better known by her pen name Jane Haddam, was an American mystery writer.

== Biography ==
Haddam was born in Bethel, Connecticut and lived in Watertown. She was married to mystery writer William L. DeAndrea until his death in 1996. One of their two sons, Matt DeAndrea, is also a writer; the second is named Gregory DeAndrea.

== Writing ==
Papazoglou worked as a teacher at the college level and as a magazine editor. She began her fiction writing career after attending the 1981 Romantic Times Booklovers' Convention, which she was covering as a journalist. After her article about the conference was rejected, Papazoglou sat down and began to write the first Patience McKenna novel, Sweet, Savage Death. She would eventually write five McKenna novels, under her real name, between 1984 and 1990.

Between 1983 and 1988, Papazoglou wrote six romance novels. Four were published under the name Nicola Andrews for Jove's Second Chance at Love line, and two were published by Pocket Books under the name Ann Paris.

She was best known for her series of mysteries written as Jane Haddam featuring Gregor Demarkian, a former FBI agent.

== Bibliography ==
=== As Nicola Andrews ===
- Forbidden Melody (1983)
- Head Over Heels (1984)
- Reckless Desire (1984)
- Rules of the Game (1984)

=== As Ann Paris ===
- Graven Image (1987)
- Arrowheart (1988)

=== As Orania Papazoglou ===
- Sanctity (1986)
- Charisma (1993)

==== Patience McKenna Series ====
Note: The series was later republished under the name Jane Haddam

- Sweet, Savage Death (1984)
- Wicked, Loving Murder (1985)
- Death's Savage Passion (1986)
- Rich, Radiant Slaughter (1988)
- Once And Always Murder (1990)

=== As Jane Haddam ===
==== Gregor Demarkian Mysteries ====
1. Not a Creature Was Stirring (1990)
2. Precious Blood (1991)
3. Act of Darkness (1991)
4. Quoth the Raven (1991)
5. A Great Day for the Deadly (1992)
6. A Feast of Murder (1992)
7. A Stillness in Bethlehem (1993)
8. Murder Superior (1993)
9. Dear Old Dead (1994)
10. Festival of Deaths (1994)
11. Bleeding Hearts (1995)
12. Fountain of Death (1995)
13. And One to Die on (1996)
14. Baptism in Blood (1996)
15. Deadly Beloved (1997)
16. Skeleton Key (2000)
17. True Believers (2001)
18. Somebody Else's Music (2002)
19. Conspiracy Theory (2003)
20. The Headmaster's Wife (2005)
21. Hardscrabble Road (2006)
22. Glass Houses (2007)
23. Cheating at Solitaire (2008)
24. Living Witness (2009)
25. Wanting Sheila Dead (2010)
26. Flowering Judas (2011)
27. Blood in the Water (2012)
28. Hearts of Sand (2013)
29. Fighting Chance (2014)
30. One of Our Own (2020)

== Awards ==
Haddam was nominated for an Edgar Award in the "Best First Mystery Novel by an American Author" category for her novel Sweet, Savage Death in 1985. Her novel Not a Creature Was Stirring also received an Edgar nomination, this time for "Best Paperback Original"; it was also nominated for the 1991 Anthony Award in the same category.
