= Rex Stout bibliography =

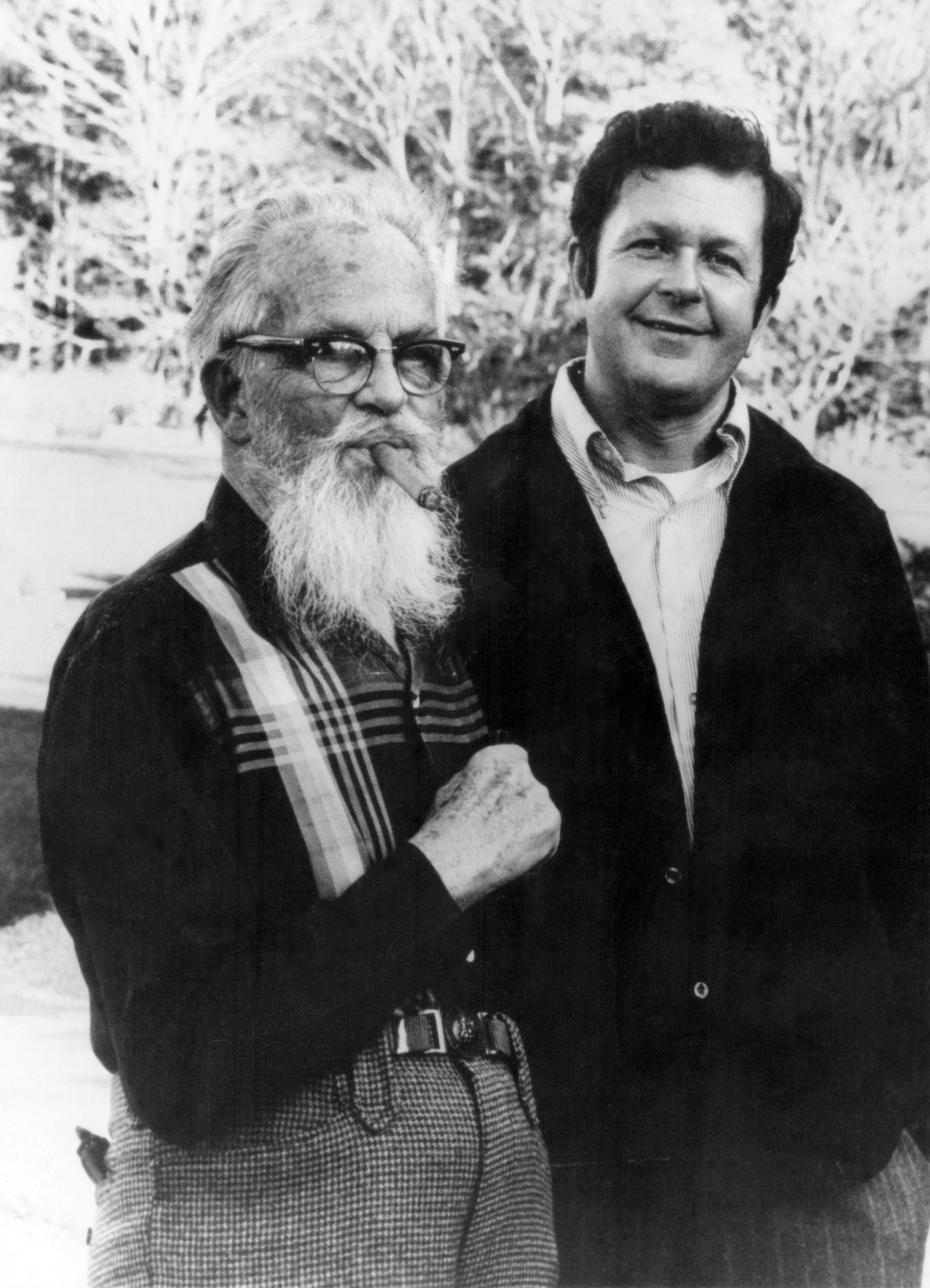
Writer Rex Stout with biographer John J. McAleer in the 1970s

This is a bibliography of fiction by and works about Rex Stout (December 1, 1886 – October 27, 1975), an American writer noted for his detective fiction. He began his literary career in the 1910s, writing more than 40 stories that appeared primarily in pulp magazines between 1912 and 1918. He then wrote no fiction for more than a decade, until the late 1920s, when he had saved enough money through his business activities to write when and what he pleased. In 1929, he wrote his first published book, How Like a God, an unusual psychological story written in the second person. He wrote a pioneering political thriller, The President Vanishes (1934), before specializing in detective fiction. His 1934 novel Fer-de-Lance introduced his best-known characters, detective Nero Wolfe and his assistant Archie Goodwin, who were featured in 33 novels and 41 novellas and short stories between 1934 and 1975. In 1959, Stout received the Mystery Writers of America's Grand Master Award. The Nero Wolfe corpus was nominated as Best Mystery Series of the Century at Bouchercon XXXI, the world's largest mystery convention, and Rex Stout was nominated as Best Mystery Writer of the Century.

In addition to writing fiction, Stout was a prominent public intellectual for decades. He was active in the early years of the American Civil Liberties Union and a founder of the Vanguard Press. Stout served as head of the Writers' War Board during World War II, became a radio celebrity through his numerous broadcasts, and was later active in promoting World Federalism. He was the longtime president of the Authors Guild and served a term as president of the Mystery Writers of America.

== Nero Wolfe corpus ==
=== Nero Wolfe books ===
Rex Stout's Nero Wolfe books (novels and collections of novellas and short stories) are listed in order of publication. For specific publication history, including original magazine appearances, see entries for individual titles. Years link to year-in-literature articles.

Year	Title	Publisher	Publication date	Notes
1934	Fer-de-Lance	Farrar & Rinehart	October 24, 1934	Abridged as "Point of Death" in The American Magazine (November 1934)
1935	The League of Frightened Men	Farrar & Rinehart	August 14, 1935	Serialized as "The Frightened Men" in six issues of The Saturday Evening Post (June 15 to July 20, 1935)
1936	The Rubber Band	Farrar & Rinehart	April 9, 1936	Serialized in six issues of The Saturday Evening Post (February 29 to April 4, 1936)
1937	The Red Box	Farrar & Rinehart	April 15, 1937	Serialized in five issues of The American Magazine (December 1936 to April 1937)
1938	Too Many Cooks	Farrar & Rinehart	August 17, 1938	Serialized in six issues of The American Magazine (March to August 1938)
1939	Some Buried Caesar	Farrar & Rinehart	February 2, 1939	Abridged as "The Red Bull" in The American Magazine (December 1938)
1940	Over My Dead Body	Farrar & Rinehart	January 3, 1940	Abridged in The American Magazine (September 1939)
1940	Where There's a Will	Farrar & Rinehart	June 10, 1940	Abridged as "Sisters in Trouble" in The American Magazine (May 1940)
1942	Black Orchids	Farrar & Rinehart	May 21, 1942	Contains the novellas "Black Orchids" and "Cordially Invited to Meet Death"
1944	Not Quite Dead Enough	Farrar & Rinehart	September 7, 1944	Contains the novellas "Not Quite Dead Enough" and "Booby Trap"
1946	The Silent Speaker	Viking Press	October 21, 1946	
1947	Too Many Women	Viking Press	October 20, 1947	
1948	And Be a Villain	Viking Press	September 27, 1948	British title More Deaths Than One; first novel in the Zeck Trilogy
1949	Trouble in Triplicate	Viking Press	February 11, 1949	Contains the novellas "Before I Die", "Help Wanted, Male", and "Instead of Evidence"
1949	The Second Confession	Viking Press	September 6, 1949	Second novel in the Zeck Trilogy
1950	Three Doors to Death	Viking Press	April 21, 1950	Contains the novellas "Man Alive", "Omit Flowers", and "Door to Death"
1950	In the Best Families	Viking Press	September 29, 1950	British title Even in the Best Families; third novel in the Zeck Trilogy
1951	Curtains for Three	Viking Press	February 23, 1951	Contains the novellas "The Gun with Wings", "Bullet for One", and "Disguise for Murder"
1951	Murder by the Book	Viking Press	October 12, 1951	
1952	Triple Jeopardy	Viking Press	March 21, 1952	Contains the novellas "Home to Roost", "The Cop-Killer", and "The Squirt and the Monkey"
1952	Prisoner's Base	Viking Press	October 24, 1952	British title Out Goes She
1953	The Golden Spiders	Viking Press	October 26, 1953	
1954	Three Men Out	Viking Press	March 26, 1954	Contains the novellas "Invitation to Murder", "The Zero Clue", and "This Won't Kill You"
1954	The Black Mountain	Viking Press	October 14, 1954	
1955	Before Midnight	Viking Press	October 27, 1955	
1956	Three Witnesses	Viking Press	March 10, 1956	Contains the novellas "The Next Witness", "When a Man Murders", and "Die Like a Dog"
1956	Might as Well Be Dead	Viking Press	October 26, 1956	
1957	Three for the Chair	Viking Press	May 3, 1957	Contains the novellas "A Window for Death", "Immune to Murder", and "Too Many Detectives"
1957	If Death Ever Slept	Viking Press	October 25, 1957	
1958	And Four to Go	Viking Press	February 14, 1958	British title Crime and Again; contains the novellas "Christmas Party", "Easter Parade," "Fourth of July Picnic," and "Murder Is No Joke"
1958	Champagne for One	Viking Press	November 24, 1958	
1959	Plot It Yourself	Viking Press	October 30, 1959	British title Murder in Style
1960	Three at Wolfe's Door	Viking Press	April 29, 1960	Contains the novellas "Poison à la Carte", "Method Three for Murder", and "The Rodeo Murder"
1960	Too Many Clients	Viking Press	October 28, 1960	
1961	The Final Deduction	Viking Press	October 13, 1961	
1962	Homicide Trinity	Viking Press	April 26, 1962	Contains the novellas "Eeny Meeny Murder Mo", "Death of a Demon", and "Counterfeit for Murder"
1962	Gambit	Viking Press	October 12, 1962	
1963	The Mother Hunt	Viking Press	July 18, 1963	
1964	Trio for Blunt Instruments	Viking Press	April 24, 1964	Contains the novellas "Kill Now—Pay Later", "Murder Is Corny", and "Blood Will Tell"
1964	A Right to Die	Viking Press	October 22, 1964	
1965	The Doorbell Rang	Viking Press	October 8, 1965	
1966	Death of a Doxy	Viking Press	August 19, 1966	
1968	The Father Hunt	Viking Press	May 28, 1968	
1969	Death of a Dude	Viking Press	August 20, 1969	
1973	Please Pass the Guilt	Viking Press	September 1973	
1975	A Family Affair	Viking Press	May 1975	
1985	Death Times Three	Bantam Books	December 1985	Posthumous; contains the novellas "Bitter End", "Frame-Up for Murder", and "Assault on a Brownstone"

=== Other Nero Wolfe works ===
Year	Title	Publisher	Publication date	Notes
1935	"Apologia Pro Vita Sua"	The New York Times	August 21, 1935	Stout responds in verse after a review of The League of Frightened Men states "the fact that Rex Stout was a legitimate novelist before he took up the trade of mystery monger"
1963	"Why Nero Wolfe Likes Orchids"	Life	April 19, 1963	Concluding a feature story titled "The Orchid" that was photographed by Alfred Eisenstaedt, Archie Goodwin "investigates and explains the deep satisfactions of his boss's orchid-fixation."
1966	"The Case of the Spies Who Weren't"	Ramparts	January 1966	Archie Goodwin reports that the previous evening Nero Wolfe and "Rex Stout, my literary agent" filled 27 pages in his notebook with their discussion of Invitation to an Inquest by Walter and Miriam Schneir, a recently published book regarding the case against Julius and Ethel Rosenberg that they are reviewing for Ramparts magazine
1973	The Nero Wolfe Cook Book	Viking Press	August 8, 1973	Edited by Rex Stout and the editors of the Viking Press; Recipes and pertinent quotes from the corpus illustrated by vintage New York City photographs by John Muller, Andreas Feininger and others Chapters include "Breakfast in the Old Brownstone", "Luncheon in the Dining Room", "Warm-Weather Dinners", "Cold-Weather Dinners", "Desserts", "The Perfect Dinner for the Perfect Detective", "The Relapse", "Snacks", "Guests, Male and Female", "Associates for Dinner", "Fritz Brenner", "Dishes Cooked by Others", "Rusterman's Restaurant", "Nero Wolfe Cooks", and "The Kanawha Spa Dinner"

=== Works related to Nero Wolfe ===
Year	Title	Publisher	Publication date	Notes
1937	The Hand in the Glove	Farrar & Rinehart	September 16, 1937	Murder mystery featuring Dol Bonner
1939	Double for Death	Farrar & Rinehart	October 3, 1939	First of three novels featuring detective Tecumseh Fox; serialized in seven issues of The Saturday Evening Post (August 19 to September 30, 1939)
1939	Red Threads	Farrar & Rinehart	December 1, 1939	First published in the anthology The Mystery Book; featuring Inspector Cramer
1940	Bad for Business	Farrar & Rinehart	November 28, 1940	Tecumseh Fox mystery first published in the anthology The Second Mystery Book; also rewritten as a Nero Wolfe novella, "Bitter End"
1941	The Broken Vase	Farrar & Rinehart	January 23, 1941	Tecumseh Fox mystery
1941	Alphabet Hicks	Farrar & Rinehart	December 8, 1941	Non-series mystery novel; later republished as The Sound of Murder
1955	"His Own Hand"	Manhunt	April 1955	Short story featuring Alphabet Hicks, plus Nero Wolfe recurring character Sergeant Purley Stebbins; also titled "By His Own Hand" and "Curtain Line" in anthology reprintings

== Other works ==
=== Novels ===
Year	Title	Publisher	Publication date	Notes
1913	Her Forbidden Knight	The All-Story	August–December 1913	Crime story about counterfeiting with no continuing characters, set in New York City; serialized in five issues
1914	Under the Andes	The All-Story	February 1914	A "scientific romance" and a "lost race" fantasy novel
1914	A Prize for Princes	All-Story [Cavalier] Weekly	May 2–30, 1914	A novel of Balkan intrigue and murder about a very dangerous woman; serialized in five parts, in All-Story Weekly and The Cavalier (May 2–9, 1914) and All-Story Cavalier Weekly (May 16–30, 1914)
1916	The Great Legend	All-Story Weekly	January 1–29, 1916	A historical novel set during the siege of Troy; serialized in five issues
1916	The Last Drive	Golfers Magazine	July–December 1916	Mystery with a murder method that foreshadows that used in Fer-de-Lance; serialized in six issues
1929	How Like a God	Vanguard Press	1929	Psychological thriller
1930	Seed on the Wind	Vanguard Press	August 21, 1930	Psychological thriller
1931	Golden Remedy	Vanguard Press	August 27, 1931	Psychological thriller
1933	Forest Fire	Farrar & Rinehart	April 13, 1933	Psychological thriller
1934	The President Vanishes	Farrar & Rinehart	September 17, 1934	Political thriller; originally published anonymously
1935	O Careless Love!	Farrar & Rinehart	November 4, 1935	Romance novel; serialized in five issues of The Saturday Evening Post (September 21 to October 19, 1935)
1938	Mr. Cinderella	Farrar & Rinehart	December 1, 1938	Romance novel; Stout's last non-mystery fiction
1939	Mountain Cat	Farrar & Rinehart	July 27, 1939	Non-series mystery novel; abridged as "Dark Revenge" in The American Magazine (June 1939); later republished as The Mountain Cat Murders

=== Short stories ===
Year	Title	Publication	Publication date	Notes
1912	"Their Lady"		Reportedly 1912; unlocated	Stout's authorized biographer John McAleer describes this as Stout's first published story (Note: "'Their Lady' may have been published in 1912," wrote biographer John J. McAleer. "No copy of it has come to light. All-Story editors twice credited Rex with its authorship, once in notations accompanying 'Warner & Wife', 27 February 1915 and again, in notations accompanying 'Justice Ends at Home', 4 December 1915. … In addition, beginning on 16 May 1914, during All-Story's serialization of A Prize for Princes, Rex was thrice credited with having written 'Their To-Day.' 'Their To-Day' probably had read 'Their Lady' in a hasty script and had been misread by a compositor." The solution to the mystery of this missing story was finally revealed by Ira Brad Matetsky in “The ‘Their Lady’ Mystery Solved” in The Gazette–The Journal of the Wolfe Pack, Fall 2018, p. 7 (“Their Lady” turns out to have been published as "Her Forbidden Knight").)
1912	"Excess Baggage"	Short Stories	October 1912	
1912	"The Infernal Feminine"	Short Stories	November 1912	
1912	"The Paisley"	Young's Magazine	November 1912	
1912	"Billy Du Mont, Reporter"	Young's Magazine	December 1912	
1912	"A Professional Recall"	The Black Cat	December 1912	
1913	"Barnacles"	Young's Magazine	January 1913	
1913	"Pamfret and Peace"	The Black Cat	January 1913	
1913	"A Companion of Fortune"	Short Stories	April 1913	
1913	"A White Precipitate"	Lippincott's Monthly Magazine	June 1913	
1913	"The Pickled Picnic"	The Black Cat	June 1913	
1913	"The Mother of Invention"	The Black Cat	August 1913	
1913	"Méthode Américaine"	The Smart Set	November 1913	
1914	"A Tyrant Abdicates"	Lippincott's Monthly Magazine	January 1914	
1914	"The Pay-Yeoman"	The All-Story	January 1914	
1914	"Secrets"	All-Story Weekly	March 7, 1914	Stout's first detective story
1914	"Rose Orchid"	All-Story Weekly	March 28, 1914	As by Evans Day
1914	"An Agacella Or"	Lippincott's Monthly Magazine	April 1914	
1914	"The Inevitable Third"	All-Story Weekly	April 25, 1914	As by Evans Day
1914	"Out of the Line"	All-Story Cavalier Weekly	June 13, 1914	
1914	"The Lie"	All-Story Cavalier Weekly	July 4, 1914	
1914	"Target Practise" [sic]	All-Story Cavalier Weekly	December 26, 1914	
1915	"If He Be Married"	All-Story Cavalier Weekly	January 16, 1915	
1915	"Baba"	All-Story Cavalier Weekly	January 30, 1915	
1915	"Warner & Wife"	All-Story Cavalier Weekly	February 27, 1915	
1915	"A Little Love Affair"	Smith's Magazine	July 1915	
1915	"Art for Art's Sake"	Smith's Magazine	August 1915	
1915	"Another Little Love Affair"	Smith's Magazine	September 1915	
1915	"Jonathan Stannard's Secret Vice"	All-Story Weekly	September 11, 1915	
1915	"Sanétomo"	All-Story Weekly	September 25, 1915	
1915	"The Strong Man"	Young's Magazine	November 1915	
1915	"Justice Ends at Home"	All-Story Weekly	December 4, 1915	
1916	"Two Kisses"	Breezy Stories	January 1916	
1916	"Ask the Egyptians"	Golfers Magazine	March 1916	
1916	"This Is My Wife"	Snappy Stories	March 1916	
1916	"Second Edition"	Young's Magazine	April 1916	
1916	"It's Science That Counts"	All-Story Weekly	April 1, 1916	
1916	"The Rope Dance"	All-Story Weekly	June 24, 1916	
1917	"It Happened Last Night"	The Black Cat	January 1917	
1917	"An Officer and a Lady"	All-Story Weekly	January 13, 1917	
1917	"Heels of Fate"	All-Story Weekly	November 17, 1917	
1918	"Old Fools and Young"	Young's Magazine	April 1918	
1936	"A Good Character for a Novel"	The New Masses	December 15, 1936	
1953	"Tough Cop's Gift"	What's New: Abbott Laboratories Christmas Annual	1953	Also titled "Santa Claus Beat," "Cop's Gift," "Christmas Beat," and "Nobody Deserved Justice" in magazine and anthology reprintings

=== Edited volumes ===
Year	Title	Publisher	Publication date	Notes
1942	The Illustrious Dunderheads	Alfred A. Knopf	September 21, 1942	A collection of isolationist, anti-WWII and pro-Nazi statements and votes by sitting Members of Congress
1946	Rue Morgue No. 1	Creative Age Press	1946	Anthology of 19 stories chosen by Louis Greenfield
1956	Eat, Drink and Be Buried	Viking Press	1956	Mystery Writers of America anthology; British edition titled For Tomorrow We Die (1958) omitted three stories

=== Poetry ===
Year	Title	Publisher	Publication date	Notes
1910	"In Cupid's Family"	The Smart Set	November 1910	
1911	"Cupid's Revenge"	Pensacola Journal	18 May 1911	
1911	"The Victory of Love"	The Smart Set	October 1911	
1935	"On My Bashfulness (With No Apologies to Milton)"	Farrar & Rinehart	1935	Included in The Bedroom Companion, a humorous collection of risque stories, cartoons, essays, ditties, short plays and poems contributed by authors including Ogden Nash, Marc Connelly, Philip Wylie and Mark Hellinger

== Books about Rex Stout and Nero Wolfe ==
- Anderson, David R., Rex Stout (1984, Frederick Ungar; Hardcover ISBN 0-8044-2005-X / Paperback ISBN 0-8044-6009-4). Study of the Nero Wolfe series.
- Baring-Gould, William S., Nero Wolfe of West Thirty-fifth Street (1969, Viking Press; ISBN 0-14-006194-0). Fanciful biography. Reviewed in Time, March 21, 1969
- Bourne, Michael, Corsage: A Bouquet of Rex Stout and Nero Wolfe (1977, James A. Rock & Co, Publishers; Hardcover ISBN 0-918736-00-5 / Paperback ISBN 0-918736-01-3). Posthumous collection produced in a numbered limited edition of 276 hardcovers and 1,500 softcovers. Shortly before his death Rex Stout authorized the editor to include the first Nero Wolfe novella, "Bitter End" (1940), which had not been republished in his own novella collections. Corsage also includes an interview Bourne conducted with Stout (July 18, 1973; also available on audiocassette tape), and concludes with the only book publication of "Why Nero Wolfe Likes Orchids," an article by Rex Stout that first appeared in Life (April 19, 1963).
- Darby, Ken, The Brownstone House of Nero Wolfe (1983, Little, Brown and Company; ISBN 0-316-17280-4). Biography of the brownstone "as told by Archie Goodwin." Includes detailed floor plans.
- Gotwald, Rev. Frederick G., The Nero Wolfe Handbook (1985; revised 1992, 2000). Self-published anthology of essays edited by a longtime member of The Wolfe Pack.
- Kaye, Marvin, The Archie Goodwin Files (2005, Wildside Press; ISBN 1-55742-484-5). Selected articles from The Wolfe Pack publication The Gazette, edited by a charter member.
- Kaye, Marvin, The Nero Wolfe Files (2005, Wildside Press; ISBN 0-8095-4494-6). Selected articles from The Wolfe Pack publication The Gazette, edited by a charter member.
- McAleer, John, Rex Stout: A Biography (1977, Little, Brown and Company; ISBN 0-316-55340-9). Foreword by P.G. Wodehouse. Winner of the Mystery Writers of America's Edgar Award for Best Critical/Biographical Work in 1978. Reissued as Rex Stout: A Majesty's Life (2002, James A. Rock & Co., Publishers; Hardcover ISBN 0-918736-43-9 / Paperback ISBN 0-918736-44-7).
- McAleer, John, Royal Decree: Conversations with Rex Stout (1983, Pontes Press, Ashton, MD). Published in a numbered limited edition of 1,000 copies.
- McBride, O.E., Stout Fellow: A Guide Through Nero Wolfe's World (2003, iUniverse; Hardcover ISBN 0-595-65716-8 / Paperback ISBN 0-595-27861-2). Pseudonymous self-published homage.
- Mitgang, Herbert, Dangerous Dossiers: Exposing the Secret War Against America's Greatest Authors (1988, Donald I. Fine, Inc.; ISBN 1-55611-077-4). Chapter 10 is titled "Seeing Red: Rex Stout."
- Symons, Julian, Great Detectives: Seven Original Investigations (1981, Abrams; ISBN 0-8109-0978-2). Illustrated by Tom Adams. "We quiz Archie Goodwin in his den and gain a clue to the ultimate fate of Nero Wolfe" in a chapter titled "In Which Archie Goodwin Remembers."
- Townsend, Guy M., Rex Stout: An Annotated Primary and Secondary Bibliography (1980, Garland Publishing; ISBN 0-8240-9479-4). Associate editors John McAleer, Judson Sapp and Arriean Schemer. Definitive publication history.
- Van Dover, J. Kenneth, At Wolfe's Door: The Nero Wolfe Novels of Rex Stout (1991, Borgo Press, Milford Series; updated edition 2003, James A. Rock & Co., Publishers; Hardcover ISBN 0-918736-51-X / Paperback ISBN 0-918736-52-8). Bibliography, reviews and essays.
