= Bad for Business =

1940 novel by Rex Stout

- Author: Rex Stout
- Language: English
- Series: Tecumseh Fox
- Genre: Detective
- Publisher: Farrar & Rinehart (U.S. 1940); Collins Crime Club (U.K. 1945)
- Publication date: November 28, 1940
- Publication place: United States
- Media type: Print; hardcover and paperback
- ISBN: 0-553-20674-5
- OCLC: 8636693
- Preceded by: Double for Death
- Followed by: The Broken Vase

Bad for Business is a mystery novel by American writer Rex Stout, featuring his detective Tecumseh Fox, first published in 1940. Private investigator Tecumseh Fox was the protagonist of three mysteries written by Stout between 1939 and 1941.

== Plot summary ==
Amy Duncan is a private investigator for the firm of Bonner and Raffray (see The Hand in the Glove for more complete information about Dol Bonner and this company) and the youngest of four women on what is called the "siren squad". Her detective work is based on the theory that most men get careless eventually around pretty women, especially those with chartreuse eyes like hers, and she's been trying to encourage a handsome young man named Leonard Cliff to get careless when she gets knocked down (harmlessly) by a car driven by private investigator Tecumseh Fox. He learns of her assignment, which is to investigate the possibility the company of which Cliff is a vice-president, a large food conglomerate, has been putting quinine into jars of food sold by her uncle's company, Tingley's Tidbits; someone certainly has, and it's bad for business.

After a further series of coincidences involving her boss, Cliff, and Fox, she is fired and goes to visit her uncle after working hours—she finds him murdered in his office and is promptly knocked unconscious without seeing her assailant. Fox and the police both investigate the company, including its sales manager Sol Fry and production manager G. (for Gwendolyn) Yates, but reserve their suspicions for Tingley's son Phil, who has crackpot ideas about reforming the economic system, and Guthrie Judd, who owns the food conglomerate. Since the quinine problems began, Mr. Tingley has been taking samples from the production line, and the latest sample jar is missing, but so are some documents that relate to the personal lives of Phil Tingley and Guthrie Judd. Fox tracks down the documents and learns Judd's secret, but it brings him no closer to the identity of the murderer. The only thing that does so is remembering a chance remark made by one of the suspects that leads directly to the missing sample jar and the guilty party.

== Literary significance and criticism ==
- Jacques Barzun and Wendell Hertig Taylor, A Catalogue of Crime — A Tecumseh Fox story, in which all the elements of the later Wolfe tales are as it were held in solution: the attitude toward people and the use of reason, the holding of conferences, the description of places and characters, and the pace of storytelling (though here we have a bit of a plateau). Fox helps a girl (assistant to the operative Dol Bonner) exculpate herself when her uncle is murdered. ... A good job.

== Publication history ==
Bad for Business first appeared in the 1940 anthology, The Second Mystery Book

- 1940, The Second Mystery Book, an anthology. New York: Farrar & Rinehart, November 28, 1940, hardcover
- no date, Chicago: Century, abridged
- 1945, London: Collins Crime Club, July 12, 1945, hardcover
- 1949, New York: Dell #299 (mapback by Gerald Gregg), April 1949
- 1965, New York: Pyramid (Green Door) #R-1166, April 1965; second printing #R1785, April 1968; third printing #R-1785, September 1968; fourth printing #N-2923
- 1973, London: Hamish Hamilton (A Fingerprint Book), 1973

=== "Bitter End" ===
Rex Stout's publisher Farrar & Rinehart scheduled Bad for Business for November 1940 release. Like many of Stout's stories, the book was offered to The American Magazine for advance publication in abridged form.

"To Stout's surprise," wrote biographer John McAleer, "Sumner Blossom, publisher of The American Magazine, refused to pursue the Fox piece but offered Stout double payment if he would convert the story into a Wolfe novella. To Blossom's surprise, and maybe his own, Rex effected the transformation in eleven days. As he explained to me later, by then he had already become deeply committed to the war against Hitler and needed the money."

"Bitter End" was the first Nero Wolfe novella, published in the November 1940 issue of The American Magazine. The story was first published in book form in the posthumous limited-edition collection Corsage: A Bouquet of Rex Stout and Nero Wolfe edited by Michael Bourne, published in 1977 by James A. Rock & Co., Publishers. "Bitter End" was later published by Bantam Books in the collection Death Times Three (1985).
