= Mountain lion (disambiguation) =

A mountain lion, or cougar, is a large cat native to the Americas.

Mountain lion may also refer to:

== Sports ==
- Sacramento Mountain Lions, a team in the United Football League
- Sullivan Mountain Lions, a minor league baseball team
- Concord Mountain Lions, the teams of Concord University, in West Virginia
- UCCS Mountain Lions, the teams of the University of Colorado Colorado Springs
- Young Harris Mountain Lions, the teams of Young Harris College, in Georgia

== Other uses ==
- The Mountain Lion, a 1947 novel by Jean Stafford
- The Mountain Lion, a 1969 novel by Robert William Murphy, basis for the 1972 Disney film Run, Cougar, Run
- OS X Mountain Lion, a computer operating system

== See also ==
- Mountain cat (disambiguation)
