= Aristology =

Aristology is the art or science of cooking and dining. It encompasses the preparation, combination, and presentation of dishes and the manner in which these dishes are integrated into a meal.

An Aristologist is someone who studies or takes part in the art or science of cooking and eating (dining) with particular interests and skills in the preparation, combination and presentation of food dishes, wines, spirits, flavours and tastes - coupled with tasteful and correct presentation of all the courses and components of a meal.

The term has been largely superseded by "gourmet", which is also the older word, borrowed into English in 1820.

An Aristologist is likely to place great importance on the experience, skill, and artistic integrity of the chef, and disdain the use of cookbooks, ready-made ingredients, and other conveniences.

" The Aristologist took a keen interest in the menu, and thought very hard about what red wine he was going to choose to go with his sirloin steak."

== Literary record ==
The word is derived from the Greek άριστον (ariston), meaning "breakfast" or "lunch", and the suffix -logy, connoting a systematic discipline. Its earliest attestation in the Oxford English Dictionary dates from 1835.

Edward Abbot, the author of the first Australian cookbook (The English And Australian Cookery Book — Cookery For The Many, published 1864), described himself as "an Australian Aristologist".

The term has also been used in the mystery novels of American author Rex Stout, whose corpulent protagonist, Nero Wolfe, has a couple of encounters with a society known as the Ten for Aristology, who in his eyes are "... witlings, as dining is an art and not a science". Wolfe's first encounter with the society occurs in the novella "Poison à la Carte", one of three stories found in the book Three at Wolfe's Door.

== See also ==
- Fooding
- Gastronomy
