= Alphabet Hicks =

1941 mystery novel by Rex Stout

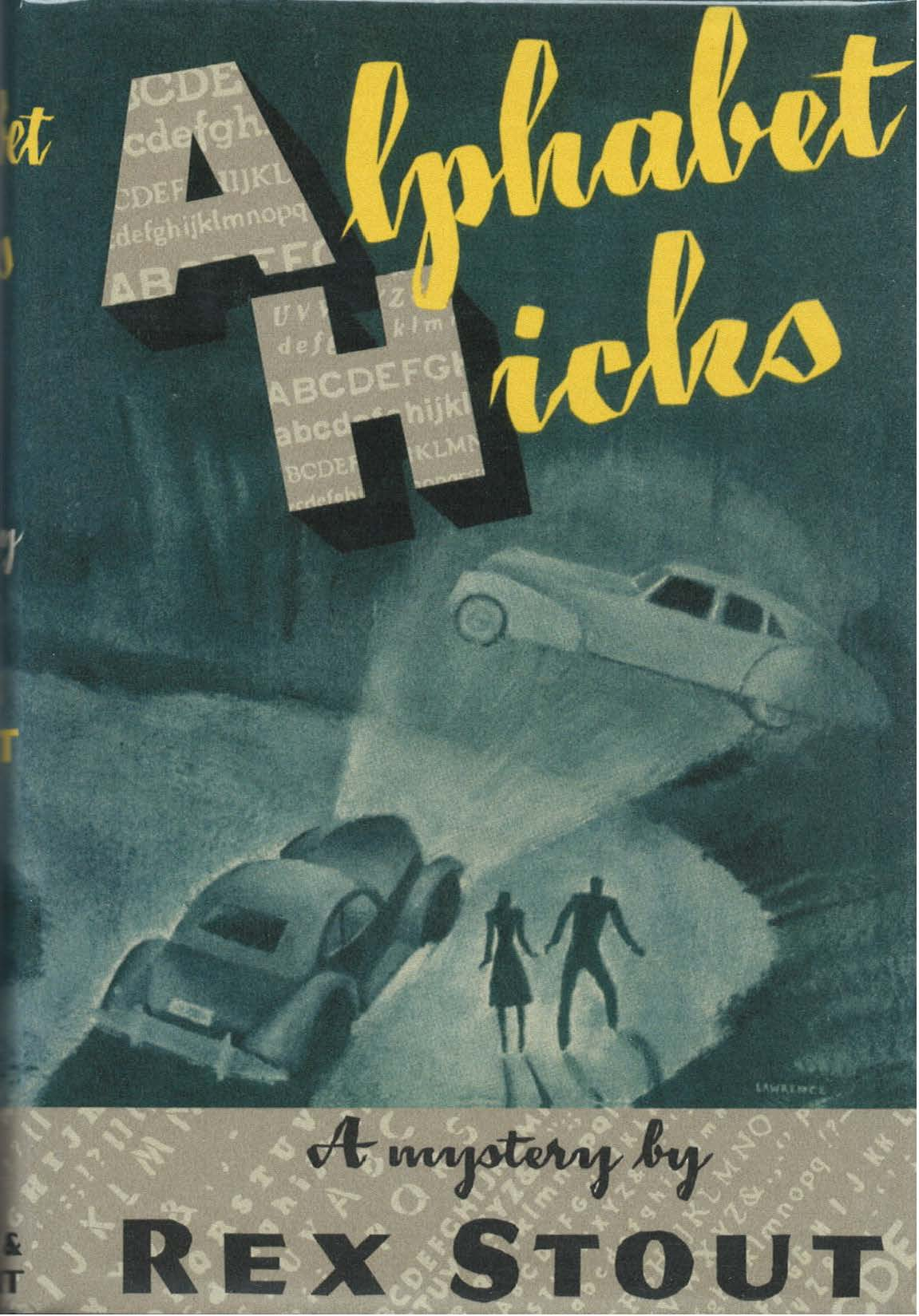
- Author: Rex Stout
- Language: English
- Series: Alphabet Hicks
- Genre: Detective
- Publisher: Farrar & Rinehart (U.S. 1941)
- Publication date: December 8, 1941
- Publication place: United States
- Media type: Print; hardcover and paperback
- Preceded by: The Broken Vase
- Followed by: The Silent Speaker

Alphabet Hicks is a mystery novel by American writer Rex Stout, starring his detective, Alphabet Hicks, first published in 1941. Private investigator Alphabet Hicks was the protagonist of one novel and one short story written by Stout.

== Plot summary ==
Another Stout detective comes on stage, a brilliant Harvard Law School graduate, now a disbarred lawyer, the energetic, brusque Alfred ("Alphabet") Hicks seems content to function as a cab driver until a woman passenger is plunged into difficulties. He then turns investigator and soon is up to his earlobes in intrigues within the plastics industry, and killings that are part and parcel of those intrigues. Hicks is encountered just once again - in Stout's short story "His Own Hand".

== Literary significance and criticism ==
- Isaac Anderson, The New York Times Book Review — Rex Stout, turning temporarily from the slow-moving, subtle-minded mystery novel character, Nero Wolfe, has invented one called Alphabet Hicks, who is described as Wolfe's opposite, being a dynamo and somewhat impish. Farrar & Rinehart will introduce the new character in a book next Fall.
- Isaac Anderson, The New York Times Book Review — His card reads: A. Hicks. M.S.O.T.P.B.O.M. If you know what these letters mean you've been peeking. In any event, you will understand why his friends call him Alphabet Hicks. When we first meet Hicks he is driving a taxi, and his passenger is Judith Dundee, wife of R.L. Dundee, manufacturer of plastics. Judith recognizes Hicks from a description of him that was printed after he had solved the case of the girl with the clothespins on her fingers and toes. (We have no record of that case as yet, but perhaps Rex Stout will oblige some other time.) To continue, Judith wants Hicks to help her find out why her husband thinks that she has been selling his business secrets to a rival manufacturer. Before Hicks has much more than started his investigation a woman is murdered at the country estate of the Dundees, and the Westchester County police are in charge of the case-or think they are. Actually Hicks is at least two jumps ahead of them all the way. He puts the finishing touch on the case by breaking down an alibi which he himself has helped to establish. Alphabet Hicks has well earned the right to a place alongside Nero Wolfe and Tecumseh Fox on the staff of the Rex Stout Detective Agency.

== Publication history ==
- 1941, Alphabet Hicks. New York: Farrar & Rinehart, December 8, 1941, hardcover
- 1942, London: Collins Crime Club, 1942, hardcover
- no date, London: Collins (White Circle) #208, paperback
- 1947, New York: Dell #146 (mapback by George A. Frederiksen), paperback
- 1965, New York: Pyramid (Green Door) #R-1123, January 1965; second printing #R1371, April 1967; third printing #X1953, February 1969; fourth and fifth printing #N3083, July 1973 and February 1974, sixth and seventh printing #V4323, as "The Sound of Murder", June 1977, paperback
- 1979, New York: Jove #M-5281, November 1979 as "The Sound of Murder"
