= Mountain cat =

Mountain cat can refer to:

- Puma concolor, also called cougar or Mountain lion
- Andean mountain cat, Leopardus jacobita
- Chinese mountain cat, Felis bieti
- Iriomote mountain cat, Prionailurus bengalensis iriomotensis
- Ringtail, also called Ring-tailed cat or Miner's cat, Bassariscus astutus
- The Havana Brown domestic cat breed
- Mountain Cat, a mystery novel by Rex Stout
- Mountain Cats, a sports team from University of Pittsburgh at Johnstown
- The Wildcat (1921 film), also called The Mountain Cat, German silent comedy film
