= Bitter End (novella) =

- Short story by Rex Stout
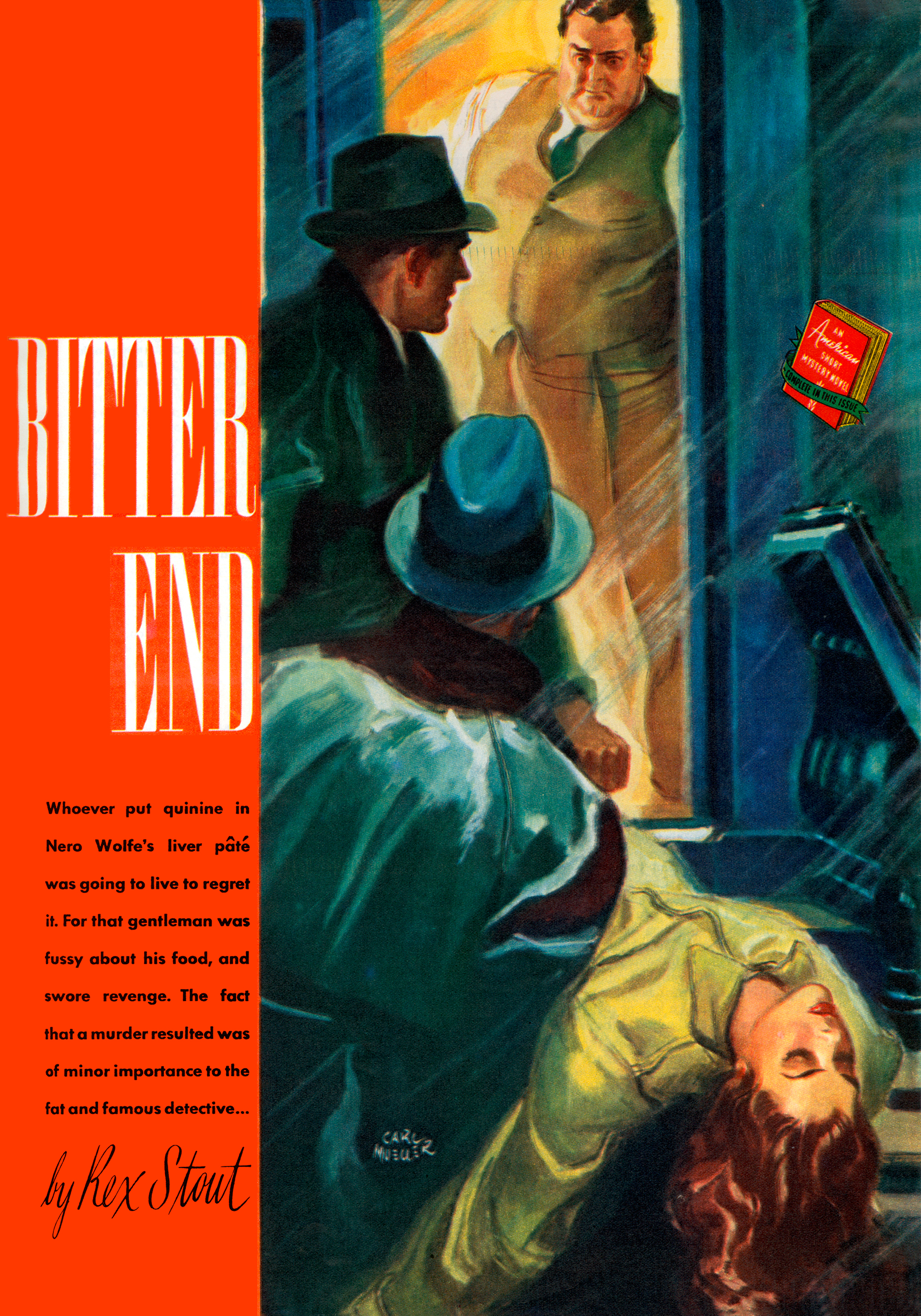
- Illustrated by Carl Mueller
- Country: United States
- Language: English
- Genre: Detective fiction

Publication
- Published in: The American Magazine
- Publication type: Periodical
- Publication date: November 1940
- Series: Nero Wolfe

"Bitter End" is the first Nero Wolfe mystery novella by Rex Stout, originally published in the November 1940 issue of The American Magazine. The story is a re-working of Stout's Tecumseh Fox story Bad for Business, published later that year.

"Bitter End" first appeared in book form in the posthumous limited-edition collection Corsage: A Bouquet of Rex Stout and Nero Wolfe edited by Michael Bourne, published in 1977 by James A. Rock & Co., Publishers. It subsequently appeared in Death Times Three, published by Bantam Books in 1985.

== Plot summary ==
The story starts with detective Nero Wolfe and his assistant, Archie Goodwin, being forced to dine on food from a delicatessen as Fritz, Wolfe's private chef and housekeeper, has been in bed for several days, ill with influenza.

A jar of liver pâté made by Tingley's Tidbits is found to have a foul taste. Poison is suspected as there are a number of people who would like to see Wolfe dead. He is outraged and vows to find the blackguard behind this assault on his palate. As fate would have it, a young woman called Amy Duncan arrives seeking to hire Wolfe. She is niece to Arthur Tingley, the owner of the company. An unknown person has been tampering with their products by contaminating some of the jars with quinine and Tingley's efforts to put a stop to it have been in vain.

As Wolfe has a personal grudge against the culprit, he resolves to track down him or her without payment, and regardless of whether or not Arthur Tingley is willing to cooperate with him. Among the close knit circle of suspects is: Miss Yates, in charge of production; Leonard Cliff, a VP of a competing firm; Philip, Mr Tingley's adopted son; Guthrie Judd, a mysterious businessman and Carrie Murphy, assistant to Miss Yates.

The investigation takes a turn for the worse when Archie Goodwin finds Arthur Tingley's body in his office and Amy Duncan at the scene, unconscious from a blow to the head. The homicide brings Wolfe's foil, Inspector Cramer, into the story. With the looting of papers at Tingley's office, the murder may not be related to the product tampering, but rather the curious birth and adoption of Philip who may be set to inherit the business.

But in the end, deductive reasoning and a careful examination of the facts presented soon turns up the guilty party.

== Cast of characters ==
- Nero Wolfe — The private investigator
- Archie Goodwin — Wolfe's assistant, and the narrator of all Wolfe stories
- At Tingley's Tidbits:
  - Arthur Tingley — The company owner
  - Gwendaline Yates — The production manager, who has been an employee of the company for many years
  - Carrie Murphy — Miss Yates' assistant
- Amy Duncan — Niece of Arthur Tingley, who formerly worked for her uncle, but is now the secretary of Leonard Cliffe
- Leonard Cliffe — Vice-president of the Provisions and Beverages Cooperation, a company seeking to buy Tingley's Tidbits.
- Philip Tingley — Arthur Tingley's adopted son, a wastrel
- Guthrie Judd — A wealthy businessman
- Martha Judd — Guthrie Judd's sister
- Inspector Cramer — The head of the New York Police Department's Homicide Division
- Doctor Vollmer – A medical doctor who is Wolfe's friend and neighbor

== Background ==
Rex Stout's publisher Farrar & Rinehart scheduled the Tecumseh Fox novel Bad for Business for November 1940 release. Like many of Stout's stories, the book was offered to The American Magazine for advance publication in abridged form.

"To Stout's surprise," wrote biographer John McAleer, "Sumner Blossom, publisher of The American Magazine, refused to pursue the Fox piece but offered Stout double payment if he would convert the story into a Wolfe novella. To Blossom's surprise, and maybe his own, Rex effected the transformation in eleven days. As he explained to me later, by then he had already become deeply committed to the war against Hitler and needed the money."

== Publication history ==
=== "Bitter End" ===
Edited by Michael Bourne, Corsage: A Bouquet of Rex Stout and Nero Wolfe (1977) contained the first book publication of "Bitter End"

- 1940, The American Magazine, November 1940
- 1977, Corsage: A Bouquet of Rex Stout and Nero Wolfe, edited by Michael Bourne, Bloomington, Indiana: James A. Rock, 1977

=== Death Times Three ===
- 1985, New York: Bantam Books ISBN 0-553-25425-1 December 1985, paperback
- 1995, New York: Bantam Books ISBN 0-553-76305-9 January 2, 1995, trade paperback
- 2000, Newport Beach, California: Books on Tape, Inc. ISBN 0-7366-5638-3 September 27, 2000, audio cassette (unabridged, read by Michael Prichard)
- 2010, New York: Bantam ISBN 978-0-307-75588-9 May 5, 2010, e-book
