= Ruth O'Neal Belew =

American illustrator

Ruth O'Neal Belew (January 21, 1898 – August 7, 1973) was an American illustrator. She created the rear cover artwork of at least 150 Dell Mapback novels between 1942–1951. Belew also served as the letterer for the Mary Worth comic strip from its inception as Apple Mary in 1935 until the early 1970s.

== Early years ==
Born in Aurelia, Iowa, Belew attended Morningside College in Sioux City, Iowa, but did not graduate. She then moved to Chicago, where she worked for a time as a ballet dancer with the Chicago Civic Opera Company before becoming a freelance illustrator. Belew lived in Chicago for most of her life until relocating to Fort Myers, Florida, in the late 1960s.

== Mary Worth ==
Ruth Belew was the letterer for the Apple Mary comic strip, created by Martha Orr, from its inception in 1935. Allen Saunders, who had created the Steve Roper and Mike Nomad strip in 1936, was asked to take over as writer when Orr left the strip in 1939 to start a family. Saunders changed the name of the strip to Mary Worth and brought in artist Ken Ernst, but retained Belew as letterer. Saunders, who was based in Toledo, Ohio, would work with Ernst, who was based in California who would then ship the strips to Belew in Chicago for lettering.

== Dell Mapbacks ==
Dell's earliest paperbacks featured a map on the back cover depicting some element of the book, whether it was a city block, and apartment, or a cattle trail in the old west. This innovative idea has made Dell's "Mapback" books coveted among collectors. In his catalog-index of Dell paperbacks, William Lyles theorized that Ruth Belew drew nearly all of the more than 500 maps that appeared on the back of Dell paperbacks between 1942–1951, though because records of Dell's artists are scarce, he was only able to confirm that she had drawn around 150.

== Later life and death ==
Ruth Belew relocated to Fort Myers, Florida, in the late 1960s, where she continued to work on the Mary Worth daily strip. Belew died on August 7, 1973, in Fort Myers.
