= Double for Death =

1939 novel by Rex Stout

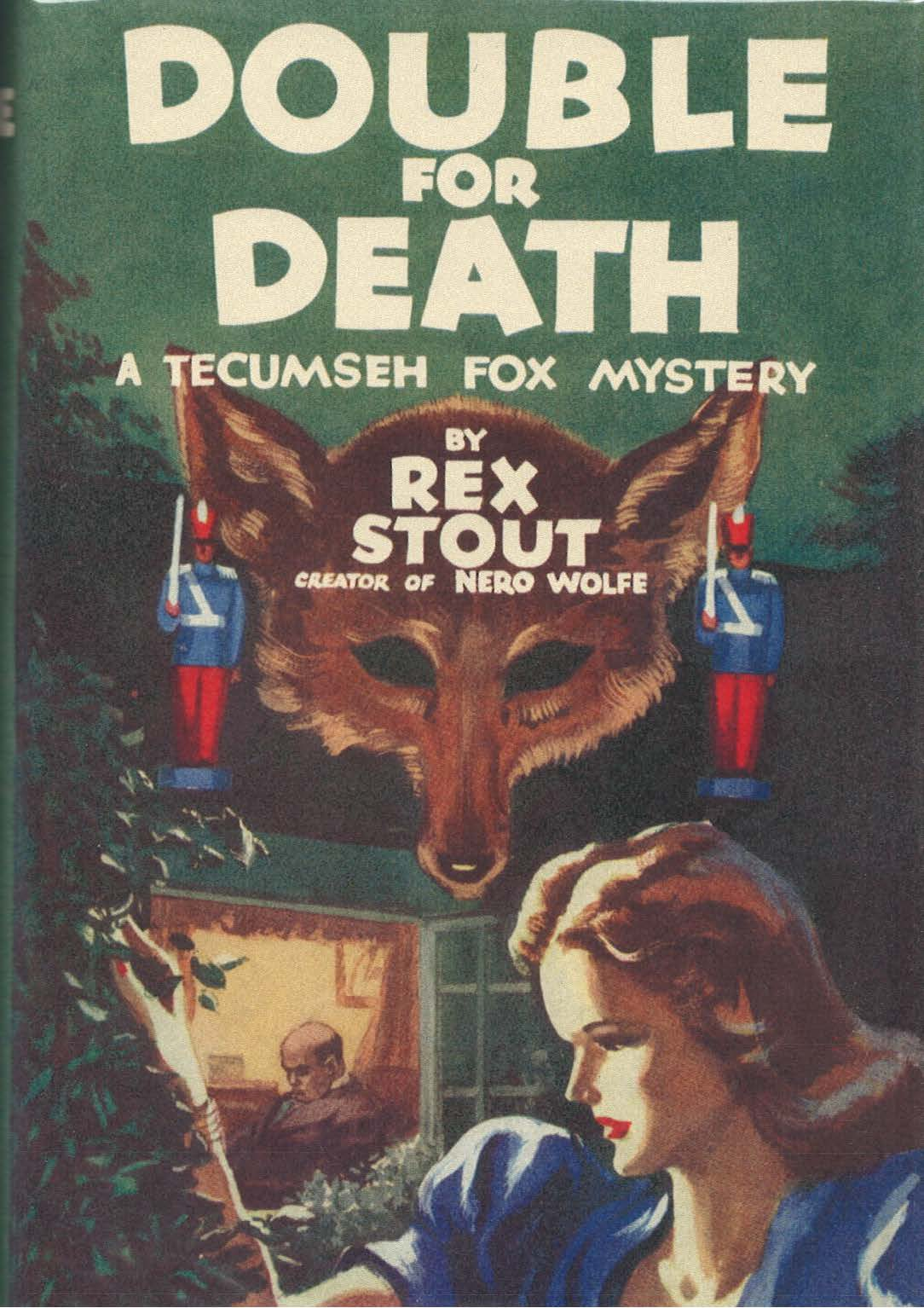
- Author: Rex Stout
- Language: English
- Series: Tecumseh Fox
- Genre: Detective
- Publisher: Farrar & Rinehart (U.S. 1939)
- Publication date: October 3, 1939
- Publication place: United States
- Media type: Print; hardcover and paperback
- Preceded by: Mountain Cat
- Followed by: Over My Dead Body

Double for Death is a mystery novel by American author Rex Stout, featuring detective Tecumseh Fox, first published in 1939. Private investigator Tecumseh Fox was the protagonist of three mysteries by Stout published between 1939 and 1941 and this was the first of the series.

== Plot summary ==
Tecumseh Fox, a detective whom Stout's associates described as much like Stout himself in his younger years, first steps before the public. Westchester County is the setting for the case, which has two dead bodies with a single identity, two lovely suspects, two lovely motives, two frenzied suitors, and two murder weapons. The cops are stumped but Fox holds the scent and the solution.

== Literary significance and criticism ==
- Anonymous, Kirkus Reviews — Few of the usual blind alleys in Tecumseh Fox' handling of the case of a murdered philanthropist, to clear a friend. Another killing, with Fox fighting back speedily and effectively. Good rapid fire entertainment.
- Kay Irvin, The New York Times — Introducing Tecumseh Fox. Rex Stout's new detective is of a species quite different from Nero Wolfe. And, frankly, we miss Archie. But the slim, polite and tirelessly energetic young sleuth of "Double for Death" is as likable as he is individual and alert ("I've never seen or heard of anything yet that I wasn't curious about"); and there's a deal of good entertainment in following him through the puzzles and events and webs-within·webs of this story. Rich old Ridley Thorpe, it appears, had a double. When Andrew Grant had tracked the millionaire to his whimsical hideout in Westchester County it wasn't surprising that he should be suspected of murder when the corpse was found in the bungalow: for one thing, Andrew had just lost his job as a copy writer on the Ridley Thorpe advertising account. But this is where Thorpe's double comes into the story; also his double life. And succeeding incidents involve Grant's beautiful and headstrong niece, Thorpe's rebellious son, somewhat cynical daughter, and impressively garrulous valet, and Tecumseh Fox's "vice president" (who always had something to suggest), as well as the swift-moving detective and a number of other characters. The story is intricate but well handled and amusing, with a bright new clue for the sharp-eyed reader to pick up.

== Publication history ==
- 1939. New York: Saturday Evening Post, August 19, 1939 through September 30, 1939, abridged version in seven issues.
- 1939. New York: Farrar & Rinehart, October 3, 1939, hardcover
- 1940, London: Collins Crime Club, July 8, 1940, hardcover
- 1941, New York: Grosset and Dunlap, hardcover
- 1943, New York: Dell #9 (mapback by George A. Frederiksen)
- 1951, New York: Dell #495 (mapback by Robert Stanley), paperback
- no date, London: Collins (White Circle) #153c, paperback
- 1964, New York: Pyramid (Green Door) #R-1025, June 1964, second printing R1372, May 1967, third printing, X1972, March 1969, fourth and fifth printing N3119, August 1973 and April 1974, paperback
