= Too Many Detectives =

- Short story by Rex Stout
- Country: United States
- Language: English
- Genre: Detective fiction

Publication
- Published in: Collier's
- Publication type: Periodical
- Publication date: September 14, 1956
- Series: Nero Wolfe

"Too Many Detectives" is a Nero Wolfe mystery novella by Rex Stout, first published September 14, 1956, in Collier's. It first appeared in book form in the short-story collection Three for the Chair, published by the Viking Press in 1957.

== Plot summary ==
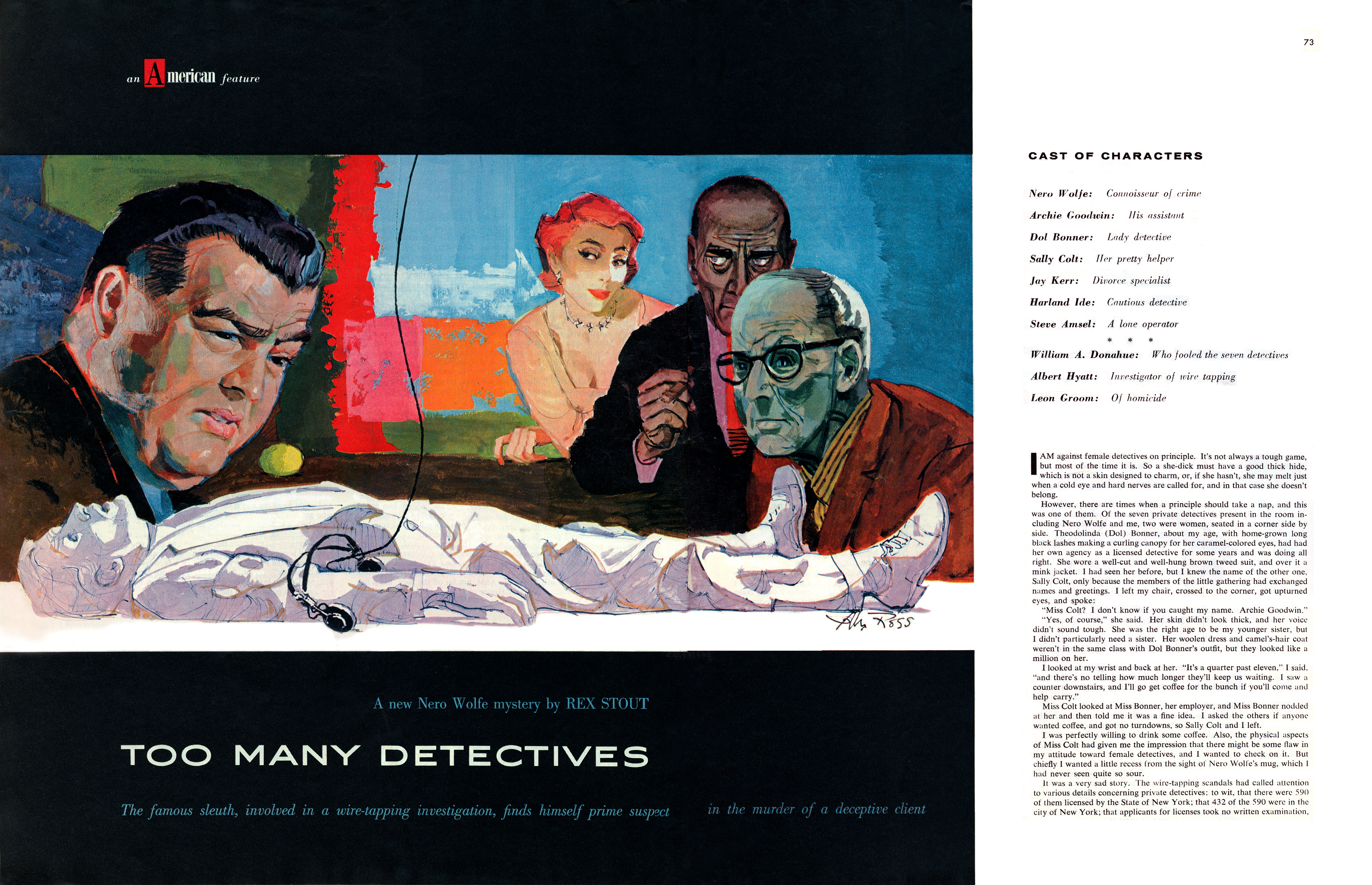
With illustrations by Alex Ross, Rex Stout's "Too Many Detectives" first appeared in Collier's for September 14, 1956 — the first of only two Nero Wolfe stories to appear in the magazine

Nero Wolfe and Archie Goodwin have been summoned to appear for questioning in Albany by the New York Secretary of State, part of an effort to investigate wiretapping activities by the state's private detectives. Dol Bonner, her assistant Sally Colt, and three other detectives from New York City have been brought in for the same day. Albert Hyatt, a deputy official, is in charge of the inquiry and calls Wolfe and Archie into his office to go over a statement Wolfe has provided. A man calling himself Otis Ross had asked Wolfe to tap his phone line and report all conversations, believing that his secretary might be leaking confidential business information. Wolfe took the job, but ended it after Archie discovered that the client was not the real Ross.

One of Hyatt's staff members finds a man strangled to death in another meeting room; Wolfe and Archie identify him as their client. The city police detain everyone at the scene for questioning, under the direction of Chief of Detectives Leon Groom. Hyatt states that the client had come to see him shortly before the day's meetings were to begin, introduced himself as William A. Donahue, and said that he wanted to give information on some illegal wiretaps he had arranged - including the one performed by Wolfe. Donahue had been sent to another room to wait until Hyatt had more time to speak with him.

Wolfe and Archie are arrested as material witnesses and held for most of the day until Wolfe arranges bail through his lawyer, Nathaniel Parker. They take a room at a nearby hotel, not being allowed to leave the city, and Archie calls the other detectives for a meeting so they can share information. Donahue had gone to all of them, giving a different name and address to each one and asking for a wiretap to be set up; from Lon Cohen, Archie learns that the targets were all members of a committee tasked with investigating the use of charity funds. Wolfe asks the detectives to mobilize as many operatives as they can and has Archie call Saul Panzer so that he can be ready to get instructions from Wolfe in the morning.

Wolfe gives Archie that morning off, but when Archie returns to the hotel after a walk, he is taken for questioning by the district attorney. After being released, he spends the afternoon at his leisure and has dinner with Sally, only to be interrupted by a call from Wolfe. They find all the other detectives gathered in the room upon their return, and Hyatt and Groom arrive soon afterward. Wolfe and Dol have been taking reports from operatives all day long and gaining information on Hyatt and Donahue. Hyatt had been hired by a profitable fundraising organization to provide legal counsel, but the formation of the committee threatened its activities. Unable to get any information from the members directly, he arranged for Donahue to set up the wiretaps. Donahue's visit to his office was a surprise, and Hyatt killed him to prevent him from exposing the truth.

Hyatt is convicted of the murder, and the other detectives invite Wolfe to a celebratory dinner; Wolfe declines, but invites them to dine at the brownstone instead. Archie realizes that Wolfe left him out of the investigation because there was nothing he could do to assist, and also because he could serve as a distraction for the district attorney so that Wolfe and Dol could go through the operatives' reports undisturbed.

== Cast of characters ==
- Nero Wolfe — The private investigator
- Archie Goodwin — Wolfe's assistant (and the narrator of all Wolfe stories)
- Steve Amsel, Theodolinda "Dol" Bonner, Harland Ide, Jay Kerr — Private investigators based in Manhattan
- Sally Colt - Dol's main operative
- Albert Hyatt — Special deputy of the New York secretary of state
- Leon Groom — Chief of detectives of the City of Albany

== Publication history ==
=== "Too Many Detectives" ===
- 1956, Collier's, September 4, 1956
- 1958, Ellery Queen's Mystery Magazine, October 1958
- 1965, Ellery Queen's Anthology, Mid-year 1965
- 1970, Ellery Queen's Mystery Jackpot, ed. by Ellery Queen, New York: Pyramid T-2207, April 1970

=== Three for the Chair ===
- 1957, New York: The Viking Press, May 3, 1957, hardcover

Contents include "A Window for Death", "Immune to Murder" and "Too Many Detectives".
In his limited-edition pamphlet, Collecting Mystery Fiction #10, Rex Stout's Nero Wolfe Part II, Otto Penzler describes the first edition of Three for the Chair: "Yellow cloth, front cover printed with black and blue lettering and design; spine printed with black lettering; rear cover blank. Issued in a mainly light orange dust wrapper."
In April 2006, Firsts: The Book Collector's Magazine estimated that the first edition of Three for the Chair had a value of between $200 and $350. The estimate is for a copy in very good to fine condition in a like dustjacket.

- 1957, Toronto: Macmillan, 1957, hardcover
- 1957, New York: Viking (Mystery Guild), August 1957, hardcover

The far less valuable Viking book club edition may be distinguished from the first edition in three ways:

- The dust jacket has "Book Club Edition" printed on the inside front flap, and the price is absent (first editions may be price clipped if they were given as gifts).
- Book club editions are sometimes thinner and always taller (usually a quarter of an inch) than first editions.
- Book club editions are bound in cardboard, and first editions are bound in cloth (or have at least a cloth spine).

- 1958, London: Collins Crime Club, April 21, 1958, hardcover
- 1958, New York: Bantam #A-1796, July 1958, paperback
- 1994, New York: Bantam Crimeline ISBN 0-553-24813-8 August 1, 1994, paperback
- 1997, Newport Beach, California: Books on Tape, Inc. ISBN 0-7366-3750-8 July 21, 1997, audio cassette (unabridged, read by Michael Prichard)
- 2010, New York: Bantam Crimeline ISBN 978-0-307-75624-4 May 26, 2010, e-book
