= The Rodeo Murder =

- Short story by Rex Stout
- Country: United States
- Language: English
- Genre: Detective fiction

Publication
- Published in: Three at Wolfe's Door
- Publisher: Viking Press
- Media type: Hardcover
- Publication date: April 29, 1960
- Series: Nero Wolfe

"The Rodeo Murder" is a Nero Wolfe mystery novella by Rex Stout, first published in April 1960 in the short-story collection Three at Wolfe's Door (Viking Press).

== Plot summary ==
"The Penthouse Murder," illustrated by Sam Bates, appeared in the January 1961 issue of Argosy magazine

A party at Lily Rowan's Park Avenue penthouse includes a roping contest between some cowboy friends, with a silver-trimmed saddle as the prize. One of the contestants is at a disadvantage when his rope is missing. When it is found wound more than a dozen times around the neck of the chief backer of the World Series Rodeo, Lily asks Nero Wolfe to sort out the murder.

== Publication history ==
=== "The Rodeo Murder" ===
- 1961, Argosy, January 1961 (as "The Penthouse Murder")
- 1968, Ellery Queen's Mystery Magazine, September 1968
- 1973, Ellery Queen's Anthology, Fall–Winter 1973

=== Three at Wolfe's Door ===
- 1960, New York: The Viking Press, April 29, 1960, hardcover

Contents include "Poison à la Carte", "Method Three for Murder" and "The Rodeo Murder"
In his limited-edition pamphlet, Collecting Mystery Fiction #10, Rex Stout's Nero Wolfe Part II, Otto Penzler describes the first edition of Three at Wolfe's Door: "Orange cloth, front cover and spine printed with dark brown. Issued in a mainly green-brown dust wrapper."
In April 2006, Firsts: The Book Collector's Magazine estimated that the first edition of Three at Wolfe's Door had a value of between $200 and $350. The estimate is for a copy in very good to fine condition in a like dustjacket.

- 1960, New York: Viking (Mystery Guild), July 1960, hardcover

The far less valuable Viking book club edition may be distinguished from the first edition in three ways:

- The dust jacket has "Book Club Edition" printed on the inside front flap, and the price is absent (first editions may be price clipped if they were given as gifts).
- Book club editions are sometimes thinner and always taller (usually a quarter of an inch) than first editions.
- Book club editions are bound in cardboard, and first editions are bound in cloth (or have at least a cloth spine).

- 1961, London: Collins Crime Club, January 20, 1961, hardcover
- 1961, New York: Bantam #A-2276, August 1961
- 1995, New York: Bantam Crime Line ISBN 0-553-23803-5 September 1995, paperback, Rex Stout Library edition with introduction by Margaret Maron
- 1997, Newport Beach, California: Books on Tape, Inc. ISBN 0-7366-4060-6 October 31, 1997, audio cassette (unabridged, read by Michael Prichard)
- 2010, New York: Bantam Crimeline ISBN 978-0-307-75622-0 June 9, 2010, e-book
