= Immune to Murder =

- Short story by Rex Stout
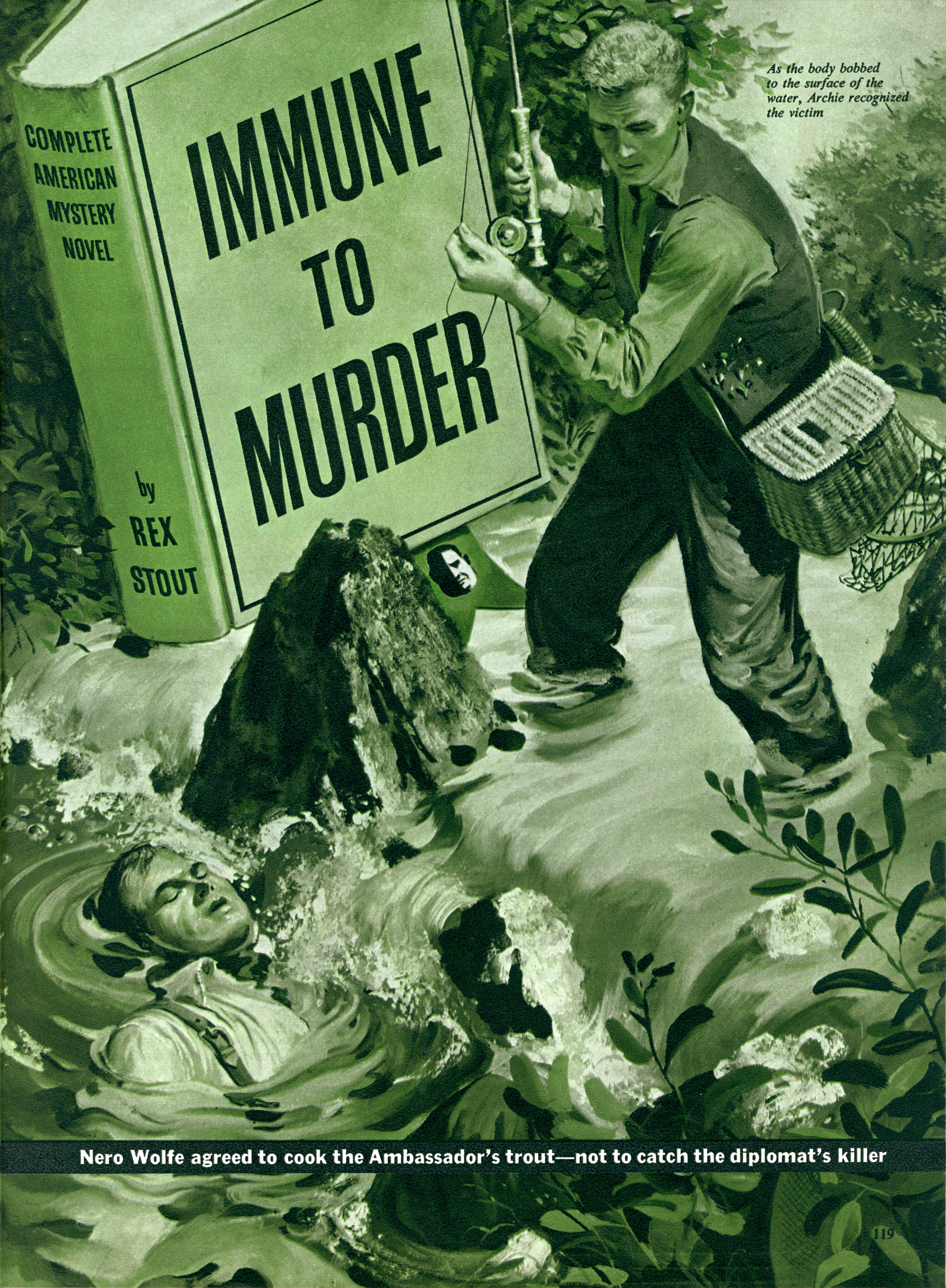
- Illustrated by Thornton Utz
- Country: United States
- Language: English
- Genre: Detective fiction

Publication
- Published in: The American Magazine
- Publication type: Periodical
- Publication date: November 1955
- Series: Nero Wolfe

"Immune to Murder" is a Nero Wolfe mystery novella by American writer Rex Stout, first published in the November 1955 issue of The American Magazine. It first appeared in book form in the short-story collection Three for the Chair, published by the Viking Press in 1957.

== Plot summary ==
"If I may," Ambassador Kelefy put in diplomatically. "I agree with Mr. Bragan and Mr. Ferris. Americans do not fight even for millions with clubs." I could have named him an American who had used a blackjack on a fellow citizen to relieve him of $2.38, but of course he wasn't an oil tycoon.

— Archie Goodwin, commenting on an ambassador's naïveté, in "Immune to Murder", chapter 4

Nero Wolfe and Archie Goodwin travel to a hunting lodge in the Adirondacks owned by oil tycoon O.V. Bragan. They have been invited at the request of Theodore Kelefy, ambassador to the United States from a foreign country with large oil reserves, so that Wolfe can cook a dish of freshly-caught trout for a meeting of dignitaries at the lodge. (Note: The dish is identified as trout Montbarry; its recipe is given in The Nero Wolfe Cookbook. However, the preliminary discussion in the Penguin Books edition hopelessly confuses material from Immune to Murder with material from the later novel Death of a Dude, which describes a "real Nero Wolfe trout deal" as a substitute for genuine trout Montbarry.) In addition to Wolfe, Archie, Bragan, and Kelefy, five others are present – Kelefy's wife Adria; his advisor Spiros Papps; Assistant Secretary of State David M. Leeson and his wife Sally; and James Arthur Ferris, head of a rival oil company who is vying with Bragan for drilling rights in Kelefy's country.

At the first night's dinner, Bragan spites Ferris by arranging for him to sit uncomfortably close to the lodge's blazing fireplace. The next morning, Bragan, Ferris, Kelefy, Papps, and Leeson set out to fish on different stretches of the river that runs through the property, in order to catch trout for lunch. After Wolfe starts to cook, Archie goes fishing on his own and finds Leeson's body, showing signs of a fatal head injury. Once lunch is finished and Wolfe begins to pack for the return trip to New York, Archie tells him of the discovery.

The state and county police detain everyone at the lodge and soon establish that Leeson was murdered, most likely with a piece of firewood. District Attorney Jasper Colvin questions the group and begins to concentrate on Wolfe and Archie, hinting that someone may have hired them to kill Leeson. Colvin questions Wolfe about the fact that he cooked none of the trout Kelefy brought in, but Wolfe refuses to answer out of irritation over Colvin's attitude.

In a private meeting, Wolfe turns down Bragan's offer to hire him to catch the murderer. They are interrupted by Ferris, who threatens to tell the state attorney general of Bragan's attempt to influence Kelefy and Papps so that the negotiations will turn in his favor. Later, Kelefy asks Wolfe what he plans to say to Colvin about the unused trout. Wolfe offers to state simply that he chose not to cook them out of caprice, and also promises to say nothing about the confrontation between Bragan and Ferris. Kelefy takes off an emerald ring and has Adria give it to Wolfe as a token of gratitude. After they leave, Wolfe and Archie examine the stone and find it to be flawed and of poor quality.

Wolfe then calls his lawyer, Nathaniel Parker, and the two converse in French to prevent anyone listening in from learning about their discussion. He then has everyone gather in the main hall and calls the Secretary of State to explain his theory of the crime. The real reason he did not cook any of Kelefy's trout was that they were not fresh; they had been caught earlier and kept in a pool of water near the river. Surmising that Kelefy had simply had an unlucky day of fishing, Wolfe said nothing to avoid embarrassing him. However, when Kelefy had Adria give him the ring, Wolfe realized that it was meant as a bribe to conceal the truth, and an insultingly cheap one at that. Wolfe deduced that Kelefy had caught a creel of trout earlier in the day to allow him time to get the firewood piece and take Leeson by surprise. From Parker, he has learned that Kelefy is protected from prosecution by diplomatic immunity, and that anyone who swears out or serves a warrant against him will be subject to a prison term.

When Wolfe starts to comment on Kelefy's choice to have Adria give him the ring, she knocks the phone away and Sally angrily confronts her. Adria had seduced Leeson while he was stationed in Kelefy's country, and Sally found out and had him recalled to the United States. When Adria encountered Leeson again at the lodge, she began to seduce him again, prompting Kelefy to kill him.

Kelefy, Adria, and Papps leave the lodge to return home, Wolfe gives the ring to Colvin, and he and Archie depart for New York. Kelefy is executed a month later – whether in response to the murder or the failed oil-rights negotiations, Archie never finds out.

== Cast of characters ==
- Nero Wolfe — Private investigator based in Manhattan
- Archie Goodwin — Wolfe's assistant (and the narrator of all Wolfe stories)
- O.V. Bragan — Oil magnate and host of a conference to negotiate oil rights
- Theodore Kelefy — Ambassador of the country offering the oil rights
- Adria Kelefy — His wife
- Spiros Papps — Kelefy's advisor
- David M. Leeson — Assistant U.S. Secretary of State
- Sally Leeson — His wife
- James Arthur Ferris — Head of an oil consortium in competition with Bragan for the oil rights
- Jasper Colvin — Local district attorney

== Publication history ==
=== "Immune to Murder" ===
- 1955, The American Magazine, November 1955
- 1957, Ellery Queen's Mystery Magazine, February 1957
- 1967, Ellery Queen's Anthology, 1967
- 1969, Ellery Queen's Murder—In Spades, ed. by Ellery Queen, New York: Pyramid T-2036, September 1969

=== Three for the Chair ===
- 1957, New York: The Viking Press, May 3, 1957, hardcover

Contents include "A Window for Death", "Immune to Murder" and "Too Many Detectives".
In his limited-edition pamphlet, Collecting Mystery Fiction #10, Rex Stout's Nero Wolfe Part II, Otto Penzler describes the first edition of Three for the Chair: "Yellow cloth, front cover printed with black and blue lettering and design; spine printed with black lettering; rear cover blank. Issued in a mainly light orange dust wrapper."
In April 2006, Firsts: The Book Collector's Magazine estimated that the first edition of Three for the Chair had a value of between $200 and $350. The estimate is for a copy in very good to fine condition in a like dustjacket.

- 1957, Toronto: Macmillan, 1957, hardcover
- 1957, New York: Viking (Mystery Guild), August 1957, hardcover

The far less valuable Viking book club edition may be distinguished from the first edition in three ways:

- The dust jacket has "Book Club Edition" printed on the inside front flap, and the price is absent (first editions may be price clipped if they were given as gifts).
- Book club editions are sometimes thinner and always taller (usually a quarter of an inch) than first editions.
- Book club editions are bound in cardboard, and first editions are bound in cloth (or have at least a cloth spine).

- 1958, London: Collins Crime Club, April 21, 1958, hardcover
- 1958, New York: Bantam #A-1796, July 1958, paperback
- 1994, New York: Bantam Crimeline ISBN 0-553-24813-8 August 1, 1994, paperback
- 1997, Newport Beach, California: Books on Tape, Inc. ISBN 0-7366-3750-8 July 21, 1997, audio cassette (unabridged, read by Michael Prichard)
- 2010, New York: Bantam Crimeline ISBN 978-0-307-75624-4 May 26, 2010, e-book

== Adaptations ==
=== Nero Wolfe (A&E Network) ===
"Immune to Murder" was adapted for the second season of the A&E TV series A Nero Wolfe Mystery (2001–2002). The episode made its debut August 18, 2002, as the last original broadcast of the series on the A&E Network. Directed by John R. Pepper, the teleplay was written by Stuart Kaminsky. Interviewed by Publishers Weekly upon being named a Grand Master by the Mystery Writers of America, Kaminsky was asked about his work on Nero Wolfe:

I ended up writing the last episode, "Immune to Murder," based on one of Rex Stout's short stories. I thought it was a terrific series, by the way. I don't know for sure why it didn't continue. I love the Nero Wolfe/Archie Goodwin novels. I just loved listening to those characters in my mind talking to each other …

Timothy Hutton is Archie Goodwin; Maury Chaykin is Nero Wolfe. Other members of the cast (in credits order) include David Schurmann (O.V. Bragan), Robert Bockstael (David Leeson), Carlo Rota (Spiros Papps), Susannah Hoffmann (Sally Leeson), Giancarlo Esposito (Ambassador Theodore Kelefy), Seymour Cassel (James Arthur Ferris), Manon von Gerkan (Adria Kelefy), George Plimpton (Cook), Richard Waugh (Capt. Jasper Colvin), Matthew Edison (Nate the Trooper) and Steve Cumyn (D.A. Herman Jasper). Kelefy's home country, not specifically stated in the original short story, is identified as the fictional "Vezenhuego" in the episode.

The soundtrack includes music by Michael Small, composer for Nero Wolfe, and Angel Villaldo.

In international broadcasts, the 45-minute A&E version of "Immune to Murder" is expanded into a 90-minute widescreen telefilm.

A Nero Wolfe Mystery is available on DVD from A&E Home Video. ISBN 0-7670-8893-X
