= Method Three for Murder =

- Short story by Rex Stout
- Country: United States
- Language: English
- Genre: Detective fiction

Publication
- Published in: The Saturday Evening Post
- Publication type: Periodical
- Publication date: January–February 1960
- Series: Nero Wolfe

"Method Three for Murder" is a Nero Wolfe mystery novella by Rex Stout, first serialized in three issues of The Saturday Evening Post (January 30–February 13, 1960). It first appeared in book form in the short-story collection Three at Wolfe's Door, published by the Viking Press in 1960.

== Plot summary ==
After discovering a body in the back seat, model Mira Holt drives the taxi she has borrowed for the evening to 918 West 35th Street. She walks up the front steps of the brownstone just as Archie Goodwin is walking down — having just told Nero Wolfe that he's quit. Mira is in a panic and offers Archie fifty dollars to help her out, and Archie gives her some methods to bluff her way through any questions. Mira uses one of these methods when questioned by Inspector Cramer, before Wolfe uncharacteristically emerges from the brownstone and orders Archie to bring Mira inside.

In Wolfe's office, Mira opens up; the body in the taxi is Phoebe Arden, a lover of Mira's estranged husband Waldo Kearns, from whom Mira has been repeatedly refused a divorce. Earlier that evening, Kearns had called Mira's friend Judith Bram, the driver of the taxi, asking for a ride. Mira, who was with Judith when the call came, formed a plan with her in which Mira would drive the taxi and pick up Kearns in order to confront him. However, when Mira arrived at Kearns' house, he never came, causing her to get out and knock on the door with no response, after which she returned to the taxi, only to discover Phoebe dead in the backseat, a kitchen knife in her chest. Besides Mira and Judith, the only other person who knew about the plan was Gilbert Irving, a Wall Street executive and mutual acquaintance of both Mira and Kearns, who had been told by Mira via telephone and attempted to dissuade her from going through with it. At that moment, Cramer and Judith arrive at the brownstone, and Cramer takes Mira in for questioning, while Judith begs Wolfe to help her.

Mira is ultimately detained as a material witness, and Archie starts investigating, first by going to question Kearns and Irving, but neither are at home. However, Kearns’ manservant Morton confirms that Kearns was not at home when Mira arrived, while Irving’s wife reveals that she and Phoebe were actually planning to go out to dinner and the theater, but Phoebe never showed up. After going to Irving’s office and finding him not there either, Archie returns to the brownstone just as Kearns arrives to confront Wolfe, as Mira has refused to see her husband or accept his offer of legal help, and Kearns wants to know what she told Wolfe on the night of the murder. When asked why he hired the taxi but wasn’t home when it got there, Kearns claims he was first going to meet Phoebe at an art studio where she wanted to purchase a painting, then return home and take the taxi to a party. However, Phoebe never arrived at the studio, and Kearns spent so long waiting for her that the taxi had already been and gone by the time he got home. The conversation is interrupted by the arrival of Irving, who punches Kearns when the latter tries to fight. Kearns abruptly departs.

Irving subsequently recounts his own movements on the night of the murder; he admits that he became worried when Mira would not abandon her idea, so he hired a separate taxi and followed her to Kearns’ house, but denies seeing Phoebe and claims everything happened exactly as Mira said. After having Archie check something with Lon Cohen, Wolfe is convinced he knows what happened, and summons everyone involved back to his office.

Once everyone has gathered, Wolfe identifies Mrs. Irving as the murderer; having eavesdropped on her husband’s phone call with Mira, she met with Phoebe and they hid across the street from Kearns’ house until Mira arrived, and when she went up to the door, they snuck up to the cab and Phoebe climbed in, under the impression they were pranking Mira, at which point Mrs. Irving stabbed her and fled. Wolfe was suspicious that the patrolmen who first reported the murder seemed to know where the taxi was located and that a body was in it, and the call to Cohen confirmed that an anonymous tip was called in. Mrs. Irving had followed Mira in her own car and made the call when the taxi stopped at the brownstone. Judith provides the motive; Irving had developed feelings for Mira, but being a gentleman, refused to act on them and betray his wife. Regardless, when Mrs. Irving found out, she became jealous and plotted the whole murder just to frame Mira and get rid of her. However, leaving the knife in the body was her undoing, as even if there are no fingerprints, the knife was clearly taken from the Irving home and will probably be missed by household staff.

Because of Mira's status as a witness in a murder trial, Kearns finally agrees to a divorce, with Archie speculating that Mira will return from Reno just in time for a wedding, but Judith claims that Irving, always the gentleman, will wait at least a year after his wife's execution before he remarries.

== Publication history ==
=== "Method Three for Murder" ===
- 1960, The Saturday Evening Post, January 30 + February 6 + February 13, 1960
- 1970, Ellery Queen's Mystery Magazine, July 1970
- 1976, Ellery Queen's Anthology, Spring–Summer 1970
- 1976, Giants of Mystery: Ellery Queen's Anthology, New York: Davis Publications, 1976, hardcover

=== Three at Wolfe's Door ===
- 1960, New York: The Viking Press, April 29, 1960, hardcover

Contents include "Poison à la Carte", "Method Three for Murder" and "The Rodeo Murder"
In his limited-edition pamphlet, Collecting Mystery Fiction #10, Rex Stout's Nero Wolfe Part II, Otto Penzler describes the first edition of Three at Wolfe's Door: "Orange cloth, front cover and spine printed with dark brown. Issued in a mainly green-brown dust wrapper."
In April 2006, Firsts: The Book Collector's Magazine estimated that the first edition of Three at Wolfe's Door had a value of between $200 and $350. The estimate is for a copy in very good to fine condition in a like dustjacket.

- 1960, New York: Viking (Mystery Guild), July 1960, hardcover

The far less valuable Viking book club edition may be distinguished from the first edition in three ways:

- The dust jacket has "Book Club Edition" printed on the inside front flap, and the price is absent (first editions may be price clipped if they were given as gifts).
- Book club editions are sometimes thinner and always taller (usually a quarter of an inch) than first editions.
- Book club editions are bound in cardboard, and first editions are bound in cloth (or have at least a cloth spine).

- 1961, London: Collins Crime Club, January 20, 1961, hardcover
- 1961, New York: Bantam #A-2276, August 1961
- 1995, New York: Bantam Crime Line ISBN 0-553-23803-5 September 1995, paperback, Rex Stout Library edition with introduction by Margaret Maron
- 1997, Newport Beach, California: Books on Tape, Inc. ISBN 0-7366-4060-6 October 31, 1997, audio cassette (unabridged, read by Michael Prichard)
- 2010, New York: Bantam Crimeline ISBN 978-0-307-75622-0 June 9, 2010, e-book
