= A Window for Death =

- Short story by Rex Stout
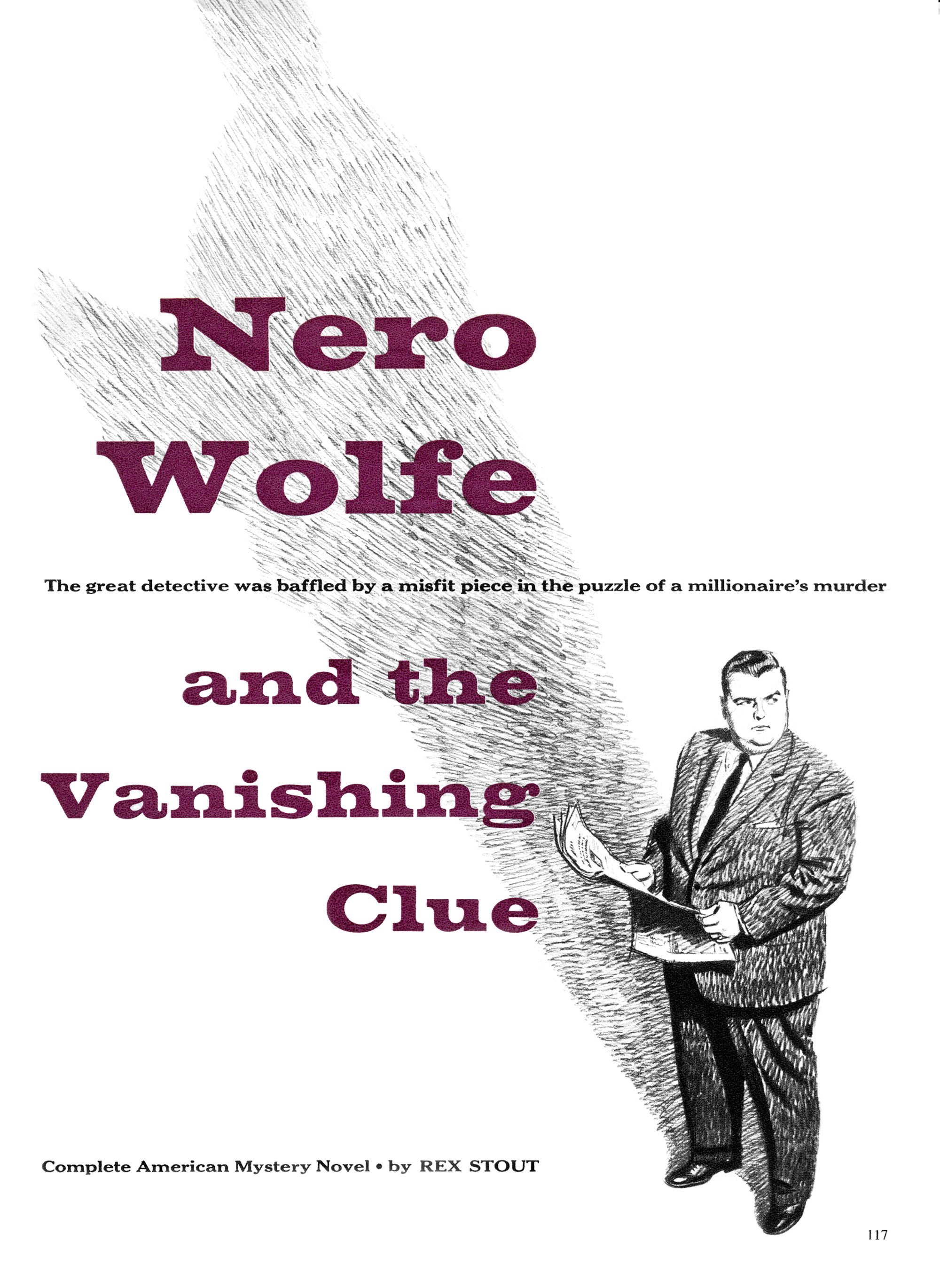
- Illustrated by Alex Ross
- Original title: Nero Wolfe and the Vanishing Clue
- Country: United States
- Language: English
- Genre: Detective fiction

Publication
- Published in: The American Magazine
- Publication type: Periodical
- Publication date: May 1956
- Series: Nero Wolfe

"A Window for Death" is a Nero Wolfe mystery novella by Rex Stout, first published as "Nero Wolfe and the Vanishing Clue" in the May 1956 issue of The American Magazine. It first appeared in book form in the short-story collection Three for the Chair, published by the Viking Press in 1957.

== Plot summary ==
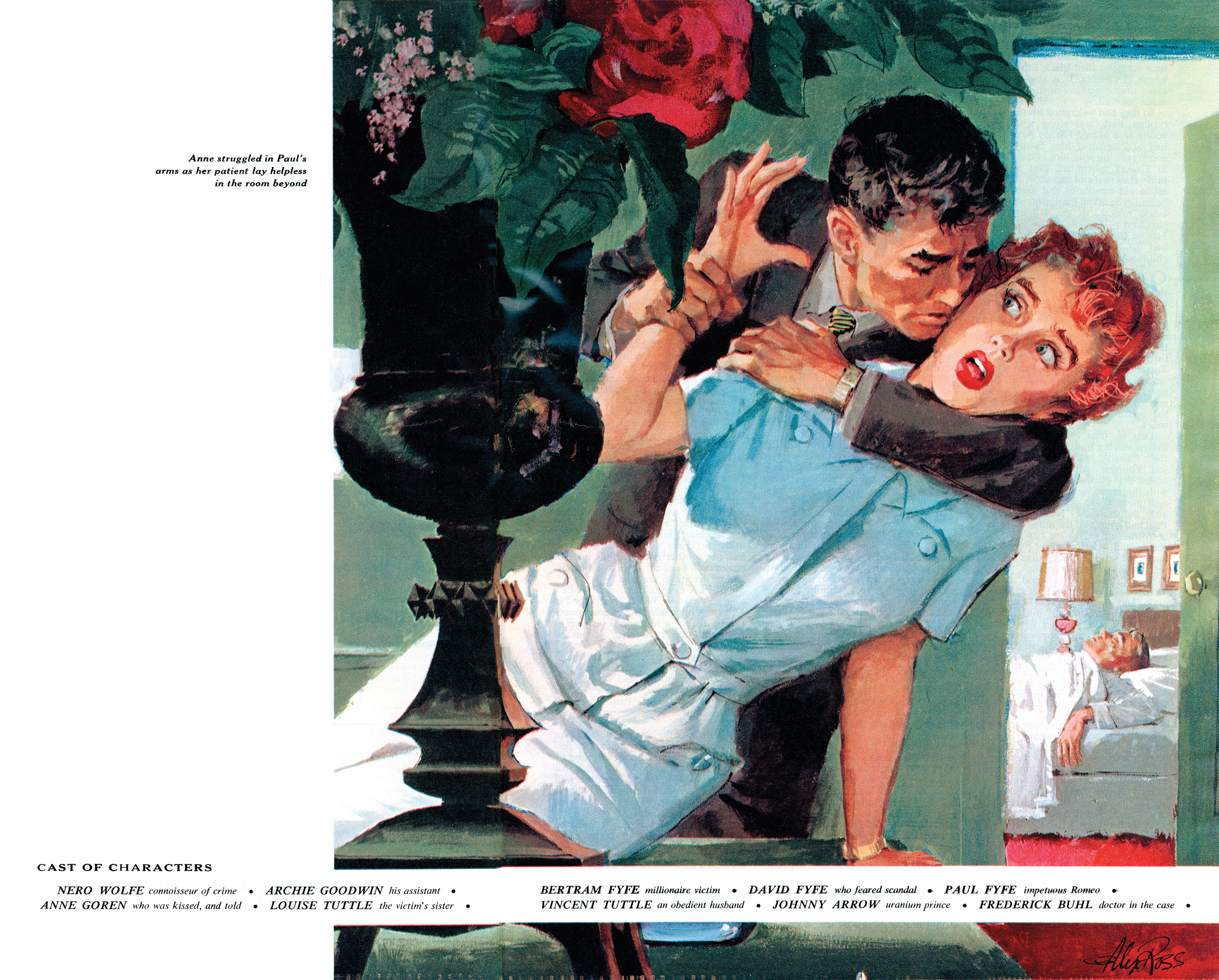
Illustrated by Alex Ross, "Nero Wolfe and the Vanishing Clue" was the last Rex Stout story to appear in The American Magazine

David R. Fyfe, a high school English teacher, asks Wolfe for advice concerning the death of his brother Bert. Twenty years earlier, Bert had left his family to pursue uranium mining opportunities in Canada. He had returned to New York and reconciled with his siblings—brothers David and Paul, sister Louise, and her husband Vincent Tuttle—in order to tell them of his success in finding a profitable site. Johnny Arrow, his Canadian business partner, accompanied Bert to New York.

Bert had invited the family to dinner and the theater, but he developed pneumonia in the days leading up to it and was confined to his apartment. Dr. Frederick Buhl, the family physician, was called in from Mount Kisco to attend him and brought his nurse, Anne Goren. Anne gave Bert a dose of morphine to help him sleep, as instructed by Buhl; the next morning, though, Bert was dead. Arrow claims to have made an agreement with Bert that grants control of the mining business and any assets derived from it to either partner if the other dies, causing the family to suspect him. Altercations between Anne and Paul, and between Paul and Arrow, only cloud the matter further.

Wolfe accepts a $1,000 retainer from David to investigate the circumstances of Bert's death and decide whether to involve the police. He focuses on the hot-water bags that had been placed in Bert's bed to keep him warm; Paul claims that they were empty when he found the body, but Anne insists that he told Louise he had emptied them himself. The incident is similar to the death of the Fyfes' father 20 years earlier, due to pneumonia worsened by a bedroom window left open during a blizzard. Bert was tried on a murder charge and acquitted, leading to his long estrangement from the family.

Archie investigates the idea that Bert may have been poisoned or given an overdose, but Buhl states that the morphine was not tampered with and Anne says that she followed his instructions exactly. Wolfe brings Saul Panzer in to help and takes interest in the matter of some ice cream that Paul had bought for a Sunday party at the family home in Mount Kisco. He had put it in the refrigerator at Bert's apartment on the night of his death, but no one can remember seeing it since then. Archie fails to learn its whereabouts, but Wolfe surprises him by asking him to bring Buhl, Arrow, the Tuttles, and the Fyfes to the office.

Wolfe informs the group that he has decided to notify the police about Bert's death and explains his theory of the crime. The ice cream Paul bought had been packed in dry ice to keep it cold; the murderer emptied the hot-water bags and placed the dry ice on top of them to lower Bert's body temperature to dangerous levels without causing frostbite burns or leaving any traces once it evaporated. Wolfe has learned that Tuttle provided an alibi for Bert during the murder trial, and that Bert had returned to New York to check into it. He had visited the landlady from whom he and Tuttle had rented rooms 20 years earlier, and Saul confirms that Tuttle has recently visited her as well. Based on David's statement that his father had refused Louise permission to marry Tuttle, Wolfe accuses Tuttle of opening the window to cause the elder Fyfe's death in revenge, then of causing Bert's death to prevent him from uncovering the truth.

Tuttle is convicted of the murder of the Fyfes' father, and Arrow sends Wolfe and Archie a large payment in gratitude for clearing his name.

== Cast of characters ==
- Nero Wolfe — The private investigator
- Archie Goodwin — Wolfe's assistant (and the narrator of all Wolfe stories)
- Bert Fyfe — A wealthy uranium prospector, now deceased
- David Fyfe, Paul Fyfe, and Louise Fyfe Tuttle — Bert's two brothers and sister
- Vincent Tuttle — Louise's husband
- Johnny Arrow — Bert Fyfe's business partner
- Anne Goren — Bert Fyfe's nurse
- Frederick Buhl, MD — Bert Fyfe's doctor

== Reviews and commentary ==
In a 1957 installment of "The Criminal Record", Saturday Review magazine's weekly column about detective literature, "A Window for Death" and the other two stories collected in Three for the Chair were pronounced the "usual smooth sailing ... Trio of Nero Wolfe yarns finds big boy still lining 'em up and mowing 'em down." Anthony Boucher called the book "one of the best of Stout's threesomes ... The situations and solutions are unusually good ones, and the stories are rich in unexpected Wolfiana."

Some 30 years later, "A Window for Death" was quoted in a New York Times feature about the significance of gastronomy in mystery stories. In addition to quoting a passage that describes how Fritz prepares one of Wolfe's favorite warm-weather meals, Brazilian Lobster Salad, the newspaper reprinted the recipe.

== Publication history ==
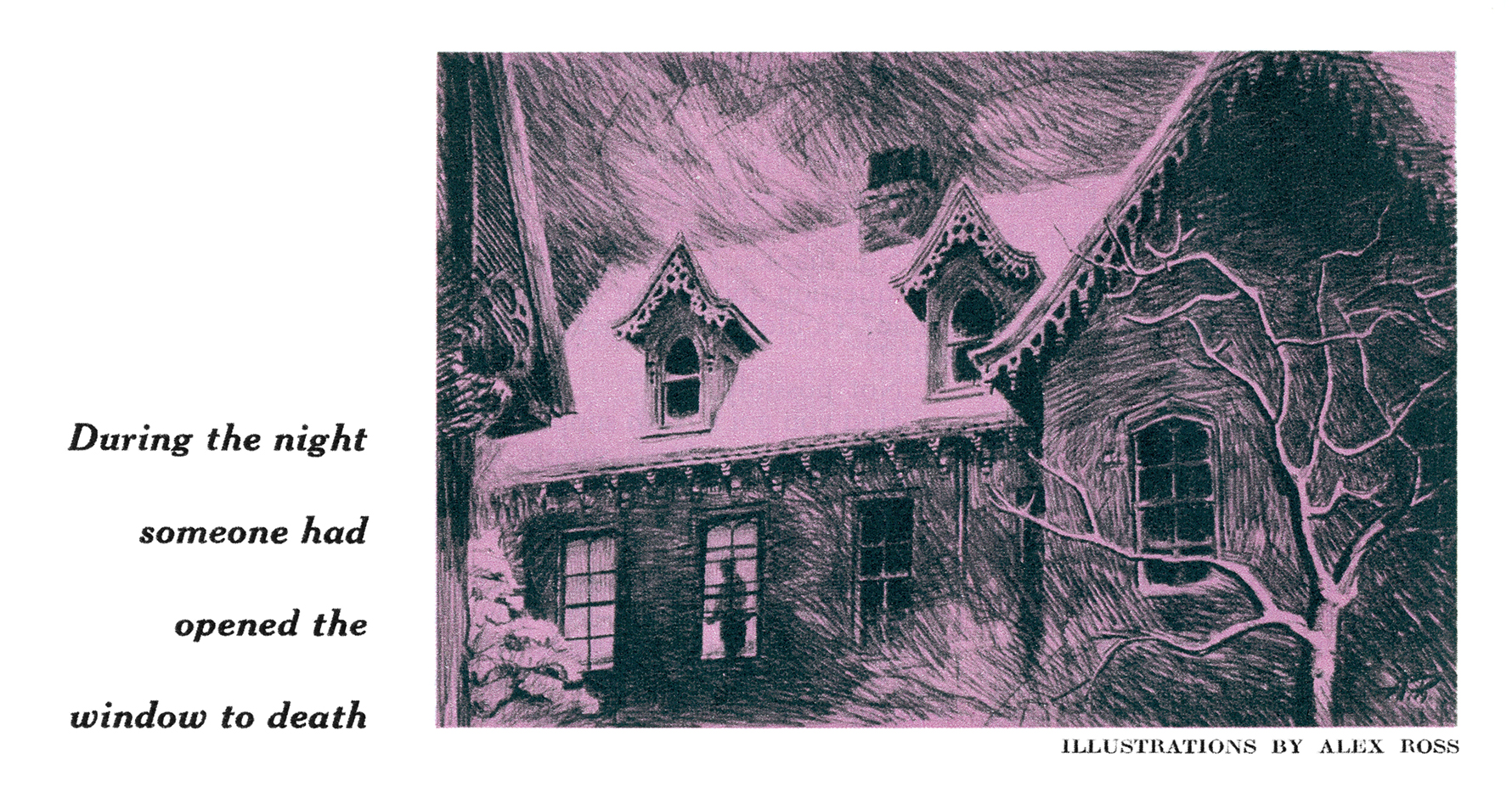

=== "A Window for Death" ===
- 1956, The American Magazine, May 1956 (as "Nero Wolfe and the Vanishing Clue")
- 1965, Favorite Sleuths, ed. by John Ernst, New York: Doubleday, 1965
- 1970, Ellery Queen's Mystery Magazine, March 1970
- 1975, Ellery Queen's Anthology, Fall–Winter 1975

=== Three for the Chair ===
- 1957, New York: The Viking Press, May 3, 1957, hardcover

Contents include "A Window for Death", "Immune to Murder" and "Too Many Detectives".
In his limited-edition pamphlet, Collecting Mystery Fiction #10, Rex Stout's Nero Wolfe Part II, Otto Penzler describes the first edition of Three for the Chair: "Yellow cloth, front cover printed with black and blue lettering and design; spine printed with black lettering; rear cover blank. Issued in a mainly light orange dust wrapper."
In April 2006, Firsts: The Book Collector's Magazine estimated that the first edition of Three for the Chair had a value of between $200 and $350. The estimate is for a copy in very good to fine condition in a like dustjacket.

- 1957, Toronto: Macmillan, 1957, hardcover
- 1957, New York: Viking (Mystery Guild), August 1957, hardcover

The far less valuable Viking book club edition may be distinguished from the first edition in three ways:

- The dust jacket has "Book Club Edition" printed on the inside front flap, and the price is absent (first editions may be price clipped if they were given as gifts).
- Book club editions are sometimes thinner and always taller (usually a quarter of an inch) than first editions.
- Book club editions are bound in cardboard, and first editions are bound in cloth (or have at least a cloth spine).

- 1958, London: Collins Crime Club, April 21, 1958, hardcover
- 1958, New York: Bantam #A-1796, July 1958, paperback
- 1994, New York: Bantam Crimeline ISBN 0-553-24813-8 August 1, 1994, paperback
- 1997, Newport Beach, California: Books on Tape, Inc. ISBN 0-7366-3750-8 July 21, 1997, audio cassette (unabridged, read by Michael Prichard)
- 2010, New York: Bantam Crimeline ISBN 978-0-307-75624-4 May 26, 2010, e-book
