= The Broken Vase =

1941 novel by Rex Stout

- First edition
- Author: Rex Stout
- Language: English
- Series: Tecumseh Fox
- Genre: Detective
- Publisher: Farrar & Rinehart
- Publication date: January 23, 1941
- Publication place: United States
- Media type: Print
- Preceded by: Bad for Business

The Broken Vase is a mystery novel by American writer Rex Stout, first published by Farrar & Rinehart in 1941, and later in paperback by Dell as mapback #115 and, subsequently, by other publishers. (Note: Not to be confused with the 1913 Selig Polyscope Company film of the same name) It is the last of Stout's three works featuring detective Tecumseh Fox.

== Plot summary ==
The novel begins with backstage performance jitters just before a musical performance at Carnegie Hall in New York to be given by a striking young violinist, Jan Tusar and his on-again-off-again girlfriend and piano accompanist, whose father has died a few months earlier in a fall from his office window. Private investigator Tecumseh Fox is by no means a follower of classical music, but has been convinced by his friend Diego Zorilla, a former violinist whose fingers were mangled in an accident, to charitably contribute to buying a valuable violin for the young performer.

Fox and his friend take their seats in the audience, but the concert does not go well, and it seems not to be the fault of either the violinist or the pianist but the magnificent violin itself. The concert limps to intermission, and the audience is so disgusted that many go home. Fox and his friend rush backstage, only to find that the young violinist has just shot himself to death in front of witnesses and the violin has vanished in the furore.

Fox is then invited to the home of Mrs. Irene Dunham Pomfret, wealthy socialite, who also contributed to the purchase of the violin. Her husband Henry is unenthiastic on the topic of music, but collects rare coins and Chinese porcelain (a rare piece of which, he mentions, has been stolen). Fox and other contributors to the violin's purchase (including gorgeous movie star Hebe Heath) have been assembled for two reasons: one is to hear Jan Tusar's suicide note and the other is to arrange the sale of the violin and the return of the money to the contributors, since the violin arrived at Mrs. Pomfret's home by parcel post that morning. Hebe Heath's publicist confesses privately to Fox that he has returned the violin and, when asked to explain why, tells him that the movie star is not only spectacularly stupid but subject to bizarre impulses—she stole the violin in an uncalculated moment for no reason at all.

Tecumseh Fox takes the violin away and examines it, then convenes another meeting at Mrs. Pomfret's penthouse apartment. He announces that the reason that the violin's tone had flattened was because someone had poured liquid varnish into it, and suggests that the person who did this is responsible for the violinist's death. The party separates into smaller groups as people discuss these developments, and Mrs. Pomfret talks it over with her son. Fox is summoned hurriedly from another room because the son has gulped down his bourbon and died of poison.

Hebe Heath promptly grabs the bottle of bourbon and throws it off the balcony, narrowly avoiding killing any passers-by in the street below. When the police ask her for the reason she produces one -- "Oh," she cried softly, "it was an ungoverned impulse!" But when it's suggested that she disposed of the bottle because she had put poison in it, her self-protective instinct outweighs her impulses -- "Put something in the bottle? Don't be a damn fool!".

Fox decides to investigate. Although it's not certain quite why the theft of Mr. Pomfret's piece of porcelain is important, he finds that someone from the same group of people must have been responsible. The case may also explain the mysterious death of the accompanist's father. He tracks the missing vase to Diego Zorilla's home, and barely dodges a poisonous trap that someone has set for the former violinist. Next he investigates the possibility that Tusar's sister Garda is somehow connected with an anonymous note implicating Nazi sympathizers in the murder, since she has no visible means of support. Finally his attention focuses on the comings and goings of a mysterious person who visits Gerda's apartment as a Mr. Fish and leaves it in the person of her veiled neighbour Mrs. Piscus. Fox works out the identity of Mrs. Piscus, calls together the suspects and reveals the solution to all the crimes.

== Literary significance and criticism ==
"Rare coins, a Wan Li vase, and a ... violin which is eventually doused with varnish do not help make this tale dramatic or amusing. A sponger on his wife takes up collecting so he can cadge money and carry on with girls. This leads to murders, which Tecumseh Fox detects in hit-and-miss fashion."

== Publication history ==
- 1941, New York: Farrar & Rinehart, January 23, 1941, hardcover
- 1941, Toronto: Oxford University Press, hardcover
- 1941, The Philadelphia Inquirer, a Gold Seal Novel, September 14, 1941
- 1942, London: Collins Crime Club, March 9, 1942, hardcover
- 1942, New York: Grosset & Dunlap, hardcover
- 1943, New York: Lawrence E. Spivak, Jonathan Press #J-9, digest paperback
- 1946, New York: Dell #115 (mapback by Gerald Gregg), May 1946, paperback
- 1953, New York: Dell #674 (mapback by Carl Bobertz), March 1953, paperback
- 1965, New York: Pyramid (Green Door) #R-1149, March 1965, paperback
