= Three for the Chair =

Book by Rex Stout

- Author: Rex Stout
- Cover artist: Bill English
- Language: English
- Series: Nero Wolfe
- Genre: Detective fiction
- Publisher: Viking Press
- Publication date: May 3, 1957
- Publication place: United States
- Media type: Print (hardcover)
- Pages: 183 pp. (first edition)
- OCLC: 36962351
- Preceded by: Might as Well Be Dead
- Followed by: If Death Ever Slept

Three for the Chair is a collection of Nero Wolfe mystery novellas by Rex Stout, published by the Viking Press in 1957, and by Bantam Books in various paperback printings beginning in 1958. The book contains three stories: it can also be considered as a fix-up novel.

- "A Window for Death", first published in The American Magazine (May 1956) as "Nero Wolfe and the Vanishing Clue"
- "Immune to Murder", first published in The American Magazine (November 1955)
- "Too Many Detectives", first published September 14, 1956, in Collier's

== Reviews and commentary ==
Stout's work sometimes occasioned conflicting viewpoints among the critics. Three for the Chair drew praise from Anthony Boucher in The New York Times and dispraise from Julian Symons in The Sunday Times (London).

== Publication history ==
- 1957, New York: The Viking Press, May 3, 1957, hardcover

In his limited-edition pamphlet, Collecting Mystery Fiction #10, Rex Stout's Nero Wolfe Part II, Otto Penzler describes the first edition of Three for the Chair: "Yellow cloth, front cover printed with black and blue lettering and design; spine printed with black lettering; rear cover blank. Issued in a mainly light orange dust wrapper."
In April 2006, Firsts: The Book Collector's Magazine estimated that the first edition of Three for the Chair had a value of between $200 and $350. The estimate is for a copy in very good to fine condition in a like dustjacket.

- 1957, Toronto: Macmillan, 1957, hardcover
- 1957, New York: Viking (Mystery Guild), August 1957, hardcover

The far less valuable Viking book club edition may be distinguished from the first edition in three ways:

- The dust jacket has "Book Club Edition" printed on the inside front flap, and the price is absent (first editions may be price clipped if they were given as gifts).
- Book club editions are sometimes thinner and always taller (usually a quarter of an inch) than first editions.
- Book club editions are bound in cardboard, and first editions are bound in cloth (or have at least a cloth spine).

- 1958, London: Collins Crime Club, April 21, 1958, hardcover
- 1958, New York: Bantam #A-1796, July 1958, paperback
- 1994, New York: Bantam Crimeline ISBN 0-553-24813-8 August 1, 1994, paperback
- 1997, Newport Beach, California: Books on Tape, Inc. ISBN 0-7366-3750-8 July 21, 1997, audio cassette (unabridged, read by Michael Prichard)
- 2010, New York: Bantam Crimeline ISBN 978-0-307-75624-4 May 26, 2010, e-book
