= The Hand in the Glove =

1937 novel by Rex Stout

- Author: Rex Stout
- Language: English
- Genre: Detective fiction
- Publisher: Farrar & Rinehart
- Publication date: September 16, 1937
- Publication place: United States
- Media type: Print (Hardcover)
- Pages: 284 pp. (first edition)

The Hand in the Glove (British title Crime on Her Hands) is a Dol Bonner mystery novel by Rex Stout. It was first published by Farrar & Rinehart, Inc., in 1937, and later in paperback by Dell as mapback #177 and, later, by other publishers. Collins Crime Club published the novel in the UK in November 1939 as Crime on Her Hands.

== Plot summary ==
Theodolinda "Dol" Bonner is half of the Bonner and Raffray Detective Agency. She claims to have been "inoculated against" men and has no use for them, even her perennial suitor, newspaperman Len Chisholm. Her business partner, Sylvia Raffray, doesn't know much about detection but is the firm's financial backer. As the story begins, Len has just been fired from his job at the instigation of Sylvia's guardian, financier P.L. Storrs, who also controls Sylvia's money for the next six months and thus insists that she withdraw her financial support of the detective agency.

Strangely, Storrs asks Dol Bonner to join a house party at his place in the country. Other family members present are Storrs' wife Cleo, who "goes in for cults", and his daughter Janet, who is plain, quiet and writes poetry. Sylvia's fiance Martin, who is a neighbor, and his friend Professor Zimmerman have joined the party, and George Ranth, of the "League of the Occidental Sakti", is Mrs. Storrs' guest and financial parasite.

Storrs' problem is that Ranth is pressuring Mrs. Storrs to let him marry Janet and thus become Storrs' heir. He hires Dol to discredit Ranth in Mrs. Storrs' eyes, and proposes that she pretend to be investigating the killing of some pheasants at Martin's estate as a cover story. Dol accepts the task and arrives at the Storrs estate, but before she gets too deeply involved in the task, she comes across the murdered body of her host and employer, who has been brutally strangled with wire and hung from a branch. She soon recognizes that in order to commit the murder, the murderer must have worn heavy gloves to avoid cutting his hands with the wire. She immediately searches the house for the gloves, dodging the police, and finds them—bizarrely, concealed inside a watermelon in the garden.

She continues to investigate Ranth but also learns more about the other guests and family members. Professor Zimmerman proposes marriage to Sylvia, regardless of the feelings of his friend Martin, and promptly becomes the second strangling victim. Dol rapidly collects enough information to identify the murderer of both men and forces a confession at gunpoint, foiling the police.

== Literary criticism and significance ==
This is a very early representation of a female private detective as a mystery novel's protagonist, although not the first. Although this was the only Dol Bonner novel that Rex Stout wrote, the character plays a supporting role in a few Nero Wolfe stories where a female detective is necessary.

== Adaptations ==
=== Lady Against the Odds (NBC) ===
Stout's 1937 novel The Hand in the Glove was adapted for an NBC TV movie titled Lady Against the Odds, which aired April 20, 1992. Crystal Bernard starred as Dol Bonner; Annabeth Gish costarred as Sylvia Raffray. Bradford May, who also directed, received an Emmy Award for outstanding individual achievement in cinematography. The telefilm was previewed by The Hollywood Reporter:

It's wonderfully scripted, well-acted and thoroughly enjoyable to watch. It features some terrific costumes, great cars, realistic backdrops and stunning photography. Unfortunately, Lady Against the Odds is constructed around a rather standard-issue plot line, and that keeps it from being quite as great as it otherwise might have been.
Fortunately, it doesn't spoil the overall fun.
It's a period drama that manages to stay in character throughout, setting its murder-mystery theme in front of a society at war circa 1943. It centers around two young "dames" trying to do their part on the home front as Los Angeles private eyes despite a wary police department and disapproving family. ... What makes this project so interesting is how it plays like such a lighthearted romp despite its serious, murderous themes. It gives a nod in dialogue and visuals to those old gumshoe films of the '40s, then has fun with itself. The ending is a bit heavy-handed given the overall nature of this project and doesn't quite fit in terms of tone, but it does add some sobriety to an otherwise high-style production.
The film holds up in large part due to the solid ensemble cast ... led by Crystal Bernard and Annabeth Gish, who deliver absolutely delightful performances as the two lady gumshoes.

== Publication history ==
- 1937, New York: Farrar & Rinehart, September 16, 1937, 284 pp.
- 1939, New York: Grosset & Dunlap, 1939, 284 pp.
- 1939, London: Collins Crime Club, December 1939, 251 pp., as Crime on Her Hands
- 1943, Cleveland, Ohio: World Publishing Company Tower Mystery #T-188, April 1943, 284 pp.
- 1947, New York: Dell (mapback by Gerald Gregg) #177, 1947, 239 pp.
- 1964, New York: Pyramid (Green Door), #R-1066, September 1964, 190 pp.
- 1972, London: Tom Stacey, 1972, 251 pp., as Crime on Her Hands
- 2011, New York: Bantam Crimeline ISBN 978-0-307-76814-8 August 17, 2011, e-book
