= Poison à la Carte =

- Short story by Rex Stout
- Country: United States
- Language: English
- Genre: Detective fiction

Publication
- Published in: Three at Wolfe's Door
- Publisher: Viking Press
- Media type: Hardcover
- Publication date: April 29, 1960
- Series: Nero Wolfe

"Poison à la Carte" is a Nero Wolfe mystery novella by Rex Stout, first published in April 1960 in the short-story collection Three at Wolfe's Door (Viking Press).

== Plot summary ==
A group of gourmets, who call themselves the Ten for Aristology, invite Wolfe's chef Fritz to cook their annual dinner. Wolfe and Archie are included by courtesy of Lewis Hewitt, who shares Wolfe’s love of orchids. Twelve young women, one per guest, serve the food — they are actresses supplied by a theatrical agency, and are termed "Hebes," after the cupbearer to the gods in the Greek pantheon (later replaced by Ganymede).

Wolfe, Archie, and Hewitt partake in the various courses alongside the other members of the Ten, including shipping magnate Benjamin Schriver (the host of the event), theater agent Vincent Pyle, actor Adrian Dart, publisher Emil Kreis, and corporate lawyer Harvey Leacraft. Towards the end of the meal, Pyle starts feeling unwell, and Schriver takes him upstairs to rest before summoning a doctor.

Wolfe immediately has Archie gather the Hebes in the kitchen, where he reveals that Pyle’s symptoms are consistent with arsenic poisoning. Wolfe has concluded that the arsenic was in the sour cream on top of the caviar served as the first course, which Pyle complained had sand in it even though no one else tasted any, which also means the poison was meant for him alone. The Hebes assigned to Pyle and the guests around him were Fern Faber, Nora Jaret, Carol Annis, Peggy Choate, Helen Iacono, and Lucy Morgan. When Wolfe questions them about their movements when the caviar was served, he learns some surprising information:

- Peggy was assigned to serve Pyle, but saw he already had some caviar, so she served Wolfe instead

- Helen, Wolfe’s assigned server, thus served her plate to Kreis

- Nora, Kreis’s server, instead served Schriver

- Carol, assigned to Schriver, wound up serving Dart

- Lucy, who was originally supposed to serve Dart, ultimately served Hewitt

- Fern, who was meant to serve Hewitt, was busy fixing her hair in the bathroom and came out too late to serve anyone

This last piece eliminates Fern as the killer, and Wolfe deduces that the killer must have taken two plates of caviar, poisoning one and giving it to Pyle, then going back for another. He tries to determine in what order the plates were served but is unsuccessful; while a seventh Hebe, Marjorie Quinn, admits to having taken the first plate, no one in the kitchen can identify the Hebes who came after her, nor the order they were in when they took the plates. What’s more, none of the other members of the Ten can remember anything about the woman who actually served Pyle. Schriver then returns with Purley Stebbins and reveals that Pyle has died.

The next afternoon, Inspector Cramer visit’s Wolfe’s brownstone to confront him for interrogating the Hebes before the investigation even started. Wolfe is adamant one of the five Hebes who served the small group including him and Pyle is the killer; Pyle could have known at least one of the women through his line of work and any of them could have a motive for killing him. During the conversation, Helen arrives at the brownstone and waits in the front room until Cramer departs. She reveals to Wolfe that Pyle backed failing plays to seduce the actresses, before confessing to being one of those girls, which led to her stabbing Pyle three months earlier when he tried to force himself on her. In exchange for keeping her secret, Helen wants to help Wolfe via talking to the four remaining suspects to determine if any of them had a motive to want Pyle dead. Wolfe vetoes Helen acting alone and insists Archie accompany her. The meeting takes place at Peggy and Nora's shared apartment, where the women speculate whether or not someone might have accidentally taken two plates. Archie disproves this theory using a paper diagram, before requesting all five women come to Wolfe's office the following day. The girls insist on going right at that moment, when Stebbins, hiding in the next room after being summoned by Nora, emerges and attempts to arrest Archie for obstructing justice, but Archie makes him change his mind en route to headquarters.

Now ready to expose the killer, Wolfe puts his plan into motion; he has Zoltan contact all five women separately, saying he saw that woman take two plates from the kitchen, and arranges to meet with each of them at a different time at John Piotti's restaurant. Zoltan is seated at a table with a hidden microphone, with Archie and Stebbins listening in the kitchen, Wolfe and Cramer in Wolfe's office, and two undercover detectives watching across the room as Zoltan's scheduled companion joins him.

The murderer is Carol, whom Pyle had promised to marry but broke his word. She confesses to Zoltan after he sympathizes with her plight. Carol then asks Zoltan to fetch her purse from her car to distract him, then attempts to poison his spaghetti, only to be witnessed and arrested by the undercover detectives. Wolfe has Carol brought to his office to confront her for hurting Fritz, Zoltan, and Felix, as well as himself by extension. However, before Cramer takes Carol away, Fritz tells her he forgives her, only for her to call him a liar.

== Devices use in other novels ==
Plot devices used in "Poison à la Carte" appear in other Wolfe stories. For example, the list of possible murderers (here, the Hebes) gaining access to the victim one by one recalls Too Many Cooks, "Fourth of July Picnic" and The Silent Speaker. Then the murderer is trapped into making incriminating statements at John Piotti's restaurant, a location used for an identical purpose in Gambit. And Fritz cooks dinner for the Aristologists on another occasion, in The Doorbell Rang, an experience that leaves him considerably more chagrined than does the one described here.

== The unfamiliar word ==
"Like all of us, Wolfe has his favorite words, phrases, and sayings," wrote William S. Baring-Gould. "Among the words, many are unusual and some are abstruse."

Examples of unfamiliar words — or unfamiliar uses of words that some would otherwise consider familiar — are found throughout the corpus, often in the give-and-take between Wolfe and Archie.

- Aristology, chapter 1. "The word has never become more than a marginal addition to the language, a source of obscure scholarly humour rather than a term of utility," wrote etymologist Michael Quinion. "It's best known from books by Rex Stout, in which his corpulent protagonist, Nero Wolfe, has a couple of encounters with a group of gourmets, the Ten for Aristology." "The earliest citation in The Oxford English Dictionary is from 1835," wrote ABC NewsRadio. "This rare word turns up in one of Rex Stout's delightful mystery novels featuring the fat detective Nero Wolfe — in a book entitled 'Poison a la Carte'."

== Publication history ==
=== "Poison à la Carte" ===
- 1968, Ellery Queen's Mystery Magazine, April 1968
- 1973, Ellery Queen's Anthology, Spring–Summer 1973

=== Three at Wolfe's Door ===
- 1960, New York: The Viking Press, April 29, 1960, hardcover

Contents include "Poison à la Carte", "Method Three for Murder" and "The Rodeo Murder"
In his limited-edition pamphlet, Collecting Mystery Fiction #10, Rex Stout's Nero Wolfe Part II, Otto Penzler describes the first edition of Three at Wolfe's Door: "Orange cloth, front cover and spine printed with dark brown. Issued in a mainly green-brown dust wrapper."
In April 2006, Firsts: The Book Collector's Magazine estimated that the first edition of Three at Wolfe's Door had a value of between $200 and $350. The estimate is for a copy in very good to fine condition in a like dustjacket.

- 1960, New York: Viking (Mystery Guild), July 1960, hardcover

The far less valuable Viking book club edition may be distinguished from the first edition in three ways:

- The dust jacket has "Book Club Edition" printed on the inside front flap, and the price is absent (first editions may be price clipped if they were given as gifts).
- Book club editions are sometimes thinner and always taller (usually a quarter of an inch) than first editions.
- Book club editions are bound in cardboard, and first editions are bound in cloth (or have at least a cloth spine).

- 1961, London: Collins Crime Club, January 20, 1961, hardcover
- 1961, New York: Bantam #A-2276, August 1961
- 1995, New York: Bantam Crime Line ISBN 0-553-23803-5 September 1995, paperback, Rex Stout Library edition with introduction by Margaret Maron
- 1997, Newport Beach, California: Books on Tape, Inc. ISBN 0-7366-4060-6 October 31, 1997, audio cassette (unabridged, read by Michael Prichard)
- 2010, New York: Bantam Crimeline ISBN 978-0-307-75622-0 June 9, 2010, e-book

== Adaptations ==
=== Nero Wolfe (A&E Network) ===
"Poison à la Carte" was adapted for the second season of the A&E TV series A Nero Wolfe Mystery (2001–2002). Directed by George Bloomfield from a teleplay by Lee Goldberg and William Rabkin, the episode made its debut May 26, 2002, on A&E.

Timothy Hutton is Archie Goodwin; Maury Chaykin is Nero Wolfe. Other members of the cast (in credits order) include Colin Fox (Fritz Brenner), Bill Smitrovich (Inspector Cramer), R.D. Reid (Sergeant Purley Stebbins), Hrant Alianak (Zoltan Mahany), Carlo Rota (Felix Courbet), David Hemblen (Louis Hewitt), Dominic Cuzzocrea (Vincent Pyle), James Tolkan (Adrian Dart), David Schurmann (Emil Kreis), Gary Reineke (Mr. Leacraft), Jack Newman (Mr. Schriver), Michelle Nolden (Helen Iacono), Emily Hampshire (Carol Annis), Hayley Verlyn (Fern Faber), Sarain Boylan (Nora Jaret), Dina Barrington (Lucy Morgan) and Lindy Booth (Peggy Choate). Choreographer Vanessa Harwood appears, uncredited, in the introductory sequence.

In addition to original music by Nero Wolfe composer Michael Small, the soundtrack includes music by W. C. Handy (titles), Wolfgang Amadeus Mozart, Felix Mendelssohn and Dick Walter.

In international broadcasts, the 45-minute A&E version of "Poison a la Carte" is expanded into a 90-minute widescreen telefilm. Boyd Banks, Christine Brubaker and Nicky Guadagni make uncredited appearances in the international version.

A Nero Wolfe Mystery is available on DVD from A&E Home Video (ISBN 0-7670-8893-X).
