= Tecumseh Fox =

Tecumseh Fox is a fictional private detective created by American mystery writer Rex Stout to provide some diversity from his housebound and opinionated creation Nero Wolfe. Fox appeared in three novels published between 1939 and 1941.

Although the character's name sounds native American, he is not. In Double for Death, he explains that his full name is William Tecumseh Sherman Fox, so he was supposedly named for the American Civil War general William Tecumseh Sherman. It seems probable that Stout chose this name in order to justify Fox's nickname, "Tec," which is also a slang term for detective. (A similar motive was presumably behind the naming of another Stout detective, the beautiful Theodolinda "Dol" Bonner.) The surname "Fox" was presumably chosen as an analogy to "Wolf(e)."

Fox's Westchester County is located in the same universe as Wolfe's New York City. Even though the two men seem to be unaware of each other's existence, both are acquainted with operatives from Bonner & Raffray and the Bascom Agency. Characters in both series dine at Rusterman's, dance at the Flamingo Club, frequent the Churchill Hotel, read the Gazette, and drive Wethersill convertibles.

Stout created three mystery novels with this lead character before devoting his fiction exclusively to Nero Wolfe stories:

- Double for Death (1939)
- Bad for Business (1940)
- The Broken Vase (1941)

Fox never attained Wolfe's popularity with editors or readers. In 1940, the editors of The American Magazine, to which Stout had offered Bad for Business, offered to pay Stout extra if he would rewrite an abridged version of the story featuring Wolfe instead of Fox. This became "Bitter End," the first of Stout's shorter-length Wolfe works.
