= Mountain Cat =

1939 novel by Rex Stout

Mountain Cat (aka The Mountain Cat Murders)
- Author: Rex Stout
- Language: English
- Genre: Detective fiction
- Publisher: Farrar & Rinehart
- Publication date: July 27, 1939
- Publication place: United States
- Media type: Print (Hardcover)
- Pages: 306 pp.

Mountain Cat (a.k.a. The Mountain Cat Murders) is a mystery novel by Rex Stout, first published in book form in 1939. The story first appeared in the June 1939 issue of The American Magazine, abridged and titled Dark Revenge.

== Plot summary ==
Delia Brand, the protagonist, is a beautiful young woman living in tiny Cody, Wyoming. Delia is determined to avenge the tragic deaths of her parents; her prospector father's by shooting and her mother's suicide from grief. When she believes she knows the culprit, she buys some cartridges and announces her intention to shoot a man. After discussing her intentions with her uncle Quinby Pellet, the town taxidermist, Delia goes to visit her sister, Clara.

Clara Brand is secretary to Dan Jackson, who runs a grubstaking business for local prospectors, and has just lost her job. In the middle of Delia's argument with Dan, she hears noises outside the office and discovers that Quin has been knocked unconscious by someone whom he hasn't seen. After dealing with the doctor and the police, Delia returns to her car to find that her gun and cartridges have been stolen.

Dan Jackson's father-in-law Lem Sammis is Delia's godfather, Delia goes to see him and his brassy wife Evelina to get Clara's job back. Lem agrees and gives Delia a note to Dan to say so. When Delia returns to the office to confront Dan once again, she finds him dead and is arrested for his murder, due to her earlier incautious statements.

However, very few people know that, although the late Dan Jackson was no favorite of Delia's, her actual suspicions were of the Reverend Rufus Toale. Other characters of interest include Delia's lawyer and suitor, Tyler Dillon; millionaire playgirl Wynne Cowles, known to all as the "Mountain Cat," who has come to Cody for her second divorce in two years; and illiterate prospector Squint Hurley. Squint Hurley comes up with a document found near Delia's father's body that he's never been able to read, which leads Delia to the identity and motivation of the real murderer.

== Literary significance and criticism ==
- Jacques Barzun and Wendell Hertig Taylor, A Catalogue of Crime — A non-Nero Wolfe mystery which is also a Western. The "Mountain Cat" is a wealthy and glamorous woman — is she a villain or not? Other distinctive characters engage our interest, but the book as a whole affords little more than mild pleasure.
- John McAleer, Rex Stout: A Biography — Nineteen thirty-nine was Rex's annus mirabilis as a novelist. From birthday to birthday, in 1938 and 1939, he published five novels — Mr. Cinderella (1 December 1938), Some Buried Caesar (2 February 1939), Mountain Cat (27 July 1939), Double for Death (3 October 1939), and Red Threads (1 December 1939) — in hardcover. Another, Over My Dead Body, the seventh Wolfe novel, appeared in The American Magazine.

== Publication history ==
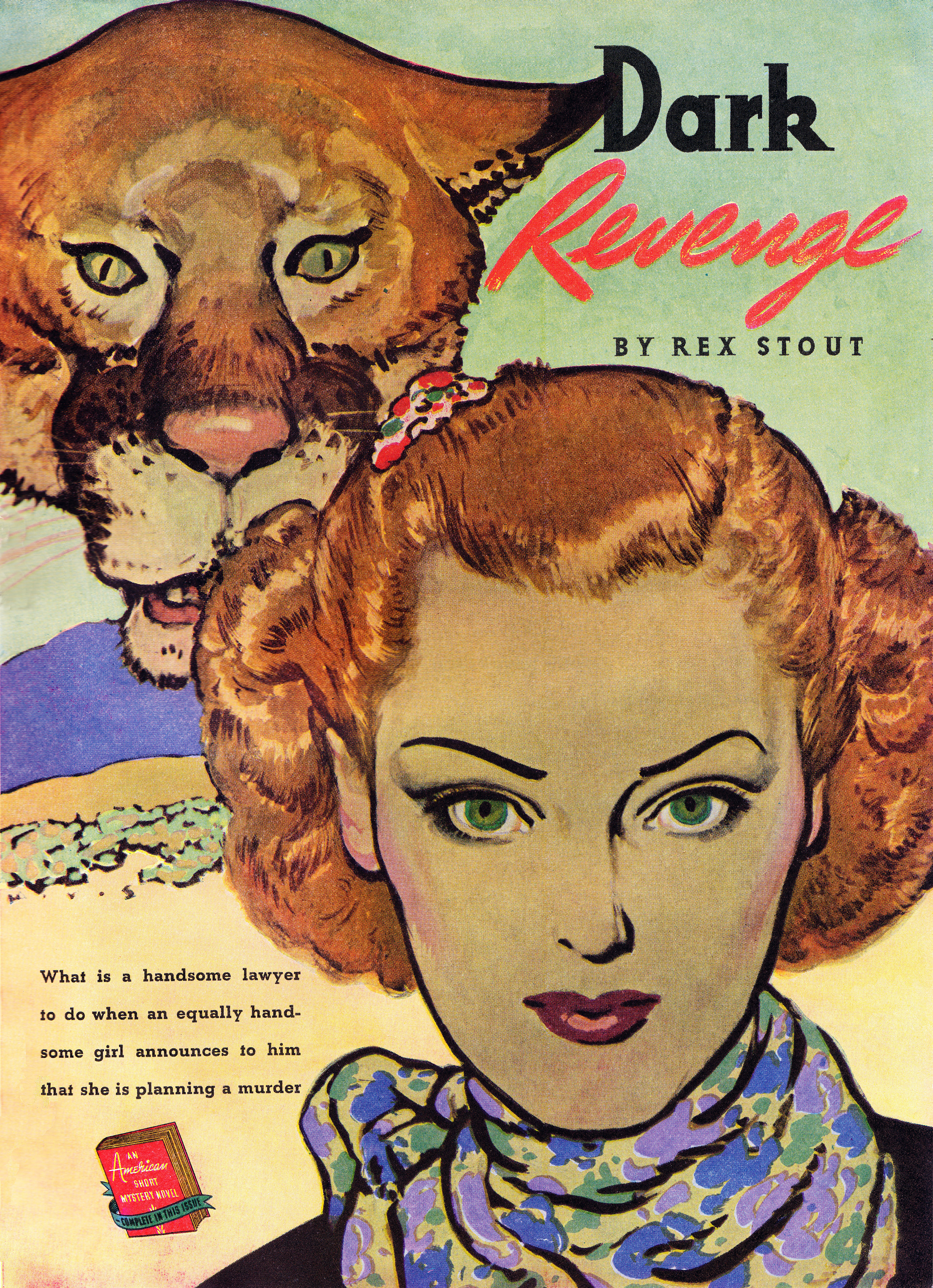
Harold von Schmidt illustrated the abridged version of the novel for The American Magazine (June 1939)

- 1939, The American Magazine, abridged as Dark Revenge, June 1939
- 1939, New York: Farrar & Rinehart, July 27, 1939, hardcover
- 1939, Toronto: Oxford University Press, hardcover
- 1940, London: Collins Crime Club, March 7, 1940, hardcover
- 1940, New York: Grosset & Dunlap, hardcover
- 1943, New York: Dell #28 (mapback by Gerald Gregg), paperback; new edition #D-252, December 1958; new edition #5849, September 1964
- 1971, New York: Pyramid #T2389, January 1971; second printing, #N3161, May 1974; fourth printing #V3161, February 1977 (as The Mountain Cat Murders)
- 2011, New York: Bantam Crimeline ISBN 978-0-307-76821-6 August 17, 2011, e-book
