= Three at Wolfe's Door =

- Author: Rex Stout
- Cover artist: Bill English
- Language: English
- Series: Nero Wolfe
- Genre: Detective fiction
- Publisher: Viking Press
- Publication date: April 29, 1960
- Publication place: United States
- Media type: Print (hardcover)
- Pages: 186 pp. (first edition)
- OCLC: 1389148
- Preceded by: Plot It Yourself
- Followed by: Too Many Clients

Three at Wolfe's Door is a collection of Nero Wolfe mystery novellas by Rex Stout, published by the Viking Press in 1960. The book comprises three stories, one of them published previously:

- "Poison à la Carte"
- "Method Three for Murder" (previously serialized in three issues of The Saturday Evening Post, January 30–February 13, 1960)
- "The Rodeo Murder"

== Publication history ==
- 1960, New York: The Viking Press, April 29, 1960, hardcover

In his limited-edition pamphlet, Collecting Mystery Fiction #10, Rex Stout's Nero Wolfe Part II, Otto Penzler describes the first edition of Three at Wolfe's Door: "Orange cloth, front cover and spine printed with dark brown. Issued in a mainly green-brown dust wrapper."
In April 2006, Firsts: The Book Collector's Magazine estimated that the first edition of Three at Wolfe's Door had a value of between $200 and $350. The estimate is for a copy in very good to fine condition in a like dustjacket.

- 1960, New York: Viking (Mystery Guild), July 1960, hardcover

The far less valuable Viking book club edition may be distinguished from the first edition in three ways:

- The dust jacket has "Book Club Edition" printed on the inside front flap, and the price is absent (first editions may be price clipped if they were given as gifts).
- Book club editions are sometimes thinner and always taller (usually a quarter of an inch) than first editions.
- Book club editions are bound in cardboard, and first editions are bound in cloth (or have at least a cloth spine).

- 1961, London: Collins Crime Club, January 20, 1961, hardcover
- 1961, New York: Bantam #A-2276, August 1961
- 1995, New York: Bantam Crime Line ISBN 0-553-23803-5 September 1995, paperback, Rex Stout Library edition with introduction by Margaret Maron
- 1997, Newport Beach, California: Books on Tape, Inc. ISBN 0-7366-4060-6 October 31, 1997, audio cassette (unabridged, read by Michael Prichard)
- 2010, New York: Bantam Crimeline ISBN 978-0-307-75622-0 June 9, 2010, e-book
