= Sumner Blossom =

American magazine editor

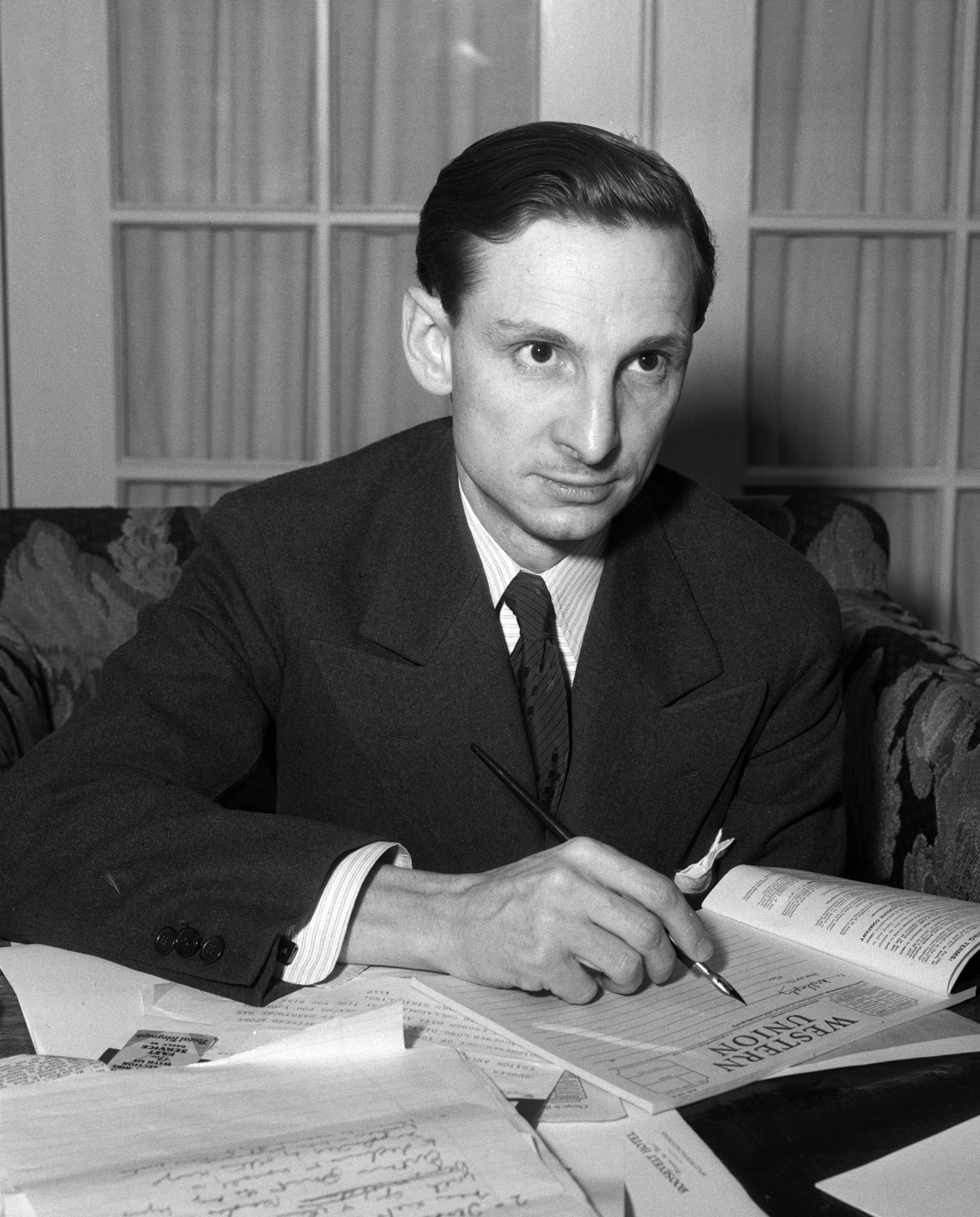
Blossom in 1932

Sumner N. Blossom (June 25, 1892 – March 1977) was an American magazine editor. During the 1920s, Blossom worked as editor for Popular Science magazine. In 1929 he joined The American Magazine as its editor, a position he held until the magazine's closure in August 1956.

Blossom was a graduate of Westport High School in Kansas City, Missouri, where he played football.

While editor of The American Magazine, Sumner Blossom published short stories by many outstanding writers of the day but also adopted policies that provided opportunities for unknown writers to have their work published. Blossom arranged to hide the author's name on all works of fiction during the selection process. The magazine's staff only learned the author's identity once they accepted or rejected a manuscript. Hence, an unknown writer whose unsolicited work had been drawn from the slush pile, could be selected for publication based on literary merit, not just because of an established reputation.

Blossom was living in Babylon, New York, when he died in 1977.
