= Mapback =

Dell Books paperbacks with map back covers

Dell Mapback#173, 1947

Crime map from Dell 173

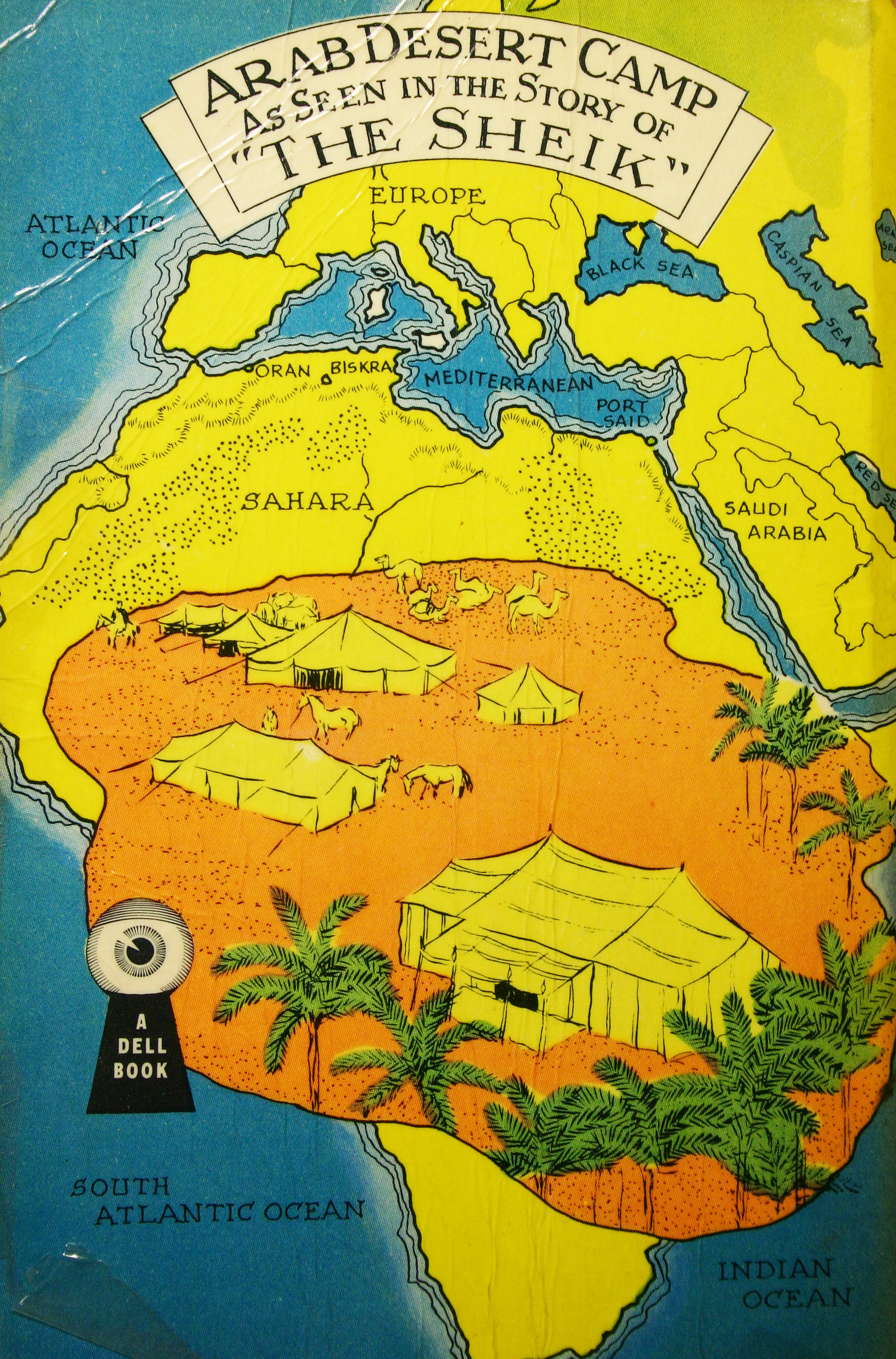
Dell Mapback, The Sheik

Mapback is a term used by paperback collectors to refer to the earliest paperback books published by Dell Books, beginning in 1943. The books are known as mapbacks because the back cover of the book contains a map that illustrates the location of the action. Dell books were numbered in series. Mapbacks extend from #5 to at least #550; then maps became less of a fixed feature of the books and disappeared entirely in 1951. (Numbers 1 through 4 had no map, although a later re-publication of #4, The American Gun Mystery by Ellery Queen, added a map.) The occasional number in the series between #5 and #550 contains no map, but some sort of full-page graphic or text connected with the book's contents.

The artwork of the maps began with quite detailed maps, and later numbers contain more stylized ones. "The back cover map was very popular with readers and remains popular with collectors ... the Dell 'mapbacks' are among the most well known vintage paperbacks."

"Dell's most memorable design innovation was not on the front but on the back covers ... the entire back covers given over to maps, or variously charts, blueprints, or what have you to represent story locale or scene of the crime: a stretch of California highway, the interior of an apartment, a sheik's 'city of stones.' It was an enjoyable if slightly goofy gimmick and, amazingly, managed to last nearly ten years."

== Other features ==
"Besides distinctive front covers and back-cover maps, Dell paperbacks also had a number of other interesting features, including an "eye-in-keyhole" logo, front-cover blurbs, character lists, lists of key items or events in the book ("tantalizer-pages"), crowded title pages, and special chapter titles."

Some publishers, including Dell, thoughtfully included brief lists of the main characters in their books -- especially in mysteries -- to allow readers to keep the characters straight. In mapbacks, "Persons this Mystery is about" followed the inside flyleaf, and gave a short descriptive paragraph. For instance, the protagonist of the mapback shown at right is described as follows:

"Rogan Kincaid, a gambler, tall, lean, enigmatic and attractive to women, believes there is a logical explanation for everything, but is ready to change his mind after witnessing some of the goings-on at Cabrioun, an isolated hunting lodge near the Canadian border."

The "tantalizer-pages" contained two features meant to entice the browsing reader. "What this Mystery is about" gives a list of clues and events that are found within. Those from Rim of the Pit include:

"A dead man's VOICE floating on the wind across a lonely, frozen lake ... An encased ACCORDION playing a dead man's favorite song ... A SEANCE in an isolated lodge at which a medium is forced by her second husband to summon the spirit of her first husband ... A terrifying THING which seems to take possession of a man ... FOOTPRINTS which seem to begin nowhere; end nowhere ... A weird, flying, manlike CREATURE ... A SILVER BULLET molded by a half-crazed man ... Horrible MURDER, apparently unsolvable, of a supernatural origin."

And the enticing section, "Wouldn't you like to Know --"

- What made a Great Dane suddenly leap to his feet during the seance, growl and quiver in fear?
- Why the appearance of the hideous apparition caused such obvious terror in the medium?
- How a man escaped from a strongly barricaded room?
- What a windigo is?
- The significance of the words "net" and "emit" on the inside of an envelope?
- Why all the mirrors in the dead woman's room were smashed?

Of course, non-mysteries had somewhat less tantalizing clues and questions, but the same format was kept. The "List of Exciting Chapters" featured chapter titles which were frequently added or changed by Dell editors.

== Types of mapbacks ==
Mapbacks were primarily mysteries, but many different sorts of books found their way into this inclusive line. A few oddities were published without a map on the back cover. Dell "War Books" such as #26, The Raft and #32, This Time For Keeps, had back covers which exhorted the reader to "Buy War Bonds and Stamps", as did books of jokes and cartoons such as #38, Liberty Laughs and #77, G.I. Jokes. The rarest mapback of all is #278, Second Dell Book of Crossword Puzzles edited by Kathleen Rafferty, also map-less.

Two other genres which had a number of entries in the mapback line were romances and Westerns. Romances were not frequent, and were by "name" authors such as Faith Baldwin (#116, Honor Bound) and Mary Renault (#189, Kind Are Her Answers), only occasionally descending to the level of the "nurse romance". The quality of Westerns was also generally high, including authors such as William MacLeod Raine (#179, Trail's End) and Bliss Lomax (Harry Sinclair Drago) (#271, Gunsmoke and Trail Dust).

There are a number of movie tie-in novels in the series. One of the most significant is Dell #262, Rope as by Alfred Hitchcock -- actually written by Don Ward -- with a cover art featuring James Stewart. Gerald Butler's novel Kiss the Blood Off My Hands was also published with a mapback (Dell #242) in December 1948, under the title The Unafraid [Kiss the Blood Off My Hands], featuring a cover art illustration of Joan Fontaine and Burt Lancaster, tying in with Norma Productions' film Kiss the Blood Off My Hands. Other novels in the series are those upon which well-known films were based, although without movie tie-in covers -- these include Tugboat Annie, The Sheik, Now, Voyager, The Harvey Girls and Mary Roberts Rinehart's The Bat.

But by far the largest number of mapbacks is made up of mysteries. The mapback series contains some significant first editions ("first as such") by famous authors such as Dashiell Hammett, and interesting editions of such authors as Rex Stout (Too Many Cooks #45; The Red Bull #70), Agatha Christie, Cornell Woolrich, Erle Stanley Gardner writing as A. A. Fair, John Dickson Carr and his alter ego Carter Dickson, and Ellery Queen. There are editions of other mysteries which have stood the test of time and are still considered significant today, such as the works of Phoebe Atwood Taylor (under her own name and as Alice Tilton), Brett Halliday (pen name of Davis Dresser), Louis Joseph Vance, Patricia Wentworth, Stuart Palmer, Clayton Rawson, Earl Derr Biggers, Patricia McGerr, Baynard Kendrick, Margaret Millar, Mary Roberts Rinehart, C. W. Grafton (father of Sue Grafton) and many others.

The Dell mapback line also contains a number of mysteries by writers who have fallen out of favor over the years -- or who were never popular. Collectors cherish the camp value of such mysteries as Murder Wears Mukluks by Eunice Mays Boyd, The Body That Wasn't Uncle by George Worthing Yates, and Death Wears a White Gardenia by Zelda Popkin.

The mapback line is also notable for what it does not contain -- mapbacks never partook of two popular trends in the 1950s that flourished at other paperback houses, namely the "lesbian confession" novel and the "juvenile delinquent" or "juvie" novel.

Many early paperbacks published by one of Dell's rivals, Bantam Books, also included a map of the location of the story's action, but these were printed on the inside of books cover and the first page of the book itself.

== See also ==
- Ruth O'Neal Belew
