= Our Secret Weapon: The Truth =

American TV public affairs series (1950–1951)

- Genre: Public Affairs
- Starring: Leo Cherne; Ralph de Toledano
- Country of origin: United States
- Original language: English

Production
- Running time: 30 minutes

Original release
- Network: DuMont
- Release: October 22, 1950 – April 17, 1951

Our Secret Weapon: The Truth is a public affairs program broadcast on the DuMont Television Network from October 22, 1950, to April 17, 1951, and hosted by Leo Cherne and Ralph de Toledano.

== Production ==
Our Secret Weapon: The Truth had its origins in the Freedom House radio program Our Secret Weapon (1942–43), a CBS Radio series hosted by Rex Stout, which was created to counter Axis shortwave radio propaganda broadcasts during World War II.

The concept was revived during the Korean War as a weekly series that would "answer Communist lies about us" with testimony from special guests. The program featured conservative commentators Leo Cherne and Ralph de Toledano.

== See also ==
- List of programs broadcast by the DuMont Television Network
- List of surviving DuMont Television Network broadcasts

== Bibliography ==
- David Weinstein, The Forgotten Network: DuMont and the Birth of American Television (Philadelphia: Temple University Press, 2004) ISBN 1-59213-245-6
- Alex McNeil, Total Television, Fourth edition (New York: Penguin Books, 1980) ISBN 0-14-024916-8
- Tim Brooks and Earle Marsh, The Complete Directory to Prime Time Network TV Shows, Third edition (New York: Ballantine Books, 1964) ISBN 0-345-31864-1
