= Our Secret Weapon =

World War II-era CBS radio series

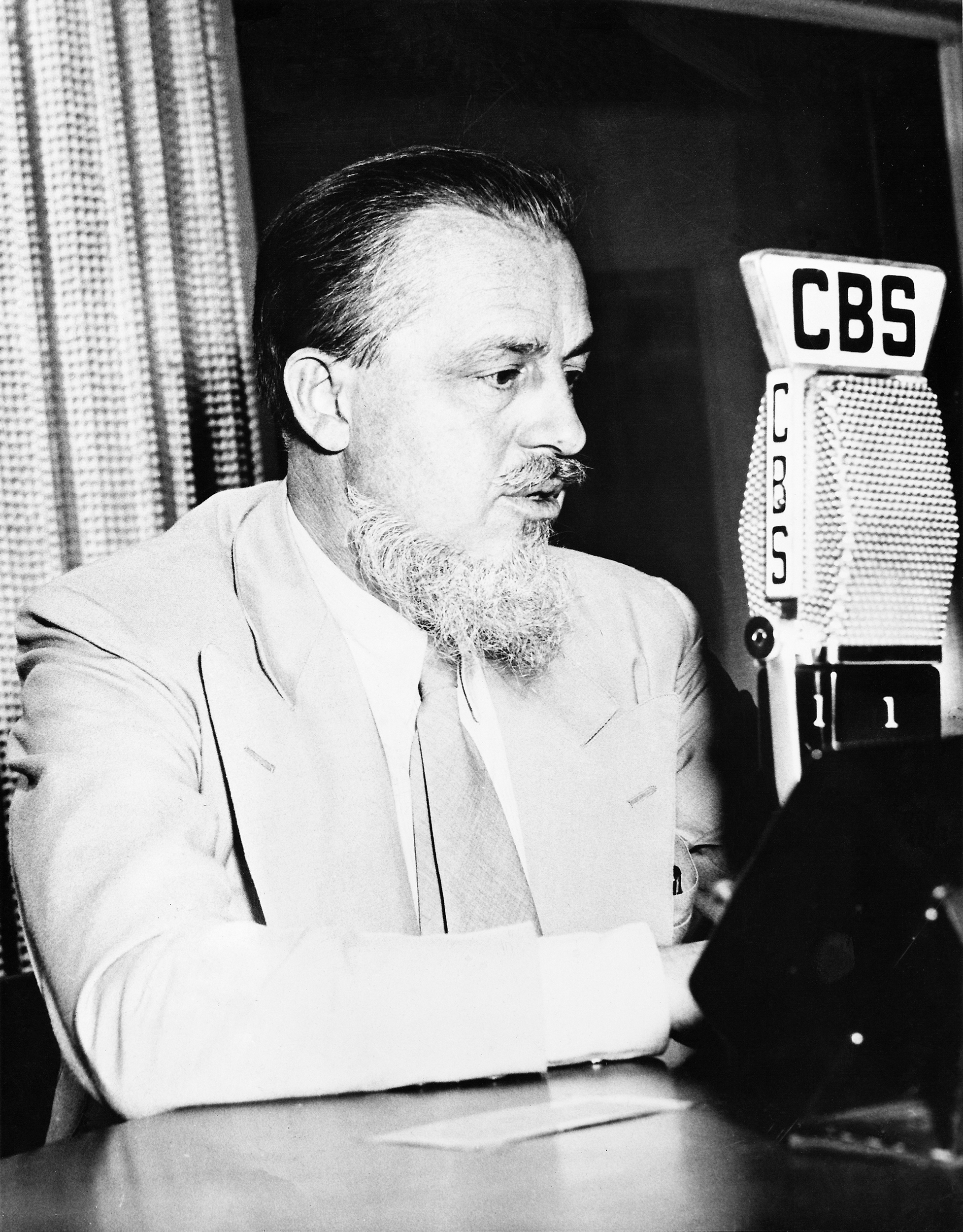
- Rex Stout of Our Secret Weapon (December 1942)
- Genre: Counterpropaganda talk
- Running time: 15 minutes
- Country of origin: United States
- Language(s): English
- Home station: CBS
- Hosted by: Rex Stout
- Starring: Rex Stout; Paul Luther; Guy Repp; Ted Osborne
- Created by: Sue Taylor White
- Written by: Rex Stout
- Directed by: Paul White
- Produced by: Freedom House
- Original release: August 9, 1942 – October 8, 1943
- No. of episodes: 62

Our Secret Weapon (1942–1943) is a CBS radio series created to counter Axis shortwave radio propaganda broadcasts during World War II. Writer Rex Stout, chairman of the Writers' War Board and representative of Freedom House, would rebut the most entertaining lies of the week. Sponsored by Freedom House and Philco, the 15-minute weekly series was broadcast Sundays at 7 p.m. ET through October 18, 1942, then Fridays at 7:15 p.m. ET through its final broadcast October 8, 1943.

"Secret Weapon was designed to whip up and excite the nation to a greater war effort—in industry, in buying war bonds, in every avenue toward victory," said series creator Sue Taylor White of Freedom House.

== Production ==
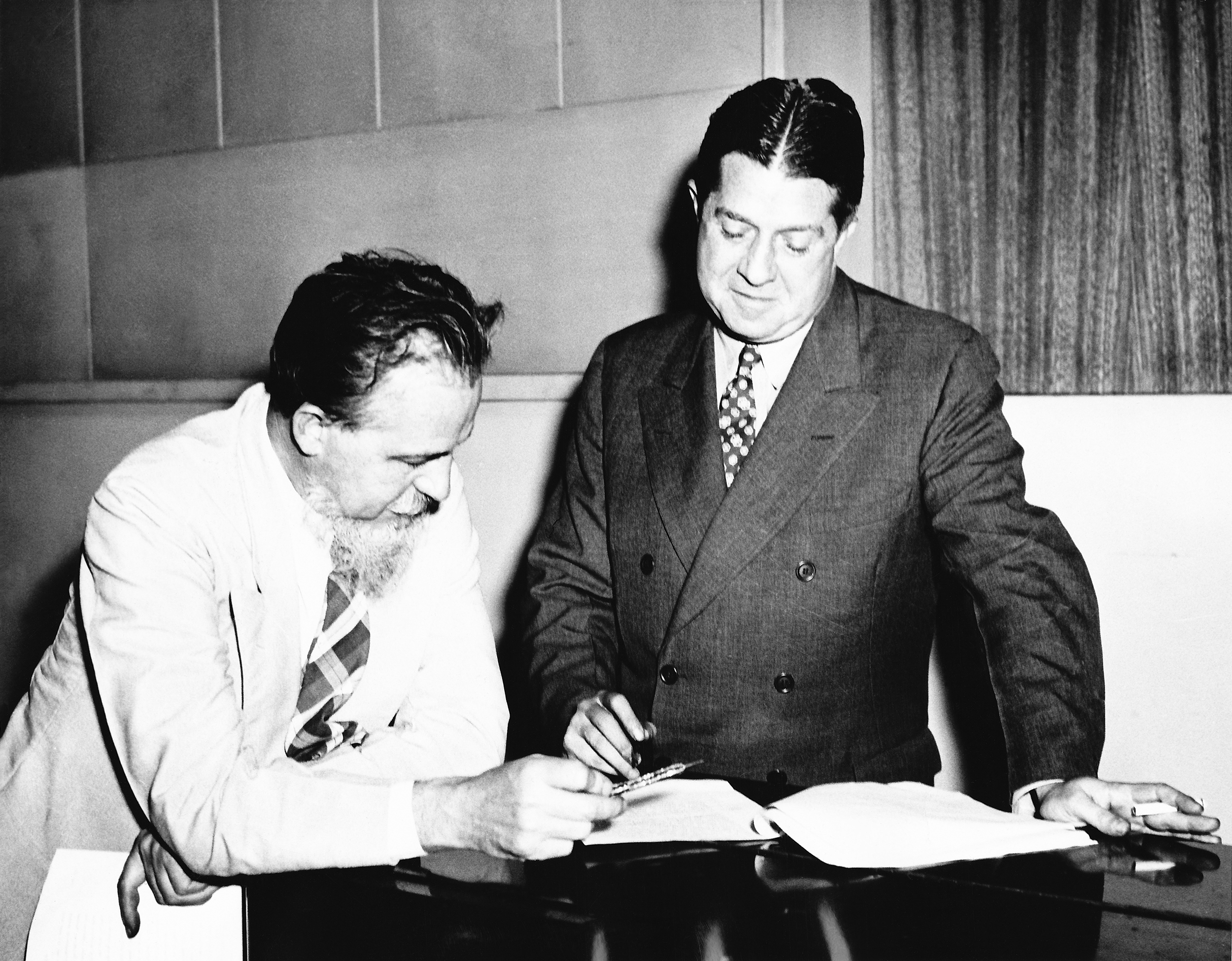
Author Rex Stout and CBS News director Paul White review propaganda that will be exposed on Our Secret Weapon (October 1942)

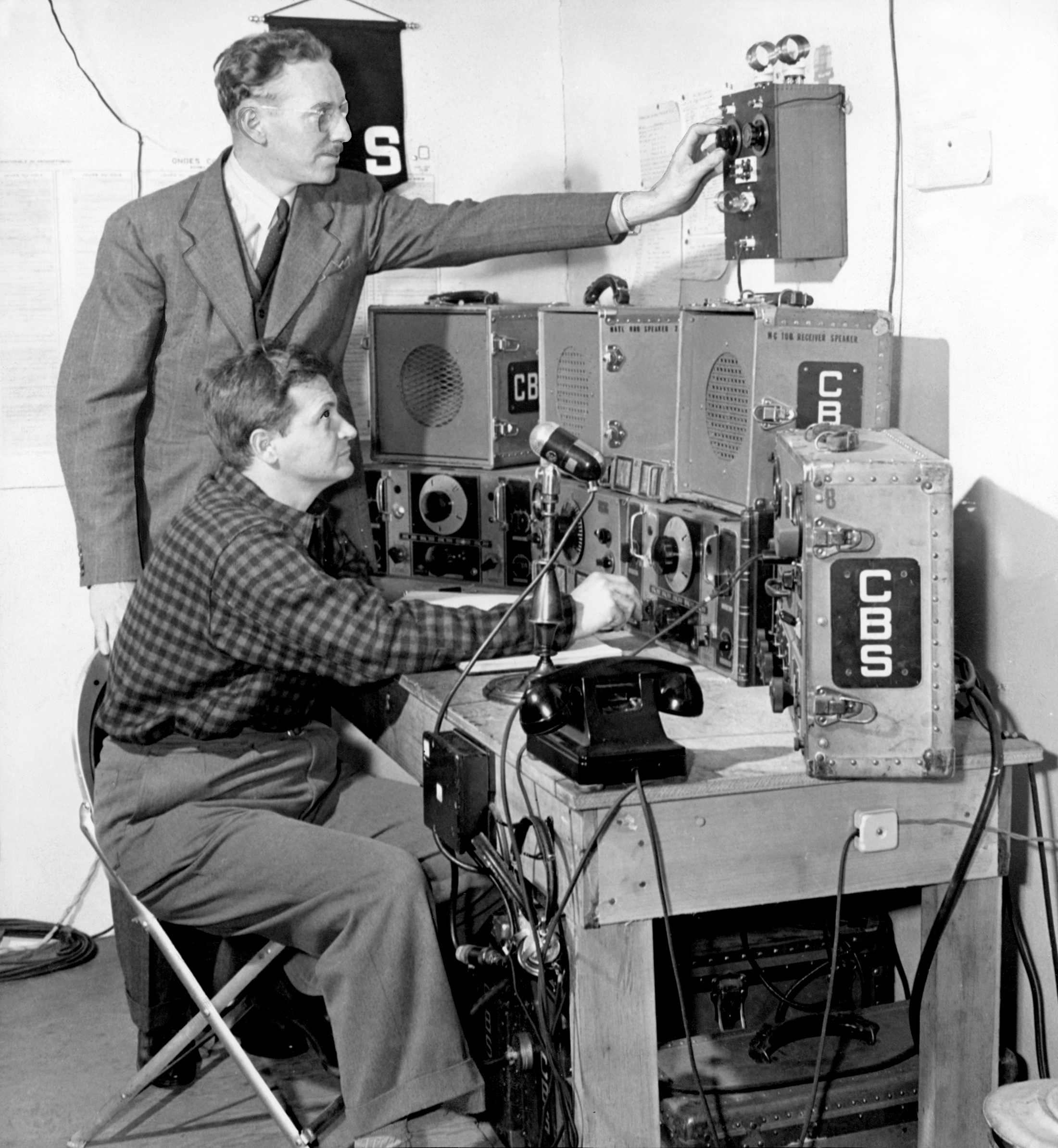
CBS shortwave listening post (May 1941)

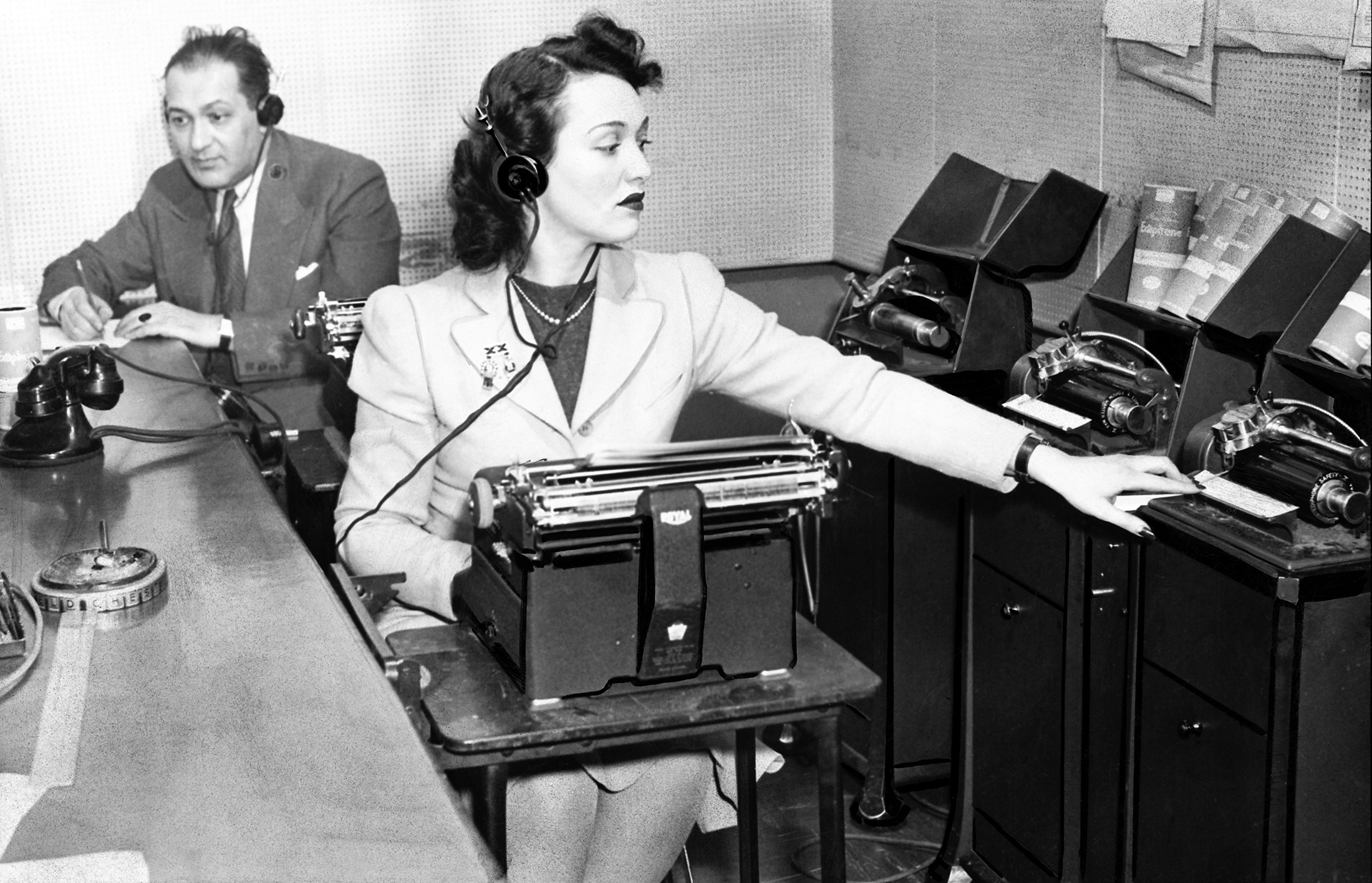
Translating and transcribing propaganda broadcasts from Europe recorded at the CBS listening post (May 1941)

On August 9, 1942, Rex Stout moderated the first of 62 wartime radio broadcasts of Our Secret Weapon, produced by Freedom House and airing on CBS. The first ten programs were sponsored solely by Freedom House, and in the eleventh week Philco became a co-sponsor.

"Every Friday Mr. Stout, author of mystery stories, directs Our Secret Weapon over the nationwide network of the Columbia Broadcasting System," reported The Christian Science Monitor in February 1943. "There is no mystery, however, over the secret weapon Mr. Stout talks about—it is the simple thing known as 'plain fact.'"

The idea for the counterpropaganda series was that of Sue Taylor White of Freedom House. Her husband, Paul White, was the first director of CBS News, and he directed research for Our Secret Weapon.

CBS had begun a shortwave listening program in September 1939, on an experimental basis, at the National Lawn Tennis Championships at West Side Tennis Club in Forest Hills, New York. Engineers installed equipment at the CBS booth when the location was found to have good reception, and monitors relayed European shortwave news to CBS headquarters in New York between tennis matches. Throughout World War II, CBS captured Allied and enemy shortwave communications from more than 60 international stations via secretly located receivers.

By the time Our Secret Weapon went on the air in 1942, the CBS shortwave listening station directed by John W. (Jack) Gerber employed 11 linguists monitoring Axis broadcasts 19 hours a day. "We wondered if they'd tell enough lies in a week to keep the program interesting," Gerber told Time magazine. "They sure do. We hear twice as many as we can use."

"Rex Stout, creator of the orchid-loving detective Nero Wolfe, achieved a new wave of popularity on this amusing series," wrote radio historian John Dunning. "Axis shortwave broadcasts were monitored by a staff of linguists at the CBS listening station; what were considered the most outrageous lies were then typed into a weekly log of about 30,000 words. … The most entertaining lies, as well as those lending themselves to what Time called Stout's 'lunch-counter sarcasm,' were used on the air."

Stout told the Wide World News Service, "There are various ways to call a man a liar. One way is just to scream it at him, which doesn't prove anything. Another is to establish facts by long and patient investigation. Still another way is not to call him a liar at all—let him do it himself."

The Axis propaganda was presented in skit form, read in accents by a trio of actors: Paul Luther (Adolf Hitler, Hermann Göring, Joseph Goebbels, German radio broadcasters), Guy Repp (Benito Mussolini, Rome radio broadcasters), and Ted Osborne (Hirohito, Hideki Tōjō, Japanese radio broadcasters).

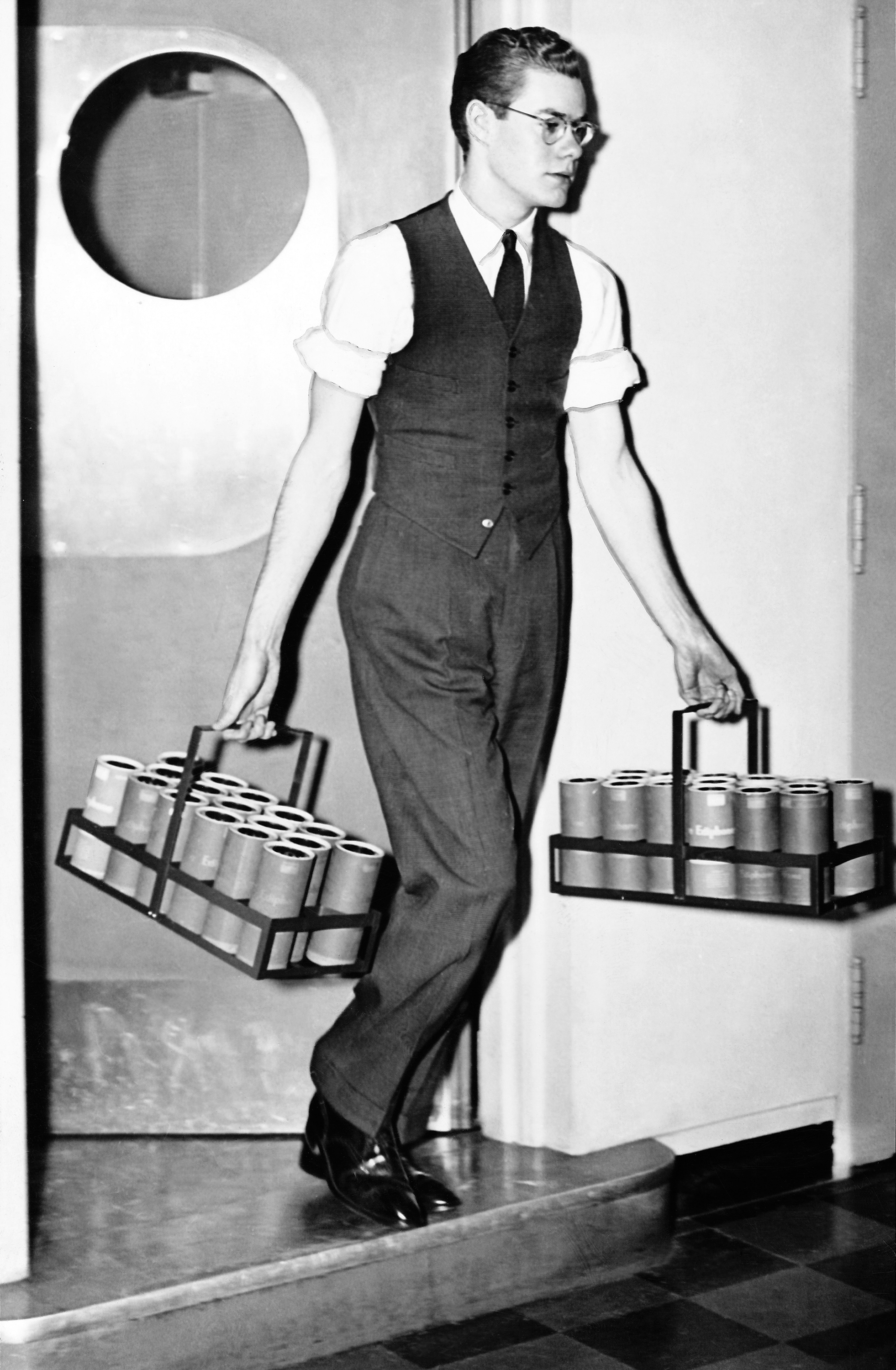
Delivering wax cylinder recordings of propaganda broadcasts for analysis (May 1941)

"Hundreds of Axis propaganda broadcasts, beamed not merely to the Allied countries but to neutrals, were sifted weekly," Stout's biographer John McAleer wrote. "Rex himself, for an average of twenty hours a week, pored over the typewritten yellow sheets of accumulated data ... Then, using a dialogue format—Axis commentators making their assertions, and Rex Stout, the lie detective, offering his refutations—he dictated to his secretary the script of the fifteen-minute broadcast."

Six thousand copies of each script were printed and distributed every week to schools, libraries, army bases, naval installations and Japanese-American internment camps. The programs were also broadcast via shortwave radio to South America and Britain.

"The United States people can recognize the Axis statements as lies but it must be brought to their attention that these monstrous lies are being told," Stout said in a September 1942 interview. "It must be drawn to their attention so they will know how words are killing men in this war as effectively as guns and tanks and bullets."

In October 1943, following its 62nd weekly broadcast, The New York Times reported that "the Rex Stout program, Our Secret Weapon, has run its course." The CBS shortwave listening station continued its work through the end of World War II. Translations of intercepted broadcasts were teletyped to all New York newspapers, Associated Press, United Press International and International News Service, and in turn disseminated to newspapers and radio stations throughout the United States. Major headline news frequently resulted, since big stories often broke first on radio.

On September 4, 1945, the Library of Congress announced the acceptance of CBS's gift of the total files—24 million words—of the international shortwave broadcasts captured since 1939, translated from more than 15 languages. The Library of Congress transferred some 96,000 typewritten pages into 8,000 feet of 35 millimeter microfilm, and made copies available to libraries throughout the United States.

== Reception ==
In its September 7, 1942, issue, Time magazine wrote, "CBS last month unlimbered against enemy propaganda the kind of weapon which is mighty and shall prevail. Entitled Our Secret Weapon, the program has nothing secret or even subtle about it. A CBS announcer reads a blatant statement from a recent Axis broadcast, then Rex ('Lie Detective') Stout uses it as a clay pigeon to shatter with the truth."

By November 1942 Berlin Radio was reporting that "Rex Stout himself has cut his own production in detective stories from four to one a year and is devoting the entire balance of his time to writing official war propaganda." Newsweek described Stout as "stripping Axis short-wave propaganda down to the barest nonsensicals ... There's no doubt of its success."

In 1943, Our Secret Weapon won the Annual Advertising Award medal presented to the sponsored radio program contributing most to the advancement of radio advertising as a social force. The Advertising Awards were created in 1924 by Edward W. Bok, and were administered by the Harvard School of Business until 1930, when Advertising & Selling magazine became the award sponsor.

== Legacy ==
In 1950, Freedom House updated Our Secret Weapon for television, in a public affairs program titled Our Secret Weapon: The Truth. Revived during the Korean War as a weekly series that would "answer Communist lies about us," the program featured conservative commentators Leo Cherne and Ralph de Toledano. Our Secret Weapon: The Truth aired on the DuMont Television Network from October 22, 1950, to April 17, 1951.
