= L.A. Requiem =

1999 detective novel by Robert Crais

- First edition
- Author: Robert Crais
- Language: English
- Series: Elvis Cole series
- Genre: Detective fiction
- Publisher: Bantam
- Publication date: 1999
- Publication place: United States
- Media type: Print (Paperback)
- Pages: 416 pp
- ISBN: 0-345-43447-1
- Preceded by: Indigo Slam
- Followed by: The Last Detective

L.A. Requiem is a 1999 detective novel by Robert Crais. It is the eighth in a series of linked novels centering on the private investigator Elvis Cole.

== Plot ==
Elvis Cole is contacted by business partner and friend Joe Pike to accept the request of Frank Garcia, owner of a tortilla company. The old tycoon wants the two to look for his daughter Karen Garcia, whom he hasn't heard from for a day. Despite Elvis' doubts about the investigation, Pike accepts the case.

The investigations are short-lived: after a short time, Karen's body is found by the police on a jogging trail in Lake Hollywood. Thanks to the connections Garcia Sr. has on the Los Angeles City Council, Cole and Pike can witness the continuation of the investigation, coordinated by Harvey Krantz, member of the Robbery-Homicide Section of the Los Angeles Department. Between Pike and Krantz there is a relationship of deep hatred due to an investigation carried out years earlier by Krantz regarding Abel "Woz" Wozniak, of whom Pike was a patrol companion, about his involvement in a racket of burglars.

As the research continues, new characters are added to the initial duo and new mysteries emerge from the past, significantly marking the events of Cole and, above all, of Pike, who will have to deal with what, at first glance, seems yet another murder of a serial killer.

== Awards ==
L.A. Requiem won the 2000 Dilys Award and was nominated for the Edgar Award, the Anthony Award, and the Shamus Award in the same year.
