= Freedom House =

American nonprofit organization

- Formation: October 31, 1941; 85 years ago
- Type: Research institute Think tank
- Tax ID no.: 13-1656647
- Headquarters: 1225 I Street NW, Suite 1200, Washington, D.C., U.S.
- CEO: Jamie Fly
- Key people: Norman Willox, Chair, Board of Trustees
- Revenue: $93.4 million (2022)
- Expenses: $85.3 million (2022)
- Staff: approx. 230
- Website: freedomhouse.org

Freedom House is a nonprofit organization based in Washington, D.C. It is best known for political advocacy surrounding issues of democracy, political freedom, and human rights. Freedom House was founded in October 1941, with Wendell Willkie and Eleanor Roosevelt serving as its first honorary chairpersons. Most of the organization's funding comes from the U.S. State Department and other government grants. It also receives funds from various semi-public and private foundations, as well as individual contributions.

The organization's annual Freedom in the World report assesses each country's degree of political freedoms and civil liberties. Another key annual report, Freedom on the Net, is Freedom House's annual survey and analysis of internet freedom around the world. While often cited by political scientists, journalists, and policymakers, the organization's democracy indices have received criticism.

Critics have alleged that the organization is biased towards American interests, particularly due to government funding. Earlier, until the 1990s, the organization faced criticism for its reliance on democratic indices created near-exclusively by Raymond Gastil. In 2018, the rankings were criticized by National Review, a conservative magazine, for its perceptions of the NGO being "anti-conservative".

== History ==
Freedom House was incorporated October 31, 1941. Among its founders were Eleanor Roosevelt, Wendell Willkie, Mayor Fiorello La Guardia, Elizabeth Cutter Morrow, Dorothy Thompson, George Field, Herbert Agar, Herbert Bayard Swope, Ralph Bunche, Father George B. Ford, Roscoe Drummond and Rex Stout. Thompson and Dr. Frank Kingdon were co-chairs. George Field (1904–2006) was executive director of the organization until his retirement in 1967.

According to its website, Freedom House was founded in 1941. Several groups were aggressively supporting U.S. entry into World War II and in early autumn 1941, when various group activities began to overlap, the Fight for Freedom Committee began exploring a mass merger. George Field then conceived the idea of all of the groups maintaining their separate identities under one roof—Freedom House—to promote the concrete application of the principles of freedom.

Freedom House had physical form in a New York City building that represented the organization's goals. A converted residence at 32 East 51st Street opened January 22, 1942, as a centre "where all who love liberty may meet, plan their programs and encourage one another". Furnished as a gift of the Allies, the 19-room building included a broadcasting facility. In January 1944, Freedom House moved to 5 West 54th Street, a former residence that Robert Lehman lent to the organization.

Freedom House sponsored influential radio programs including 'The Voice of Freedom' (1942–43) and Our Secret Weapon (1942–43), a CBS radio series created to counter Axis shortwave radio propaganda broadcasts. Rex Stout, chairman of the Writers' War Board and representative of Freedom House, would rebut the most entertaining lies of the week. The series was produced by Paul White, founder of CBS News.

By November 1944, Freedom House was planning to raise money to acquire a building to be named after the recently deceased Wendell L. Willkie. In 1945 an elegant building at 20 West 40th Street was purchased to house the organization. It was named the Willkie Memorial Building.

After the war, as its website states, "Freedom House took up the struggle against the other twentieth century totalitarian threat, Communism ... The organization's leadership was convinced that the spread of democracy would be the best weapon against totalitarian ideologies." Freedom House supported the Marshall Plan and the establishment of NATO. Freedom House also supported the Johnson Administration's Vietnam War policies.

Freedom House was highly critical of McCarthyism. During the 1950s and 1960s, it supported the Civil Rights Movement in the United States and its Leadership included several prominent civil rights activists – though it was sometimes critical of civil rights leaders for their anti-war activism, Freedom House awarded Martin Luther King Jr. and Medgar Evers its annual Freedom Award in 1963. It supported Andrei Sakharov, other Soviet dissidents, and the Solidarity movement in Poland. Freedom House assisted the post-Communist societies in the establishment of independent media, non-governmental think tanks, and the core institutions of electoral politics.

The organization describes itself currently as a clear voice for democracy and freedom around the world. Freedom House states that it:

has vigorously opposed dictatorships in Central America and Chile, apartheid in South Africa, the suppression of the Prague Spring, the Soviet war in Afghanistan, genocide in Bosnia and Rwanda, and the brutal violation of human rights in Cuba, Burma, the People's Republic of China, and Iraq. It has championed the rights of democratic activists, religious believers, trade unionists, journalists, and proponents of free markets.

In 1967, Freedom House absorbed Books USA, which had been created several years earlier by Edward R. Murrow, as a joint venture between the Peace Corps and the United States Information Service.

Since 2001, Freedom House has supported citizens involved in challenges to the existing regimes in Serbia, Ukraine, Kyrgyzstan, Egypt, Tunisia and elsewhere. The organization states, "From South Africa to Jordan, Kyrgyzstan to Indonesia, Freedom House has partnered with regional activists in bolstering civil society; worked to support women's rights; sought justice for victims of torture; defended journalists and free expression advocates; and assisted those struggling to promote human rights in challenging political environments." However, alternative classifications have produced significantly different results from those of the FH for Latin American countries.

In 2025, the incoming Trump administration's foreign aid freeze under executive Order 14169 resulted in Freedom House terminating over 80% of its global programs. The organization was also forced "to lay off a large portion of its staff", and divert funds away from projects such as Freedom in the World to cover other expenses. Freedom House continues to operate, with a greater reliance on private donations.

== Organization ==
Freedom House is a nonprofit organization with approximately 300 staff members worldwide. Headquartered in Washington, D.C., it has field offices in about a dozen countries, including Ukraine, Hungary, Serbia, Jordan, Mexico, and also countries in Central Asia.

Freedom House states that its board of trustees is composed of "business and labor leaders, former senior government officials, scholars, writers, and journalists". All board members are current residents of the United States. Past members of the organization's board of directors include Kenneth Adelman, Farooq Kathwari, Azar Nafisi, Mark Palmer, P. J. O'Rourke and Lawrence Lessig, Zbigniew Brzezinski, Jeane Kirkpatrick, Samuel Huntington, Mara Liasson, Otto Reich, Donald Rumsfeld, Whitney North Seymour, Paul Wolfowitz, Steve Forbes and Bayard Rustin.

=== Funding ===
According to their 2022 financial statement and independent auditors' report, Freedom House reported $93,705,255 of total revenue:

- Federal grants – $79,606,961
- International public agencies – $1,055,339 ($3,826,812 with donor restrictions)
- Corporations and foundations – $1,873,651 ($5,849,073 with donor restrictions)
- Individual contributions – $1,487,190
- Net assets released from restrictions – $2,901,964

Freedom House's total expenses in 2022 were $85,530,680.

== Reports ==
=== Freedom in the World ===
Classification of countries according to the Freedom House's Freedom in the World 2026 survey, concerning the state of world freedom in 2026: Free Partially Free Not Free

Since 1973, Freedom House publishes an annual report, Freedom in the World, which it seeks to assess the current state of civil liberties and political rights in 195 countries and 15 territories.

Freedom House's methods (around 1990) and other democracy-researchers were mentioned as examples of an expert-based evaluation by sociologist Kenneth A. Bollen, who is also an applied statistician. Bollen writes that expert-based evaluations are prone to statistical bias of an unknown direction, that is, not known either to agree with U.S. policy or to disagree with U.S. policy: "Regardless of the direction of distortions, it is highly likely that every set of indicators formed by a single author or organization contains systematic measurement error. The origin of this measure lies in the common methodology of forming measures. Selectivity of information and various traits of the judges fuse into a distinct form of bias that is likely to characterize all indicators from a common publication."

=== Freedom of the Press ===
2015 Freedom of the Press Classifications Not Free Partly Free Free No Data

The Freedom of the Press index was an annual survey of media independence, published between 1980 and 2017. It assessed the degree of print, broadcast, and internet freedom throughout the world, classifying nation-states as "free", "partly-free", and "not-free" as a result.

An independent review of press freedom studies, commissioned by the Knight Foundation in 2006, found that FOP was the best in its class of Press Freedom Indicators.

=== Freedom on the Net ===
The Freedom on the Net reports provide analytical reports and numerical ratings regarding the state of Internet freedom for countries worldwide.

Freedom on the Net's report covers a range of concepts that the other datasets do not, such as new legislation passed, but lacks the country coverage of other datasets.

Expert surveys on the internet by the likes of Freedom House and V-Dem have been found to be more prone to false positives, while the remote sensing research by Access Now and the OpenNet Initiative are more likely to be prone to false negatives.

The Millennium Challenge Corporation used the Key Internet Controls portion of the Freedom on the Net report to inform its country selection process until 2020 when this report was replaced with data on internet shutdowns from Access Now.

== Reception ==
=== Academic commentary ===
From the 1970s until 1990, Raymond Gastil practically produced the reports on his own, though sometimes with help from his wife. Gastil himself described it in 1990 as "a loose, intuitive rating system for levels of freedom or democracy, as defined by the traditional political rights and civil liberties of the Western democracies." Regarding criticisms of his reports, he said: "generally such criticism is based on opinions about Freedom House rather than detailed examination of survey ratings".

In a 1986 report on the methodology used by Gastil and others to create Freedom in the World report, Kenneth A. Bollen noted some bias but found that "no criticisms of which I am aware have demonstrated a systematic bias in all the ratings. Most of the evidence consists of anecdotal evidence of relatively few cases. Whether there is a systematic or sporadic slant in Gastil's ratings is an open question". In a later report by Bollen and Pamela Paxton in 2000, they concluded that from 1972 to 1988 (a specific period they observed), there was "unambiguous evidence of judge-specific measurement errors, which are related to traits of the countries." They estimated that Gastil's method produced a bias of 0.38 standard deviations (s.d.) against Communist countries and a larger bias, 0.5 s.d., favoring Christian countries.

Noam Chomsky and Edward S. Herman have criticized the organization for excessively criticizing states opposed to US interests while being unduly sympathetic to regimes supportive of US interests. Most notably, Freedom House described the 1979 Rhodesian general election as "fair", but described the 1980 Southern Rhodesian general election as "dubious", and found the 1982 Salvadoran presidential election to be "admirable".

In 2001, a study by Mainwaring, Brink, and Perez-Linanhe found the Freedom Index of Freedom in the World to have a strong positive correlation (at least 80%) with three other democracy indices. Mainwaring et al. wrote that Freedom House's index had "two systematic biases: scores for leftist were tainted by political considerations, and changes in scores are sometimes driven by changes in their criteria rather than changes in real conditions". Nonetheless, when evaluated on Latin American countries yearly, Freedom House's index was positively correlated with the index of Adam Przeworski and with the index of the authors themselves. However, according to Przeworski in 2003, the definition of freedom in Gastil (1982) and Freedom House (1990) emphasized liberties rather than the exercise of freedom. He gave the following example: In the United States, citizens are free to form political parties and to vote, yet even in presidential elections only half of U.S. citizens vote; in the U.S., "the same two parties speak in a commercially sponsored unison".

A 2014 report by comparative politics researcher Nils D. Steiner found "strong and consistent evidence of a substantial bias in the FH ratings" before 1988, with bias being reflected by the relationships between the U.S. and the countries under investigation. He writes that after 1989 the findings were not as strong but still hinted at political bias. In 2017, Sarah Sunn Bush wrote that many critics found the original pre-1990 methodology lacking. While this improved after a team was hired in 1990, she says some criticism remains. As for why the Freedom House index is most often quoted in the United States, she notes that its definition of democracy is closely aligned with US foreign policy. US-allied countries tend to get better scores than in other reports. However, because the report is important to US lawmakers and politicians, weaker states seeking US aid or favor are forced to respond to the reports, giving the Freedom House significant influence in those places.

According to a study by academics Jan Erk and Wouter Veenendaal, Freedom House's rankings "overemphasize the more formal aspects of democracy while failing to capture the informal but real power relations and pathways of influence ... and frequently lead to de facto deviations from democracy." States can therefore "look formally liberal-democratic but might be rather illiberal in their actual workings"

UCLA political scientist Daniel Treisman has criticized Freedom House's assessment of Russia. Treisman cited that Freedom House ranks Russia's political rights on the same level as the United Arab Emirates, which is a federation of absolute monarchies with no element of democracy within the system. Freedom House also ranks Russia's civil liberties on the same scale as those of Yemen, where criticism of the president was illegal. Treisman contrasts Freedom House's ranking with the Polity IV scale used by academics, in which Russia has a much better score. In 2018, the Polity IV scale scored the United Arab Emirates at -8, Russia at +4, and the United States at +8.

Academic Wenfang Tang observes that Freedom House reports use criteria developed by Western elites. His study comparing Freedom House rankings with the World Values Survey data measuring respondent's perceptions of freedom in their countries found no statistically significant correlation between the Freedom House measures of freedom and subjective feelings of freedom. According to Tang, Freedom House rankings exaggerate the differences between liberal and non-liberal countries, observing for example that Freedom House scores China near zero, but Chinese survey respondents report a higher level of freedom than do survey respondents in Taiwan, Japan, South Korea, and Singapore. Tang also observes that Freedom House's rating of China as a near zero for human rights conflicts with the seventh wave (2017-2022) World Values survey data indicating that 72% of Chinese are satisfied with the state of human rights in their country.

=== Relationship with the U.S. government ===
In 2006, the Financial Times reported that Freedom House had received funding by the State Department for "clandestine activities" inside Iran. According to the Financial Times, "Some academics, activists and those involved in the growing US business of spreading freedom and democracy are alarmed that such semi-covert activities risk damaging the public and transparent work of other organisations, and will backfire inside Iran."

On December 7, 2004, former U.S. House Representative and Libertarian politician Ron Paul criticized Freedom House for allegedly administering a U.S.-funded program in Ukraine where "much of that money was targeted to assist one particular candidate." Paul said "one part that we do know thus far is that the U.S. government, through the U.S. Agency for International Development (USAID), granted millions of dollars to the Poland-America-Ukraine Cooperation Initiative (PAUCI), which is administered by the U.S.-based Freedom House. PAUCI then sent U.S. Government funds to numerous Ukrainian non-governmental organizations (NGOs). This would be bad enough and would in itself constitute meddling in the internal affairs of a sovereign nation. But, what is worse is that many of these grantee organizations in Ukraine are blatantly in favor of presidential candidate Viktor Yushchenko."

=== Cuban, Sudanese, and Chinese criticism ===
In May 2001, the Committee on Non-Governmental Organizations of the United Nations heard arguments for and against Freedom House. Representatives of Cuba said that the organization is a U.S. foreign policy instrument linked to the CIA and "submitted proof of the politically motivated, interventionist activities the NGO (Freedom House) carried out against their Government". They also claimed a lack of criticism of U.S. human rights violations in the annual reports. Cuba also stated that these violations are well documented by other reports, such as those of Human Rights Watch. Other countries such as China and Sudan also gave criticism. The Russian representative inquired "why this organization, an NGO which defended human rights, was against the creation of the International Criminal Court?"

The U.S. representative stated that alleged links between Freedom House and the CIA were "simply not true". The representative said he agreed that the NGO receives funds from the United States Government, but said this is disclosed in its reports. The representative said the funds were from the United States Agency for International Development (USAID), which was not a branch of the CIA. The representative said his country had a law prohibiting the government from engaging in the activities of organizations seeking to change public policy, such as Freedom House. The representative said his country was not immune from criticism from Freedom House, which he said was well documented. The U.S. representative further argued that Freedom House was a human rights organization which sought to represent those who did not have a voice. The representative said he would continue to support NGOs who criticized his government and those of others.

In December 2019, Freedom House, together with four other U.S.-based advocacy groups, was sanctioned by the Chinese government. In August 2020, then Freedom House president Michael Abramowitz, together with the heads of the same four groups and six U.S. Republican lawmakers, were also sanctioned, with the Chinese foreign ministry saying these individuals had "blatantly intervened in Hong Kong affairs, grossly interfered in China's internal affairs, and seriously violated international law and the basic norms of international relations". The leaders of the five organizations saw the sanctioning as a tit-for-tat measure in response to the earlier sanctioning by the U.S. of 11 Hong Kong officials. The latter step had in turn been a reaction to the enactment of the Hong Kong National Security Law at the end of June.

=== Russia ===
Russia, identified by Freedom House as "Not Free", called Freedom House biased and accused the group of serving U.S. interests. Sergei Markov, an MP from the governing United Russia party, called Freedom House a "Russophobic" organization, commenting: "You can listen to everything they say, except when it comes to Russia ... There are many Russophobes there." Christopher Walker, director of studies at Freedom House, posited that Freedom House made its evaluations based on objective criteria explained on the organization's website, and denied that it had a pro-U.S. agenda, saying: "If you look closely at the 193 countries that we evaluate, you'll find that we criticize what are often considered strategic allies of the United States."

In May 2024, Russian authorities declared Freedom House an "undesirable organization".

=== Uzbekistan ===
Craig Murray, the British ambassador to Uzbekistan from 2002 to 2004, wrote that the executive director of Freedom House told him in 2003 that the group decided to back off from its efforts to spotlight human rights abuses in Uzbekistan, because some Republican board members (in Murray's words) "expressed concern that Freedom House was failing to keep in sight the need to promote freedom in the widest sense, by giving full support to U.S. and coalition forces". Human rights abuses in Uzbekistan at the time included the killing of prisoners by "immersion in boiling liquid", and by strapping on a gas mask and blocking the filters, Murray reported. Jennifer Windsor, the executive director of Freedom House in 2003, replied that Murray's "characterization of our conversation is an inexplicable misrepresentation not only of what was said at that meeting, but of Freedom House's record in Uzbekistan ... Freedom House has been a consistent and harsh critic of the human rights situation in Uzbekistan, as clearly demonstrated in press releases and in our annual assessments of that country".

=== American conservatives ===
In the 2010s, a number of American conservatives and conservative institutions have accused Freedom House of anti-conservative shift in the organization; the organization has been criticized as being biased against conservative governments and the policies they enact, and has also been accused of favoring progressive and left-wing ideas in its ranking system. It has also been criticized for a perceived shift to an activist mindset; a 2018 article in the National Review described it as having "changed dramatically since its anti-Communist days during the Cold War" and having "become simply another progressive, anti-conservative (and overwhelmingly government-dependent) NGO". Another National Review article criticized Freedom House for characterizing what the writers viewed as differences in policy as anti-democratic and for using what they regarded as "partisan" rather than objective measures of democracy.

=== Vietnam ===
As Vietnam is a one-party socialist state, it is a frequent target for criticism and accusations from Freedom House, resulting in strong responses and criticism made by Vietnamese media against the organization.

The section about Vietnam in Freedom on the Net publication is criticized by Vietnamese state media, as Freedom House accuses Vietnam to not have Internet freedom in this publication.

== See also ==
- Democracy indices
- Human Development Index
- International Republican Institute
- List of freedom indices
- Negative and positive rights
