= T. H. Tetens =

Friedrich Tete Harens Tetens (T. H. Tetens) was a German journalist and writer. He was born in Berlin in 1899 and imprisoned in Oranienburg concentration camp (1933) before emigrating to Switzerland (1934), Argentina (1936) and finally the United States (1939). He died in 1976.

Over his career he wrote extensively on subjects related to Nazi Germany and National Socialism. An early advocate of 'harsh peace', he joined the Society for the Prevention of World War III early in 1944, before the leaking of the Morgenthau Plan. Opening with a relating of the Zind Affair, The New Germany and the Old Nazis (1961) decries a superficial denazification and inadequate reparations, and attacks Adenauer: the last chapter repeats the thesis of Germany Plots with the Kremlin (1953), that a rearmed West Germany would not be a reliable NATO ally and would instead play the two superpowers against each another. This was his last book, though Tetens would live to see the Frankfurt Auschwitz trials of the mid-60's and Brandt's 1969 election and visit to Israel.

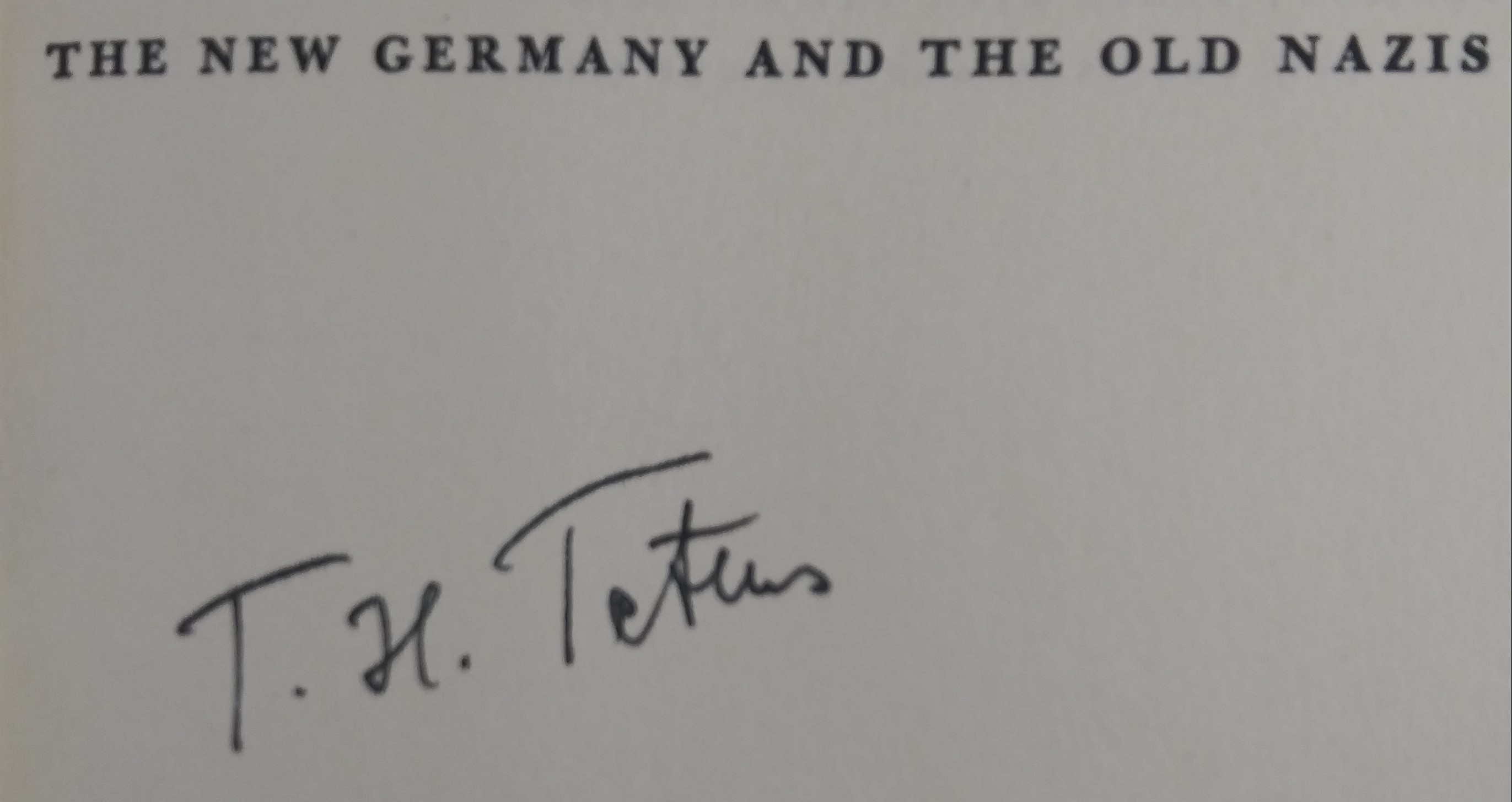
Tetens' signature in a copy of The New Germany and the Old Nazis

== Bibliography ==
- Hitlers "Mein Kampf", serially in 10 issues of the Basel National-Zeitung, 1935
- Know Your Enemy, with preface by Emil Ludwig; introduction by Rudolph Fluegge, New York, Society for the Prevention of World War III, inc. [1944]
- Germany Plots with the Kremlin, Henry Schuman publ, New York, 1953. LCCN 53-7200.
- The New Germany and the Old Nazis, Random House/Marzani+Munsel, New York, 1961. LCCN 61-7240.

== See also ==
- History of Germany (1945–1990)
- Allied-occupied Germany
- Germany–Israel relations
