= Rex Stout =

American writer (1886–1975)

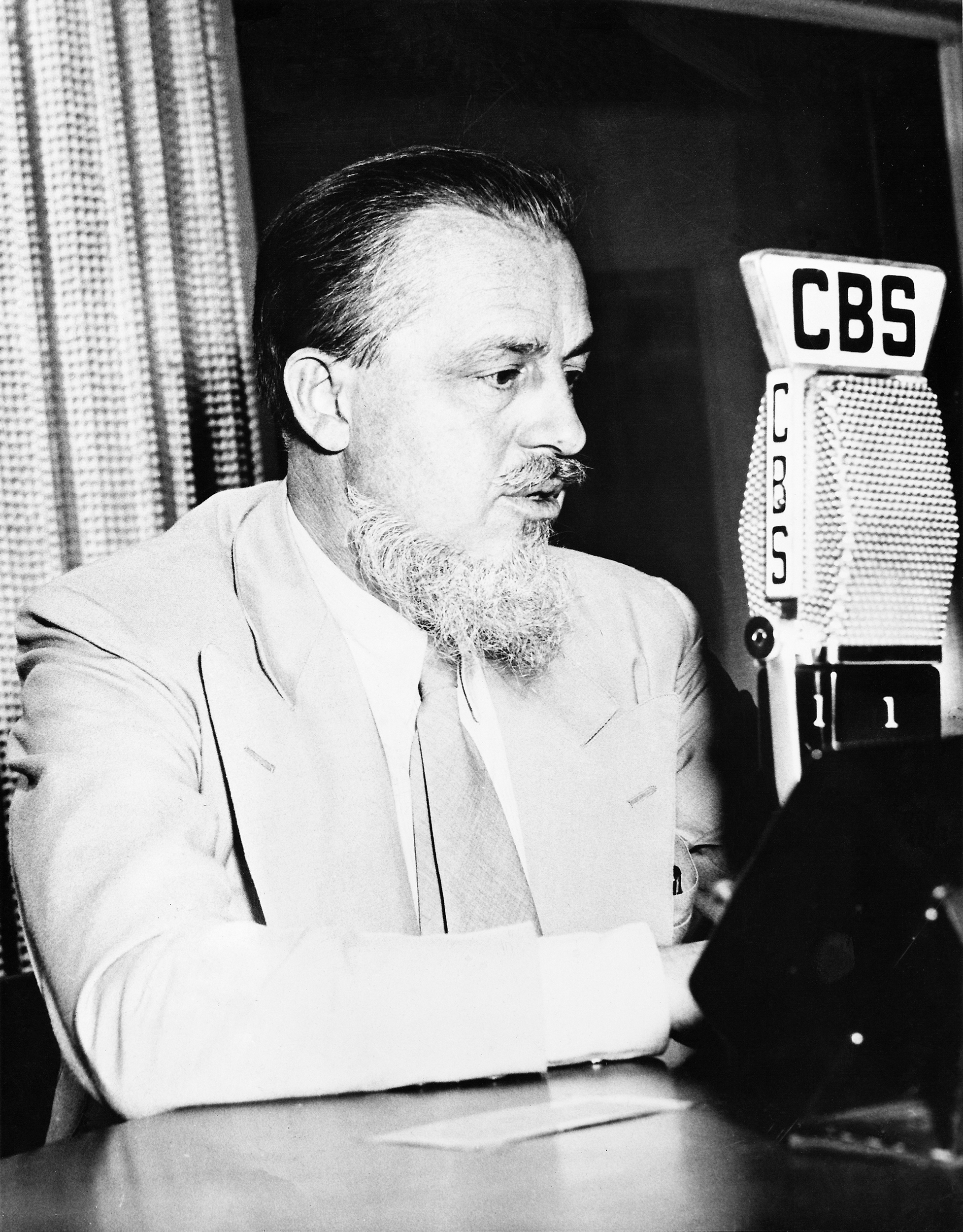
- Stout on Our Secret Weapon (December 1942)
- Born: Rex Todhunter Stout; December 1, 1886; Noblesville, Indiana, U.S.
- Died: October 27, 1975 (aged 88); Danbury, Connecticut, U.S.
- Occupation: Writer
- Spouses: Fay Kennedy (m. 1916; div. 1932) Pola Weinbach Hoffmann (m. 1932)
- Children: 2
- Writing career
- Genre: Detective fiction
- Notable works: Nero Wolfe corpus 1934–1975
- Military career
- Branch: United States Navy
- Service years: 1906–1908

Rex Todhunter Stout (/staʊt/; December 1, 1886 – October 27, 1975) was an American writer noted for his detective fiction. His best-known characters are the detective Nero Wolfe and his assistant Archie Goodwin, who were featured in 33 novels and 39 novellas or short stories between 1934 and 1975, starting with Fer-de-Lance (1934).

In 1959, Stout received the Mystery Writers of America's Grand Master Award. The Nero Wolfe corpus was nominated Best Mystery Series of the Century at Bouchercon XXXI, the world's largest mystery convention, and Rex Stout was nominated as Best Mystery Writer of the Century.

In addition to writing fiction, Stout was a prominent public intellectual for decades. Stout was active in the early years of the American Civil Liberties Union and a founder of the Vanguard Press. He served as head of the Writers' War Board during World War II, became a radio celebrity through his numerous broadcasts, and was later active in promoting world federalism. He was the long-time president of the Authors Guild and sought to benefit authors by lobbying for improvement of authors' rights under the copyright laws. He also served a term as president of the Mystery Writers of America in 1958.

== Biography ==
=== Early life ===
Stout was born in Noblesville, Indiana, in 1886, but shortly afterwards his Quaker parents John Wallace Stout and Lucetta Elizabeth Todhunter Stout moved their family (nine children in all) to Kansas.

His father was a teacher who encouraged his son to read, leading to Rex's having read the entire Bible twice by the age of four. At age thirteen he was the state spelling bee champion. Stout attended Topeka High School, Kansas, and the University of Kansas, Lawrence. His sister, Ruth Stout, also became an author, writing several books on no-work gardening and some social commentaries.

Stout served in the U.S. Navy from 1906 to 1908 (including service as a yeoman on Theodore Roosevelt's presidential yacht) and then spent about the next four years working at a series of jobs in six states, including cigar-store clerk.

In 1910–11, Stout sold three short poems to the literary magazine The Smart Set. Between 1912 and 1918, he published more than forty works of fiction in various magazines, ranging from literary publications such as Smith's Magazine and Lippincott's Monthly Magazine to pulp magazines like the All-Story Weekly.

Stout invented a school banking system around 1916, which he promoted with his brother Robert. About 400 U.S. schools adopted his system for keeping track of the money that school children saved in accounts at school. Royalties from this work provided Stout with enough money to travel in Europe extensively during the 1920s.

In 1916, Stout married Fay Kennedy of Topeka, Kansas. They divorced in February 1932 and, in December 1932, Stout married Pola Weinbach Hoffmann, a designer who had studied with Josef Hoffmann in Vienna. (Note: Born in Stryj, Poland, Pola Weinbach Hoffmann Stout (1902–1984) studied at the Vienna School of Design. She and her first husband, Wolfgang Hoffmann—son of the famous architect and Wiener Werkstätte co-founder Josef Hoffmann—were a prominent design team when they emigrated to the United States in 1925.) (Note: Pola Stout was an influential textile designer after her second marriage.)

== Writings ==
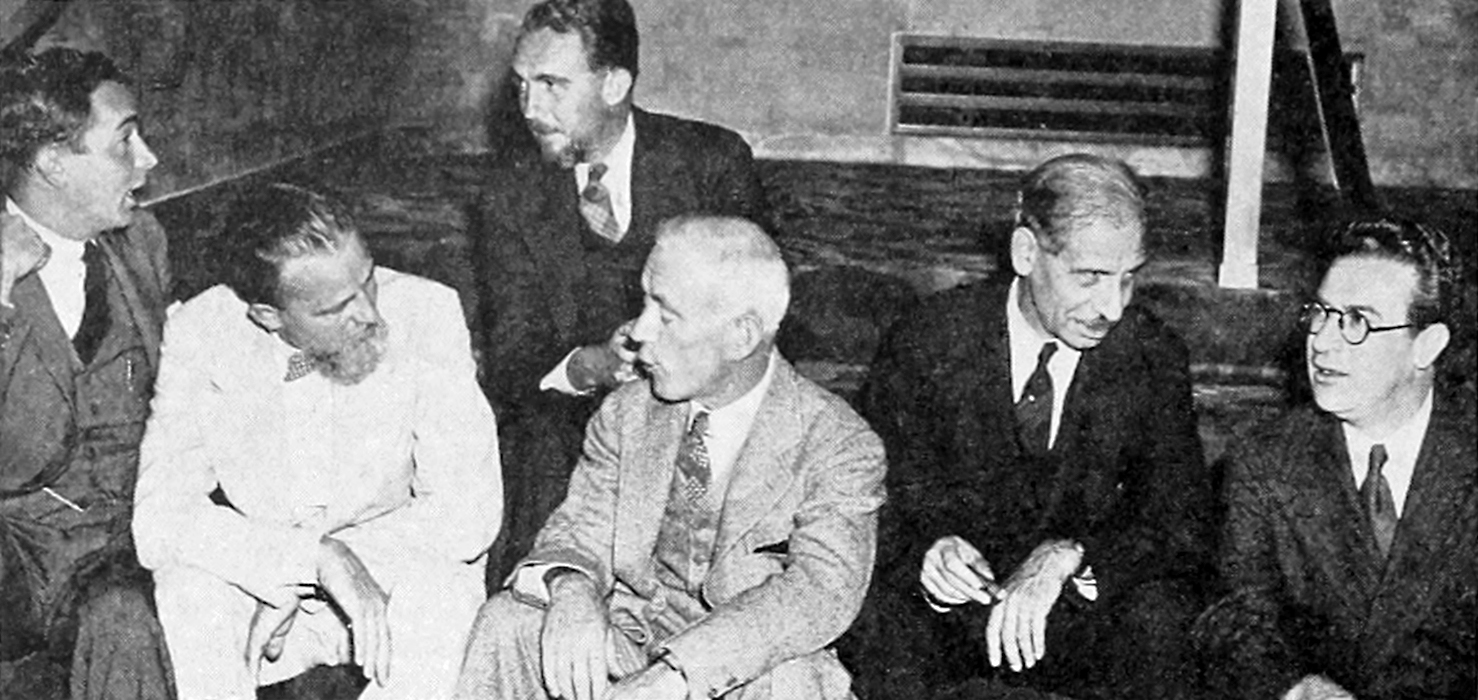
A frequent guest panelist on the NBC radio series Information Please, Stout was featured in the first of 18 RKO-Pathé short film versions that screened in American theaters. Sitting on the steps of the Radio City Music Hall lobby after the September 1939 premiere are (from left) Pathé chief Frederic Ullman Jr., Stout, director Frank P. Donovan, John Kieran, Franklin P. Adams and Dan Golenpaul, creator of the radio program.

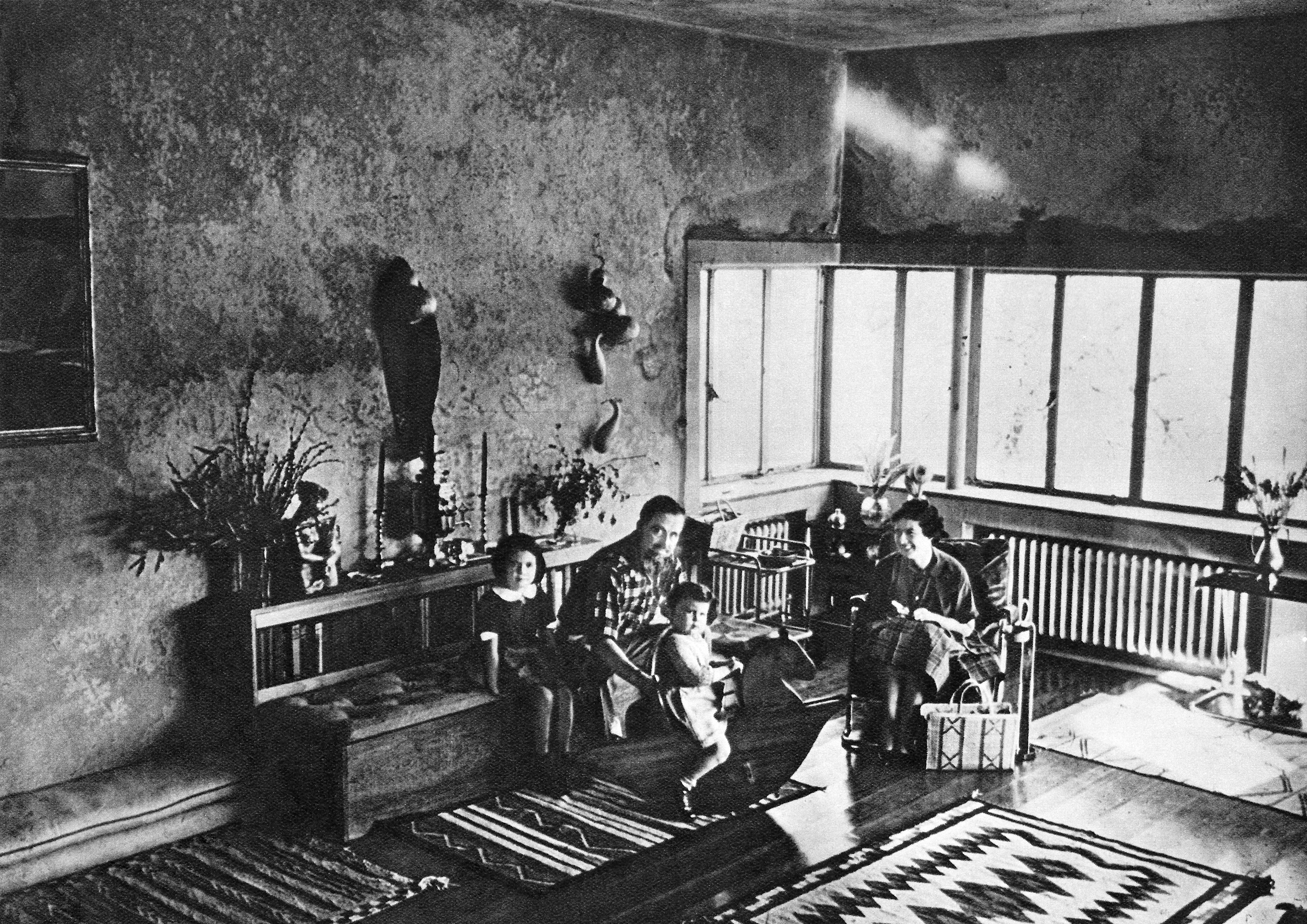
The Stout family at High Meadow, "The House That Nero Wolfe Built" (Look, February 13, 1940)

Rex Stout began his literary career in the 1910s writing for magazines, particularly pulp magazines, writing more than 40 stories that appeared between 1912 and 1918. Stout's early stories appeared most frequently in All-Story Magazine and its affiliates, but he was also published in magazines as varied as Smith's Magazine, Lippincott's Monthly Magazine, Short Stories, The Smart Set, Young's Magazine, and Golfers Magazine. The early stories spanned genres including romance, adventure, science fiction/fantasy, and detective fiction, including two murder mystery novellas ("Justice Ends at Home" and The Last Drive) that prefigured elements of the Wolfe stories.

By 1916, Stout grew tired of writing a story whenever he needed money. He decided to stop writing until he had made enough money to support himself through other means, so he would be able to write when and as he pleased. He wrote no fiction for more than a decade, until the late 1920s, when he had saved substantial money through his school banking system. Ironically, just as Stout was starting to write fiction again, he lost most of the money that he had made as a businessman in the Great Depression of 1929.

In 1929, Stout wrote his first published book, How Like a God, an unusual psychological story written in the second person. The novel was published by the Vanguard Press, which he had helped to found. Stout published a total of four psychological novels between 1929 and 1933, the first three with Vanguard and the fourth at Farrar & Rinehart, to which he was recruited by editor John C. Farrar.

In the 1930s, Stout turned to writing detective fiction, a genre that he and Farrar thought might be more financially rewarding than his previous novels. In 1933, he wrote Fer-de-Lance, which introduced Nero Wolfe and his assistant Archie Goodwin. The novel was published by Farrar & Rinehart in October 1934, and in abridged form as "Point of Death" in The American Magazine (November 1934). The same year, Stout also published a political thriller The President Vanishes (1934), which was originally published anonymously.

Fer-de-Lance was the first of 72 Nero Wolfe stories (33 novels and 39 novellas) that Stout published from 1934 to 1975. Stout continued writing the Nero Wolfe series for the rest of his life. Beginning in 1940, Nero Wolfe began to appear in novellas as well as full-length novels, at the behest of Stout's editors at The American Magazine. Stout wrote at least one Nero Wolfe story every year through 1966. Stout's rate of production declined somewhat after 1966, but he still published four further Nero Wolfe novels prior to his death in 1975, at the age of 88.

The characters of Wolfe and Goodwin are considered among Stout's main contributions to detective fiction. Wolfe was described by reviewer Will Cuppy as "that Falstaff of detectives". (Note: Essays by both Will Cuppy ("How to Read a Whodunit") and Rex Stout ("Watson Was a Woman") appeared in The Art of the Mystery Story: A Collection of Critical Essays, edited by Howard Haycroft (Simon and Schuster, 1946). Cuppy likened Wolfe to Falstaff in 1936, in his review of The Rubber Band. In 1959, Stout's beloved character Hattie Annis stated the comparison to Wolfe himself, immediately after being introduced to him in the novella "Counterfeit for Murder".)

Stout also wrote several non-Wolfe mystery novels during the 1930s, but none approached the success of the Nero Wolfe books. In 1937, Stout's novel The Hand in the Glove introduced the character of Theodolinda "Dol" Bonner, a female private detective who is an early and significant example of the female PI as fictional protagonist. Bonner would also appear as a character in some later Nero Wolfe stories. Stout also created two other detective protagonists, Tecumseh Fox (who appeared in three books) and Alphabet Hicks (one book). His novel Red Threads featured Inspector Cramer, a familiar character from the Wolfe books, working on his own. After 1938, Stout wrote no fiction but mysteries, and after 1941, almost entirely Nero Wolfe stories.

During World War II, Stout cut back on his detective writing to focus on war-related activities. For four years, he chaired the Writers' War Board, which coordinated the volunteer services of American writers to help the war effort. He also joined the Fight for Freedom organization and hosted three weekly radio shows. After the war, in addition to continuing to write the Nero Wolfe books, Stout supported democracy and world government. He served as president of the Authors Guild and of the Mystery Writers of America, which in 1959 presented Stout with its Grand Master Award – the pinnacle of achievement in the mystery field.

Stout was a longtime friend of British humorist P. G. Wodehouse, writer of the Jeeves novels and short stories. Each was a fan of the other's work, and parallels are evident between their characters and techniques. Wodehouse contributed the foreword to Rex Stout: A Biography, John McAleer's Edgar Award-winning 1977 biography of the author (reissued in 2002 as Rex Stout: A Majesty's Life). Wodehouse also mentions Rex Stout in several of his Jeeves books, as both Bertie and his Aunt Dahlia are fans.

=== Public activities ===
In the fall of 1925, Roger Nash Baldwin appointed Rex Stout to the board of the American Civil Liberties Union's powerful National Council on Censorship; Stout served one term. Stout helped start the radical Marxist magazine The New Masses, which succeeded The Masses and The Liberator in 1926. He had been told that the magazine was primarily committed to bringing arts and letters to the masses, but he realized after a few issues "that it was Communist and intended to stay Communist", and he ended his association with it.

Stout was one of the officers and directors of the Vanguard Press, a publishing house established with a grant from the Garland Fund to reprint left-wing classics at an affordable cost and publish new books otherwise deemed "unpublishable" by the commercial press of the day. He served as Vanguard's first president from 1926 to 1928, and continued as vice president until at least 1931. During his tenure, Vanguard issued 150 titles, including seven books by Scott Nearing and three of Stout's own novels—How Like a God (1929), Seed on the Wind (1930), and Golden Remedy (1931).

In 1942, Stout described himself as a "pro-Labor, pro-New Deal, pro-Roosevelt left liberal".

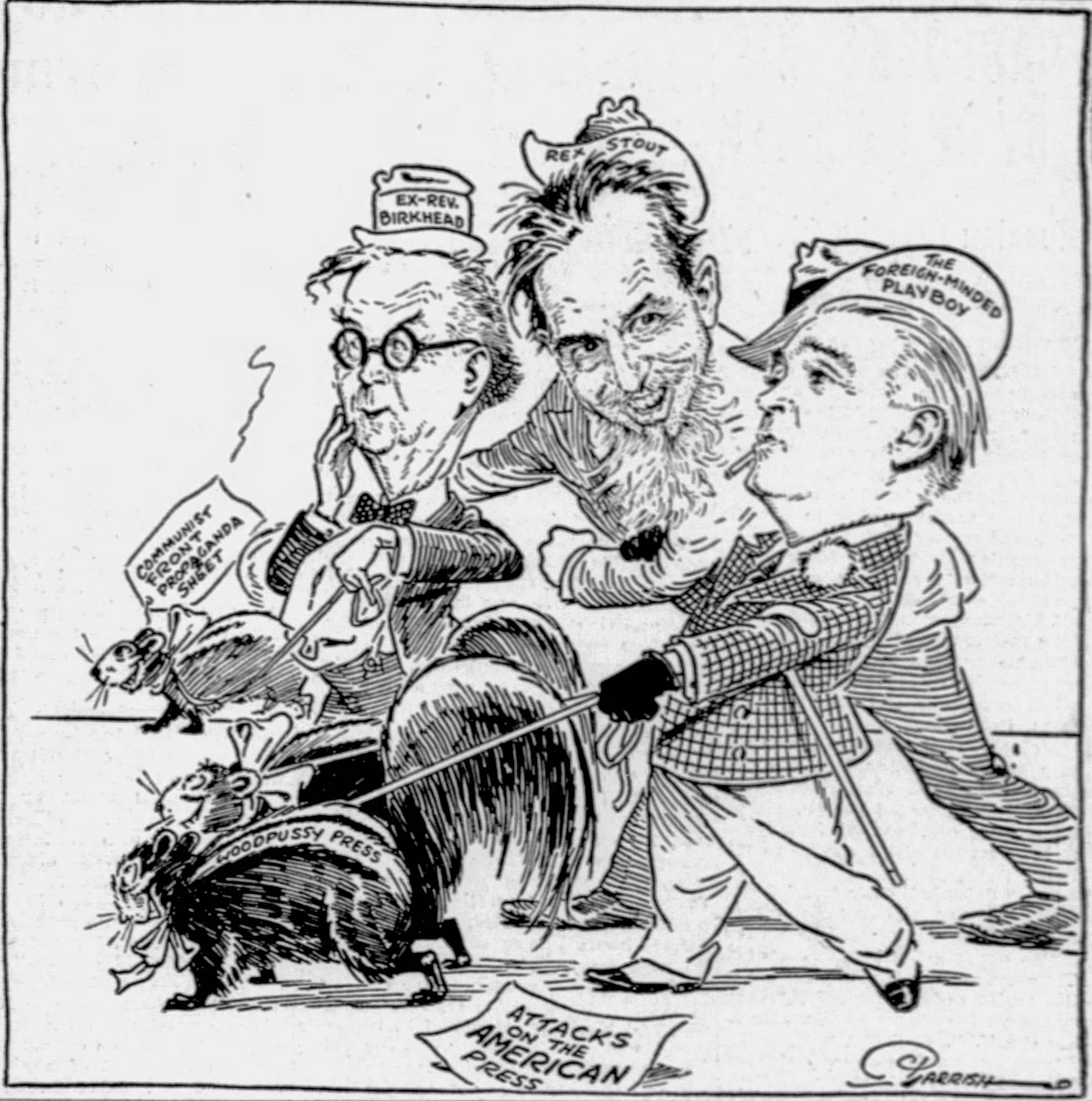
March 1945 political cartoon in the Chicago Tribune attacking "The Foreign Minded Playboy", Stout, president of the Friends of Democracy, and Leon Milton Birkhead, founder and national director of the Friends of Democracy, as communists. Stout and Birkhead had earlier charged that the Tribune was pro-fascist. (Note: Sources differ on whether "The Foreign Minded Playboy" was Roosevelt or Marshall Field III, publisher of the Chicago Sun and PM, which had published Stout and Birkhead's charges.)

During World War II, he worked with the advocacy group Friends of Democracy as president from 1942, chaired the Writers' War Board (a propaganda organization), and supported the embryonic United Nations. He lobbied for Franklin D. Roosevelt to accept a fourth term as president. He developed an extreme anti-German attitude and wrote the provocative essay "We Shall Hate, or We Shall Fail" which generated a flood of protests after its January 1943 publication in The New York Times. The attitude is expressed by Nero Wolfe in the 1942 novella "Not Quite Dead Enough".

On August 9, 1942, Stout conducted the first of 62 wartime broadcasts of Our Secret Weapon on CBS Radio. The idea for the counterpropaganda series had been that of Sue Taylor White, wife of Paul White, the first director of CBS News. Research was done under White's direction. "Hundreds of Axis propaganda broadcasts, beamed not merely to the Allied countries but to neutrals, were sifted weekly", wrote Stout's biographer John McAleer. "Rex himself, for an average of twenty hours a week, pored over the typewritten yellow sheets of accumulated data ... Then, using a dialogue format – Axis commentators making their assertions, and Rex Stout, the lie detective, offering his refutations – he dictated to his secretary the script of the fifteen-minute broadcast." By November 1942, Berlin Radio was reporting that "Rex Stout himself has cut his own production in detective stories from four to one a year and is devoting the entire balance of his time to writing official war propaganda." Newsweek described Stout as "stripping Axis short-wave propaganda down to the barest nonsensicals ... There's no doubt of its success."

In September 1942, Stout defended FDR's policy of sending Japanese-Americans to concentration camps in a debate with the Socialist civil libertarian Norman Thomas. Stout charged "that Japanese-Americans include more fifth columnists than any other comparable group in the United States." When Thomas condemned the military's role as a "disgrace to our democracy" and comparable to "the powers of totalitarian dictators," Stout responded that moving "Japanese-Americans inland hardly constitutes Totalitarianism.".

During the later part of the war and the post-war period, he also led the Society for the Prevention of World War III which lobbied for a harsh peace for Germany. When the war ended, Stout became active in the United World Federalists.

House Committee on Un-American Activities chairman Martin Dies called him a Communist, and Stout is reputed to have said to him, "I hate Communists as much as you do, Martin, but there's one difference between us. I know what a Communist is and you don't."

Stout was one of many American writers closely watched by J. Edgar Hoover's FBI. Hoover considered him an enemy of the bureau and either a Communist or a tool of Communist-dominated groups. Stout's leadership of the Authors League of America during the McCarthy era was particularly irksome to the FBI. About a third of Stout's FBI file is devoted to his 1965 novel The Doorbell Rang. (Note: For more information, see the articles on Where There's a Will and The Doorbell Rang.) (Note: In its April 1976 report, the Church Committee found that The Doorbell Rang is a reason that Rex Stout's name was one of 332 placed on the FBI's "not to contact list", which it cited as evidence of the FBI's political abuse of intelligence information.)

== Later years and death ==
Stout continued writing until just before his death. He died on October 27, 1975, at the age of 88 at his estate, High Meadow, on the New York/Connecticut border. He was survived by his wife Pola, two daughters Barbara Stout and Rebecca Stout Bradbury, two sisters Ruth Stout and Mary Stout, and five grandchildren.

== Reception and influence ==
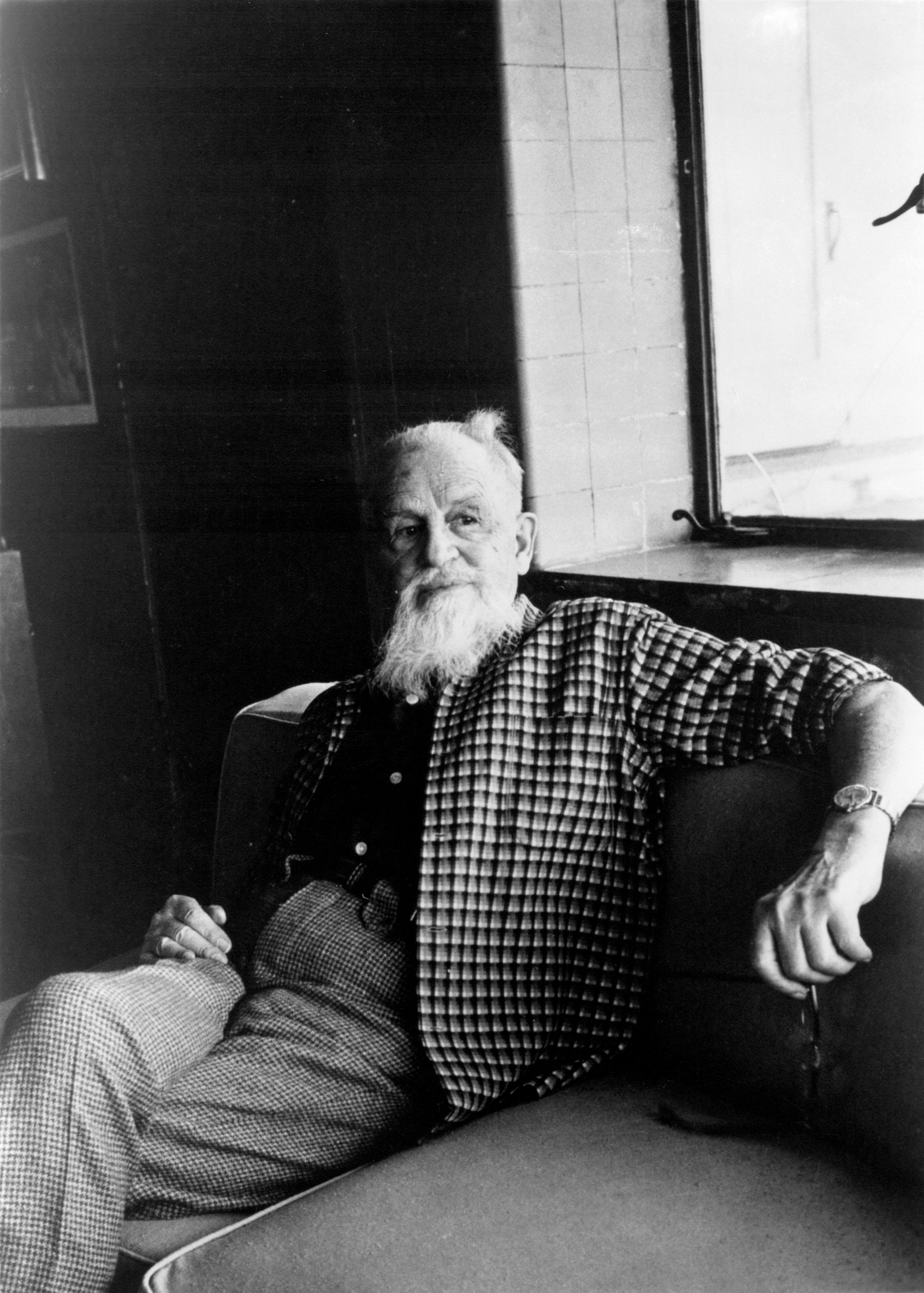
Rex Stout in 1973

If he had done nothing more than to create Archie Goodwin, Rex Stout would deserve the gratitude of whatever assessors watch over the prosperity of American literature. For surely Archie is one of the folk heroes in which the modern American temper can see itself transfigured.

— Jacques Barzun

=== Awards and recognition ===
- In his 1941 work, Murder for Pleasure, crime fiction historian Howard Haycraft included the first two Nero Wolfe novels, Fer-de-Lance and The League of Frightened Men, in his list of the most influential works of mystery fiction.
- In 1958, Rex Stout became the 14th president of the Mystery Writers of America.
- In 1959, Stout received the MWA's prestigious Grand Master Award, which represents the pinnacle of achievement in the mystery field.
- In January 1969, the Crime Writers' Association selected Stout as recipient of its Silver Dagger Award for The Father Hunt, which it named "the best crime novel by a non-British author in 1969."
- The Nero Wolfe corpus was nominated Best Mystery Series of the Century at the Bouchercon XXXI mystery convention, and Rex Stout was nominated Best Mystery Writer of the Century. (Note: The other four nominees for Mystery Writer of the Century at Bouchercon XXXI were Raymond Chandler, Agatha Christie, Dashiell Hammett and Dorothy Sayers. Christie received the award, and Christie's Hercule Poirot was named Best Mystery Series of the Century.)
- In 2014, Rex Stout was selected to the New York State Writers Hall of Fame.

=== Cultural references ===
"A number of the paintings of René Magritte (1898–1967), the internationally famous Belgian painter, are named after titles of books by Rex Stout," wrote Harry Torczyner, Magritte's attorney and friend. (Note: McAleer quotes a letter dated May 24, 1974, that he received from Torczyner, a New York collector who was also Georges Simenon's attorney.) (Note: "We know the importance granted to the words by Magritte in his paintings and we know the impact that literary works such as Poe's, Rex Stout's or Mallarmé's had on him," wrote the Magritte Museum.) "He read Hegel, Heidegger and Sartre, as well as Dashiell Hammett, Rex Stout and Georges Simenon," the Times Higher Education Supplement wrote of Magritte. "Some of his best titles were 'found' in this way." Magritte's 1942 painting Les compagnons de la peur ("The Companions of Fear") bears the title given to The League of Frightened Men (1935) when it was published in France by Gallimard (1939). It is one of Magritte's series of "leaf-bird" paintings, created during the Nazi occupation of Brussels. It depicts a stormy, mountainous landscape in which a cluster of plants has metamorphosed into a group of vigilant owls.

Stout is also mentioned in Ian Fleming's James Bond book On Her Majesty's Secret Service (1963).

=== Rex Stout Archive ===
The archival papers of Rex Stout anchor Boston College's collection of American detective fiction. The Rex Stout papers were donated to the Burns Library by the Stout family in 1980 and includes manuscripts, correspondence, legal papers, personal papers, publishing contracts, photographs, and ephemera. The collection also includes first editions, international editions, and archived reprints of Stout's books, as well as volumes from Stout's personal library.

The comprehensive archive at Burns Library also includes the extensive research files of Stout's official biographer John J. McAleer, the Rex Stout collection of bibliographer Judson C. Sapp, and a collection of Nero Wolfe's magazine appearances donated by Ed Price.

== Select radio credits ==
Date	Network	Length	Series	Detail
February 28, 1939	NBC	30 min.	Information Please	Cast: Clifton Fadiman (host), John Kieran, Franklin P. Adams, Heywood Broun, Rex Stout
March 28, 1939	NBC	30 min.	Information Please	Cast: Clifton Fadiman (host), John Kieran, Franklin P. Adams, Rex Stout, Moss Hart
August 29, 1939	NBC	30 min.	Information Please	Cast: Clifton Fadiman (host), John Kieran, Franklin P. Adams, Rex Stout, Wilfred J. Funk
September 26, 1939	NBC	30 min.	Information Please	Cast: Clifton Fadiman (host), John Kieran, Franklin P. Adams, Rex Stout, Carl Van Doren
September 27, 1940			Democratic Women's Day	Radio address from a dinner sponsored by the Women's National Democratic Club; Speakers: Eleanor Roosevelt, Thornton Wilder, Robert Sherwood, Edna Ferber, Rex Stout, Alice Duer Miller, Dr. Frank Kingdon, Katharine Hepburn, Marc Connelly, Elmer Rice, Frank Sullivan, Henry Curren
April 17, 1941	NBC	15 min.	Speaking of Liberty	Stories of memorable events in the lives of America's founders First of an estimated 29 weekly broadcasts continuing through December 11, 1941, produced in cooperation with the Council for Democracy; Guests include Louis Adamic, Herbert Agar, Pearl S. Buck, Erskine Caldwell, Carl Carmer, Stuart Chase, Frank Craven, Carl Crow, Ève Curie, Max Eastman, Edward Ellsberg, Clifton Fadiman, Louis Fischer, Dorothy Canfield Fisher, Frank Gervasi, Florence Jaffray Harriman, Fannie Hurst, Margaret Leech, Walter Millis, Bertrand Russell, John R. Tunis, Carl Van Doren, Pierre van Paassen, Thornton Wilder, Alexander Woollcott, Lin Yutang; Cast: Rex Stout (host), Milton Cross and others (announcers)
April 18, 1941	NBC	30 min.	Information Please	Cast: Clifton Fadiman (host), John Kieran, Franklin P. Adams, Rex Stout, Henry H. Curran (chief magistrate of Manhattan)
September 26, 1941	NBC	30 min.	Speaking of Books	Discussion of Jan Valtin's Out of the Night, from the 51st annual conference of the New York Library Association; Cast: Irita Van Doren, Lewis Gannett, Rex Stout, Jan Valtin
January 1942	CBS	30 min.	Invitation to Learning	Discussion of The Adventures of Sherlock Holmes; Cast: Mark Van Doren (moderator), Rex Stout, Jacques Barzun, Elmer Davis (Note: Transcript published in The New Invitation to Learning (1942))
April 5, 1942	Blue	15 min.	Behind the Mike	Stout is interviewed by host Graham McNamee
April 8, 1942	WMCA	15 min.	The Voice of Freedom	Broadcasting anonymously, Stout inaugurates this weekly commentary series presented by Freedom House "Program packs plenty of punch … handled expertly by 'Mister X'" (Billboard)
August 9, 1942	CBS	15 min.	Our Secret Weapon	Counterpropaganda series in which "lie detective" Stout rebuts the most entertaining Axis shortwave lies of the week First of 62 weekly broadcasts continuing through October 8, 1943, produced by Paul White for CBS and Freedom House; Cast: Rex Stout, Paul Luther, Guy Repp, Ted Osborne, John Dietz (director)
January 23, 1943	CBS	30 min.	The People's Platform	"Is Germany Incurable?"; Writers' War Board panel discussion marking the tenth anniversary of Adolf Hitler's rise to power Cast: Rex Stout, Alexander Woollcott, Marcia Davenport, Hunter College president George Shuster, Brooklyn College president Harry Gideonse; Woollcott is stricken midway through the broadcast and dies a few hours later
March 30, 1943	Mutual	30 min.	This Is Our Enemy	Series produced by Frank Telford for the United States Office of War Information "Axis Propaganda Methods"; Stout introduces dramatizations that show how the enemy uses propaganda to weaken American morale Cast: Rex Stout, Jackson Beck, Arnold Moss, Charlotte Holland, Irene Hubbard, Lenny Hoffman, Peter Capell, Ian Martin, Bill Martin, Ed Latimer, Ted Jewett, Guy Repp, Nathan Van Cleve (composer, conductor)
April 27, 1943	Mutual	30 min.	This Is Our Enemy	"March to the Gallows"; Stout addresses the audience at the end of a program dramatizing the stories of well-known traitors including Vidkun Quisling
October 13, 1943	WHN	30 min.	Author Meets the Critics	A discussion with John Roy Carlson, author of Under Cover: My Four Years in the Nazi Underworld of America; Cast: Max Lerner, Victor Riesel, Rex Stout
February 2, 1944	WHN	30 min.	Author Meets the Critics	A discussion with Louis Nizer; Cast: John K. M. McCaffrey (host), Russell Hill, Rex Stout
March 5, 1944	ABC	30 min.	Wake Up America	"What Should Be Done With Defeated Germany?"; Debate between Rex Stout and Paul Hagen, (Note: Paul Hagen is the pseudonym adopted by Karl Boromäus Frank, a member of the underground in Nazi Germany) author of Germany After Hitler
October 24, 1944	ABC	30 min.	Wake Up America	"Does Any National Emergency Justify a Fourth Term?"; Rex Stout and commentator Upton Close take questions
March 24, 1945	CBS	30 min.	A Report to the Nation	Program includes an interview with Rex Stout after his return from Europe, where he asked Germans what they thought about democracy Cast: John Daly (host), Richard C. Hottelet, Rex Stout, Brian Aherne, Clare Boothe Luce
1945	Synd	30 min.	Win the Peace	Wartime roundtable discussion about the proposals for a United Nations organization Cast: Edgar Ansel Morra (foreign correspondent), Harry Gideonese, Rex Stout, Virginia Gildersleeve, William Agar (acting president of Freedom House)
December 5, 1946	Mutual	30 min.	Author Meets the Critics	Cast: John K. M. McCaffrey (host), Paul Gallico, Virgilia Peterson, Rex Stout
January 2, 1949	NBC	30 min.	Author Meets the Critics	A discussion of Larks in the Popcorn with guest author H. Allen Smith; Cast: John K. M. McCaffrey (host), Eloise McElhone, Rex Stout
October 12, 1950		30 min.	United World Federalists	Report on the fourth annual meeting of the United World Federalists; Cast: Jean Putnam, Rex Stout, William O. Douglas, Raymond Gram Swing
July 30, 1951	NBC	45 min.	The Eleanor Roosevelt Program	Program includes an interview with Rex Stout
March 11, 1965	WNYC	30 min.	Authors and Critics Gathering	"What do I think about book reviews and book reviewers?" Stout discusses his concerns about the copyright act and asks critics to write about it Cast: Rex Stout (moderator), C. D. B. Bryan, Ralph Ellison, Muriel Resnick, Barbara Tuchman, Edward Albee
February 14, 1966	WNYC	60 min.	Book and Author Luncheon	Program includes Rex Stout discussing The Doorbell Rang; Cast: Maurice Dolbier (host), Helen Hayes, William O. Douglas

== Select television credits ==
Date	Network	Length	Series	Detail
February 16, 1949	ABC	30 min.	Critic at Large	"Are Detective Stories Getting Better or Worse?"; Moderator John Mason Brown; guests Clifton Fadiman, Howard Haycraft, Rex Stout and J. Scott Smart
November 8, 1951	DuMont	30 min.	Crawford Mystery Theatre	"The Case of the Devil's Heart"; Mystery writers and other guests watch a 20-minute filmed episode of the 1947–48 series Public Prosecutor and guess the solution Moderator Warren Hull; guest panelists Rex Stout, Glenn Langan and Betty Buehler
December 9, 1956	ABC	90 min.	Omnibus	"The Fine Art of Murder" (40 minutes) "A homicide as Sir Arthur Conan Doyle, Edgar Allan Poe [and] Rex Stout would variously present it" (Time); Cast: Alistair Cooke (host), Gene Reynolds (Archie Goodwin), Robert Eckles (Nero Wolfe), James Daly (narrator), Dennis Hoey (Arthur Conan Doyle), Felix Munro (Edgar Allan Poe), Herbert Voland (M. Dupin), Jack Sydow, Rex Stout; Writer Sidney Carroll received the 1957 Edgar Award for Best Episode in a TV Series; Episode is in the collection of the Library of Congress (VBE 2397–2398)
February 3, 1957	CBS	60 min.	Odyssey	"The Baker Street Irregulars"; A program devoted to Sherlock Holmes that includes the first look inside The Baker Street Irregulars, with film of the organization's annual dinner January 11, 1957; Includes remarks by Stout, and a dramatization of "The Red Headed League" recorded at a special BSI meeting December 14, 1956, at Cavanagh's Restaurant, New York City; Preserved on kinescope Cast: Charles Collingwood (host), Rex Stout, Richard H. Hoffmann, Edgar W. Smith, Red Smith, Michael Clarke Laurence (Sherlock Holmes), Donald Marye (Wilson), Harry Gresham (Hargreave)
September 16, 1957	CBS	60 min.	Studio One	"First Prize for Murder"; At the annual banquet of the Mystery Writers of America, novelist Nathaniel Arch fails to appear to receive his award. A stranger shows up who is anxious to find the writer, who is suspected of murder. Live drama by Phil Reisman, from an idea by John D. MacDonald; Cast: Darren McGavin (Johnny Quigg), Robert Simon, Barbara O'Neil (Mrs. Cory), Jonathan Harris (Master of Ceremonies), Philip Coolidge (Severns), Colleen Dewhurst, Larry Hagman, Ross Martin; Appearing as themselves are Rex Stout, George Harmon Coxe, Brett Halliday, Frances and Richard Lockridge and Georges Simenon
April 5, 1959	CBS	30 min.	The Last Word	Cast: Bergen Evans (host), Rex Stout, editor Russell Lynes
September 2, 1969	ABC	60 min.	The Dick Cavett Show	Dick Cavett's guests include Rex Stout
1973	WTTW	30 min.	Book Beat	"Book Beat On Tour"; Chicago journalist Robert Cromie records an interview with Stout at his home in Brewster, New York, on April 24, 1973; Program airs on public television stations nationwide beginning in November 1973
