= Society for the Prevention of World War III =

American post-World War II organization

The Society for the Prevention of World War III was an organization set up in the U.S. in 1944 during World War II that advocated a harsh peace for Germany in order to completely remove Germany as a future military threat.

The Organization was a spin-off of the Writers' War Board, with both headed by (anti-German) novelist Rex Stout and the organization's monthly publication mainly republishing material produced by the War Board.

It succeeded in hardening attitudes towards Germany both in the media and in the government. However, by 1948 it had failed in its overall mission, with JCS 1067 rescinded and the Marshall Plan helping West Germany's economic recovery, along with the rest of Europe.

== Activities ==
In addition to the monthly magazine Prevent World War III, the society engaged in a number of lobbying efforts. For example in 1944, they distributed a booklet by T.H. Tetens entitled Know Your Enemy where the German people were depicted as inherently aggressive, militaristic, and a permanent threat to peace. 10,000 free copies were given to Congress, media, and other influential individuals such as clerics.

In March 1947, the society helped Eleanor Roosevelt and Edgar Ansel Mowrer organize a National Conference on the German Problem. The conference was held in the Waldorf Astoria Hotel in New York and was attended by 185 prominent individuals, such as Albert Einstein, Henry Morgenthau Jr., Eugene V. Rostow, Helen Gahagan Douglas. The conference formulated a program to cripple the German economy and reduce the German territory. The resulting declaration, signed by amongst others the society, stated, "Any plans to resurrect the economic and political power of Germany ... [were] dangerous to the security of the world".

== Prominent members ==
- Rex Stout (In charge, also leading the Writers' War Board, government funded and with very close ties to the Roosevelt administration)
- William L. Shirer (Member of board of directors)
- William H. Hale (Member of board of directors)
- Mark Van Doren
- Clifton Fadiman
- Christopher La Farge
- Douglas Freeman
- Friedrich Wilhelm Foerster
- Walter Johnson
- Albert Simard (Secretary)
- Emil Ludwig
- Lewis Mumford
- Allan Nevins
- Louis Nizer
- Quentin Reynolds
- Walter Wanger
- James Warburg
- Darryl Zanuck

== See also ==
- Anti-German sentiment
- Morgenthau Plan
