= Bouchercon XXXI =

2000 mystery and detective fiction convention

- "High Crimes"
- Date: September 7, 2000
- Location: Denver, Colorado
- Country: USA
- Hosted by: Rebecca Bates, Tom Schantz

Bouchercon is an annual convention of creators and devotees of mystery and detective fiction. It is named in honour of writer, reviewer, and editor Anthony Boucher; also the inspiration for the Anthony Awards, which have been issued at the convention since 1986. This page details Bouchercon XXXI and the 15th Anthony Awards ceremony.

== Bouchercon ==
The convention was held September 7–10, 2000, in Denver. The event was chaired by mystery author Rebecca Bates and Tom Schantz, owner of Rue Morgue Press, publishers of mystery fiction.

=== Special guests ===
- Lifetime Achievement award — Jane Langton
- Guest of Honor — Elmore Leonard
- Fan Guest of Honor — Steve Stilwell
- Toastmaster — Val McDermid

== Anthony Awards ==
The following list details the awards distributed at the fifteenth annual Anthony Awards ceremony. The awards this year included celebrating those works which had had the biggest impact during the 20th century as a whole.

=== Novel award ===
Winner:

- Peter Robinson, In a Dry Season

Shortlist:

- Rennie Airth, River of Darkness
- Jan Burke, Bones
- Robert Crais, L.A. Requiem
- Janet Evanovich, High Five

=== First novel award ===
Winner:

- Donna Andrews, Murder with Peacocks

Shortlist:

- Cara Black, Murder in the Marais
- April Henry, Circles of Confusion
- Kris Neri, Revenge of the Gypsy Queen
- Paula Woods, Inner City Blues

=== Paperback original award ===
Winner:

- Laura Lippman, In Big Trouble

Shortlist:

- Robin Burcell, Every Move She Makes
- Tony Dunbar, Lucky Man
- Jose Latour, The Outcast
- Caroline Roe, An Antidote for Avarice

=== Short story award ===
Winner:

- Meg Chittenden, "Noir Lite", from Ellery Queen's Mystery Magazine January 1999

Shortlist:

- Barry Baldwin, "A Bit of a Treat", from Alfred Hitchcock's Mystery Magazine September 1999
- Judy & Bill Crider, "At the Hop", from Till Death Do us Part: ...stories of love, marriage, and murder
- Jeffery Deaver, "Triangle", from Ellery Queen's Mystery Magazine March 1999
- Laurie R. King, "Paleta Man", from Irreconciable Differences

=== Critical / Non-fiction award ===
Winner:

- Willetta L. Heising, Detecting Women (3rd edition)

Shortlist:

- Barbara Davey, The Mystery Review
- George Easter, Deadly Pleasures
- Tom Nolan, Ross MacDonald: a Biography
- Daniel Stashower, Teller of Tales: The Life of Arthur Conan Doyle

=== Novel of the century award ===
Winner:

- Daphne du Maurier, Rebecca

Shortlist:

- Raymond Chandler, The Big Sleep
- Dorothy L. Sayers, Gaudy Night
- Dashiell Hammett, The Maltese Falcon
- Agatha Christie, The Murder of Roger Ackroyd

=== Series of the century award ===
Winner:

- Agatha Christie, Hercule Poirot series

Shortlist:

- Ed McBain, 87th Precinct
- Marcia Muller, Sharon McCone series
- Dorothy L. Sayers, Lord Peter Wimsey series
- Rex Stout, Nero Wolfe series

=== Writer of the century award ===
Winner:

- Agatha Christie

Shortlist:

- Raymond Chandler
- Dashiell Hammett
- Dorothy L. Sayers
- Rex Stout
