= Raymond Gastil =

American social scientist

Raymond Duncan Gastil (December 19, 1931 – December 14, 2010) was an American social scientist, best known for evaluating political freedom in the Freedom in the World reports published by Freedom House.

== Biography ==
Gastil received his BA (social relations, 1953), MA (Middle Eastern Studies, 1956) and PhD (Social Science, 1959) from Harvard University. He was a Fulbright Scholar in Pakistan (1953–4), and taught anthropology and social science at the University of Oregon. He spent seven years as a researcher at the Hudson Institute, analysing national security and other policy issues, and contributed to the institute's 1968 book, Can We Win in Vietnam?. In the early 1970s he worked at the Battelle Memorial Institute. From 1977 to 1988 he was Director of Freedom House's annual survey.

== Books ==
- (co-editor), Can We Win in Vietnam?, Armbruster et al. (Praeger, 1968).
- (co-editor), Why ABM?: Policy issues in the missile defense controversy, Holst and Schneider, eds. (Pergamon, 1969).
- Cultural Regions of the United States, University of Washington Press, 1976
- Social Humanities: Toward an Integrative Discipline of Science and Values (San Francisco: Jossey-Bass, 1977).
- (co-editor), Promoting Democracy: Opportunities and Issues, Goldman and Douglas, eds. (Praeger, 1988).
- (co-editor), Democracy and Development in East Asia: Taiwan, South Korea, and The Philippines, Robinson (ed.) (American Enterprise Institute, 1991).
- Progress: Critical Thinking About Historical Change (Westport: Praeger, 1993).
- (with Barnett Singer), The Pacific Northwest: Growth of a Regional Identity, McFarland, 2010
