= Leo Cherne =

American economist

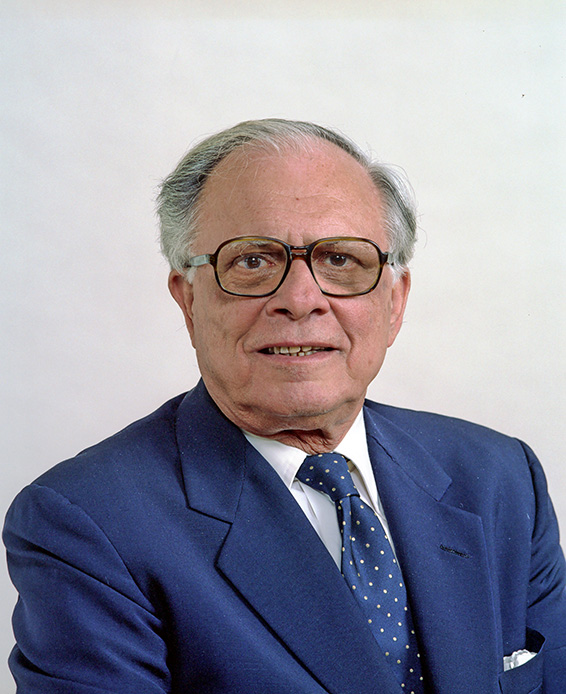

Chair of the President's Intelligence Advisory Board
- In office March 11, 1976 – May 4, 1977
- President: Gerald Ford; Jimmy Carter
- Preceded by: George Anderson
- Succeeded by: Anne Armstrong

Personal details
- Born: September 8, 1912 The Bronx, New York, U.S.
- Died: January 12, 1999 (aged 86) New York City, New York, U.S.
- Party: Democratic
- Education: New York University (BA); New York Law School (LLB)

Leo M. Cherne (September 8, 1912 – January 12, 1999) was an American attorney, economist, and public servant who advised presidents from Franklin D. Roosevelt to George H. W. Bush. He served as chairman of the International Rescue Committee for four decades and was awarded the Presidential Medal of Freedom by President Ronald Reagan in 1984.

== Early life ==
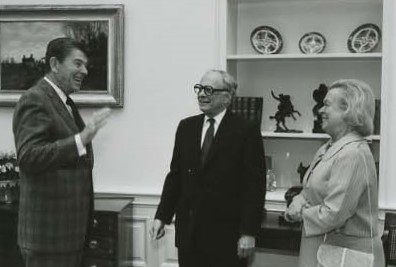
Leo Cherne and his wife meet Ronald Reagan

Cherne was born in New York City in The Bronx on September 8, 1912. His father, Max Cherne, was a Romanian-Jewish compositor who emigrated from Bessarabia to New York in 1904. He attended Morris High School, where he received the Harvard Book Award. Cherne graduated from New York University in 1931 and from New York Law School in 1934.

== Career ==
After graduating, Cherne was hired as a lawyer at Blau, Perlman, Polokov, where he worked until January 1936.

=== Research Institute of America ===
During the implementation of the New Deal, he specialized in Social Security, working with Bible salesman Carl Hovgard to write Social Security Coordinator. This venture grew into the Research Institute of America (RIA), founded to translate complex government legislation for business people. During World War II, he advised the government on industry mobilization; after the war, he advised General Douglas MacArthur on how to reconstruct the economy of Japan.

In 1947, Cherne, as executive secretary of the RIA, had Academy Films make a 30-minute movie called Crossroads for America. It came in response to the pro-union Deadline for Action. Carl Marzani of Union Films had made the 40-minute documentary Deadline for Action on behalf of the United Electrical, Radio and Machine Workers of America (UE). The film "severely criticized powerful corporations such as General Electric and Westinghouse," whose workers the UE had organized. Cherne presented his film at a press conference on 1 October 1947, claiming "Avoidance of another major depression by steadily increasing productivity is the surest means to thwart Communist designs against the American economic and social system." Cherne also claimed that the film showed "methods whereby American business concerns can counteract Communist influence on rank-and-file workers by supplying them with truthful statements."

=== International Rescue Committee (IRC) ===
In 1946, Cherne joined the board of the International Rescue Committee (IRC). In 1956, he personally helped deliver medical supplies over the border during the Hungarian uprising. He went to Cuba in the late 1950s, Cambodia in 1975, and Kenya in 1977. Eventually, Cherne succeeded theologian Reinhold Niebuhr as IRC chairman in 1951. He resigned in 1991.

=== Other activities ===
Although anti-Communist, Cherne challenged US Senator Joseph McCarthy in 1952. He was a member of the anti-Castro organization, the Citizens Committee for a Free Cuba.

Cherne was a public policy expert who became a principal co-anchor of ABC-TV's All-Star News, the first hour-long prime-time nightly network news broadcast, in the 1952–1953 television season. While not a ratings success against entertainment programs on NBC and CBS, All-Star News is credited with pointing the way toward the format later used by long-form local news broadcasts in cities across America in the 1960s and beyond and by CNN and other national and international cable news networks since 1980. Cherne served as chairman of the executive committee of Freedom House, established to advance the struggle for freedom at home and abroad.

Cherne advised presidents by serving as a member of the Foreign Intelligence Advisory Board from 1973 to 1991. He was also a member of the U.S. Select Committee for Western Hemisphere Immigration and the U.S. Advisory Commission on International Educational and Cultural Affairs.

== Personal life and death ==
Cherne was a gifted sculptor. His bust of Albert Schweitzer is displayed in the Smithsonian, his head of Abraham Lincoln in the Cabinet Room of the White House, and his bust of John F. Kennedy is in the National Portrait Gallery.

William F. Buckley Jr. called Cherne "one of the most combative men ever bred... If he thought he was right about something, he would spend from now until doomsday pressing his view."

Leo Cherne died aged 86 on January 12, 1999, in New York.

== Awards ==
- 1971: Cherne received the Golden Plate Award of the American Academy of Achievement.
- 1984: US President Ronald Reagan awarded Cherne the Medal of Freedom for his "moral passion" in the service of refugees.
- 1989: He received the S. Roger Horchow Award for Greatest Public Service by a Private Citizen, an award given out annually by Jefferson Awards.

Government offices
Preceded by George Anderson	Chair of the President's Intelligence Advisory Board; 1976–1977	Vacant Title last held by Anne Armstrong
