= Paul White (journalist) =

American journalist (1902–1955)

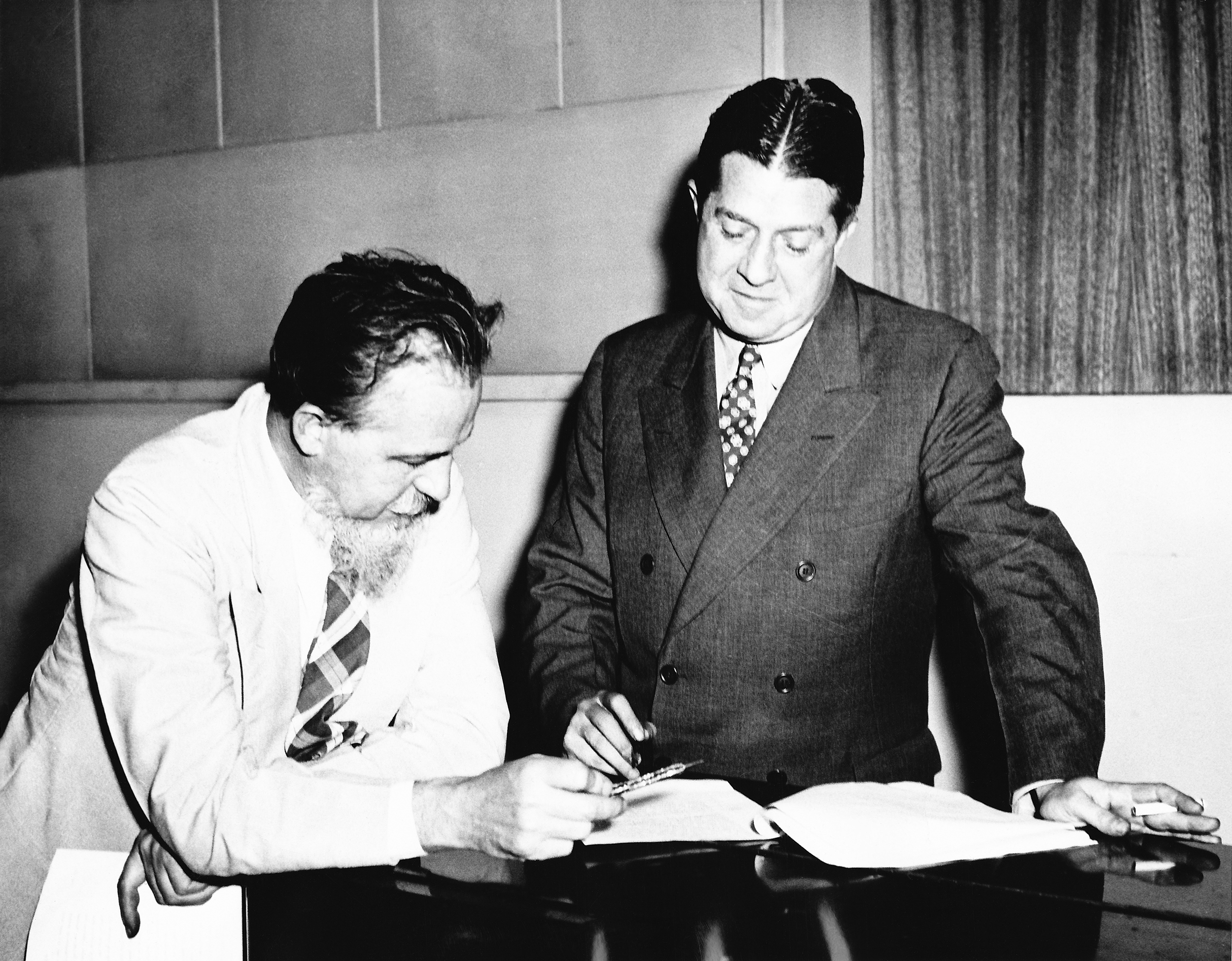
- White (right) and Rex Stout review Nazi propaganda to be exposed on the CBS Radio series Our Secret Weapon (1942)
- Born: Paul Welrose White; June 6, 1902; Pittsburg, Kansas, US
- Died: July 9, 1955 (aged 53); San Diego, California, US
- Education: Columbia University Graduate School of Journalism
- Occupations: Journalist, news director
- Spouse(s): Sue Taylor White (married 1937–?); Margaret Miller White (married 1944–1955)
- Children: 2

Paul Welrose White (June 6, 1902 – July 9, 1955) was an American journalist and news director who founded the Columbia Broadcasting System's news division in 1933 and directed it for 13 years. His leadership spanned World War II and earned a 1945 Peabody Award for CBS Radio. After his departure from CBS in 1946, he wrote a textbook on broadcast journalism, News on the Air (1947). Since 1956, the Radio Television Digital News Association has presented the Paul White Award for lifetime achievement as its highest honor.

== Biography ==
Paul Welrose White was born June 6, 1902, in Pittsburg, Kansas, the son of Paul Welrose White and Anna (Pickard) White. His early newspaper experience included reporting for The Pittsburg Headlight in 1918 and The Salina Journal in 1919, and working as a telegraph editor of The Kansas City Journal in 1920. White studied at the University of Kansas for two years (1920–21), before transferring to Columbia University. He received a Bachelor of Literature degree (1923) and a Master of Science degree (1924) from the Columbia University Graduate School of Journalism. While studying at Columbia, he reported for The New York Evening Bulletin and was a contributor to the New York Sunday World.

White became a correspondent for the United Press, covering stories ranging from the sensational trials of Ruth Snyder, Earl Carroll and the Hall–Mills murder case to the historic flights of Charles Lindbergh, Ruth Elder and Richard E. Byrd. White worked his way up to becoming editor of United Features Syndicate.

In 1929, the Columbia Broadcasting System began making regular radio news broadcasts — five-minute summaries taken from reports from the United Press, one of the three wire services that supplied newspapers with national and international news. In December 1930, CBS chief William S. Paley hired White away from United Press as CBS's news editor. Paley put the radio network's news operation at the same level as entertainment, and authorized White to interrupt programming if events warranted. Along with other networks, CBS chafed at the breaking news embargo imposed upon radio by the wire services, which prevented them from using bulletins until they first appeared in print. CBS disregarded an embargo when it broke the story of the Lindbergh kidnapping in 1932, using live on-the-air reporting. Radio networks scooped print outlets with news of the 1932 presidential election. The American Newspaper Publishers Association retaliated by closing the wire services to radio.

In March 1933, White was named vice president and general manager in charge of news at CBS.

"Paul White was building an organization that would take on an almost legendary reputation," wrote radio historian John Dunning. He organized the Columbia News Service, operating out of Studio Nine in New York, and produced three news broadcasts per day. Creating the radio news service was the suggestion of General Mills, which agreed to pay half the cost. The Dow Jones & Company ticker service was purchased, along with a subscription to an international news agency in London, the Exchange Telegraph. Bureaus were set up in New York, Washington, D.C., Chicago and Los Angeles, and those bureau managers hired part-time correspondents to cover every U.S. city with a population of 50,000 or more. Before long, White was receiving inquiries from small newspapers about whether they could transcribe CBS radio reports and use them in print; and he found a few instances of newspapers doing just that, without attribution.

Within the year, the conventional press wanted to compromise. In December 1933, the Press-Radio Bureau was created — with another set of restrictions that were soon disregarded. "This was the last hurrah in the attempt by the press to control radio news," wrote radio historian John Dunning. "Radio had discovered its own capability."

In 1935, White hired Edward R. Murrow, and sent him to London in 1937 to run CBS Radio's European operation. White led a staff that would come to include Charles Collingwood, William L. Shirer, Eric Sevareid, Bill Downs, John Charles Daly, Joseph C. Harsch Cecil Brown, Elmer Davis, Quincy Howe, H. V. Kaltenborn and Robert Trout. "CBS was getting its ducks in a row for the biggest news story in history, World War II," wrote radio historian John Dunning.

As early as 1940, White embarked upon a collaboration with Edmund Chester under the direct supervision of William S. Paley in the establishment of CBS' La Cadena de las Americas (Network of the Americas), in an effort to offset the proliferation of Nazi propaganda throughout South America during World War II. In the process, he assumed a central role in the establishment of a new broadcast division within CBS consisting of sixty four stations which distributed vital news, music and cultural programming in support of Pan-Americanism for the government's Office of the Coordinator of Inter-American Affairs chaired by Nelson Rockefeller.

White and CBS received a 1945 Peabody Award for Outstanding Reporting of the News. He left CBS in May 1946 to write a textbook, News on the Air (1947), and for health reasons he moved to San Diego, California, in 1947. He accepted the position of associate editor of The San Diego Journal and became news director of KFMB radio and television in 1950. He covered the Republican and Democratic National Conventions in Chicago for CBS in 1952.

White died at his home in San Diego on July 9, 1955, after a long illness.

== News on the Air ==
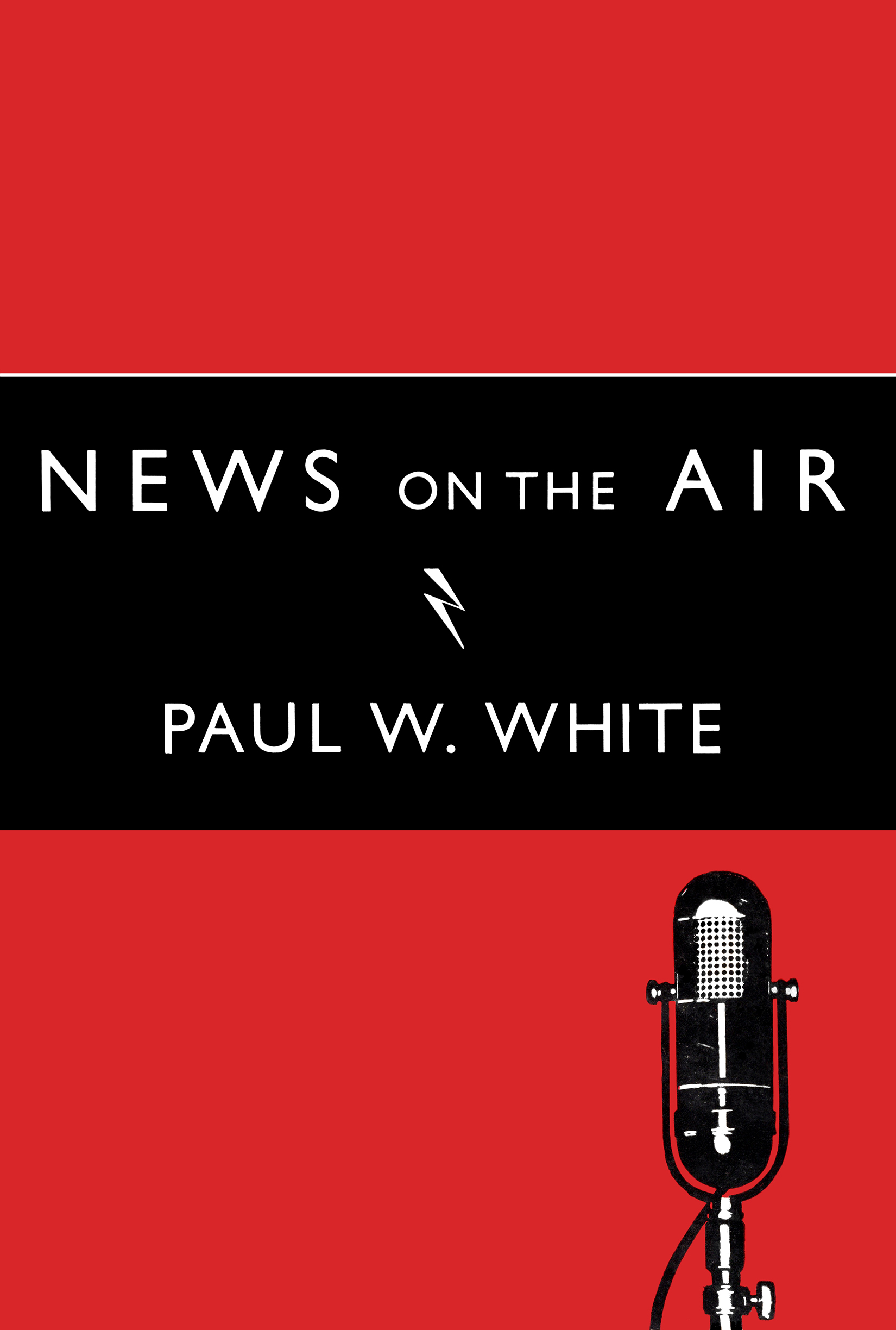
News on the Air (1947)

Published in 1947, White's book News on the Air was still used as a textbook at the time of his death in 1955. Reviewing the book in The New York Times, Jack Gould wrote, "The name Paul W. White probably is not familiar to most radio listeners, but for thirteen years he had a direct and influential hand in regard to the news and opinion which they heard on the air. … Under Mr. White's administration, in fact, the CBS newsroom gained a reputation as the most competent and alert in radio." White's book argues that radio's chief value in journalism was its clear and informal presentation of news, in contrast to the cumbersome style employed by many newspapers.

"Paul White was a teacher as well as a working pro," said Dan Rather, recipient of the Paul White Award in 1997. "He taught Murrow and the Murrow Boys, and he taught at Columbia University from 1939 to 1946. And it's worth noting that Paul White didn't merely practice high standards — he put them in a book, where he hoped that the young — students and professionals — would find them and learn from them. And so he wrote News on the Air. For a long time it was the definitive textbook on broadcast journalism. It influenced three generations of radio and television reporters, including the present generation — and specifically including this reporter, who devoured the book in college."

== Legacy ==
Since 1956, the Radio Television Digital News Association has presented the Paul White Award for lifetime achievement as its highest honor. Recipients include Christiane Amanpour, Tom Brokaw, Pauline Frederick, Charles Gibson, Charles Kuralt, Edward R. Murrow, Dan Rather, Tim Russert, Bob Schieffer, Chris Wallace and Lesley Stahl.

== See also ==
- CBS World News Roundup
- London After Dark
- Our Secret Weapon
- Ed Bliss
- Edward R. Murrow
