= Richard H. Hoffmann =

American psychiatrist

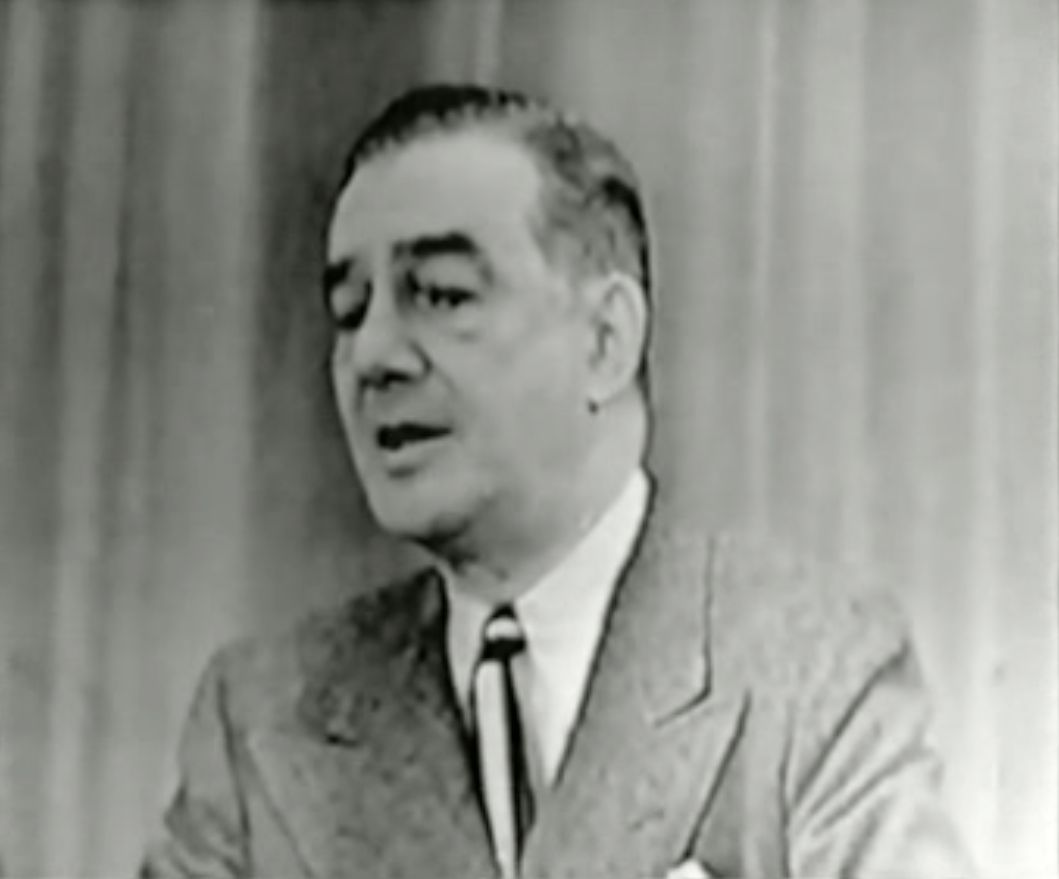
Hoffmann in 1950

Richard Horace Hoffmann (1887–1967) was a New York psychiatrist with a reputation for specializing in the treatment of patients with alcoholism. He was known for treating high-profile patients and was often referred to in the media as a "Park Avenue psychiatrist". Among his more famous patients was F. Scott Fitzgerald.

== Career ==
=== Psychiatric practice ===
Although Hoffmann treated both rich and poor he became known for his high-profile patients and was often referred to in the media as a "Park Avenue psychiatrist". Hoffmann studied psychiatry in Vienna shortly after the turn of the century. He continued as a working psychiatrist into his seventies. In the 1940s, he was psychiatric advisor to the District Attorney of Nassau County. Among the more famous cases on which he consulted were the Creighton-Applegate poison case and the Lindbergh kidnapping. He was a frequent consultant on the stories of the day to the New York city media. Hoffmann's name was often spelled in media accounts of the day, without the double "n", as "Hoffman".

During his work on Winter Carnival in 1939, F. Scott Fitzgerald went on an alcoholic binge and was treated by Hoffmann. Hoffmann had met Scott and Zelda Fitzgerald in Paris in 1925. He admired Scott's writing, knew about his drinking, and said he would do what he could. One afternoon Sheilah Graham came into the room after a session and was dismayed to see that Scott had managed to reverse roles: He was listening to Dr. Hoffmann's problems and happily psychoanalyzing his psychiatrist.

For two years Hoffmann treated underworld crime figure Frank Costello. The news media became aware that Hoffmann was treating Costello after Costello held fundraisers for the Salvation Army which included several judges among the invitees. Hoffmann admitted freely to the press that he was treating Costello and said he had advised the gangster to associate with a better class of people. Angered that Hoffmann had broken doctor-patient confidentiality by speaking publicly of his treatment, Costello severed their relationship saying it was actually he who had helped Hoffmann meet a better class of people.

Once composer Richard Rodgers asked Hoffmann to visit his friend Lorenz Hart who was having problems with alcoholism and who had a strong aversion to being treated by psychiatrists. Hart was in the hospital at the time and Hoffmann said he would visit Hart in the guise of a hospital staff member. At some point, Hoffmann dropped the pretense and began asking Hart questions such as why he liked oversized chairs and offices and if he had a Napoleon complex. Hart rejected Hoffmann's offer of treatment, phoning Rogers to say, "Your witch-doctor was in to see me."

In 1952, Hoffmann was sued by Mrs. Mabel Ingalls, sister of Eleanor Morgan Safterlee, granddaughter of J.P. Morgan, who claimed Hoffmann and attorney Sol A. Rosenblatt manipulated the writing of her sister's will for personal gain. The case received national media attention when the Rosenblatt was wounded in a shooting by an unknown assailant during the course of the trial. The will had left the entire estate, estimated up to $200,000, to Rosenblatt. Media reported witnesses who said that before Safterlee died of cancer she told them she was willing her estate to Rosenblatt so he could ensure Hoffmann receive it. The witness said she was infatuated with Hoffmann, calling him "Dickie boy" and "darling Dick". However, another witness said she didn't want Hoffmann to receive it. Hoffmann and Rosenblatt denied the charges and the presiding judge ruled there was no evidence of undue influence.

In the 1960s, Hoffmann was President of the Institute for Human-Animal Relationship, an organization which promoted the psychological and therapeutic value of pets.

In the 1960s, due to a series of setbacks Hoffmann fell on hard times. After the death of his son from alcoholism, accusations of his using undue influence on a patient for personal gain, his second wife having left him, and the loss of his Park Avenue house, his once-lucrative practice began to decline. He was eventually forced to move from an elegant Park Avenue office to a basement office on the East Side with only his loyal secretary remaining to assist his weakening memory.

=== Media work ===
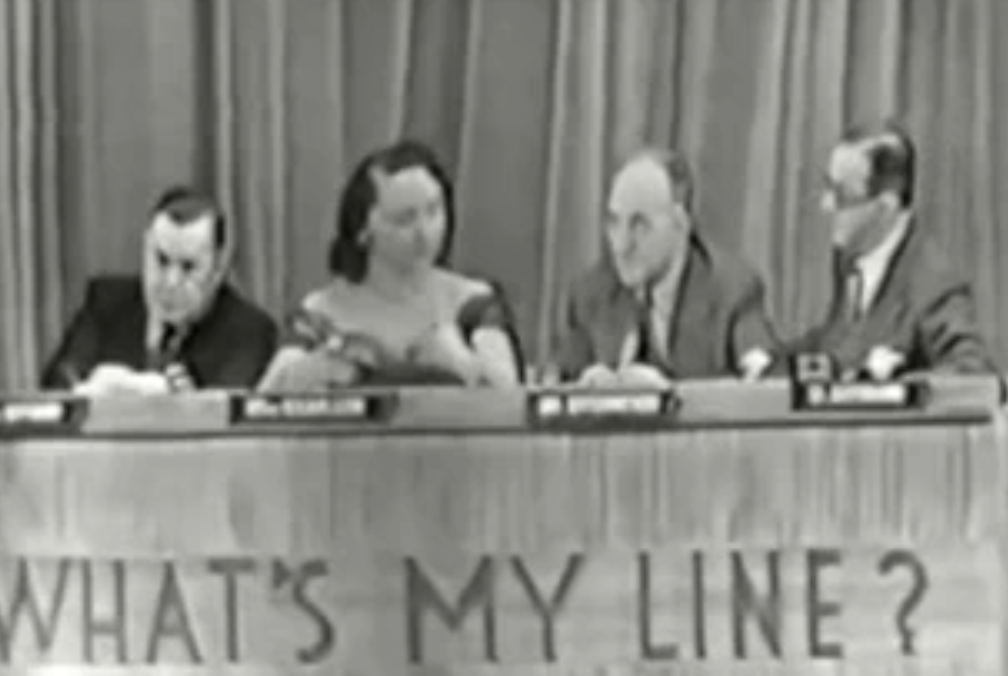
Hoffmann, far right, as an original panelist from the premiere broadcast of the TV game show What's My Line? February 2, 1950

In 1943, Hoffmann was on the radio program Mediation Board.

As a well known and respected psychiatrist, Hoffmann wrote blurbs or introductions to novels of a controversial nature. For example, he did this for Theodore Pratt's pulp fiction novel Tormented, dealing with nymphomania, to legitimize its sexual topics and for more serious novels to avoid censorship issues, such as with Ann Aldrich's lesbian novel We, Too, Must Love.

Hoffmann was a panelist on the TV game show What's My Line? appearing on three episodes early in the show's existence in 1950, including the series premiere on February 2. In 1950, Hoffmann hosted an ABC radio drama providing psychological analysis and insight into the criminal acts depicted. One journalist criticized Hoffmann for "trying to add a little respectability to these little melodramas" and "putting his own profession in disrepute".

In 1954, he appeared in the film Violated as a psychiatrist. The film was described by journalist Dorothy Kilgallen as a "lurid flicker".

== Personal life ==
Hoffmann was born to Dr. E. Franz Hoffmann, psychiatrist, and wife in 1887. Hoffmann graduated from Cornell University in 1908. He was married and divorced twice. His first marriage was to actress Janet Beecher in August, 1919. Hoffmann was close friends with actor Charles Coburn.

Hoffmann was ethnically Jewish, but was an atheist. When asked by a minister if he was an atheist Hoffmann replied, "I don't believe in Him, but I sure hope He believes in me." He died at age 80.

Hoffmann had one son, Richard Jr., who was a decorated bombardier in World War II, but who died as a young man of alcoholism. His son was divorced in 1952 from Christine Dodge Cromwell and they had one son. Cromwell was an heiress to her grandfather, founder of Dodge motor company, and divorced by charging he was only interested in her money. A year later Hoffmann's son remarried to Judith Ann Dexter.

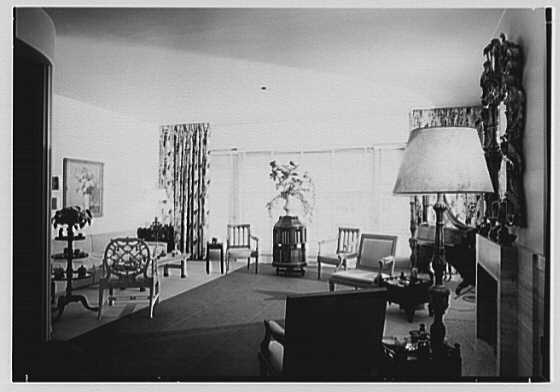
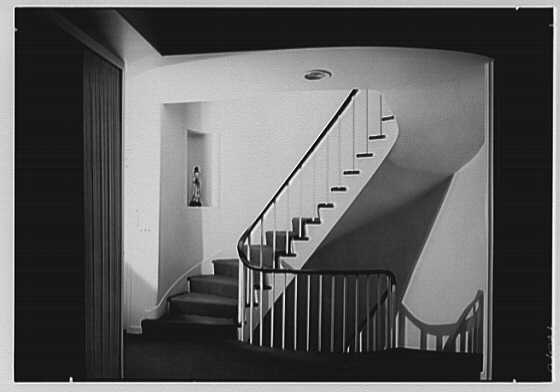
Home of the Hoffmanns at 870 Park Ave. New York, designed by Ely Jacques Kahn in 1942.

In 1942, Hoffmann's residence at 870 Park Avenue, NY was rebuilt in a "art moderne style" by prominent architect Ely Jacques Kahn. In 1946, after a traffic accident actress Gloria Swanson asked that she be taken to Dr. Hoffmann's home instead of the hospital. In the 1960s, Hoffmann divorced and lost his Park Avenue home which was one factor contributing to the decline of his career.

== Books ==
- Hoffmann, Richard H.; Pezet, A.W. Conquest of Tension.
- Hoffmann, Richard H.; Bishop, Jim. Girl in Poison Cottage.
