= Writers' War Board =

United States propaganda organization during World War II

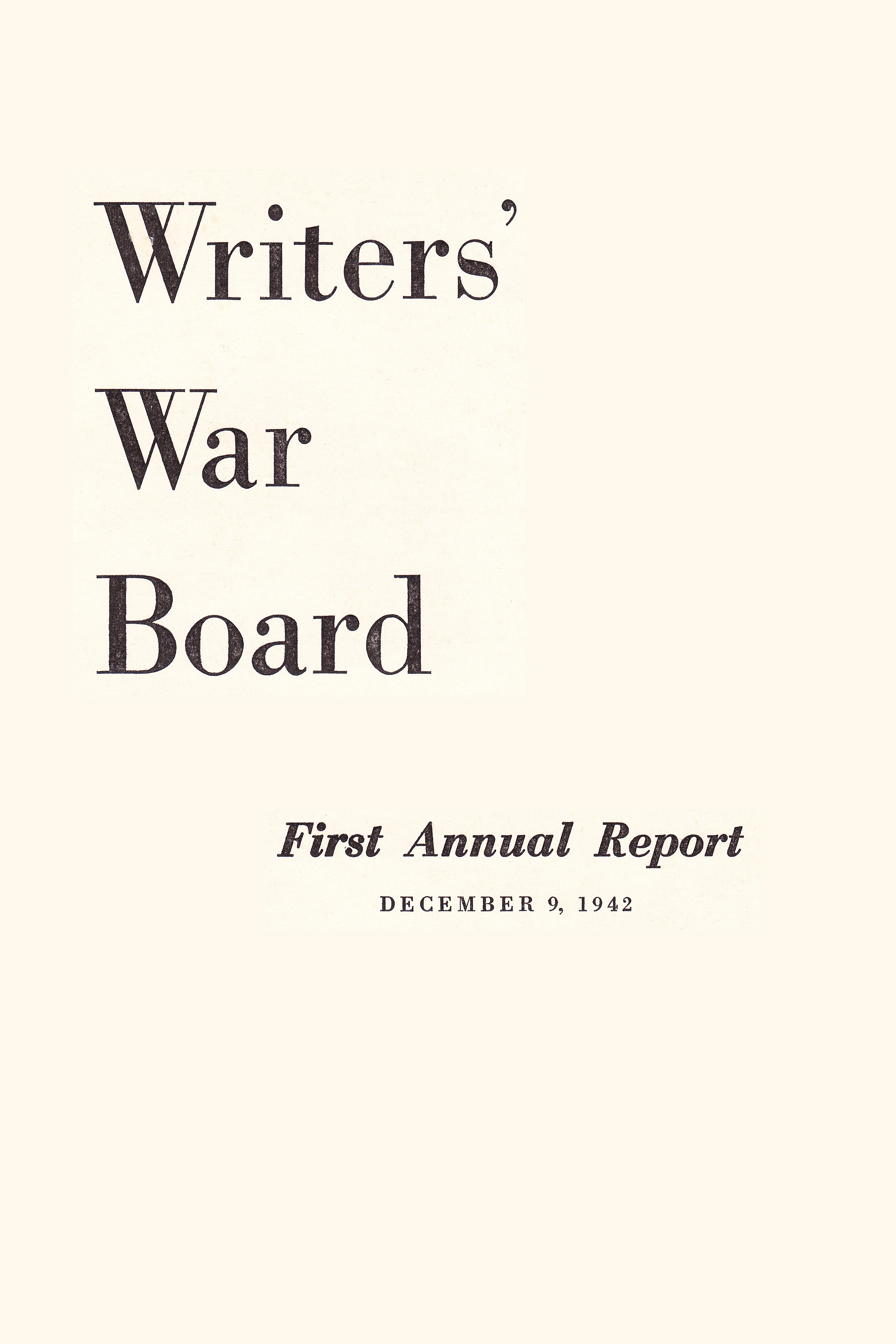
First annual report of the Writers' War Board (December 9, 1942)

The Writers' War Board was the main domestic propaganda organization in the United States during World War II. Privately organized and run, it coordinated American writers with government and quasi-government agencies that needed written work to help win the war. It was established in 1942 by author Rex Stout at the request of the United States Department of the Treasury.

== Background ==
Due to the public skepticism of propaganda due to the heavy-handed efforts of the Committee on Public Information in the US during World War I, and the fascist regimes' propaganda machinery, the U.S. had adopted a "strategy of truth" whereby they would disseminate information but not try to influence the public directly through propaganda. However, seeing the value and need of propaganda, ways were found to circumvent official policy.

The Writers' War Board began its work December 9, 1941, two days after Pearl Harbor, with a speech by author Rex Stout. The civilian organization was formed at the request of Julian Street Jr., head of the writing staff for the U.S. Treasury Department. Street spoke with playwright Howard Lindsay about organizing a group of prominent writers to promote the sale of war bonds. Lindsay spoke with his writing partner, Russel Crouse, and they approached Authors League president Rex Stout, who they felt should lead the group. On January 6, 1942, Stout met with Crouse, Pearl S. Buck, Clifton Fadiman, Oscar Hammerstein II and John P. Marquand, and the Writers' War Committee was formed. The organization soon grew beyond its modest founding mission and it was renamed the Writers' War Board.

== Purposes ==
Initially part of the Section of Volunteer Talents of the Office of Civilian Defense, the Writers' War Board worked through the Office of War Information. Its services were available to all branches of the U.S. government and authorized non-government entities. These quasi-government agencies included the American Red Cross, American Theatre Wing, Army Emergency Relief, Canadian Broadcasting Corporation and United Service Organizations. U.S. government funds subsidized the Writers' War Board offices and clerical staff, but the organization's members were not paid and were free to act independently of government sponsorship.

Its purposes were outlined in its first annual report:

- Serve as liaison between American writers and U.S. government agencies seeking written work that will directly or indirectly help win the war; and place ideas or work submitted to the board with appropriate government agencies. Examples include fiction, articles and songs; radio material for broadcast; speeches and style manuals; scripts for troop shows; radio broadcasts and personal appearances by writers.
- Serve other accredited agencies in the same capacity.
- Initiate and administer enterprises to advance the war effort including creation of radio dramas and efforts to strengthen the embryonic United Nations.

The board processed numerous requests from government departments, assigned work to writers, and negotiated more complex requests. When their writing was used in government publications or on the radio, writers donated their work to the war effort. If the material was used in commercial publications the writers were offered compensation at the customary rates, but many donated a portion of their efforts.

In its first year the Writers' War Board mobilized 2,000 professional writers and produced over 8,000 stories, radio scripts, ideas, slogans, poems, dramatic skits and books.

== Role ==
Although it was a civilian organization, the Writers' War Board was established expressly to promote government policy and received government funding. Originally intended to promote the sales of war bonds, it soon grew into a liaison office between writers and the government. They both responded to official requests and initiated their own campaigns. Many of the writers involved regarded their work as quicker and bolder than governmental efforts. The board compiled files on 4,000 writers, with their regions and fields of expertise.

It worked, according to an employee, as "an arm of the government". And the activities were so extensive that it has been called the "greatest propaganda machine in history".

After Congress restricted the activities of the domestic branch of the Office of War Information in mid-1943, the role and importance of the Writers' War Board increased significantly.

From 1944 until 1948 prominent U.S. policy makers launched a domestic propaganda campaign aimed at convincing the public to agree to a harsh peace for the German people, for example by removing the common view of the German people and the Nazi party as separate entities. The core in this campaign was the Writers' War Board, which was closely associated with the Roosevelt administration. Writers' War Board chairman Rex Stout also led the Society for the Prevention of World War III.

== Membership ==
Rex Stout served as chairman of the Writers' War Board; Frederica Barach was liaison officer for the Office of War Information and executive secretary. Members of the inaugural board and advisory council are listed in the organization's first annual report.

=== Board ===
- Franklin P. Adams
- Sidney Buchman
- George Britt
- Pearl S. Buck
- Henry Fisk Carlton
- Carl Carmer
- Robert T. Colwell
- Russel Crouse
- Elmer Davis
- Samuel Eubanks
- Clifton Fadiman
- Paul Gallico
- Jack Goodman
- Rita Halle Kleeman
- Robert J. Landry
- Margaret Leech
- John P. Marquand
- Katharine Seymour
- William L. Shirer
- Luise Sillcox

=== Advisory Council ===
- Louis Adamic
- Faith Baldwin
- Margaret Culkin Banning
- Stephen Vincent Benét
- Roark Bradford
- Louis Bromfield
- Van Wyck Brooks
- Katharine Brush
- Henry Seidel Canby
- Mary Ellen Chase
- Marc Connelly
- Norman Corwin
- Walter D. Edmonds
- Edna Ferber
- Dorothy Canfield Fisher
- Corey Ford
- Rose Franken
- Lewis Gannett
- John Gunther
- Langston Hughes
- Fannie Hurst
- Marquis James
- Owen Johnson
- John F. Kieran
- Manuel Komroff
- Howard Lindsay
- Edna St. Vincent Millay
- Edward R. Murrow
- Robert Nathan
- Clifford Odets
- Eugene O'Neill
- William Lyon Phelps
- Fletcher Pratt
- Marjorie Kinnan Rawlings
- Quentin Reynolds
- Elmer Rice
- Mary Roberts Rinehart
- Kenneth Roberts
- Frank Sullivan
- Dorothy Thompson
- Carl Van Doren
- Hendrik Willem van Loon
- Walter White
- Thornton Wilder

== Activities ==
The Writers' War Board was organized into specialized groups including the following:

- Army Committee
- Brief Items Committee
- Civilian Programs Committee
- Foreign Writers Committee
- High School Contest Committee,
- Juvenile Writers Committee,
- Library Committee
- Lidice Committee
- Lists Committee
- Lunchtime Follies Committee (with the American Theatre Wing)
- Maritime Commission Committee
- May 10—Book Burning Committee
- Overseas Broadcasts Committee
- Poster Committee
- Pulp Writers Committee
- Radio Committee
- Scripts for Soldier and Sailor Shows Committee
- Speech Writers Committee
- Star-Spangled Banner Committee
- Syndicate Committee
- Treasury Half-Hour Show Committee
- U.S.O. Committee
- U.S.O. Camp Shows Committee
- V-Homes Committee
- War Page Committee
- War Scripts of the Month Committee
- Writers' War Board Radio Talks

The Writers' War Board compiled lists of books banned or burned in Nazi Germany May 10, 1933, and distributed them for propaganda purposes, which aided in the staging of thousands of commemorations of the book burnings. In cooperation with the Council on Books in Wartime, the board's May 10—Book Burning Committee, chaired by publisher Bennett Cerf, coordinated a national commemoration of the ninth anniversary of the book burning in Nazi Germany. A script written for the occasion was presented nationally on NBC radio, and a second script for local use was distributed to 210 radio stations; both scripts were used throughout the war.

== See also ==
- Our Secret Weapon
- Society for the Prevention of World War III
- United States Office of War Information
- American propaganda during World War II
- Propaganda in the United States
- Council on Books in Wartime
