= Catholicon =

Catholicon may refer to:

- Catholicon, the conventual church at the centre of an abbey
- Katholikon, the primary church in an Orthodox or Eastern Catholic monastery
- Catholicon (1286), book written in 1286 by Johannes de Balbis of Genoa (Summa grammaticalis quae vocatur Catholicon)
- Catholicon français, Latin–French version of the Catholicon of 1286
- Catholicon (trilingual dictionary), Breton–Latin–French dictionary written in 1464 by Jehan Lagadeuc and printed in 1499
- Catholicon (electuary), an alleged all-purpose cure (panacea) used in pre-modern medicine

== See also ==
- Catholicos
