= Cordially Invited to Meet Death =

1942 novella by Rex Stout

- Short story by Rex Stout
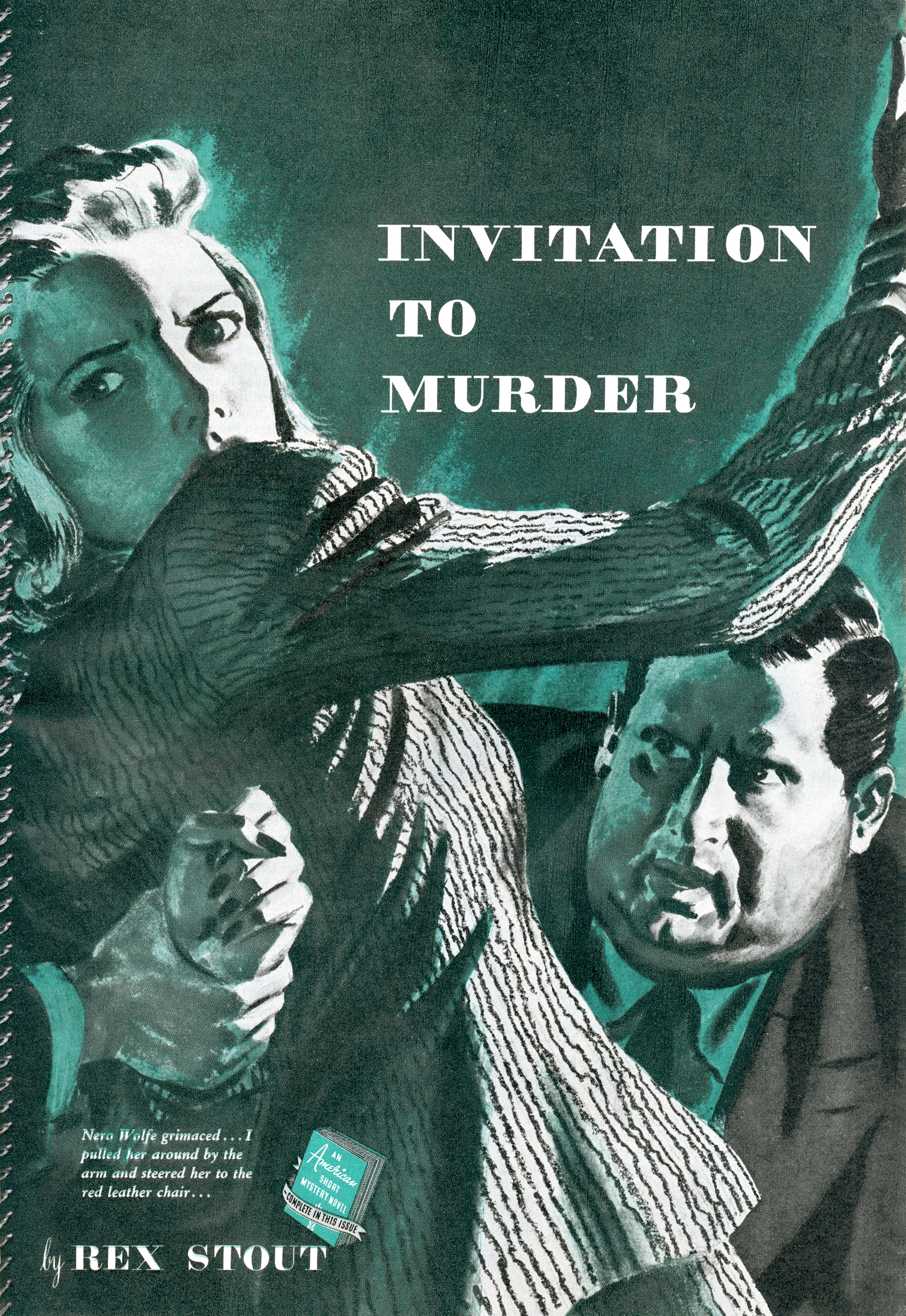
- Illustrated by Fred Ludekens
- Original title: Invitation to Murder
- Country: United States
- Language: English
- Genre: Detective fiction

Publication
- Published in: The American Magazine
- Publication type: Periodical
- Publication date: April 1942
- Series: Nero Wolfe

"Cordially Invited to Meet Death" is a Nero Wolfe mystery novella by Rex Stout, first published in abridged form as "Invitation to Murder" in the April 1942 issue of The American Magazine. It first appeared in book form in the short-story collection Black Orchids, published by Farrar & Rinehart in 1942.

== Plot summary ==
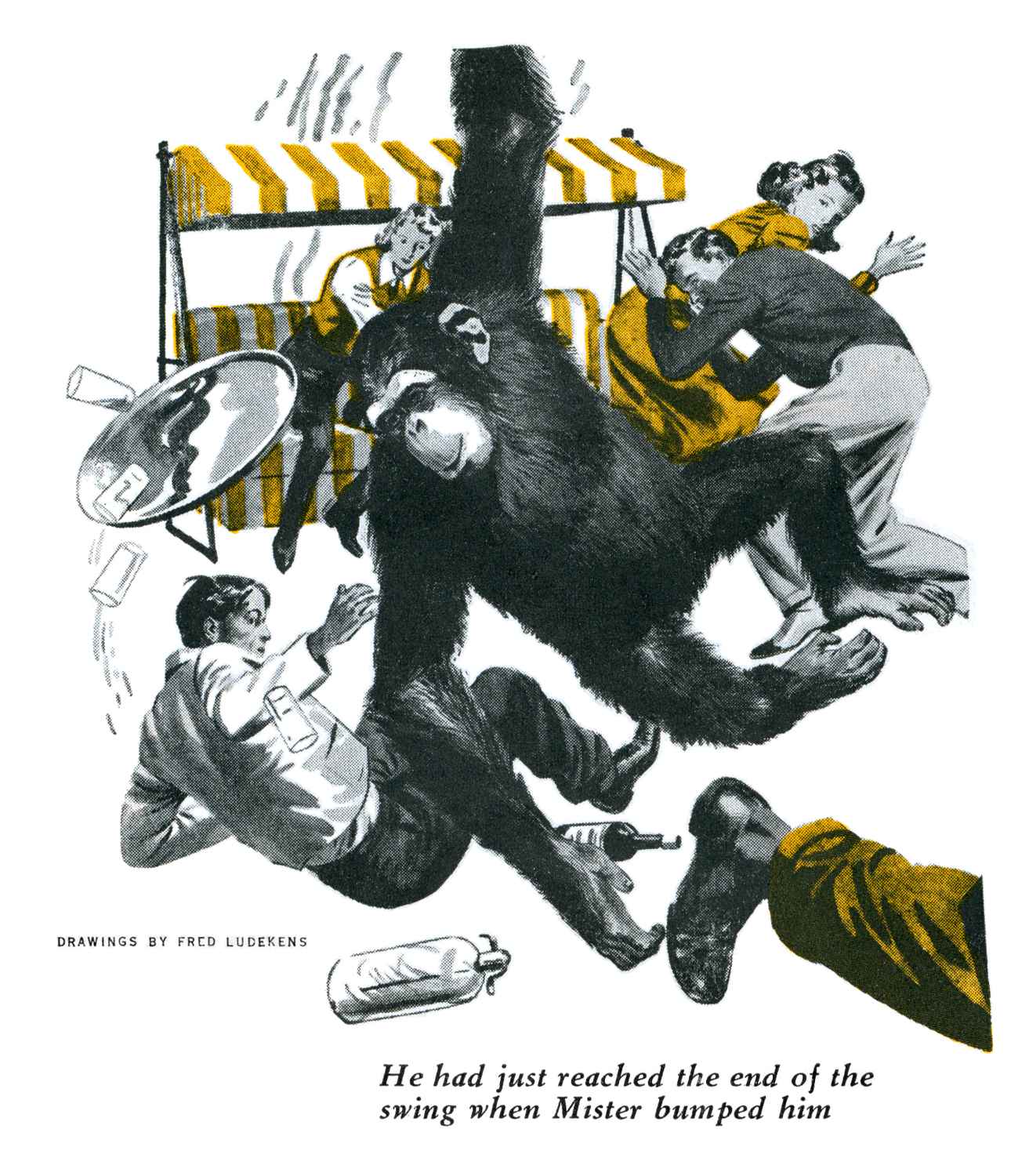
Fred Ludekens illustrated "Invitation to Murder" for The American Magazine (April 1942)

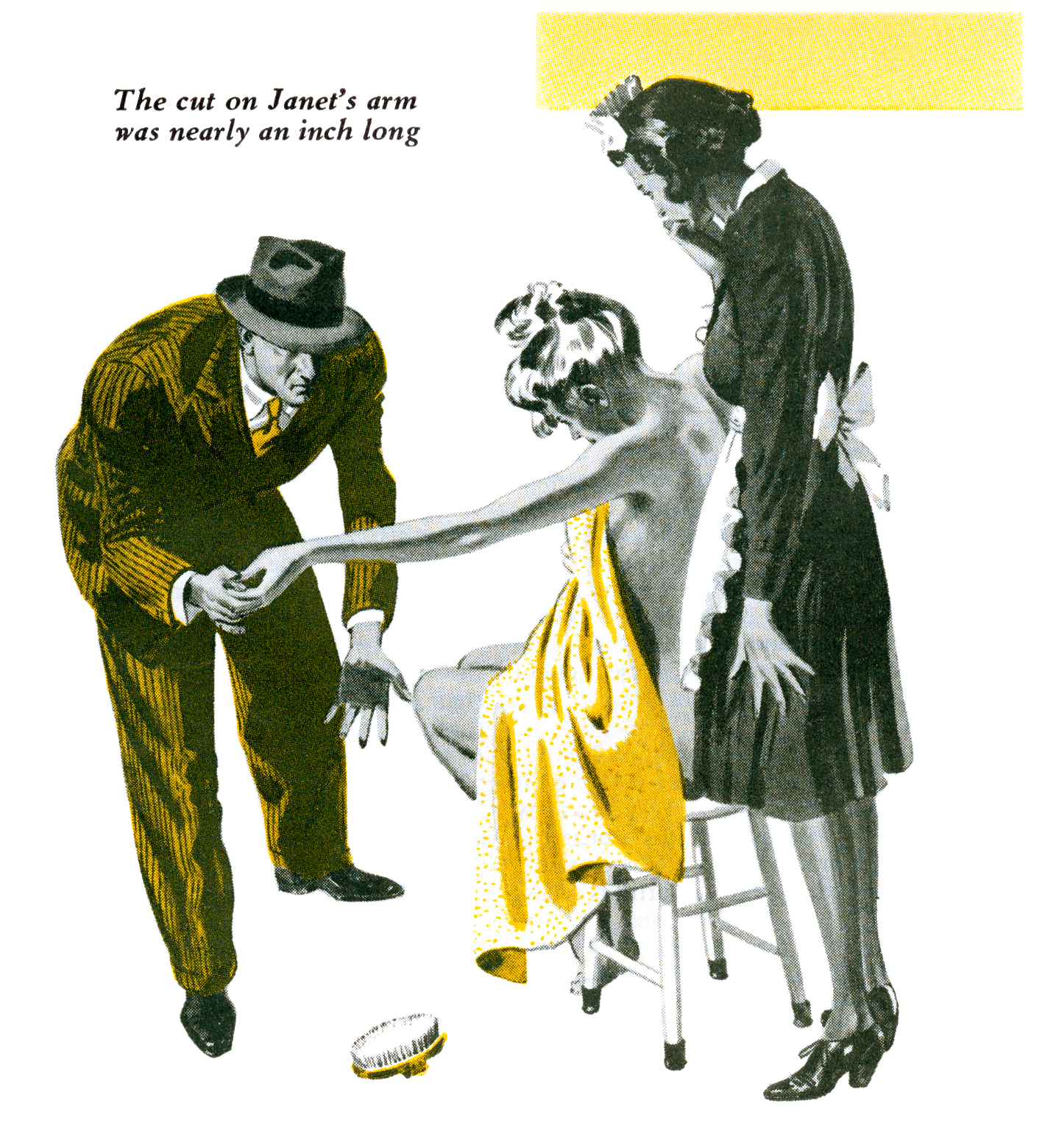
"The cut on Janet's arm was nearly an inch long."

Bess Huddleston, arranger of parties for New York society, asks Nero Wolfe to put an end to a campaign of anonymous letters that imply she has been gossiping about her clients' private lives. She suspects Janet Nichols, her assistant, but does not specify the reason to Wolfe. After Bess leaves, Wolfe summons Janet and Maryella Timms, Bess' secretary, to the office; while Archie reclaims a hexagonally-cut picture of Janet that Bess dropped, swiped by Janet from Archie's desk, Maryella charms Wolfe by helping him and Fritz properly cook corned beef hash.

Apart from the culinary, though, Wolfe obtains no useful information from Nichols and Timms, and sends Archie to Bess' house and place of business to investigate further. After being bedeviled by a playful chimpanzee, Archie meets her brother Daniel, her nephew Larry, and Alan Brady, a doctor who has been spending time with Janet. While those involved are having cocktails on the terrace, the chimpanzee startles the butler, who drops a tray of glasses that crash to the ground and break. Most of the broken glass is cleaned up, but Bess cuts her foot on a shard in her slipper; because of the presence of the animals, Dr. Brady treats the cut with iodine.

Less than one week later, Bess is dead, having undergone an excruciatingly painful and drawn out death from tetanus. That, as far as Wolfe is concerned, ends his involvement, but Daniel Huddleston pesters the police as he believes his sister was murdered. Daniel is insistent enough that Inspector Cramer comes to Wolfe looking for information. Wolfe has none for him, but after Cramer leaves he drops Archie an exiguous hint: he thinks there is one thing that Cramer should have done during his investigation, and wonders if it has rained during the past week.

Archie works out the clue and drives to the Huddlestons' to see if traces of tetanus can be found in the grass between the stones on the terrace, but when he arrives, he finds Daniel cutting the piece of turf out. Archie follows him all the way to Wolfe’s house, where Wolfe agrees to pay to have the samples tested. Daniel later returns with a report showing that the sample on which the chimpanzee poured the bottle contained tetanus germs; the bottle actually contained silver argyrol infected with tetanus. While he is there, however, Inspector Cramer arrives and takes Daniel in for questioning, infuriating Wolfe.

The next day, Janet cuts her arm on a piece of glass wedged in her bath brush, and since she has already treated the small cut with bogus iodine, Archie sends her to Dr. Vollmer to get a shot of antitoxin. Archie and Janet return to Wolfe's office, where Wolfe has already invited the relevant parties in order to reveal the murderer.

Wolfe reveals that the photograph of Janet which Bess had dropped fits in Larry's wristwatch, revealing the two had been lovers. After Larry confirms that Bess forced him to break the engagement, Wolfe identifies Janet as the letter-writer and murderer. She faked the attack on herself in order to divert suspicion, but she made the cut too short; if she had been using her bath brush normally, the cut should have been much longer. Having extracted a confession, Wolfe delivers Janet to Cramer, humiliating the inspector for taking an invited guest from his house by force.

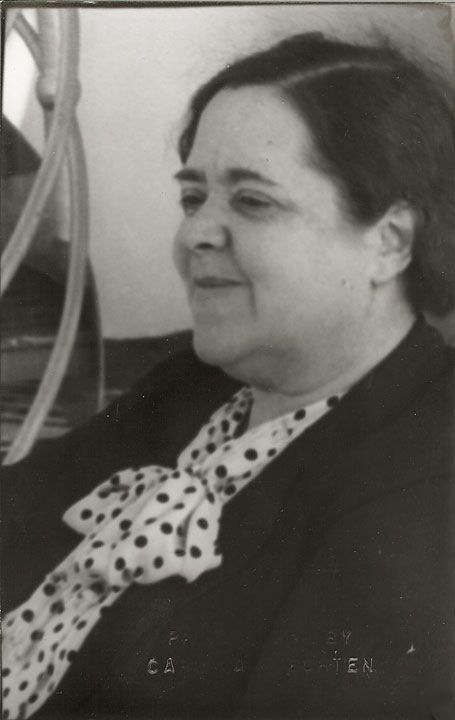
Elsa Maxwell (1883–1963, photograph by Carl Van Vechten) is considered the likely inspiration for Rex Stout's Bess Huddleston.

== Cast of characters ==
- Nero Wolfe — The private investigator
- Archie Goodwin — Wolfe's assistant (and the narrator of all Wolfe stories)
- Bess Huddleston — Party arranger for members of the Social Register
- Mister, Logo, Lulu and Moses — Miss Huddleston's pet chimp, bears and alligator
- Janet Nichols — Miss Huddleston's assistant
- Maryella Timms — Miss Huddleston's secretary
- Daniel Huddleston — A research chemist and Miss Huddleston's brother
- Larry Huddleston — Another assistant party arranger employed by Miss Huddleston, and her nephew
- Alan Brady — A local medical doctor who has become friendly with the Huddleston household
- Inspector Cramer — Representing Manhattan Homicide

== The unfamiliar word ==
In most Nero Wolfe novels and novellas, there is at least one unfamiliar word, usually spoken by Wolfe. "Cordially Invited to Meet Death" contains this word, first spoken by Daniel Huddleston:

- Catholicon. Chapter 7.

== Publication history ==
=== "Cordially Invited to Meet Death" ===
- 1942, The American Magazine, April 1942, as "Invitation to Murder"
- 1943, The Philadelphia Inquirer, a Gold Seal Novel, May 16, 1943, as "Cordially Invited"
- 1944, *New York: Lawrence E. Spivak, Jonathan Press #15, not dated, digest paperback
- 1956, New York: Avon #738 (with Edgar Allan Poe's "Some Words with a Mummy"), 1956, paperback
- New York: Hillman Periodicals, not dated
- 1998, Burlington, Ontario: Durkin Hayes Publishing, DH Audio ISBN 0-88646-472-2 August 1998, audio cassette (unabridged, read by David Elias), "Cordially Invited to Meet Death")

=== Black Orchids ===
- 1942, New York: Farrar & Rinehart, May 21, 1942, hardcover

Contents include "Black Orchids" and "Cordially Invited to Meet Death".
In his limited-edition pamphlet, Collecting Mystery Fiction #9, Rex Stout's Nero Wolfe Part I, Otto Penzler describes the first edition of Black Orchids: "Brick brown cloth, front cover and spine printed with black; rear cover blank. Issued in a brick brown and green pictorial dust wrapper … The first edition has the publisher's monogram logo on the copyright page."
In April 2006, Firsts: The Book Collector's Magazine estimated that the first edition of Black Orchids had a value of between $3,000 and $5,000. The estimate is for a copy in very good to fine condition in a like dustjacket.

- 1942, Toronto: Oxford University Press, 1942, hardcover
- 1942, New York: Detective Book Club #5, August 1942, hardcover
- 1943, London: Collins Crime Club, July 5, 1943, hardcover
- 1943, New York: Grosset & Dunlap, 1943, hardcover
- 1945, Cleveland, Ohio: World Publishing Company, a Tower Book, March 1945, hardcover
- 1946, New York: Avon #95, 1946, paperback
- 1963, New York: Pyramid (Green Door) #R-917, September 1963, paperback
- 1992, New York: Bantam Crimeline ISBN 0-553-25719-6 May 1992, trade paperback
- 1996, Burlington, Ontario: Durkin Hayes Publishing, DH Audio, "Black Orchids" ISBN 0-88646-889-2 December 1996, audio cassette (unabridged, read by Saul Rubinek)
- 1998, Burlington, Ontario: Durkin Hayes Publishing, DH Audio ISBN 0-88646-472-2 August 1998, audio cassette (unabridged, read by David Elias), "Cordially Invited to Meet Death"
- 2009, New York: Bantam Dell Publishing Group (with The Silent Speaker) ISBN 978-0-553-38655-4 August 25, 2009, trade paperback
- 2010, New York: Bantam Crimeline ISBN 0-307-75573-8 June 30, 2010, e-book

== Adaptations ==
=== Nero Wolfe (CBC Radio) ===
"Cordially Invited to Meet Death" was adapted as the sixth episode of the Canadian Broadcasting Corporation's 13-part radio series Nero Wolfe (1982), starring Mavor Moore as Nero Wolfe, Don Francks as Archie Goodwin, and Cec Linder as Inspector Cramer. Written and directed by Toronto actor and producer Ron Hartmann, the hour-long adaptation aired on CBC Stereo February 20, 1982.
