= Black Orchids (novella) =

- Short story by Rex Stout
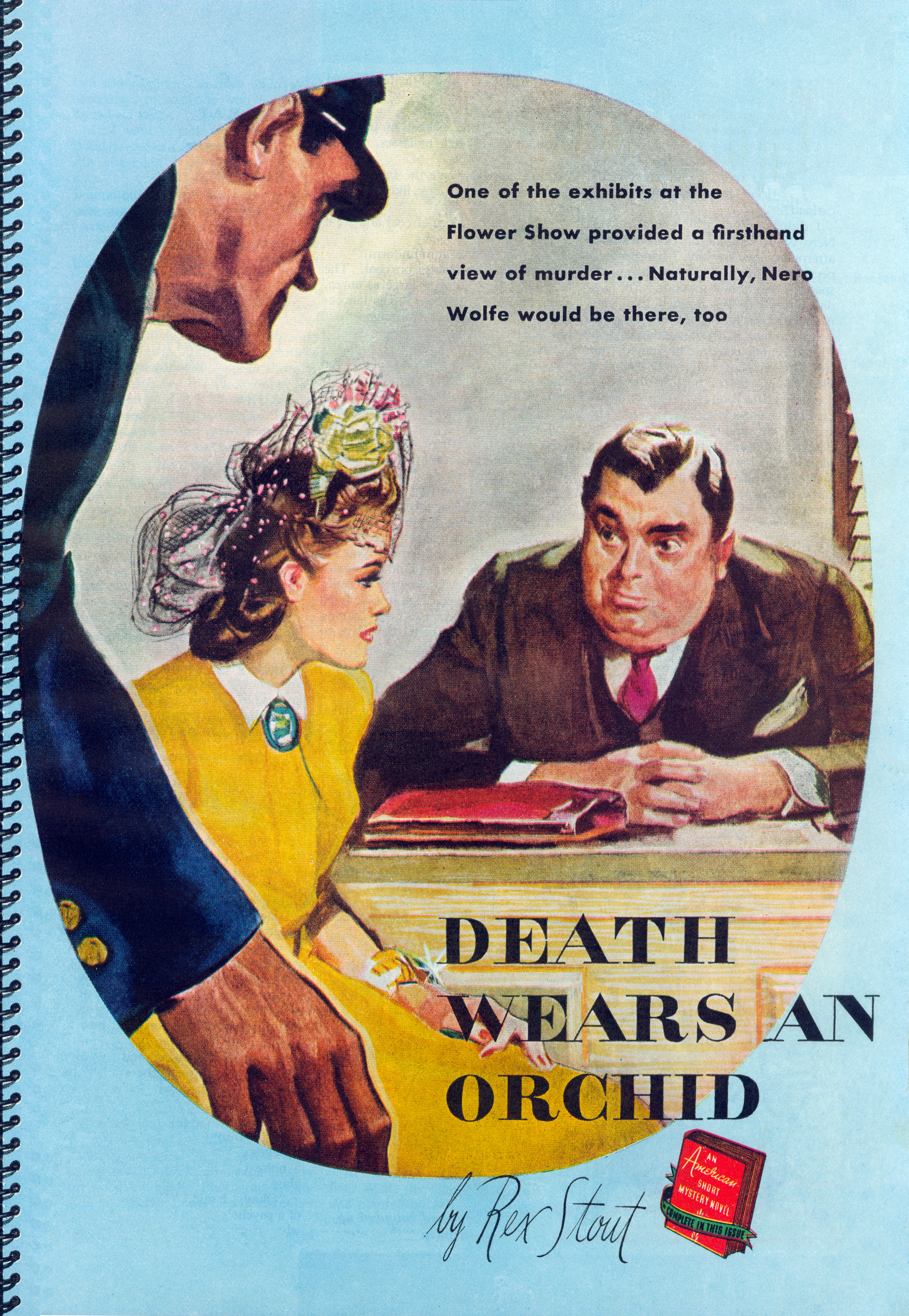
- Illustrated by Fred Ludekens
- Original title: Death Wears an Orchid
- Country: United States
- Language: English
- Genre: Detective fiction

Publication
- Published in: The American Magazine
- Publication type: Periodical
- Publication date: August 1941
- Series: Nero Wolfe

"Black Orchids" is a Nero Wolfe mystery novella by Rex Stout, first published in abridged form as "Death Wears an Orchid" in the August 1941 issue of The American Magazine. It first appeared in book form in the short-story collection Black Orchids, published by Farrar & Rinehart in 1942.

== Plot summary ==
The dick got out his memo book and wrote it down. "I don't think it was deliberate," he said. "I think she just changed her mind. I think she just – "
"You think? You say you think?"
"Yes, Inspector, I – "
"Get out. Take another man, take Dorsey, and go to that address and look into her. Don't pick her up. Keep on her. And for God's sake don't think. It's repulsive, the idea of you thinking."

— Inspector Cramer to a subordinate, in "Black Orchids"

Millionaire orchid fancier Lewis Hewitt has hybridized three black orchid plants in his Long Island greenhouse. Nero Wolfe is wild to have one, so he and Archie Goodwin visit New York's annual flower show, where Hewitt's orchids are on exhibit. One of the other exhibits features a daily performance by a young couple miming a summer picnic. The woman, Anne Tracy, attracts the attentions of Archie, Hewitt, and a young exhibitor named Fred Updegraff.

During Wolfe's visit to the show, Anne's picnic partner Harry Gould is killed, shot in the head by a gun concealed in the foliage. The gun's trigger is attached to a long string that reaches to a hallway well behind the exhibit.

After a little inquiry, Wolfe shows Hewitt how his walking stick was used to pull the string and fire the shot that killed Gould. Hewitt is horrified by the prospect of the publicity that would ensue should his part in the shooting, however indirect and unwitting, become known. Wolfe offers Hewitt this arrangement: in exchange for all three black orchid plants, the only ones in existence, Wolfe will solve the murder and deliver the criminal to the police, without publicly disclosing Hewitt's connection to the crime. Hewitt terms it blackmail, but submits.

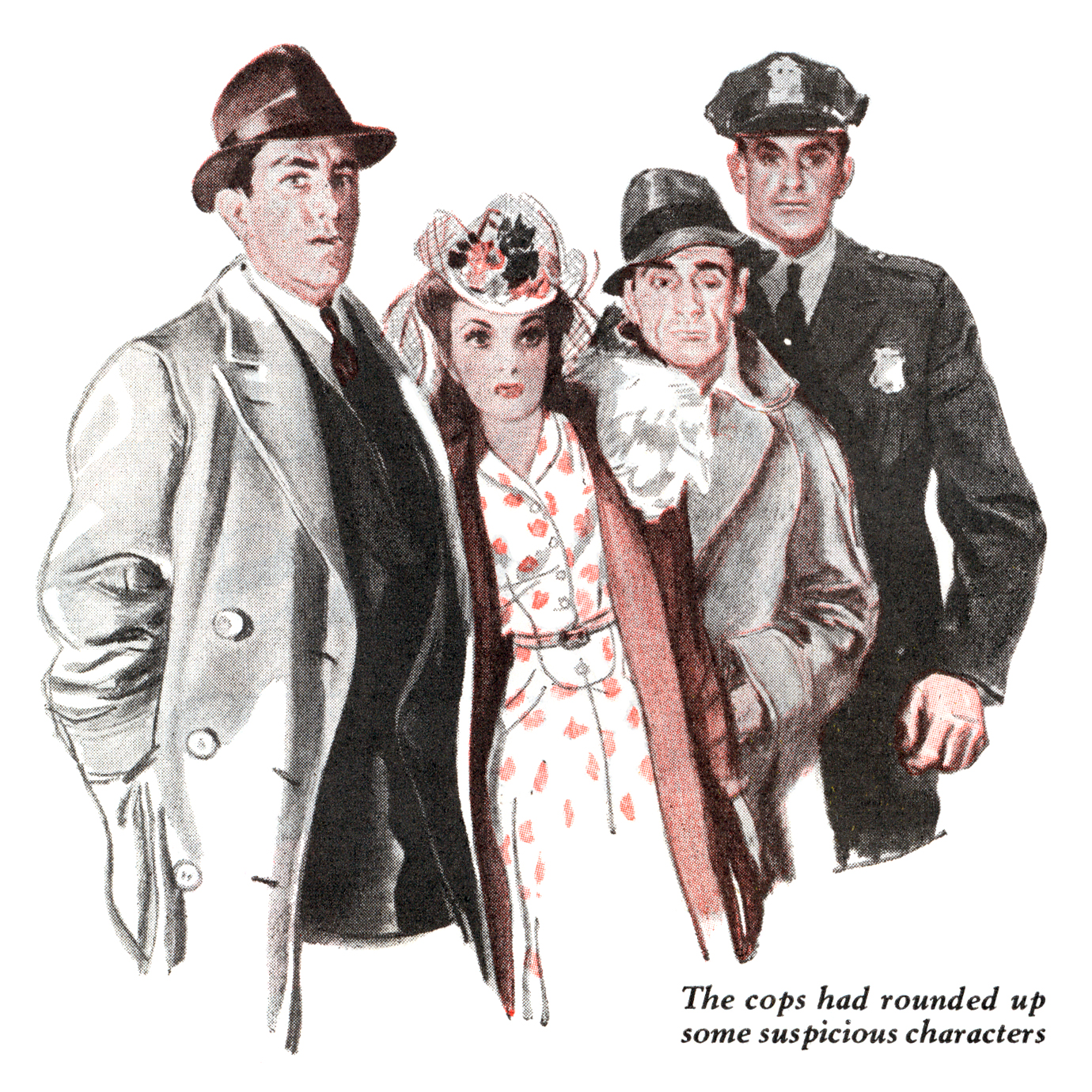
Fred Ludekens illustrated "Death Wears an Orchid" for The American Magazine (August 1941)

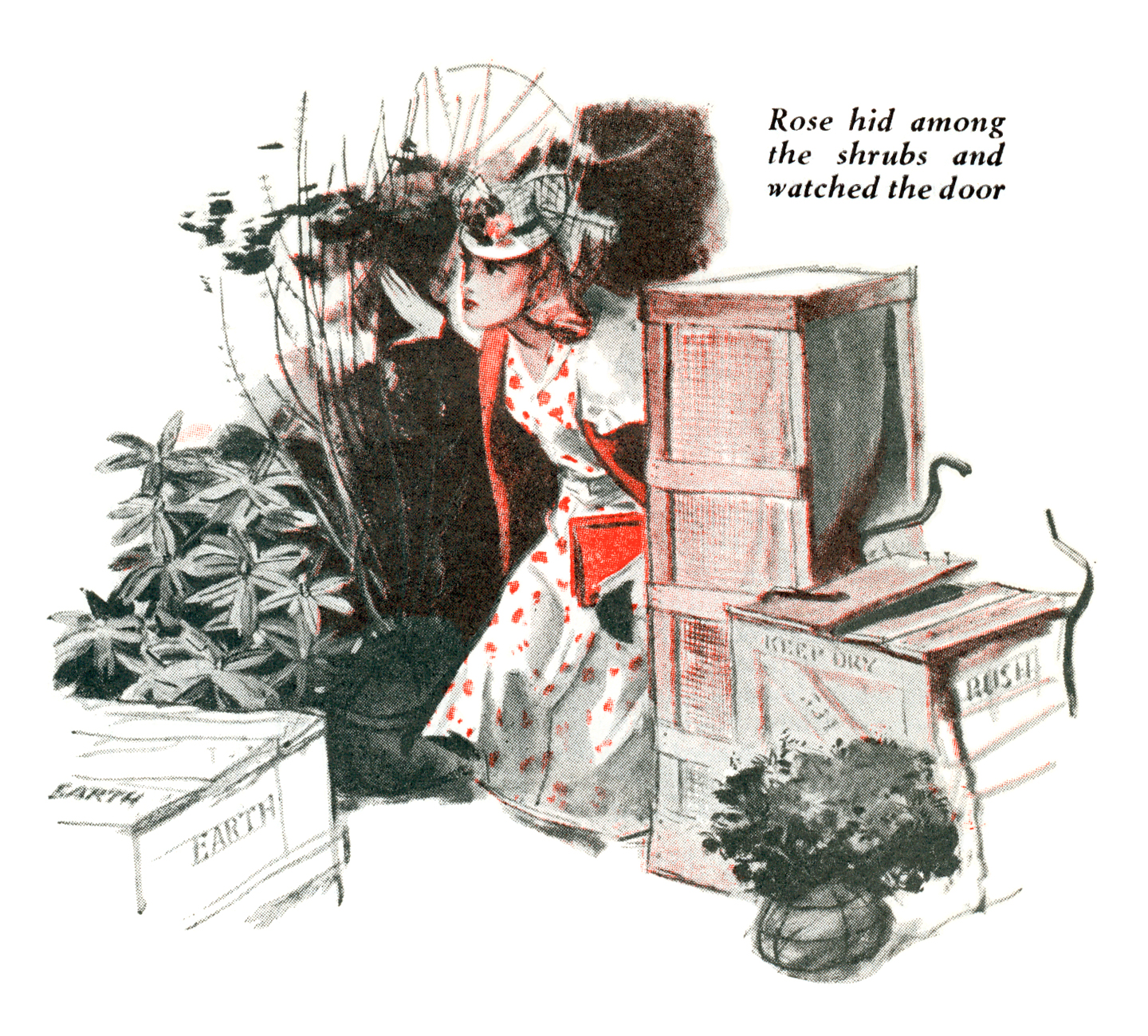
"Rose hid among the shrubs and watched the door"

Earlier, Archie had noticed a woman waiting in the hallway behind the exhibit, at around the time that the murderer would have been deploying the string. He now finds her in the crowd that is gawking at the murder scene. Archie steals her handbag, removes it to the men's room, searches it for identification, and learns her name, Rose Lasher, and address. He returns the handbag to her – all without Rose or anyone else noticing.

The police want to know more about her and, finishing their questions, they let her go, but surreptitiously follow her. The police lose her trail but Archie knows her home address, where she has been living in an apartment with the rent paid by Harry Gould. He arrives at Rose's apartment just as she is about to flee the city, and takes her to Wolfe's house. There Archie searches her suitcase and finds some printed matter that Rose cannot or will not explain: a clipping of an article by Hewitt on Kurume yellows, (Note: The Kurume yellows is apparently a fictional disease. Its name is not located by various Internet search engines in other than discussions of this novella.) a plant disease that is fatal to broadleaf evergreens; a postcard to Rose from Harry, postmarked Salamanca, New York in the western part of the state; and a work order from a garage, also in Salamanca.

Wolfe gets Rose to discuss some of Gould's unsavory qualities. Wolfe learns that although Gould was employed as a gardener, he suddenly acquired a bank account containing several thousand dollars (Note: Bear in mind the publication date, 1942.) and what Miss Lasher terms "a big roll of bills." From his general awareness of horticultural events, Wolfe knows that an attack of Kurume yellows devastated a plantation of a new hybrid of broadleaf evergreens, about eighty miles west of Salamanca and owned by Updegraff Nurseries. The same disease has affected the exhibit in which Anne and Gould were featured; W. G. Dill, one owner of the company sponsoring it, had asked Wolfe to investigate the source.

Weighing all this information, Wolfe assembles the principals in the fumigation chamber of his plant rooms. He accuses Hewitt of conspiring with Gould to infect the plantations of rival growers, and of killing Gould after the latter began to blackmail him. When a telephone call comes in for Hewitt, Wolfe sends Dill to answer it instead, closes the chamber door, and informs the rest of the group that Dill, not Hewitt, is the murderer. Dill is later found dead in the plant rooms, having turned on the flow of fumigation gas with the intent to kill everyone inside the chamber; however, Wolfe had anticipated this action and diverted the gas to fill the plant rooms instead.

Dill had infected the Updegraff plant nursery, as a new plant about to be sold in the market might harm his sales. Wolfe tells Cramer that Anne had previously confirmed his suspicions of Gould's and Dill's activities. He keeps the black orchids, but Cramer is unimpressed by their appearance, saying that he prefers geraniums.

== Connection with other novellas ==
The orchids have a cameo role in the second novella in this collection, "Cordially Invited to Meet Death."

== Allusions to real places ==
Modern references in the text include the Empire State Building, Helen E. Hokinson, a cartoonist at the New Yorker, and Billy Rose, who wrote "It’s Only a Paper Moon."

== Wolfe’s vocabulary ==
Wolfe tells Johnny Keems that “Contact is not a verb…”

== Cast of characters ==
- Nero Wolfe — The private investigator
- Archie Goodwin — Wolfe's assistant (and the narrator of all Wolfe stories)
- Anne Tracy — Secretary at the Rucker and Dill nursery company, and the star of the company's Flower Show exhibit
- Harry Gould — Greenhouse man at Rucker and Dill, the exhibit's co-star, and murder victim
- W. G. Dill — Their employer
- Fred Updegraff — Nursery owner, exhibitor, and Miss Tracy's would-be beau
- Rose Lasher — Harry Gould's girlfriend
- Lewis Hewitt — Wealthy owner and exhibitor of the only three black orchid plants in existence (Note: Also, occasional participant in subsequent Wolfe stories, twice in his capacity as a member of the Ten for Aristology, once as the guardian of Wolfe's orchids (In the Best Families), once to provide help when Wolfe's plant rooms are shot up (The Second Confession), and once to recommend Andy Krasicki as a stand-in for Theodore ("Door to Death").)
- Inspector Cramer and Sergeant Purley Stebbins — Representing Manhattan Homicide
- Johnny Keems — Assists Nero Wolfe as freelance, fetches Anne Tracy and Fred Updegraff to the brownstone
- Saul Panzer — Freelance detective on contract to Wolfe, sent to Salamanca for information on Harry Gould

== Publication history ==
Illustrated by Ben Dale, "Black Orchids" was one of only four Rex Stout stories issued as a Gold Seal Novel by The Philadelphia Inquirer (January 10, 1943)

=== "Black Orchids" ===
- 1941, The American Magazine, August 1941, abridged as "Death Wears an Orchid"
- 1943, The Philadelphia Inquirer, a Gold Seal Novel, January 10, 1943
- 1944, New York: Lawrence E. Spivak, Mercury Mystery #72, not dated, digest paperback
- 1945, Rex Stout Mystery Quarterly #1, May 1945
- 1950, New York: Avon #256 (as "The Case of the Black Orchids"), 1950, paperback
- 1967, The Saint Magazine, January 1967
- 1996, Burlington, Ontario: Durkin Hayes Publishing, DH Audio ISBN 0-88646-889-2 December 1996, audio cassette (unabridged, read by Saul Rubinek)

=== Black Orchids ===
- 1942, New York: Farrar & Rinehart, May 21, 1942, hardcover

Contents include "Black Orchids" and "Cordially Invited to Meet Death".
In his limited-edition pamphlet, Collecting Mystery Fiction #9, Rex Stout's Nero Wolfe Part I, Otto Penzler describes the first edition of Black Orchids: "Brick brown cloth, front cover and spine printed with black; rear cover blank. Issued in a brick brown and green pictorial dust wrapper … The first edition has the publisher's monogram logo on the copyright page."
In April 2006, Firsts: The Book Collector's Magazine estimated that the first edition of Black Orchids had a value of between $3,000 and $5,000. The estimate is for a copy in very good to fine condition in a like dustjacket.

- 1942, Toronto: Oxford University Press, 1942, hardcover
- 1942, New York: Detective Book Club #5, August 1942, hardcover
- 1943, London: Collins Crime Club, July 5, 1943, hardcover
- 1943, New York: Grosset & Dunlap, 1943, hardcover
- 1945, Cleveland, Ohio: World Publishing Company, a Tower Book, March 1945, hardcover
- 1946, New York: Avon #95, 1946, paperback
- 1963, New York: Pyramid (Green Door) #R-917, September 1963, paperback
- 1992, New York: Bantam Crimeline ISBN 0-553-25719-6 May 1992, trade paperback
- 1996, Burlington, Ontario: Durkin Hayes Publishing, DH Audio, "Black Orchids" ISBN 0-88646-889-2 December 1996, audio cassette (unabridged, read by Saul Rubinek)
- 1998, Burlington, Ontario: Durkin Hayes Publishing, DH Audio ISBN 0-88646-472-2 August 1998, audio cassette (unabridged, read by David Elias), "Cordially Invited to Meet Death"
- 2009, New York: Bantam Dell Publishing Group (with The Silent Speaker) ISBN 978-0-553-38655-4 August 25, 2009, trade paperback
- 2010, New York: Bantam Crimeline ISBN 0-307-75573-8 June 30, 2010, e-book
