= Aalma =

Aalma may refer to:

- Aalma (dictionary)
- Alma, Lebanon
