= Catholicon (trilingual dictionary) =

15th-century Breton-French-Latin dictionary

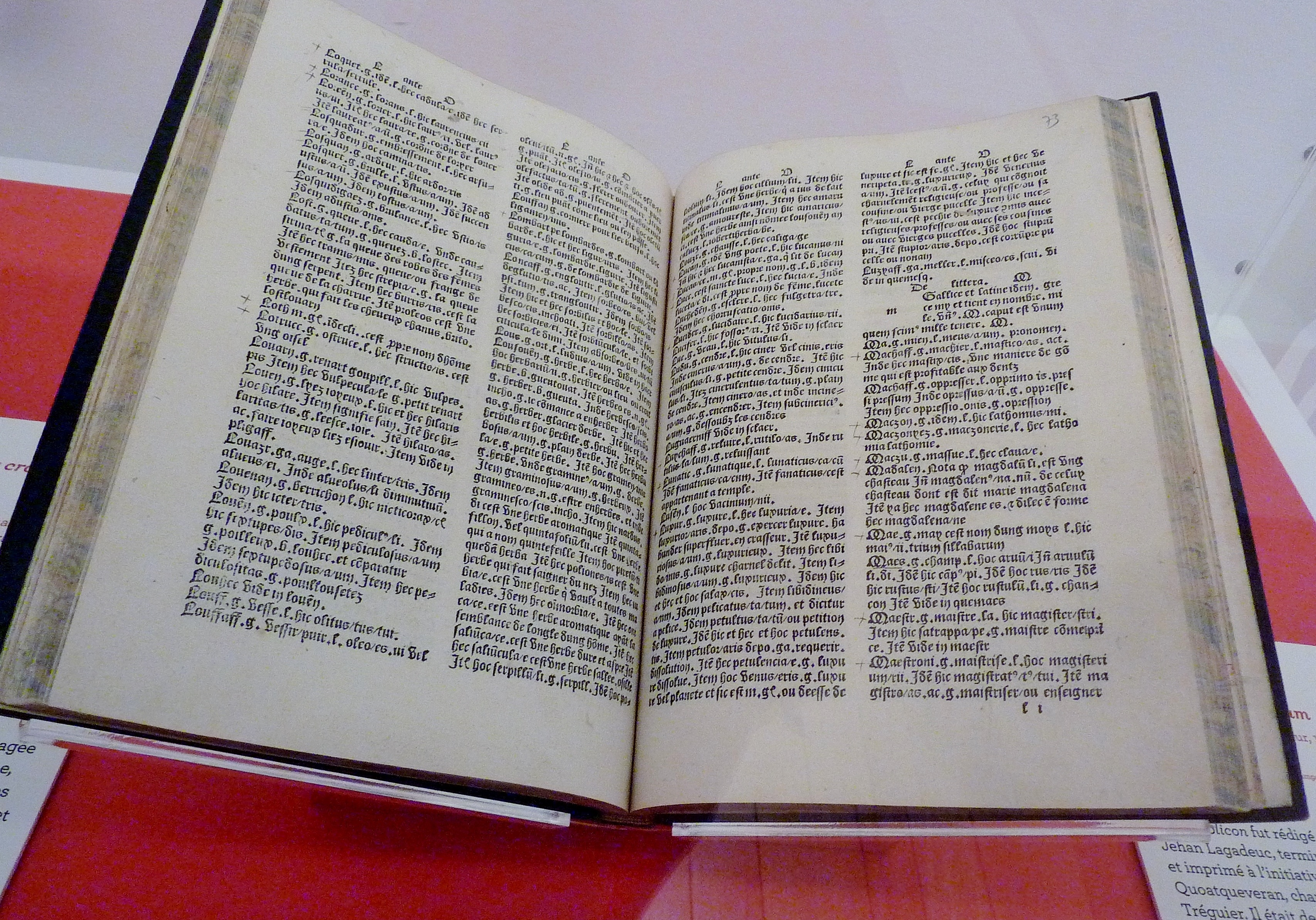
The 1499 edition of the book

The Catholicon (from Greek Καθολικόν 'universal') is a 15th-century dictionary written in Breton, French, and Latin. It is the first Breton dictionary and also the first French dictionary. It contains six thousand entries and was compiled in 1464 by Jehan Lagadeuc, a man from Plougonven who was probably a priest. It was first printed in 1499 in Tréguier; its early date classifies it as an incunable.

The work takes its name from an earlier dictionary, the Latin Catholicon of John of Genoa. The Breton/French/Latin Catholicon is referred to by some historians as the Catholicon Armoricum (in reference to Armorica, a name for the region of Brittany in Latin) in order to distinguish it from other documents with similar names.

== Language ==
The dictionary is arranged alphabetically with Breton entries, followed by translations in French and Latin. Each entry contains additional commentary in Latin, and most editions use Latin for their introductions and any clarifying notes.

Spelling at this time was not standardized in French or in Breton, and different forms of the same word can be found in the text, sometimes even within the same article. French was undergoing changes in pronunciation in the 15th century as Middle French emerged. These changes, along with the replacement of one dialectical form of a word for another, are responsible for the variations in the spelling of French words in the Catholicon. Breton, on the other hand, has been more conservative in its evolution, and at the time of the Catholicon was only "lightly differentiated from Welsh and Cornish". (Note: "Le breton existait dans les îles britanniques depuis très longtemps... il ne s'est que lentement différencié du gallois et du cornique,")

== Editions ==
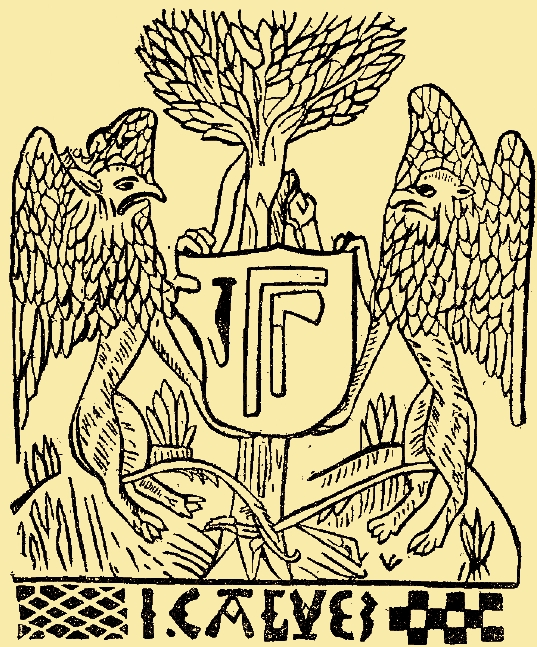
Printer's mark of Jehan Calvez, found in the 1499 edition

Multiple editions exist of the dictionary, some of which differ significantly from each other. The earliest manuscript is dated 1464, August 31, and was compiled by Jehan Lagadeuc. The original is believed to be lost, but an early copy is preserved in the national library in Paris, identified as Latin 7656.

- 1499, November 5 - first edition by Jehan Calvez, a printer from Tréguier. Its early date classifies it as an incunable; only five copies are extant.
- Early 16th Century - second edition by Jehan Corre.
- 1521, January 31 - third edition by Yvon Quillévéré.

Modern editions have been published, starting in 1867.

== Bibliography ==
- Trépos, Pierre (1964). "Le Catholicon de Jehan Lagadeuc. Pour son cinquième centenaire". Annales de Bretagne (in French). 71 (4): 501–552. doi:10.3406/abpo.1964.2236. ISSN 0003-391X.
- Le Catholicon, reproduction of Jehan Calvez's edition (5 November 1499) from a copy at Rennes, edited by Christian-J. Guyonvarc'h, Éditions Ogam, Rennes, 1975
  - –do. –New edition issued by éditions Armeline, Brest, 2005
- Le Men, René-François, ed. (1867). Catholicon de Jehan Lagadeuc, dictionnaire breton, français et latin (in French). Lorient: Éditions et impression Corfmat.
- Le Menn, Gwennole, ed. (2001). Le vocabulaire breton du Catholicon (1499), le premier dictionnaire breton imprimé breton-français-latin de Jehan Lagadeuc. Bibliothèque bretonne (in French). Vol. 11. Spézet: Edition Skol.
- Facsimile edition of the Catholicon
