= Not Quite Dead Enough (novella) =

- Short story by Rex Stout
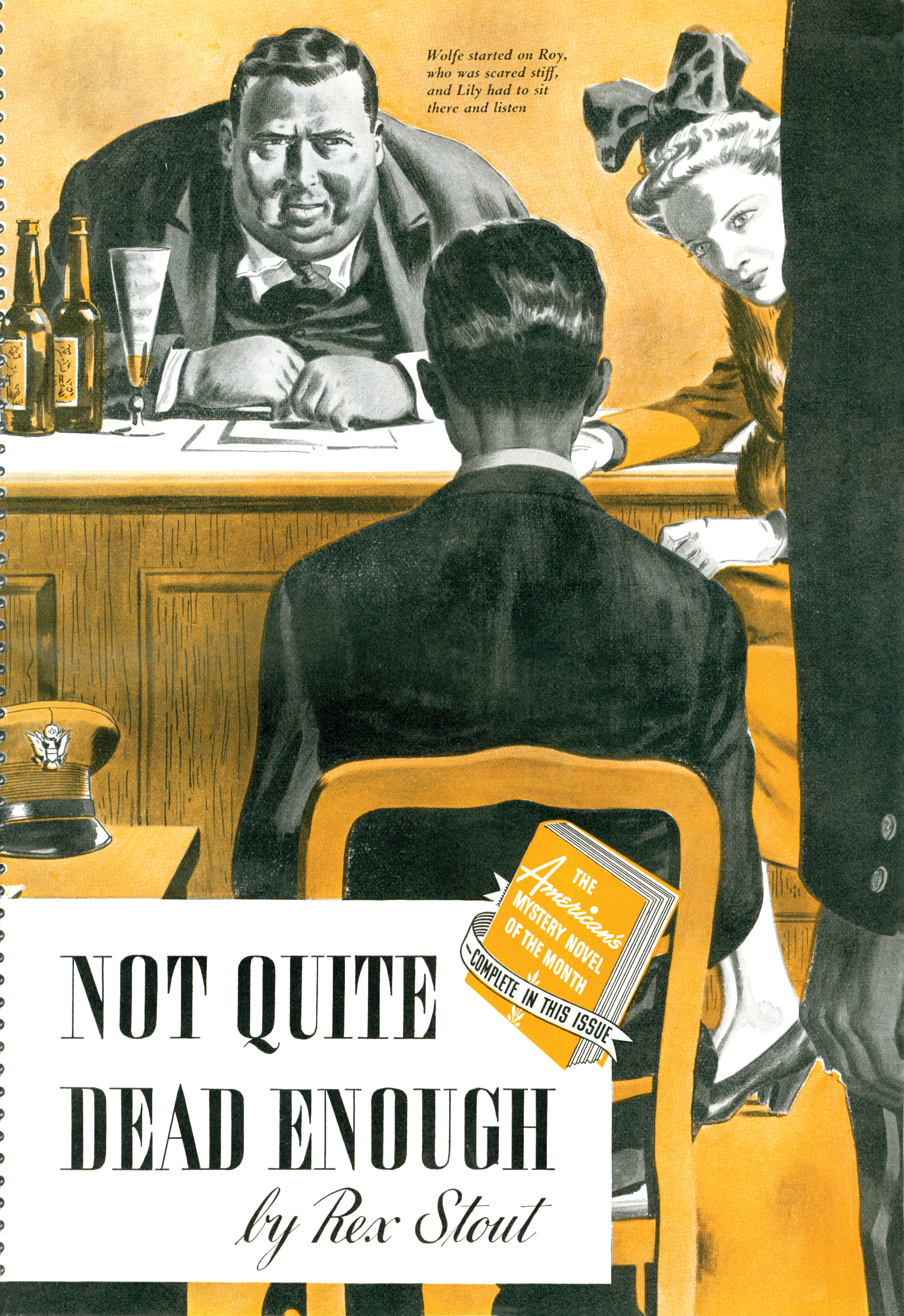
- Cover illustration
- Illustrator: Fred Ludekens
- Country: United States
- Language: English
- Genre: Detective fiction

Publication
- Published in: The American Magazine
- Publication type: Periodical
- Publication date: December 1942
- Series: Nero Wolfe

"Not Quite Dead Enough" is a Nero Wolfe mystery novella by Rex Stout, first published in abridged form in the December 1942 issue of The American Magazine. It first appeared in book form as the first of two novellas in the short-story collection Not Quite Dead Enough, published by Farrar & Rinehart in 1944; Booby Trap (novella) is the second novella in the book.

== Plot summary ==
"It's all right, boss," I said, trying to smile as if I were trying to smile bravely. "I don't think they'll ever convict me. I'm pretty sure they can't. I've got a lawyer coming to see me. You go home and forget about it. I don't want you to break training."

— Archie Goodwin under arrest, to Nero Wolfe, in "Not Quite Dead Enough," chapter 8

Archie has recently joined the Army and is now Major Goodwin. His high rank, as a rookie GI, reflects the fact that the Army recognizes and is making use of his civilian expertise by assigning him to domestic (counter) intelligence, specifically a unit based back in New York City, where Archie lived with his erstwhile boss Nero Wolfe before enlisting.

The Army wants to have Wolfe aid the Intelligence unit. Wolfe does not respond to requests, instead starts a program to lose weight and increase his physical strength. His goal is to enlist as a soldier while Archie is away.

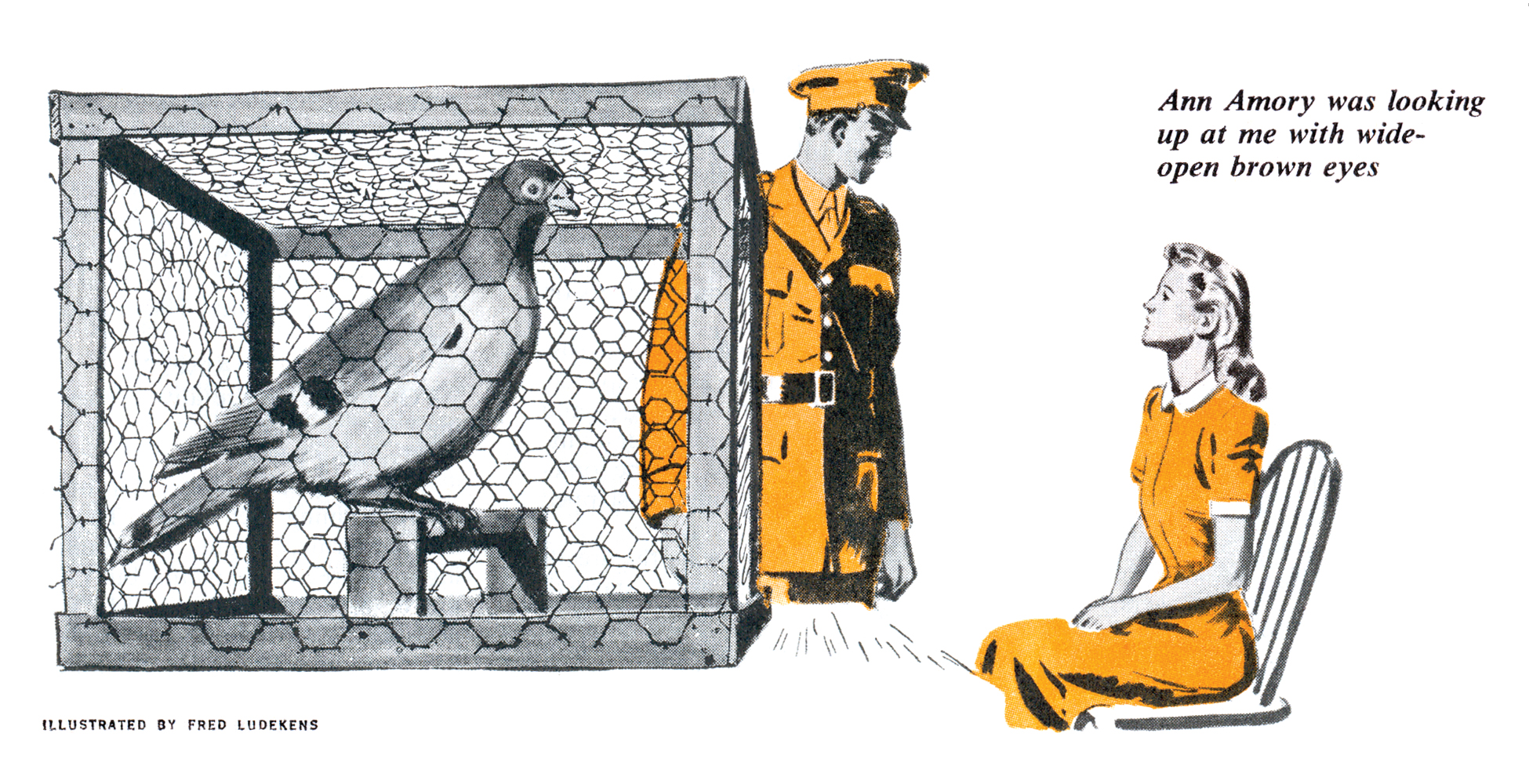
Fred Ludekens illustrated "Not Quite Dead Enough" for The American Magazine (December 1942)

The whole household routine Wolfe is known for has already been abandoned during Archie's absence in favor of strict adherence to wartime rationing and losing weight. This is what Archie finds on his return to the brownstone. His challenge is to re-direct Wolfe to using his mind, not his body, in this war.

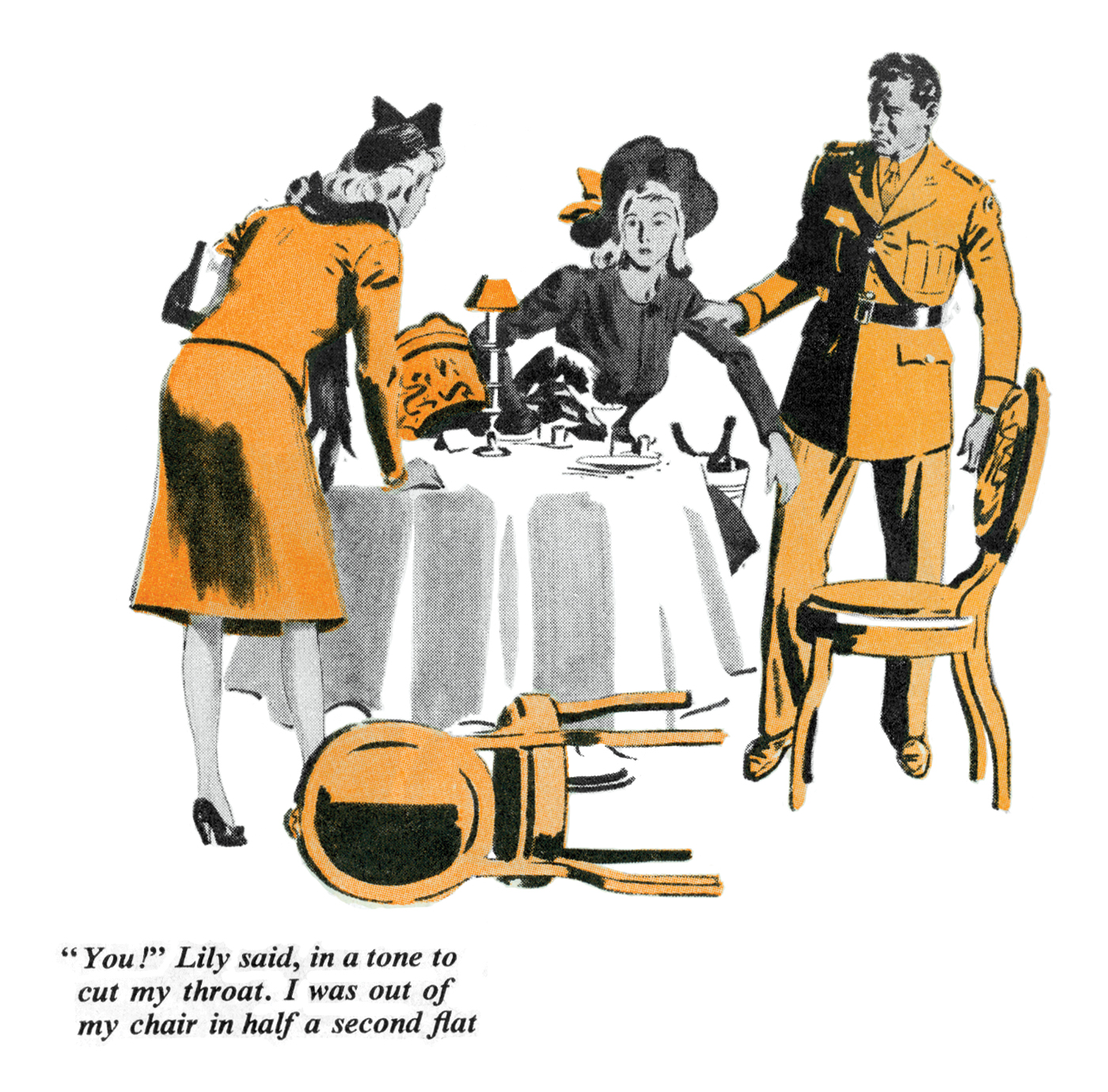
"You!" Lily said, in a tone to cut my throat. I was out of my chair in half a second flat

On the flight back to New York from Washington, Archie encounters wealthy and beautiful Lily Rowan, (introduced in Some Buried Caesar) and with whom he has the beginnings of a romance. She has gone to great lengths to be on this flight. Lily asks him to look into a problem a girl-friend of hers is having. Archie seizes this opportunity to find a case for Wolfe to solve.

Archie takes Lily's friend to the Flamingo nightclub, as Anne Amory is not answering Archie’s questions at her apartment building. Lily sees the pair, and is jealous. When Archie has Roy Douglas in the brownstone the next day, Lily tries again to get his full attention. At the partly open door, she tells the tale of her dead friend. Roy leaves rapidly and Archie follows him to Anne’s apartment. Archie implicates himself in the crime by leaving evidence at the scene. He is arrested, and uses his phone call to a newspaper to assure coverage the next morning. Wolfe reads the story over breakfast and comes to the police office to get him released, by telling his story. In return, Archie asks Wolfe to meet with Army Intelligence.

Thus Archie is free and Wolfe can find Anne Amory’s murderer. Lily Rowan and Roy Douglas are the likely suspects. They come to the brownstone, where police are listening to the conversation. Wolfe realizes the nub of Lily’s motive for her actions, wanting to see Archie and get his full attention after two months. She had not left home early enough, nor gone to Anne's apartment, before heading to the brownstone that day. She did not know Roy was present as she spoke to Archie at the door. Roy leaves immediately, finding that his fiancée is “not quite dead enough”, that is, fully alive. So he does the job, matching the details of the scene to those he heard Lily say. Lily made up that story to get Archie’s attention. Others in the apartment building know Roy had killed another woman a few months earlier. That woman was threatening to block his care for his prize pigeons. Anne knew, and that was his motive for killing his fiancée. He really wants to spend all his time with those birds, and he loses that. Cramer arrests him for murder.

Archie and Wolfe are working together again, and Wolfe agrees to contribute to the war effort by working with Army Intelligence in the Second World War.

== Publication history ==
=== "Not Quite Dead Enough" ===
- 1942, The American Magazine, December 1942, abridged
- 1954, Nero Wolfe's Mystery Magazine, June 1954.

=== Not Quite Dead Enough ===
- 1944, New York: Farrar & Rinehart, September 7, 1944, hardcover

Contents include "Not Quite Dead Enough" and "Booby Trap"
In his limited-edition pamphlet, Collecting Mystery Fiction #9, Rex Stout's Nero Wolfe Part I, Otto Penzler describes the first edition of Not Quite Dead Enough: "Red cloth, front cover and spine printed with black; rear cover blank. Issued in a mainly black, red and blue pictorial dust wrapper. … The first edition has the publisher's monogram logo on the copyright page. the second printing, in the same year, is identical to the first except that the logo was dropped."
In April 2006, Firsts: The Book Collector's Magazine estimated that the first edition of Not Quite Dead Enough had a value of between $1,000 and $2,000.

- 1944, Toronto: Oxford University Press, 1944, hardcover
- 1944, New York: Detective Book Club #33, December 1944, hardcover
- 1944, New York: Detective Book Club, 1944, hardcover
- 1945, New York: Armed Services Edition #P-6, February 1945, paperback
- 1946, New York: Grosset & Dunlap, 1946, hardcover
- New York: Lawrence E. Spivak, Jonathan Press #J27, not dated, paperback
- 1949, New York: Dell mapback #267, 1949, paperback
- 1963, New York: Pyramid (Green Door) #R-822, February 1963, paperback
- 1992, New York: Bantam Crimeline ISBN 0-553-26109-6 October 1992, paperback, Rex Stout Library edition with introduction by John Lutz
- 1995, Burlington, Ontario: Durkin Hayes Publishing, DH Audio ISBN 0-88646-727-6 July 1994, audio cassette (unabridged, read by Saul Rubinek)
- 2004, Auburn, California: The Audio Partners Publishing Corp., Mystery Masters ISBN 1-57270-362-8 February 2004, audio CD (unabridged, read by Michael Prichard)
- 2010, New York: Bantam Crimeline ISBN 978-0-307-75607-7 May 26, 2010, e-book
