= Gold Seal =

Gold Seal may refer to:

- RCA Red Seal Records § Gold Seal, record label
- Harold Schafer § Gold Seal Company
- Gold Seal Novel
- Gold Seal Winery
- King of Na gold seal
- Gold Seal Ltd. v. Alberta (Attorney-General), a judgement by the Supreme Court of Canada regarding Section 121 of the Constitution Act, 1867
- Gold Seal, a Canadian brand of canned sea food
