= Where There's a Will (novel) =

1940 novel by Rex Stout

- Author: Rex Stout
- Language: English
- Series: Nero Wolfe
- Genre: Detective fiction
- Publisher: Farrar & Rinehart
- Publication date: June 10, 1940
- Publication place: United States
- Media type: Print (Hardcover)
- Pages: 272 pp. (first edition)
- OCLC: 8560901
- Preceded by: Over My Dead Body
- Followed by: Black Orchids

Where There's a Will is the eighth Nero Wolfe detective novel by Rex Stout. Prior to its publication in 1940 by Farrar & Rinehart, Inc., the novel was abridged in the May 1940 issue of The American Magazine, titled "Sisters in Trouble". The story's magazine appearance was "reviewed" by the FBI as part of its surveillance of Stout.

Where There's a Will was the last Wolfe novel published before World War II. Stout did not write any others during the war, resuming the series with The Silent Speaker in 1946; he did, however, continue to publish shorter works featuring the character.

== Plot summary ==
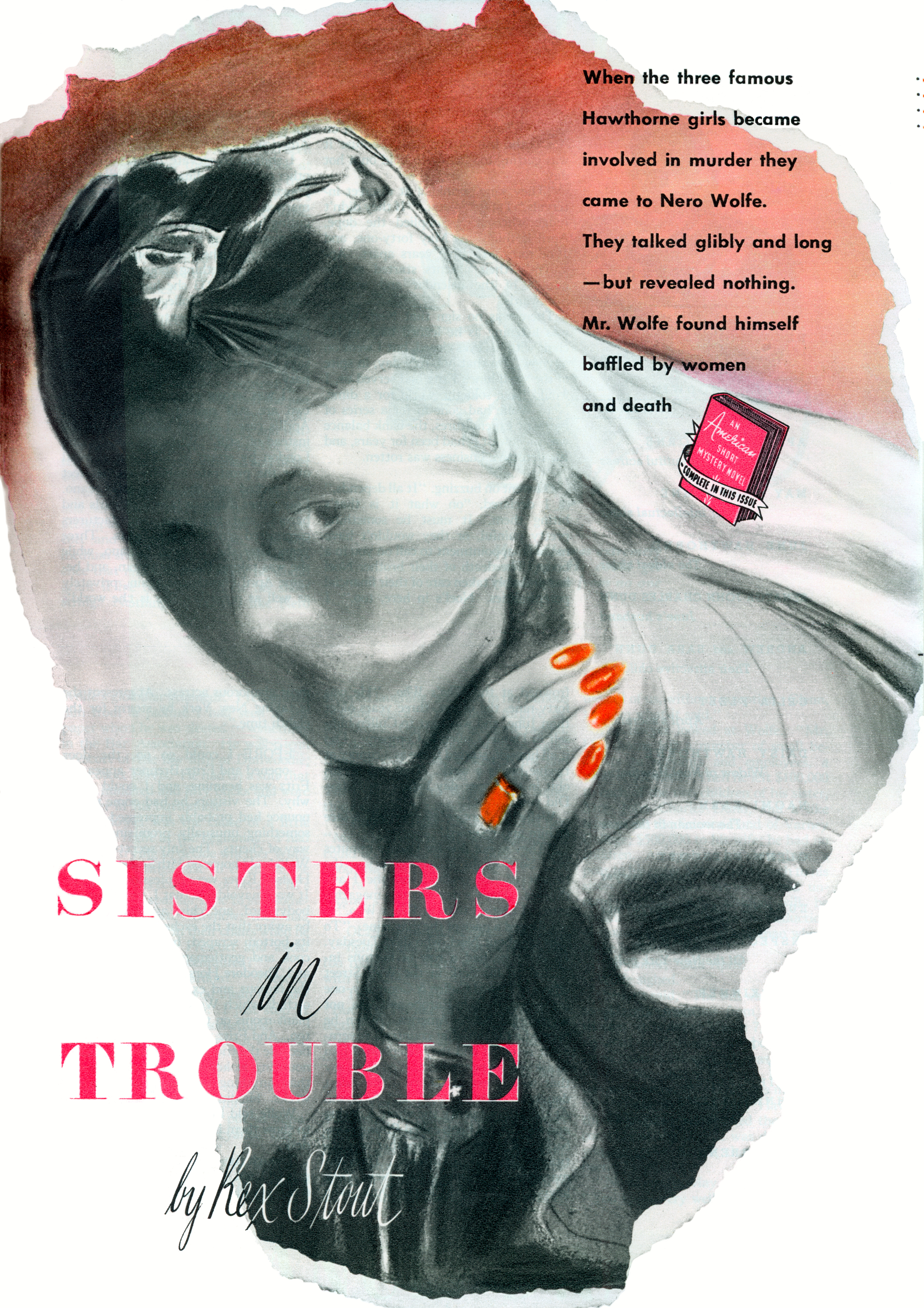
Carl Mueller illustrated "Sisters in Trouble," the abridged version of Where There's a Will that appeared in the May 1940 issue of The American Magazine

The famous Hawthorne sisters — April, May and June — visit Nero Wolfe in a body to ask his help in averting a scandal. After the shock of their brother Noel's death three days before, they have been dealt another shock at learning the terms of his will. May, a college president, insists that Noel had promised to leave $1 million to her school; however, the will leaves each sister nothing but a piece of fruit and passes almost all of Noel's estate to a young woman named Naomi Karn. The sisters want to hire Wolfe to persuade Naomi to turn over at least half of the inheritance so that Noel's widow Daisy will not bring a case to court that would cause a sensation.

Daisy's unexpected arrival interrupts the conference. She wears a veil at all times to cover the disfiguring scars left after Noel accidentally shot her with a bow and arrow. She discovered that Noel was having an affair with Naomi and now hates the entire Hawthorne family as a result. Wolfe assures her that he will consider her interests in addition to those of the sisters and attempt to negotiate with Naomi on their behalf.

Later that day, Inspector Cramer interrupts another meeting with the news that Noel had in fact been murdered. He had been killed by a shotgun blast while hunting on his country estate; it was assumed that he had tripped and discharged the weapon, but further analysis of the evidence has led the police to discard this theory. Archie is called away to help Fred Durkin keep an eye on a man whom Fred had been tailing - Eugene Davis, a partner at the law firm that drew up Noel's will, who had been seen in a bar with Naomi. Davis is now drunk and passed out in a run-down apartment.

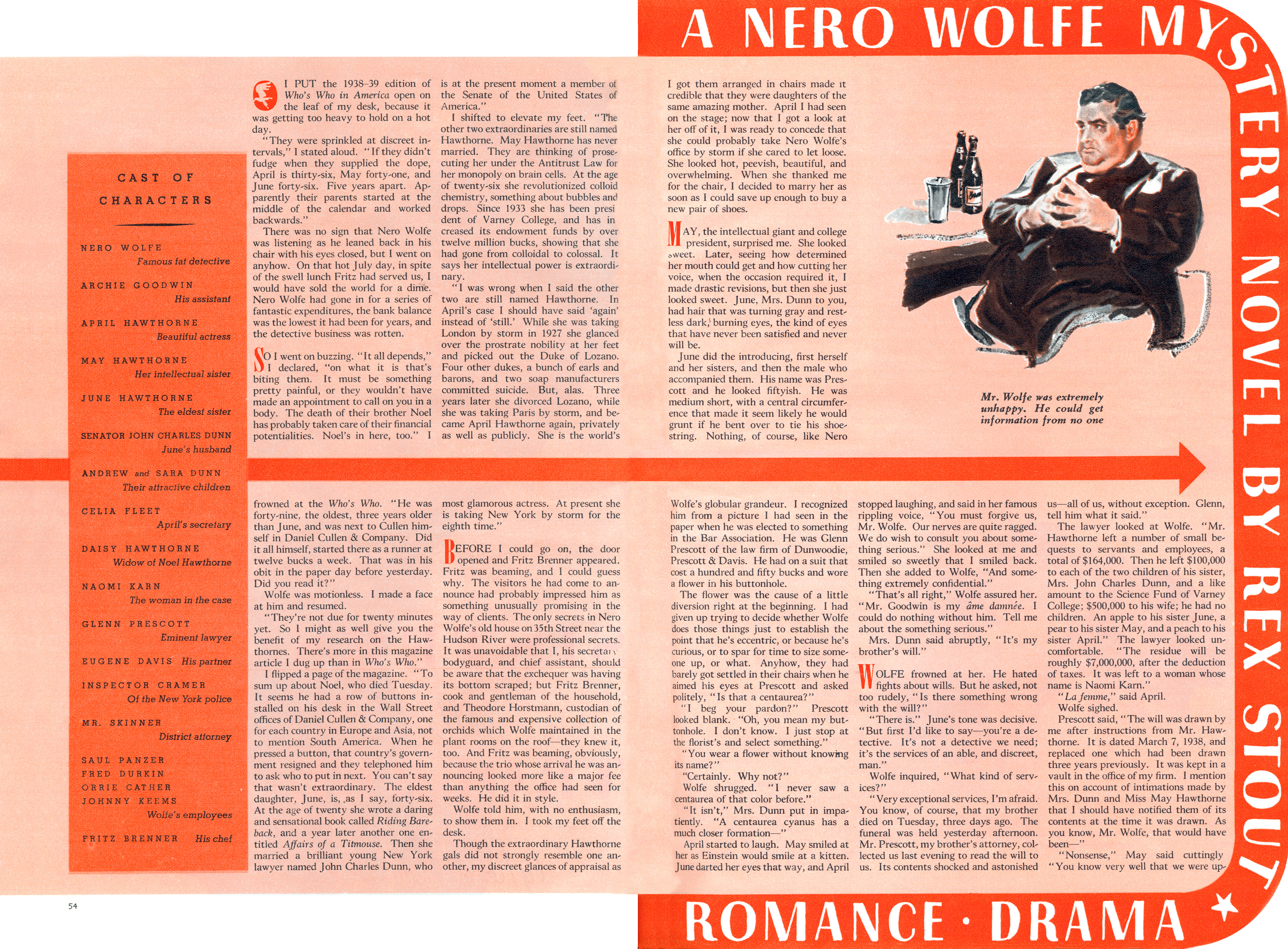

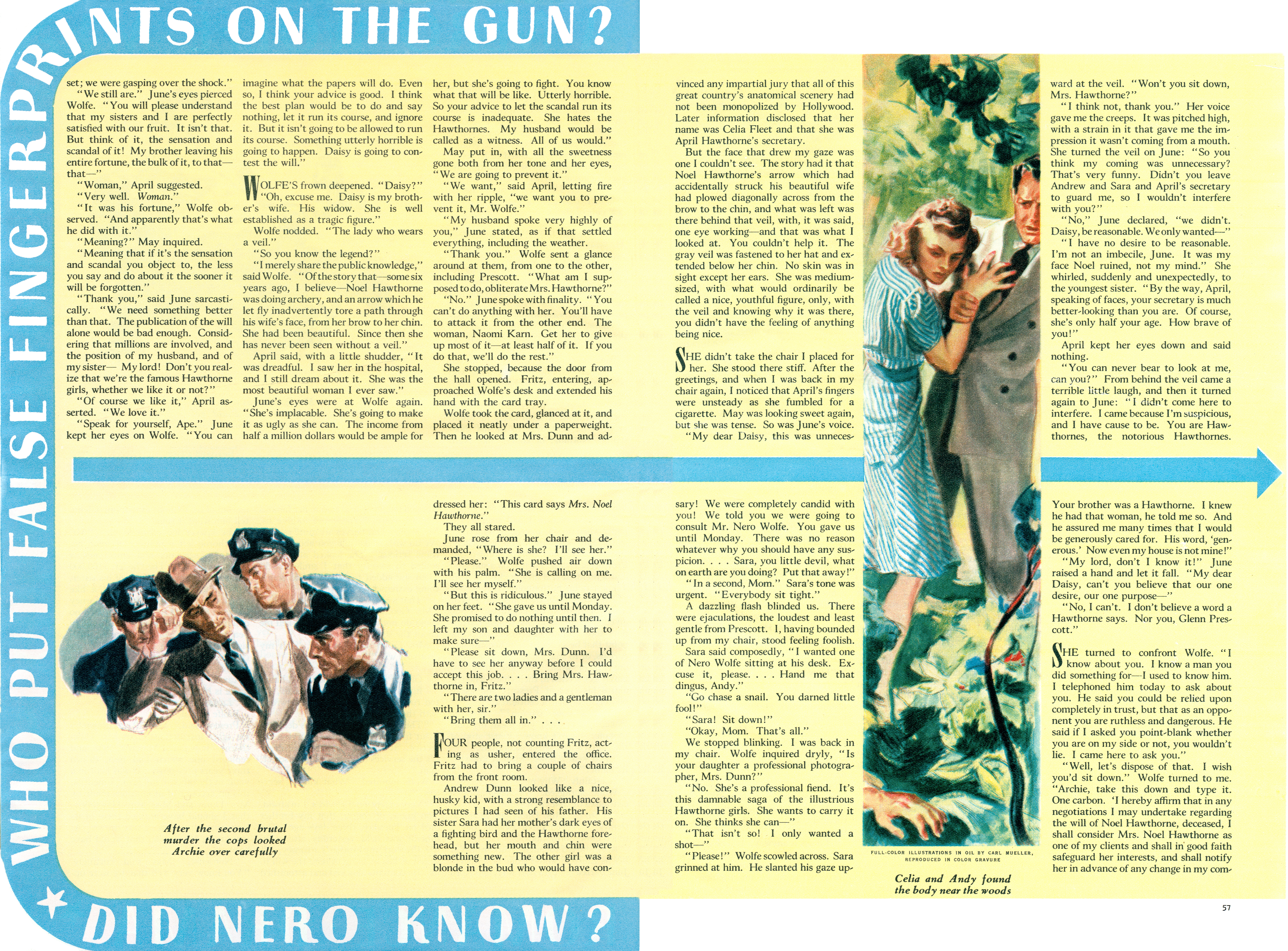

On Wolfe's orders, Archie travels to the Hawthorne mansion on 67th Street, where he finds Wolfe, the family and other associated individuals gathered to meet with the local police. Archie finds, to his surprise, that there are apparently two Daisy Hawthornes in the house. One is meeting with Wolfe and accusing April of the murder, based on the fact that a cornflower was found next to the body and April had had a bunch of them with her. The other is speaking to Naomi in the living room. The one meeting with Wolfe turns out to be the real Daisy, and Wolfe later determines that the other was actually April in disguise, trying to get information out of Naomi about the will and the relationship between her and Noel.

Later in the day, Archie finds Naomi strangled to death, her body hidden in an alcove next to the living room. Wolfe slips out of the house without telling Archie and has Orrie Cather drive him back to Wolfe's brownstone on 35th Street. After being confronted by the Hawthornes, Daisy spitefully claims to the police that April is the murderer, and she is arrested by the authorities. Meanwhile, June's daughter Sara tells Archie that someone has stolen her camera. The film it contained had already been sent off to be developed, and Wolfe and Archie later retrieve the pictures. After examining them, Wolfe warns Sara that her life will be in danger if she returns to the estate and has her stay at the brownstone. Cramer threatens to arrest Wolfe as a material witness to Naomi's murder, but Wolfe counters by threatening to turn evidence of the murderer's guilt over to a local newspaper instead of the police.

With all of the principals assembled in his office, Wolfe accuses Davis of switching Noel's actual will (which left generous bequests to Daisy, his sisters and May's college) with a forgery that leaves nearly the entire estate to Naomi, in a plot to win her affections, and of killing Noel and Naomi. When Glenn Prescott, another of the law firm's partners, agrees with this theory, Davis angrily accuses him of the murders. Wolfe then reveals his evidence: one of Sara's pictures, which shows Prescott wearing a wild rose in his lapel, a flower that he could not have obtained in the city. He had picked it at the scene of Noel's murder, discarding the cornflower he had worn (later found near the body), and had only remembered after Sara had taken the photograph. Prescott is placed under arrest, and Archie decides to keep the material witness warrant as a souvenir.

== The unfamiliar word ==
"Nero Wolfe talks in a way that no human being on the face of the earth has ever spoken, with the possible exception of Rex Stout after he had a gin and tonic," said Michael Jaffe, executive producer of the A&E TV series, A Nero Wolfe Mystery. Nero Wolfe's erudite vocabulary is one of the hallmarks of the character. Examples of unfamiliar words — or unfamiliar uses of words that some would otherwise consider familiar — are found throughout the corpus, often in the give-and-take between Wolfe and Archie.

- Caracoles, chapter 5. Seated in the red chair, Naomi Karn begins her conversation with Nero Wolfe with an evasive maneuver. Wolfe wiggles a finger at her and states, "Let's don't start with caracoles."

== Contemporary references ==
The story includes a number of passing oblique references to the 1939-40 New York World's Fair that was current at the time of publication. Separate mentions are made of the Trylon and Perisphere and the Polish Pavilion, all structures present at the Fair grounds.

== Cast of characters ==
- Nero Wolfe — Famous fat detective
- Archie Goodwin — His assistant
- April Hawthorne — Beautiful actress
- May Hawthorne — Her intellectual sister, president of Varney College
- June Hawthorne — The oldest sister
- John Charles Dunn — June's husband, U.S. Secretary of State
- Andrew Dunn and Sara Dunn — Their children
- Celia Fleet — April's secretary
- Daisy Hawthorne — Veiled widow of Noel Hawthorne, brother of the three famous Hawthorne girls
- Glenn Prescott — Eminent attorney who drew Noel Hawthorne's will
- Eugene Davis — His partner
- Naomi Karn — The woman of the case
- Inspector Cramer — Of the New York homicide squad
- Fritz Brenner — Wolfe's chef and major-domo
- Saul Panzer, Fred Durkin, Orrie Cather and Johnny Keems — Detectives in Wolfe's employ

== Reviews and commentary ==
- Jacques Barzun and Wendell Taylor Hertig, A Catalogue of Crime — Endless talk over how to keep a kept woman from inheriting millions which only she thinks have been left her and then — after deceased is shown to have been murdered — more talk about who did it. Wolfe spots the criminal by looking closely at six small photographs (poorly reproduced in the book) and applying his knowledge of floriculture."
- Herbert Mitgang, Dangerous Dossiers: Exposing the Secret War Against America's Greatest Authors — While [World War II] was on, Stout, who had organized the Writers' War Board and became its chairman, was placed on something called the "General Watch List." Hoover himself, according to a heavily censored page marked Confidential, requested Byron Price, director of Censorship, Federal Trade Commission Building, Washington, to include Rex Stout of Brewster, New York, on "General Watch List No. 49."
  The FBI watched what Stout wrote and somehow turned his fiction into suspicious fact. Because, for example, of a story that appeared in the May 1940 issue of American Magazine called "Sisters in Trouble," he was labeled what might be called "prematurely anti-Nazi." A highly imaginative document from Los Angeles (correspondent's name censored) to the FBI's Communications Division in Washington claimed that the story was "either a deliberate attempt to convey a meaning other than the solution of a mystery story — or else the whole thing is full of coincidences. Note the almost exclusive German cast of characters, particularly Fritz Brenner. Could Fritz refer to the German Consul in San Francisco and could Brenner have any reference to the Brenner pass? Could 'Nero' refer to Rome by any chance? While for the purposes of the story, April, May and June are the names of three sisters, couldn't it also mean that for three months, or until July, somebody's back was to the door — maybe the door to the Balkans or the Mediterranean?"
  When it served its purposes, agents of the FBI could turn into literary critics, finding, however ludicrous, damning symbols in fiction.

== Adaptations ==
=== Un incidente di caccia (Radiotelevisione Italiana) ===
Where There's a Will was adapted for a series of Nero Wolfe films produced by the Italian television network RAI (Radiotelevisione Italiana). Directed by Giuliana Berlinguer from a teleplay by Vladimiro Cajoli, Nero Wolfe: Un incidente di caccia first aired July 13, 1969.

The series of black-and-white telemovies stars Tino Buazzelli (Nero Wolfe), Paolo Ferrari (Archie Goodwin), Pupo De Luca (Fritz Brenner), Renzo Palmer (Inspector Cramer), Roberto Pistone (Saul Panzer), Mario Righetti (Orrie Cather) and Gianfranco Varetto (Fred Durkin). Other members of the cast of Un incidente di caccia include Paola Mannoni (Mary), Gianna Piaz (Clotilde), Esmeralda Ruspoli (Amelia), Antonio Pierfederici (Glenn Prescott), Mariolina Bovo] (Diana Karn), Edmonda Aldini (Daisy Hawthorne), Pier Paola Bucchi (Sara Dunn) and Claudio Gora (John Charles Dunn).

== Publication history ==
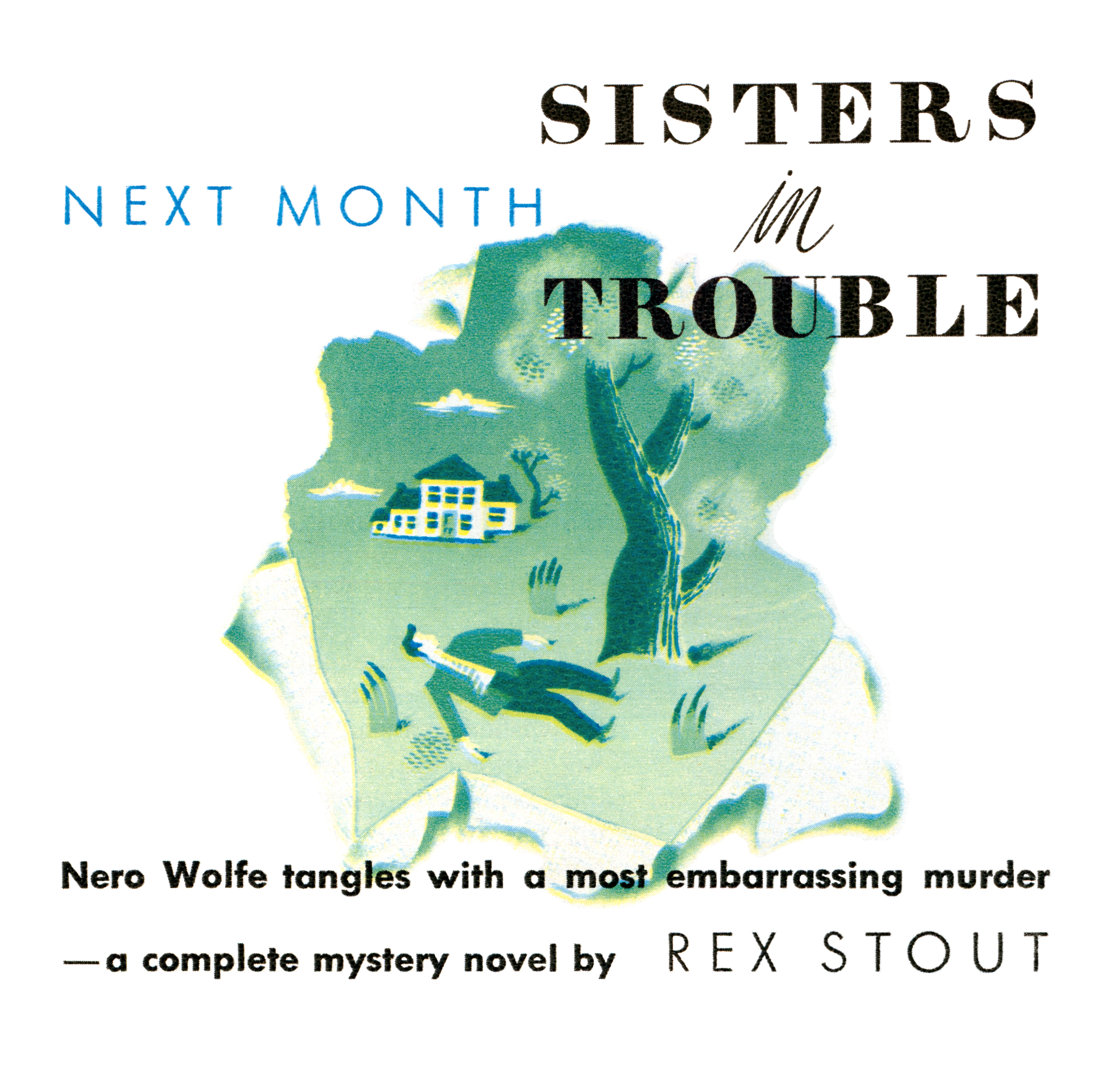
Teaser for "Sisters in Trouble" in The American Magazine (April 1940)

The photographs that help Nero Wolfe solve the mystery appeared in the first edition of Where There's a Will (1940) (Note: "Not only are the pictures so small that they are useless in providing a clue to the reader, but the leafless trees were a mistake for an event that was supposed to have happened in July of 1939," wrote Rev. Frederick G. Gotwald in The Nero Wolfe Companion (Number 2, 1989, Salisbury, North Carolina, p. 48). Rex Stout received many letters of complaint, biographer John McAleer reported. "The blooper had been Farrar & Rinehart's. Bundling up a representative selection of letters received, Rex sent them to John Farrar with a covering letter that was but faintly civil." (McAleer, John, Rex Stout: A Biography, 1977, Little, Brown and Company; ISBN 0-316-55340-9, p. 280))

- 1940, The American Magazine, May 1940, abridged as "Sisters in Trouble"
- 1940, New York: Farrar & Rinehart, June 10, 1940, hardcover

In his limited-edition pamphlet, Collecting Mystery Fiction #9, Rex Stout's Nero Wolfe Part I, Otto Penzler describes the first edition of Where There's a Will: "Red cloth, front cover and spine printed with black; rear cover blank. Issued in a mainly black, white and orange pictorial dust wrapper … The first edition has the publisher's monogram logo on the copyright page."
In April 2006, Firsts: The Book Collector's Magazine estimated that the first edition of Where There's a Will had a value of between $4,000 and $7,500.

- 1940, The Philadelphia Inquirer, a Gold Seal Novel, December 29, 1940, abridged
- 1941, London: Collins Crime Club, March 17, 1941, hardcover
- 1942, New York: Grosset & Dunlap, 1942, hardcover
- 1943, New York: Lawrence E. Spivak, Bestseller Mystery #44, abridged as Where There is a Will, not dated, October 1943, digest paperback
- 1946, New York: Avon #103, 1946, paperback; photos can be found between pages 162 and 163, 25¢
- 1959, New York: Avon T-374, paperback, 35¢
- 1963, New York: Avon F-192, paperback, 40¢
- 1966, New York: Avon #G1285, fourth printing, paperback
- 1971, London: Tom Stacey, 1971, hardcover
- 1992, New York: Bantam Crimeline ISBN 0-553-29591-8, 1992, paperback, Rex Stout Library edition with introduction by Dean R. Koontz
- 1995, New York: Bantam Books ISBN 0-553-76301-6 March 1995, trade paperback
- 2006, Auburn, California: The Audio Partners Publishing Corp., Mystery Masters ISBN 1-57270-551-5 October 28, 2006, audio CD (unabridged, read by Michael Prichard)
- 2010, New York: Bantam ISBN 978-0-307-75635-0 May 26, 2010, e-book
