= Booby Trap (novella) =

- Short story by Rex Stout
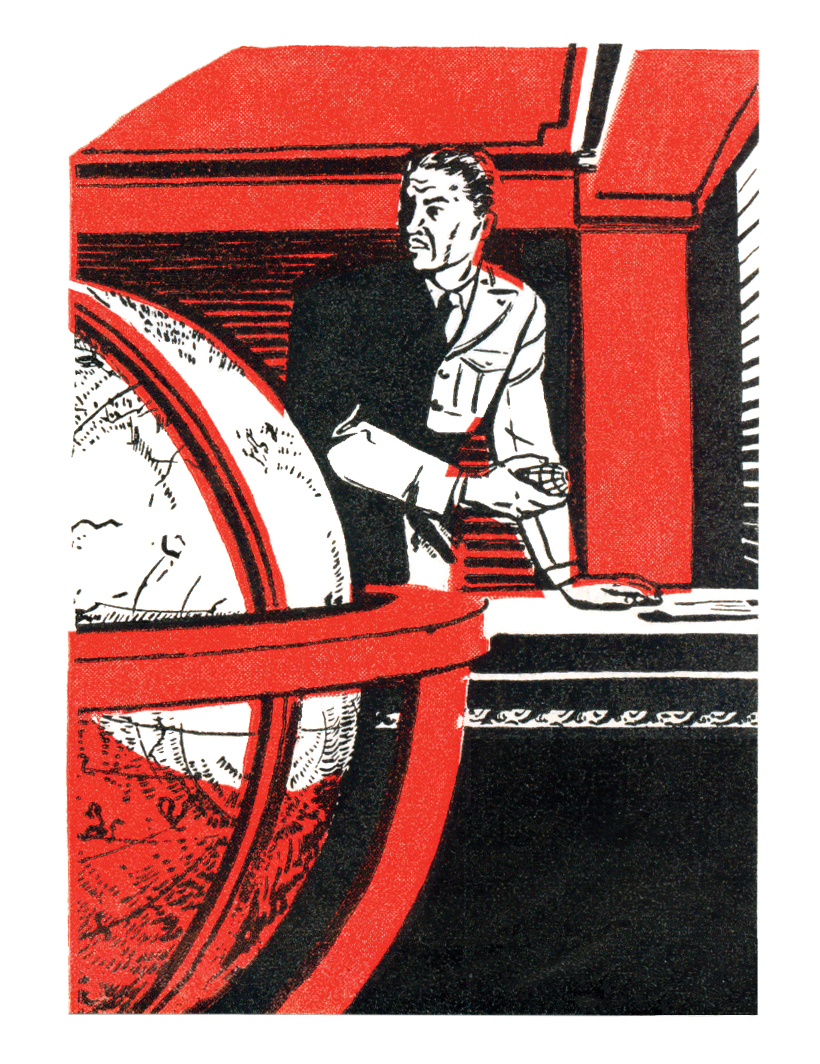
- Illustration in The American Magazine
- Illustrator: Jane Huttenloch
- Country: United States
- Language: English
- Genre: Detective fiction

Publication
- Published in: The American Magazine
- Publication type: Periodical
- Publication date: August 1944
- Series: Nero Wolfe

"Booby Trap" is a Nero Wolfe mystery novella by Rex Stout, first published in the August 1944 issue of The American Magazine. It first appeared in book form as the second novella in the short-story collection Not Quite Dead Enough, published by Farrar & Rinehart in 1944.

== Plot summary ==
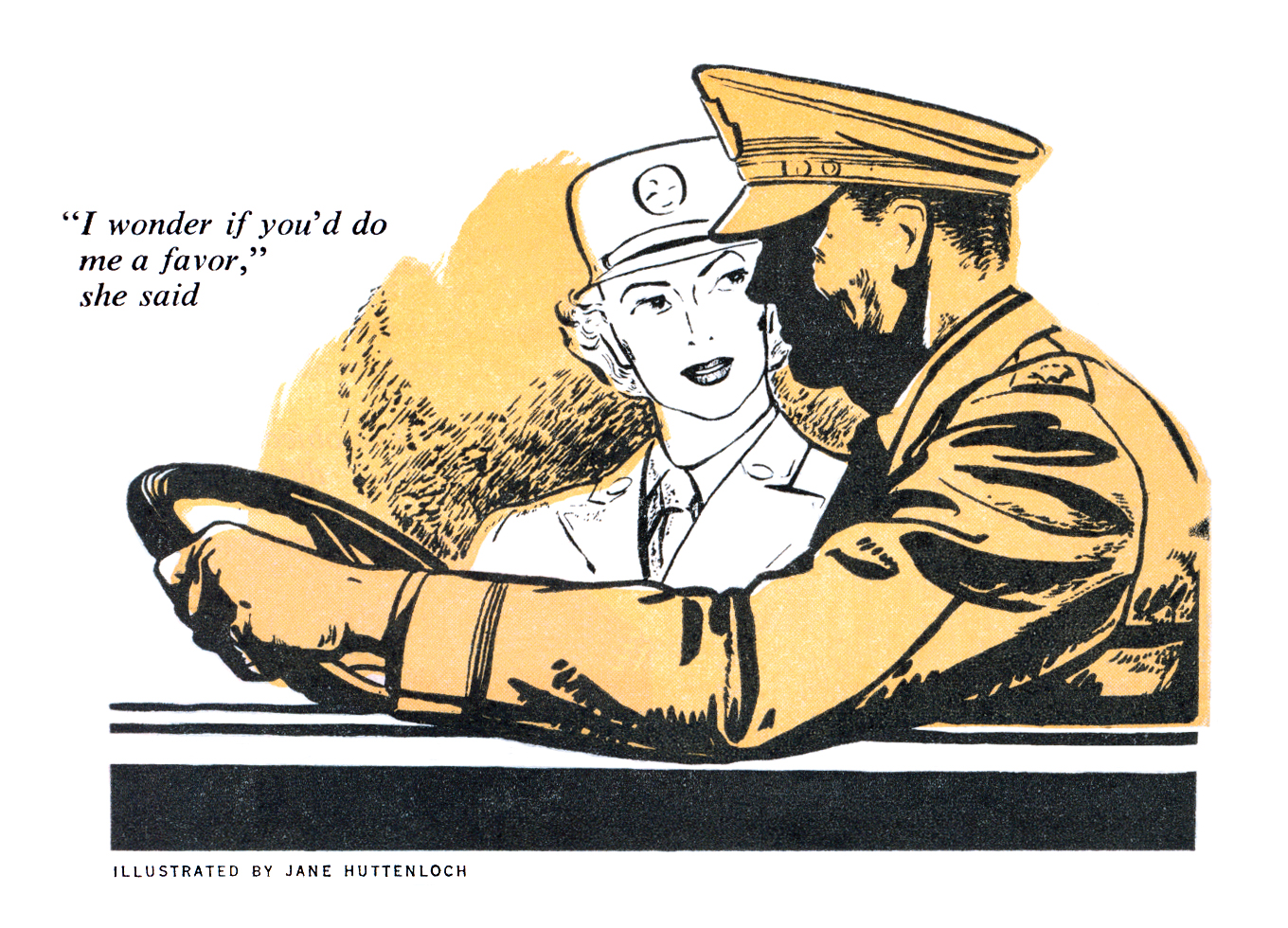
Jane Huttenloch illustrated "Booby Trap" for The American Magazine (August 1944)

Major Goodwin has been working for Army Intelligence for some time already, and has recently concluded a dangerous mission concerning another problem besides the Nazis: greed by munitions contractors jockeying for post-war power, in the present case by industrial espionage concerning an advanced type of grenade.

Archie has managed to unravel a major piece of the puzzle by a recent mission in the South. Another officer in his unit, Captain Cross, has just been murdered at a New York hotel, and Wolfe is investigating his murder. The remaining members of the unit, plus Wolfe and Congressman Shattuck, have gathered in the New York headquarters for the Army to discuss an anonymous letter that Shattuck, as Chairman of a Congressional war committee, has received about how industrial espionage is compromising the war effort and is therefore a national security matter.

Earlier, Archie was issued one of the advanced grenades in question which he kept in Wolfe's house, mostly as a souvenir. Wolfe does not like it in the house. Before the meeting starts, Archie returns the grenade to the Army at this meeting.

During the meeting, Colonel Rider, one of the officers whose son has just been killed in action in Europe, abruptly announces that he wants to go to Washington to confer with General Carpenter, the Pentagon official in charge of the unit. Rider has brought a suitcase with him, and his highly irregular request is granted. To Wolfe, it is highly irregular that Rider’s secretary is a female sergeant.

As Wolfe and Goodwin return to the building later on the same day, a massive explosion is heard. Colonel Rider is killed. As the building is not owned by Army Intelligence, the NYPD, in the shape of Inspector Cramer shows up, but Wolfe and Goodwin's uncooperativeness, normal as it has been in civilian matters, confuses Cramer now that Goodwin wears an Army uniform, the same that uniform Cramer's son is wearing in Australia.

Wolfe determines that Colonel Rider was murdered. His suitcase was rigged to pull the safety of that new grenade when he opened it the least bit. The remains of the suitcase are damaged from the inside outwards. Wolfe proceeds to invite those few who knew of the new design of grenade to his house. Each entered alone to see objects in the office, including another of the new grenades. Then they are all gathered together in the office, except for that female sergeant, where drawers are opened in turn, seeking the misplaced grenade. The Congressman reveals himself as the killer by his reactions to the trap set by Wolfe. He has murdered two soldiers, and is heavily involved with corruption during the war.

Wolfe and Archie drive him to a park to end his own life, rather than charge him in court in war time.

The story ends with Wolfe respecting that female sergeant for her bright moves. Archie takes another date to the Flamingo Club — and not Lily Rowan. Unlike a Sam Spade or Raymond Chandler story, any actual romantic impulses that Archie may have are cleared into the wings, and even this final action is not necessarily a celebration but may itself contribute to the war effort in its own small way.

== The unfamiliar word ==
"Nero Wolfe talks in a way that no human being on the face of the earth has ever spoken, with the possible exception of Rex Stout after he had a gin and tonic," said Michael Jaffe, executive producer of the A&E TV series, A Nero Wolfe Mystery. "Readers of the Wolfe saga often have to turn to the dictionary because of the erudite vocabulary of Wolfe and sometimes of Archie," wrote Rev. Frederick G. Gotwald.

Nero Wolfe's vocabulary is one of the hallmarks of the character. Examples of unfamiliar words — or unfamiliar uses of words that some would otherwise consider familiar — are found throughout the corpus, often in the give-and-take between Wolfe and Archie.

- Springe, chapter 8.

== Publication history ==
=== "Booby Trap" ===
The story was first published in 1944, The American Magazine, August 1944, in an abridged version. After the magazine edition, this story was published in one volume with Not Quite Dead Enough, on paper and as an audio book.

=== Not Quite Dead Enough ===
- 1944, New York: Farrar & Rinehart, September 7, 1944, hardcover

Contents include "Not Quite Dead Enough" and "Booby Trap"
In his limited-edition pamphlet, Collecting Mystery Fiction #9, Rex Stout's Nero Wolfe Part I, Otto Penzler describes the first edition of Not Quite Dead Enough: "Red cloth, front cover and spine printed with black; rear cover blank. Issued in a mainly black, red and blue pictorial dust wrapper. … The first edition has the publisher's monogram logo on the copyright page. the second printing, in the same year, is identical to the first except that the logo was dropped."
In April 2006, Firsts: The Book Collector's Magazine estimated that the first edition of Not Quite Dead Enough had a value of between $1,000 and $2,000.

- 1944, Toronto: Oxford University Press, 1944, hardcover
- 1944, New York: Detective Book Club #33, December 1944, hardcover
- 1944, New York: Detective Book Club, 1944, hardcover
- 1945, New York: Armed Services Edition #P-6, February 1945, paperback
- 1946, New York: Grosset & Dunlap, 1946, hardcover
- New York: Lawrence E. Spivak, Jonathan Press #J27, not dated, paperback
- 1949, New York: Dell mapback #267, 1949, paperback
- 1963, New York: Pyramid (Green Door) #R-822, February 1963, paperback
- 1992, New York: Bantam Crimeline ISBN 0-553-26109-6 October 1992, paperback, Rex Stout Library edition with introduction by John Lutz
- 1995, Burlington, Ontario: Durkin Hayes Publishing, DH Audio ISBN 0-88646-727-6 July 1994, audio cassette (unabridged, read by Saul Rubinek)
- 2004, Auburn, California: The Audio Partners Publishing Corp., Mystery Masters ISBN 1-57270-362-8 February 2004, audio CD (unabridged, read by Michael Prichard)
- 2010, New York: Bantam Crimeline ISBN 978-0-307-75607-7 May 26, 2010, e-book

== Adaptations ==
=== Nero Wolfe (Paramount Television) ===
"Booby Trap" is credited as the basis for the teleplay for "Gambit," the tenth episode of Nero Wolfe (1981), an NBC TV series starring William Conrad as Nero Wolfe and Lee Horsley as Archie Goodwin. Other members of the regular cast include George Voskovec (Fritz Brenner), Robert Coote (Theodore Horstmann), George Wyner (Saul Panzer) and Allan Miller (Inspector Cramer). Guest stars include Darren McGavin (John Alan Bredeman) and Patti Davis (Dana Groves). Directed by George McCowan from a teleplay by Stephen Kandel, "Gambit" aired April 3, 1981.
