= Adventure (1946 film) =

1946 American romantic drama film

- Theatrical release poster
- Directed by: Victor Fleming
- Screenplay by: Frederick Hazlitt Brennan; Vincent Lawrence
- Adaptation by: Anthony Veiller William H. Wright
- Based on: The Anointed; 1937 novel by Clyde Brion Davis
- Produced by: Sam Zimbalist
- Starring: Clark Gable; Greer Garson; Joan Blondell; Barbara Billingsley; Thomas Mitchell
- Cinematography: Joseph Ruttenberg
- Edited by: Frank Sullivan
- Music by: Herbert Stothart
- Production company: Metro-Goldwyn-Mayer
- Distributed by: Loew's Inc.
- Release dates: February 7, 1946 (New York City, premiere)
- Running time: 135 minutes
- Country: United States
- Language: English
- Budget: $3.5 million
- Box office: $6.1 million

Adventure is a 1946 American romantic drama film directed by Victor Fleming and starring Clark Gable and Greer Garson. Based on the 1937 novel The Anointed by Clyde Brion Davis, the film is about a sailor who falls in love with a librarian. Adventure was Gable's first postwar film and the tagline repeated in the movie's famous trailer was "Gable's back and Garson's got him!" Gable had suggested "He put the arson in Garson," while Garson proposed "She put the able in Gable."

== Plot ==
When his ship is torpedoed by a Japanese submarine, Harry Patterson, a World War II merchant marine boatswain, is cast adrift on a launch with a few of his shipmates. While Harry remains calm in the face of disaster, his friend Mudgin prays desperately, promising to avoid women, liquor, and fighting and to donate money to the church if they are saved. Harry finds Mudgin's pleas ridiculous, but no sooner does Mudgin complete his pact with God than a rescue plane appears on the horizon and the men are saved.

They are then deposited in San Francisco where they engage in "R&R" care, grooming, dinners, and fun to celebrate their rescue. Mudgin quickly breaks all his promises to God soon after and becomes depressed, certain that he has "lost his immortal soul on Powell Street."

Mudgin's shipmates laugh off his concerns, but Harry realizes that Mudgin is truly wracked with guilt and they take a walk, arriving at the city library, because Mudgin and Harry think there may be some helpful information on the subject of the human soul there.

Here, Harry and Mudgin meet the attractive, strait-laced librarian Emily Sears. Although intrigued by Emily, Harry repeatedly angers her with his wiseguy remarks and inappropriate behavior. However, his attention turns swiftly to her outgoing roommate, Helen Melohn, who has stopped in to walk her home. Harry and Helen decide to go on a date and convince a reluctant Emily to join them. At the restaurant, Emily stuns Harry when she abandons her reserved demeanor and orchestrates a bar fight. Astounded, Harry decides to pursue Emily's affections and arranges to meet the two women the following day to visit Emily's family farm, north of the city.

Charmed by Emily and her family farmhouse which includes the big bed in which she was born, Harry and Emily soon fall completely in love and get married in Reno in a wild expression of love of life. However, upon their return to her farm, he tells Emily that he will be shipping out in a few days, which comes as a shock to Emily, who promptly asks for a divorce, insisting that she is just being a free spirit and giving Harry his freedom, as the best expression of love. Harry sails away, and Emily and pals go back to Reno for the quick divorce. But in Reno, with "the girls", Emily faints - the doctor called declares that she is pregnant with Harry's child.

While docked in a South American port city, Mudgin falls off the ship and claims, before dying in Harry's arms, that his soul has been returned to him. A wise elderly gentleman, "Old" Ramon Estado (whose descendant, "Young" Ramon Estado, died in the ship disaster at the film's start), gives Harry a good talking to when Harry complains about his relationship with Emily.

Nine months after his departure, now ready to commit to love and marriage, Harry comes back to San Francisco and finds out from Helen that Emily has long since given up on him and went to her farm to give birth to his child - insisting the baby born in the same bed she was.

Harry follows and arrives just as Emily goes into labor, so the meeting and reunion are brief - there is just time to give Emily reason to hope in improvements in Harry's character; he shares sad news of Mudgin's death, but it was peaceful and happy because Mudgin says his soul returned and he'd now go to heaven.

Waiting, Harry paces outdoors with Emily upstairs in labor, until Helen calls him in saying that Emily is fine and that he has a little boy. Harry goes upstairs to the room across the bedroom set up to see to the baby. The child is stillborn, in spite of the efforts of Doctor, nurses and aide and Harry positions himself at the Doctor's side and won't be moved. The Doctor gives up trying to get the baby to breathe, but then Harry moves in and calls to the baby to breathe, and the baby does so miraculously.

In the hall, Helen hugs Harry as he races back across to Emily's side, thrilled to hear their baby, but she says she is just as moved to have heard Harry and his passion to save the child. They decide to call the baby Mudgin, after their lost friend, and the film closes as Harry and Emily share a kiss, with baby's cries in the background.

== Cast ==
- Clark Gable as Harry Patterson
- Greer Garson as Emily Sears
- Joan Blondell as Helen Melohn
- Thomas Mitchell as Mudgin
- Tom Tully as Gus
- John Qualen as Model T
- Richard Haydn as Limo
- Lina Romay as Maria
- Philip Merivale as "Old" Ramon Estado
- Harry Davenport as Dr. Ashlon
- Audrey Totter as Ethel (uncredited)
- Barbara Billingsley as Dame #2 (uncredited)
- Robert Emmet O'Connor as Man in Cantina (uncredited)
- Byron Foulger as Mr. Littleton (uncredited)
- Morris Ankrum as Mr. Ludlow (uncredited)
- Tito Renaldo as "Young" Ramon Estado
- Pierre Watkin as Mr. Buckley (uncredited)
- Betty Blythe as Mrs. Buckley (uncredited)

== Songs ==
source: AFI Catalog of Feature Films

- "Una Pena y un Carino" music by Herbert Stothart, lyrics by Frederick Hazlitt Brennan (music by Lily Pérez Freire and Mercedes Pérez Freire, lyrics by María Pascal Lyon)
- "Old McDonald Had a Farm"
- "El Yerbatero" music and lyrics by Perez Freire (music and lyrics by Nicanor Molinare )

== Reception ==
=== Box office ===
According to MGM records, Adventure earned $4,236,000 in the US and Canada and $1,848,000 elsewhere resulting in a profit of $478,000. It returned $4.5 million in distributor rentals in the United States and Canada.

=== Critical reaction ===
Bosley Crowther of The New York Times felt Adventure, with the star power of Garson and Gable, "is about as explosive as a slightly ancient egg" and blamed the "shamefully foolish script, and Victor Fleming, who surely knows better, directed in a shrill and clamorous style." Variety wrote: "Victor Fleming's direction always is topflight, his handling of tearjerker scenes being especially strong" despite "a rather inane title and a story that often is none too flattering to Gable". Harrison's Reports wrote: "Fortified with the combined drawing power of Clark Gable and Greer Garson, Adventure, a romantic melodrama, is sure to bring the masses to the theatres, and they will probably enjoy it because of the many emotional situations. But the story itself is antiquated and episodic, and at times too talky."

Edwin Schallert of the Los Angeles Times felt the film "was nothing short of terrific", though he noted the film "doesn't present Gable as engagingly as desirable even in rugged manner. Nor does the photography seem at all right in highlighting him as a screen presence." Time magazine wrote: "Adventure (M.G.M) brings ex-Major Clark Gable back to the screen and gives him Greer Garson as leading lady. In terms of marquee appeal, this combination generates high voltage. It also happens to generate as bright a piece of cinema comedy as has shown up this season."

This was the final film appearance of actress Claire McDowell who had been acting in films since the early silent era.
