= Aalma (dictionary) =

Detail from Saint-Omer 644. The large red B begins the word bubalus.

Illustrated opening page of the Aalma in Paris, BN lat. 13032

The Aalma (or Catholicon français) is an alphabetical Latin–Old French dictionary based on the Latin Catholicon of John Balbi. It is known from at least fourteen manuscripts with substantial variation between copies. The earliest copy dates from the late 14th century. Given the variation in manuscript, the Aalma is more properly a "family of dictionary texts", called the "Aalma series" or "Aalma group".

Compared to the Catholicon, the definitions in the Aalma are much shorter. The fullest manuscript is Paris, BN lat. 13032. The first lemma is aalma (virge secrete ou sainte) and the last is zucara (succres, une espice). Lat. 13032 contains 331 pages with two columns per page and 36 lines per column. It was published by Mario Roques in 1938. Roques identified "a reduced version" of the Aalma as the basis of the first printed Latin–French dictionary, the Catholicon abbreviatum (c. 1482).

== List of manuscripts ==
The fourteen known manuscripts are:

1. Paris, BN lat. 13032
2. Paris, BN lat. 17881
3. Paris, BN lat. 14748
4. Paris, BN lat. 7679
5. Exeter, Cath. Libr., 3517
6. Salins, BM, MS 44
7. Lille, BM, MS 147 (olim 388)
8. Metz, BM, MS 510
9. Saint-Omer, BM, MS 644
10. Troyes, BM, MS 1459
11. Angers, BM, MS 417
12. Épinal, BM, MS 224
13. Metz, BM, MS 1182
14. Paris, BN nouv.acq.fr. 24398

== Bibliography ==
- Shaw, Jean Florence (1997). Contributions to a Study of the Printed Dictionary in France before 1539 (PhD diss.). University of Toronto.
- Merrilees, Brian (2011). "'Copiste et compilateur': Transmission and Individuality in Medieval Glossaries". In Catherine M. Jones (ed.). "Li premerains vers": Essays in Honor of Keith Busby. Brill. pp. 281–290.
- Merrilees, Brian; Edwards, William; Grondeux, Anne, eds. (2019). Le dictionnaire Aalma: Les versions Saint-Omer, BM 644, Exeter, Cath. Libr. 3517 et Paris, BnF lat. 13032. Brepols.
