= Black Orchids =

1942 novella collection by Rex Stout

- Author: Rex Stout
- Cover artist: Alan Harmon
- Language: English
- Series: Nero Wolfe
- Genre: Detective fiction
- Publisher: Farrar & Rinehart
- Publication date: May 21, 1942
- Publication place: United States
- Media type: Print (hardcover)
- Pages: 272 pp. (first edition)
- OCLC: 4547020
- Preceded by: Where There's a Will
- Followed by: Not Quite Dead Enough

Black Orchids is a Nero Wolfe double mystery by Rex Stout published in 1942 by Farrar & Rinehart, Inc. Stout's first short story collection, the volume is composed of two novellas that had appeared in abridged form in The American Magazine:

- "Black Orchids" (August 1941, abridged as "Death Wears an Orchid")
- "Cordially Invited to Meet Death" (April 1942, abridged as "Invitation to Murder")

== Reviews and commentary ==
- Jacques Barzun and Wendell Hertig Taylor, A Catalogue of Crime — In the first, Wolfe and Archie are in fine form, and murder at a flower show provides a suitable background for Wolfe's talents and predatory instincts. Archie himself innocently pulls the trigger. The second story is less satisfactory, involving as it does a highly debatable move by the murderer to disarm suspicion. Besides, too many animals.
- Time, "Murder in May" (June 1, 1942) — Nero Wolfe and his ebullient amanuensis Archie Goodwin are here at top form in two "novellas" — "Black Orchids" and "Cordially Invited to Meet Death." The first concerns a cleverly contrived murder at New York's annual Flower Show. The second features an adroit bit of poisoning in the fantastic Riverdale ménage — and menagerie — of a successful party-arranger for Manhattan society. First-class entertainment.

== Publication history ==
- 1942, New York: Farrar & Rinehart, May 21, 1942, hardcover

In his limited-edition pamphlet, Collecting Mystery Fiction #9, Rex Stout's Nero Wolfe Part I, Otto Penzler describes the first edition of Black Orchids: "Brick brown cloth, front cover and spine printed with black; rear cover blank. Issued in a brick brown and green pictorial dust wrapper … The first edition has the publisher's monogram logo on the copyright page."
In April 2006, Firsts: The Book Collector's Magazine estimated that the first edition of Black Orchids had a value of between $3,000 and $5,000. The estimate is for a copy in very good to fine condition in a like dustjacket.

- 1942, Toronto: Oxford University Press, 1942, hardcover
- 1942, New York: Detective Book Club #5, August 1942, hardcover
- 1943, London: Collins Crime Club, July 5, 1943, hardcover
- 1943, New York: Grosset & Dunlap, 1943, hardcover
- 1945, Cleveland, Ohio: World Publishing Company, a Tower Book, March 1945, hardcover
- 1946, New York: Avon #95, 1946, paperback
- 1956, New York: Avon #714, 1956, paperback
- 1963, New York: Pyramid (Green Door) #R-917, September 1963, paperback
- 1992, New York: Bantam Crimeline ISBN 0-553-25719-6 May 1992, trade paperback
- 1996, Burlington, Ontario: Durkin Hayes Publishing, DH Audio, "Black Orchids" ISBN 0-88646-889-2 December 1996, audio cassette (unabridged, read by Saul Rubinek)
- 1998, Burlington, Ontario: Durkin Hayes Publishing, DH Audio ISBN 0-88646-472-2 August 1998, audio cassette (unabridged, read by David Elias), "Cordially Invited to Meet Death"
- 2009, New York: Bantam Dell Publishing Group (with The Silent Speaker) ISBN 978-0-553-38655-4 August 25, 2009, trade paperback
- 2010, New York: Bantam Crimeline ISBN 0-307-75573-8 June 30, 2010, e-book
