= Clyde Brion Davis =

American journalist

- Born: May 22, 1894; Unadilla, Nebraska
- Died: July 19, 1962 (aged 68); Salisbury, Connecticut
- Occupations: Journalist, author
- Spouse: Martha Wirt
- Children: David Brion Davis
- Writing career
- Notable works: The Anointed; The Great American Novel

Clyde Brion Davis (May 22, 1894 – July 19, 1962) was an American writer and freelance journalist active from the mid-1920s until his death. He is best known for his novels The Anointed and The Great American Novel, though he wrote more than 15 books.

== Life and career ==
Clyde Brion Davis was born on May 22, 1894, in Unadilla, Nebraska, to Charles Nelson and Isabel Brion Davis. His father was a friend and strong supporter of the legendary Nebraska politician William Jennings Bryan. A year after the boy's birth, the Davis family moved to Missouri, where Davis attended schools in Chillicothe and Kansas City. At 14, he quit school and was employed in several jobs including printer's apprentice, steamfitter's helper, chimney sweep, electrician, detective and journalist.

In 1916, Davis gained his first experience in journalism, working with the Denver Times and Albuquerque Morning Journal. He acquired further experience in journalism writing for the Army newspaper The Pontanezan Duckboard while serving in the United States Army Intelligence Corps (1917–1919) during World War I. Upon his return to the United States, Davis, with the exception of a few months working for the Burns Detective Agency, spent the years between 1919 and 1937 working for various newspapers, including Denver Post (1919), Rocky Mountain News (1920–1922), San Francisco Examiner (1921), Seattle Post-Intelligencer (1930), and Buffalo Times (1931–1937).

Davis' fiction efforts were first published by a number of pulp magazines during the 1920s.

In 1926, he married artist and writer Martha Wirt. Their only child, historian David Brion Davis, was born on February 16, 1927, in Denver, Colorado.

Davis resided in Hamburg, New York in the late 1930s. He wrote a number of novels and short stories before the publication of his novel The Anointed in 1937. The Book of the Month Club chose The Anointed as its selection for August 1937 and MGM adapted the novel in 1945 to the MGM movie Adventure starring Clark Gable and Greer Garson. Following the success of The Anointed, Davis left journalism for a career in creative writing. For the most part he focused on writing novels and short stories, other than a brief period of syndicate work in Europe for PM and Knight newspapers in 1941, two months in Hollywood as a screenwriter, and two years as an associate editor for Rinehart and Company (1943–1945). Davis was awarded a Huntington Hartford fellowship for the years 1956–1957. Over his career, he wrote more than 20 novels, including The Great American Novel (1938) and The Rebellion of Leo Maguire (1944).

The Anointed is about an uneducated egotist who, convinced God has some great purpose in view for him, travels the globe and then takes up book-learning to discover what it is. The Great American Novel (1938) is a humorous novel about a newspaperman who dreams of writing the Great American Novel, but never has the time.

His memoir The Age of Indiscretion (1950) was a curmudgeonly retort to nostalgia for the "good old days" circa 1900. He argued that the America of the mid-20th century was not only richer and healthier than the America of his boyhood, but also happier and more moral.

In 1946, Davis and his family moved to Salisbury, Connecticut, where he was an active citizen serving as Justice of the Peace between 1947 and 1957, until his death in Salisbury on July 19, 1962. His last novel, Shadow of a Day, was published posthumously.

== Partial bibliography ==
Fiction

- The Anointed (Farrar & Rinehart, New York, 1937)
- The Great American Novel (Farrar & Rinehart, New York, 1938)
- Northend Wildcats (Farrar & Rinehart, New York, 1938)
- Sullivan (Farrar & Rinehart, New York, 1940)
- Follow the Leader (Farrar & Rinehart, New York, 1942)
- The Rebellion of Leo McGuire (Farrar & Rinehart, New York, 1944)
- Stars Incline (Farrar & Rinehart, New York, 1946)
- Adventure (The World Publishing Company, New York, 1946) – a reissue of The Anointed
- Jeremy Bell (Farrar & Rinehart, New York, 1947)
- Temper the Wind (The Philadelphia Inquirer, September 26, 1948) (a Gold Seal Novel)
- Playtime is Over (Arthur Barker, 1950)
- Thudbury: An American Comedy (Lippincott, Philadelphia, 1952)
- Unholy Uproar, a novel (Lippincott, Philadelphia, 1957)
- The Big Pink Kite (John Day Company, New York, 1960)
- Shadow of A Day (John Day Company, New York, 1963)

Non-Fiction

- The Arkansas (Farrar & Rinehart, New York, 1940) (Rivers of America Series)
- Nebraska Coast (Farrar & Rinehart, New York, 1939)
- The Age of Indiscretion (Lippincott, Philadelphia, 1950)

Short stories

- "From Peter to Paul and Back" (Top-Notch, June 15, 1920)
- "The Hay Fever Handicap" (Argosy All-Story Weekly, September 21, 1929)
- "The Lumberjack Telegrapher" (Frontier Stories, January 1929)
- "Payday" (The American Magazine, November 1938)
- "Something for Nothing" (The Magazine of Fantasy and Science Fiction, August 1955)

Archives

- Clyde Brion Davis Papers. YCAL MSS 255. Beinecke Rare Book and Manuscript Library, Yale University.
