= Not Quite Dead Enough =

Nero Wolfe double mystery by Rex Stout (1944)

- Author: Rex Stout
- Cover artist: Max Glick
- Language: English
- Series: Nero Wolfe
- Genre: Detective novel
- Publisher: Farrar & Rinehart
- Publication date: September 7, 1944
- Publication place: United States
- Media type: Print (hardcover)
- Pages: 220 (first edition)
- OCLC: 734079995
- Preceded by: Black Orchids
- Followed by: The Silent Speaker

Not Quite Dead Enough is a Nero Wolfe double mystery, a short story collection, by Rex Stout published in 1944 by Farrar & Rinehart, Inc. The volume contains two novellas that first appeared in The American Magazine:

- "Not Quite Dead Enough (novella)" (abridged, December 1942)
- "Booby Trap (novella)" (August 1944)

In these two stories Archie Goodwin, Wolfe's live-in employee in all the other Nero Wolfe stories, wears the uniform of the United States Army. The plot summary and characters in each novella are found at the separate articles above.

== Reviews and commentary ==
- Jacques Barzun and Wendell Hertig Taylor, A Catalogue of Crime — Neither is to be missed by anyone with an interest in the Wolfe-Goodwin saga. In this one Archie has to incriminate himself to get Wolfe to abandon physical training and get back to ratiocination and both help win the war. Full of amusing characters and with more action and fewer words than is sometimes true of the longer tales. ... Nero Wolfe does a neat job of selecting the culprit by arranging a booby trap of his own. The final scene, in which Wolfe plays God, is unique: no beer, no audience except Archie (a major of three weeks' standing), and the murderer in a car in Van Cortlandt Park.

== Publication history ==
- 1944, New York: Farrar & Rinehart, September 7, 1944, hardcover

In his limited-edition pamphlet, Collecting Mystery Fiction #9, Rex Stout's Nero Wolfe Part I, Otto Penzler describes the first edition of Not Quite Dead Enough: "Red cloth, front cover and spine printed with black; rear cover blank. Issued in a mainly black, red and blue pictorial dust wrapper. … The first edition has the publisher's monogram logo on the copyright page. the second printing, in the same year, is identical to the first except that the logo was dropped."
In April 2006, Firsts: The Book Collector's Magazine estimated that the first edition of Not Quite Dead Enough had a value of between $1,000 and $2,000.

Armed Services Edition P-6 was published by the Council on Books in Wartime and made available to the Armed Forces of the United States in December 1944

- 1944, Toronto: Oxford University Press, 1944, hardcover
- 1944, New York: Detective Book Club #33, December 1944, hardcover
- 1944, New York: Detective Book Club, 1944, hardcover
- 1944, Armed Services Edition #P-6, December 1944, paperback
- 1945, Armed Services Edition #906, November 1945, paperback
- 1946, New York: Grosset & Dunlap, 1946, hardcover
- 1947, New York: Lawrence E. Spivak, Jonathan Press #J27, not dated, digest paperback
- 1949, New York: Dell mapback #267, 1949, paperback
- 1963, New York: Pyramid (Green Door) #R-822, February 1963, paperback
- 1979, New York: Jove Books, paperback
- 1982, New York: Bantam Books, paperback
- 1992, New York: Bantam Crimeline ISBN 0-553-26109-6 October 1992, paperback, Rex Stout Library edition with introduction by John Lutz
- 1995, Burlington, Ontario: Durkin Hayes Publishing, DH Audio ISBN 0-88646-727-6 July 1994, audio cassette (unabridged, read by Saul Rubinek)
- 2004, Auburn, California: The Audio Partners Publishing Corp., Mystery Masters ISBN 1-57270-362-8 February 2004, audio CD (unabridged, read by Michael Prichard)
- 2010, New York: Bantam Crimeline ISBN 978-0-307-75607-7 May 26, 2010, e-book
