= John Balbi =

John Balbi or John of Genoa (died c. 1298) was an Italian grammarian and Dominican priest.

At an advanced age, John gave away his wealth to the poor of Genoa and entered the Order of St Dominic. He is best known for his Latin grammar, Summa Grammaticalis, better known as the Catholicon, apparently the first Latin lexicographical work "to achieve complete alphabetization (from the first to the last letter of each word)." This work is made up of treatises on orthography, etymology, grammar, prosody, rhetoric, and an etymological dictionary of the Latin language (primae, mediae et infimae Latinitatis). It was highly respected as a textbook for over a century after its publication, and received both excessive criticism and excessive praise. Erasmus was particularly critical of the work, criticizing it in his works De Ratione Studiorum and Colloquia. Leandro Alberti wrote a defense of the Catholicon in response to these attacks.

Peter Schöffer and Johann Fust published the Catholicon in 1450, and it was several times republished.

Besides the Catholicon, John also wrote Liber Theologiae qui vocatur Dialogus de Quaestionibus Animae ad Spiritum and Quoddam opus ad inveniendum festa mobilia. A Postilla super Joannem and a Tractatus de Omnipotentia Dei have also been attributed to him.
