= Catholicon (electuary) =

Historical medicine

In pre-modern medicine, catholicon was a soft electuary, so called as being supposedly universal in its curative and prophylactic abilities (see panacea); or a purger of all humours.

== Example recipes ==
Different authors have given different recipes for catholicon. That called Catholicon Nicholai was the most common in use; it consisted of sixteen ingredients, the chief being tamarinds, cassia, senna, and rhubarb. It was said to be double (catholicon duplicatum or duplex) when there was a double portion of senna and rhubarb. The catholicon for clysters, which was injected into the rectum, only differed from this in that it had no rhubarb, and that honey was used instead of sugar when mixing the drug with water in forming the electuary.

An example recipe for catholicon duplicatum follows:

The Double Catholicon of Nicolai, or Compound Electuary of Rhubarb, prepared by simmering over a slow fire half a pound of polypody root; 2 ounces of succory root; 1 ounce of liquorice root; 3 ounces of the leaves of agrimony and spleen wort; 6 pounds of water till reduced two-thirds; then add 6 drachms [3/4 ounce] of fennel-seeds, strain and add 4 pounds of sugar, boil to the consistence of syrup, and add 4 ounces each of extract of cassia and pulp of tamarinds. Then add by degrees 4 ounces each of powdered rhubarb and senna leaves, 1 ounce of liquorice root, 2 ounces of seeds of violet, 1 ounce of the four cold seeds [pumpkin, gourd, melon, cucumber], half an ounce of fennel-seeds, and mix and form an electuary. It is too troublesome in the preparation to be much used. Without the rhubarb, and with honey instead of sugar, it forms a good enema.

Spirit of Mindererus, a solution of ammonium acetate in alcohol, was also considered a catholicon among pre-modern surgeons.

== Women ==
The term catholicon also specifically referred to remedies for women. For example, aurum vitae, or the gold of life, was a panacean catholicon used in the mid-18th century and later. It consisted of gold and corrosive sublimate.

== Decline ==
By the 19th century, catholicons had fallen into disuse.

== Quotations ==
Death is the cure of all diseases. There is no catholicon or universal remedy I know, but this, which though nauseous to queasy stomachs, yet to prepared appetites is nectar, and a pleasant potion of immortality.

— Religio Medici by Sir Thomas Browne

Besides, on the said date, a good cleaning clyster, composed of double catholicon, rhubarb, with honey of roses, and other ingredients, according to prescription, to scour, wash and clean the lower abdomen of Mr. Argan, thirty sols.

— The Imaginary Invalid by Molière
