= Catholicon (1286) =

13th-century Latin dictionary

The Summa grammaticalis quae vocatur Catholicon, or Catholicon (from the Greek Καθολικόν, universal), is a 13th-century Latin dictionary which found wide use throughout Latin Christendom. Some of the entries contain encyclopedic information, and a Latin grammar is also included. The work was created by John Balbi, a Dominican from Genoa, who finished it on March 7, 1286. The work served in the late Middle Ages to interpret the Bible. The Catholicon was one of the first books to be printed, using the new printing technology of Johannes Gutenberg in 1460.

It should be distinguished from Lagadeuc's Catholicon, a Latin-Breton-French dictionary compiled in 1464 by a priest of Tréguier called Jehan Lagadeuc which was published 5 November 1499 (the first printed French dictionary and the first ever trilingual dictionary).

== Editio princeps ==
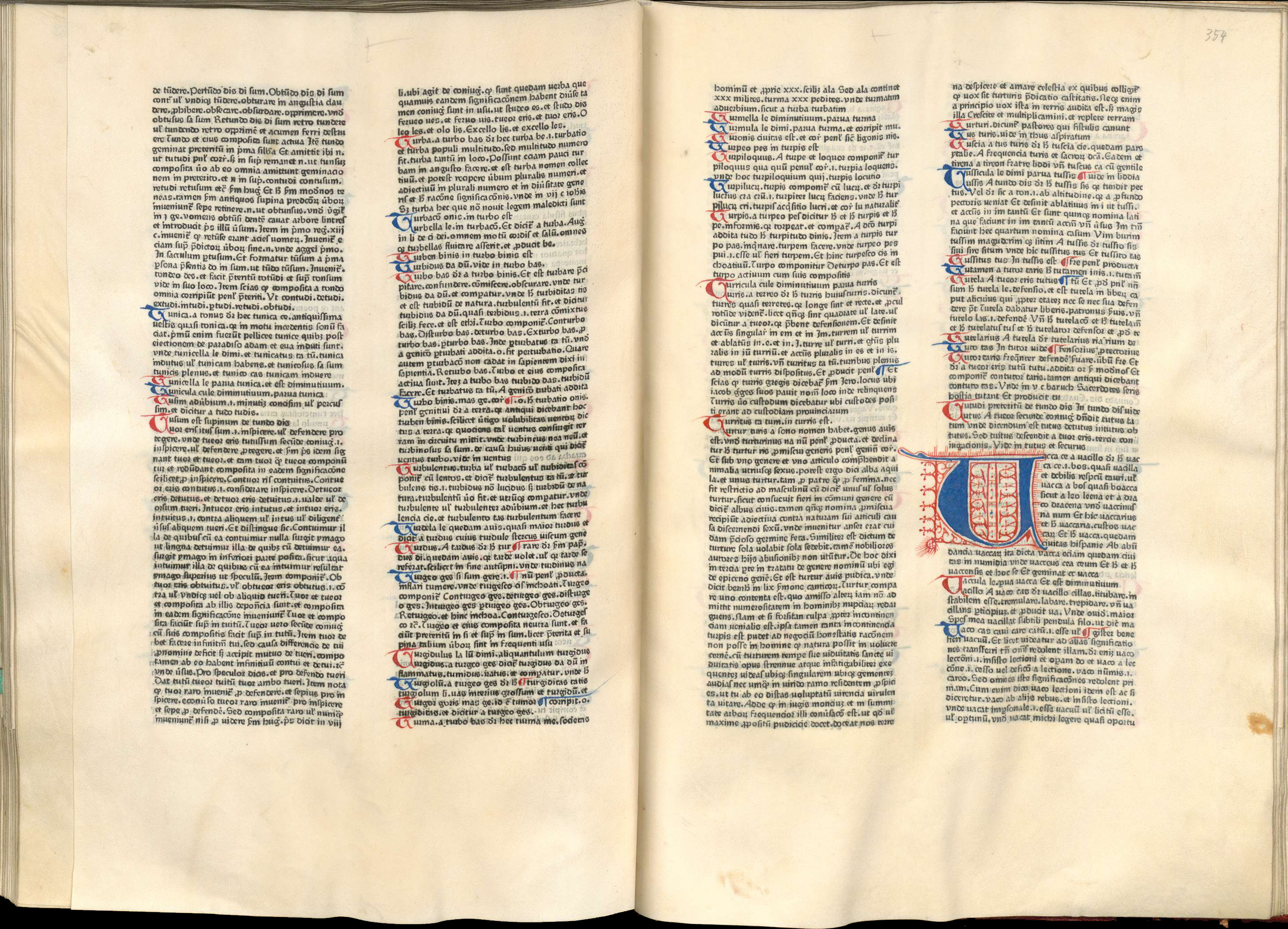
Entries for the letters T and U in a Bayerische Staatsbibliothek's copy of the Catholicon (f. 353 verso, 354 recto)

The Catholicon was one of the first books to be printed, using the new printing technology of Johannes Gutenberg, with the date 1460; it is unclear who did the printing though Gutenberg himself was once regarded as the printer responsible. It was printed with a newly cut bastarda, a small but easily readable, still gothically influenced, printing type, using sixty-six lines of forty letters in each column.

The Catholicon was printed in three impressions, which, on the basis of the papers used, can be assigned to the years around 1460, 1469 and 1472. The typesetting of these three impressions is almost identical. For the explanation of this phenomenon the historian of printing Lotte Hellinga puts forward the thesis that the Catholicon was printed in the same year (around 1469), but on three different presses by three different printers, who cooperated in a joint venture. Mosley suggests that the book may have been printed using metal types wired together in two-line units. Paul Needham has presented the revolutionary theory that the Catholicon was printed by means of two-line stereotypes or "slugs", a technology not documented in any form until after 1700.

The correct attribution of the Catholicon to its printers is one of the knotty problems of incunabula research.

The colophon of the book (in Latin) refers to the technology used: "With the help of the Most High ... this noble book Catholicon has been printed and accomplished without the help of reed, stylus or pen but by the wondrous agreement, proportion and harmony of punches and types, in the year of our Lord's incarnation 1460 in the noble city of Mainz of the renowned German nation ...". S. H. Steinberg in his book Five Hundred Years of Printing (1955) makes these observations "the type is about a third smaller than that of the 42-line Bible; it is considerably more economical and thus marks an important step towards varying as well as cheapening book-production by the careful choice of type"; "the book contains a colophon which it is difficult to believe to have been written by anybody but the inventor of printing himself".

A summary of the problem is to be found in (only in German): Andreas Venzke: Johannes Gutenberg – Der Erfinder des Buchdrucks und seine Zeit. Piper-Verlag, Munich, 2000.
