= Fred Ludekens =

American artist and illustrator

Fred Ludekens (1900–1982) was an American artist and illustrator. He was born in Hueneme, California, on May 13, 1900, and grew up in California. He worked on fishing boats for a while, and then moved to San Francisco at the age of 20. Although he had no formal training in art, he found work as a billboard painter. He joined the advertising agency of Lord & Thomas in 1931, and transferred to the company's New York City office in 1939. He returned to San Francisco in 1945, and remained there until his death. Ludekens worked in a variety of media, often depicting rural scenes such as fruit ranches, coastal scenes, and the Indians of the Southwest. He produced story, article and cover illustrations for magazines such as The Saturday Evening Post, The American Magazine, Good Housekeeping, The Country Gentleman, Fortune and True. During the 1950s he produced a series of paintings to be used in advertisements for the Weyerhaeuser Timber Company. These paintings were of wildlife scenes as well as some depicting famous foresters such as Aldo Leopold and William B. Greeley. He also illustrated many books over the course of his life, and was a member of the founding faculty for the Famous Artists School.
