= Gold Seal Novel =

Illustrated novels

Gold Seal Novels are illustrated novels covering a wide range of genres published in editions of the Sunday Philadelphia Inquirer between 1934 and 1949. They were published as a "complete illustrated novel" as a section of the newspaper's Sunday edition. Authors include John Dickson Carr, Clyde Brion Davis, Erle Stanley Gardner, Graham Greene, Fannie Hurst, Frances Parkinson Keyes, Sinclair Lewis, Philip MacDonald, Cecile Hulse Matschat, Mary O'Hara, Ellery Queen, Georges Simenon, Rex Stout, and Eudora Welty.

To date, 382 Gold Seal Novels have been cataloged by collectors.
