= Die Like a Dog =

- Short story by Rex Stout
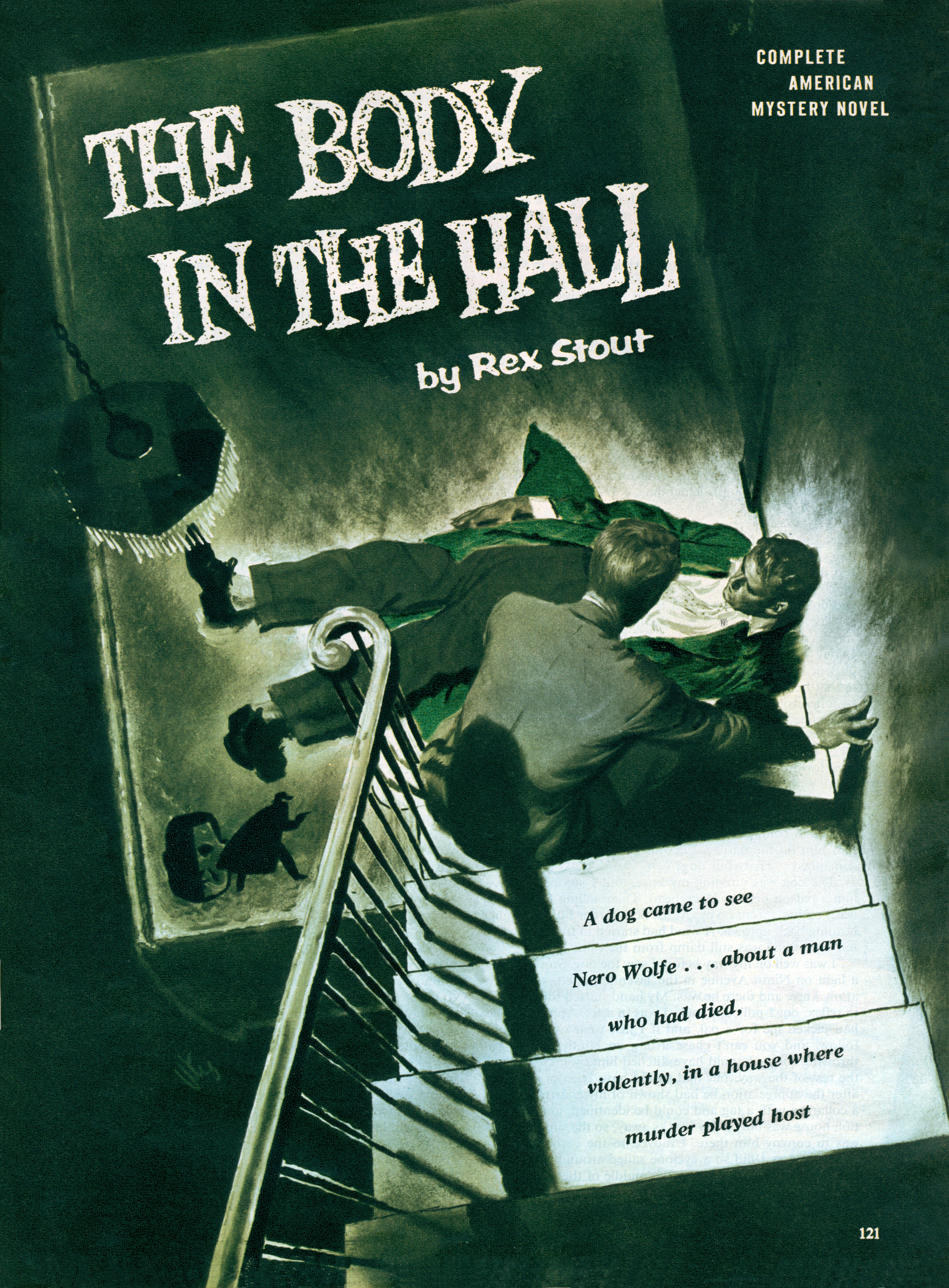
- Illustrated by Thornton Utz
- Original title: The Body in the Hall
- Country: United States
- Language: English
- Genre: Detective fiction

Publication
- Published in: The American Magazine
- Publication type: Periodical
- Publication date: December 1954
- Series: Nero Wolfe

"Die Like a Dog" is a Nero Wolfe mystery novella written by American writer Rex Stout, first published as "The Body in the Hall" in the December 1954 issue of The American Magazine. It first appeared in book form in the short-story collection Three Witnesses, published by the Viking Press in 1956.

== Plot summary ==
It's a rainy day in Manhattan, and Richard Meegan has grabbed the wrong raincoat after getting the brushoff from Nero Wolfe. Meegan came to the brownstone to hire Wolfe, apparently on the sort of marital matter that Wolfe won't touch. Now Archie Goodwin wants to get his raincoat back: it's newer than the one Meegan left behind.

As Archie approaches Meegan's small apartment house on Arbor Street in the Village, he sees police near the front, including Sgt. Purley Stebbins. Opting for discretion, Archie starts back home when he realizes he's being tailed by a friendly black Labrador. It's windy enough that Archie's hat blows off his head and across the street, but the dog risks its life retrieving it. After that, Archie can't bring himself to shoo the dog, so he takes him back to the brownstone.

And there, in the office, Archie discovers that Wolfe likes dogs. With what passes in Wolfe for fondness, he recalls that he had a mutt in Montenegro, one with a rather narrow skull. This Labrador has a much broader skull – Wolfe asserts that it's for brain room, and decides that the dog is to be named Jet. Then Fritz reports that Jet has excellent manners in the kitchen. Wolfe has one-upped Archie once again: he would enjoy keeping the dog, but can blame Archie for any problem it causes.

Now Cramer appears at the front door, wanting to know about a dog. A man named Philip Kampf was murdered in the Arbor Street apartment house. Kampf had owned a black Labrador, and a policeman noticed that the dog left with Goodwin. Hence Cramer's questions: Meegan, who saw Wolfe that morning, lives in the apartment house where Kampf was murdered, and Archie has Kampf's dog. Wolfe and Archie describe the day's events for Cramer, who wants more but will wait until the next day.

That evening, looking for a rationale to keep Jet, Wolfe sends Archie for Richard Meegan. But Meegan doesn't answer the buzzer, and when another man leaves the apartment house, Archie follows him.

Archie catches up, introduces himself, and points out that the man's being followed by a police detective. Grateful, the man introduces himself as Victor Talento. Archie wants to know where he's going, and Talento tells him that he's meeting a young woman. Her name is Jewel Jones, and Talento asks Archie to go in his place, and tell her that Talento couldn't make it – Talento doesn't want the police to see them meet.

Archie agrees, meets up with Miss Jones, and since he can't bring Meegan to Wolfe, brings her instead. When they enter Wolfe's office, all three get a surprise: Jet, who has been keeping Wolfe company, runs to Miss Jones and stands in front of her, wagging his tail.

So she knows Jet, and therefore Kampf, and Wolfe pries it out of her that she knew him intimately – and in fact lived for almost a year in the Arbor Street apartment house where Kampf was killed. She knows, less well, three of the men who live there: Talento, Jerome Åland, and Ross Chaffee.

Archie interviews Åland, Meegan and Chaffee separately. From Meegan he learns more about his reason for seeing Wolfe: Meegan comes from Pittsburgh, and his wife left him – completely disappeared – about a year earlier. Not long ago Meegan saw a painting of a woman in a Pittsburgh museum, and he's sure it was his wife. He tracked down the artist, Ross Chaffee, and asked him about the model he used. Chaffee couldn't remember the model, but Meegan did not believe him and, to stay close by, rented the empty apartment in the Arbor Street building where Chaffee lives.

Archie takes a blind, but successful, stab at finding the painting and learns that it belongs to a Manhattan collector. He calls on the collector, gets a look at the painting, and sees in it a woman who looks a lot like Jewel Jones. Archie brings her to the office. Informed that she sat for the painting, and is therefore Meegan's missing wife, Wolfe speaks with Chaffee by phone. He threatens to turn Miss Jones over to the police but gives Chaffee the option of bringing the other three tenants with him to Wolfe's office.

With the Arbor Street residents collected, Wolfe zeros in on the murderer, and along the way explains the dog's strange behavior, particularly that it followed Archie from the apartment house.

== Cast of characters ==
- Nero Wolfe — The private investigator
- Archie Goodwin — Wolfe's assistant, and the narrator of all Wolfe stories
- Philip Kampf — The murder victim
- Jet — Kampf's Labrador. Also known as Bootsy
- Richard Meegan — A man searching for his wife
- Victor Talento, Jerome Åland and Ross Chaffee — Residents of the apartment house where Kampf was murdered
- Jewel Jones — Nightclub singer and close friend of Kampf
- Inspector Cramer, Sergeant Stebbins and Sergeant Loftus — Representing Manhattan Homicide

== The unfamiliar word ==
"Nero Wolfe talks in a way that no human being on the face of the earth has ever spoken, with the possible exception of Rex Stout after he had a gin and tonic," said Michael Jaffe, executive producer of the A&E TV series, A Nero Wolfe Mystery.

Examples of unfamiliar words — or unfamiliar uses of words that some would otherwise consider familiar — are found throughout the corpus, often in the give-and-take between Wolfe and Archie.

- Replevin. Chapter 2.
- Demirep. Chapter 3.
- Prepossession. Chapter 7.

== Publication history ==
=== "Die Like a Dog" ===
- 1954, The American Magazine, December 1954 (as "The Body in the Hall")
- 1956, Ellery Queen's Mystery Magazine, February 1956 (as "A Dog in the Daytime")
- 1959, Best Detective Stories, ed. by Edmund Crispin, London: Faber and Faber, 1959 (as "A Dog in the Daytime")
- 1959, Ten Great Mysteries, ed. by Howard Haycraft and John Beecroft, New York: Doubleday, 1959
- 1965, Ellery Queen's Anthology, 1965
- 1979, Masterpieces of Murder: The Grand Masters Up to Date, ed. by Ellery Queen, New York: Davis Publications, 1979

=== Three Witnesses ===
- 1956, New York: Viking Press, March 10, 1956, hardcover

Contents include "The Next Witness", "When a Man Murders" and "Die Like a Dog".
In his limited-edition pamphlet, Collecting Mystery Fiction #10, Rex Stout's Nero Wolfe Part II, Otto Penzler describes the first edition of Three Witnesses: "Pale blue cloth, front cover and spine printed with gold; front and rear covers blank. Issued in a red, black and white dust wrapper."
In April 2006, Firsts: The Book Collector's Magazine estimated that the first edition of Three Witnesses had a value of between $200 and $350. The estimate is for a copy in very good to fine condition in a like dustjacket.

- 1956, Toronto: Macmillan, 1956, hardcover
- 1956, New York: Viking Press (Mystery Guild), June 1956, hardcover

The far less valuable Viking book club edition may be distinguished from the first edition in three ways:

- The dust jacket has "Book Club Edition" printed on the inside front flap, and the price is absent (first editions may be price clipped if they were given as gifts).
- Book club editions are sometimes thinner and always taller (usually a quarter of an inch) than first editions.
- Book club editions are bound in cardboard, and first editions are bound in cloth (or have at least a cloth spine).

- 1956, London: Collins Crime Club, October 22, 1956, hardcover
- 1957, New York: Bantam Books, July 1957, paperback
- 1965, New York: Viking Press, Royal Flush (with Fer-de-Lance and Murder by the Book), July 23, 1965, hardcover
- 1976, London: Hamish Hamilton, 1976
- 1994, New York: Bantam Crimeline ISBN 0-553-24959-2 October 1994, paperback, Rex Stout Library edition with introduction by Susan Conant
- 1997, Newport Beach, California: Books on Tape, Inc. ISBN 0-7366-3751-6 July 21, 1997, audio cassette (unabridged, read by Michael Prichard)
- 2010, New York: Bantam Crimeline ISBN 978-0-307-75625-1 June 9, 2010, e-book

== Adaptations ==
=== Nero Wolfe (A&E Network) ===
Archie Goodwin (Timothy Hutton) fetches volatile demirep Jewel Jones (Kari Matchett) for a meeting with Nero Wolfe in A&E's 16:9 letterboxed version of "Die Like a Dog"

"Die Like a Dog" was adapted for the second season of the A&E TV series A Nero Wolfe Mystery (2001–2002). Written by Sharon Elizabeth Doyle and directed by James Tolkan, the episode made its debut April 28, 2002, on A&E. The soundtrack includes music by Antonín Dvořák (titles) and Michael Small.

Timothy Hutton and Maury Chaykin star as Archie Goodwin and Nero Wolfe. Other members of the cast of "Die Like a Dog," in credits order, include Colin Fox (Fritz Brenner), Bill Smitrovich (Inspector Cramer), Kari Matchett (Jewel Jones), James Tolkan (Loftus the dog expert), R.D. Reid (Sergeant Purley Stebbins), Steve Cumyn (Ross Chaffee), Julian Richings (Jerome Åland), Bill MacDonald (Richard Meegan) and Alex Poch-Goldin (Victor Talento). The Labrador Retriever "Jet" (Jesse) is from the BRB K9 kennels of Sherri Davis.

In North America, A Nero Wolfe Mystery is available on Region 1 DVD from A&E Home Video (ISBN 0-7670-8893-X). The A&E DVD release presents "Die Like a Dog" in 4:3 pan and scan rather than its 16:9 aspect ratio for widescreen viewing.
