= Three Witnesses (book) =

1956 novel by Rex Stout

- Author: Rex Stout
- Cover artist: Bill English
- Language: English
- Series: Nero Wolfe
- Genre: Detective fiction
- Publisher: Viking Press
- Publication date: March 10, 1956
- Publication place: United States
- Media type: Print (hardcover)
- Pages: 185 pp. (first edition)
- OCLC: 1449762
- Preceded by: Before Midnight
- Followed by: Might as Well Be Dead

Three Witnesses is a collection of Nero Wolfe mystery novellas by Rex Stout, published by the Viking Press in 1956 and itself collected in the omnibus volume Royal Flush (Viking 1965). The book contains three stories that first appeared in The American Magazine:

- "The Next Witness" (May 1955, as "The Last Witness")
- "When a Man Murders" (May 1954)
- "Die Like a Dog" (December 1954, as "The Body in the Hall")

Each story in this collection features a witness, not to a murder but to its prologue.

== Reviews and commentary ==
- Jacques Barzun and Wendell Hertig Taylor, A Catalogue of Crime — This is unquestionably the best of the Nero Wolfe "threesomes," containing as it does the little masterpiece called "The Next Witness", about a telephone-answering service; "When a Man Murders", a first-rate Enoch Arden tale; "Die Like a Dog", in which a dog and a raincoat mixed up figure prominently and skillfully. Archie is tops in all, and in the first we not only enjoy Wolfe subpoenaed and in a courtroom, but subsequently driving around and doing genuine detection on the hoof.
- Anthony Boucher, The New York Times Book Review (March 18, 1956) — Tantalizingly, the Viking Press informs us that one of the three novelettes in Rex Stout's Three Witnesses "happens to be Stout's favorite among all the novelettes he has written." Which one? Viking isn't telling; but I'll agree that one entry here is at least as good as any I can remember among some two dozen novelettes of Nero Wolfe. "Die Like a Dog" (which, just to be confusing, appeared in American as "The Body in the Hall" and in Ellery Queen's Mystery Magazine as "A Dog in the Daytime") combines one of Stout's most entertaining pictures of life in the menage at 918 West Thirty-fifth, as the hard-headed Nero turns out to be a dog lover at heart, with one of the best pure puzzles I've read in years: a technical model in the fair play and misdirection of the classic adventure form. The other two novelettes here assembled are only slightly less good; and connoisseurs will note with interest the fact that one of them succeeds, incredibly, in keeping Wolfe away from the comforts of Thirty-fifth Street for an entire case.

== Publication history ==
Bill English dust jacket design

- 1956, New York: Viking Press, March 10, 1956, hardcover
  In his limited-edition pamphlet, Collecting Mystery Fiction #10, Rex Stout's Nero Wolfe Part II, Otto Penzler describes the first edition of Three Witnesses: "Pale blue cloth, front cover and spine printed with gold; front and rear covers blank. Issued in a red, black and white dust wrapper."
  In April 2006, Firsts: The Book Collector's Magazine estimated that the first edition of Three Witnesses had a value of between $200 and $350. The estimate is for a copy in very good to fine condition in a like dustjacket.
  The "concept-driven" dustjacket designed by Bill English was cited by graphic design scholar Steven Heller for its spare use of color, sans-serif typography and use of the entire front and back cover area.
- 1956, Toronto: Macmillan, 1956, hardcover
- 1956, New York: Viking Press (Mystery Guild), June 1956, hardcover
  The far less valuable Viking book club edition may be distinguished from the first edition in three ways:
  - The dust jacket has "Book Club Edition" printed on the inside front flap, and the price is absent (first editions may be price clipped if they were given as gifts).
  - Book club editions are sometimes thinner and always taller (usually a quarter of an inch) than first editions.
  - Book club editions are bound in cardboard, and first editions are bound in cloth (or have at least a cloth spine).
- 1956, London: Collins Crime Club, October 22, 1956, hardcover
- 1957, New York: Bantam Books, July 1957, paperback
- 1965, New York: Viking Press, Royal Flush (with Fer-de-Lance and Murder by the Book), July 23, 1965, hardcover
- 1976, London: Hamish Hamilton, 1976
- 1994, New York: Bantam Crimeline ISBN 0-553-24959-2 October 1994, paperback, Rex Stout Library edition with introduction by Susan Conant
- 1997, Newport Beach, California: Books on Tape, Inc. ISBN 0-7366-3751-6 July 21, 1997, audio cassette (unabridged, read by Michael Prichard)
- 2010, New York: Bantam Crimeline ISBN 978-0-307-75625-1 June 9, 2010, e-book
