= When a Man Murders =

- Short story by Rex Stout
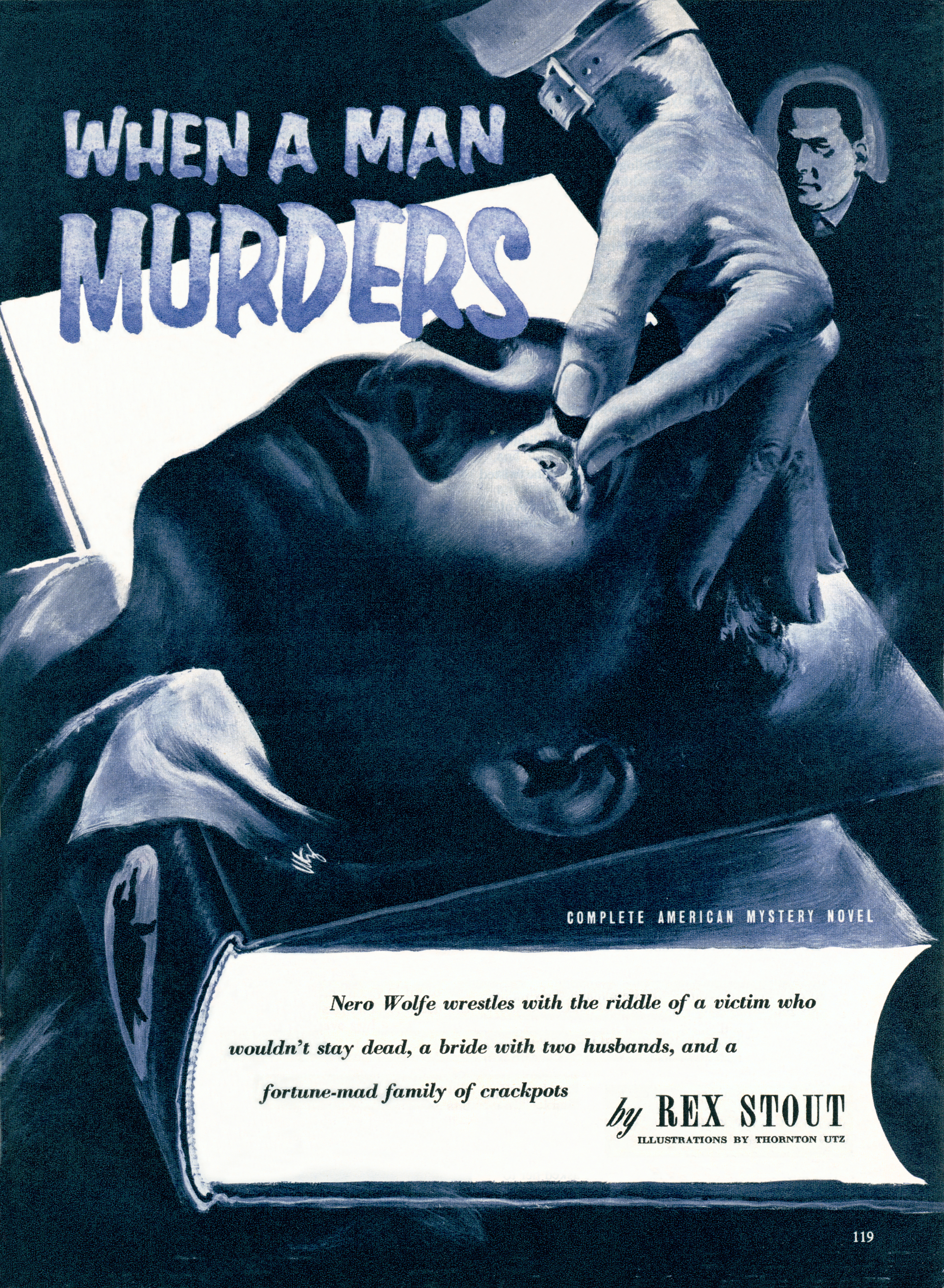
- Illustrated by Thornton Utz
- Country: United States
- Language: English
- Genre: Detective fiction

Publication
- Published in: The American Magazine
- Publication type: Periodical
- Publication date: May 1954
- Series: Nero Wolfe

"When a Man Murders" is a Nero Wolfe mystery novella by Rex Stout, first published in the May 1954 issue of The American Magazine. It first appeared in book form in the short-story collection Three Witnesses, published by the Viking Press in 1956.

== Plot summary ==
There wouldn't have been the slightest excuse for my missing the exact spot for a dead kidney punch, and I didn't. Air exploded out of him, and he crumpled, not sprawling, but in a compact heap. Then he sort of settled to get comfortable.
His attractive wife took a couple of steps toward him, stopped to look at me, and said, "I'll be damned."
"You will if they consult me," I told her emphatically.

— Archie Goodwin, irked by a sucker punch, in Chapter 4 of When a Man Murders

Sidney Karnow has returned from the dead. In 1951 he enlisted in the Army and was sent to Korea as a soldier in the infantry. Injured in battle, he was left for dead by retreating American forces, but in fact was only stunned. Karnow was taken prisoner by the enemy, but after a couple of years he escaped to Manchuria and lived there in a village until the truce. Then he made his way to South Korea and was sent home by the Army.

Unusual enough by itself, but Karnow was also a millionaire. He had inherited money from his parents but felt that he should serve in the military. Before enlisting, he had met and married Caroline, who now calls on Wolfe along with her new husband, Paul Aubry. Caroline and Paul are in a terrible spot: Karnow's return from the dead apparently voids their marriage, and they have spent a large portion of Caroline's inheritance to set Paul up in business as a car dealer. They have decided to offer what is left of the inheritance, plus the dealership, to Karnow in return for his consent to a divorce.

Paul has gone to Karnow's hotel room to put the proposition to him, but got cold feet before knocking on the door. He discusses the situation once again with Caroline, and they decide to come to Wolfe for help. Wolfe explains that he is a detective, not a lawyer, but Aubry replies that "We want you to detect a way of getting Karnow to accept our proposition."

Ignoring Aubry's diction, Wolfe sends Archie, along with Aubry and Caroline, to the Hotel Churchill to put the proposition to Karnow. Archie leaves the clients in the bar and goes upstairs to Karnow's room, gets no answer to his knock, tries the doorknob and finds it unlocked. When he enters, he finds Karnow, shot dead, and a gun lying a few feet away. Archie leaves the room as he found it, collects the clients and returns to the brownstone, where Purley Stebbins soon shows up. Archie, Paul and Caroline were seen at the hotel where Karnow's body was just found.

Stebbins takes Paul and Caroline for questioning (although Wolfe and Archie insist that he do so from the sidewalk: Wolfe will not tolerate a client, even a potential client, being taken into custody inside his house). Archie follows shortly thereafter, and as he is waiting to meet with the DA, he encounters Caroline's in-laws: Karnow's Aunt Margaret, cousins Anne and Richard, and Anne's husband Norman Horne. With them is Jim Beebe, Sidney's lawyer and executor. Archie learns nothing from them except that Anne Horne has a facetious sense of humor.

Archie has no information for ADA Mandelbaum and Inspector Cramer, and shortly after he returns home Caroline rings the doorbell. She brings the news that the police have arrested Paul for Karnow's murder, and she wants to hire Wolfe to clear him. Wolfe accepts, but needs to knows more about Karnow's relatives. They had received bequests in Karnow's will, stood to lose those bequests when he turned up alive, and therefore had motive. Caroline knows little about them except that they had always depended on Karnow's support, and have not managed their inheritances prudently. Wolfe sends Archie to bring them to the office.

Archie tries Beebe first but can't corral him, and has no better luck with Karnow's Aunt Margaret and his cousin Richard. When he calls on cousin Anne, he gets more of her persiflage. Trying to draw her out, he lets her read his palm – and then her husband Norman returns to their apartment. Anne slows Archie down just enough that Norman, unencumbered, can clip Archie in the jaw. Then Archie decks Norman, and leaves.

Finally Wolfe hears from Saul Panzer, who has been investigating a different side of the problem. Wolfe has Archie phone Inspector Cramer, and gives him the choice of bringing all involved to Wolfe's office, or declining to cooperate and letting Wolfe work through the DA's office. Cramer chooses the former option. In the traditional meeting with the suspects in Wolfe's office, Wolfe makes public what Saul has turned up: an unwitting but crucial witness to the motive for Karnow's murder.

== Cast of characters ==
- Nero Wolfe — The private investigator
- Archie Goodwin — Wolfe's assistant, and the narrator of all Wolfe stories
- Sidney Karnow — Wealthy, picturesque heir, thought killed in the Korean War
- Caroline Karnow — His widow, newly remarried
- Paul Aubry — Caroline's new husband
- Margaret Savage — Karnow's aunt
- Richard Savage and Anne Savage Horne — Karnow's cousins
- Norman Horne — Anne's husband
- Jim Beebe — Karnow's lawyer and executor
- Inspector Cramer and Sergeant Purley Stebbins — Representing Manhattan Homicide

== Publication history ==
=== "When a Man Murders" ===
- 1954, The American Magazine, May 1954
- 1955, Ellery Queen's Mystery Magazine, May 1955
- 1964, Ellery Queen's Anthology, Mid-year 1964

=== Three Witnesses ===
- 1956, New York: Viking Press, March 10, 1956, hardcover

Contents include "The Next Witness", "When a Man Murders" and "Die Like a Dog".
In his limited-edition pamphlet, Collecting Mystery Fiction #10, Rex Stout's Nero Wolfe Part II, Otto Penzler describes the first edition of Three Witnesses: "Pale blue cloth, front cover and spine printed with gold; front and rear covers blank. Issued in a red, black and white dust wrapper."
In April 2006, Firsts: The Book Collector's Magazine estimated that the first edition of Three Witnesses had a value of between $200 and $350. The estimate is for a copy in very good to fine condition in a like dustjacket.

- 1956, Toronto: Macmillan, 1956, hardcover
- 1956, New York: Viking Press (Mystery Guild), June 1956, hardcover

The far less valuable Viking book club edition may be distinguished from the first edition in three ways:

- The dust jacket has "Book Club Edition" printed on the inside front flap, and the price is absent (first editions may be price clipped if they were given as gifts).
- Book club editions are sometimes thinner and always taller (usually a quarter of an inch) than first editions.
- Book club editions are bound in cardboard, and first editions are bound in cloth (or have at least a cloth spine).

- 1956, London: Collins Crime Club, October 22, 1956, hardcover
- 1957, New York: Bantam Books, July 1957, paperback
- 1965, New York: Viking Press, Royal Flush (with Fer-de-Lance and Murder by the Book), July 23, 1965, hardcover
- 1976, London: Hamish Hamilton, 1976
- 1994, New York: Bantam Crimeline ISBN 0-553-24959-2 October 1994, paperback, Rex Stout Library edition with introduction by Susan Conant
- 1997, Newport Beach, California: Books on Tape, Inc. ISBN 0-7366-3751-6 July 21, 1997, audio cassette (unabridged, read by Michael Prichard)
- 2010, New York: Bantam Crimeline ISBN 978-0-307-75625-1 June 9, 2010, e-book
