= The Next Witness =

- Short story by Rex Stout
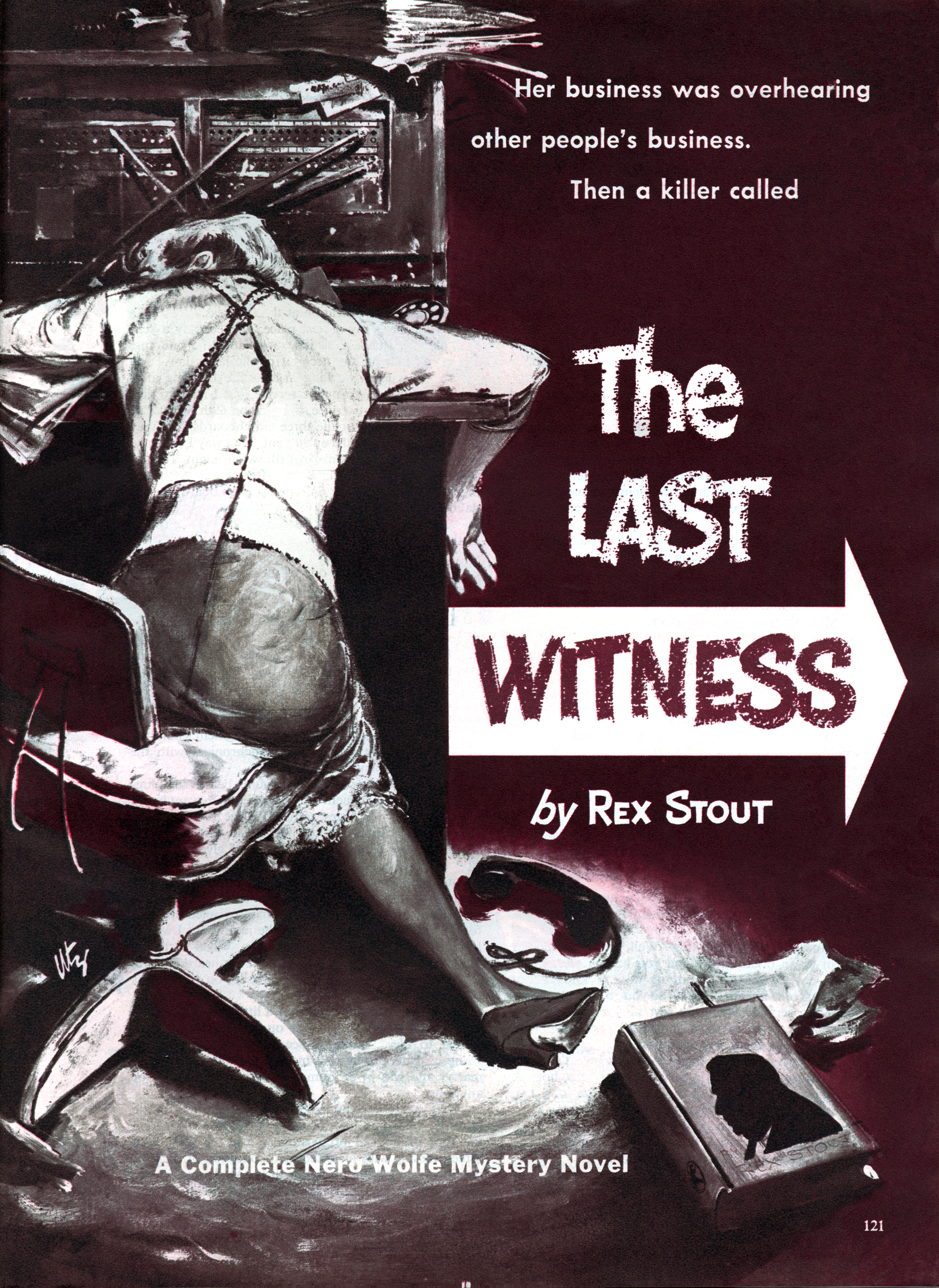
- Illustrated by Thornton Utz
- Original title: The Last Witness
- Country: United States
- Language: English
- Genre: Detective fiction

Publication
- Published in: The American Magazine
- Publication type: Periodical
- Publication date: May 1955
- Series: Nero Wolfe

"The Next Witness" is a Nero Wolfe mystery novella by Rex Stout, first published as "The Last Witness" in the May 1955 issue of The American Magazine. It first appeared in book form in the short-story collection Three Witnesses, published by the Viking Press in 1956.

== Plot summary ==
Nero Wolfe and Archie Goodwin are in court, having been subpoenaed to testify for the prosecution in a murder trial. Leonard Ashe has been accused of trying to hire Bagby Answers, Inc., a telephone answering service, to eavesdrop on his wife's calls, and of killing employee Marie Willis when she refused to cooperate. The prosecutor intends to call Wolfe and Archie to testify that Wolfe turned down Ashe's attempt to hire them to spy on his wife, actress Robina Keane.

Clyde Bagby, owner of the business, testifies that Marie had complained to him about Ashe's request and was planning to tell Robina. Bagby tried unsuccessfully to dissuade Marie; later that same night, he learned from the police that she had been strangled to death at her switchboard. Wolfe abruptly exits the courtroom, followed by Archie, who reminds him that they are under subpoena and will almost certainly be charged with contempt of court for leaving. Wolfe, however, is convinced of Ashe's innocence and wants to have no part in convicting him.

They visit the premises of Bagby Answers, finding the business to be located in an apartment with a bedroom for each operator due to employment regulations. Wolfe makes himself as obnoxious as possible in order to see how much incivility the employees will tolerate, and the detectives take notice of an original Van Gogh painting on a wall and a stack of racing forms on a table while questioning operators Bella Velardi and Alice Hart. From them, Wolfe and Archie learn that Helen Weltz, another operator, is spending the afternoon at a cottage in Westchester that she has rented for the summer.

Arriving at the cottage, they find a new Jaguar parked in front. Helen is accompanied by Guy Unger, an acquaintance of several of Bagby's employees. Unger describes himself as a broker, but gives only a vague description of the business he transacts. Helen privately admits to Archie that she wants to get out of an uncomfortable situation, but is too frightened of Unger to give details. Archie persuades her to call Wolfe's office that evening, then learns from Wolfe that Unger tried to pay him to drop the investigation into Marie's murder.

Wolfe and Archie return to the city, but cannot go to the brownstone because a warrant has been issued for their arrest. They take shelter at Saul Panzer's apartment for the night, and Wolfe meets with Robina to persuade her to visit Ashe and take him with her. She agrees, promising not to tell Ashe's attorney. Archie gets a call from Helen, relayed to him by Fritz Brenner, and picks her up from Grand Central Station in order to interview her out of Unger's presence. Wolfe and Robina meet with Ashe shortly before the trial resumes the following morning.

Once called to the witness stand, Wolfe tricks the prosecutor into asking a question that both allows him to explain his theory of the crime and forces the judge to dismiss the contempt charge. Based on the operators' behavior during his visit and the evidence of their lavish spending, he concluded that Bagby and Unger were using the answering service to blackmail clients by having the employees listen in on calls and gather compromising information. Helen had confirmed these facts to Archie the previous night. However, the plan would only succeed if every operator took part; anyone who showed hesitation could potentially expose the scheme. When Marie acted against Bagby's orders and turned down Ashe's request to spy on his wife, one of her co-workers strangled her to keep her quiet. Wolfe suspected Bagby of committing the murder and luring Ashe to the office so that he would be found with the body and arrested.

Bagby, Unger, Helen, Bella, and Alice are detained for questioning, Ashe is acquitted, and Bagby is ultimately convicted of Marie's murder without the need of any further testimony from Wolfe. Archie reflects that Wolfe's exit from the courtroom may have been motivated less by a desire to see justice done than by the discomfort of having to sit next to a woman wearing too much perfume.

== Cast of characters ==
- Nero Wolfe — The private investigator
- Archie Goodwin — Wolfe's assistant, and the narrator of all Wolfe stories
- Clyde Bagby — Owner of a telephone answering service
- Leonard Ashe — A Bagby client
- Robina Keane — Ashe's wife, a retired stage actress
- Marie Willis — A Bagby employee, found strangled with her phone cord
- Helen Weltz, Alice Hart and Bella Velardi — Other Bagby employees
- Guy Unger — Mysterious friend of Marie Willis and Helen Weltz
- Jimmy Donovan — Leonard Ashe's defense lawyer
- Assistant District Attorney Irving Mandelbaum — Representing the people of the City of New York

== The unfamiliar word ==
"Readers of the Wolfe saga often have to turn to the dictionary because of the erudite vocabulary of Wolfe and sometimes of Archie," wrote Rev. Frederick G. Gotwald.

Examples of unfamiliar words — or unfamiliar uses of words that some would otherwise consider familiar — are found throughout the corpus, often in the give-and-take between Wolfe and Archie.

- Daddled. Chapter 2. The Shorter Oxford English Dictionary regards this word as from the first element of dadder, long obsolete except in dialect and meaning to quake or tremble.
- Justicial. Chapter 1.

== Publication history ==
=== "The Next Witness" ===
- 1955, The American Magazine, May 1955 (as "The Last Witness")
- 1980, Ellery Queen's Mystery Magazine, February 1980
- 2012, The Green Bag Almanac & Reader

=== Three Witnesses ===
- 1956, New York: Viking Press, March 10, 1956, hardcover

Contents include "The Next Witness", "When a Man Murders" and "Die Like a Dog".
In his limited-edition pamphlet, Collecting Mystery Fiction #10, Rex Stout's Nero Wolfe Part II, Otto Penzler describes the first edition of Three Witnesses: "Pale blue cloth, front cover and spine printed with gold; front and rear covers blank. Issued in a red, black and white dust wrapper."
In April 2006, Firsts: The Book Collector's Magazine estimated that the first edition of Three Witnesses had a value of between $200 and $350. The estimate is for a copy in very good to fine condition in a like dustjacket.

- 1956, Toronto: Macmillan, 1956, hardcover
- 1956, New York: Viking Press (Mystery Guild), June 1956, hardcover

The far less valuable Viking book club edition may be distinguished from the first edition in three ways:

- The dust jacket has "Book Club Edition" printed on the inside front flap, and the price is absent (first editions may be price clipped if they were given as gifts).
- Book club editions are sometimes thinner and always taller (usually a quarter of an inch) than first editions.
- Book club editions are bound in cardboard, and first editions are bound in cloth (or have at least a cloth spine).

- 1956, London: Collins Crime Club, October 22, 1956, hardcover
- 1957, New York: Bantam Books, July 1957, paperback
- 1965, New York: Viking Press, Royal Flush (with Fer-de-Lance and Murder by the Book), July 23, 1965, hardcover
- 1976, London: Hamish Hamilton, 1976
- 1994, New York: Bantam Crimeline ISBN 0-553-24959-2 October 1994, paperback, Rex Stout Library edition with introduction by Susan Conant
- 1997, Newport Beach, California: Books on Tape, Inc. ISBN 0-7366-3751-6 July 21, 1997, audio cassette (unabridged, read by Michael Prichard)
- 2010, New York: Bantam Crimeline ISBN 978-0-307-75625-1 June 9, 2010, e-book

== Adaptations ==
=== Nero Wolfe (A&E Network) ===
"Will you have some beer?" Saul Panzer (Conrad Dunn) is host to Nero Wolfe (Maury Chaykin) in A&E's 16:9 letterboxed version of "The Next Witness"

"The Next Witness" was adapted for the second season of the A&E TV series A Nero Wolfe Mystery (2001–2002). Written by Sharon Elizabeth Doyle and directed by James Tolkan, the episode made its debut April 21, 2002, on A&E.

Timothy Hutton is Archie Goodwin; Maury Chaykin is Nero Wolfe. Other members of the cast of "The Next Witness," in credits order, include Bill Smitrovich (Inspector Cramer), Conrad Dunn (Saul Panzer), Christine Brubaker (Bella Velardi), R. D. Reid (Sergeant Purley Stebbins), Saul Rubinek (Lon Cohen), Robert Bockstael (Jimmy Donovan), Nicky Guadagni (Alice Hart), Richard Waugh (Guy Unger), David Schurmann (Leonard Ashe), Boyd Banks (Clyde Bagby), Wayne Best (District Attorney Mandelbaum), Francie Swift (Helen Weltz), Beau Starr (Judge Corbett), Rebecca Jenkins (Robina Keane), Kathryn Zenna (Pearl Fleming), Hrant Alianak (Coroner)

In addition to original music by Nero Wolfe composer Michael Small, the soundtrack includes music by Henry Davies (titles) (Note: Henry Davies, "All Day Long I Dream (of Caroline)". Carlin Production Music, CAR 148, The History of Jazz (track 11).) and Johannes Brahms (opening sequence). (Note: Johannes Brahms, Hungarian Dance No. 5; KPM Music Ltd. KPM CS 7, Light Classics Volume One (track 11).)

Broadcast in widescreen when shown outside North America, "The Next Witness" is also expanded from 45 minutes to 90 minutes for international broadcast. Solo interviews with Leonard Ashe, Jimmy Donovan, Robina Keane and the coroner punctuate the 90-minute episode. Other scenes are expanded; Wolfe and Archie's visit to Saul Panzer's apartment runs five minutes longer in the international version.

In North America, A Nero Wolfe Mystery was released on Region 1 DVD by A&E Home Video (ISBN 0-7670-8893-X). The A&E DVD release presents the 45-minute version of "The Next Witness" in 4:3 pan and scan rather than its 16:9 aspect ratio for widescreen viewing. (Note: VHS recording created for NW Production Services, Inc., labelled as follows: NERO WOLFE: EPS:202B "THE NEXT WITNESS" A&E 16 X 9 LETTERBOX VERSION DUR: 47:42:13 5 JUNE 02)

=== Nero Wolfe (CBC Radio) ===
"The Next Witness" was adapted as the 11th episode of the Canadian Broadcasting Corporation's 13-part radio series Nero Wolfe (1982), starring Mavor Moore as Nero Wolfe, Don Francks as Archie Goodwin, and Cec Linder as Inspector Cramer. Written and directed by Toronto actor and producer Ron Hartmann, the hour-long adaptation aired on CBC Stereo March 27, 1982.
