= Top Gun: Fire at Will =

1996 video game

- Developers: Spectrum HoloByte (MS-DOS); MicroProse (PlayStation)
- Publisher: Spectrum HoloByte
- Series: Top Gun
- Platforms: MS-DOS, Windows, PlayStation, Mac OS
- Release: MS-DOS: NA: February 21, 1996; EU: 1996; PlayStation: NA: June 12, 1996; EU: July 15, 1996; Mac: NA: 1998
- Genre: Combat flight simulation
- Mode: Single-player

Top Gun: Fire at Will is a video game that was developed and published by Spectrum HoloByte for MS-DOS, Windows, PlayStation, and Mac OS. It is a licensed game in the Top Gun franchise. A sequel, Top Gun: Hornet's Nest, was released in 1998.

== Gameplay ==
The plot of Fire at Will is focused on Maverick as the player-character, flying combat missions in Cuba, North Korea, and Libya to stop a group of mercenary pilots known as the "Cadre".

The PlayStation version of the game emphasizes action over simulation in contrast to the computer versions; take-offs and landings were removed, and the player starts each mission with enemies nearby, rather than seeking them out.

== Release ==
Top Gun: Fire At Will was published by Spectrum HoloByte and released in 1996 for MS-DOS, Windows, and PlayStation. Classic Mac OS port was released in 1998. It is the only Top Gun title to include any actors who appeared in the film, as James Tolkan played a commanding officer (his character is known as "Stinger" in the film, but his character is called "Hondo" in the game).

== Reception ==
Reception

Review scores
Publication	Score
Computer Gaming World	4/5 (PC)
Electronic Gaming Monthly	5.75/10 (PS1)
GameSpot	3.8/10
IGN	3/10 (PC)
Next Generation	2/5 (PC, PS1)
PC PowerPlay	6/10

The MS-DOS version received average reviews. A Next Generation critic called Top Gun: Fire at Will a flight sim without being simulation, having no video clips and lame plot. While he complimented the variety of missions, the networked multiplayer, and aspects of the graphics, he held to his overall negative assessment of the game. Robin G. Kim of Computer Gaming World praised the game for "action-filled missions with great atmosphere and an intriguing storyline", but conceded the game suffered from "blotchy terrain graphics", poor sound design and technical issues.

A reviewer for PC PowerPlay admitted "Top Gun is not a flight sim, nor does it claim to be", but that the simplicity of the gameplay will appeal to the person who wants to play a jet style shoot-em-up with a bit of a story line to keep them interested.

The PlayStation version also received middling reviews. Critics noted that the game is more of an action-heavy, arcade-style shoot 'em up than a realistic flight simulator, but were divided over whether this unexpected choice of gameplay style was reasonably successful. Some praised the mixture of arcade-style and simulation style gameplay, while others criticized the lack of takeoff and landing sequences and the way the controls differ from most flight sims. However, critics generally agreed that the graphics are very good, and that the enemy pilots are boringly easy to defeat.

The game sold more than 375,000 copies.
