= James Tolkan =

American actor (1931–2026)

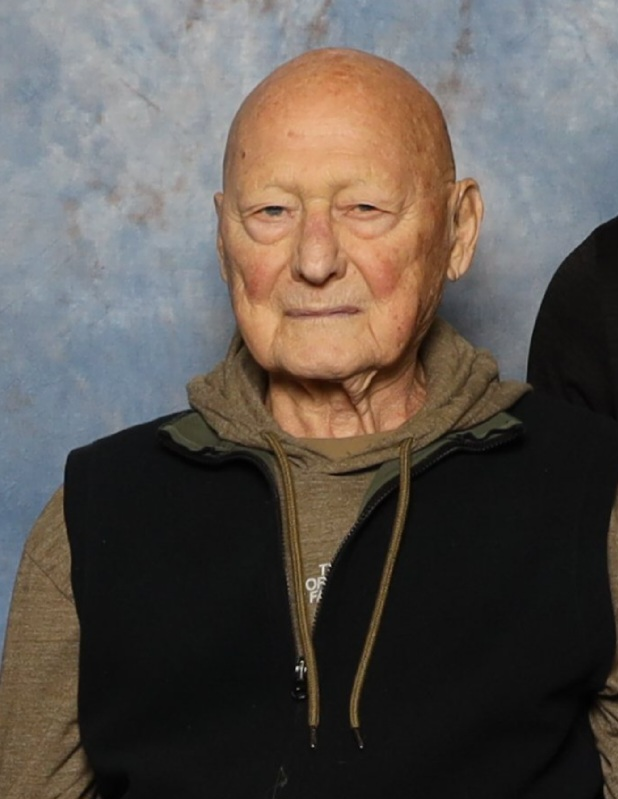
- Tolkan in 2025
- Born: James Stewart Tolkan; June 20, 1931; Calumet, Michigan, U.S.
- Died: March 26, 2026 (aged 94); Saranac Lake, New York, U.S.
- Education: University of Iowa (BA)
- Occupation: Actor
- Years active: 1960–2015; 2021; 2024
- Notable work: Love and Death (1975); Prince of the City (1981); Back to the Future (1985–1990); Top Gun (1986); Dick Tracy (1990)
- Spouse: Parmelee Welles (m. 1971)

James Stewart Tolkan (June 20, 1931 – March 26, 2026) was an American character actor. He was best known for portraying the strict high-school vice principal Mr. Strickland in Back to the Future (1985) and Back to the Future Part II (1989), and the character's ancestor, Marshal James Strickland, in Back to the Future Part III (1990). His other notable film credits included Serpico (1973), Love and Death (1975), Prince of the City (1981), Top Gun (1986), Masters of the Universe (1987), Viper (1988), Dick Tracy (1990), and Problem Child 2 (1991).

== Early life ==
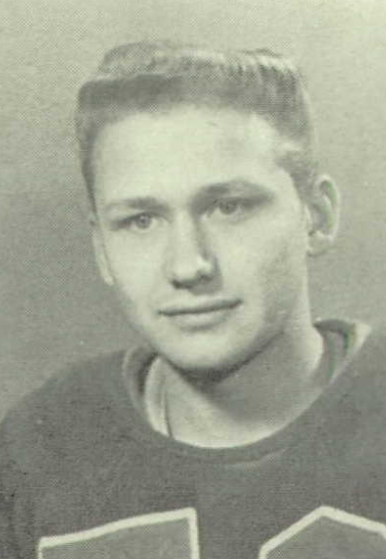
Tolkan as a high-school senior in 1949

James Stewart Tolkan was born on June 20, 1931, in Calumet, Michigan, to Marjorie Effie Nichols (1912–1993) and Ralph Milton Tolkan (1908–1967), a cattle dealer. He graduated from Amphitheater High School in Tucson, Arizona, in 1949, where he played on the football team. Tolkan attended Eastern Arizona College on a football scholarship before leaving to join the United States Navy during the Korean War, serving aboard the USS Sandoval. He was discharged within a year due to a heart condition, and in 1956 he earned a Bachelor of Arts degree in drama from the University of Iowa.

== Career ==
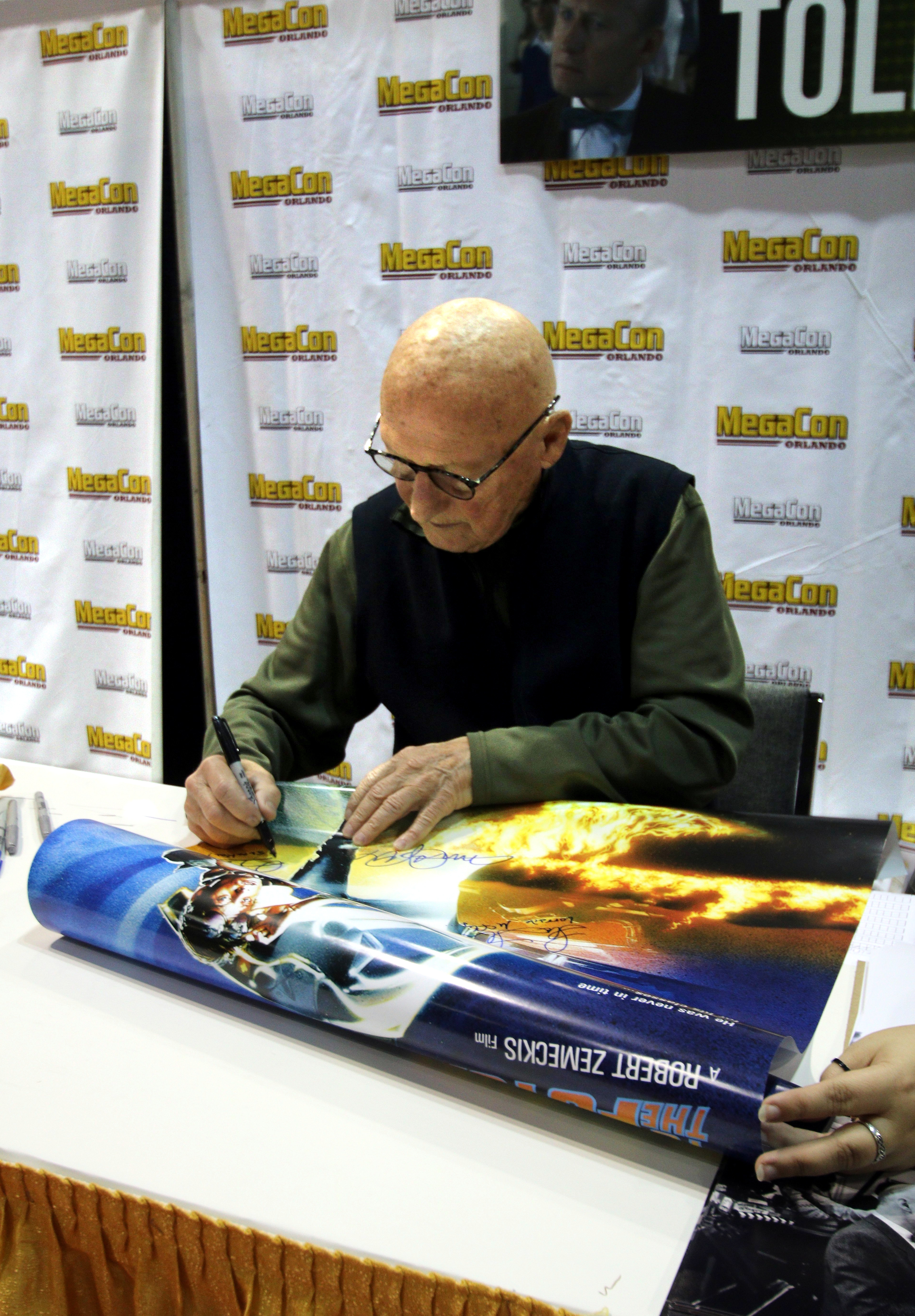
Tolkan autographing a Back to the Future poster in 2019

Tolkan made his film debut in The Three Sisters, an independently produced 1966 Actors Studio adaptation of Anton Chekov's play Three Sisters. The film featured an ensemble cast that included Geraldine Page, Sandy Dennis, Kim Stanley, Shelley Winters, Kevin McCarthy, Robert Loggia, and James Olson.

He was widely known for portraying the strict Hill Valley High School vice principal Gerald Strickland in Back to the Future (1985), in which the character derisively refers to Marty McFly, George McFly, and Biff Tannen as "slackers". Tolkan reprised the role in Back to the Future Part II (1989) appearing in a dystopian 1985 sequence in which unnamed gang members attack him; he again uses the term "slackers" as he returns fire. In Back to the Future Part III (1990), he played Chief Marshal James Strickland, the character's grandfather. He later voiced an unnamed Civil Defense Warden in a 1992 episode of the animated spin-off series.

Tolkan's other notable film roles included an FBI agent in WarGames (1983), Stinger, the commanding officer of USS Enterprise's Carrier Air Wing, in Top Gun (1986), Big Boy Caprice's accountant, Numbers, in Dick Tracy (1990), and Mr. Thorn in Problem Child 2 (1991). He appeared in Serpico (1973) as a policeman who falsely accuses the title character of a homosexual encounter in a men's room. In Woody Allen's Love and Death (1975), he played both Napoleon Bonaparte and a look-alike. He played the Coroner in The Amityville Horror (1979). He portrayed New York City District Attorney George Polito (based on real-life D.A. Thomas Puccio) in Sidney Lumet's Prince of the City (1981), the union treasurer Lou Brackman in the screwball comedy Armed and Dangerous (1986), and Detective Lubic in Masters of the Universe (1987). He also had a rare leading role as Colonel William Tansey in the action thriller Viper (1988).

On television, Tolkan made guest appearances on numerous series, including Naked City, The Hat Squad, Hill Street Blues, Remington Steele, Miami Vice, The Fresh Prince of Bel-Air, The Wonder Years, Early Edition, and The Pretender. As a member of the repertory cast of Nero Wolfe (2001–02), he played more than a dozen roles and directed two episodes.

== Personal life and death ==
Tolkan met his wife, Parmelee, while working on the 1971 off‑Broadway play Pinkville, where she was employed as a prop girl, and they married later that year.

Tolkan died on March 26, 2026, at his home in Saranac Lake, New York, at the age of 94.

== Filmography ==
=== Film ===
James Tolkan film credits
Year	Title	Role	Notes	Ref.
1966	The Three Sisters	Officer / Carnival Character		
1969	Stiletto	Edwards		
1971	They Might Be Giants	Mr. Brown		
1973	The Friends of Eddie Coyle	The Man's Contact Man		
1973	The Werewolf of Washington	Dark Glasses		
1973	Serpico	Lieutenant Steiger	Credited as James Tolkin	
1975	Love and Death	Napoleon Bonaparte		
1975	Abduction	Off-Duty Cop		
1976	Independence	Thomas Paine	Credited as James Tolkin	
1979	The Amityville Horror	The Coroner		
1981	Wolfen	"Baldy", Medical Examiner		
1981	Prince of the City	District Attorney Polito		
1982	Hanky Panky	Conferee		
1982	Author! Author!	Lieutenant Glass		
1983	WarGames	FBI Agent George Wigan		
1983	Nightmares	The Bishop	Voice; segment: "The Bishop of Battle"	
1984	Iceman	Maynard		
1984	The River	Howard Simpson		
1985	Turk 182!	Hanley		
1985	Back to the Future	Principal Gerald Strickland		
1985	Walls of Glass	Turner		
1986	Off Beat	Harry		
1986	Top Gun	Commander Tom "Stinger" Jardian		
1986	Armed and Dangerous	Lou Brackman		
1987	Masters of the Universe	Detective Hugh Lubic		
1987	Made in Heaven	Mr. Bjornstead		
1988	Viper	Colonel William Tansey		
1988	Split Decisions	Benny Pistone		
1989	True Blood	Detective Joe Hanley		
1989	Second Sight	Captain Coolidge		
1989	Back to the Future Part II	Principal Gerald Strickland		
1989	Ministry of Vengeance	Colonel Freeman		
1989	Family Business	Judge in 2nd Trial		
1990	Opportunity Knocks	Sal Nichols		
1990	Back to the Future Part III	U.S. Deputy Marshal James Strickland		
1990	Dick Tracy	"Numbers"		
1991	Hangfire	"Patch"		
1991	Trabbi Goes to Hollywood	Vince		
1991	Problem Child 2	Mr. Thorn		
1992	Bloodfist IV: Die Trying	Agent Sterling	Direct-to-video	
1993	Boiling Point	Senior US Treasury Agent Jerry Levitt		
1996	Underworld	Dan "Iceberg" Eagan		
1996	Robo Warriors	Quon	Direct-to-video	
1999	Wings: Thrill of Flight	Host		
2004	Seven Times Lucky	"Dutch"		
2006	Heavens Fall	Thomas Knight Sr.		
2015	Bone Tomahawk	The Pianist		
2024	Tom Wilson: Humbly Super Famous	Himself	Documentary	
2025	BTTF Project 85: The Back to the Future Fan Remake	Principal Gerald Strickland	Uncredited	

=== Television ===
James Tolkan television credits
Year	Title	Role	Notes	Ref.
1960	Naked City	Evan Humboldt	Episode: "The Man Who Bit a Diamond in Half"	
1962	Armstrong Circle Theatre	Stefan Malwitz	Episode: "The Man Who Refused to Die"	
1969	N.Y.P.D.	McCloud	Episode: "The Night Watch"	
1983	American Playhouse	Billy	Episode: "Wings"	
1985	Hill Street Blues	Coach Beasley	Episode: "Queen for a Day"	
1985–1986	Mary	Lester Mintz	13 episodes	
1985–1987	Remington Steele	Norman Keyes	5 episodes "Diced Steele" "Forged Steele" "Bonds of Steele" "The Steele That Wouldn't Die" (2 parts)	
1986	Little Spies	The Kennel Master	Television film	
1987	Miami Vice	Mason Mather	Episode: "Amen ... Send Money"	
1988	Weekend War	Dr. Alex Thompson	Television film	
1988	Leap of Faith	Dr. Siegel	Television film	
1989	The Equalizer	Ruger	Episode: "The Visitation"	
1989	The Case of the Hillside Stranglers	Lt. Ed Henderson	Television film	
1990	Sunset Beat	Ray Parker	Episode: "One Down, Four Up"	
1990	The Fresh Prince of Bel-Air	Dr. Oates / Dr. Bloat	Episode: "Day Damn One"	
1991	Tales from the Crypt	Sergeant McClaine	Episode: "The Trap"	
1992	Tequila and Bonetti	Unknown	Episode: "Fetch This, Pal"	
1992	Sketch Artist	Lieutenant Tonelli	Television film	
1992	The Hat Squad	Mike Ragland	Episode: "The Widow Marker"	
1992	Back to the Future	Civil Defense Warden	Voice; episode: "Marty McFly PFC"	
1993	The Wonder Years	Coach Silva	Episode: "Hulk Arnold"	
1993–1994	Cobra	Dallas Cassel	22 episodes	
1994	Beyond Betrayal	Joe Maloney	Television film	
1995	Sketch Artist II: Hands That See	Lieutenant Tonelli	Television film	
1996	Nowhere Man	Commander Cyrus Quinn	Episode: "Heart of Darkness"	
1996	Early Edition	Coach Phillips	Episode: "Hoops"	
1997	Love in Ambush	Agent Price	Television film	
1997	The Pretender	FBI Special Agent Korkos	Episode: "Dragon House"	
2001–2002	Nero Wolfe	14 roles Richard Wragg; Mr. Hackett; Bernard Quest; W.J. Mr. Joseph Pitcairn; Percy Ludlow; Avery Ballou; Loftus, Dog Expert; Leo Bingham; Adrian Dart; Benedict Aiken; Ben Jenson; Richard Wragg; Ed Graboff	14 episodes "The Doorbell Rang" "Champagne for One" "Prisoner's Base" "Disguise for Murder" "Door to Death" "Over My Dead Body" "Death of a Doxy" "Die Like a Dog" "Motherhunt" "Poison à la Carte" "Too Many Clients" "Help Wanted, Male" "The Silent Speaker" "Cop Killer" Also director in 2 episodes ("Die Like a Dog" & "The Next Witness"	
2011	Leverage	Dean Chesny	Episode: "The Cross My Heart Job"	
2013	Phil Spector	Judge Larry Fidler	Television film	
2021	Expedition: Back to the Future	Strickland / Guard	1 episode	

=== Video games ===
- 1996: Top Gun: Fire at Will – Commander Hondo
- 1998: Top Gun: Hornet's Nest – Commander Hondo
