= Top Gun: Hornet's Nest =

1998 video game

- Developer: Zipper Interactive
- Publisher: MicroProse
- Series: Top Gun
- Platform: Windows
- Release: NA: December 4, 1998; PAL: 1998
- Genre: Combat flight simulation
- Modes: Single-player, multiplayer

Top Gun: Hornet's Nest is a 1998 combat flight simulation game developed by Zipper Interactive and published by MicroProse for Microsoft Windows. It is loosely based on the 1986 film Top Gun, and is a sequel to the 1996 game Top Gun: Fire at Will. The game was criticized for its lack of realism and its flight physics.

== Gameplay ==
Top Gun: Hornet's Nest is a combat flight simulation game. Playing as "Maverick" from the film Top Gun, the player takes control of an F/A-18 Hornet combat jet. The game features three campaign modes, each with 10 missions. Each campaign mode and their missions must be played in order before proceeding. The first mode takes place in Siberia, where the player must stop Russian general Martikov, who has seized nuclear weapons. After stopping Martikov, the second campaign takes place in Iraq, which had purchased nuclear weapons from Martikov. In the final campaign, terrorists have attacked the Panama Canal, requiring the player to travel to Colombia to prevent any further destruction. The player has a wingman throughout the missions.

The player's weapons include missiles and several fictional armaments, such as an aerial cluster bomb capable of destroying a group of close-flying targets. The game offers several perspectives, including a cockpit view with the instrument panel visible, and an external view set from behind the plane. During missions, the player can land the plane to rearm and refuel. Some missions have puzzle-solving elements. In one mission, the player must slowly sneak through an underground maze while piloting the plane, peeking around corners before proceeding.

The game includes the Instant Action mode, in which the player can play a customized round of air combat without a storyline. Instant Action has the player destroy enemy planes and installations for as long as possible before dying. In Instant Action, the player can select any of the three locations, and the number and type of enemies. In addition, the game includes modem and network multiplayer, and also offered online multiplayer through MSN Gaming Zone.

== Development and release ==
Top Gun: Hornet's Nest was developed by American company Zipper Interactive and published by MicroProse as a sequel to Top Gun: Fire at Will (1996). The game was announced in April 1998, and was developed with a new graphics engine over its predecessor. MicroProse intended the game to have an emphasis on action rather than simulation. Jim Bosler of Zipper Interactive said the goal was to provide "intense action and realism, while offering a user-friendly design". James Tolkan reprised his role as Commander Hondo from the previous game. In the United States, Top Gun: Hornet's Nest was released for Microsoft Windows in early December 1998.

== Reception ==
Reception

Aggregate score
Aggregator	Score
GameRankings	49%

Review scores
Publication	Score
AllGame	3.5/5
CNET Gamecenter	4/10
Computer Games Strategy Plus	1.5/5
Computer Gaming World	2/5
GameSpot	3.8/10
IGN	5.1/10
PC Gamer (UK)	32%
PC Gamer (US)	25%
PC PowerPlay	65%
PC Zone	65%

The game received unfavorable reviews according to the review aggregation website GameRankings.

GameSpot's Denny Atkin was negative to the game, calling the game as frustrated and not fun, also criticising the difficulty for beginners and veterans of flight sim genre. Jeff Lackey of Computer Gaming World believed the game would be too arcade-like for simulation fans, and too difficult for casual gamers. He believed it would appeal to action gamers who enjoyed nonstop combat and puzzle elements. Dean Evans of the United Kingdom's PC Gamer described it as a "limited, bare-bones" game. Jeremy Wells of PC Zone considered the game too simple and too short, and recommended other better flight sim titles to play. Andy Mahood of CNET Gamecenter considered the game an uninspired "rehash of an aging movie concept". He also found the game short, and lacking replay value because of it. Marc Dultz of GamePro stated that the game would not appeal to casual flight simulation gamers. (Note: GamePro gave the game 4/5 for graphics, 4.5/5 for sound, and two 3/5 scores for control and fun factor.) Nick Smith of AllGame was more positive of the game despite acknowledging its flaws.

T. Liam McDonald of the U.S. PC Gamer was critical of the previous game, and found Hornet's Nest to be worse, stating that the latter game was only superior with regard to its terrain engine. Tom Chick of Computer Games Strategy Plus considered the terrain adequate but otherwise was critical of the graphics. Mahood said that the terrain and aircraft visuals, although reasonably sharp, are also bland and colorless. Atkin praised the sound and graphics, but the terrain was deemed as polygonal. Dultz criticized the basic graphics and wrote that with the lack of high-definition detail, it was often difficult to tell where the sky and ground met. Evans considered the Hornet aircraft "neatly textured and detailed" but was critical of the outdated landscaping. Dultz opined that the Hornet plane barely resembled its real-life counterpart.

The player's wingman was criticized for poor artificial intelligence. Dultz stated that the wingman may sometimes unwittingly crash into a mountain or the desert floor, even though his gas tanks have been topped off and he was never once fired upon. The difficulty was also criticized. Dultz noted that player and enemy missiles almost always destroy their target, making the game both easy and difficult. Atkin complained of frustrating air-to-ground missiles, which only lock onto vehicles but not buildings.

Lackey considered the missions to be the best and worst aspects of the game, describing them as both "cleverly crafted" and "frustratingly difficult". Atkin wrote about the missions: "They're certainly anything but typical - what other sim lets you navigate your F/A-18 through a maze, Quake-style?" Lackey described the maze level as "the most bizarre mission I've ever seen in a combat flight game". Atkin noted that the game's campaign missions have far more in common with the James Bond films than with the Tom Cruise film. He concluded that there was little to recommend the game, other than "some original (if wacky) mission scenarios". McDonald criticized the "silly" storyline and "sci-fi super-weapons", while describing the latter as feeling as untested. He wrote that the game could have had "some glimmer" of potential with better flight programming and missions that were "actually tested".

Evans felt that the Instant Action and multiplayer modes played better than the main campaign modes, which were criticized by some reviewers for their linear gameplay. Steve Butts of IGN criticized the inability to customize the weather, cloud coverage, and time of day in Instant Action. Some critics noted that no one was playing the game on MSN Gaming Zone at the time of their reviews.

Criticism went to the game's lack of realism and its flight physics, including the slow plane maneuvers. McDonald wrote that the Hornet "handles like a pig stuck in the mud", while Lackey stated that it "is nowhere near as responsive as a real plane". Mahood stated that the plane's flight model and avionics are badly constructed. Dultz opined that the flight model and avionics have been watered down to the point where the game feels more like an arcade shooter than a sim-lite.

Chick criticized the "simplified" action for being "generic and dull". Mahood stated that the "cartoon simplicity" would not appeal to hardcore flight simulation gamers, although he considered the game easy to learn. Smith wrote that the flight simulation fans would be dismayed with the game being easy and having simplistic controls. Butts praised the simplicity of the game, stating that it "strikes a nice balance between realism and playability".

Reviewers stated that the game had only a minimal relation to the film. Atkin believed that fans of the film would be disappointed, and said that the game also had little relation to its predecessor. McDonald wrote that the only relation to the film are Maverick and James Tolkan in the game. Chick called Tolkan's involvement a "sad presence" in "about three minutes of embarrassingly chintzy video". Dultz believed that Tolkan gave a "credible performance" but stated that the game and supporting cast "crash soon after takeoff". Smith praised the voiceover work.

Top Gun: Hornet's Nest was a top-selling computer game in the U.S. during April 1999.
