= Susan Conant =

American mystery writer

- Education: Radcliffe College; Harvard University
- Occupation: Writer
- Writing career
- Genre: Mystery fiction

Susan Conant is an American mystery writer best known for her Dog Lover's Mysteries series, featuring magazine writer Holly Winter. Conant graduated from Radcliffe College with a degree in social relations, and a doctorate from Harvard University in human development. She is active in Alaskan Malamute Rescue and is a three-time recipient of the Dog Writers Association of America's Maxwell Award for Fiction Writing. She is also the author of the Cat Lover's Mysteries series and co-author with daughter Jessica Conant-Park of the Gourmet Girl Mysteries series.

== Publications ==
=== Dog Lover's Mysteries ===
- A New Leash on Death (1990) ISBN 978-1-55773-385-6
- Dead and Doggone (1990) ISBN 978-1-55773-425-9
- A Bite of Death (1991) ISBN 978-1-55773-490-7
- Paws Before Dying (1991) ISBN 978-1-55773-550-8
- Gone to the Dogs (1992) ISBN 978-0-553-29734-8
- Bloodlines (1992) ISBN 978-0-553-29886-4
- Ruffly Speaking (1994) ISBN 978-0-553-29484-2
- Black Ribbon (1995) ISBN 978-0-553-29875-8
- Stud Rites (1996) ISBN 978-0-553-57300-8
- Animal Appetite (1997) ISBN 978-0-553-57186-8
- The Barker Street Regulars (1998) ISBN 978-0-553-57655-9
- Evil Breeding (1999) ISBN 978-0-553-58052-5
- Creature Discomforts (2001) ISBN 978-0-553-58059-4 (paperback)
- The Wicked Flea (2002) ISBN 978-0-425-18885-9 (paperback)
- The Dogfather (2003) ISBN 978-0-425-19459-1 (paperback)
- Bride and Groom (2004) ISBN 978-0-425-20074-2 (paperback)
- Gaits of Heaven (2006) ISBN 978-0-425-21187-8 (hardcover)
- All Shots (2007) ISBN 978-0-425-21744-3 (hardcover)
- Brute Strength (2011) ISBN 978-0-7278-8067-3 (hardcover)
- Sire and Damn (2015) ISBN 978-1-5120-5378-4 (paperback)

=== Cat Lover's Mysteries ===
- Scratch the Surface (2005) about sleuth Felicity; cats Edith & Brigitte

=== Gourmet Girl Mysteries ===
Co-written with daughter Jessica Conant-Park.

- Steamed
- Simmer Down
- Turn Up the Heat
