= List of elections in 1903 =

The following elections occurred in the year 1903.

- 1903 Chilean parliamentary election
- 1903 Liechtenstein local elections
- May 1903 Serbian parliamentary election
- September 1903 Serbian parliamentary election
- 1903 Spanish general election
- 1903 conclave
- 1903 Swiss referendums

== Africa ==
- 1903 Cape Colony parliamentary election
- 1903 Liberian general election

== Asia ==
- 1903 Japanese general election
- 1903 Hong Kong sanitary board election

== Europe ==
=== Denmark ===
- 1903 Danish Folketing election
- 1903 Danish local elections

=== Germany ===
- 1903 German federal election

=== Norway ===
- 1903 Norwegian parliamentary election

=== United Kingdom ===
- 1903 Argyllshire by-election
- 1903 Barnard Castle by-election
- 1903 Belfast West by-election
- 1903 Camborne by-election
- 1903 Chertsey by-election
- 1903 Chorley by-election
- 1903 Dublin University by-election
- 1903 Dulwich by-election
- 1903 East Perthshire by-election
- 1903 Lewisham by-election
- 1903 Liverpool West Derby by-election
- 1903 Londonderry by-election
- 1903 Ludlow by-election
- 1903 Newmarket by-election
- 1903 Preston by-election
- 1903 Rochester by-election
- 1903 Rye by-election
- 1903 South Antrim by-election
- 1903 South Meath by-election
- 1903 St Andrews Burghs by-election
- 1903 Warwick and Leamington by-election
- 1903 Westhoughton by-election
- 1903 Woolwich by-election

== Americas ==
=== Canada ===
- 1903 British Columbia general election
- 1903 Yukon general election
- By-elections to the 9th Canadian Parliament
- 1903 Calgary municipal election
- 1903 Edmonton municipal election
- 1903 Manitoba general election
- 1903 New Brunswick general election

=== United States ===
- 1902 and 1903 United States Senate elections
  - in Alabama
  - in Arkansas
  - in California
  - in Colorado
  - in Connecticut
  - in Delaware
  - in Florida
  - in Idaho
  - in Illinois
  - in Indiana
  - in Kansas
  - in Michigan
  - in Missouri
  - in Nevada
  - in New Hampshire
  - in New York
  - in North Carolina
  - in North Dakota
  - in Oregon
  - in Pennsylvania
  - in South Carolina
  - in South Dakota
  - special election in South Dakota
  - in Utah
  - in Washington
  - in Wisconsin
- 1903 United States House of Representatives elections
  - 1903 Kansas's 7th congressional district special election
  - 1903 Ohio's 16th congressional district special election
  - 1903 Oregon's 1st congressional district special election
  - 1903 Pennsylvania's 4th congressional district special election
  - 1903 Texas's 8th congressional district special election
- gubernatorial elections
  - 1903 Iowa gubernatorial election
  - 1903 Kentucky gubernatorial election
  - 1903 Maryland gubernatorial election
  - 1903 Massachusetts gubernatorial election
  - 1903 Mississippi gubernatorial election
  - 1903 Ohio gubernatorial election
  - 1903 Rhode Island gubernatorial election
- mayoral elections
- 1903 Baltimore mayoral election
- 1903 Boston mayoral election
- 1903 Chicago mayoral election
- 1903 Columbus, Ohio mayoral election
- 1903 New York City mayoral election
- 1903 Philadelphia mayoral election
- 1903 San Diego mayoral election
- 1903 San Francisco mayoral election

=== Peru ===
- 1903 Peruvian presidential election

== Oceania ==
=== Australia ===
- 1903 Australian Senate election
- 1903 East Sydney by-election
- 1903 New South Wales referendum
- 1903 Tasmanian state election
- 1903 Glen Innes state by-election
- 1903 Tamworth state by-election
- 1903 Armidale state by-election
- 1903 Moree state by-election
- 1903 Waratah state by-election
- 1903 Willoughby state by-election
- 1903 Australian federal election
- Chanter v Blackwood
- 1903 Glen Innes state by-election
- Maloney v McEacharn
- 1903 Tamworth state by-election

=== New Zealand ===
- 1903 Invercargill mayoral election
- 1903 Wellington City mayoral election

== See also ==
- Category:1903 elections
