= Rothermel =

Surname

Rothermel is a surname. Notable people with the surname include:

- Bobby Rothermel (1870–1927), American infielder in Major League Baseball in 1899
- John Hoover Rothermel (1856–1922), Democratic member of the U.S. House of Representatives from Pennsylvania
- P. Frederick Rothermel (1850–1929), Pennsylvania lawyer and politician
- Peter F. Rothermel (1817–1895), American painter
