= 1895 Philadelphia mayoral election =

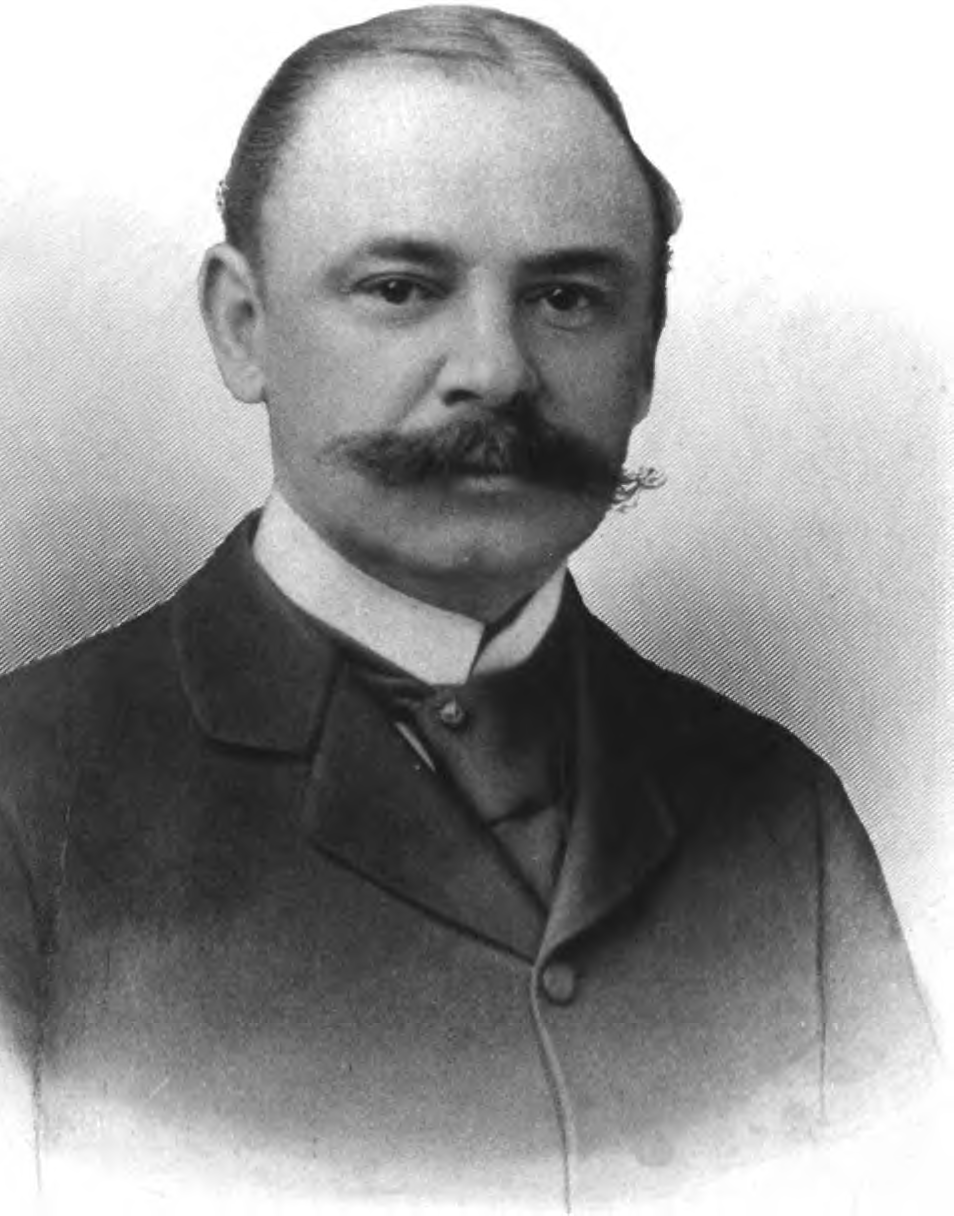

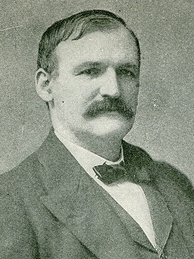
Nominee	Charles F. Warwick	Robert E. Pattison
Party	Republican	Democratic
Popular vote	137,863	79,879
Percentage	63.32%	36.69%
Mayor before election
Edwin Sydney Stuart
Republican
Elected mayor
Charles F. Warwick
Republican

The 1895 Philadelphia mayoral election saw the election Charles F. Warwick, who defeated former Pennsylvania Governor Robert E. Pattison.

== Results ==
1895 Philadelphia mayoral election
Party	Candidate	Votes	%
Republican	Charles F. Warwick	137,863	63.32%
Democratic	Robert E. Pattison	79,879	36.69%
Turnout		217,742	
