= 1903 Philadelphia mayoral election =

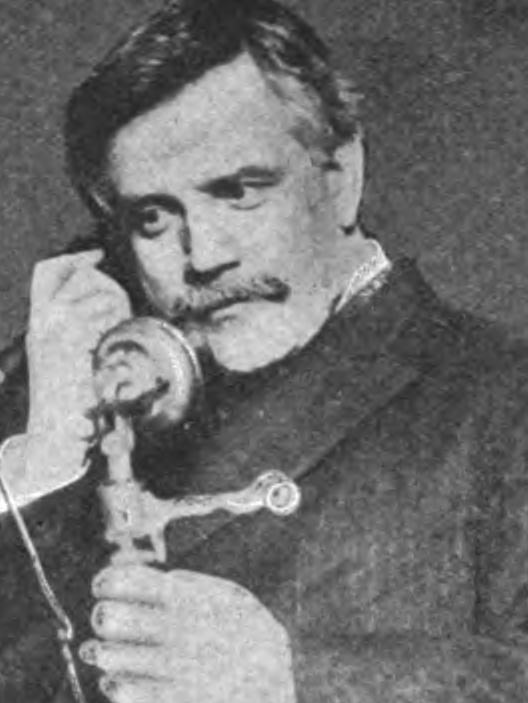

Nominee	John Weaver	Francis Fisher Kane
Party	Republican	Democratic
Popular vote	168,781	32,769
Percentage	82.71%	16.06%
Mayor before election
Samuel Howell Ashbridge
Republican
Elected mayor
John Weaver
Republican

The 1903 Philadelphia mayoral election saw the election John Weaver.

== Results ==
1903 Philadelphia mayoral election
Party	Candidate	Votes	%
Republican	John Weaver	168,781	82.71%
Democratic	Francis Fisher Kane	32,769	16.06%
Socialist	Howard H. Caldwell	1,500	0.74%
Prohibition	Alfred D. Calvert	1,015	0.50%
Turnout		204,065	
