= Francis Kane =

Francis Kane may refer to:

- Francis Kane (ice hockey) (1923–2016), Canadian ice hockey player
- Francis Fisher Kane (1866–1955), American lawyer
- Francis J. Kane (born 1942), American prelate of the Roman Catholic Church
- Francis X. Kane (1918–2013), American space planner and engineer
- Harold Robbins (1916–1997), American author born as Francis Kane

== See also ==
- Frank Kane (1895–1962), Major League Baseball outfielder
- Magenta (DC Comics), a supervillain whose real name is Frances Kane
