= 1907 Philadelphia mayoral election =

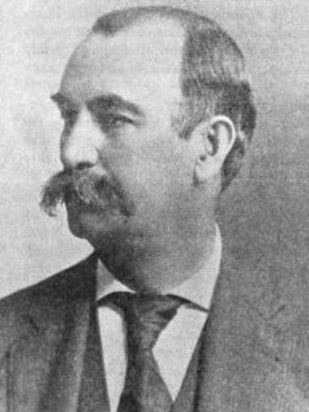

Nominee	John E. Reyburn	William Potter
Party	Republican	Democratic
Popular vote	130,585	97,582
Percentage	56.72%	42.39%
Mayor before election
John Weaver
Republican
Elected mayor
John E. Reyburn
Republican

The 1907 Philadelphia mayoral election saw the election of John Edger Reyburn as a Jeffersonian Republican over William Potter, who ran as a City-Democrat.

== Results ==
1907 Philadelphia mayoral election
Party	Candidate	Votes	%
Republican	John E. Reyburn	130,585	56.72%
Democratic	William Potter	97,582	42.39%
Socialist	Charles Sehl	1,649	0.72%
Prohibition	L.L. Eavenson	405	0.18%
Turnout		230,221	
