= Charles F. Warwick =

American politician (1852–1913)

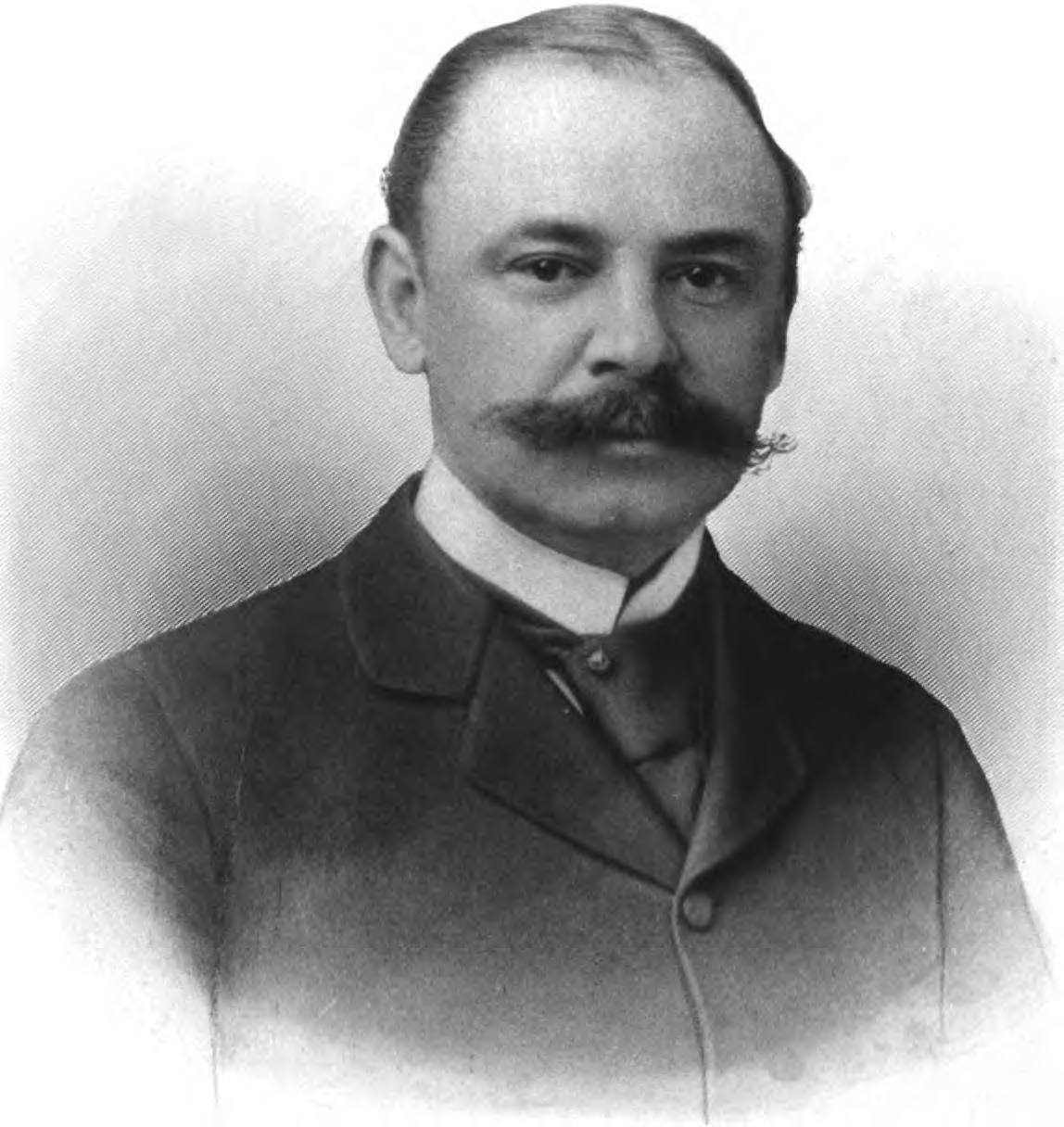

77th Mayor of Philadelphia
- In office April 1, 1895 – April 3, 1899
- Preceded by: Edwin Sydney Stuart
- Succeeded by: Samuel Howell Ashbridge

Personal details
- Born: Charles Franklin Warwick; February 14, 1852 Philadelphia, Pennsylvania, U.S.
- Died: April 4, 1913 (aged 61)
- Resting place: West Laurel Hill Cemetery
- Party: Republican
- Spouse: Ella Kate Griesemer (m. 1873)
- Children: 6
- Parent(s): Edward Warwick; Anne Minshall Warwick
- Education: University of Pennsylvania Law School
- Occupation: Politician, lawyer, author

Charles Franklin Warwick (February 14, 1852 – April 4, 1913) was an American author, lawyer, and Republican politician who served as mayor of Philadelphia from 1895 to 1899.

== Early life and career ==
Warwick was born in Philadelphia in 1852 to Edward Warwick, a merchant, and his wife, Anne Minshall Warwick. His father was a native of Philadelphia, while his mother was an immigrant from the United Kingdom. Warwick was educated at the Zane Street Grammar School in Philadelphia, and was admitted to Central High School, although he did not attend. Instead, Warwick took a job as a bookkeeper to help support his family. While doing so, he studied the law, working as an apprentice in the office of E. Spencer Miller, a local lawyer. He later attended classes at the University of Pennsylvania Law School.

Admitted to the bar in 1873, Warwick soon found a position in the city solicitor's office. That same year, he married Ella Kate Griesemer. The two would have six children: two girls and four boys. He was interested in politics from an early age, and gave speeches on behalf of John F. Hartranft in his campaign for governor of Pennsylvania in 1876. After the election, Warwick opened his own law office and practiced for several years until George Scott Graham, newly elected District Attorney of Philadelphia, hired him in 1880. During James G. Blaine's campaign for the Presidency in 1884, Warwick gave speeches in his favor in Indiana and Ohio. That same year, Warwick was elected City Solicitor by a 14,000-vote margin, running ahead of the ticket. Three years later, he was reelected by a 48,000-vote majority. As City Solicitor, much of his work involved suits about the railroads, including the construction of elevated railways and disputes over street paving where rails ran on the public roads.

== Mayor ==
In 1895, Philadelphia Republicans nominated Warwick for mayor. He was the candidate of the reform faction of the party, defeating machine boss Boies Penrose. Although one modern author described him as a "colorless but competent regular," Warwick was popular with his contemporaries. As mayor, he oversaw the visit of Li Hongzhang, the Chinese politician and general, to the city in 1896. He was supportive of the Reading Railroad's construction of the City Branch along Pennsylvania Avenue and encouraged development of the Delaware River waterfront area. He also campaigned, unsuccessfully, for the state capital to be relocated to Philadelphia from Harrisburg.

== Author ==
Mayors in Philadelphia were limited to one four-year term, so in 1899, Warwick left office. Besides continuing his law practice, he also wrote several books of historical scholarship, including Mirabeau and the French Revolution (1908), Danton and the French Revolution (1909), and Napoleon and the end of the French revolution (1910). A few years later, in 1913, he published a less formal local history, entitled Warwick's Keystone commonwealth; a review of the history of the great state of Pennsylvania, and a brief record of the growth of its chief city, Philadelphia. Warwick died later that year, and was buried in West Laurel Hill Cemetery in Bala Cynwyd, Pennsylvania.

== Sources ==
- McCarthy, Michael P. (Autumn 1995). "Reviewed Work: When Bosses Ruled Philadelphia: The Emergence of the Republican Machine, 1867–1933, by Peter McCaffery". The Journal of Interdisciplinary History. 26 (2): 338–339. doi:10.2307/206658. JSTOR 206658.
- Ockerbloom, John Mark (2015). "The Online Books Page for Charles F. Warwick". University of Pennsylvania.
- Williamson, Leland M., ed. (1898). Prominent and Progressive Pennsylvanians of the Nineteenth Century. Vol. 1. Philadelphia, Pennsylvania: The Philadelphia Record Co.
- The North American (1891). Philadelphia and Popular Philadelphians. Philadelphia, Pennsylvania: American Printing House.
- "Former Mayor Chas. F. Warwick Dies, Ill 7 Years". The Philadelphia Inquirer. April 5, 1913 – via Newspapers.com.

Political offices
Preceded by Edwin Sydney Stuart	Mayor of Philadelphia; 1895–1899	Succeeded by Samuel Howell Ashbridge
