= John E. Reyburn =

American politician (1845-1914)

John Edgar Reyburn
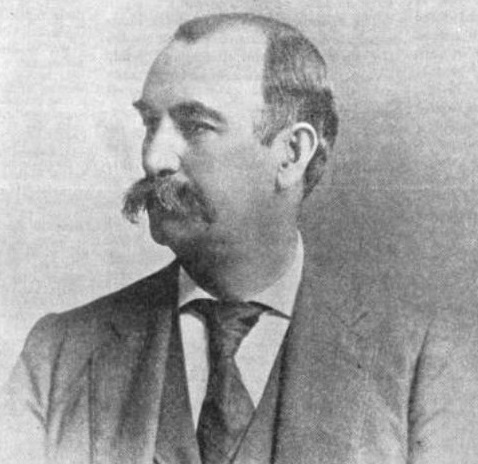

80th Mayor of Philadelphia
- In office April 1, 1907 – December 4, 1911
- Preceded by: John Weaver
- Succeeded by: Rudolph Blankenburg

Member of the U.S. House of Representatives from Pennsylvania's 2nd district
- In office November 6, 1906 – March 31, 1907
- Preceded by: Robert Adams, Jr.
- Succeeded by: Joel Cook

Member of the U.S. House of Representatives from Pennsylvania's 4th district
- In office February 18, 1890 – March 3, 1897
- Preceded by: William D. Kelley
- Succeeded by: James R. Young

President pro tempore of the Pennsylvania Senate
- In office 1883
- Preceded by: Hugh McNeil
- Succeeded by: Amos Herr Mylin

Member of the Pennsylvania Senate from the 5th district
- In office 1876–1890
- Preceded by: Thomas Valentine Cooper
- Succeeded by: Charles A. Porter

Member of the Pennsylvania House of Representatives
- In office 1871; 1874–1876

Personal details
- Born: February 7, 1845 New Carlisle, Ohio, U.S.
- Died: January 4, 1914 (aged 68) Washington, D.C., U.S.
- Resting place: Laurel Hill Cemetery, Philadelphia, Pennsylvania, U.S.
- Party: Republican
- Spouse: Margaretta Eleanor Crozier Reyburn
- Children: William Stuart Reyburn; Robert Crozier Reyburn; Eleanor Crozier Reyburn Harrington
- Education: Saunders Institute
- Profession: Attorney politician

John Edgar Reyburn (February 7, 1845 – January 4, 1914) was an American politician who served as a Republican member of the U.S. House of Representatives for Pennsylvania's 4th congressional district from 1890 to 1897 and Pennsylvania's 2nd congressional district from 1906 to 1907. He served as a member of the Pennsylvania House of Representatives in 1871 and again from 1874 to 1876. He served as a member of the Pennsylvania State Senate from 1876 to 1890 including as president pro tempore in 1883. He served as Mayor of Philadelphia from 1907 to 1911.

== Early life and education ==
Reyburn was born on February 7, 1845, in New Carlisle, Ohio, to William and Lydia Reader Crane Reyburn. He was taught by a private tutor and attended the Saunders Institute in West Philadelphia, Pennsylvania, and the University of Pennsylvania. He studied law under E. Spencer Miller, was admitted to the bar in 1870, and opened a law practice in Philadelphia.

== Career ==
Reyburn was a member of the Pennsylvania House of Representatives in 1871 and again in 1874 through 1876. He was a member of the Pennsylvania State Senate from 1876 through 1892 and served as president pro tempore during the session of 1883.

Elected to Congress as a Republican to fill the vacancy left by the death of William D. Kelley, Reyburn was reelected three times and served from February 18, 1890, to March 3, 1897, until he was an unsuccessful candidate for renomination in 1896. He was again elected to Congress to fill the vacancy left by the death of Robert Adams, Jr. and was reelected in 1906 to the 60th United States Congress, serving from November 6, 1906, to March 31, 1907, when he resigned to serve as Mayor of Philadelphia. Elected in the 1907 Philadelphia mayoral election, he served as mayor from April 1, 1907, to December 4, 1911.

As mayor, he led the Philadelphia Republican political machine and his tenure was marred with several instances of corruption. Reyburn was charged with receiving $450,000 from corporations and public officials. While several officials and contractors were convicted for bribery, Reyburn was not and claimed that his name was forged on the documents.

He was engaged in manufacturing in Philadelphia, but retained a residence in Washington, D.C.

== Personal life ==
He married Margaretta Eleanor Crozier in 1881 and together they had three children; Eleanor Reyburn Harrington, Robert Crozier Reyburn, and Congressman William Stuart Reyburn.

He was a yachting enthusiast and owned several estates in the United States and one in Canada.

== Death ==
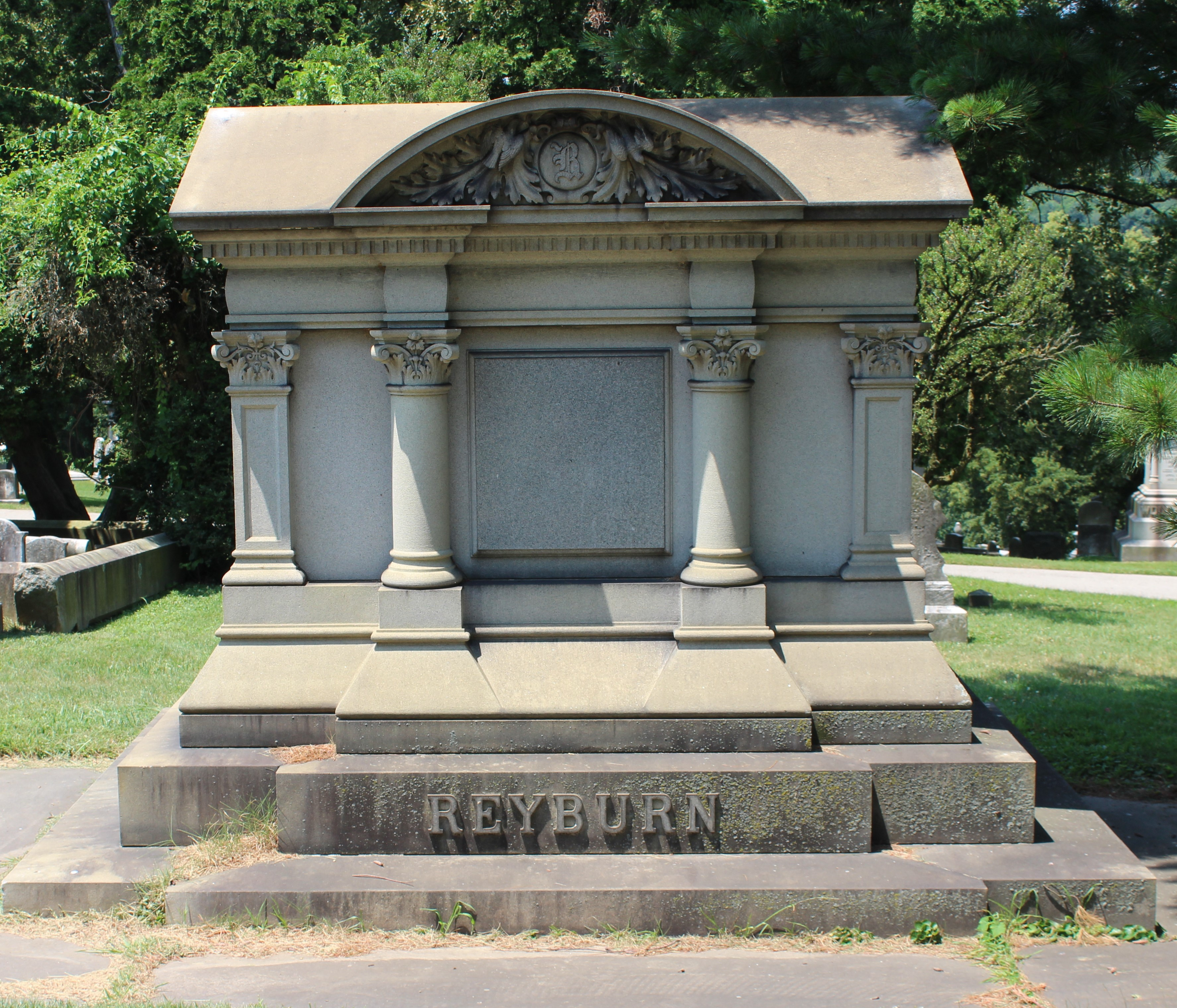
John E. Reyburn tombstone in Laurel Hill Cemetery

Reyburn died on January 4, 1914, in his Washington, D.C. residence and was interred in Laurel Hill Cemetery in Philadelphia, Pennsylvania.

Pennsylvania House of Representatives
Preceded by	Member of the Pennsylvania House of Representatives; 1871-1871	Succeeded by
Preceded by	Member of the Pennsylvania House of Representatives; 1874–1876	Succeeded by
Pennsylvania State Senate
Preceded by	Member of the Pennsylvania Senate; 1876-1890	Succeeded by
U.S. House of Representatives
Preceded by William D. Kelley	Member of the U.S. House of Representatives from Pennsylvania's 4th congressional district 1890–1897	Succeeded by James R. Young
Preceded by Robert Adams, Jr.	Member of the U.S. House of Representatives from Pennsylvania's 2nd congressional district 1906–1907	Succeeded by Joel Cook
Political offices
Preceded by John Weaver	Mayor of Philadelphia; 1907–1911	Succeeded by Rudolph Blankenburg
Preceded by Hugh McNeil	President pro tempore of the Pennsylvania Senate; 1883	Succeeded by Amos Herr Mylin
