= Robert Adams Jr. =

American politician (1849–1906)

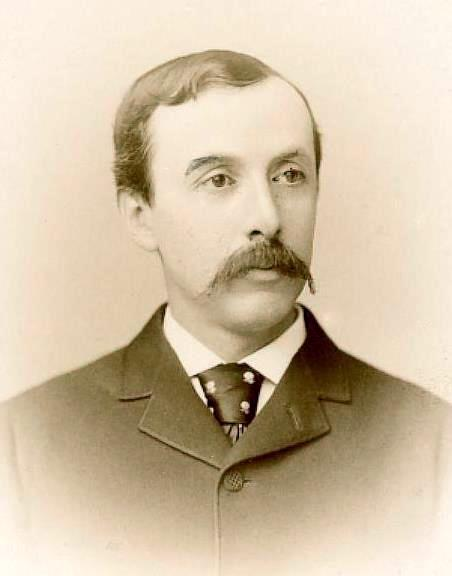

Member of the U.S. House of Representatives from Pennsylvania's 2nd district
- In office December 19, 1893 – June 1, 1906
- Preceded by: Charles O'Neill
- Succeeded by: John Reyburn

United States Minister to Brazil
- In office July 20, 1889 – March 1, 1890
- President: Benjamin Harrison
- Preceded by: Thomas Jarvis
- Succeeded by: Edwin Conger

Member of the Pennsylvania Senate from the 6th district
- In office January 2, 1883 – June 12, 1885
- Preceded by: A. Wilson Norris
- Succeeded by: Boies Penrose

Personal details
- Born: February 26, 1849 Philadelphia, Pennsylvania, U.S.
- Died: June 1, 1906 (aged 57) Washington, D.C., U.S.
- Cause of death: Suicide by gunshot
- Resting place: Laurel Hill Cemetery, Philadelphia, Pennsylvania
- Party: Republican
- Education: University of Pennsylvania

Robert Adams Jr. (February 26, 1849 – June 1, 1906) was an American diplomat and politician from Pennsylvania who served as a Republican member of the U.S. House of Representatives for Pennsylvania's 2nd congressional district from 1893 to 1906. He served as the United States Minister to Brazil from 1889 to 1890 and as a member of the Pennsylvania State Senate for the 6th district from 1883 to 1885.

== Early life and education ==
Adams was born in Philadelphia, Pennsylvania, to Robert and Matilda Maybin Hart Adams.

In 1869, he graduated from the University of Pennsylvania and was a member of St. Anthony Hall. He then attended Doctor Fairies Physical Institute in Philadelphia. He studied law under George W. Biddle and was admitted to the bar in 1872 but never practiced law.

== Career ==
He was a member of the United States Geological Survey during the explorations of Yellowstone National Park, from 1871 to 1875. Adams served as a member of the National Guards of Pennsylvania, from 1881 to 1895, serving as judge-advocate and major, also on start duty, and as a member of the Pennsylvania State Senate, from 1883 to 1887. He was an aide-de-camp on the staff of Governor Beaver of Pennsylvania with the rank of lieutenant-colonel in 1885.

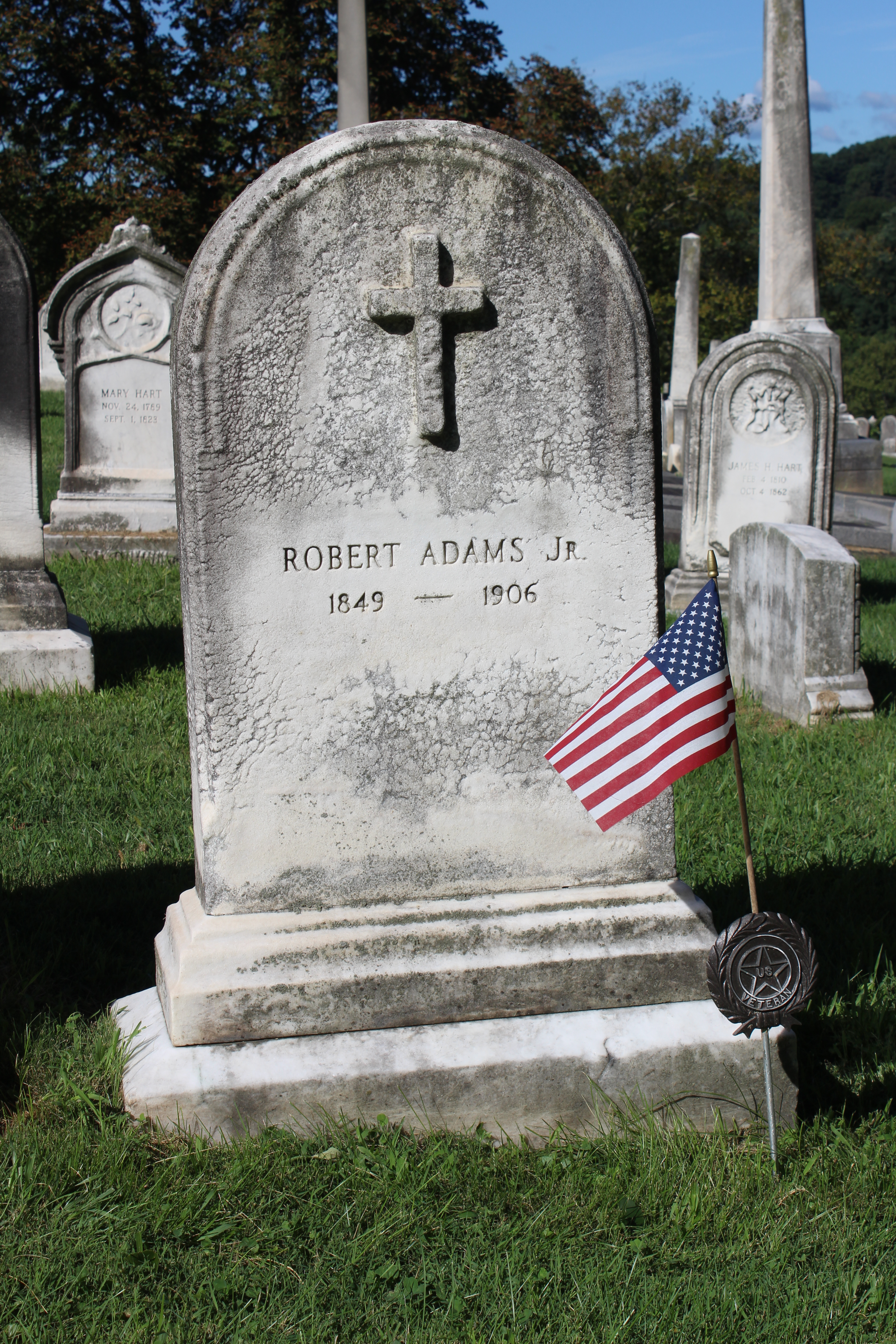
Robert Adams Jr. Gravestone in Laurel Hill Cemetery, Philadelphia, Pennsylvania

On April 10, 1880, Adams participated in a duel against Dr. James William White. Both Adams and White were members of First Troop Philadelphia City Cavalry; White wanted permission to wear the distinctive uniform of the Troop while he saw patients. Adams criticized White, and soon the two agreed to duel. They traveled to Maryland for the affair of honor. Both men fired at 15 paces, but neither man struck his mark and the affair ended without injury. At a meeting years later, Adams asked White, "You fired in the air, didn't you?" White said he did. Adams responded, "I didn't. I fired at you."

He was appointed United States Minister to Brazil on April 1, 1889, and served until June 1, 1890, when he resigned. He was elected to Congress as a Republican to fill the vacancy caused by the death of Charles O'Neill on December 19, 1893.

He then served as a Republican representative from the 2nd Pennsylvania district in the congresses 53rd, 54th and 55th, when acting chairman of the committee on foreign affairs and reported the Cuban resolutions and the declaration of war against Spain.

He was re-elected to the 56th, 57th and 58th congresses also from the 2nd Pennsylvania district, serving until his death, and was a member of various committees, while he contributed to periodicals and lectured.

== Death ==
Adams killed himself in Washington, D.C., on June 1, 1906, by shooting himself after heavy losses in stock speculation. He is interred at the Laurel Hill Cemetery in Philadelphia, Pennsylvania.

== Personal life ==
Adams was elected a member of the follow societies:

- Historical Society of Pennsylvania
- Pennsylvania Society of the Sons of the Revolution
- Society of the War of 1812
- Society of Colonial Wars
- Society of the Cincinnati

== See also ==
- List of members of the United States Congress who died in office (1900–1949)

== Sources ==
- United States Congress. "Robert Adams (id: A000044)". Biographical Directory of the United States Congress.

Diplomatic posts
Preceded by Thomas Jarvis	United States Minister to Brazil; 1889–1890	Succeeded by Edwin Conger
U.S. House of Representatives
Preceded by Charles O'Neill	Member of the U.S. House of Representatives from Pennsylvania's 2nd congressional district 1893–1906	Succeeded by John Reyburn
Pennsylvania State Senate
Preceded by A. Wilson Norris	Member of the Pennsylvania Senate for the 6th district 1883–1885	Succeeded by Boies Penrose
