= Joel Cook =

American politician

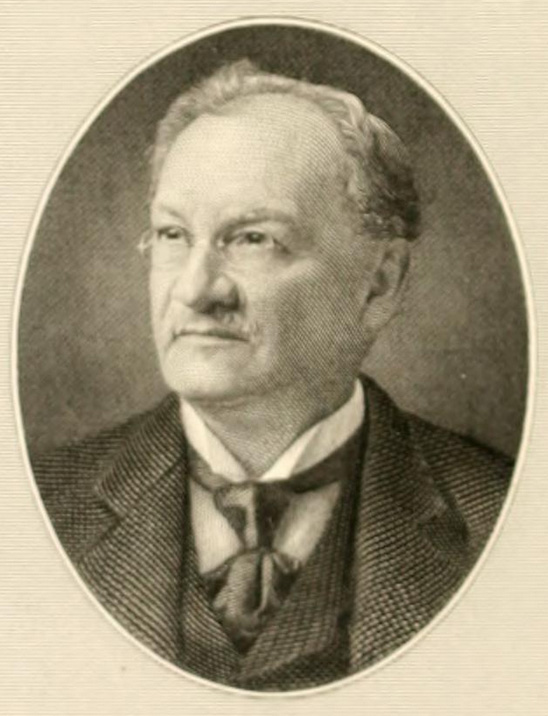

Member of the U.S. House of Representatives from Pennsylvania's 2nd district
- In office November 5, 1907 – December 15, 1910
- Preceded by: John E. Reyburn
- Succeeded by: William S. Reyburn

Personal details
- Born: March 20, 1842 Philadelphia, Pennsylvania, U.S.
- Died: December 15, 1910 (aged 68)
- Resting place: Laurel Hill Cemetery, Philadelphia, Pennsylvania, U.S.
- Party: Republican
- Education: University of Pennsylvania

Joel Cook (March 20, 1842 – December 15, 1910) was an American politician from Pennsylvania who served as a Republican member of the United States House of Representatives for Pennsylvania's 2nd congressional district from 1907 to 1910.

== Biography ==
Joel Cook was born in Philadelphia, Pennsylvania. He graduated from Central High School in 1859. He studied law with William B. Reed and at the University of Pennsylvania. He was admitted to the bar in 1863.

He practiced law for a few years but left the profession to become a journalist. During the American Civil War, Cook was a correspondent in Washington, D.C., and with the Army of the Potomac for the Philadelphia Press. He was on the editorial staff of the Philadelphia Public Ledger from 1865 to 1882, and the financial editor from 1883 to 1907. He also worked as the chief American correspondent for the London Times.

He was president of the board of wardens for the port of Philadelphia (1891–1907). He also served as president of the board of trade and of the Vessel Owners and Captains’ Association and as member of the Union League of Philadelphia.

In 1895, Cook was elected to the American Philosophical Society.

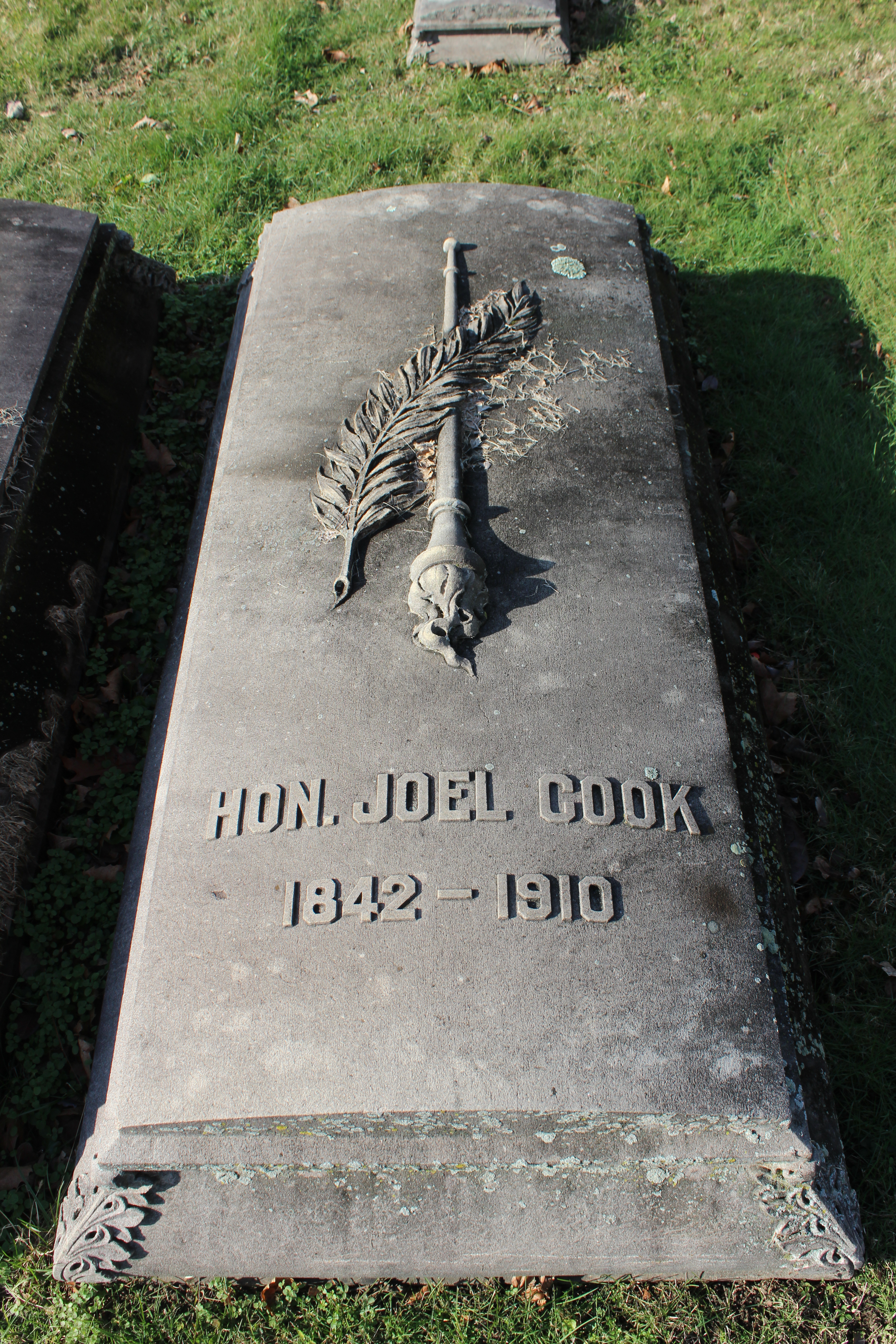
Joel Cook tombstone in Laurel Hill Cemetery

He was elected to Congress as a Republican to fill the vacancy caused by the resignation of John E. Reyburn. He was reelected to the 61st United States Congress and served from 1907 until his death in Philadelphia. He was interred at Laurel Hill Cemetery in Philadelphia.

== Legacy ==
The Cook-Wissahickon School in Philadelphia is named in his honor.

== Bibliography ==
- England, Picturesque and Descriptive, Philadelphia, Porter and Coates, 1882
- A Holiday Tour in Europe, Philadelphia, David McKay, Publisher, 1889
- An Eastern Tour at Home, Philadelphia, David McKay, Publisher, 1889
- America, Picturesque and Descriptive - Volume 1, Philadelphia, Henry T. Coates & Co., 1900
- The Philadelphia National Bank - A Century's Record 1803-1903, Philadelphia, Wm.F. Fell Company, 1903
- Switzerland, Picturesque and Descriptive, Philadelphia, Henry T. Coates & Co., 1904
- America and Her Insular Possessions - Volume 2, Philadelphia, The John C. Winston Co., 1906
- Eastern Countries, Philadelphia, The John C. Winston Co., 1910

== See also ==
- List of members of the United States Congress who died in office (1900–1949)

== Sources ==
- United States Congress. "Joel Cook (id: C000718)". Biographical Directory of the United States Congress. Retrieved on 2009-04-25
- The Political Graveyard

U.S. House of Representatives
Preceded by John E. Reyburn	Member of the U.S. House of Representatives from Pennsylvania's 2nd congressional district 1907–1910	Succeeded by William S. Reyburn
