= Palmer raids =

United States government arrests of leftists, 1919–20

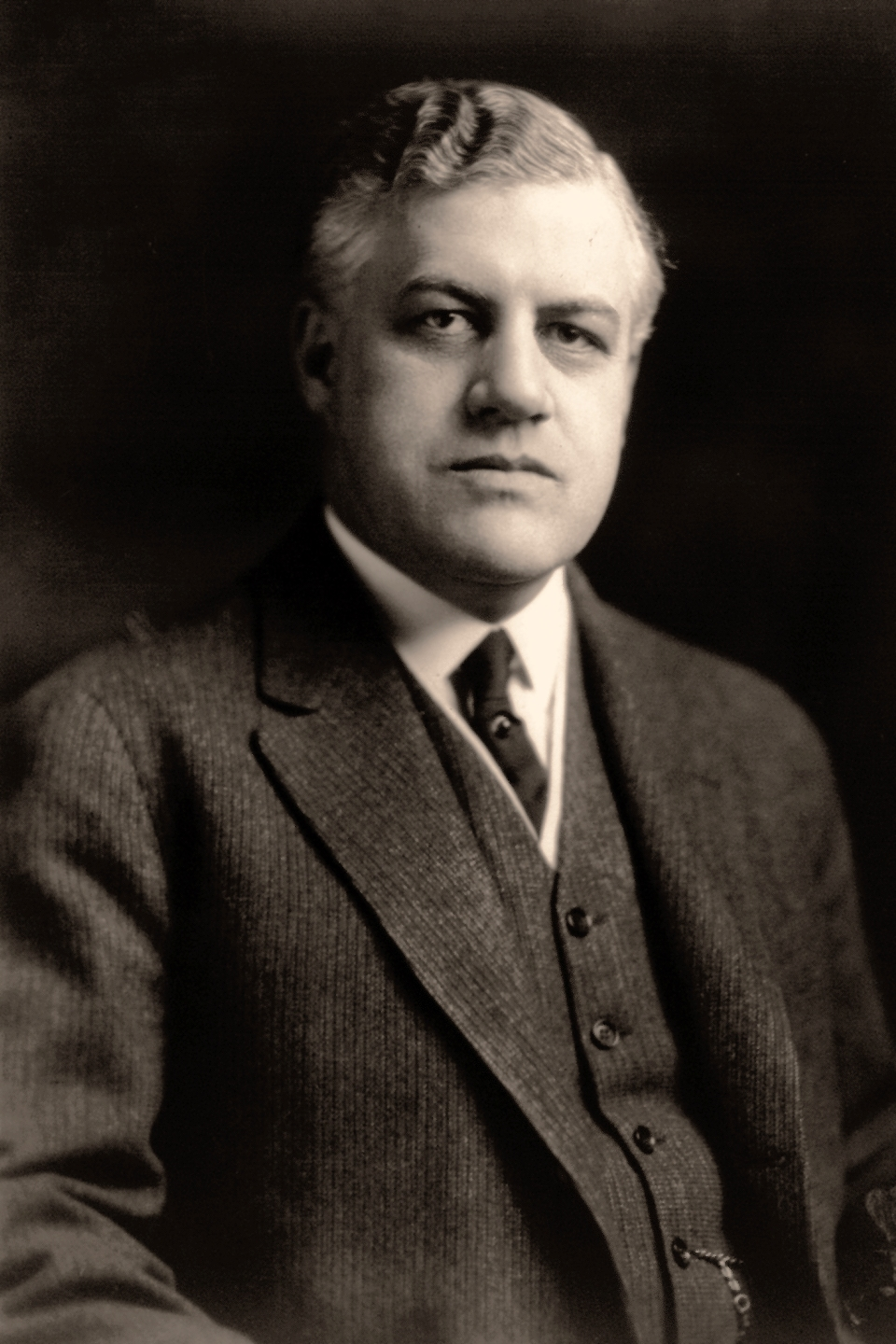
A. Mitchell Palmer

The Palmer raids were a series of raids conducted in November 1919 and January 1920 by the United States Department of Justice under the administration of President Woodrow Wilson to capture and arrest suspected socialists, especially anarchists and communists, and deport them from the United States. The raids particularly targeted Italian immigrants and Eastern European Jewish immigrants with alleged leftist ties, with particular focus on Italian anarchists and immigrant leftist labor activists. The raids and arrests occurred under the leadership of United States Attorney General A. Mitchell Palmer, with 6,000 people arrested across 36 cities. Though 556 foreign citizens were deported, including a number of prominent leftist leaders, Palmer's efforts were largely frustrated by officials at the U.S. Department of Labor, which had authority for deportations and objected to Palmer's methods.

The Palmer raids occurred in the larger context of the first Red Scare, a period of anti-communism in the U.S. in the years immediately following World War I and the successful Russian Revolution. There were strikes that garnered national attention, and prompted race riots in more than 30 cities, as well as two sets of bombings in April and June 1919, including one bomb mailed to Palmer's home in response to his policy of politically motivated mass arrests and deportations.

== Background ==
During the First World War, there was a nationwide right-wing campaign in the United States against the real and imagined divided political loyalties of immigrants and ethnic groups, who were feared to have too much loyalty for their nations of origin. In 1915, President Wilson warned against hyphenated Americans who, he charged, had "poured the poison of disloyalty into the very arteries of our national life." "Such creatures of passion, disloyalty and anarchy", Wilson continued, "must be crushed out". The Russian Revolutions of 1917 added special force to fear of labor agitators and partisans of ideologies such as anarchism and communism. The general strike in Seattle in February 1919 represented a new development in labor unrest.

The fears of Wilson and other government officials were confirmed when Galleanists—Italian immigrant followers of the anarchist Luigi Galleani—carried out a series of bombings in April and June 1919. At the end of April, some 30 Galleanist letter bombs had been mailed to a host of individuals, mostly prominent government officials and businessmen, but also law enforcement officials. Only a few reached their targets, and not all exploded when opened. Some people suffered injuries, including a housekeeper in Senator Thomas W. Hardwick's residence, who had her hands blown off. On June 2, 1919, the second wave of bombings occurred, when several much larger package bombs were detonated by Galleanists in eight American cities, including one that damaged the home of Attorney General A. Mitchell Palmer in Washington, D.C. At least one person was killed in this second attack, night watchman William Boehner, and fears were raised because it occurred in the capital. Flyers declaring war on capitalists in the name of anarchist principles accompanied each bomb.

=== Preparations ===
In June 1919, Attorney General Palmer told the House Appropriations Committee that all evidence promised that radicals would "on a certain day...rise up and destroy the government at one fell swoop." He requested an increase in his budget to $2,000,000 from $1,500,000 to support his investigations of radicals, but Congress limited the increase to $100,000.

An initial raid in July 1919 against an anarchist group in Buffalo, New York, achieved little when a federal judge tossed out Palmer's case. He found in the case that the three arrested radicals, charged under a law dating from the Civil War, had proposed transforming the government by using their free speech rights and not by violence. That taught Palmer that he needed to exploit the more powerful immigration statutes that authorized the deportation of alien anarchists, violent or not. To do that, he needed to enlist the cooperation of officials at the Department of Labor. Only the Secretary of Labor could issue warrants for the arrest of alien violators of the Immigration Acts, and only he could sign deportation orders following a hearing by an immigration inspector.

On August 1, 1919, Palmer named 24-year-old J. Edgar Hoover to head a new division of the Justice Department's Bureau of Investigation, the General Intelligence Division (GID), with responsibility for investigating the programs of radical groups and identifying their members. The Boston Police Strike in early September raised concerns about possible threats to political and social stability. On October 17, the Senate passed a unanimous resolution demanding Palmer explain what actions he had or had not taken against radical aliens and why.

At 9 p.m. on November 7, 1919, a date chosen because it was the second anniversary of the Bolshevik revolution, agents of the Bureau of Investigation, together with local police, executed a series of well-publicized and violent raids against the Union of Russian Workers in 12 cities. Newspaper accounts reported some were "badly beaten" during the arrests. Many later swore they were threatened and beaten during questioning. Government agents cast a wide net, bringing in some American citizens, passersby who admitted being Russian, some not members of the Russian Workers. Others were teachers conducting night school classes in space shared with the targeted radical group. Arrests far exceeded the number of warrants. Of 650 arrested in New York City, the government managed to deport just 43. (Note: Post says eleven cities. Cf.,)

When Palmer replied to the Senate's questions of October 17, he reported that his department had amassed 60,000 names with great effort. Required by the statutes to work through the Department of Labor, they had arrested 250 dangerous radicals in the November 7 raids. He proposed a new Anti-Sedition Law to enhance his authority to prosecute anarchists.

The Palmer Raids were an extension of the Wilson's administration's attack on dissent and Freedom of Speech.

== Raids and arrests in January 1920 ==
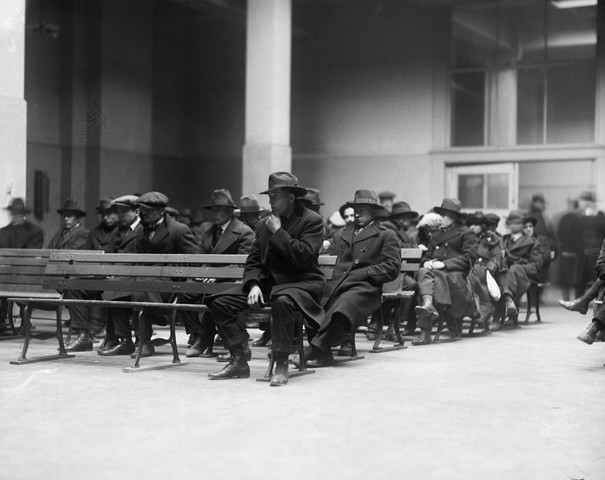
Men arrested in raids awaiting deportation hearings on Ellis Island, January 13, 1920

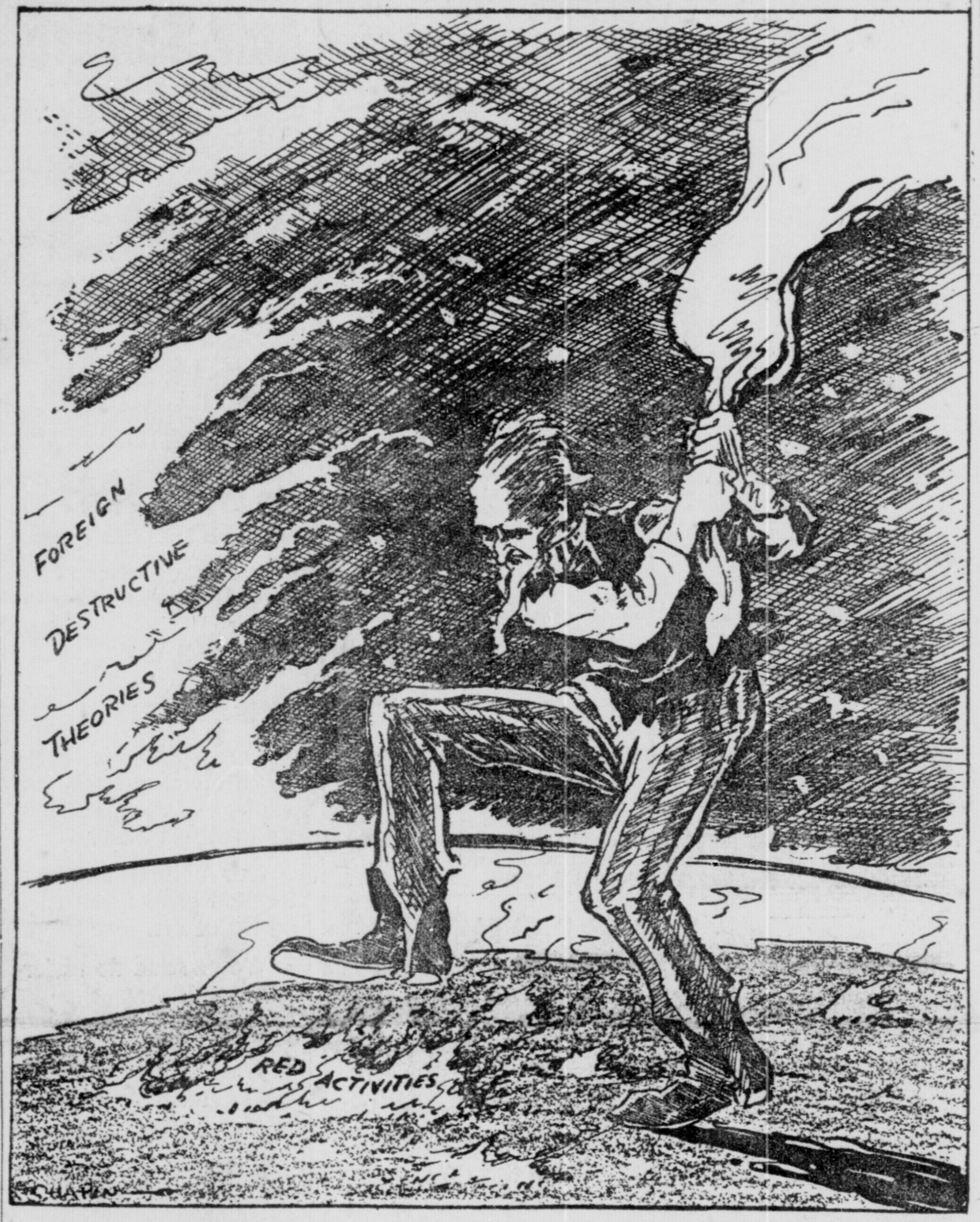
Cartoon by Archibald B. Chapin on the South Bend News-Times – November 8, 1919

Inasmuch as Attorney General Palmer struggled with exhaustion and devoted all his energies to the United Mine Workers coal strike in November and December 1919, Hoover organized the next raids. He successfully persuaded the Department of Labor to ease its insistence on promptly alerting those arrested of their right to an attorney. Instead, Labor issued instructions that its representatives could wait until after the case against the defendant was established, "in order to protect government interests." Less openly, Hoover decided to interpret Labor's agreement to act against the Communist Party to include a different organization, the Communist Labor Party. Finally, despite the fact that Secretary of Labor William B. Wilson insisted that more than membership in an organization was required for a warrant, Hoover worked with more compliant Labor officials and overwhelmed Labor staff to get the warrants he wanted. Justice Department officials, including Palmer and Hoover, later claimed ignorance of such details.

The Justice Department launched a series of raids on January 2, 1920, with follow-up operations over the next few days. Smaller raids extended over the next 6 weeks. At least 3,000 were arrested, and many others were held for various lengths of time. The entire enterprise replicated the November action on a larger scale, including arrests and seizures without search warrants, as well as detention in overcrowded and unsanitary holding facilities. Hoover later admitted "clear cases of brutality." The raids covered more than 30 cities and towns in 23 states, but those west of the Mississippi and south of the Ohio were "publicity gestures" designed to make the effort appear nationwide in scope. (Note: States (cities where available): California (Los Angeles, San Francisco), Colorado (Denver), Connecticut (Ansonia, Bridgeport, Hartford, Meriden, New Haven, New London, South Manchester, Waterbury), Florida, Illinois (Chicago, Rockford, East St. Louis), Indiana, Iowa (Des Moines), Kansas (Kansas City), Maine, Maryland, Massachusetts (Boston, Chelsea, Brockton, Bridgewater, Norwood, Worcester, Springfield, Chicopee Falls, Holyoke, Gardner, Fitchburg, Lowell, Lawrence, Haverhill), Michigan (Detroit), Minnesota (St. Paul), Nebraska (Omaha), New Hampshire (Claremont, Derry, Lincoln, Manchester, Nashua, Portsmouth), New Jersey (Camden), New York (Buffalo and "nearby towns", New York City), Ohio (Cleveland, Toledo, Youngstown), Oregon (Portland), Pennsylvania (Chester, Pittsburgh), Washington (Spokane), Wisconsin (Milwaukee, Racine). Others were arrested in West Virginia by agents working from Pittsburgh.) Because the raids targeted entire organizations, agents arrested everyone found in organization meeting halls, not only arresting non-radical organization members but also visitors who did not belong to a target organization, and sometimes American citizens not eligible for arrest and deportation. (Note: Passim)

The Department of Justice at one point claimed to have taken possession of several bombs, but after a few iron balls were displayed to the press, they were never mentioned again. All the raids netted a total of just four ordinary pistols.

While most press coverage continued to be positive, with criticism only from leftist publications like The Nation and The New Republic, one attorney raised the first noteworthy protest. Francis Fisher Kane, the U.S. Attorney for the Eastern District of Pennsylvania, resigned in protest. In his letter of resignation to the President and the Attorney General, he wrote:

It seems to me that the policy of raids against large numbers of individuals is generally unwise and very apt to result in injustice. People not really guilty are likely to be arrested and railroaded through their hearings... We appear to be attempting to repress a political party... By such methods, we drive underground and make dangerous what was not dangerous before.

Palmer replied that he could not use individual arrests to treat an "epidemic" and asserted his own fidelity to constitutional principles. He added: "The Government should encourage free political thinking and political action, but it certainly has the right for its own preservation to discourage and prevent the use of force and violence to accomplish that which ought to be accomplished, if at all, by parliamentary or political methods." The Washington Post endorsed Palmer's claim for urgency over legal process: "There is no time to waste on hairsplitting over infringement of liberty."

== Aftermath ==
The individuals captured during the Palmer raids were held in abysmal conditions: at Deer Island, six hundred prisoners were placed in barracks intended to house three hundred, with no heat and dwindling food; many were marched through Boston in chains and handcuffs, showered with the spit and trash of bystanders. In Detroit, eight hundred prisoners were crammed into a windowless corridor with only one working bathroom and no beds. At Ellis Island, hundreds of men were forced to sleep on steel slabs without mattresses.

In a few weeks, after changes in personnel at the Department of Labor, Palmer faced a new and very independent-minded Acting Secretary of Labor in Assistant Secretary of Labor Louis Freeland Post, who canceled more than 2,000 warrants as being illegal. Of the 10,000 arrested, 3,500 were held by authorities in detention; 556 resident aliens were eventually deported under the Immigration Act of 1918.

At a Cabinet meeting in April 1920, Palmer called on Secretary of Labor William B. Wilson to fire Post, but Wilson defended him. The President listened to his feuding department heads and offered no comment about Post, but he ended the meeting by telling Palmer that he should "not let this country see red." Secretary of the Navy Josephus Daniels, who made notes of the conversation, thought the Attorney General had merited the President's "admonition", because Palmer "was seeing red behind every bush and every demand for an increase in wages."

Palmer's supporters in Congress responded with an attempt to impeach Louis Post or, failing that, to censure him. The drive against Post began to lose energy when Attorney General Palmer's forecast of an attempted radical uprising on May Day 1920 failed to occur. Then, in testimony before the House Rules Committee on May 7–8, Post proved "a convincing speaker with a caustic tongue" and defended himself so successfully that Congressman Edward W. Pou, a Democrat presumed to be an enthusiastic supporter of Palmer, congratulated him: "I feel that you have followed your sense of duty absolutely."

On May 28, 1920, the nascent American Civil Liberties Union (ACLU), which was founded in response to the raids, published its Report Upon the Illegal Practices of the United States Department of Justice, which carefully documented unlawful activities in arresting suspected radicals, illegal entrapment by agents provocateur, and unlawful incommunicado detention. Such prominent lawyers and law professors as Felix Frankfurter, Roscoe Pound and Ernst Freund signed it. Harvard Professor Zechariah Chafee criticized the raids and attempts at deportations and the lack of legal process in his 1920 volume Freedom of Speech. He wrote: "That a Quaker should employ prison and exile to counteract evil-thinking is one of the saddest ironies of our time."

The Rules Committee gave Palmer a hearing in June, where he attacked Post and other critics whose "tender solicitude for social revolution and perverted sympathy for the criminal anarchists...set at large among the people the very public enemies whom it was the desire and intention of the Congress to be rid of." The press saw the dispute as evidence of the Wilson administration's ineffectiveness and division as it approached its final months.

In June 1920, a decision by Massachusetts District Court Judge George W. Anderson ordered the discharge of 17 arrested aliens and denounced the Department of Justice's actions. He wrote that "a mob is a mob, whether made up of Government officials acting under instructions from the Department of Justice, or of criminals and loafers and the vicious classes." His decision effectively prevented any renewal of the raids.

Palmer, once seen as a likely presidential candidate, lost his bid to win the Democratic nomination for president later in the year. The anarchist bombing campaign, following the ideology of propaganda of the deed, continued intermittently in the U.S. for another twelve years.

== Epilogue ==
The legal issues involved in the 1919 Palmer raids during the Woodrow Wilson administration have been resurrected during the deportations during the second Trump administration.

Current Trump administration policy has been compared to the Palmer raids, and the "'Repatriations' of the 1930s":

Former President Donald Trump's call for historic "mass deportations" of immigrants from the United States is forcing the nation to revisit past expulsions that left deep wounds still felt today. The big picture: From the Palmer raids of Jewish and Italian immigrants of 1919 to the mass deportation of Mexican immigrants in the 1950s, previous deportation operations ignored civil liberties, heightened racial tensions and disrupted families of American citizens for generations.

It has also been compared to the Irish Expulsion, the Palmer raids and the "Soviet Ark", the Mexican Repatriation during The Great Depression, Operation Wetback during the Dwight D. Eisenhower administration, and "The Deporter-in-Chief" during the Barack Obama administration.

In the 105 years between 1892 and 1997, the United States deported 2.1 million people. Between 2001 and 2008, during the Presidency of George W. Bush, about 2.0 million people were deported, while between 2009 and 2016, during the Presidency of Barack Obama, about 3.2 million people were deported.

== See also ==
- 1918-1920 New York City rent strikes
- Deportation and removal from the United States
- Espionage Act of 1917
- Industrial Workers of the World
- Internment of Japanese Americans
- McCarthyism
- Sedition Act of 1918
- Visa and deportation controversies in the second Trump administration

== Bibliography ==
- Avakov, Aleksandr Vladimirovich (2007). Plato's Dreams Realized: Surveillance and Citizen Rights from KGB to FBI. Algora Publishing. ISBN 978-0-87586-495-2. ISBN 0-87586-495-3.
- Avrich, Paul (1991). Sacco and Vanzetti: The Anarchist Background. Princeton University Press. ISBN 978-0691026046. ISBN 0691026041.
- Chafee, Zechariah (1920). Freedom of Speech. New York: Harcourt, Brace, and Howe.
- Coben, Stanley (1963). A. Mitchell Palmer: Politician. New York: Columbia University Press. OCLC 200640.
- Daniels, Josephus (1946). The Wilson Era: Years of War and After, 1917–1923. Chapel Hill: University of North Carolina Press.
- Dunn, Robert W. (1948). The Palmer Raids. New York: International Publishers.
- Finan, Christopher M. (2007). From the Palmer Raids to the Patriot Act: A History of the Fight for Free Speech in America. Beacon Press. ISBN 978-0-8070-4428-5.
- Hagedorn, Ann (2007). Savage Peace: Hope and Fear in America, 1919. New York: Simon & Schuster. ISBN 9781416539711.
- Kennedy, David M. (1980). Over Here: The First World War and American Society. New York: Oxford University Press. ISBN 0195027299.
- Murray, Robert K. (1955). Red Scare: A Study in National Hysteria, 1919–1920. Minneapolis: University of Minnesota Press.
- Pietrusza, David (2007). 1920: The Year of Six presidents. New York: Carroll & Graf. ISBN 978-0786716227. ISBN 0786716223.
- Post, Louis F. (December 20, 2010) [1923]. The Deportations Delirium of Nineteen-twenty: A Personal Narrative of a Historic Official Experience (Reissued ed.). New York: Gale, Making of Modern Law. ISBN 978-1-4102-0553-7. ISBN 0-306-71882-0.
- Shepley, Nick (2015). The Palmer Raids and the Red Scare: 1918-1920: Justice and Liberty for All. Andrews UK Limited. ISBN 978-1-84989-945-1.

Further reading

- Cohen, Harlan Grant (2003). "The (Un)favorable Judgment of History: Deportation Hearings, the Palmer Raids, and the Meaning of History" (PDF). New York University Law Review. 78: 1431.
- Popkova, Anna (January 2, 2022). "Imagining the Russian Community: Novoye Russkoe Slovo, the First Red Scare, and the Palmer Raids, 1919-1920". Journalism History. 48 (1). Kalamazoo, Michigan: Western Michigan University: 41–60. doi:10.1080/00947679.2022.2027140. S2CID 246293091.
- Pusey, Allen (2015). "Palmer Raids Target Immigrants". ABA Journal. 101. American Bar Association: 100.
