= William S. Reyburn =

American politician (1882–1946)

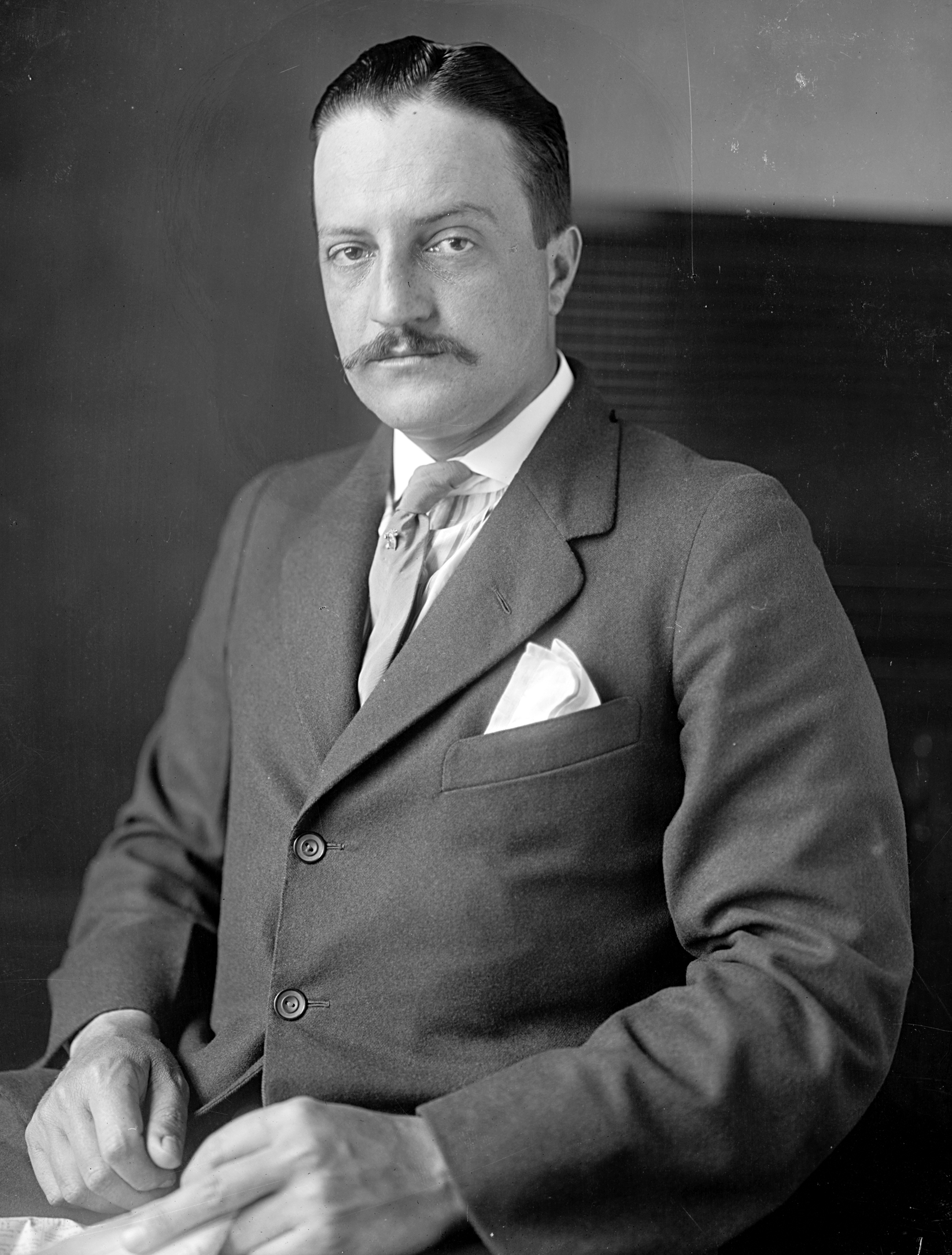

Member of the U.S. House of Representatives from Pennsylvania's 2nd district
- In office May 23, 1911 – March 3, 1913
- Preceded by: Joel Cook
- Succeeded by: George S. Graham

Pennsylvania House of Representatives Philadelphia County
- In office 1909 – May 15, 1911

Personal details
- Born: December 17, 1882 Philadelphia, Pennsylvania, U.S.
- Died: July 25, 1946 (aged 63) New Haven, Connecticut, U.S.
- Resting place: Laurel Hill Cemetery, Philadelphia, Pennsylvania, U.S.
- Party: Republican
- Education: Yale University; University of Pennsylvania Law School
- Profession: Attorney, Politician

William Stuart Reyburn (December 17, 1882 – July 25, 1946) was an American politician who served as a Republican member of the U.S. House of Representatives for Pennsylvania's 2nd congressional district from 1911 to 1913. He served as a member of the Pennsylvania House of Representatives for Philadelphia County from 1909 to 1911.

== Early life and education ==
Reyburn was born on December 17, 1882, in Philadelphia, Pennsylvania, to Margaret (nee Crozier) and John E. Reyburn, a U.S. congressman and mayor of Philadelphia. He attended The Hill School in Pottstown, Pennsylvania. He graduated from the Sheffield Scientific School at Yale University in 1904, where he was a member of St. Anthony Hall. After graduation, he traveled for a year overseas and was a member of President William Howard Taft's party that visited the Philippines, Japan, and China. He studied law at Columbia University for two years and graduated from the University of Pennsylvania Law School in 1907 and the law department of Georgetown University in Washington, D.C.

== Career ==
Reyburn was admitted to the Bar in 1908 and practiced law in Philadelphia, Pennsylvania, and Washington, D.C.

He served twice as a Republican member of the Pennsylvania House of Representatives for Philadelphia County from 1909 to 1910 and from 1911 to 1912. He resigned on May 25, 1911. As a legislator, he backed the Pension Bill which gave state funds to veterans of the American Civil War from Pennsylvania.

May 23, 1911, he was elected to the 62nd Congress to fill the vacancy caused by the death of Joel Cook. He served in Congress from May 23, 1911, to March 3, 1913 and declined to be a candidate for renomination in 1912.

== Personal life ==
On June 10, 1911, Reyburn married Georgie Fontaine Maury and together they had two sons. Georgie divorced Reyburn in 1918 on the basis of "intolerable cruelty". He was married a second time to Martha Gardner. He was an Episcopalian and a member of the Racket Club in Philadelphia, the Freemasons and the Union League.

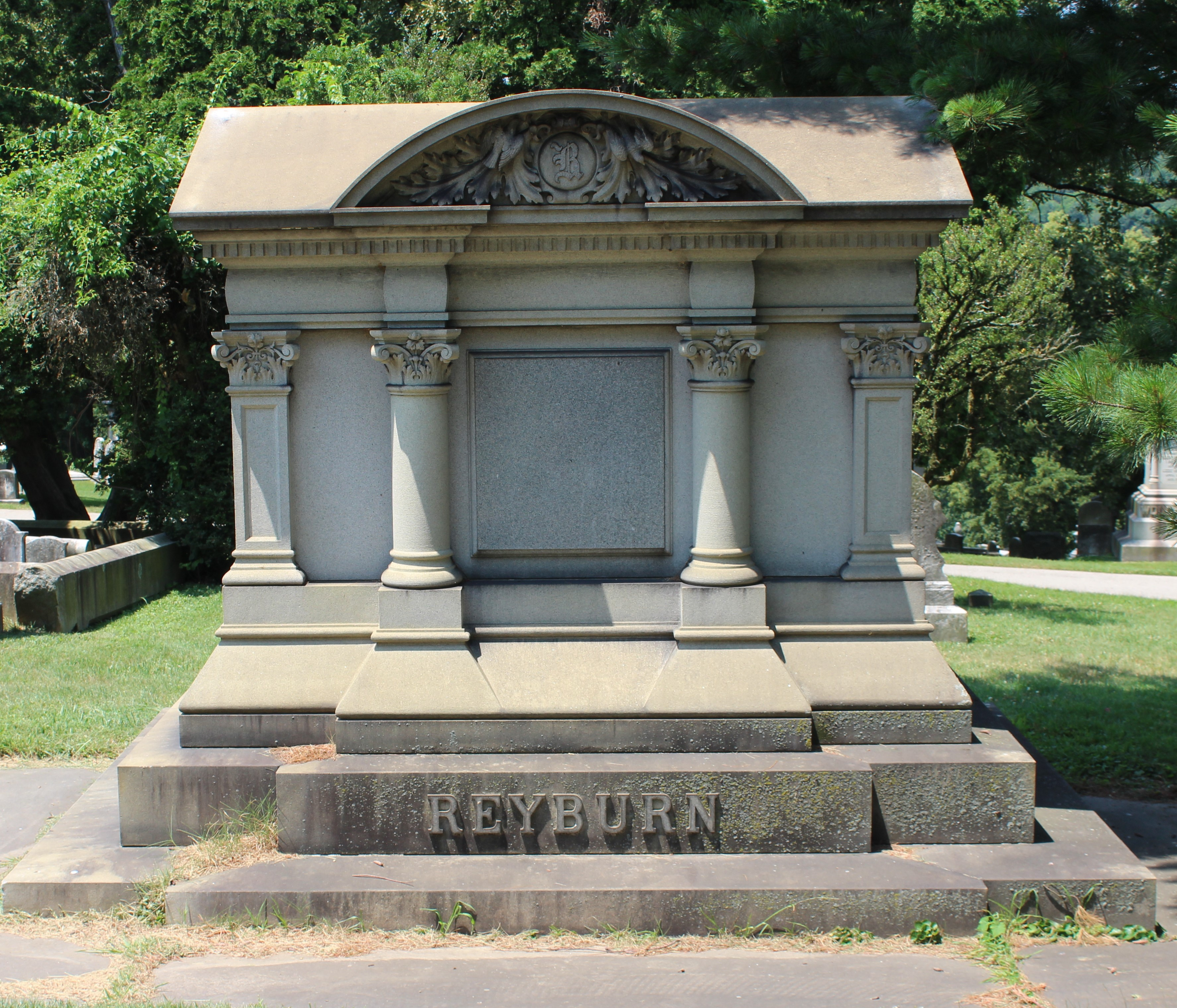
William S. Reyburn tombstone in Laurel Hill Cemetery

After Congress, Reyburn retired from active business pursuits. He retired to Aiken, South Carolina, and later moved to his estate "Black Hill" in Old Lyme, Connecticut. He died on July 25, 1946, in New Haven, Connecticut, and was interred at Laurel Hill Cemetery in Philadelphia.

Pennsylvania House of Representatives
Preceded by	Member of the Pennsylvania House of Representatives Philadelphia County; 1909-1911	Succeeded by
U.S. House of Representatives
Preceded by Joel Cook	Member of the U.S. House of Representatives from Pennsylvania's 2nd congressional district 1911–1913	Succeeded by George S. Graham
