= 1903 Baltimore mayoral election =

Baltimore mayoral election, 1903
- May 5, 1903
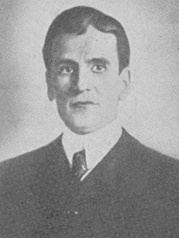

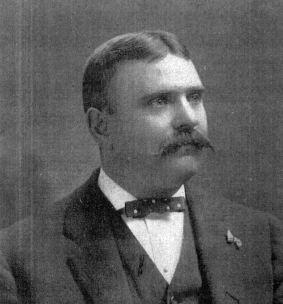
Candidate	Robert McLane	Frank Charles Wachter
Party	Democratic	Republican
Popular vote	46,852	46,288
Percentage	50.30%	49.70%
Mayor before election
Thomas Gordon Hayes
Democratic
Elected mayor
Robert McLane
Democratic

The 1903 Baltimore mayoral election saw the election of Robert McLane.

== General election ==
The general election was held May 5.

Baltimore mayoral general election, 1903
Party	Candidate	Votes	%
Democratic	Robert McLane	46,852	50.30%
Republican	Frank Charles Wachter	46,288	49.70%
Total votes		93,140	
