= Samuel Howell Ashbridge =

78th Mayor of Philadelphia (1848–1906)

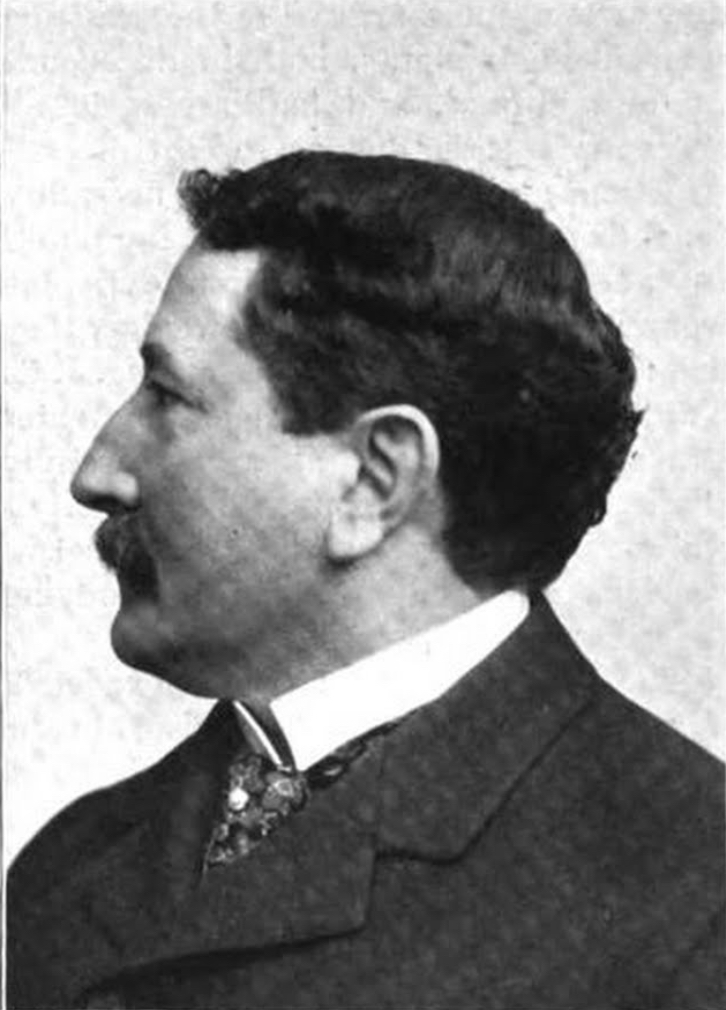

78th Mayor of Philadelphia
- In office April 3, 1899 – April 5, 1903
- Preceded by: Charles F. Warwick
- Succeeded by: John Weaver

Personal details
- Born: December 5, 1848 Philadelphia, Pennsylvania, U.S.
- Died: March 24, 1906 (aged 57) Philadelphia, Pennsylvania, U.S.
- Resting place: West Laurel Hill Cemetery, Bala Cynwyd, Pennsylvania, U.S.
- Party: Republican

Samuel Howell Ashbridge (December 5, 1848 – March 24, 1906) was an American politician who served as mayor of Philadelphia from 1899 to 1903. He was a member of the Pennsylvania Republication political machine and is considered one of the most corrupt mayors in Philadelphia history. His corruption was exposed in The Shame of the Cities, a book by muckraker Lincoln Steffens.

== Early life ==
Ashbridge was born in Philadelphia on December 5, 1848, to a Quaker family. He worked as a clerk for a mercantile business and a coal yard. He later owned his own coal business. In 1893, he became a deputy coroner in Philadelphia and won election as coroner in 1896.

== Career ==
Known as "Stars and Stripes Sam" for his ability to give patriotic speeches, Ashbridge won the 1899 election for mayor, defeating Democrat Horace Hoskins with 145,778 votes, over 84% of the vote, out of 172,940 votes cast. He was closely associated with the political bosses of the Pennsylvania Republican political machine including Matthew Quay, Boies Penrose, and Israel Wilson Durham.

He is considered one of the most corrupt mayors in Philadelphia history. In 1903, Lincoln Steffens in Philadelphia: Corrupt and Contented wrote that Ashbridge had accumulated $40,000 in debt that got satisfied right before the election. Steffens relayed an account of a conversation with former Postmaster General Thomas Hicks in which Ashbridge said:

Tom, I have been elected mayor of Philadelphia. I have four years to serve. I have no further ambitions. I want no other office when I am out of this one, and I shall get out of this office all there is in it for Samuel H. Ashbridge.

In 1901, the Pennsylvania Republican machine pushed bills that would create new streetcar lines in Philadelphia and would ultimately hand the franchises for those lines to his affiliates. Wealthy merchant John Wanamaker offered $2.5 million (according to Steffens; the New York Times reported $5 million) for those rights but Ashbridge threw his offer letter away. and awarded the streetcar rights to a Quay/Durham associate, John Mack. Reportedly, Quay's associates were angry at coverage in the North America, a local newspaper that was owned by Thomas Wanamaker, John's son. The crew attempted to intimidate Wanamaker into stopping attacks on the local machine; their methods included having Wanamaker watched by investigators. Wanamaker, rather than giving in, exposed the tactics and called for an investigation.

Some highlights of Ashbridge's tenure as mayor include proposing what would become Roosevelt Boulevard, and throwing the ceremonial first pitch at the first baseball game played at Columbia Park. Under his administration, a new water filtration system was implemented in Philadelphia to improve the water supply. He also oversaw the Philadelphia Exposition of 1900 and the 1900 Republican National Convention that was held in Philadelphia. After leaving office, he became president of the Tradesmen's Trust Company.

The Philadelphia Municipal League's 1905 report called out corruption from his administration on several fronts. It cited the use of police as a political arm, widespread use of patronage jobs with the city for supporters, election fraud, and "unprecedented" levels of awarding of contracts to politics and personal allies that occurred during the Ashbridge years.

After leaving office, he worked as president of a bank.

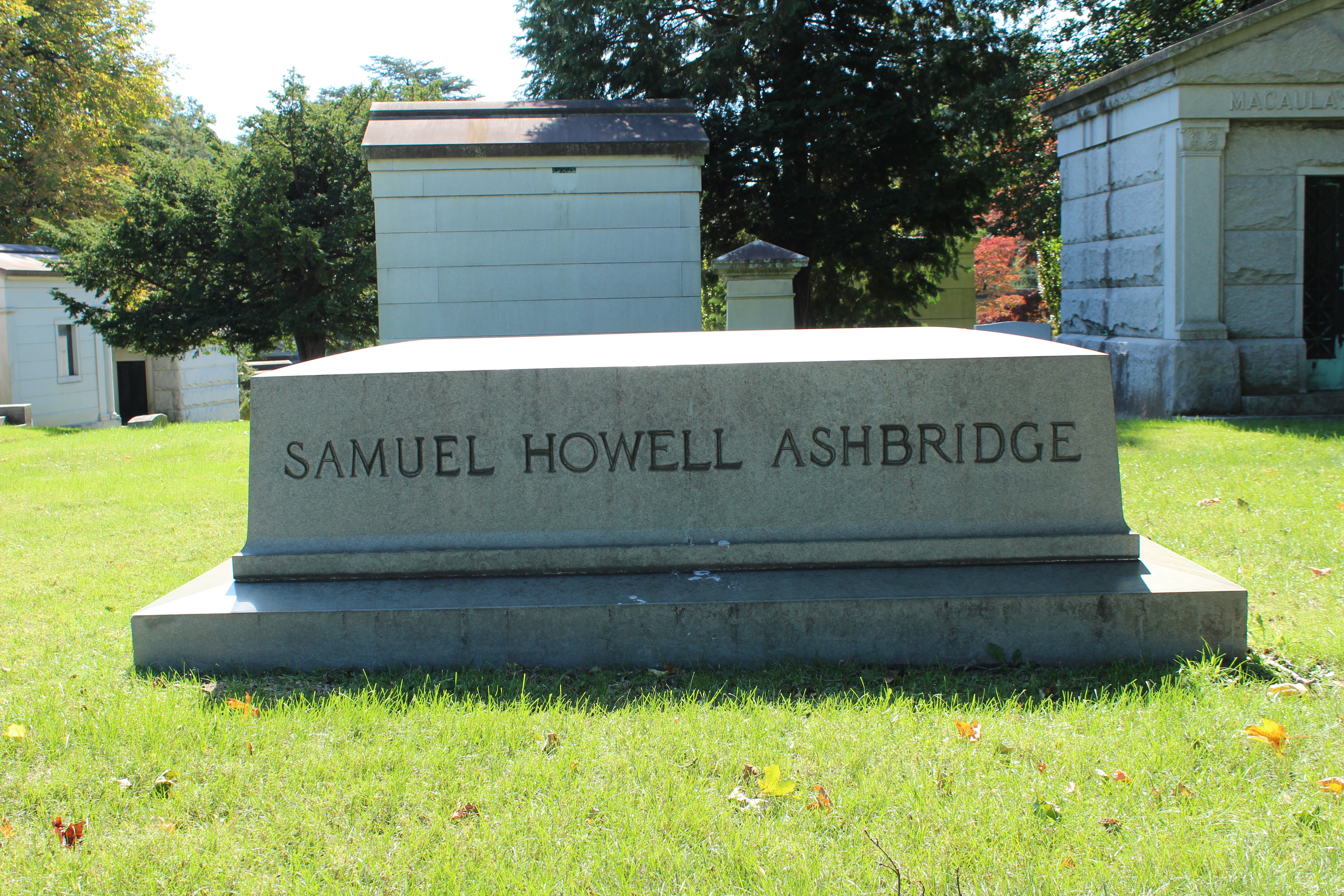
Samuel Howell Ashbridge tombstone in West Laurel Hill Cemetery

He died March 24, 1906, after a long illness at the age of 57. His net worth was an estimated $500,000 at the time of his death. He was interred at West Laurel Hill Cemetery, Ashland Section, Lot 37.

Political offices
Preceded by Charles Franklin Warwick	Mayor of Philadelphia; 1899–1903	Succeeded by John Weaver
