= Francis Fisher Kane =

American lawyer (1866–1955)

Francis Fisher Kane (June 17, 1866 – March 27, 1955) was an American lawyer who served as the U.S. Attorney for the Eastern District of Pennsylvania.

== Family and education ==
Kane was born in Philadelphia in 1866, the son of Robert Patterson Kane and Elizabeth Fisher. He was the cousin of surgeon Evan O'Neill Kane and nephew of Eckley B. Coxe. He was educated at St. Paul's School in Concord. He attended Princeton University, graduating in 1886, before getting a law degree from the University of Pennsylvania Law School.

== Political career ==
From 1896 to 1900, Kane worked as first assistant to U.S. Attorney James M. Beck in Philadelphia. Kane was the Democratic candidate for Mayor of Philadelphia in the 1903 election, but lost to John Weaver. In September 1913, he was appointed by Woodrow Wilson as U.S. Attorney for the Eastern District of Pennsylvania, succeeding John C. Swartley. Kane and his office were active in investigating German-American residents of Philadelphia between 1917 and 1918 for pro-German sympathies.

== Activism ==
Kane resigned from his position in 1920, in protest of the Palmer Raids. Kane sent a letter to A. Mitchell Palmer warning that his actions were "generally unwise and very apt to result in injustice." Two weeks after his resignation, Kane began speaking publicly about his actions in front of groups like the Young Democracy Club and the Philadelphia Club. He was active in the defense of Sacco and Vanzetti in 1927, serving on the Citizens' National Committee for Sacco-Vanzetti. Kane worked with the Voluntary Defenders' Association in the 1930s, an organization that provided legal representation for defendants who were unable to afford an attorney. He received the Philadelphia Award in 1936 because of his work with the Association.
