= 1903 New York City mayoral election =

- November 1903
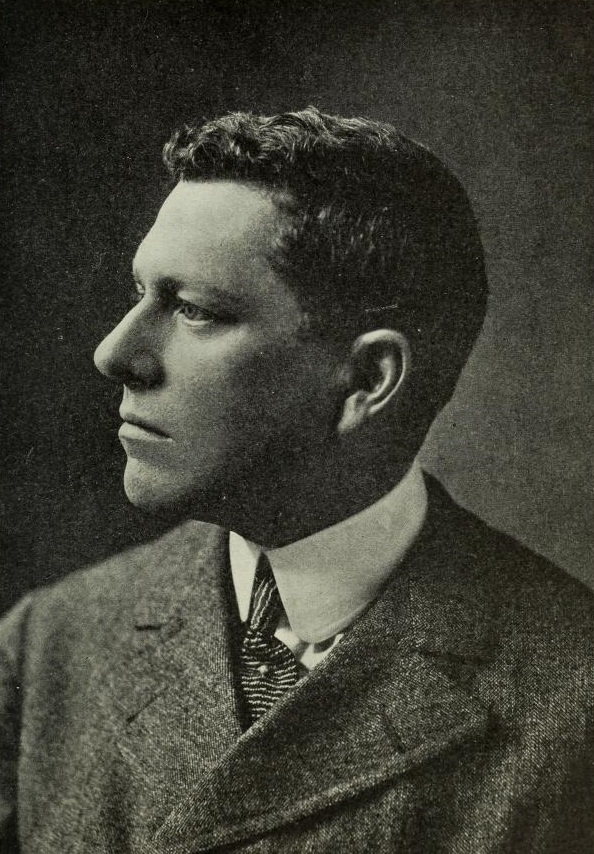

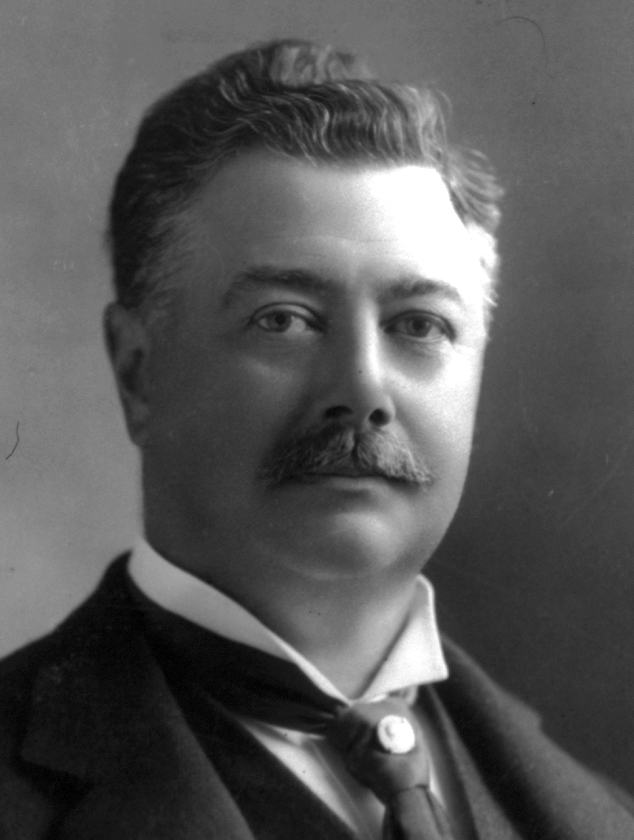
Nominee	George B. McClellan Jr.	Seth Low
Party	Democratic	Republican
Alliance		Fusion
Popular vote	314,782	252,086
Percentage	53.4%	42.7%
- Borough results McClellan: 40–50% 50–60% Low: 40–50%
Mayor before election
Seth Low
Republican
Elected mayor
George B. McClellan Jr.
Democratic

An election for Mayor of New York City was held in November 1903.

Incumbent mayor Seth Low ran for re-election to a second term in office on a fusion ticket but was defeated by Democratic U.S. representative George B. McClellan Jr.

== Democratic nomination ==
=== Candidates ===
- William Jay Gaynor, New York Supreme Court judge from Park Slope, Brooklyn
- George B. McClellan Jr., U.S. representative and son of George B. McClellan

==== Withdrew ====
- Bill Devery, former superintendent and chief of the New York City Police Department

=== Campaign ===
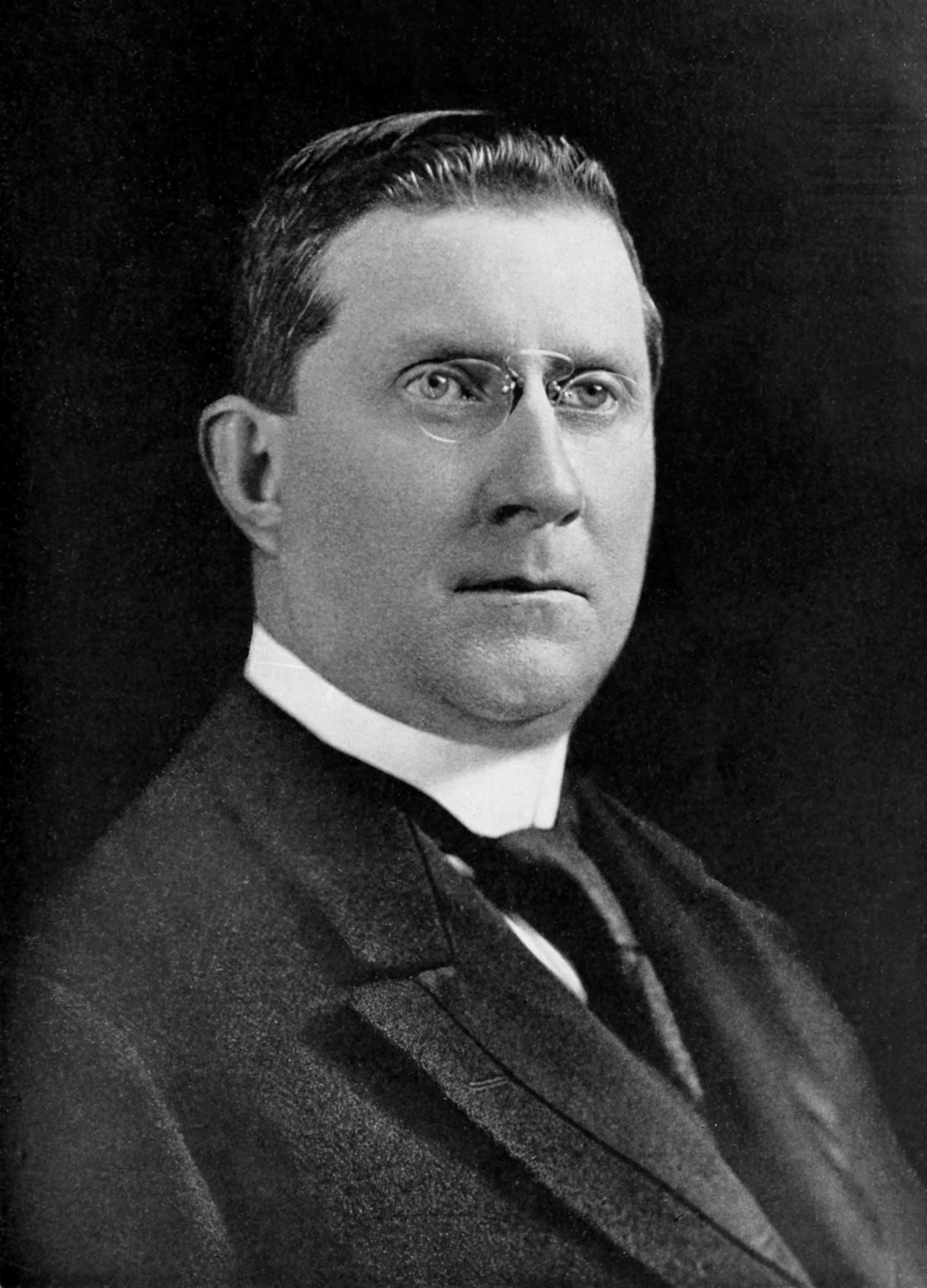
Charles F. Murphy, the new boss of Tammany Hall, engineered McClellan's nomination over objections from the outer boroughs, particularly Brooklyn.

In Manhattan, Charles Francis Murphy had recently replaced Richard Croker as head of the Tammany machine. Murphy, who had become independently wealthy from a trucking company which leased docks from the city and rented them to shipping companies, fixed his goal as Tammany chief to extend Tammany influence to all the boroughs and then beyond. He decided to dislodge Fusionist mayor Seth Low by running George B. McClellan Jr., son of the Civil War general who had run against Lincoln in 1864 and was later elected Governor of New Jersey.

The choice was unpopular in Brooklyn, whose leaders believed that McClellan would hurt down-ticket Brooklyn candidate in races for district attorney, sheriff, and borough and judicial offices. Some observers believed that Murphy intended to alienate the Brooklyn machine, despite the risk of lost votes in Brooklyn, in order to cut off their independent base of patronage. Murphy's highhandedness rankled others as well. At the Democratic City Committee meeting on September 18, party leaders from Queens, the Bronx and Staten Island joined Brooklyn in expressing concern.

Independent Manhattan Democrats also objected to Murphy's action, including the Greater New York Democracy, which endorsed the Fusion ticket, and former Tammany police chief Bill Devery, who decided to run for mayor himself. Even several Tammany chiefs questioned the wisdom of the McClellan choice. Brooklyn party leader Hugh McLaughlin decided to test Murphy's hold over the outer boroughs and gave an interview promising to oppose Murphy's nominee at the city convention.

At the Democratic City Committee meeting on September 24, Murphy defied Brooklyn leaders to take the fight over McClellan to the convention the next week, knowing that Tammany controlled a majority of the delegates. With a view to sowing confusion among the Fusionists, Murphy (without consultation outside of Tammany) proposed adding two Fusion candidates to the ticket: Edward M. Grout for comptroller and Charles V. Fornes for President of the board of aldermen. The proposed nomination of two Fusion candidates by Tammany so disturbed the non-Tammany Democrats that, after much behind-the-scenes scheming, McLaughlin announced a complex plan the day before the convention to either dislodge McClellan from the ticket (and Murphy from Tammany in the process) or provide an anti-Tammany Democratic ticket that would run against him in the general election.

=== Convention ===
The convention was held on October 1, 1903, at Carnegie Hall. At first, it looked as if the Kings County delegation, which nominated William Jay Gaynor for mayor, could engineer a stampede against the Tammany ticket. Brooklyn Assistant District Attorney Martin W. Littleton led the charge, looking directly at Murphy and delivering a blistering speech scoring Tammany "treachery" for selecting Democratic "traitor" Grout. Robert H. Elder followed him, nominating Julian D. Fairchild in Grout's place and reminding the convention that Grout had been a Republican who left the Brooklyn Democrats because of their association with Tammany.

Littleton rose again to remind the delegates that Grout once called Tammany a "stench in his nostrils." The "excitement reached a climax" when one Tammany leader broke with Murphy against Grout, causing "wild applause." Murphy and the Tammany leaders sat through the abuse, smiling, and despite the demonstration, the Brooklyn delegates were routed by a near unanimous vote for the Tammany ticket. While the Kings County delegation under the leadership of state senator Patrick H. McCarren made show of unity by moving the unanimous nomination of McClellan, a similar motion for Grout and Fornes was "howled down."

=== Aftermath ===
The next day at the Brooklyn Democratic headquarters in the auction room on Willoughby Street, all talk of McLaughlin's plan for an opposition ticket to Tammany's had ceased. If McClellan won the mayoralty, all Brooklyn patronage would go through him and Tammany. While Brooklyn maintained its objection to Grout and Fornes, that did little good for the Brooklyn party unless McClellan lost, and McCarren and the rest at the Convention eventually endorsed McClellan. As one Democrat put it, "Tammany's coming to Brooklyn sure and [McLaughlin] will take his medicine." McCarren used the occasion to take over the Brooklyn organization, unseating McLaughlin as boss.

== General election ==
=== Candidates ===
- Charles Forman (Social Democratic)
- James T. Hunter, silversmith (Socialist Labor)
- Seth Low, incumbent mayor since 1902 (Republican-Fusion)
- George B. McClellan Jr., U.S. representative (Democratic)
- John McKee (Prohibition)

==== Results ====
New York City mayoral election, 1903
Party	Candidate	Votes	%
Democratic	George B. McClellan Jr.	314,782	53.4%
Republican	Seth Low (incumbent)	252,086	42.7%
Social Democratic	Charles Forman	16,956	2.9%
Socialist Labor	James T. Hunter	5,205	0.9%
Prohibition	John McKee	869	0.1%
Total votes		589,898	100.00
Democratic gain from Republican			

==== Results by borough ====
1903	Party	The Bronx and Manhattan	Brooklyn	Queens	Richmond [Staten Is.]	Total	%
George B. McClellan Jr.	Democratic	188,681	102,569	17,074	6,458	314,782	53.4%
George B. McClellan Jr.	Democratic	56.1%	48.8%	56.5%	48.1%	314,782	53.4%
Seth Low	Fusion	132,178	101,251	11,960	6,697	252,086	42.7%
Seth Low	Fusion	39.3%	48.2%	39.6%	49.9%	252,086	42.7%
Charles Forman	Social Democratic	11,318	4,529	976	133	16,956	2.9%
James T. Hunter	Socialist Labor	3,540	1,411	178	76	5,205	0.9%
John McKee	Prohibition	376	396	47	50	869	0.1%
TOTAL		336,093	210,156	30,235	13,414	589,898

== Sources ==
- Carmer, Carl (1948). "From Van Wyck to O'Dwyer". In Nevins, Allan; Krout, John A. (eds.). The Greater City: New York, 1898-1948. New York: Columbia University Press. LCCN 48008678.
