= P. Frederick Rothermel =

American lawyer

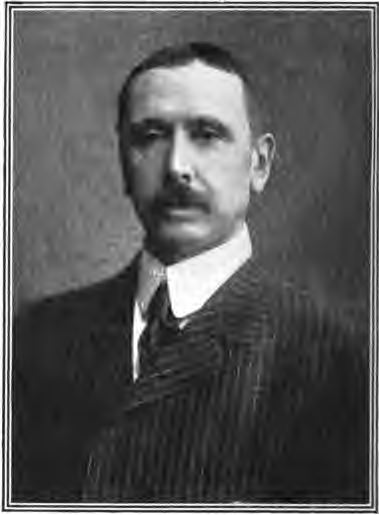
P. Frederick Rothermel in 1901

Peter Frederick Rothermel, Jr. (September 27, 1850 – May 26, 1929) was a Pennsylvania lawyer and politician. Rothermel was born in Philadelphia, the son of Peter F. Rothermel, a successful artist, and his wife, Caroline Goodhart. After attending various schools in Europe while his father was employed there, Rothermel graduated from Central High School in Philadelphia in 1867. Following his graduation, Rothermel clerked in the law office of James T. Mitchell, a prominent Philadelphia attorney who would later serve on the Supreme Court of Pennsylvania.

== Legal career and family ==
Rothermel was admitted to the bar in 1871. For the next fifteen years, he found successful employment as a corporate attorney in Philadelphia representing many of that city's corporate titans, including John Wanamaker. In 1881, Rothermel married Josephine Bryant, the daughter of Walter Bryant, a coal baron and sister of Henry Grier Bryant, the explorer. The couple had one son, Peter F. Rothermel, III, born in 1883.

== Political career ==
In 1884, Rothermel considered an attempt at election to City Solicitor, but later withdrew his candidacy. In 1898, Rothermel ran for District Attorney of Philadelphia as a Republican and was elected, defeating James M. Beck. The following year, Rothermel served as prosecutor in the corruption trial of Senator Matthew Quay. Quay was found innocent after an eleven-day trial.

After his term as District Attorney ended in 1901, Rothermel was refused renomination by the Republican machine politicians, owing to his prosecution of Quay. He was nominated by a group of reformers on a fusion ticket, but failed to be re-elected, losing to future mayor John Weaver. Following his defeat, Rothermel resumed his successful corporate practice. He died on May 26, 1919, at his home on Rittenhouse Square.
