= 1903 Cape Colony parliamentary election =

Elections for the Legislative Council were held in Cape Colony in 1903. Following Act 4 in 1904, a further three seats were added to the Council, for which elections were held in the same year.

Thirty-two candidates contested the 26 seats, although the three seats in the North Eastern Province, as well as the single seats for Griqualand West and British Bechauanaland were uncontested as only one candidate ran for east seat. A total of 135,177 voters were registered for the election.

== Statistics ==
Electoral district	Seats	Candidates	Registered voters	Votes available	Votes cast
British Bechuanaland	1	1	1,702	1,702	–
Eastern	4	5	20,516	82,064	43,753
Griqualand West	1	1	8,357	8,357	–
Midland	3	4	9,826	29,478	17,727
North-Eastern	3	3	11,753	35,259	–
North-Western	3	4	11,384	34,152	24,595
South-Eastern	4	5	22,015	88,060	45,551
South-Western	3	4	14,444	43,332	29,667
Western	4	5	35,180	140,720	63,111
Total	26	32	135,177	463,124	224,224
Source: Statistical register of the colony of the Cape of Good Hope
