= 1903 Swiss referendums =

Four referendums were held in Switzerland during 1903. The first was held on 15 March on a federal law on tariffs, and was approved by 59.6% of voters. The second, third and fourth were all held on 25 October concerning an amendment to the federal criminal law, a popular initiative on Swiss residents electing the National Council and an amendment to article 32bis of the constitution. All three were rejected by voters.

== Background ==
The referendums on tariffs and the federal criminal law were optional referendums, which required only a majority of the public vote. The referendum on the changes to National Council elections was popular initiative and the referendum on the constitutional amendment was a mandatory referendum, both of which required a double majority; a majority of the popular vote and majority of the cantons. The decision of each canton was based on the vote in that canton. Full cantons counted as one vote, whilst half cantons counted as half.

== Results ==
=== Tariffs ===
Choice	Votes	%
For	332,001	59.6
Against	225,123	40.4
Blank votes	3,529	–
Invalid votes	2,216	–
Total	562,869	100
Registered voters/turnout	768,125	73.3
Source: Nohlen & Stöver

=== Criminal law ===
Choice	Votes	%
For	117,694	30.8
Against	264,085	69.2
Blank votes	15,099	–
Invalid votes	12,007	–
Total	408,885	100
Registered voters/turnout	768,105	53.2
Source: Nohlen & Stöver

=== National Council elections ===
Choice	Popular vote		Cantons		
Choice	Votes	%	Full	Half	Total
For	95,131	24.4	3	2	4
Against	295,085	75.6	16	4	18
Blank votes	13,460	–	–	–	–
Invalid votes	5,363	–	–	–	–
Total	409,039	100	19	6	22
Registered voters/turnout	768,105	53.3	–	–	–
Source: Nohlen & Stöver

=== Amendment of article 32bis of the constitution ===
Choice	Popular vote		Cantons		
Choice	Votes	%	Full	Half	Total
For	156,777	40.7	4	0	4
Against	228,094	59.3	15	6	18
Blank votes	14,674	–	–	–	–
Invalid votes	8,307	–	–	–	–
Total	407,852	100	19	6	22
Registered voters/turnout	768,105	53.1	–	–	–
Source: Nohlen & Stöver
