= Edwin Sydney Stuart =

American politician

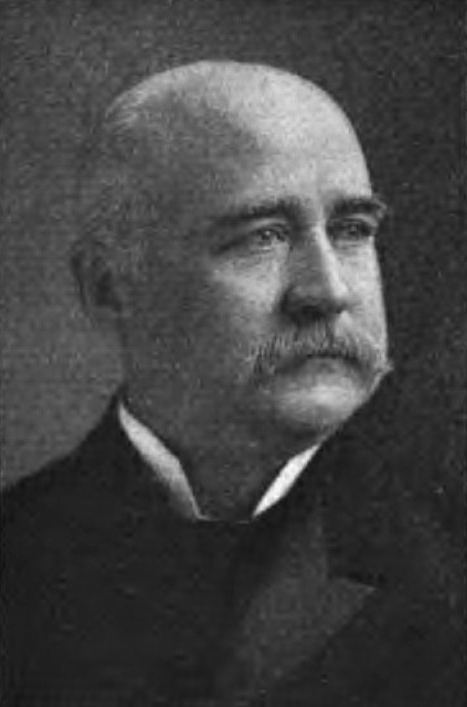
- Edwin S. Stuart circa 1909

24th Governor of Pennsylvania
- In office January 15, 1907 – January 17, 1911
- Lieutenant: Robert Murphy
- Preceded by: Samuel Pennypacker
- Succeeded by: John Tener

76th Mayor of Philadelphia
- In office January 5, 1891 – January 7, 1895
- Preceded by: Edwin Fitler
- Succeeded by: Charles Warwick

Personal details
- Born: December 28, 1853 Philadelphia, Pennsylvania
- Died: March 21, 1937 (aged 83)
- Party: Republican
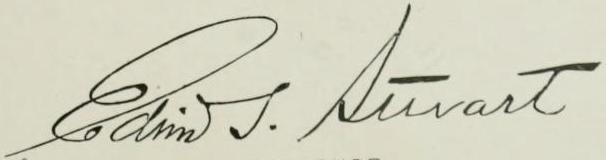
- Signature

Edwin Sydney Stuart (December 28, 1853 – March 21, 1937) was an American politician who served as the Mayor of Philadelphia from 1891 to 1895 and as the 24th governor of Pennsylvania from 1907 to 1911.

== Early life and Philadelphia politics ==
Stuart was born in Philadelphia in 1853. At age 13, he ended his formal schooling and took a job as a bookkeeper for the book wholesaler W.A. Leary. He rose to attain a controlling interest in the company. By 1882, Stuart had become president of the state Republican Party. In 1886, he won a seat on Philadelphia City Council.

In 1891, Stuart successfully ran for Mayor of Philadelphia. He quickly gained a reputation as a no-nonsense official who would take a hardline approach against corruption. He uncovered impropriety within the city treasurer's office, resulting in the arrest of City Treasurer John Bardsley, and a complete overhaul in budgetary control procedures. He also fired the public safety director for accepting bribes and won a hard-fought battle with the private streetcar lines that forced these entities to help defray the cost of street paving. Upon completion of his mayoral term in 1896, he won an election to return to city council.

== Governor of Pennsylvania ==
Stuart was known as The Governor Who Cares following his investigation of scandals involving the building of the Pennsylvania capitol. The investigation resulted in the prosecution and conviction of four individuals. At that time, the Governor became known as a sharp-eyed overseer of the public good, and had a habit of involving himself in the operations of many state agencies. His reforms included concentrating power in the executive office and abolishing a number of redundant state boards and commissions, replacing them with a single official who was held responsible for results. The Philadelphia Bulletin supported the Governor's reform efforts stating,

There has probably never been a governor of Pennsylvania who has employed the veto power so extensively in dealing with the bills of a single legislative session as Governor Stuart has in the past thirty days. He has prevented scores of crude, ill-considered ... bills from becoming laws and he has reduced the improvident appropriation to the extent of more than twenty million dollars.

In the midst of all the vetoing it has been difficult for any one to challenge the justice of the governor's judgement. Every veto has rested on a sound reason in the public interest.

Among the bills he vetoed was one for the building of a statewide system of state roads, a cause he supported but chose to sacrifice for fiscal prudence and accountability. Stuart was, however, able to achieve several of his central legislative priorities. He secured labor laws that restricted children under age 14 from working in heavy industry. He also improved oversight of the healthcare field and authorized the construction of the Mont Alto Sanitorium to treat tuberculous patients.

Stuart Hall on the campus of Penn State University is named in honor of Governor Stuart.

He is buried at West Laurel Hill Cemetery, Bala Cynwyd, Pennsylvania.

== Legacy ==
In 1893 Philadelphia launched a fireboat named after Stuart.

Political offices
Preceded by Edwin Fitler	Mayor of Philadelphia, Pennsylvania; 1891–1895	Succeeded by Charles Warwick
Preceded by Samuel Pennypacker	Governor of Pennsylvania; 1907–1911	Succeeded by John Tener
Party political offices
Preceded by Samuel Pennypacker	Republican nominee for Governor of Pennsylvania; 1906	Succeeded by John Tener
