= John Weaver (mayor) =

American politician

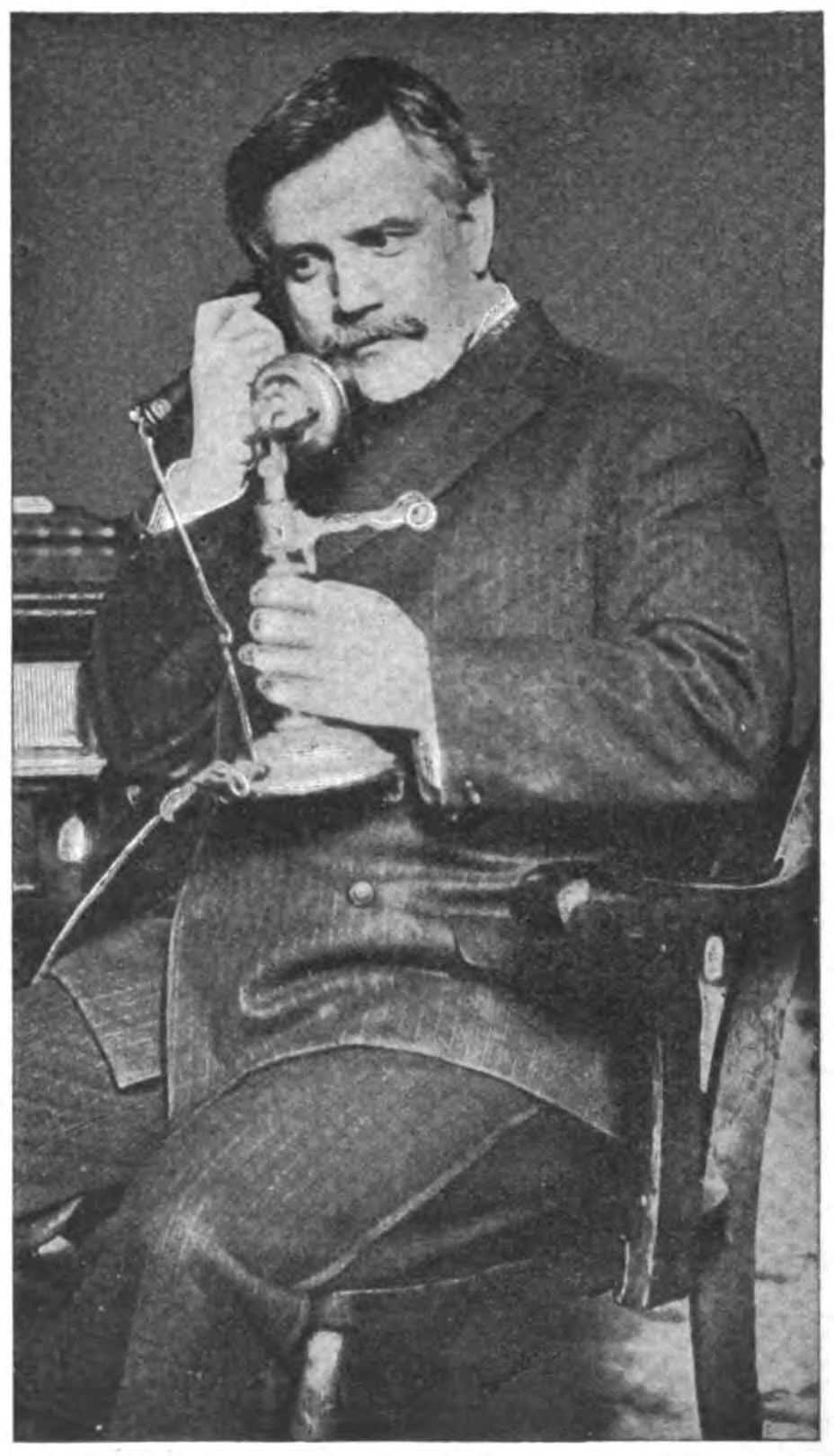

Mayor of Philadelphia
- In office April 5, 1903 – April 1, 1907
- Preceded by: Samuel Howell Ashbridge
- Succeeded by: John E. Reyburn

Personal details
- Born: October 5, 1861 Stourport-on-Severn, England
- Died: March 18, 1928 (aged 66)
- Party: Republican

John Weaver (October 5, 1861 – March 18, 1928) was an American lawyer and politician who served as a Republican mayor of Philadelphia from 1903 to 1907.

== Early life and career ==
John Weaver was born in Stourport-on-Severn, England in 1861, the son of Benjamin Weaver and Elizabeth Wilks Weaver. After his mother died in 1874, Weaver found his prospects in England to be dim, and emigrated to the United States in 1881. On arriving there, he went to work as a messenger boy and later as a clerk at John Wanamaker's department store in Philadelphia. He became a naturalized American citizen in 1889. In 1885, he married Emily Jennings, the sister of his co-worker, William Nicholson Jennings. He became a member of Russell Conwell's Temple Baptist Church in the city's Tioga section, where he taught Sunday school.

Weaver studied shorthand at night and became a stenographer for a local attorney, John Sparhawk. Sparhawk encouraged him to study law, and he did so, being admitted to the bar in 1890. When Sparhawk's health began to fail, Weaver took over much of his practice, and soon became a respected local attorney. Weaver's success drew the attention of Philadelphia's Republican political machine, which was then the dominant political force in the city. When the ring's leader perceived that District Attorney P. Frederick Rothermel was becoming too independent, they nominated Weaver, a political unknown, instead. Rothermel ran against Weaver as an independent, but Weaver defeated him by a substantial margin.

As district attorney, Weaver showed signs of the same independence that imperiled Rothermel's position with the party, including initiating prosecution for voter fraud against a local politician. Despite this, the ring deemed Weaver reliable enough to nominate him for mayor in 1903, his independence being thought to be an advantage in blunting the arguments of the growing reform movement in the city. Weaver was elected by a large majority over Francis Fisher Kane, the Democrats' nominee.

== Mayor ==
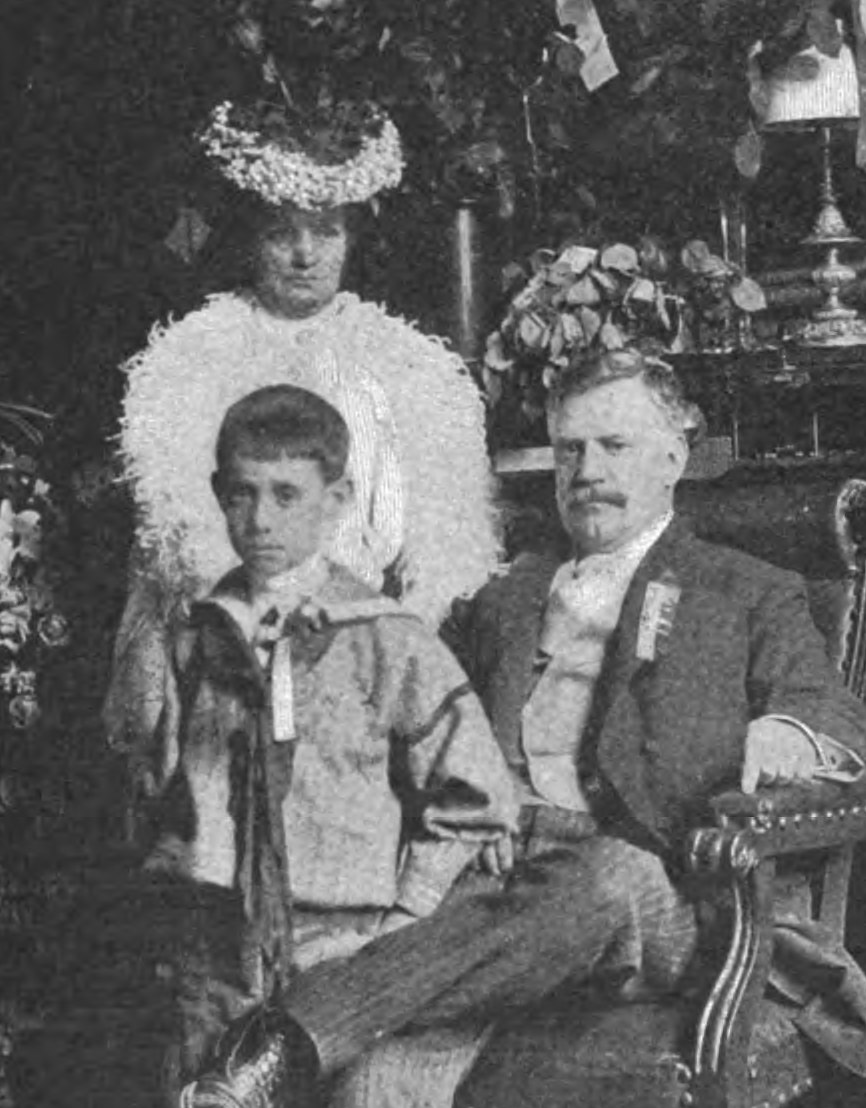
Weaver with wife Emily and son John

Weaver began his term as mayor without controversy, routinely awarding city contracts to members of the political establishment, as his political patrons expected. His first conflict with the machine came in 1905, when the City Councils passed a bill to lease the city's natural gas works to the United Gas Improvement Company for seventy-five years. The company was controlled by members of the Republican establishment, and the no-bid long-term lease was suspected by reformers as a way to keep gas prices high and insure profit for connected industrialists. Weaver got word of the bill when he was fishing in Canada. The proposed sale had by that time caused widespread outrage among the Philadelphians, and Weaver wrote a letter promising to veto the measure when he returned.

After vetoing the bill, Weaver removed two ring men who had helped facilitate the proposed sale, the Director of Public Works, Peter E. Costello, and the Director of Public Safety, David J. Smyth. This attack on the ring turned them forcefully against Weaver, who was quickly embraced by the reformers. Weaver, term-limited, left office in 1907. He returned to his private law practice, working in that field until his death in 1928. He was buried in Mount Peace Cemetery in Philadelphia.

== Sources ==
- "Death Certificate". Ancestry.com. March 22, 1928.
- "Passport Application". Ancestry.com. June 6, 1922.
- "Result in Pennsylvania" (PDF). The New York Times. November 7, 1901.
- "For Philadelphia's Mayor" (PDF). The New York Times. December 28, 1902.
- "Philadelphia's New Mayor" (PDF). The New York Times. February 18, 1903.
- "Ex-Mayor Weaver of Philadelphia Dead". The New York Times. March 19, 1928.
- Allen, Philip Loring (1906). America's Awakening: The Triumph of Righteousness in High Places. New York, New York: Fleming H. Revell Company. OCLC 3353081.
- Silcox, Harry C. (1993). Jennings' Philadelphia: The Life of Philadelphia Photographer William Nicholson Jennings (1860–1946). Holland, Pennsylvania: Brighton Press. OCLC 29150597.
- Stewart, William R. (October 1905). "The Real John Weaver". Cosmopolitan. 39 (6): 601–606.

Legal offices
Preceded by P. Frederick Rothermel	District Attorney of Philadelphia; 1902–1903	Succeeded by John C. Bell
Political offices
Preceded by Samuel Howell Ashbridge	Mayor of Philadelphia; 1903–1907	Succeeded by John E. Reyburn
