= Ella Winter =

American Journalist

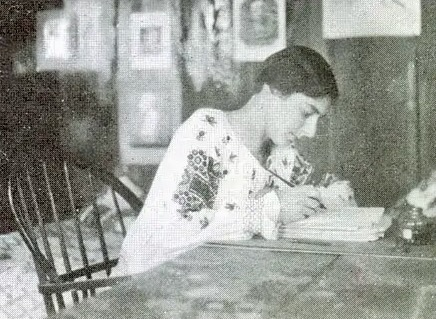
- Winter in her study in Carmel-by-the-Sea
- Born: Eleanora Sophie Wertheimer; 17 March 1898; Nuremberg, Germany
- Died: 5 August 1980 (aged 82); Hampstead, London
- Occupations: Journalist and activist
- Spouses: Lincoln Steffens (m. 1924; div. 1929) Donald Ogden Stewart (m. 1939)
- Children: 1

Ella Winter Stewart (17 March 1898 – 5 August 1980) was an Australian-British journalist and activist, and champion of migrant farm workers. She was married first to investigative journalist Lincoln Steffens and then to Hollywood screenwriter Donald Ogden Stewart.

== Early life ==
Ella was born Leonore Sophie Wertheimer in Melbourne (Caulfield) on 17 March 1898. Her parents were Freda Lust and Adolph Wertheimer of Nürnberg, who lived in London, Melbourne, Australia, and again in London, when they changed their name to Winter (around 1910). She was the double first cousin of the psychiatrists Fredric Wertham and Ida Macalpine and first cousin once removed of the humanitarian Nicholas Winton. Ella studied at the London School of Economics in England.

== Career ==
Ella met the U.S. journalist and muckraker Lincoln Steffens at the Versailles Conference, where she was secretary to US Supreme Court Justice Felix Frankfurter. She was greatly influenced by Steffens in her political views, which moved from liberalism and moderate, Fabian socialism to more radical socialism and communism. Winter and Steffens married in 1924, after she had become pregnant from him. Ella was a New Woman and the two had agreed in advance that they would divorce five years later so that she could have her freedom and he would be spared "the anxiety and embarrassment of a wandering wife". They moved to Italy, where their son, Peter, was born in San Remo. Two years later, they moved to the largest art colony on the Pacific Coast, Carmel-by-the-Sea, California. Where their social circle included photographer Edward Weston, poet Robinson Jeffers, philosopher/mythologist Joseph Campbell, nutritionist/author Adelle Davis, short story writer/poet Clark Ashton Smith, marine biologist/ecologist Ed Ricketts, Nobel prize winner Sinclair Lewis, and novelists John Steinbeck and Henry Miller.

When two Carmel reactionaries, artist William Silva and writer/editor Perry Newberry, tried to ban her local chapter of the communist-affiliated John Reed Club as well as her "socialist reading room", the press as far away as Los Angeles reported on the violation of her civil rights. The Steffens's also joined controversial national campaigns, including the Scottsboro Boys Defense Fund which sought to free nine black men who were still incarcerated after the Supreme Court of the United States twice reversed their convictions for rape.

Ella divorced Steffens on 21 June 1929, as they had agreed. However, the two continued to live together until Steffens' death. Lincoln Steffens died on August 9, 1936, of a heart condition in Carmel.

== The Carmelite ==
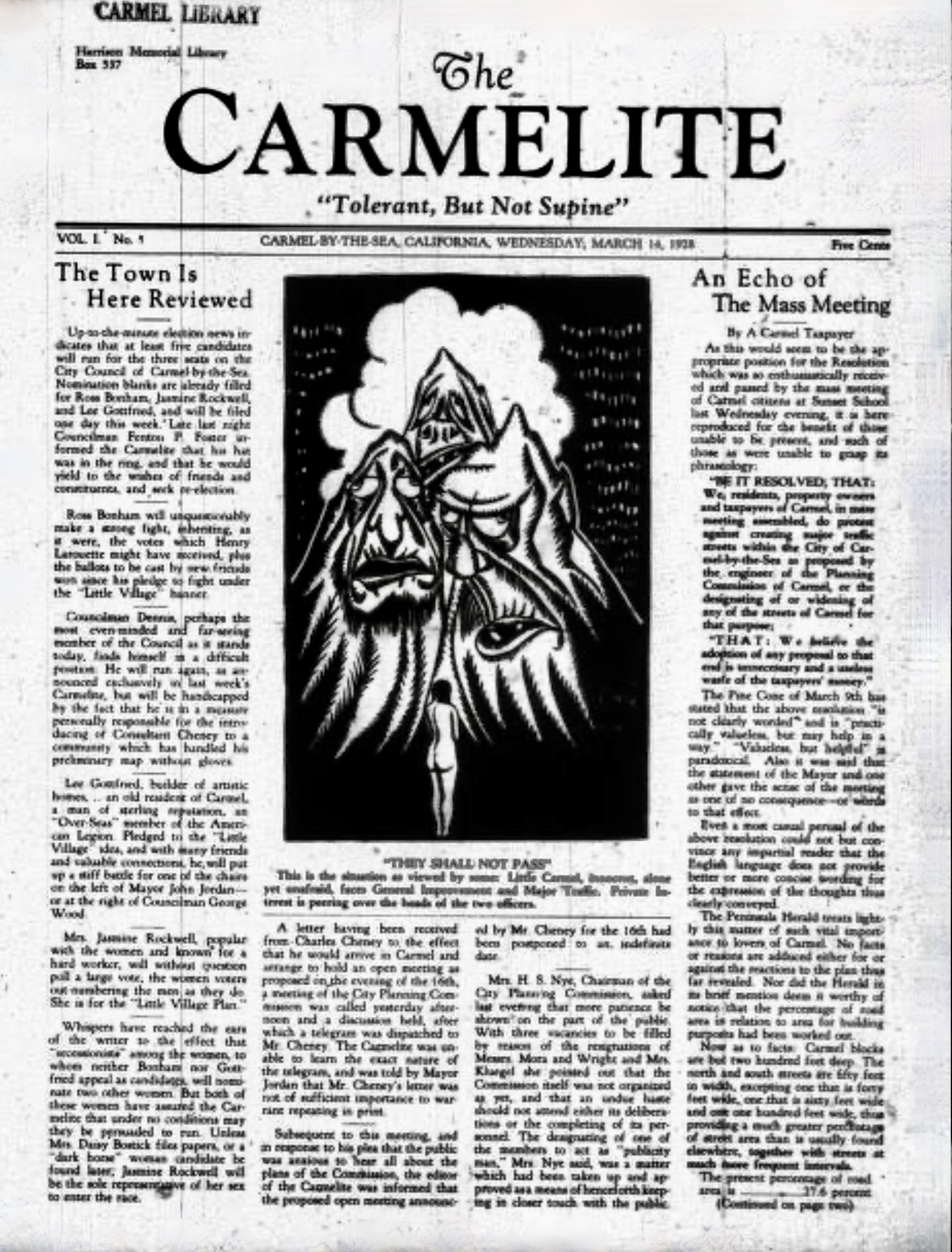
The Carmelite (1928)

The Carmelite, a weekly newspaper, was published in Carmel-by-the-Sea from 1928 to 1932. Its inception was fueled by the desire to provide an alternative to the town's conventional publication, the Carmel Pine Cone. Spearheaded by Ella Winter and Steffens in 1928, The Carmelite swiftly gained recognition for its unique perspective on art, establishing itself as one of California's most contentious periodicals. Within its pages, Ella fearlessly explored an array of subjects, captivating readers with her diverse writings.

The Carmel Colony was sharply divided between conservative and liberal factions; the latter quickly coalesced around the Steffenses, who publicly debated the most controversial topics. The Irish poet and folklorist Ella Young, as well as the local press, described the relaxed social intercourse in this counterculture world.

With contributions by numerous leftist literati, including Jeffers, Martin Flavin, Lewis and the Steffenses, along with theater, dance and art reviews by feminist artists such as Alberta Spratt, Jennie V. Cannon, and Roberta Balfour, The Carmelite became one of California’s most controversial publications.

Pauline Gibling Schindler, an educator, editor, and advocate of the arts, took on the role of editor at The Carmelite. During her tenure, tensions arose between her and fellow editor Steffens, leading to clashes behind the scenes.

Its illustrations ranged from Weston’s enigmatic photos to the "anarchist" prints of James Blanding Sloan. The Steffenses also arranged for public exhibits of Europe’s most avant-garde art, including Dada, Surrealism and the paintings of Paul Klee. Ella wrote on various topics and once reported on the very unusual meeting between the popular Modernist artists John O’Shea and Frederick O’Brien. The Steffens' support of the art community extended to their own home where they entertained local painters and offered to display their work.

== Publications ==
A close associate with the Communist Party USA and strong supporter of the Soviet Union under Stalin, she wrote her first book, Red Virtue, after visiting the Soviet Union in 1932.

She returned to the Soviet Union in 1944 and published I Saw the Russian People the following year. In her autobiography, And Not to Yield published in 1963, she affirmed her support for the Soviets while admitting that she had concealed negative aspects of the regime. At the time, she told a friend that she was not part of the "'God that failed' brigade and did not want her book to be of advantage to that group".

In 1939, Ella married the screenwriter and humorist Donald Ogden Stewart and became stepmother to his sons, Donald and Ames. They lived in California and then in Hampstead, London.

In conversation with Thomas Wolfe, Winter once said: "Don't you know you can't go home again?" Wolfe then asked Winter for permission to use the phrase as the title of his book You Can't Go Home Again.

== Death ==
Ella died of a stroke on 5 August 1980 at her home in Hampstead, London. She was 82 years old.

== Bibliography ==
- Red Virtue: Human Relations in the New Russia. Harcourt, Brace & Company, New York 1933
- Ella Winter, Granville Hicks (eds.): The Letters of Lincoln Steffens. Harcourt, Brace & Company, New York 1938
- I Saw the Russian People. Little, Brown and Company, Boston 1945
- Ella Winter, Herbert Shapiro (eds.): The World of Lincoln Steffens. 1962
- And Not to Yield: An Autobiography. Harcourt, Brace & World, New York 1963
