= Muckscape =

Muckscape can refer to:

== noun ==
- A media environment consisting mainly of exaggerated or falsified journalistic claims.
- Not to be confused with the Muckrakers of the early twentieth century whose journalistic integrity led to the reformation of corrupt government and private industries, the modern day Muckscape is dominated by lazy, biased, or unqualified T.V./radio/internet news personalities masquerading as journalists. (See Glenn Beck).
- The state of much modern televised/radio/internet news.

== verb ==
- To cultivate an unsubstantiated or blatantly false media environment.
