= Lincoln Steffens =

American investigative journalist (1866–1936)

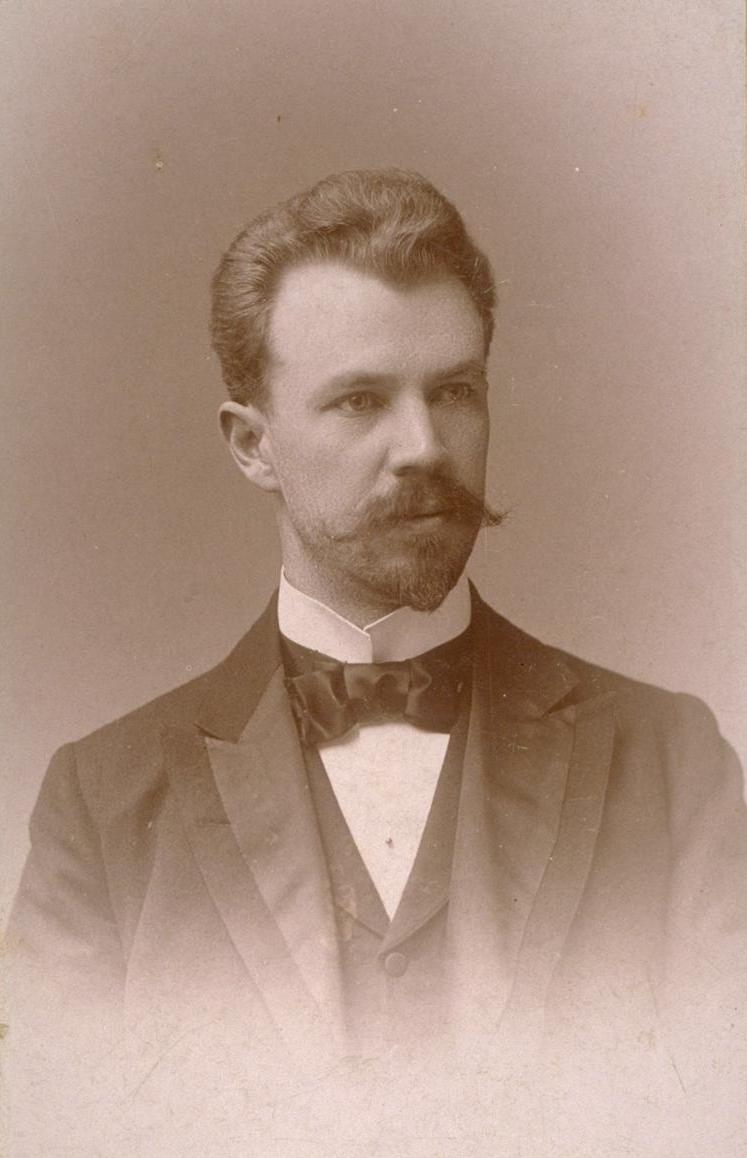
- Steffens in 1895
- Born: Joseph Lincoln Steffens; April 6, 1866; San Francisco, California, US
- Died: August 9, 1936 (aged 70); Carmel-by-the-Sea, California, US
- Resting place: Cypress Lawn Memorial Park
- Education: University of California, Berkeley
- Occupation: Journalist
- Employers: New York Evening Post (until 1905); McClure's Magazine (until 1906); The American Magazine (1906 onward)
- Known for: Muckraking; Articles and books, including The Shame of the Cities
- Spouse(s): Josephine Bontecou (m. 1881–1911), Ella Winter (m. 1924)
- Children: 1
- Relatives: Laura Steffens Suggett (sister)

Joseph Lincoln Steffens (April 6, 1866 – August 9, 1936) was an American investigative journalist and one of the leading muckrakers of the Progressive Era in the early 20th century. He launched a series of articles in McClure's, called "Tweed Days in St. Louis", that would later be published together in a book titled The Shame of the Cities. He is remembered for investigating corruption in municipal government in American cities and for his balanced views.

== Early life ==
Steffens was born in San Francisco, California, the only son and eldest of four children of Elizabeth Louisa (Symes) Steffens and Joseph Steffens. He was raised largely in Sacramento, the state capital; the Steffens family mansion, a Victorian house on H Street bought from merchant Albert Gallatin in 1887, would become the California Governor's Mansion in 1903.

Steffens attended St Mathews, where he frequently clashed with the school's founder and director, stern disciplinarian, Alfred Lee Brewer.

== Career ==
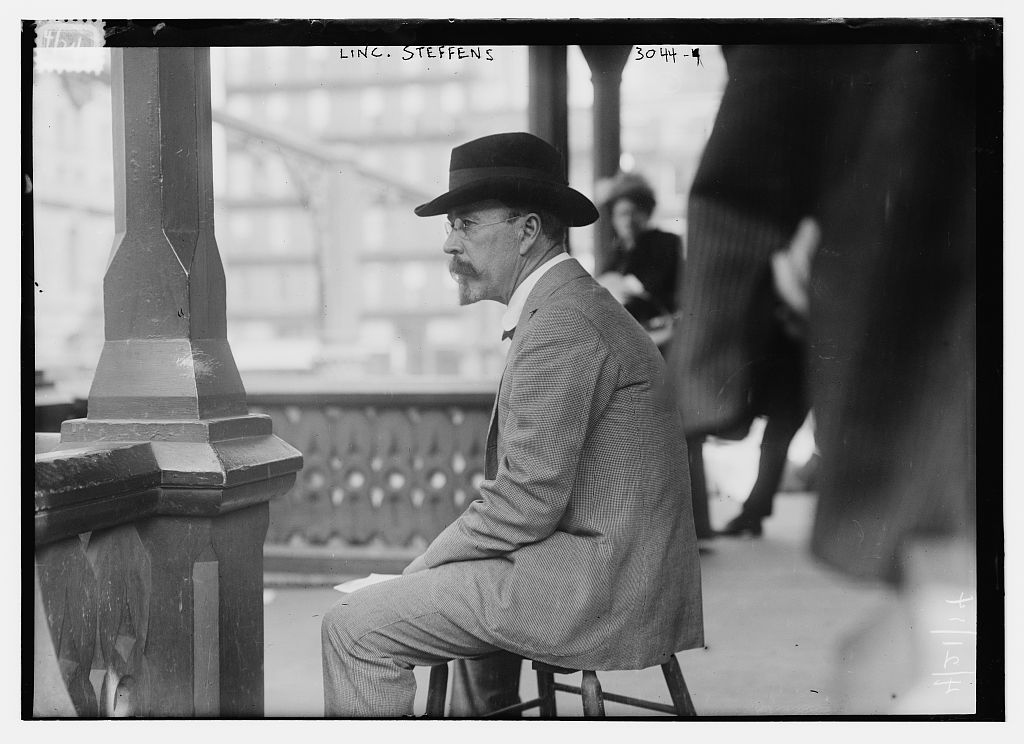
Steffens in 1914

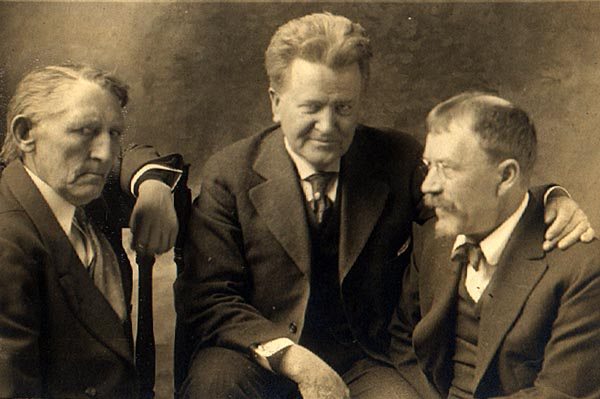
Steffens (right), Senator La Follette (center), and maritime labor leader Andrew Furuseth (left), c. 1915

Steffens began his journalism career at the New York Commercial Advertiser in the 1890s, before moving to the New York Evening Post. From 1902 to 1906, he became an editor of McClure's magazine, where he became part of a celebrated muckraking trio with Ida Tarbell and Ray Stannard Baker. He specialized in investigating government and political corruption, and two collections of his articles were published as The Shame of the Cities (1904) and The Struggle for Self-Government (1906). He also wrote The Traitor State (1905), which criticized New Jersey for patronizing incorporation. In 1906, he left McClure's, along with Tarbell and Baker, to form The American Magazine. In The Shame of the Cities, Steffens sought to bring about political reform in urban America by appealing to the emotions of Americans. He tried to provoke outrage with examples of corrupt governments throughout urban America.

From 1914 to 1915, he covered the Mexican Revolution and began to see revolution as preferable to reform. In March 1919, he accompanied William C. Bullitt, a low-level State Department official, on a three-week visit to Soviet Russia and witnessed the "confusing and difficult" process of society in the process of revolutionary change. He wrote that "Soviet Russia was a revolutionary government with an evolutionary plan", enduring "a temporary condition of evil, which is made tolerable by hope and a plan."

After his return, he promoted his view of the Soviet Revolution and in the course of campaigning for U.S. food aid for Russia made his famous remark about the new Soviet society: "I have seen the future, and it works", a phrase he often repeated with many variations. The title page of his wife Ella Winter's Red Virtue: Human Relationships in the New Russia (Victor Gollancz, 1933) carries this quote.

His enthusiasm for communism soured by the time his memoirs appeared in 1931. The autobiography became a bestseller leading to a short return to prominence for the writer, but Steffens would not be able to capitalize on it as illness cut his lecture tour of America short by 1933. He was a member of the California Writers Project, a New Deal program.

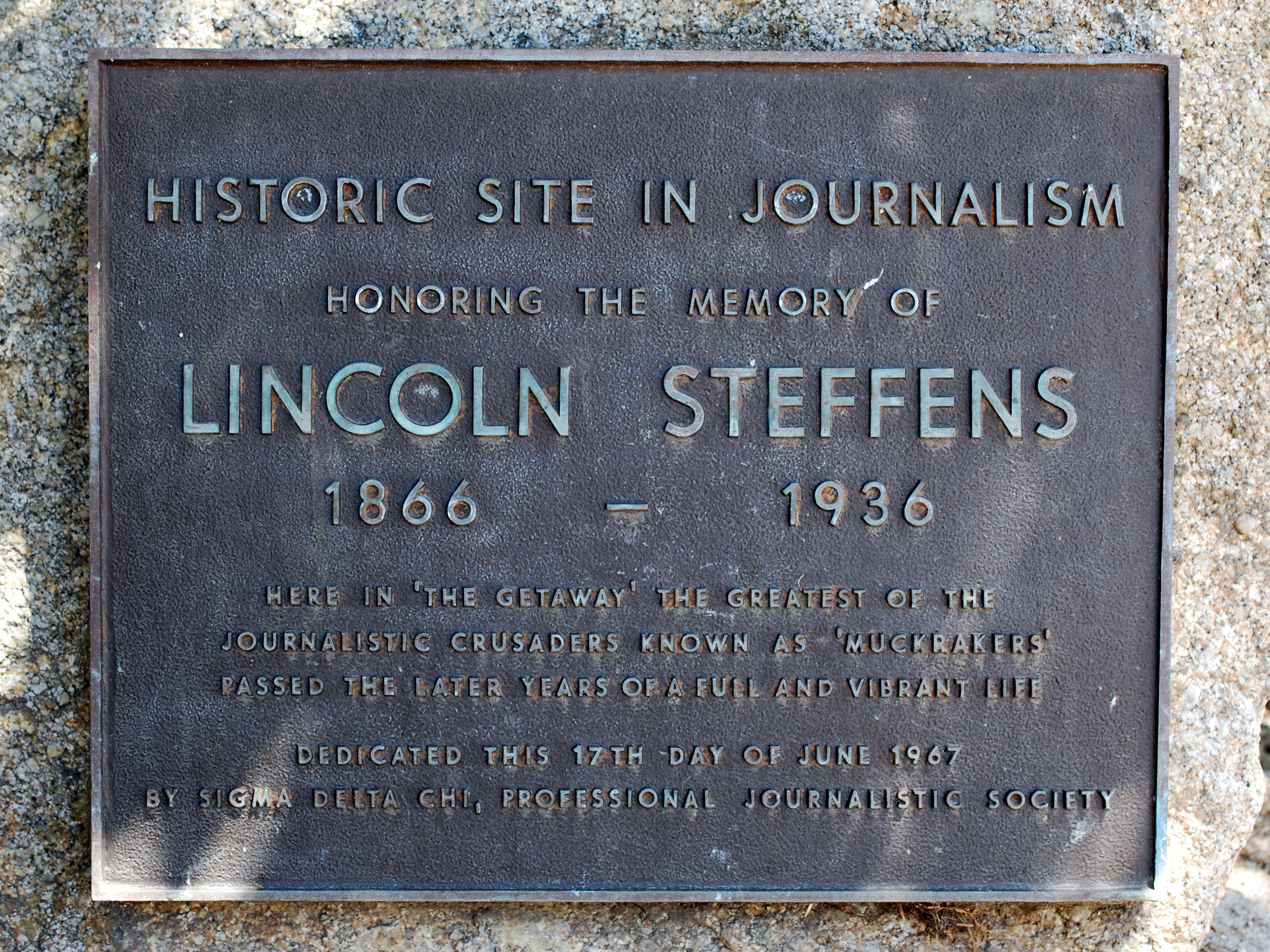
A marker commemorating Steffens' retirement home near the intersection of San Antonio and Ocean avenues in Carmel, California

Steffens married the twenty-six-year-old socialist writer Leonore (Ella) Sophie Winter in 1924 and moved to Italy, where their son Peter was born in San Remo.

In 1927, they relocated to Carmel-by-the-Sea, California, the most significant art colony on the Pacific Coast, and settled in a cottage close to the intersection of San Antonio Street and Ocean Avenue. The cottage underwent renovation in 1992.

During their stay, he authored his autobiography and managed the Pacific Weekly: A Western Journal of Fact and Opinion. In 1934, Willard Kenneth Bassett (15 February 1887 Oakland, California to 26 January 1954) and his wife Dorthea Castlehoun established The Pacific Weekly as a Carmel, California Leftist weekly journal, later, Lincoln Steffens gained control in June 1936. Sara Bard Field was an associate editor and Ella Winter was a literary editor.

Ella and Lincoln soon became controversial figures in the leftist politics of the region.

When John O’Shea, one of the local Carmel artists and a friend of the couple, exhibited his study of "Mr. Steffens’ soul", an image which resembled a grotesque daemon, Lincoln took a certain pride in the drawing and enjoyed the publicity it generated.

Who's Who does not give his Carmel address. We object! A student of philosophy, he has been editor of a string of newspapers and magazines including The American, Everybody's McClure's, the author of a half dozen books; a lecturer, and a prominent club man.

— Carmel Pine Cone

In 1934, Steffens and Winter helped found the San Francisco Workers' School (later the California Labor School); Steffens also served there as an advisor.

== Death ==
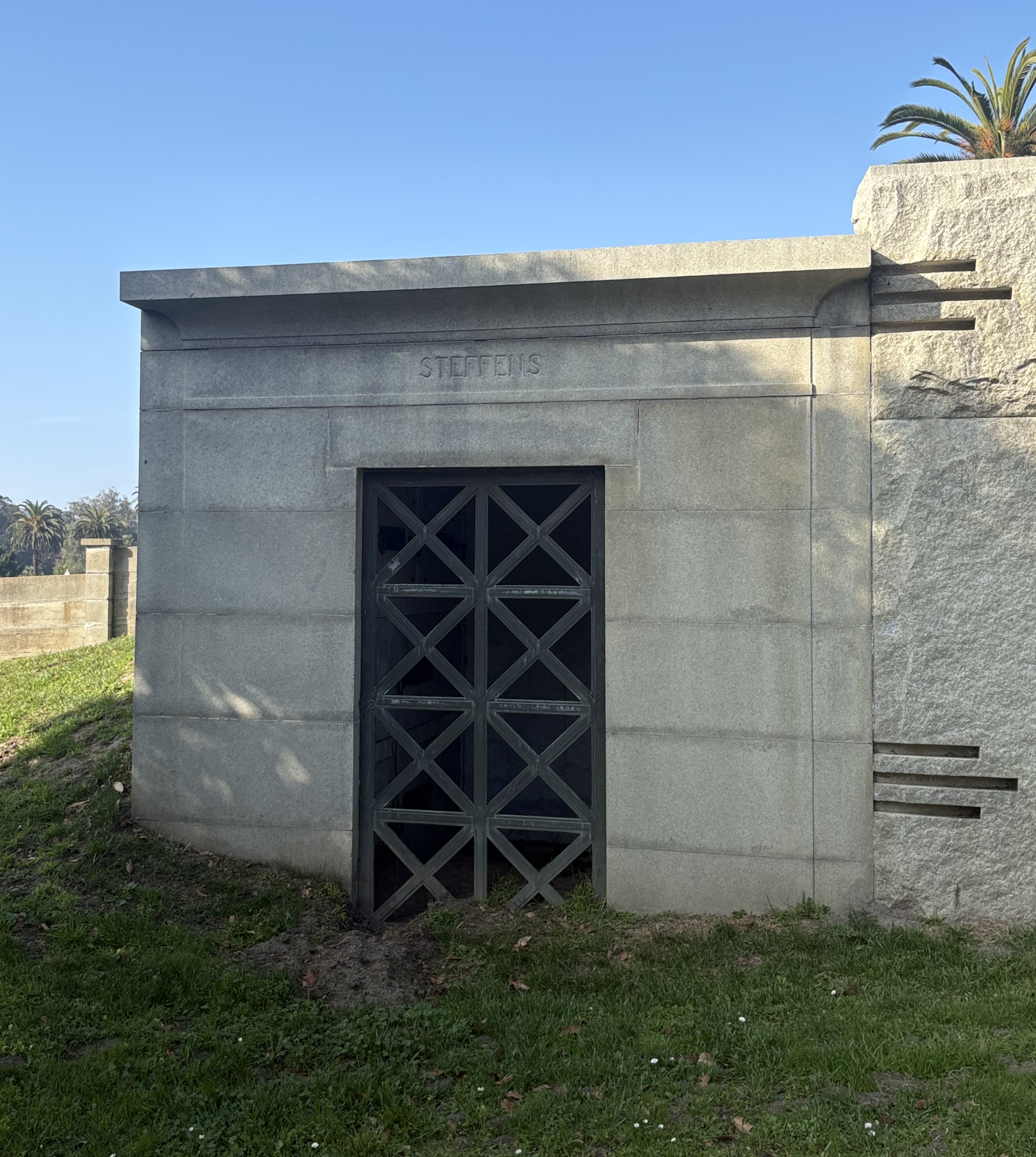
Steffens mausoleum at Cypress Lawn Memorial Park

Steffens died of a heart condition on August 9, 1936, in Carmel-by-the-Sea, California. He was interred at Cypress Lawn Memorial Park in Colma.

In 2011, Kevin Baker of The New York Times lamented that "Lincoln Steffens isn't much remembered today".

== Works ==
- Pittsburgh is Hell with the Lid Off (1903) (Painting Jules Guerin/Lincoln Steffens)
- The Shame of the Cities (1904), online at the Internet Archive
- The Traitor State (1905)
- The Struggle for Self-Government (1906), online at the Internet Archive
- Upbuilders (1909), online at the Internet Archive
- The least of these: a fact story (1910), online at the Internet Archive
- Into Mexico and --Out! (1916), online at the Internet Archive
- Autobiography of Lincoln Steffens (1931)

== In popular culture ==
Lincoln Steffens is mentioned in the Danny DeVito movie Jack the Bear (1993).

Lincoln Steffens is mentioned in the 1987 novel The Bonfire of the Vanities by Tom Wolfe.

Characters on the American crime drama series City on a Hill, which debuted in 2019, make numerous references to Lincoln Steffens.

The Autobiography of Lincoln Steffens is the favorite book of one of the members of The Group in Mary McCarthy's 1963 novel of the same title.

Autobiography of Lincoln Steffens is mentioned in the Joseph McElroy novel Women and Men. And it is mentioned as a favorite by Marilyn Monroe in her Autobiography "My Story" (she reads it during the making of All About Eve and is warned by Joseph L. Mankiewicz to not tell anyone due to possible Communist ties).

Lincoln Steffens is a somewhat frustrated witness to the political intrigue of the remapping of Europe following WW1 in the 1940 novel World's End by Upton Sinclair. In World's End, Sinclair refers to Steffens as a muckraker. The same label has been assigned to Sinclair himself.
