= The Treason of the Senate =

1906 series of magazine articles

The Treason of the Senate was a series of articles in Cosmopolitan magazine by David Graham Phillips, published in 1906. The articles were each published a month apart, beginning with the forward in February and the last article, in July. The series is a caustic exposé of the corruption of the United States Senate, particularly the corporate magnate-turned-Senator Nelson Aldrich from Rhode Island. During the composition of the articles, Phillips received help from newspaper baron William Randolph Hearst, who then desired to publish sensationalist stories to attract more readership of his publications.

The series was thought to be widely accepted because of the lack of much criticism. There were not any efforts to discredit Phillips, apart from an article written in the Chicago Tribune in March 1906, after only the foreword and first article had been published. The article is titled "No Treason In the Senate" and was asking for proof of Phillips' claims. The release of the series precipitated the passage and ratification of the Seventeenth Amendment, which provides the direct election of the U.S. senators. In the seven years it took to ratify the Amendment, some of the 20 senators criticized by Phillips in the articles resigned or died. None of the 24 senators who stood in the first direct election in 1914 was defeated. The option the Amendment allowed for appointment by the affected state's governor of a new senator when a seat is vacated mid-term has come under criticism.

== Background ==
Phillips published this series of articles at the close of what is to be considered the Gilded Age, which is the period when money and politics became very interconnected. The expansion of the railroad industry combined with increased production of steel, iron, and oil contributed to a group of immensely wealthy businessmen that came to be known by the term tycoon. These wealthy tycoons used their wealth to influence the already contentious politics of the time. The post-Civil War Reconstruction era saw calls for the punishment of the Southern rebels and social reform, including worker reform following the Industrial Revolution. There were several major instances of corruption during this period, such as the Crédit Mobilier scandal, but the most well known was the one exposed by Phillips in this series.

== Major players ==
=== Chauncey M. Depew ===
The first article of the series was published in March 1906 and focused on New York Senator Chauncey Depew and his connection to the Vanderbilt family, specifically Cornelius "Commodore" Vanderbilt who was the head of the New York Central Railroad company at the time. Depew worked as a lawyer until age twenty-nine, when he was nominated as Secretary of State of New York by the bosses of the party. Soon after, the young politician encountered corruption when he reported the New York City population as much smaller than it actually was so that representation of the rival Democratic Party could be decreased. This incident gave Depew the nickname "Depopulator Depew." After that, Depew failed to be re-elected and went to work for the New York Central Railroad company. He was employed officially as a lawyer, but in reality, he was more of an assistant to the Vanderbilts and did whatever they required. Later on, Depew's job morphed into a lobbyist position, which included bribing various politicians in order to put through legislation that would benefit the Vanderbilts.

=== Nelson W. Aldrich ===
Published in April 1906, the second article of the series concentrated on Rhode Island Senator Nelson Aldrich. Whereas Depew had connections to the Vanderbilts, Aldrich was closely associated with the Rockefeller dynasty. The Senator used his relationship with the Rockefellers to rule as an unofficial boss of a political machine because he had the ability to influence who received campaign contributions from the powerful family. He also used his position to pass several questionable tariff bills. The first bill that Aldrich had a hand in was the McKinley Tariff Act of 1890, which increased the tax on imports to almost fifty percent. In 1894, the second bill was pushed through, known as the Wilson-Gorman Tariff Act, which lowered the tariff, but by the time it was passed it included dozens of amendments that would favor big business. The last bill that Phillips focused on in this article was the Dingley Tariff Act of 1897, which once again raised tariffs.

=== Arthur P. Gorman ===
The third article of the series, published in May 1906, focused on Senator Arthur P. Gorman of Maryland. Gorman started off his political career working as a page boy in the Senate and is said to have learned all about corruption from his time there. As an adult, he worked for the Chesapeake and Ohio Canal where he used his knowledge of corruption to profit from the negotiations with railroad companies. With the wealth and power that he acquired from his work at the Canal, Gorman became a boss of the Republican Party. From there, he was able to commit more fraud and graft. He was elected to the Senate in 1881 despite scandal and, from there, Gorman and Aldrich were able to merge the two powerful political machines of the time and influence more politicians and bills to produce whatever the wealthy interests desired. Phillips draws much attention to Gorman's notable involvement in a scandal that revolved around senators taking bribes from sugar companies and gambling on sugar company stocks. In 1896, when his constituents became fed up with the numerous scandals he was involved in, Gorman was booted from his Senate seat. Yet he still wielded much influence in Maryland, and with interest groups at his back, Gorman was later reelected to the Senate.

== Minor players ==
=== John C. Spooner ===
The fourth article of the series was published in June 1906 and focused on Senator John C. Spooner of Wisconsin. Spooner's section of the exposé focused on his connection to railways in Wisconsin and the Great Lakes region that began during his days as a lawyer and continued in his Senatorial days. A major area of focus in the article was on Spooner's influence over bills that allowed railroad companies to keep land that had been granted to them to build tracks after they had passed the specified time that the Senate had laid out where they must have begun construction. or the land would be returned to the states for citizens to settle on Phillips also discussed Spooner's connection with Aldrich and Gorman and their merger of their political machines. Spooner lost his seat in 1890, but, like Gorman, was later re-elected despite his past involvement in corrupt affairs.

== See also ==
- Early 20th century muckraking
