= David Graham Phillips =

American writer

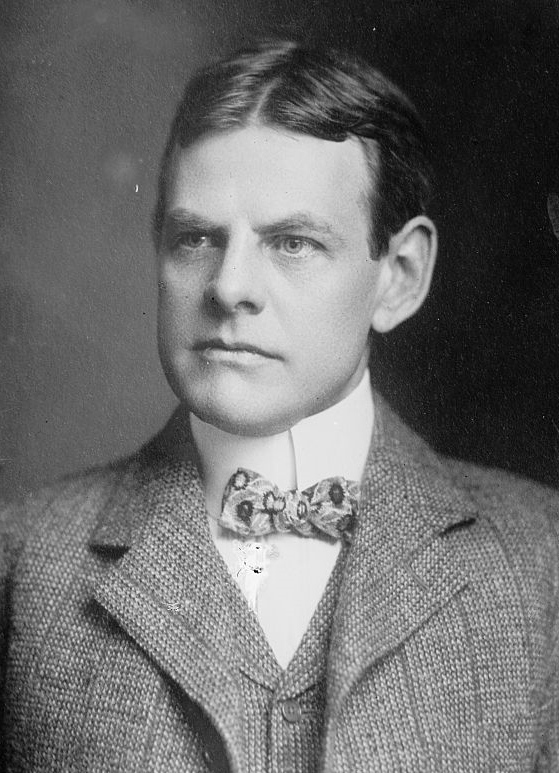
- Phillips in 1908
- Born: October 31, 1867; Madison, Indiana, U.S.
- Died: January 24, 1911 (aged 43); New York City, U.S.
- Cause of death: Murdered by shooting
- Resting place: Kensico Cemetery
- Education: DePauw University; Princeton University
- Occupations: Novelist; Journalist

David Graham Phillips (October 31, 1867 – January 24, 1911) was an American novelist and journalist of the muckraker tradition.

== Early life ==
David Graham Phillips was born in Madison, Indiana, a small town located on the Ohio River, consisting of around ten thousand inhabitants. Born on October 31, 1867, Phillips was the fourth of five children to Davis Graham Phillips Sr. and Margaret Lee. Coming from a wealthy family, Phillips, called Graham by his family, was encouraged to read and pursue an education. Specifically, his father possessed a vast library, which he persistently encouraged his son to read, especially the books regarding United States history. Phillips’ education regarding the American democratic tradition was first received at home, but later continued once enrolled in Madison's public schools. Already possessing the ability to read the bible at age 4, Phillips was an advanced student and began his college education at the age of 14 years old.

== Education ==
David Graham Phillips began his college career by following in his father's footsteps and attending Asbury College (now Depauw University) in Greencastle, Indiana. He went into college with no clear career aspirations, only a potential interest in banking. Three months later Phillips temporarily left Asbury to live with his sister in Cincinnati and studied at the University of Cincinnati. He later returned to Asbury. While studying at Asbury, Phillips roomed with Albert J. Beveridge. Beveridge and Phillips were good friends while in school and remained correspondents until Phillip's passing. His story “The Cost” reflects on his time at Asbury and includes stories of Beveridge. When Beveridge graduated in 1885, Phillips decided to transfer to Princeton for the last two years of his degree. At Princeton, Phillips took note of the caste system and the role it played in society, which inspired him to start writing. He was known to host many lively debates and discussions in his room at Princeton, and was given the nickname “La Bouche” (The Mouth) for his talkativeness and conversational abilities. David Graham Phillips graduated from Princeton in 1887.

== Career ==
After completing his education, Phillips worked as a newspaper reporter in Cincinnati, Ohio, before moving on to New York City where he was employed as a reporter for The Sun from 1890 to 1893, then columnist and editor with the New York World until 1902. In his spare time, he wrote a novel, The Great God Success, that was published in 1901. The royalty income enabled him to work as a freelance journalist while continuing to write fiction. Writing articles for various prominent magazines, he began to develop a reputation as a competent investigative journalist. Phillips' novels often commented on social issues of the day and frequently chronicled events based on his real-life journalistic experiences. He was considered a progressive and for exposing corruption in the Senate he was labelled a muckraker.

Phillips wrote an article in Cosmopolitan in March 1906, called "The Treason of the Senate," exposing campaign contributors being rewarded by certain members of the U. S. Senate. The story launched a scathing attack on Rhode Island senator Nelson W. Aldrich, and brought Phillips a great deal of national exposure. This and other similar articles helped lead to the passage of the Seventeenth Amendment to the United States Constitution, initiating popular instead of state-legislature election of U. S. senators.

David Graham Phillips is known for producing one of the most important investigations exposing details of the corruption by big businesses of the Senate, in particular, by the Standard Oil Company. He was among a few other writers during that time that helped prompt President Theodore Roosevelt to use the term “Muckrakers”.

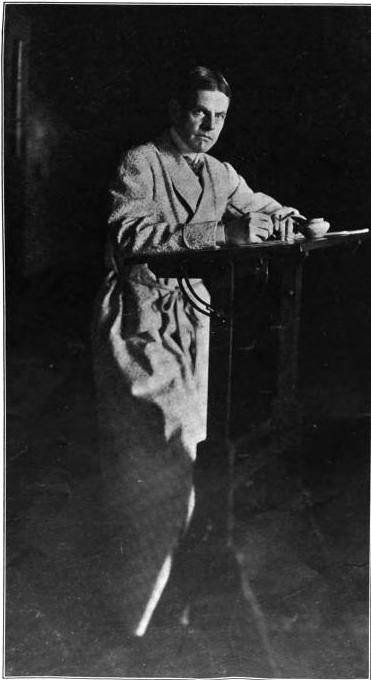
Photograph of "David Graham Phillips at work" in the March 1911 issue of The Bookman

The article inspired journalist Charles Edward Russell to insist to his boss William Randolph Hearst, who had just recently purchased the Cosmopolitan magazine, that he push his journalists to explore the Senate corruption as well. Philips was offered the position to explore more information about the corruption and bring it into the public's eye. Philips’ brother Harrison and Gustavus Myers were hired as research assistants for Philips. Hearst commented to his readers about Philips starting a series that would reveal the Senate corruption so much, that most Senators would resign.

This held true for some of the Senators, such as New York Senators Chauncey M. Depew and Thomas Collier Platt. Philips exposed Depew as receiving more than $50,000 from several companies. He also helped educate the public on how the senators were selected and that it was held in the hands of a few bosses in a tight circle, helping increase the corruption level. As a result of these articles, only four of the twenty-one senators that Philips wrote about were still in office. Philips also had some of the greatest success as a muckraker, because he helped change the U.S. Constitution, with the passage of the 17th Amendment, creating popular election for senators.

His talent for writing was not the only thing that helped him stand out in the newsroom. Philips was known to dress in a white suit with a large chrysanthemum in his lapel.

== Literary styles and themes ==
David Graham Phillips's literary style reflected a unique fusion of investigative journalism and fictional storytelling techniques. Early in his career, particularly in works such as The Treason of the Senate, Phillips utilized composite characters, reconstructed dialogue, and vividly dramatized scenes to deliver factual material in a gripping, narrative form. His style emphasized clarity, pace, and emotional impact, aiming to reach a wide middle-class audience rather than a restricted literary elite.

Phillips's work was characterized by an explicitly moralistic and didactic tone. Critics at the time observed that Phillips often attempted to guide the reader's judgments directly, leaving little room for ambiguity. Throughout his novels and journalism, he consistently addressed major political and social themes, including the corruption of American political institutions, the economic exploitation enabled by corporate monopolies, and the betrayal of democratic ideals.

In the latter half of his career, Phillips increasingly turned his attention to gender and social issues, particularly the limited opportunities and systemic oppression faced by women, as illustrated in Susan Lenox: Her Fall and Rise. His protagonists, often emerging from middle-class or working-class backgrounds, struggle not merely against personal shortcomings but against entrenched societal forces. This consistent concern with morality, democracy, and social injustice situated Phillips's work firmly within the broader intellectual currents of the Progressive Era.

== Role of naturalism and realism ==
Phillips's writing demonstrated a strong allegiance to the literary traditions of realism and naturalism. His portrayal of American society was unflinching, exposing the mechanisms of political corruption, business monopolization, and social inequality with vivid, often scathing detail.

Like other naturalist writers of the period, Phillips emphasized the power of external forces — such as class structures, political systems, and economic conditions — in determining individual destiny. Characters in his novels were frequently portrayed as trapped by their environments, illustrating the limits of personal agency in a corrupt society. His work suggested that the American Dream of upward mobility and democratic equality was often an illusion sustained by those in power.

Phillips's blend of fact and dramatization created a new form of "reportage fiction," which brought the techniques of investigative journalism into novelistic prose. This hybrid style enhanced the emotional resonance and immediacy of his political critiques, helping to align his literary efforts with the broader Progressive reform movement. Far from being passive documentation, Phillips's realism served as an instrument of social criticism, intended to awaken the conscience of a national readership and advocate for systemic reform.

== Death ==
On the morning of January 23, 1911, Phillips was outside the Princeton Club at Gramercy Park in New York City when he was shot six times at close range by Fitzhugh Coyle Goldsborough, a Harvard-educated musician. Goldsborough, a violinist with the Pittsburgh Symphony Orchestra, hailed from a prominent family in Maryland. His fascination with Phillips's work culminated in an obsession, particularly regarding the author's portrayal of the character Margaret Severance in the novel “The Fashionable Adventures of Joshua Craig”, which Goldsborough believed to be a caricature of his sister, Julia Goldsborough. Following the incident, Phillips was admitted to Bellevue Hospital, where he died a day later, on January 24, 1911.

Phillips developed a substantial body of work before his death, encompassing twenty-two novels, numerous articles, short stories, and plays. After his passing, his sister Carolyn took the initiative to organize his final manuscript for posthumous publication under the title “Susan Lenox: Her Fall and Rise.” This book generated considerable controversy, as it presented the narrative of a woman compelled into prostitution for survival. In 1931, that book would be made into an MGM motion picture of the same name and starring Greta Garbo and Clark Gable. Additional novels released posthumously included “The Price She Paid” (1912), “George Helm” (1912), and “Degarmo's Wife and Other Stories” (1913). Furthermore, the book versions of “The Treason of the Senate” (1953) and “Contemporaries” (1981) were also published after Phillips's death.

David Graham Phillips is interred in the Kensico Cemetery in Valhalla, New York.

== Novels ==
- The Great God Success (1901)
- A Woman Ventures (1902)
- Her Serene Highness (1902)
- Golden Fleece (1903)
- The Master-Rogue (1903)
- The Cost (1904)
- The Social Secretary (1905)
- The Mother-Light (written anonymously) (1905)
- The Deluge (1905)
- The Plum Tree (1905)
- The Fortune Hunter (1906)
- The Second Generation (1906). Reissued as Daily Mail sixpenny novel No. 161 in 1912, with illustrations by G. H. Evison.
- Light-Fingered Gentry (1907)
- Old Wives for New (1908)
- The Fashionable Adventures of Joshua Craig (1909)
- The Hungry Heart (1909)
- The Husband's Story (1910)
- White Magic (1910)
- The Grain of Dust (1911)
- The Conflict (1911)
- George Helm (1912)
- The Price She Paid (1912)
- Degarmo's Wife (1913)
- Susan Lenox: Her Fall and Rise (1917)

== Drama ==
- The Worth of a Woman (A Play in Four Acts) and A Point of Law [a one-act play] (1908)

== Non-fiction ==
- The Reign of Gilt (1905)
- The Treason of the Senate (1906)
- "Restless Husbands" (essay), written in 1909, published by Cosmopolitan in August, 1911
