= The Shame of the Cities =

1904 book by Lincoln Steffens

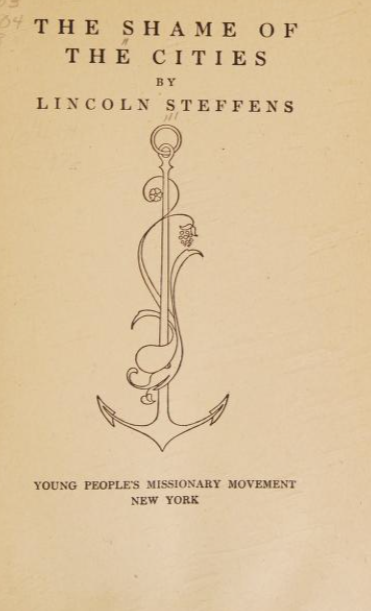
- Title page for The Shame of the Cities (1904)
- Author: Lincoln Steffens
- Language: English
- Subject: Municipal government, political corruption, political machines
- Genre: Muckraking
- Publisher: McClure, Phillips and Company
- Publication date: 1904
- Publication place: United States

The Shame of the Cities is a book written by American author Lincoln Steffens. Published in 1904, it is a collection of articles which Steffens had written for McClure’s Magazine. It reports on the workings of corrupt political machines in several major cities in the United States, along with a few efforts to combat them. It is considered one of several early major pieces of muckraking journalism, but Steffens later claimed that the work made him "the first muckraker."

Though Steffens' subject was municipal corruption, he did not present his work as an exposé of corruption but wanted to draw attention to the public's complicity in allowing corruption to continue. Steffens tried to advance a theory of city corruption, which he claimed was the result of "big business men" who corrupted city government for their own ends and special educational "the typical business man," average Americans who ignored politics and allowed such corruption to continue. He framed his work as an attempt "to sound for the civic pride of an apparently shameless citizenship" by making the public face their responsibility in the persistence of municipal corruption.

== Background ==
Steffens began working on the articles that would become The Shame of the Cities after he joined the staff of McClure's in 1901. He had been hired as a managing editor for the magazine but, as Steffens biographers note, struggled with the job. Steffens writes that S. S. McClure, the magazine's co-founder, sent him on an open-ended assignment to learn how to become an editor. According to Steffens, McClure said, "Get out of here, travel, go—somewhere. Go out in the advertising department. Ask them where they have transportation credit. Buy a railroad ticket, get on a train, and there, where it lands you, there you will learn to edit a magazine."

After setting out in the spring of 1902, Steffens learned of and arranged a meeting with Joseph W. Folk, the recently elected circuit attorney of St. Louis. Folk had been elected thanks to a temporary alliance between a business-backed reform movement and Edward Butler, the boss of the city's Democratic Party machine; Butler allied with the reformers, in part, to help get his son elected to Congress. After his election, though, Folk launched a massive investigation into the city's corruption, arresting many prominent St. Louis legislators and businessmen, while scaring others into fleeing the state—and, in some cases, fleeing the country.

Steffens was not the first author of "Tweed Days in St. Louis", the McClure’s piece detailing Folk's investigation of Butler's machine; he initially commissioned Claude Wetmore, a St. Louis author, to write the piece. Wetmore, according to Steffens biographer Justin Kaplan, "was an honest reporter, but he happened to live in St. Louis and he wanted to continue to live there. And so Wetmore steered a middle course, left out crucial names and facts, went easy on prominent citizens went easy even on Butler, who was to come to trial that summer". Steffens rewrote the article from scratch, adding all of the details Wetmore had left out; Wetmore, in turn, insisted that Steffens sign the article as well, so that he too would be targeted when St. Louis citizens accused them of slander.

Steffens' next assignment was in Minneapolis. He claimed that McClure tried to take editorial control of his story. According to Steffens, before he left for Minneapolis, McClure told him that his next article would "point out that democracy is at fault [for urban corruption], that one man has to run a city just as one man has to run a business to make it a success. …We had a pretty hot fight, and McClure won. What I went to Minneapolis to write about was that democracy was a failure and that a good dictator was what is needed." McClure had also been concerned by the anti-business bias he perceived in "Tweed Days in St. Louis.

In Minneapolis, Steffens discovered a massive protection racket enforced by the police and headed by the mayor, Dr. Albert Alonzo Ames. He learned that the mayor and the police, consulting professional criminals for advice, had organized a citywide system to extort protection money from the city's houses of prostitution, which were actually forbidden under city law, and its saloons. He also obtained and publicized "The Big Mitt Ledger," an accounting book that a group of card cheats used to record their winnings and the bribes that they had paid to city officials.

McClure and Steffens argued over what city to cover next. Steffens wanted to return to St. Louis, but McClure wanted Steffens to investigate Chicago and thought that it would have even more corruption than Minneapolis and lead to even greater public interest and magazine sales. Ida Tarbell helped settle their dispute in Steffens' favor, and he returned to St. Louis to continue writing about Folk's efforts to clean up the city.

Steffens then received a request from the children of the late Jay Gould to investigate Pittsburgh, where, they claimed, they had evidence that the dominant political machines were conspiring to keep them out of the city's railroad business. The Goulds decided not to help Steffens after all once he arrived in the city, but Steffens found a different ally: Oliver McClintock, a businessman who had spent years learning about the city's corruption on his own. Using McClintock's findings, Steffens published his article on Pittsburgh in the May 1903 issue of McClure's.

Steffens then traveled to Philadelphia. In his autobiography, Steffens notes that he expected Philadelphia to be like every other city that he had visited, but he was surprised by his findings there. The city government was still corrupt despite having been reformed; in fact, he found, the city's charter, known as the Bullitt Charter, centralized power in the mayor's office, a reform Steffens himself had suggested in the past. Because of his findings in Philadelphia, Steffens later wrote, he "had to note a ... new and startling theory, viz.: that the form of government did not matter; that constitutions and charters did not affect essentially the actual government".

After finishing in Philadelphia, Steffens, at McClure's suggestion, went to Chicago, expecting to find sensational corruption. He did not find the story he anticipated. Instead, as he learned from talking to Chicago reformer Walter L. Fisher, Chicago reformers had waged a long campaign against corrupt politicians and had actually taken control of the city legislature. After his article about Chicago received a positive popular response, Steffens returned to New York to write a final article about good city governance.

When politicians backed by the Tammany Hall political machine won the New York elections of 1903 and ousted the good government Steffens had praised, Steffens, feeling "all up in the air," traveled to Cos Cob, Connecticut, where he adapted these articles into The Shame of the Cities. McClure, Philips, and Co. first published the book in 1904.

== Synopsis ==
Steffens' first article in The Shame of the Cities is "Tweed Days in St. Louis", published in October 1902. Steffens discusses Circuit Attorney Folk's efforts to clean up the city's corruption. Bribery, Steffens noted, had become commonplace in city government by the turn of the century. Responding to public concerns about corruption, the local Democratic Party put together a "reform" ticket, though this was "[s]imply part of the game", rather than out of a sincere desire to reform. Folk, however, took his duties seriously. He launched an investigation into the city's corruption after seeing a newspaper article which claimed that a bribe fund had been set up in a local bank to pay off city legislators who helped pass a streetcar bill. Folk found the bribe money in the bank, and began indicting participants in the bribery plot, leading a few of them to flee the state or the country. As he began to win convictions, other men involved in corruption decided to testify against their associates. Steffens concludes the article by claiming that "In all cities, the better classes—the business men—are the sources of corruption"; Folk, he notes, "has shown St. Louis that its bankers, brokers, corporation officers,—its business men are the sources of evil". Furthermore, he warns, "what went on in St. Louis is going on in most of our cities, towns, and villages. The problem of municipal government in America has not been solved".

"The Shame of Minneapolis", published in January 1903, tells the story of Mayor "Doc" Ames. Steffens claims that Ames, on being elected mayor in 1900, "set out upon a career of corruption for which deliberateness, invention, and avarice has never been equaled". Ames and the complicit police force, in exchange for bribes, chose to ignore illegal gambling and prostitution. This arrangement attracted criminals to the city, many of whom arranged with the police to be left alone—according to Steffens, "the government of a city asked criminals to rob the people". The foreman of the city's grand jury, Hovey C. Clarke, was primarily responsible for breaking up the Ames machine. After being selected to the jury in April 1902, he and his colleagues paid several private detectives to investigate the machine. After the conviction of Ames' brother, Fred, Mayor Ames fled the state, and the city government was thrown into disarray. The new acting mayor, Alderman D. Percy Jones, replaced Ames' men on the police force with good officers Ames had fired. "Minneapolis should be clean and sweet for a little while at least", Steffens concluded.

"The Shamelessness of St. Louis", Steffens' follow-up piece to "Tweed Days", asks: "Is democracy possible?” Though Clarke and Jones had cleaned up Minneapolis, St. Louis, Steffens proclaims, "is unmoved and unashamed. St. Louis seems to me to be something new in the history of the government of the people, by the rascals, for the rich". This article focuses on Edward R. "Boss" Butler, the Democratic Party boss who, Steffens claimed, was the real ruler of the city, even though St. Louis typically leaned Republican. Butler was a "boodler", one who sold for personal gain "the rights, privileges, franchises, and real property of the city" to prominent businessmen and corporations. The scale of their operation was vast, Steffens reported: "In St. Louis the regularly organized thieves who rule have sold $50,000,000 worth of franchises and other valuable municipal assets. This is the estimate made for me by a banker, who said that the boodler got not one-tenth the value of the things they sold, but were content because they got it all themselves". Steffens discusses new developments in Folk's investigation, especially Butler's trial and conviction. He notes that Folk's investigation is ongoing, but that the people of St. Louis were not roused to action by all of the corruption: few had registered to vote in the previous elections, and there had been no attempt to organize a reform ticket independent of the two main parties.

Steffens' next article, published in May 1903, was "Pittsburg: A City Ashamed". Steffens discusses the city's late boss Christopher L. Magee, who, he concedes, "did not, technically speaking, rob the town. …But surely he does not deserve a monument". Magee, reports Steffens, found a partner in William Flinn: "A happy, profitable combination, it lasted for life. Magee wanted power, Flinn wealth. …Magee was the sower, Flinn the reaper". Together, McGee and Flinn took complete control of the city government, leading Steffens to claim "Tammany in comparison is a plaything". Because they controlled the city council, they were able to direct city contracts to their own businesses; Flinn's firm received virtually all of the city's paving contracts between 1887 and 1896, and Magee took control of the city's railway franchises, valued at $30,000,000. Though Pittsburgh citizens finally organized a Citizens' party to overthrow the machine in 1902, and won that year's election, Steffens reports that one of the party's committee members, Thomas Steele Bigelow, co-opted the party, attracted Magee and Flinn's former supporters, and became the city's new boss. Steffens notes that a new organization, the Voters' Civic League, has been organized the fight the new Bigelow machine, and comments that "the effort of Pittsburg, pitiful as it is, is a spectacle good for American self-respect, and its sturdiness is a promise for poor old Pennsylvania".

Steffens then wrote "Philadelphia: Corrupt and Contented", published in July 1903. Philadelphia, Steffens argues, is an important case for Americans to study, since its corruption in 1903 existed even after the city had reformed and adopted a new city charter in 1885. The Philadelphia machine, Steffens reports, "controls the whole process of voting, and practices fraud at every stage". He documents the abuses of Mayor Samuel H. Ashbridge, who, after he took office, allegedly told the city postmaster, "I shall get out of this office all there is in it for Samuel H. Ashbridge". Steffens notes at the end of this article that the city's new mayor, John Weaver, appears to be a good mayor: he had killed "macing" bills in the state legislature that would have allowed machine-connected companies to buy control of city water and power services. But, Steffens asks readers, "Why should he serve the people and not the ring?"

Steffens' final two articles in this series discuss examples of comparatively good city government. The first is "Chicago: Half Free and Fighting On", published in October 1903. Chicago, Steffens says, is not yet "an example of good municipal government", but it nonetheless "should be celebrated among American cities for reform, real reform". He discusses the work of the Municipal Voters' League, a group formed by the Civic Federation and led by George C. Cole. Cole and his allies publicized corrupt aldermen's city council records and war records, or threatened to release more compromising records, to convince those candidates not to run for reelection. Over the course of several elections, the League finally achieved a nominal majority of its own candidates in the city government, but was unable to organize them into a unified faction, leading a discouraged Cole to quit his League work. The League's new secretary, Walter L. Fisher, has since taken a leadership role: Steffens terms him a "reform boss". Steffens is optimistic about the city's prospects for good government, and gives credit for this development primarily to Chicago's informed and engaged public. "The city of Chicago", he declares, "is ruled by the citizens of Chicago."

The final article in the book, published just a month later, is "New York: Good Government to the Test". Unlike all of the other cities he has covered, Steffens notes, New York, under Mayor Seth Low, actually has a good administration: "for an American city, it has been not only honest, but able, undeniably one of the best in the whole country". Most of this article, however, deals not with Mayor Low, but with the politicians of Tammany Hall. Tammany machine rule, Steffens notes, is "corruption by consent", which it achieves through the largest system of graft Steffens had ever seen. As a New Yorker himself, Steffens expresses concern that Tammany politicians would undertake superficial reforms to regain power; they would offer the appearance of good government, while remaining corrupt and self-serving. He notes, "I don’t fear a bad Tammany mayor; I dread the election of a good one." In the article's postscript, added for the book, he notes that the Tammany mayoral candidate had won in the recent city elections.

== Major themes ==
Though Steffens' reporting did expose the broader public to examples of corruption in some major American cities, Steffens points out in The Shame of the Cities that exposing corruption was not his purpose. He writes in the introduction to the book that, to him, the most important new information in his work was not the evidence of corruption, but the evidence of the public's complicity in it: "The people are not innocent. That is the only 'news' in all the journalism of these articles". He tries to debunk popular explanations for city corruption. He notes that immigrants, who frequently received blame for spurring corruption, could not be responsible for Philadelphia's corruption, since "Philadelphia, with 47 percent. of its population native-born of native-born parents, is the most American of our greater cities". Steffens makes the point more forcefully in the introduction to the book. "But not one class is at fault, nor any one breed, not any particular interest or group of interests", he writes. "The misgovernment of the American people is misgovernment by the American people".

Steffens tried to show that corruption developed in the same way in different cities. Though the activities of different machines differed, Steffens found that all the machines shared a common origin: they began, according to Robert B. Downs, as "an alliance between 'respectable' businessmen and disreputable gang politicians to rob the taxpayers". Though most people, Steffens concluded in "Tweed Days in St. Louis", "blame the politicians and the vicious and ignorant poor" for corruption, "In all cities, the better classes—the business men—are the sources of corruption". Steffens clarifies this claim in the book's introduction; there, he specifically castigates the "big business man" as "the source of corruption", calling him "a self-righteous fraud".

But Steffens also claims that "the good citizen, the typical business man" is partly responsible for city corruption, as he is too absorbed in his own affairs to worry much about politics. Throughout the book, Steffens notes the seeming complacency of the public, even when they were fully aware of corruption. He concluded "Tweed Days in St. Louis" by stating, "The people may be tired of it [corrupt municipal government], but they cannot give it up—not yet". In "The Shame of Minneapolis", he reports that many citizens, rather than supporting the grand jury's efforts to clean up the city, tried to discourage them: "What startled the jury most, however, was the character of the citizens who were sent to them to dissuade them from their course. No reform I ever studied has failed to bring out this phenomenon of virtuous cowardice, the baseness of the decent citizen". As the Folk investigation continued in St. Louis, Steffens notes, the people were so apathetic that they passively allowed three convicted politicians to return to their seats in the city legislature. In Philadelphia, he noted, "good people there defend corruption and boast of their machine."

Steffens is also skeptical of reform efforts. He is concerned that popular reform movements are inadequate to really clean up government: “'reforms' are spasmodic efforts to punish bad rulers and get somebody that will give us good government or something that will make it". As Steffens biographer Patrick F. Palermo writes, Steffens' "answer to the problem of corruption was good, strong men. …Steffens seriously argued that this corrupt system that either co-opted or overwhelmed its opponents could be tamed by individuals".

Ultimately, though, Steffens still expresses faith that the public can be made to care about having good government. In the introduction to The Shame of the Cities, Steffens writes: "We Americans may have failed. We may be mercenary and selfish. Democracy with us may be impossible and corruption inevitable, but these articles, if they have proved nothing else, have demonstrated beyond doubt that we can stand the truth; that there is pride in the character of American citizenship; and that this pride may be a power in the land". He thought that the public could still be shamed into action against corrupt government: the goal of his book, he writes at its outset, is "to sound the civic pride of an apparently shameless citizenship". The reaction to his articles, he thought, demonstrated that "our shamelessness is superficial, that beneath it lies a pride which, being real, may save us yet."

== Reception and influence ==
=== Critical reaction ===
The Shame of the Cities received widespread critical acclaim upon its publication. Public figures described Steffens' work as groundbreaking. Newspaper editor William Allen White, for example, declared that the book "has done for American cities what De Tocqueville did for the country over a hundred years ago". The owner of the Chicago Tribune, Medill McCormick, also praised the book, saying, "Nothing has been printed which so well portrays municipal conditions in America."

The book received equally positive reviews in major American magazines. Alfred Hodder, in the literary journal The Bookman, declared that the book's "facts are of the utmost interest and importance, or should be, to every man in the United States who has at heart any wish to be a decent citizen." The Independent also considered The Shame of the Cities a book "of the utmost importance". The Outlook gave the book a slightly cooler reception, claiming that it was worth reading, but likely overstated the prevalence of municipal corruption in the country. Each of these reviews draws attention to Steffens' claim that business is to blame for urban corruption, rather than the poor or the nature of government itself; however, they do not directly discuss Steffens' observations about public responsibility for corruption.

The book, furthermore, made Steffens a national celebrity. He became such a prominent figure that "Even a cigar company joined the rush to praise Steffens by naming a cigar after him and featuring his face on the box". William Randolph Hearst invited Steffens to his home for dinner. Steffens also became highly in demand as a speaker, receiving speaking invitations from across the country, including from his college, the University of California. He also gained international fame: The Shame of the Cities became very popular in England, and the editor of a London magazine offered Steffens a comfortable job if he felt like moving there.

=== Literary significance ===
Steffens' work helped usher in the muckraking era. Of his articles, the most significant to the development of muckraking journalism was "The Shame of Minneapolis," which was published in the January 1903 issue of McClure’s alongside a section from Tarbell's The History of the Standard Oil Company and Ray Stannard Baker's "The Right to Work: The Story of the Non-Striking Miners". Peter Hartshorn notes the importance of this best-selling issue in muckraking's rise to prominence: "Other magazines, notably Collier’s, Leslie’s, and Everybody’s, quickly grasped what the public was demanding: articles that not only entertained and informed but also exposed. Americans were captivated by the muckrakers and their ability to provide names, dollar amounts, and other titillating specifics". The articles that make up The Shame of the Cities, especially the Minneapolis article, thus played a key role in popularizing muckraking and its spread to other publications.

=== Political significance ===
Steffens' account of Folk helped him rise to political prominence in Missouri. The two St. Louis articles, along with another follow-up piece Steffens wrote in April 1904, helped rally support for Folk and helped him be elected governor of Missouri later that year.

In the introduction to The Shame of the Cities, Steffens himself draws attention to reform in St. Louis. "The Shamelessness of St. Louis", he claims, finally drove the city's people to action against the reigning machine, as they worked to prove wrong his claim that the public was apathetic: "From that moment the city has been determined and active, and boodle seems to be doomed".

Steffens' work along with the other muckrakers also helped change the national political climate. Palermo credits the muckrakers and their calls for reform for helping progressive reformers rise to political power in the states, and, to a lesser extent, in Congress, by 1906. Newly elected governors and members of Congress, he notes, followed the muckrakers' example, and "thundered forth their condemnation of the 'interests,’ 'the system,’ and 'privilege.' Within four years, the progressive movement would be the most potent force in American politics."

== See also ==
- Muckraking
- Progressivism in the United States
- The Shame of the States
