= C. P. Connolly =

American lawyer (1863–1935)

Christopher Patrick Connolly (1863 – 1935), better known as C.P. Connolly, was an American investigative journalist who was associated for many years with Collier's Weekly and the Muckrakers.

Connolly was a former Montana prosecutor. He is remembered in particular for his extensive reporting on the case of Leo Frank, a Jewish businessman who was convicted and sentenced to death in August 1913 for the slaying of a thirteen-year-old girl.

"I feel satisfied that the US Supreme Court will be moved to give us some relief," Frank wrote on January 4, 1915, in a series of letters he wrote to Connolly. "I receive a great deal of mail and many of the writers compliment your articles in Collier's.

Connolly also covered the Idaho trial of the leaders of the Western Federation of Miners, who were accused of the assassination in 1905 of a former Idaho governor, Frank Steunenberg, putatively in retaliation for Steunenberg's calling of federal troops to suppress what he called a union "reign of terror." Clarence Darrow defended the miners. In a surprise turn of events, the defendants, who included the union's most visible leader, one-eyed Big Bill Haywood, also a founder of the new Industrial Workers of the World (IWW), were acquitted by the jury. Connolly wrote of the case:

The press sends out to the world the overt acts of wage earners driven to desperation and suppresses the recital of the crimes which engender these conditions, though they may be a matter of public knowledge and judicial inquiry." CJRBooks - Big Trouble, by J. Anthony Lukas at archives.cjr.org
