= Muckraker =

Progressive-Era reform-minded investigative journalist in the US

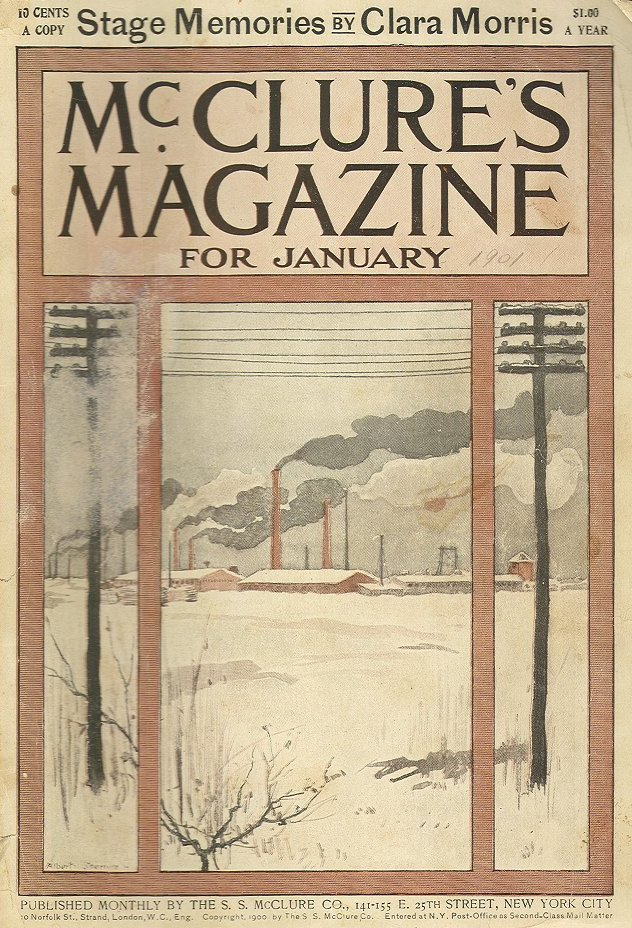
McClure's (cover, January 1901) published many early muckraker articles.

Muckrakers were reform-minded journalists, writers, and photographers in the Progressive Era in the United States (1890s–1920s) who claimed to expose corruption and wrongdoing in established institutions, often through sensationalist publications. The modern term generally references investigative journalism or watchdog journalism; investigative journalists in the United States are occasionally called "muckrakers" informally.

The muckrakers played a highly visible role during the Progressive Era. Muckraking magazines—notably McClure's, of the publisher S. S. McClure—took on corporate monopolies and political machines, while trying to raise public awareness and anger at urban poverty, unsafe working conditions, prostitution, and child labor. Most of the muckrakers wrote nonfiction, but fictional exposés often had a major impact, as well, notably those written by novelist Upton Sinclair.

In contemporary American usage, the term can refer to journalists or others who "dig deep for the facts" or, when used pejoratively, those who seek to cause scandal. The term is a reference to a character in John Bunyan's classic Pilgrim's Progress, "the Man with the Muck-rake", who rejected salvation to focus on filth. It became popular after President Theodore Roosevelt referred to the character in a 1906 speech; Roosevelt acknowledged that "the men with the muck rakes are often indispensable to the well-being of society; but only if they know when to stop raking the muck."

== History ==
While a literature of reform had already appeared by the mid-19th century, the kind of reporting that would come to be called "muckraking" began to appear around 1900. By the 1900s, magazines such as Collier's Weekly, Munsey's Magazine and McClure's Magazine were already in wide circulation and read avidly by the growing middle class. The January 1903 issue of McClure's is considered to be the official beginning of muckraking journalism, although the muckrakers would get their label later. Ida M. Tarbell ("The History of Standard Oil"), Lincoln Steffens ("The Shame of the Cities") and Ray Stannard Baker ("The Right to Work"), simultaneously published famous works in that single issue. Claude H. Wetmore and Lincoln Steffens' previous article "Tweed Days in St. Louis" in McClure's October 1902 issue was called the first muckraking article.

=== Changes in journalism prior to 1903 ===
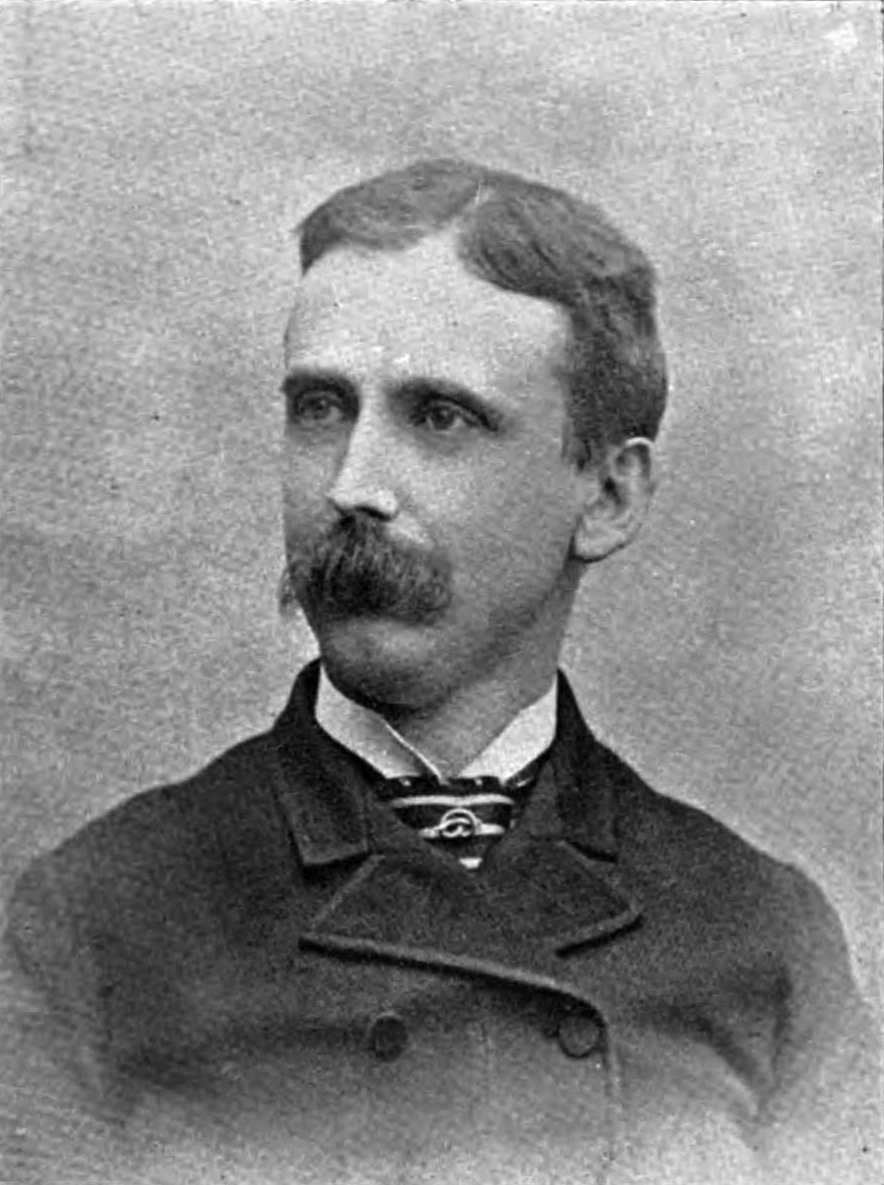
Julius Chambers

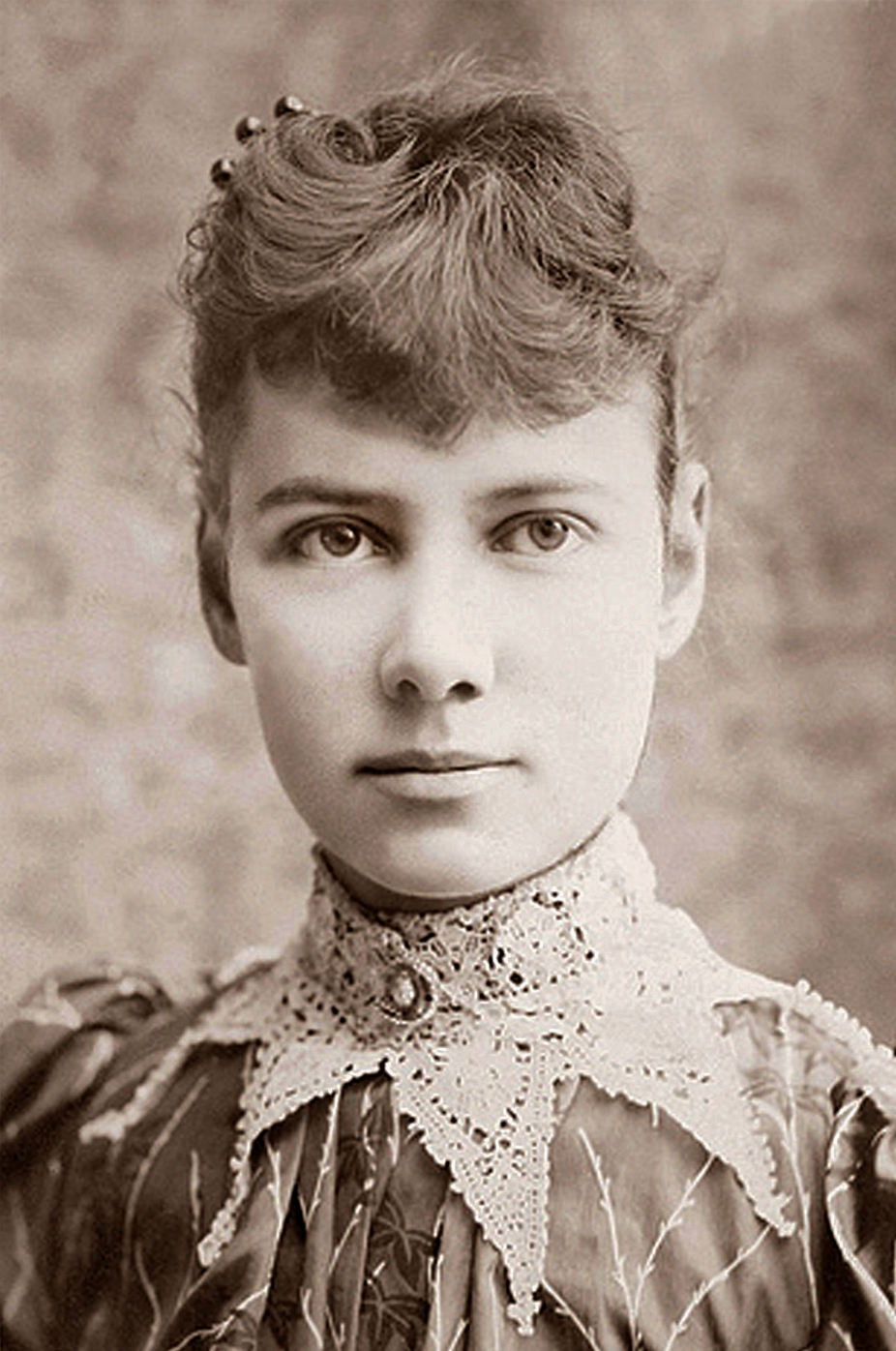
Nellie Bly

The muckrakers would become known for their investigative journalism, evolving from the eras of "personal journalism"—a term historians Emery and Emery used in The Press and America (6th ed.) to describe the 19th century newspapers that were steered by strong leaders with an editorial voice (p. 173)—and yellow journalism.

One of the biggest urban scandals of the post-Civil War era was the corruption and bribery case of Tammany boss William M. Tweed in 1871 that was uncovered by newspapers. In his first muckraking article, "Tweed Days in St. Louis", Lincoln Steffens exposed the graft, a system of political corruption, that was ingrained in St. Louis. While some muckrakers had already worked for reform newspapers of the personal journalism variety, such as Steffens who was a reporter for the New York Evening Post under Edwin Lawrence Godkin, other muckrakers had worked for yellow journals before moving on to magazines around 1900, such as Charles Edward Russell who was a journalist and editor of Joseph Pulitzer's New York World. Publishers of yellow journals, such as Joseph Pulitzer and William Randolph Hearst, were more intent on increasing circulation through scandal, crime, entertainment and sensationalism.

Just as the muckrakers became well known for their crusades, journalists from the eras of "personal journalism" and "yellow journalism" had gained fame through their investigative articles, including articles that exposed wrongdoing. In yellow journalism, the idea was to stir up the public with sensationalism and thus sell more papers. If, in the process, a social wrong was exposed that the average man could get indignant about, that was fine, but it was not the intent to correct social wrongs as it was with true investigative journalists and muckrakers.

Julius Chambers of the New York Tribune could be considered to be the original muckraker. Chambers undertook a journalistic investigation of Bloomingdale Asylum in 1872, having himself committed with the help of some of his friends and his newspaper's city editor. His intent was to obtain information about alleged abuse of inmates. When articles and accounts of the experience were published in the Tribune, it led to the release of twelve patients who were not mentally ill, a reorganization of the staff and administration of the institution and, eventually, to a change in the lunacy laws. This later led to the publication of the book A Mad World and Its Inhabitants (1876). From this time onward, Chambers was frequently invited to speak on the rights of the mentally ill and the need for proper facilities for their accommodation, care and treatment.

Nellie Bly, another yellow journalist, used the undercover technique of investigation in reporting Ten Days in a Mad-House, her 1887 exposé on patient abuse at Bellevue Mental Hospital, first published as a series of articles in The World newspaper and then as a book. Nellie would go on to write more articles on corrupt politicians, sweat-shop working conditions and other societal injustices.

==== Other works that predate the muckrakers ====
- Helen Hunt Jackson (1831–1885) – A Century of Dishonor, U.S. policy regarding Native Americans.
- Henry Demarest Lloyd (1847–1903) – Wealth Against Commonwealth, exposed the corruption within the Standard Oil Company.
- Ida B. Wells (1862–1931) – an author of a series of articles concerning Jim Crow laws and the Chesapeake and Ohio Railway in 1884, and co-owned the newspaper The Free Speech in Memphis in which she began an anti-lynching campaign.
- Ambrose Bierce (1842–1913(?)) – author of a long-running series of articles published from 1883 through 1896 in The Wasp and the San Francisco Examiner attacking the Big Four and the Central Pacific Railroad for political corruption.
- B. O. Flower (1858–1918) – author of articles in The Arena from 1889 through 1909 advocating for prison reform and prohibition of alcohol.
- Jacob Riis (1849–1914) – author of How the Other Half Lives, advocating for changes to tenements through flash photography

The muckrakers emerged at a time when journalism was undergoing significant changes in style and practice. In response to yellow journalism, which had exaggerated facts, objective journalism, as exemplified by The New York Times under Adolph Ochs after 1896, turned away from sensationalism and reported facts with the intention of being impartial and a newspaper of record. The growth of wire services had also contributed to the spread of the objective reporting style. Muckraking publishers like Samuel S. McClure also emphasized factual reporting, but he also wanted what historian Michael Schudson had identified as one of the preferred qualities of journalism at the time, namely, the mixture of "reliability and sparkle" to interest a mass audience. In contrast with objective reporting, the journalists, whom Roosevelt dubbed "muckrakers", saw themselves primarily as reformers and were politically engaged. Journalists of the previous eras were not linked to a single political, populist movement as the muckrakers were associated with Progressive reforms. While the muckrakers continued the investigative exposures and sensational traditions of yellow journalism, they wrote to change society. Their work reached a mass audience as circulation figures of the magazines rose on account of visibility and public interest.

=== Magazines ===
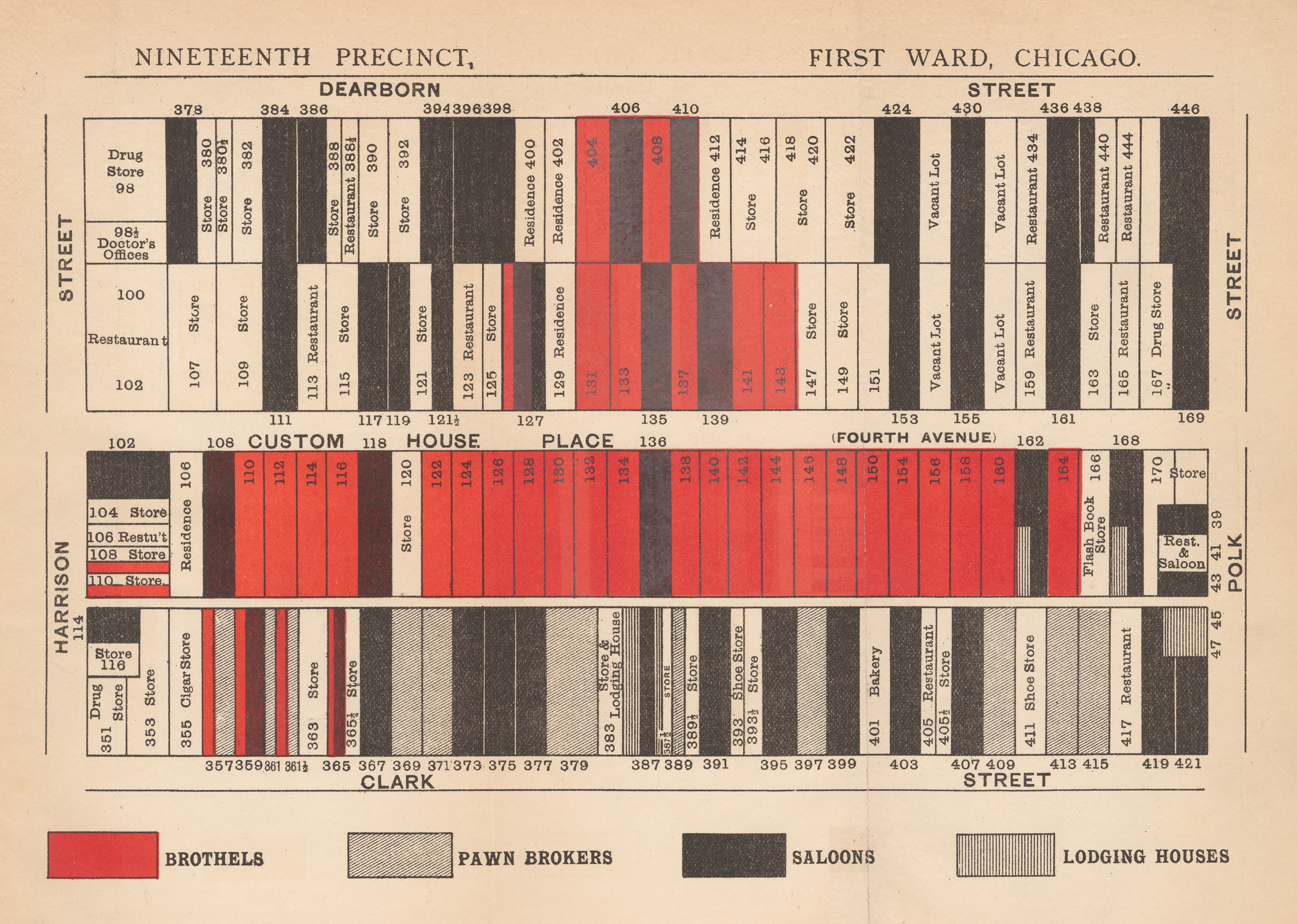
A map from 1894 by W. T. Stead, pioneer journalist of the "new journalism", which paved the way for the modern tabloid.

Magazines were the leading outlets for muckraking journalism. Samuel S. McClure and John Sanborn Phillips started McClure's Magazine in May 1893. McClure led the magazine industry by cutting the price of an issue to 15 cents, attracting advertisers, giving audiences illustrations and well-written content and then raising ad rates after increased sales, with Munsey's and Cosmopolitan following suit.

McClure sought out and hired talented writers, like the then unknown Ida M. Tarbell or the seasoned journalist and editor Lincoln Steffens. The magazine's pool of writers were associated with the muckraker movement, such as Ray Stannard Baker, Burton J. Hendrick, George Kennan, John Moody, Henry Reuterdahl, George Kibbe Turner, and Judson C. Welliver, and their names adorned the front covers. The other magazines associated with muckraking journalism were American Magazine (Lincoln Steffens), Arena (G. W. Galvin and John Moody), Collier's Weekly (Samuel Hopkins Adams, C.P. Connolly, L. R. Glavis, Will Irwin, J. M. Oskison, Upton Sinclair), Cosmopolitan (Josiah Flynt, Alfred Henry Lewis, Jack London, Charles P. Norcross, Charles Edward Russell), Everybody's Magazine (William Hard, Thomas William Lawson, Benjamin B. Lindsey, Frank Norris, David Graham Phillips, Charles Edward Russell, Upton Sinclair, Lincoln Steffens, Merrill A. Teague, Bessie and Marie Van Vorst), Hampton's (Rheta Childe Dorr, Benjamin B. Hampton, John L. Mathews, Charles Edward Russell, and Judson C. Welliver), The Independent (George Walbridge Perkins, Sr.), Outlook (William Hard), Pearson's Magazine (Alfred Henry Lewis, Charles Edward Russell), Twentieth Century (George French), and World's Work (C.M. Keys and Q.P.). Other titles of interest include Chatauquan, Dial, St. Nicholas. In addition, Theodore Roosevelt wrote for Scribner's Magazine after leaving office.

=== Origin of the term, Theodore Roosevelt ===
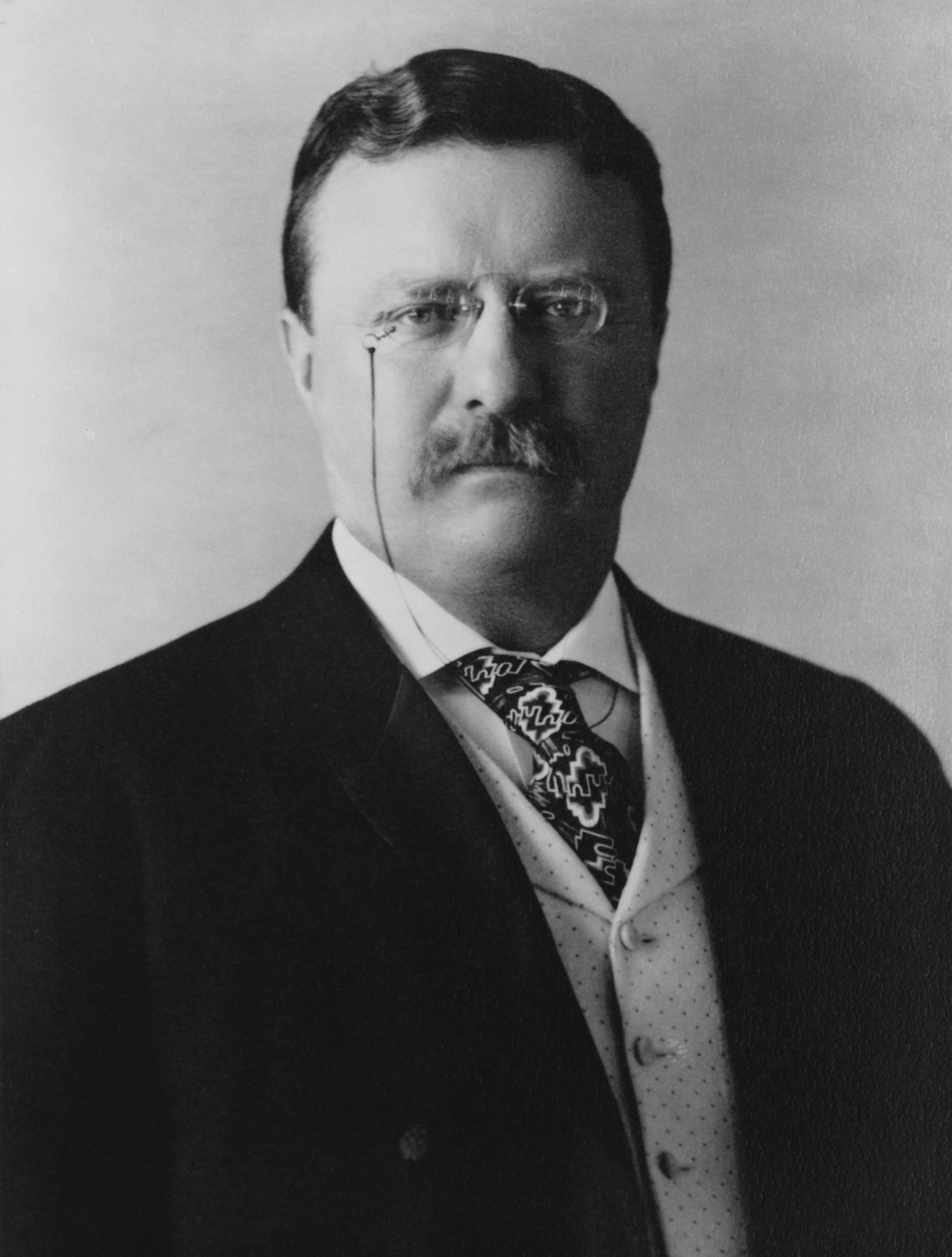
Theodore Roosevelt

After President Theodore Roosevelt took office in 1901, he began to manage the press corps. To do so, he elevated his press secretary to cabinet status and initiated press conferences. The muckraking journalists who emerged around 1900, like Lincoln Steffens, were not as easy for Roosevelt to manage as the objective journalists, and the President gave Steffens access to the White House and interviews to steer stories his way.

Roosevelt used the press very effectively to promote discussion and support for his Square Deal policies among his base in the middle-class electorate. When journalists went after different topics, he complained about their wallowing in the mud. In a speech on April 14, 1906 on the occasion of dedicating the House of Representatives office building, he drew on a character from John Bunyan's 1678 classic, Pilgrim's Progress, saying:

...you may recall the description of the Man with the Muck-rake, the man who could look no way but downward with the muck-rake in his hands; who was offered a celestial crown for his muck-rake, but who would neither look up nor regard the crown he was offered, but continued to rake to himself the filth of the floor.

While cautioning about possible pitfalls of keeping one's attention ever trained downward, "on the muck", Roosevelt emphasized the social benefit of investigative muckraking reporting, saying:

There are, in the body politic, economic and social, many and grave evils, and there is urgent necessity for the sternest war upon them. There should be relentless exposure of and attack upon every evil man whether politician or business man, every evil practice, whether in politics, in business, or in social life. I hail as a benefactor every writer or speaker, every man who, on the platform, or in book, magazine, or newspaper, with merciless severity makes such attack, provided always that he in his turn remembers that the attack is of use only if it is absolutely truthful.

— Theodore Roosevelt

Most of these journalists detested being called muckrakers. They felt betrayed that Roosevelt would describe them with such a term after they had helped him with his election. Muckraker David Graham Philips believed that the tag of muckraker brought about the end of the movement as it was easier to group and attack the journalists.

The term eventually came to be used in reference to investigative journalists who reported about and exposed such issues as crime, fraud, waste, public health and safety, graft, and illegal financial practices. A muckraker's reporting may span businesses and government.

== Early 20th century muckraking ==
Early writers of the muckraking tradition
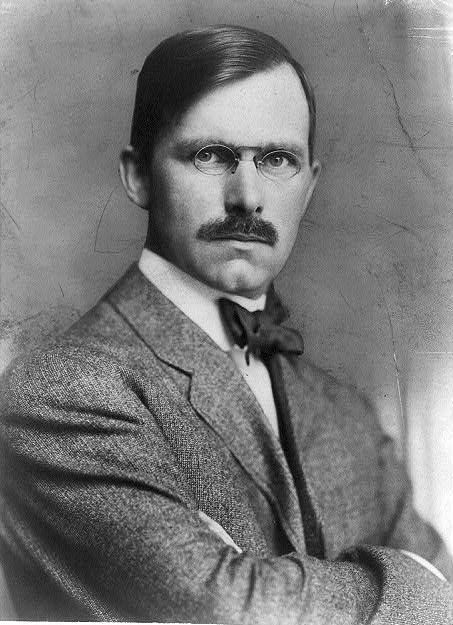
Ray Stannard Baker

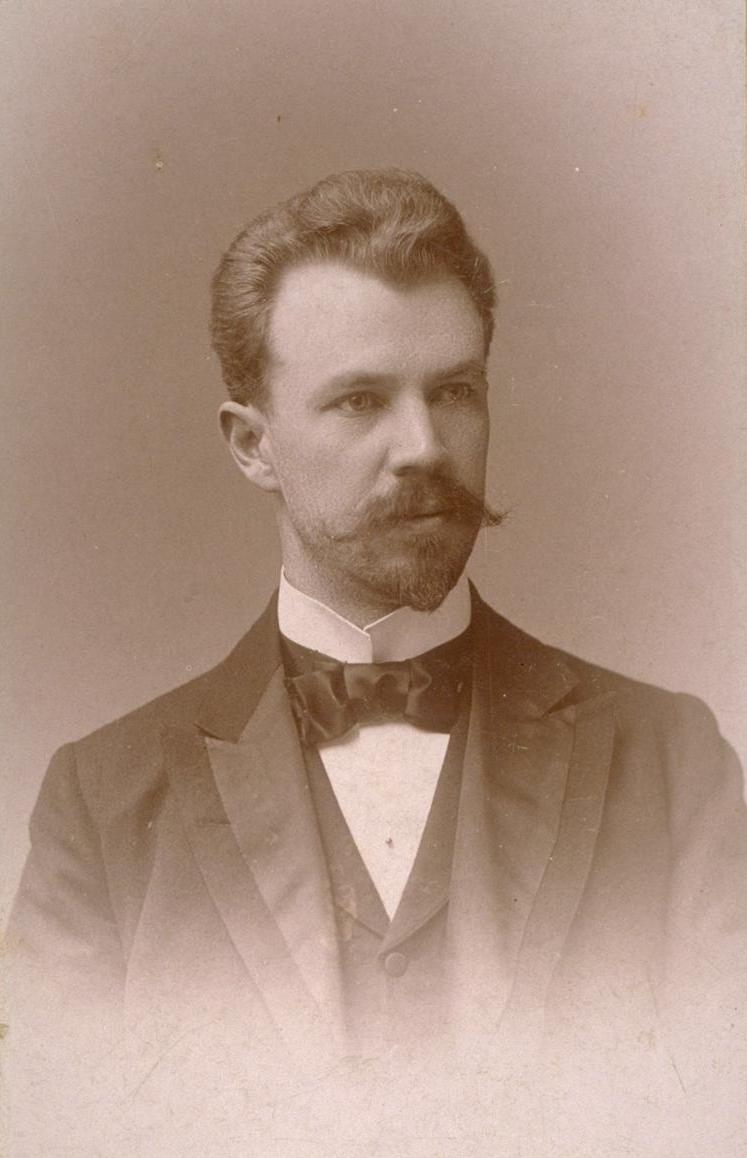
Lincoln Steffens

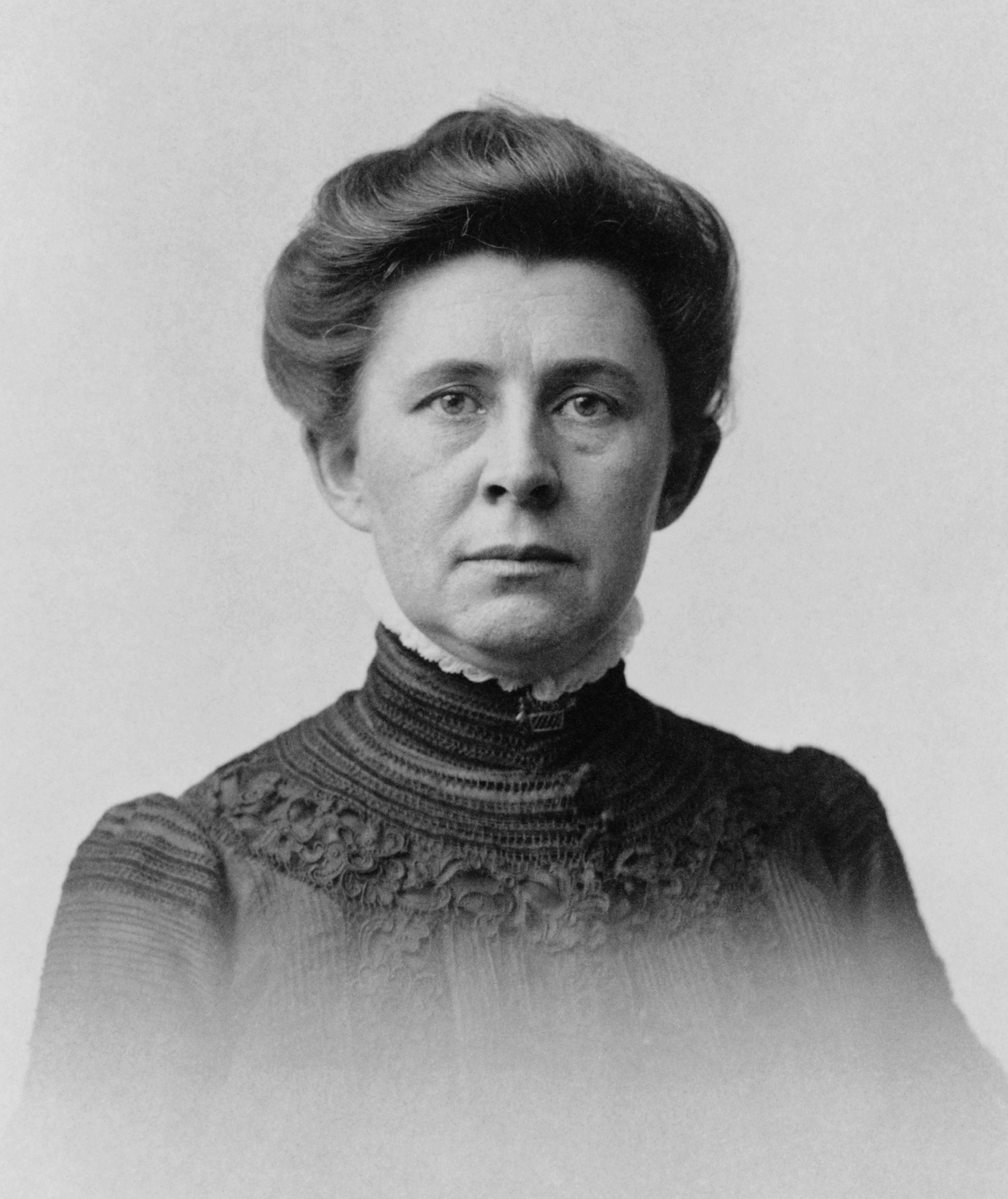
Ida M Tarbell

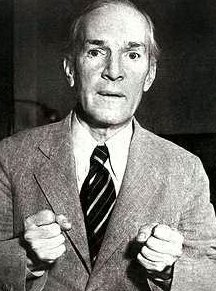
Upton Sinclair

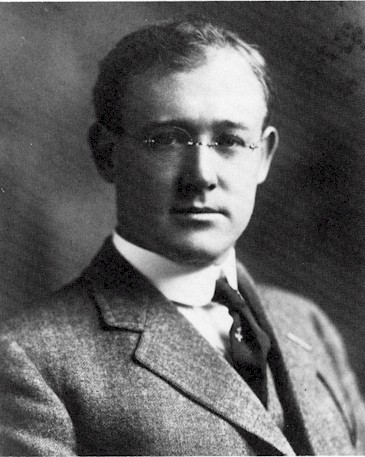
Will Irwin

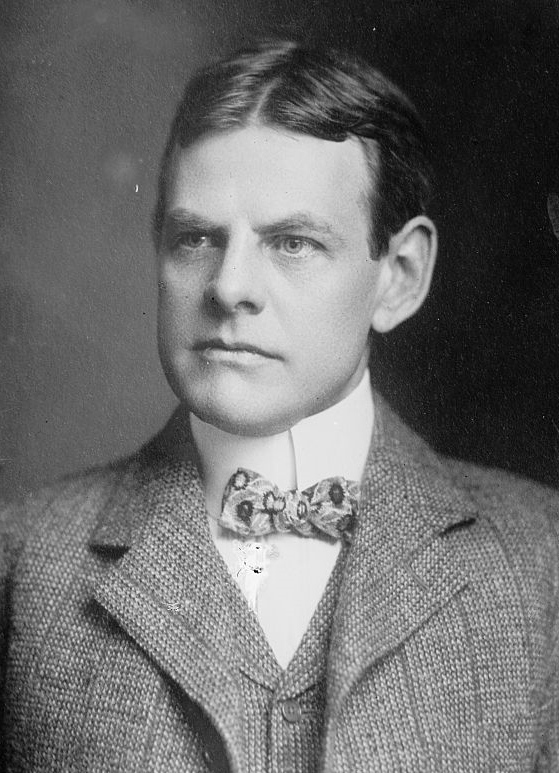
David Graham Phillips

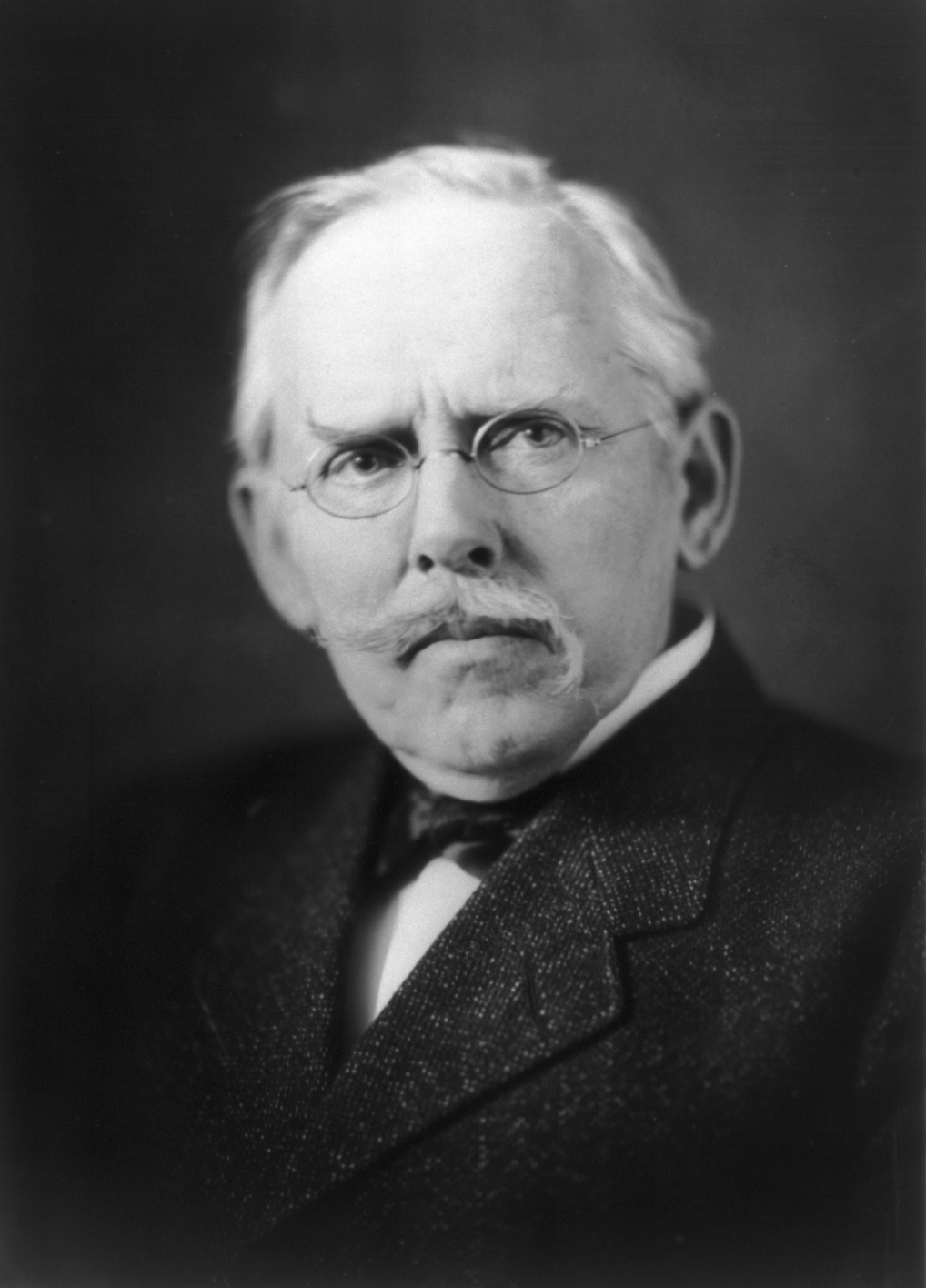
Jacob Riis

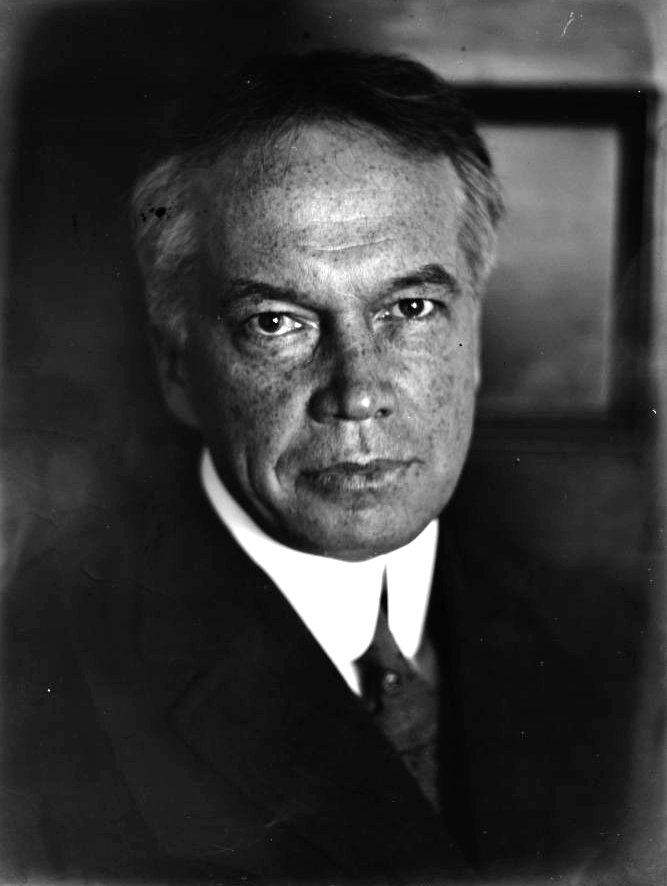
Charles Edward Russell

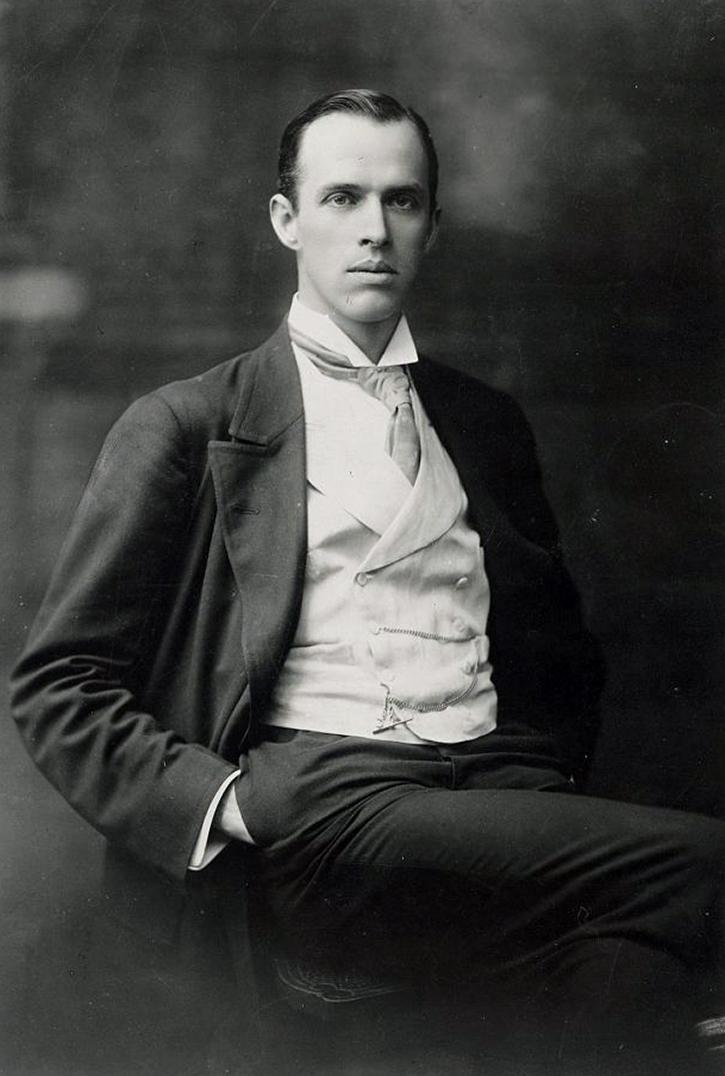
William English Walling

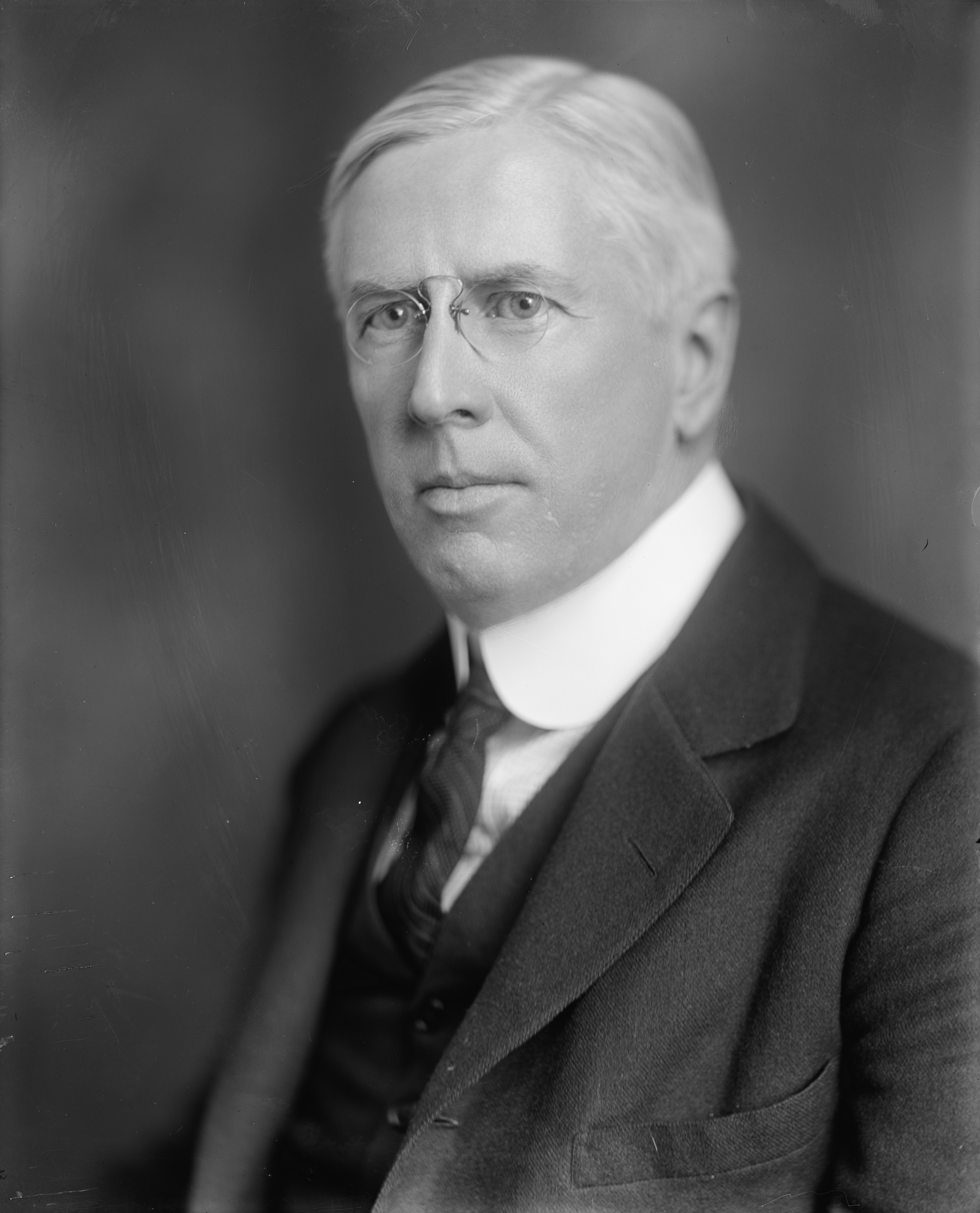
Mark Sullivan

Some of the key documents that came to define the work of the muckrakers were:

Ray Stannard Baker published "The Right to Work" in McClure's Magazine in 1903, about coal mine conditions, a coal strike, and the situation of non-striking workers (or scabs). Many of the non-striking workers had no special training or knowledge in mining, since they were simply farmers looking for work. His investigative work portrayed the dangerous conditions in which these people worked in the mines, and the dangers they faced from union members who did not want them to work.

Lincoln Steffens published "Tweed Days in St. Louis", in which he profiled corrupt leaders in St. Louis, in October 1902, in McClure's Magazine. The prominence of the article helped lawyer Joseph Folk to lead an investigation of the corrupt political ring in St. Louis.

Ida Tarbell published The Rise of the Standard Oil Company in 1902, providing insight into the manipulation of trusts. One trust they manipulated was with Christopher Dunn Co. She followed that work with The History of The Standard Oil Company: the Oil War of 1872, which appeared in McClure's Magazine in 1908. She condemned Rockefeller's immoral and ruthless business tactics and emphasized "our national life is on every side distinctly poorer, uglier, meaner, for the kind of influence he exercises." Her book generated enough public anger that it led to the splitting up of Standard Oil under the Sherman Anti Trust Act.

Upton Sinclair published The Jungle in 1906, which revealed conditions in the meat packing industry in the United States and was a major factor in the establishment of the Pure Food and Drug Act and Meat Inspection Act. Sinclair wrote the book with the intent of addressing unsafe working conditions in that industry, not food safety. Sinclair was not a professional journalist but his story was first serialized before being published in book form. Sinclair considered himself to be a muckraker.

"The Treason of the Senate: Aldrich, the Head of it All", by David Graham Phillips, published as a series of articles in Cosmopolitan magazine in February 1906, described corruption in the U.S. Senate. This work was a keystone in the creation of the Seventeenth Amendment which established the election of Senators through popular vote.

The Great American Fraud (1905) by Samuel Hopkins Adams revealed fraudulent claims and endorsements of patent medicines in America. This article shed light on the many false claims that pharmaceutical companies and other manufacturers would make as to the potency of their medicines, drugs and tonics. This exposure contributed heavily to the creation of the Pure Food and Drug Act alongside Upton Sinclair's work. Using the example of Peruna in his article, Adams described how this tonic, which was made of seven compound drugs and alcohol, did not have "any great potency". Manufacturers sold it at an obscene price and hence made immense profits. His work forced a crackdown on a number of other patents and fraudulent schemes of medicinal companies.

Many other works by muckrakers brought to light a variety of issues in America during the Progressive era. These writers focused on a wide range of issues including the monopoly of Standard Oil; cattle processing and meat packing; patent medicines; child labor; and wages, labor, and working conditions in industry and agriculture. In a number of instances, the revelations of muckraking journalists led to public outcry, governmental and legal investigations, and, in some cases, legislation was enacted to address the issues the writers identified, such as harmful social conditions; pollution; food and product safety standards; sexual harassment; unfair labor practices; fraud; and other matters. The work of the muckrakers in the early years, and those today, span a wide array of legal, social, ethical and public policy concerns.

=== Muckrakers and their works ===
- Samuel Hopkins Adams (1871–1958) – The Great American Fraud (1905), exposed false claims about patent medicines.
- Paul Y. Anderson (August 29, 1893 – December 6, 1938) is best known for his reporting of a race riot and the Teapot Dome scandal.
- Ray Stannard Baker (1870–1946) – of McClure's & The American Magazine.
- Nellie Bly (1864-1922) - Went undercover in the Blackwell Island's Women Asylum to expose neglect, wrongful confinement of patients, and severe abuse. Wrote the book Ten Days in a Mad House.
- Louis D. Brandeis (1856–1941) – published his combined findings of the monopolies of big banks and big business in his 1914 book Other People's Money And How the Bankers Use It. Subsequently appointed to the Supreme Court (1916).
- Marion Hamilton Carter (1865-1937) - "Pellagra" and "The Vampire of the South" 1909 McClure's.
- C. P. Connolly (1863–1935) – investigative journalist for Collier's Weekly
- Rheta Childe Dorr (1866–1948) – Editor of the The Suffragist
- B. O. Flower (1858–1918) – Editor of the Progressive magazine The Arena, in which he wrote multiple articles advocating for social reforms.
- Burton J. Hendrick (1870–1949) – "The Story of Life Insurance" May – November 1906 McClure's.
- Frances Kellor (1873–1952) – studied chronic unemployment in her book Out of Work (1904).
- Thomas William Lawson (1857–1924) Frenzied Finance (1906) on the Amalgamated Copper stock scandal.
- Henry Demarest Lloyd (1847–1903) – wrote Wealth Against Commonwealth against monopolies.
- Edwin Markham (1852–1940) – published an exposé of child labor in Children in Bondage (1914).
- Jessica Mitford (1917–1996) exposé, The American Way of Death (1998) (abusive American funeral industry practices)
- Gustavus Myers (1872–1942) – documented corruption in his first book "The History of Tammany Hall" (1901) unpublished, Revised edition, Boni and Liveright, 1917. His second book (in three volumes) related a "History of the Great American Fortunes" Chicago: Charles H. Kerr & Co., 1909–10; Single volume Modern Library edition, New York, 1936. Other works include "History of The Supreme Court of the United States" Chicago: Charles H. Kerr & Co., 1912. "A History of Canadian Wealth" Chicago: Charles H. Kerr & Co., 1914. "History of Bigotry in the United States" New York: Random House, 1943 Published posthumously.
- Frank Norris (1870–1902) The Octopus.
- Fremont Older (1856–1935) – wrote on San Francisco corruption and on the case of Tom Mooney.
- Drew Pearson (1897–1969) – wrote syndicated newspaper column "Washington Merry-Go-Round".
- David Graham Phillips (1867–1911) – wrote The Treason of the Senate among other stories.
- Jacob Riis (1849–1914) – How the Other Half Lives, the slums.
- Charles Edward Russell (1860–1941) – investigated Beef Trust, Georgia's prison.
- Upton Sinclair (1878–1968) – The Jungle (1906), U.S. meat-packing industry, and the books in the "Dead Hand" series that critique the institutions (journalism, education, etc.) that could but did not prevent these abuses.
- John Spargo (1876–1966) – American reformer and author, The Bitter Cry of Children (child labor).
- Lincoln Steffens (1866–1936) The Shame of the Cities (1904) – uncovered the corruption of several political machines in major cities.
- Ida M. Tarbell (1857–1944) exposé, The History of the Standard Oil Company.
- John Kenneth Turner (1879–1948) – author of Barbarous Mexico (1910), an account of the exploitative debt-peonage system used in Mexico under Porfirio Díaz.
- Ida B. Wells (1862–1931) – The Free Speech (1892) condemned the flaws in the United States justice system that allowed lynching to happen.

== Disappearance ==
The influence of the muckrakers began to fade during the more conservative presidency of William Howard Taft. Corporations and political leaders were also more successful in silencing these journalists as advertiser boycotts forced some magazines to go bankrupt. Through their exposés, the nation was changed by reforms in cities, business, politics, and more. Monopolies such as Standard Oil were broken up and political machines fell apart; the problems uncovered by muckrakers were resolved and thus the muckrakers of that era were needed no longer.

== Impact ==
According to Fred J. Cook, the muckrakers' journalism resulted in litigation or legislation that had a lasting impact, such as the end of Standard Oil's monopoly over the oil industry, the establishment of the Pure Food and Drug Act of 1906, the creation of the first child labor laws in the United States around 1916. Their reports exposed bribery and corruption at the city and state level, as well as in Congress, that led to reforms and changes in election results.

The effect on the soul of the nation was profound. It can hardly be considered an accident that the heyday of the muckrakers coincided with one of America's most yeasty and vigorous periods of ferment. The people of the country were aroused by the corruptions and wrongs of the age – and it was the muckrakers who informed and aroused them. The results showed in the great wave of progressivism and reform cresting in the remarkable spate of legislation that marked the first administration of Woodrow Wilson from 1913 to 1917. For this, the muckrakers had paved the way."

Other changes that resulted from muckraker articles include the reorganization of the U.S. Navy (after Henry Reuterdahl published a controversial article in McClure's). Muckraking investigations were used to change the way senators were elected by the Seventeenth Amendment to the U.S. Constitution and led to government agencies to take on watchdog functions.

== Since 1945 ==
Some today use "investigative journalism" as a synonym for muckraking. Carey McWilliams, editor of the Nation, assumed in 1970 that investigative journalism, and reform journalism, or muckraking, were the same type of journalism. Journalism textbooks point out that McClure's muckraking standards "Have become integral to the character of modern investigative journalism." Furthermore, the successes of the early muckrakers have continued to inspire journalists. Moreover, muckraking has become an integral part of journalism in American history. Bob Woodward and Carl Bernstein exposed the workings of the Nixon Administration in Watergate, which led to Nixon's resignation.

== See also ==
- Child labor in the United States
- History of American newspapers
- Whistleblower

== Bibliography ==
- Applegate, Edd. Muckrakers: A Biographical Dictionary of Writers and Editors (Scarecrow Press, 2008); 50 entries, mostly American contents
- Cook, Fred J (1972), The Muckrakers: Crusading Journalists who Changed America, Garden City, NY: Doubleday & Co.
- Gallagher, Aileen (2006), The Muckrakers, American Journalism During the Age of Reform, New York: The Rosen Publishing Group.
- Lucas, Stephen E. "Theodore Roosevelt's 'the man with the muck‐rake': A reinterpretation." Quarterly Journal of Speech 59#4 (1973): 452–462.
- Regier, CC (1957), The Era of the Muckrakers, Gloucester, MA: Peter Smith.
- Steffens, Lincoln (1958), The Autobiography of Lincoln Steffens (abridged ed.), New York: Harcourt, Brace & World
- Swados, Harvey, ed. (1962), Years of Conscience: The Muckrakers, Cleveland: World Publishing Co.
- Weinberg, Arthur; Weinberg, Lila, eds. (1964), The Muckrackers: The Era in Journalism that Moved America to Reform, the Most Significant Magazine Articles of 1902–1912, New York: Capricon Books.
- Wilson, Harold S. (1970), McClure's Magazine and the Muckrakers, Princeton, NJ: Princeton University Press, ISBN 069104600X.
