= On the Gulls' Road =

1908 short story by Willa Cather

- Short story by Willa Cather

Text available at Wikisource
- Country: United States
- Language: English
- Genre: Short story

Publication
- Published in: McClure's
- Publication type: Magazine
- Publication date: December 1908

"On the Gulls' Road" is a short story by Willa Cather. It was first published in McClure's in December 1908.

== Plot summary ==
Another painter visits the narrator and he is mesmerised by his painting of Alexandra Ebbling. The narrator then thinks back to how they met her, on a ship from Genoa to New York City, after living in Rome for work for two years. They start talking, stop in Naples for a day, then sail by Sardinia. They move on to doing a portrait of her, and they give her a bunch of magnolias they got in Gibraltar and she talks about her ailment for the first time. Two days later when they see her husband neglects her just before going to a concert on the ship, they go and tell her they should run away together because they love each other. She explains she can't because she is ill. She gives them a box that they shall only open sometime later, when she tells them to by letter. She then takes a ship back to her father's in Norway without her husband. The following March, they receive a letter from him saying she has died. There is also a letter from her, telling them he can open the box now. Inside, there is a magnolia, strands of her hair, and two pink shells.

== Characters ==
- The narrator
- Another painter
- Mrs Alexandra Ebbling. She is Norwegian and lived in Naples for a year with her first husband.
- Mr Lars Ebbling, Alexandra's husband. He is Norwegian too.
- Carin, the Ebblings's daughter.
- The Doctor, 'an Italian naval officer, and the commodore of a Long Island yacht club.'
- Dame Ericson, a woman who used to live in Alexandra's village.
- Niels Nannestad, Alexandra's father.

== Allusions to other works ==
- Rembrandt is mentioned.

== Literary significance and criticism ==
- Sarah Orne Jewett raised the question of the narrator's gender, suggesting that a female narrator might have been better. The gender of the narrator is never explicitly clarified by the author.
