= S. S. McClure =

American publisher (1857–1949)

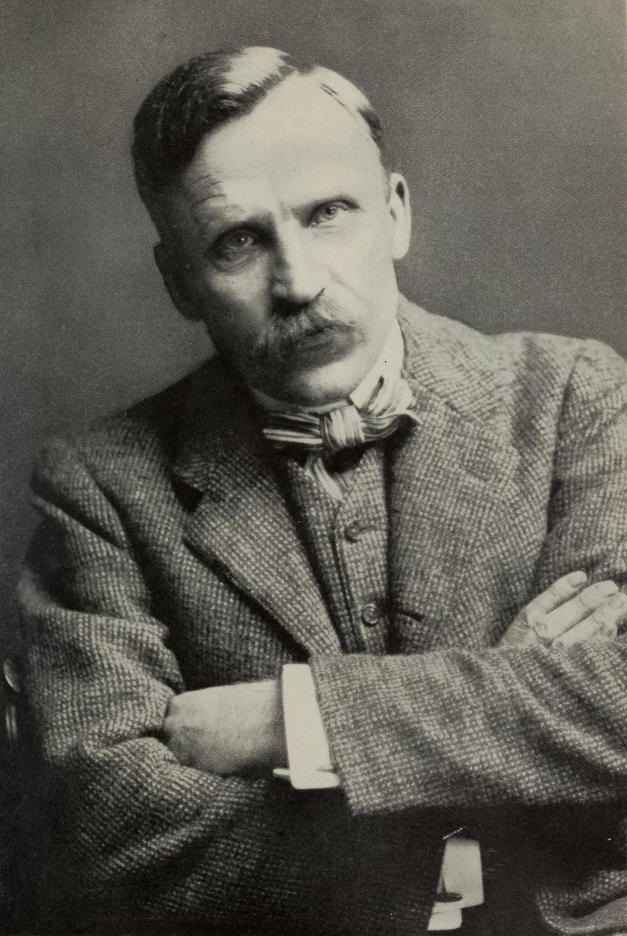
- S. S. McClure (c. 1903)
- Born: Samuel Sidney McClure; February 17, 1857; County Antrim, Ireland
- Died: March 21, 1949 (aged 92); New York City
- Education: Knox College
- Occupations: Investigative journalist, publisher, editor
- Spouse: Harriet Hurd (m. 1883; died 1929)

Samuel Sidney McClure (February 17, 1857 – March 21, 1949) was an Irish-American publisher who became known as a key figure in investigative, or muckraking, journalism. He co-founded and ran McClure's Magazine from 1893 to 1911, which ran numerous exposées of wrongdoing in business and politics, such as those written by Ida Tarbell, Ray Stannard Baker, and Lincoln Steffens. The magazine ran fiction and nonfiction by the leading writers of the day, including Sarah Orne Jewett, Mark Twain, William Dean Howells, Joel Chandler Harris, Jack London, Stephen Crane, William Allen White and Willa Cather.

== Biography ==
He was born to Thomas and Elizabeth McClure, an Ulster Scots couple in County Antrim in what is now Northern Ireland. Young McClure immigrated to Indiana with his mother and brothers when he was nine years old following the untimely death of his father due to a work-related injury. Two brothers and a sister of Elizabeth had previously settled in Indiana. Following a period of housing instability, Elizabeth married Thomas Simpson, a struggling farmer, to secure them shelter.

McClure grew up in near poverty on this farm before attending Valparaiso City Public Graded School from 1871 to 1873. Beginning in September, 1874, he worked his way through Knox Academy and then Knox College, graduating second in the class of 1881 after having served as editor-in-chief of the student newspaper his senior year. While at Knox, McClure met and befriended his future business associates, John Sanborn Phillips and Albert Brady, and his future wife, Harriet Hurd.

Following college graduation, McClure ended up in Boston after being rejected by Hurd over objections of her father, Knox College professor Albert Hurd. In Boston, McClure ingratiated himself with Colonel Albert Pope of the Pope Manufacturing Company, the maker of the Columbia, the first U.S.-made bicycle, Pope having previously taken out advertising in the Knox student newspaper. Pope first hired McClure to take charge of the bicycle rink, teaching would-be customers how to ride. When the Colonel expressed an interest in publishing a bicycle-themed magazine, however, McClure jumped at the opportunity. Phillips joined him as co-editor of the monthly Wheelman, "an illustrated magazine of cycling literature and news."

After a time, McClure reconciled with Hurd after she admitted to rejecting him only to appease her father. They married in September, 1883. An offer for McClure to be an editorial assistant with The Century Magazine brought the newlyweds to New York that December.

The following summer of 1884, McClure established the McClure Syndicate, the first U.S. newspaper syndicate, and published in Sunday newspapers, containing serials of books, recipes and reviews.

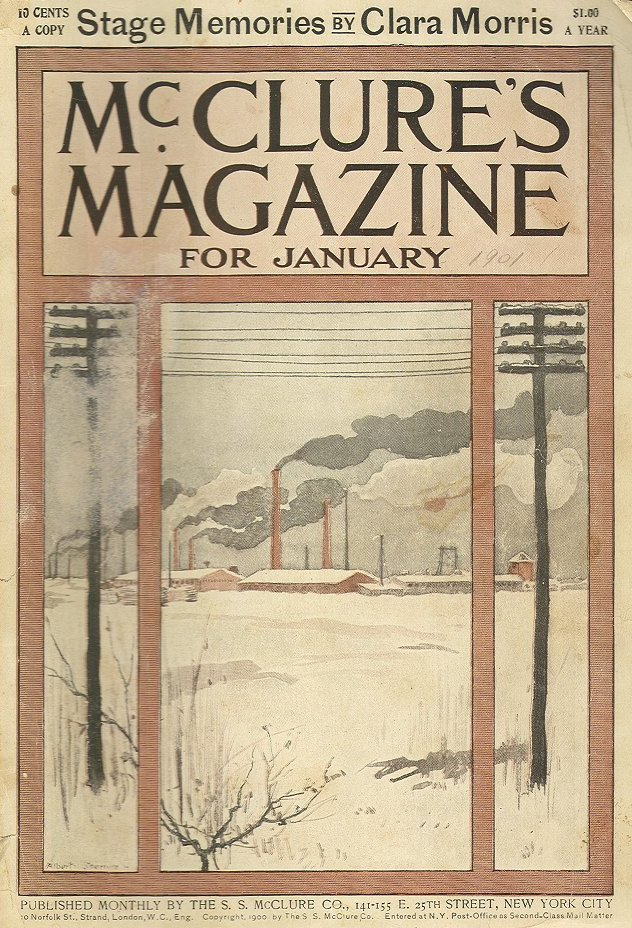
Cover of January 1901 issue of McClure's Magazine

He founded McClure's Magazine in 1893 and ran it successfully until 1911 when poor health and financial reorganization forced him out (and many of his writers had defected to form their own magazine). McClure's Magazine published influential pieces by respected journalists and authors including Jack London, Ida Tarbell, Upton Sinclair, Burton J. Hendrick, Rudyard Kipling, Sir Arthur Conan Doyle, Robert Louis Stevenson, Willa Cather, and Lincoln Steffens. Through his magazine, he introduced Dr. Maria Montessori's new teaching methods to North America in 1911.

McClure was a business partner of Frank Nelson Doubleday in Doubleday & McClure, ancestor to today's Doubleday imprint. After McClure left Doubleday, he established the publisher McClure, Phillips and Company with John Sanborn Phillips. Phillips left to purchase The American Magazine in 1906 and McClure sold his book publishing operations to Doubleday, Page in 1908. After he was ousted in 1911, McClure's Magazine serialized his autobiography, ghost-written by one of the magazine's editors, Willa Cather.

McClure is credited with creating a new strategy for compensating journalists that is still used now. Instead of expecting writers to provide his newspaper with articles on a strictly consistent basis, he gave them as much time as needed to spend on researching for the relevant topics.

Rudyard Kipling was one writer who rejected McClure's offer of a long-term contract, quoting as justification Ecclesiasticus (Chapt. 33, verse 21): "As long as thou livest and hast breath in thee, give not thyself over to any". Kipling was also present when McClure began to contemplate the launch of a new literary magazine. He recalled in his autobiography:

He entered [my home in Vermont], alight with the notion for a new Magazine to be called 'McClure's.' I think the talk lasted some twelve—or it may have been seventeen—hours, before the notion was fully hatched out.

He died in New York City in 1949, at the age of 92. He is buried next to his wife Harriet at Hope Cemetery in Galesburg, Illinois.

== Legacy ==
According to his biographer Peter Lyon, McClure was, "one of the greatest instinctive editors ever to function in the US, and one of the most wretched businessmen." Lyon suggests that he had a manic-depressive personality, combining enthusiasm, tenacity, and a remarkable talent for predicting public responses. He favored Western writers, and especially muckraking articles that made his magazine famous. On the other hand, he was unstable with a hair-trigger impatience that alienated many staffers. Always in the red, he sold first his book publishing house, then his nationwide newspaper syndicate, and finally his own magazine.
