= Harper's Magazine =

American monthly magazine

- Cover of the December 2024 issue
- Editor: Christopher Carroll
- President: John R. MacArthur
- Categories: Art, culture, literature
- Frequency: Monthly
- Total circulation: 104,882 (2018)
- First issue: June 1850; 176 years ago (as Harper's New Monthly Magazine); New York City
- Company: Harper's Magazine Foundation
- Country: United States
- Based in: 666 Broadway, New York City, New York, U.S.
- Language: English
- Website: harpers.org
- ISSN: 0017-789X

Harper's Magazine is a monthly magazine of literature, politics, culture, finance, and the arts. Launched in New York City in June 1850, it is the oldest continuously published monthly magazine in the United States. (Note: While Scientific American, founded in 1845, is older, it did not become monthly until 1921.) Harper's Magazine has won 22 National Magazine Awards.

The magazine has published works of prominent authors and political figures, including Herman Melville, Woodrow Wilson, and Winston Churchill. Willie Morris's resignation as editor in 1971 was considered a major event, and many other employees of the magazine resigned with him. The magazine has developed into the 21st century, adding several blogs. It is related under the same original publisher (Harper) to Harper's Bazaar magazine, focused on fashion, and several other "Harper's" titles but each publication is independently produced. Although it shares historical ties to the publishing house Harper, it is not currently affiliated as it merged with William Collins, Sons to become HarperCollins.

According to a 2012 Pew Research Center study, Harper's Magazine, along with The Atlantic, and The New Yorker, ranked highest in college-educated readership among major American media outlets.

== History ==
=== 19th century ===
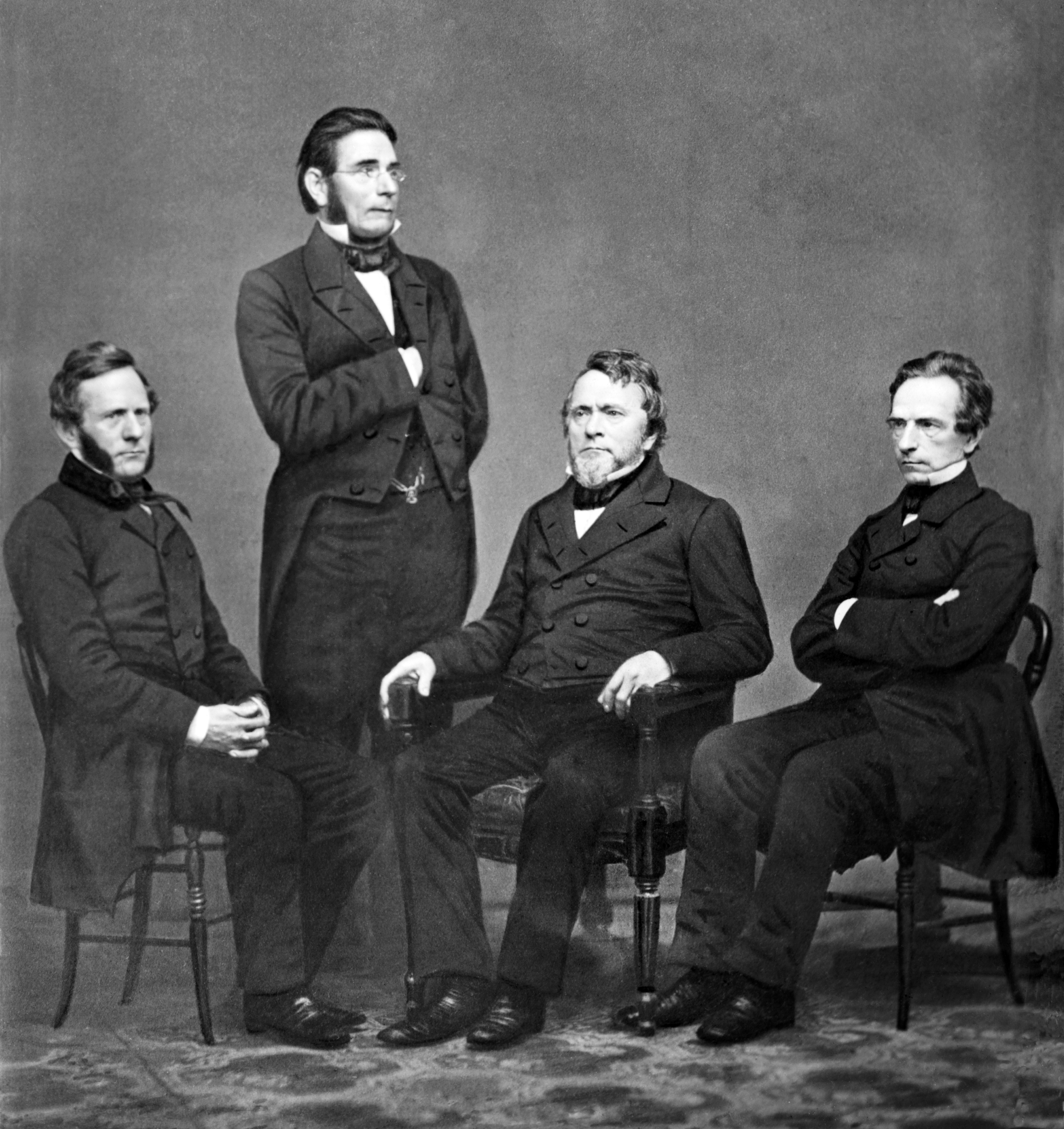
Harper & Brothers founders in New York City by Fletcher, James, John, and Joseph Wesley Harper (1860)

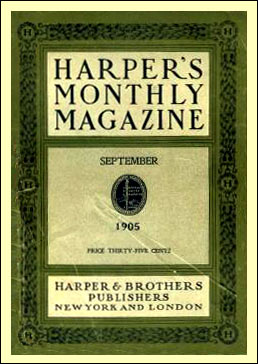
A 1905 issue of Harper's

Harper's Magazine began as Harper's New Monthly Magazine in New York City in June 1850, by publisher Harper & Brothers. The company also founded the magazines Harper's Weekly and Harper's Bazaar, and grew to become HarperCollins. The first press run of Harper's Magazine included 7,500 copies and sold out almost immediately. Six months later, the magazine's circulation had grown to 50,000.

The early issues reprinted material pirated from English authors such as Charles Dickens, William Makepeace Thackeray, and the Brontë sisters. The magazine soon was publishing the work of American artists and writers, and in time commentary by the likes of Winston Churchill and Woodrow Wilson. Portions of Herman Melville's novel Moby-Dick were first published in the October 1851 issue of Harper's under the title, "The Town-Ho's Story", named after Chapter 54 of Moby-Dick.

=== 20th century ===
The magazine changed its name to Harper's Monthly Magazine in 1901, and simplified it again in 1912, to Harper's Magazine.

In 1962, Harper & Brothers merged with Row, Peterson & Company, becoming Harper & Row (now HarperCollins). In 1965, the magazine was separately incorporated, and became a division of the Minneapolis Star and Tribune Company, owned by the Cowles Media Company.

In the 1970s, Harper's Magazine published Seymour Hersh's reporting of the My Lai massacre by United States forces in Vietnam. In 1971, editor Willie Morris resigned under pressure from owner John Cowles Jr., prompting resignations from many of the magazine's star contributors and staffers, including Norman Mailer, David Halberstam, Robert Kotlowitz, Marshall Frady, and Larry L. King:

Morris's departure jolted the literary world. Mailer, William Styron, Gay Talese, Bill Moyers, and Tom Wicker declared that they would boycott Harper's as long as the Cowles family owned it, and the four staff writers hired by Morris—Frady among them—resigned in solidarity with him.

— Scott Sherman

Robert Shnayerson, a senior editor at Time magazine, was hired to replace Morris as Harper's ninth editor, serving in that position from 1971 until 1976.

Lewis H. Lapham served as managing editor from 1976 until 1981, when the job was taken over by Michael Kinsley. Lapham returned to the position again from 1983 until 2006. On June 17, 1980, the Star Tribune announced it would cease publishing Harper's Magazine after the August 1980 issue, but on July 9, 1980, John R. MacArthur (who goes by the name Rick) and his father, Roderick, obtained pledges from the directorial boards of the John D. and Catherine T. MacArthur Foundation, the Atlantic Richfield Company, and CEO Robert Orville Anderson to amass the $1.5 million needed to establish the Harper's Magazine Foundation. It now publishes the magazine.

In 1984, Lapham and MacArthur, now publisher and president of the foundation, respectively, along with new executive editor Michael Pollan, redesigned Harper's and introduced the "Harper's Index" with statistics derived from current events, "Readings", and the "Annotation" departments to complement its fiction, essays, reportage, and reviews.

=== 21st century ===
Under the Lapham and MacArthur's leadership, Harper's Magazine continued publishing literary fiction by John Updike, George Saunders, and others. Politically, Harper's has been a vocal critic of U.S. domestic and foreign policies. Editor Lapham's monthly "Notebook" columns have lambasted the Clinton and the George W. Bush administrations. Beginning in 2003, the magazine concentrated on reporting about the Iraq War, including long articles on the battle for Fallujah, and the cronyism of the American reconstruction of Iraq. Other reporting has covered abortion issues, cloning, and global warming.

The magazine publishes a newsletter, featuring a rotating set of authors, called the "Weekly Review", a three-paragraph distillation of the week's political, scientific, and bizarre news. Like "Harper's Index" and "Findings" in the print edition of the magazine, "Weekly Review" items are typically arranged for ironic contrast.

As of the November 2025 issue, Dan Piepenbring writes the print edition's "New Books" column.

== Controversies ==
=== Homophobia ===
In September 1970, the magazine featured on its cover "Homo/Hetero: The Struggle for Sexual Identity," an essay written by Joseph Epstein, who expressed his negative views of homosexuality and compared it to being "condemned to a state of permanent niggerdom among men." He also wrote: "If I had the power to do so, I would wish homosexuality off the face of this earth. I would do so because I think it brings infinitely more pain than pleasure to those who are forced to live with it; because I think there is no resolution for this pain in our lifetime, only, for the majority of homosexuals, more pain and various degrees of exacerbating adjustment; and because, wholly selfishly, I find myself completely incapable of coming to terms with it…." In response, the Gay Activists Alliance (GAA) submitted three articles which Harper's refused to consider. GAA then planned a zap for October 27, 1970, which was covered by ABC-TV and WNEW-TV, and led to a three-part series on gay liberation by WOR-TV. When GAA member Arthur Evans confronted editor Midge Decter for publishing the essay, she denied that there was any anti-gay prejudice (Decter later contributed her own homophobic writing, "The Boys on the Beach," to her husband Norman Podhoretz's conservative magazine Commentary, which prompted Gore Vidal's "Some Jews & The Gays"). Merle Miller, a former editor at Harper's, in the wake of "Homo/Hetero," came out publicly and wrote his own article, now considered a landmark of American journalism, "What It Means to Be a Homosexual" published in the New York Times Sunday Magazine on January 17, 1971. "I am sick and tired," he said of the article, "of reading and hearing such goddamn demeaning, degrading bullshit about me and my friends."

=== Open casket photo ===
The August 2004 issue contained a photo essay by photojournalist Peter Turnley. The eight-page spread in August 2004 showed images of death, grieving, and funerals from both sides of the war in Afghanistan. On the U.S. side, Turnley visited the funeral of an Oklahoma National Guard member, Spc. Kyle Brinlee, 21, who was killed when his vehicle ran over an improvised explosive device (IED) in Afghanistan. During his funeral, Turnley photographed the open casket as it lay in the back of the high school auditorium where the funeral was held to accommodate 1,200 mourners, and the photo was used in the photo essay. Brinlee's family subsequently sued the magazine in federal court. The case ended in 2007 when the U.S. Supreme Court ruled that the unauthorized publication was in "poor taste" but upheld the ruling of the Tenth Circuit that the magazine had not violated the privacy rights of the family, since the family had invited the press and, according the court, "opened up the funeral scene to the public eye".

=== Short-termed editors ===
In 2006, Lapham was succeeded as Harper's editor by Roger Hodge. Since that time, the magazine has had a number of shorter-termed editors in chief, several of whom were fired amid various controversies. On January 25, 2010, the firing of the magazine's editor, Roger Hodge, by publisher John R. MacArthur was met with criticism among the magazine's subscribers and staff. MacArthur initially claimed Hodge was stepping down for "personal reasons", but later disclosed that he fired Hodge. Ellen Rosenbush served as editor from 2010 to 2015. She returned in January 2016 when MacArthur fired Christopher Cox, who had been named editor only three months prior in October 2015. James Marcus assumed the post of editor in 2016.

=== Katie Roiphe essay on #MeToo ===
In March 2018, an essay by Katie Roiphe on the #MeToo movement excited controversy both online and inside Harper's. Marcus had complained about the piece, suggesting the critique of #MeToo was inappropriate in light of Harper's "longtime reputation as a gentleman's smoking club"; he attributed this disagreement as a primary cause of his firing in 2018. In April 2018, Ellen Rosenbush assumed the title of editorial director. In October 2019, the magazine announced that novelist and essayist Christopher Beha would be taking over as editor, with Rosenbush remaining as editor-at-large.

=== Letter on Justice and Open Debate ===
In July 2020, Harper's published an open letter called "A Letter on Justice and Open Debate" criticizing "illiberalism" and promoting a tolerance of different viewpoints. The letter received a mixed response on Twitter with some remarking that the prominent signatories had "bigger platforms and more resources than most other humans" and were unlikely to face repercussions for anything they said, and others taking umbrage at particular signatories such as J. K. Rowling, who faced criticism for her comments on transgender issues.

== Notable contributors ==
- Horatio Alger
- Frederic H. Balfour
- Wendell Berry
- John Dickson Carr
- John R. Chapin
- Noam Chomsky
- Winston Churchill
- Florence Earle Coates
- Alexander Cockburn
- Diane Cook
- Rebecca Curtis
- Roald Dahl
- Bernard DeVoto
- Stephen A. Douglas
- Theodore Dreiser
- Irwin Edman
- Barbara Ehrenreich
- Ralph Ellison
- Sol Eytinge Jr.
- Lucine Finch
- Thomas Frank
- Jonathan Franzen
- Robert Frost
- Barbara Garson
- John Taylor Gatto
- Horace Greeley
- G. Stanley Hall
- Barbara Grizzuti Harrison
- Seymour Hersh
- Christopher Hitchens
- Edward Hoagland
- Richard Hofstadter
- Winslow Homer
- Jim Hougan
- Irving Howe
- William Dean Howells
- Henry James
- Naomi Klein
- Ben Lerner
- Jack London
- Fitz Hugh Ludlow
- Norman Mailer
- Herman Melville
- Stanley Milgram
- John Stuart Mill
- Hamilton Morris
- John Muir
- Thomas Nast
- Albert Jay Nock
- Joyce Carol Oates
- Cynthia Ozick
- Kevin Phillips
- Marjorie Pickthall
- Sylvia Plath
- Michael Pollan
- M. E. Ravage
- Frederic Remington
- Marilynne Robinson
- Richard Rodriguez
- Theodore Roosevelt
- Philip Roth
- J. D. Salinger
- George Saunders
- Miranda July
- David Samuels
- Herman George Scheffauer
- Isaac Bashevis Singer
- Jane Smiley
- Zadie Smith
- Rebecca Solnit
- Terry Southern
- John Steinbeck
- Henry L. Stimson
- Alfred Thomas Story
- Susan Straight
- John Jeremiah Sullivan
- Barrett Swanson
- Booth Tarkington
- Sara Teasdale
- Hunter S. Thompson
- Leon Trotsky
- Mark Twain
- John Updike
- Kurt Vonnegut
- William T. Vollmann
- Adelaide Cilley Waldron
- David Foster Wallace
- H. G. Wells
- E. B. White
- Woodrow Wilson
- Owen Wister
- Tom Wolfe
- Howard Zinn
- Slavoj Žižek

== Gallery ==
Posters by Edward Penfield

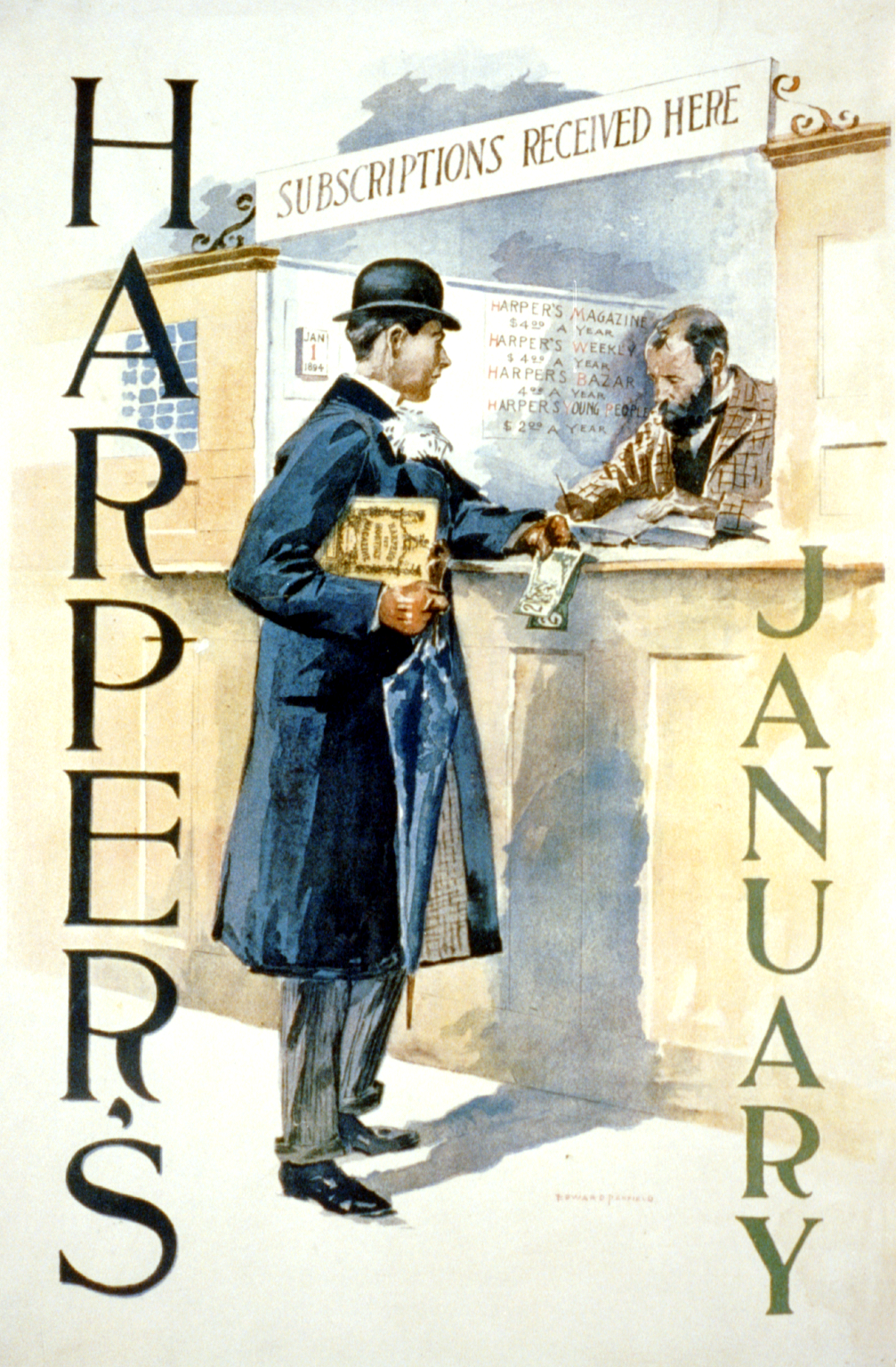
January 1894

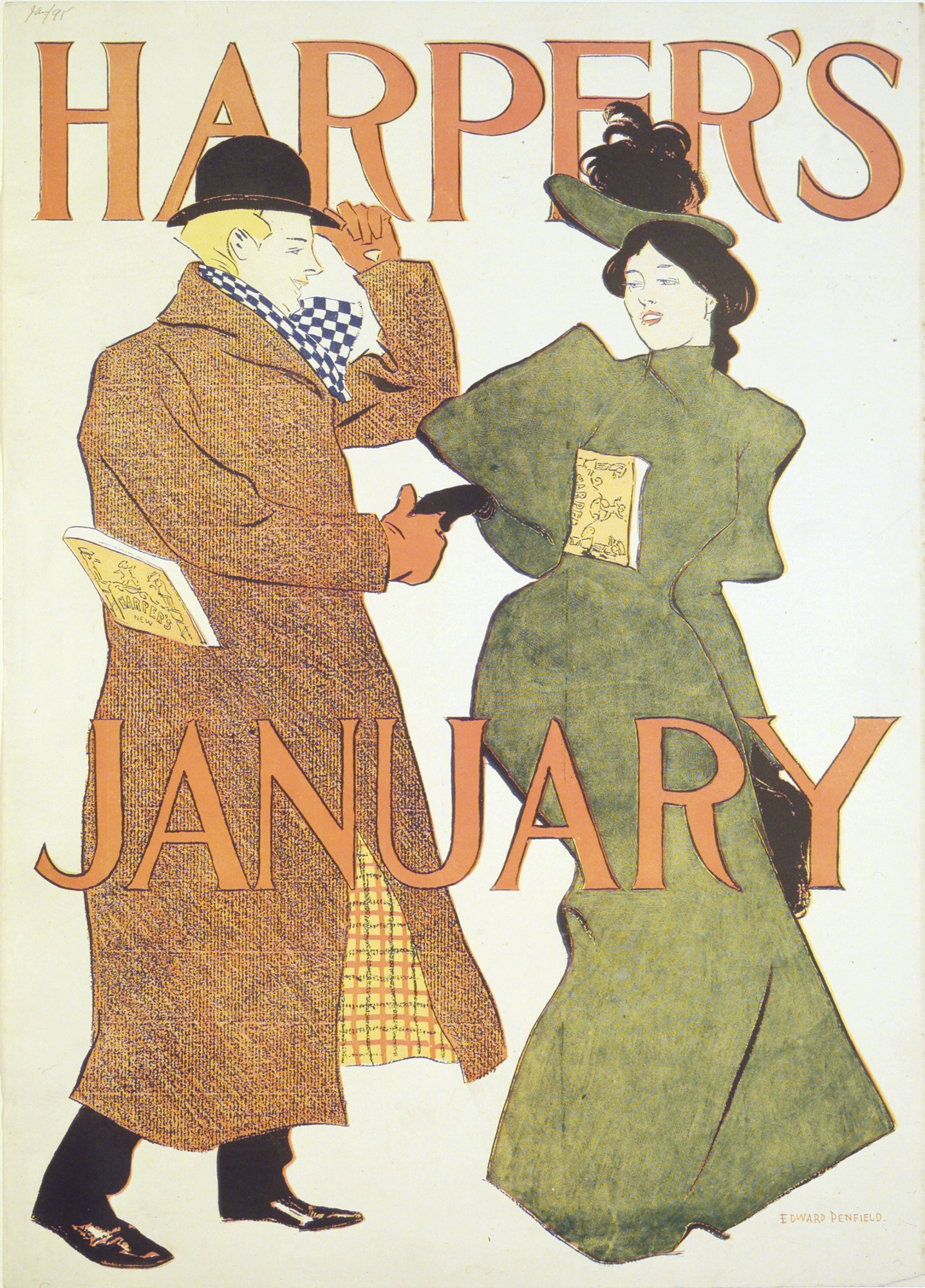
January 1895

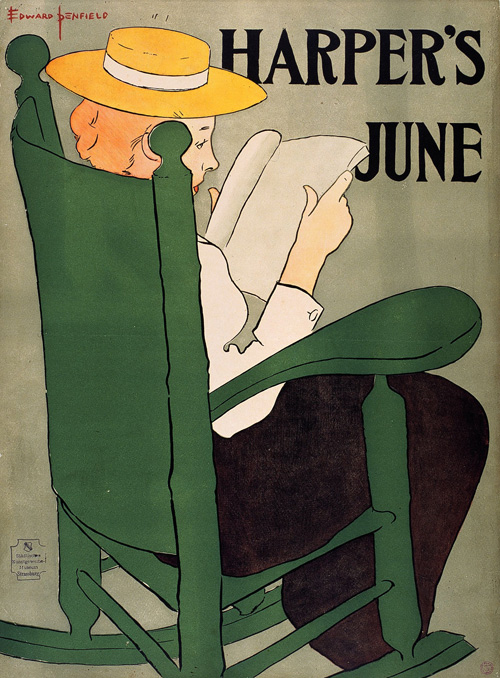
June 1896

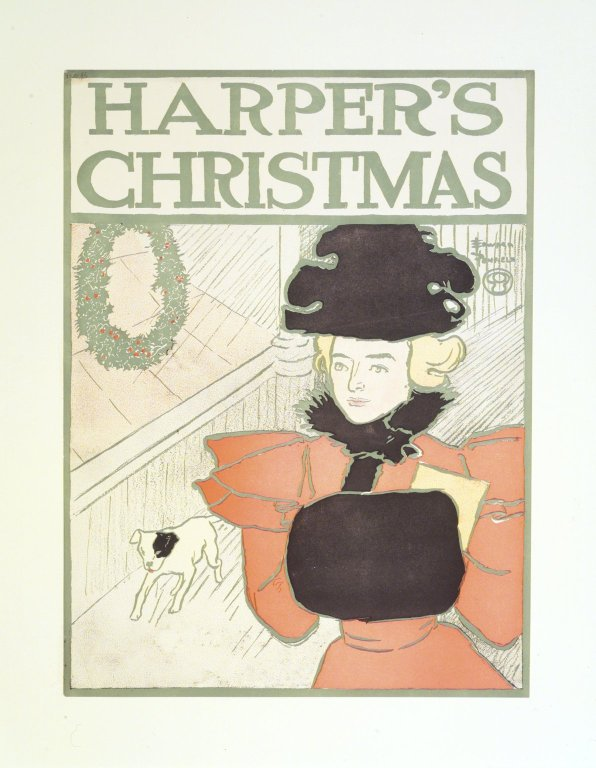
December 1896

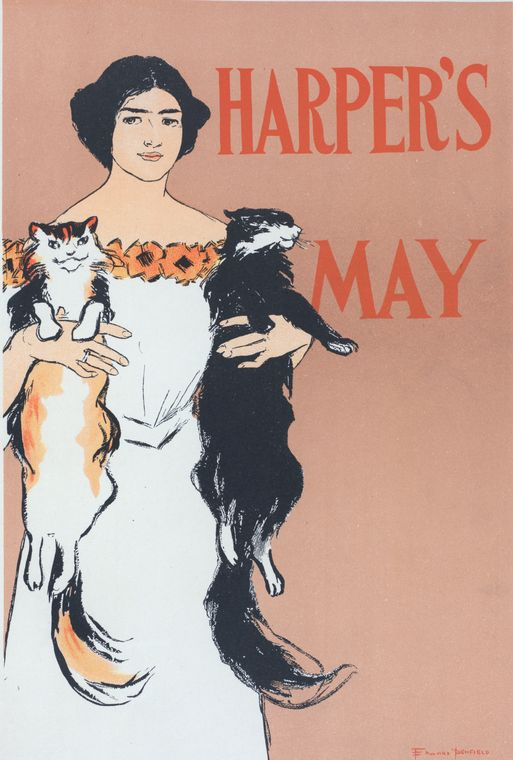
May 1897
