= Detective Story Magazine =

American pulp magazine

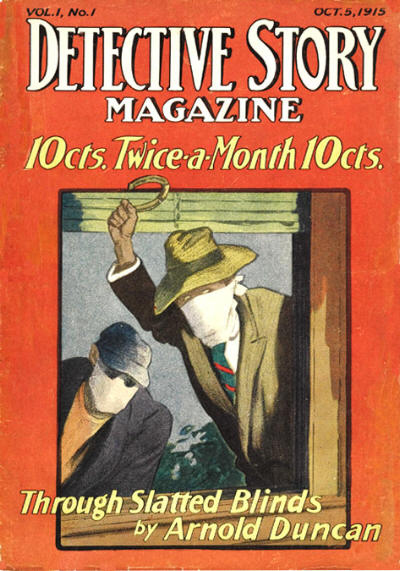
Debut issue of Detective Story Magazine (October 5, 1915)

Detective Story Magazine was an American magazine published by Street & Smith from October 15, 1915, to summer 1949 (1,057 issues). It was one of the first pulp magazines devoted to detective fiction and consisted of short stories and serials. While the publication was the publishing house's first detective-fiction pulp magazine in a format resembling a modern paperback (a "thick book" in dime novel parlance), Street & Smith had only recently ceased publication of the dime novel series Nick Carter Weekly, which concerned the adventures of a young detective.

From February 21, 1931 to its demise, the magazine was titled Street & Smith's Detective Story Magazine. During half of its 34-year life, the magazine was popular enough to support weekly issues. Ludwig Wittgenstein, the eminent philosopher, was among the magazine's readership.

== Radio ==
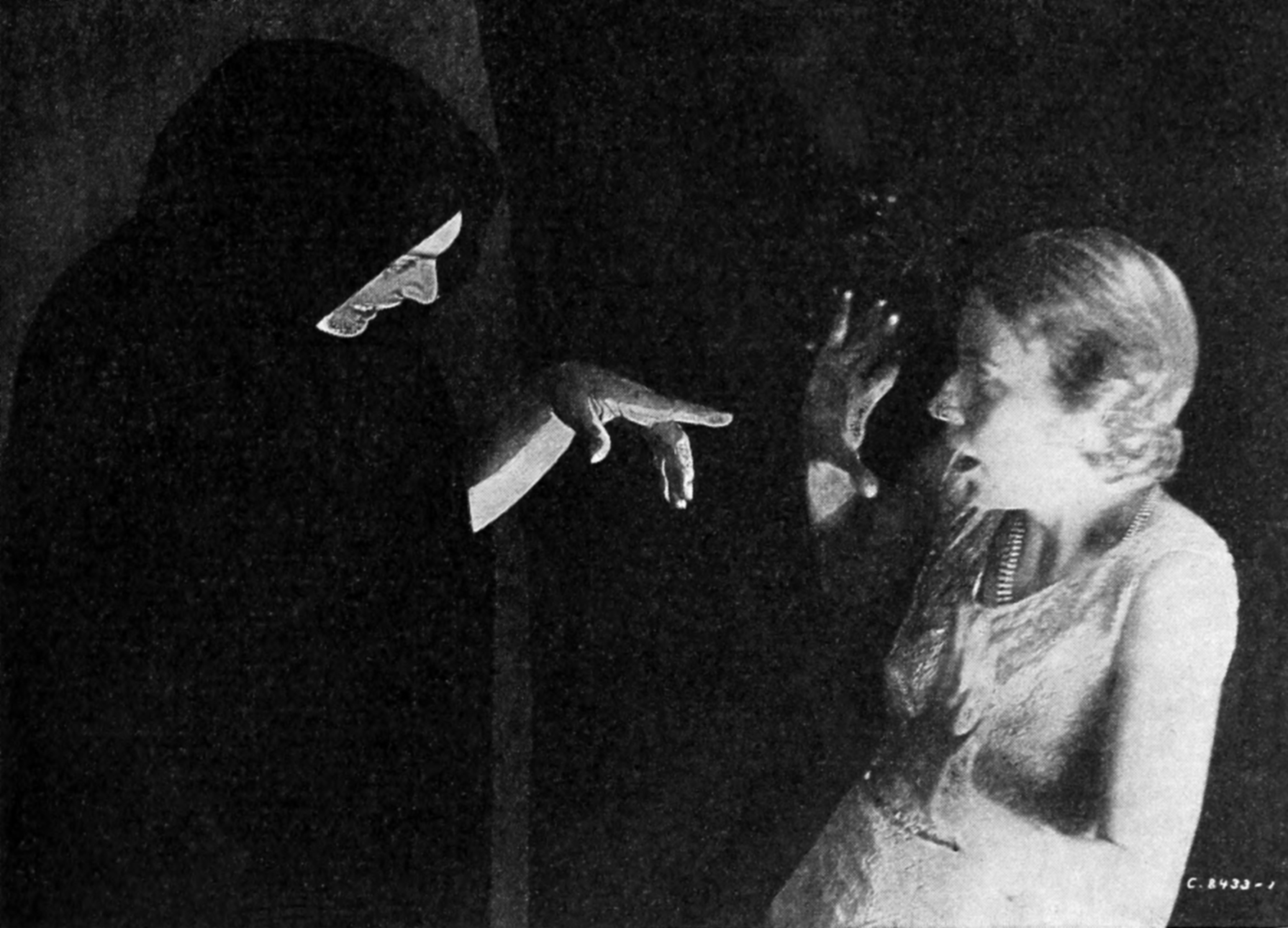
Promotional photograph for The Detective Story Hour, with James La Curto as The Shadow (1930)

Stories from the magazine were first heard on the radio on July 31, 1930. The Street and Smith radio program Detective Story Hour was narrated by a mysterious character named "The Shadow". Confused listeners would ask for copies of "The Shadow" magazine. As a result, Street & Smith debuted The Shadow Magazine on April 1, 1931, a pulp series created and primarily written by the prolific Walter B. Gibson.

The success of The Shadow and Doc Savage also prompted Street & Smith to revive Nick Carter as a hero pulp that ran from 1933 to 1936. A popular radio show, Nick Carter, Master Detective, aired on the Mutual Broadcasting System network from 1943 to 1955.

== Authors ==
Notable authors published in Detective Story include:

- Elmer Albert Apple (under penname A. E. Apple)
- Agatha Christie
- Carroll John Daly
- Arthur Conan Doyle
- H. Irving Hancock
- Johnston McCulley
- Fulton Oursler
- Arthur B. Reeve
- Sax Rohmer
- Thomas Thursday
- Edgar Wallace

== Editors ==
- Frank E. Blackwell (1915–1938)
- Anthony M. Rud (1938)
- Hazlett Kessler (1939–1940)
- R.B. Miller (1941)
- Ronald Oliphant (1942)
- Daisy Bacon (May 1942–Summer 1949)

== See also ==
- List of Street & Smith publications
