= Lucine Finch =

American dramatist

- Born: c. 1875
- Died: April 26, 1947 (aged 72); Greenwich, Connecticut, U.S.
- Resting place: Oak Hill Cemetery (Birmingham, Alabama)
- Education: University of Chicago
- Occupations: Writer, dramatist, poet
- Parent(s): Edwin Wilson Finch (?1850-?1899); Julia Neely Finch (1853-1926)

Lucine Finch (c. 1875 – April 26, 1947) was a dramatist, graphic artist, magazine storywriter and poet born in Alabama. She traveled across the United States performing a series of slave narratives and songs. She was one of the earliest people to teach the public about The Bible Quilt and its background.

== Biography ==
Finch attended the University of Chicago for five years, though she did not graduate.

Early in her dramatic career, she developed a program consisting of slave narratives and songs called her "Mammy Stories". Finch traveled across the United States and performed in theaters and colleges. She also performed at the University of California, Berkeley Wheeler Hall to positive reviews: "The artist ... has achieved a reputation for her work through the novel means she employs in giving a true portray of minstrel and vaudeville negro humor. With no stage settings or "make-up" she tells her stories of plantation superstitions and sings the songs of jubilees and revivals of a day gone by, from an arm-chair in the simple narrative fashion." In 1931, Finch hosted a 15-minute radio program called Stories of the Old South.

In 1914, Outlook Magazine published "A Sermon in Patchwork" by Finch. The article describes a unique covering stitched by Harriet Powers of Athens, Georgia. Powers, a former slave, created an appliqued quilt featuring Bible stories. The article included quotes, presumably, from Powers, who had died four years earlier as well as a photograph of the quilt, known as the Bible Quilt. The Finch article was one of the earliest known about The Bible Quilt, now in the collection of the Smithsonian Institution National Museum of American History in Washington, DC.

In the 1930s, Finch taught drama at the Edgewood School in Greenwich, Connecticut. Additionally, she and partner Clare Hamilton owned the Little Shop, an antiques and gift store, according to the Greenwich, Connecticut, city directories from the 1930s to 1941.

== Selected bibliography ==
Books

- Two in Arcadia. Brentanos, 1907. OCLC 2969772
- The Finch Players' Annual Benefit for the Finch School Day Nursery. New York: Finch School Neighborhood Assoc., 1916. OCLC 58779980

Stories and Poems

- "The Adopted Child," (poem), The American Magazine, vol. 68, July 1909, p. 262
- "Aunt 'Liza" One of the Slaves Who Stayed," American Magazine, vol. 67, February 1909, pp. 395 – 397.
- "The Boy at the Window," Harper's Monthly Magazine, vol. 129, October 1914, pp. 790 – 795.
- "Children," (poem), Outlook, vol. 107, July 25, 1914, p. 709.
- "David," Harper's Monthly Magazine, vol. 127, June 1913, pp. 102 – 111.
- "Experience," (poem), Harper's Monthly Magazine, vol. 115, June 1907, p. 107.
- "Let There Be Light," (poem), Harper's Monthly Magazine, vol. 134, January 1917, p. 273.
- "Life and Death," (poem), Outlook, vol. 101, July 27, 1912, p. 683.
- "Nathan's Little Old Lady," American Magazine, vol. 70, July 1910, pp. 330 – 337.
- "The Other Boy," Harper's Monthly Magazine, vol. 123, November 1911, pp. 933 – 938.
- "A Sermon in Patchwork," Outlook, vol. 108, October 28, 1914, pp. 493 – 495.
- "The Singing Gates," American Magazine, vol. 71, November 1910, pp. 42 – 50.
- "Slaves Who Stayed: Mammy," American Magazine, vol. 64, September 1907, pp. 551 – 553.
- "Slaves Who Stayed: Phil's Tom," American Magazine, vol. 65, December 1907, pp. 132 – 135.
- "The Spirit in the Old House: The Story of a Young Wife Who Understood," Ladies' Home Journal, vol. 29, May 1912, p. 20.
- "Two on the Battlefield," (poem), Outlook, vol. 110, July 21, 1915, p. 668.
- "Uncle Carter of the Peg-Leg: A Sketch from Life," Century Illustrated Monthly Magazine, vol. 76, May 1908, pp. 90 – 92.
- "When Life Comes Knocking at They Door," (poem), Harper's Monthly Magazine, vol. 131, August 1915, p. 456.
- "The Woman Who Waited," American Magazine, vol. 79, May 1915, pp. 51 – 54.

Plays

- Finch, Lucine, and Elizabeth L. Mullin. The Butterfly. Boston, 1910.

== Collections ==
- Lucine Finch Manuscripts. Birmingham Public Library, Department of Archives and Manuscript.
- Julia Neely Finch Papers, W. S. Hoole Special Collections Library, The University of Alabama. Includes letters between Lucine Finch and her mother, including a letter about Finch performing at Carnegie Hall in New York.
