= Dale Wimbrow =

American poet

Peter Dale Wimbrow, usually known as Dale Wimbrow, (June 6, 1895 – January 26, 1954) was an American composer, radio artist and writer. He is best known for the poem, The Guy in the Glass, written in 1934. Earlier in his career, he created several musical recordings in the still-young recording industry, and was known as "The Del-Mar-Va Songster". He occasionally recorded with a quartet of musicians known as the "Rubeville Tuners", and he was also sometimes known as Peter Dale.

== Biography ==
=== Early life and education ===
Peter Dale Wimbrow was born June 6, 1895, in Whaleyville, Maryland, the son of Nutter Jerome Wimbrow (1867-1957) and Sallie Mary Wimbrow, née Dale (1873-1951). He studied at Western Maryland College until World War I, although no source can be supplied.

=== Career ===
Wimbrow's early career was in music and radio. Under his own name and as Old Pete Daley of Whaleysville, he became known for his records and radio performances with orchestras. His credits include a number of recordings in the 1920s, in which he performed as the solo vocalist, and often as his own accompanist (on the ukulele). The majority of those songs were his own creation, and he began turning to songwriting almost exclusively in the later part of the decade. Perhaps his best-known musical composition was the 1930 jazz tune entitled "Accordion Joe". Played by Duke Ellington's band, it appeared that same year as the soundtrack to an animated short film of the same name, starring Betty Boop. The tune has appeared several times over the years in Duke Ellington compilation albums.

Wimbrow established the Indian River News newspaper in June 1948. It was published until September 1966, 12 years after his death in 1954, carried on by his wife.

==== The Guy in the Glass ====
Wimbrow wrote The Guy in the Glass for publication in The American Magazine in 1934. It is often mistitled The Man In The Glass. The poem became a popular clipping passed between people, and the author's credit was often dropped, leading to inquiries as to the author in newspapers as early as 1938.

Ann Landers printed the poem in her column on October 5, 1983, incorrectly attributing it to an anonymous man who died as a result of struggles with drug abuse. Landers received numerous letters that attributed or claimed different authorship of the poem, but only one of the letters published in her December 5, 1983, column correctly identified the author as Wimbrow.

=== Marriage and children ===
Wimbrow married Dorothy Livezy, a radio writer and producer. The couple had two children, Sally Dale Wimbrow and Peter Dale Wimbrow, Jr.

=== Death and afterward ===
Peter Dale Wimbrow died on January 26, 1954, in Sebastian, Florida and was interred at Dale Cemetery in Whaleyville, Maryland.

Dale Wimbrow Park, in Roseland, Florida, is named in his honor.

=== Dale Wimbrow in popular culture ===
The poem, The Guy in The Glass, was famously recited by Nigel Adkins, manager of Southampton Football Club in October 2012 during an interview with BBC South following a 4–1 defeat to West Ham United. In addition, England Rugby defence coach Steve Gustard used the poem to motivate the England Squad in Australia in June 2016 before their successful second test. (Eddie Jones My life and Rugby pp313)

== Published works ==
=== Print ===
- A Sardine and A Cracker (Washburn Printing Co., 1931)
- Swamp Cabbage and Angel Wings (Stuart News, 1953)

=== Discography ===
Song title	Performing artist	Year recorded	Label	Role / Notes
"Rock-a-bye Baby Days"	Dale Wimbrow (The Del-Mar-Va Songster) (hereinafter "Dale Wimbrow")	1925	Victor Talking; Machine Company (Victor)	male vocal solo, ukulele (self accompaniment)
"Country Bred and Chicken Fed"	Dale Wimbrow and his Rubeville Tuners	1926	Edison Records; Diamond Disc 11346 Blue Amberol Records 5276	male vocal solo, ukulele (self accompaniment); Released on diamond disc and phonograph cylinder; Digitized and available to listen or download
"So Long North (I'm Headin' South)"	Dale Wimbrow Rubeville Tuners	1926	Edison	vocal solo, ukulele, songwriter; Digitized (from Victrola playback) and available for listening.
"Sleepy Town"	Dale Wimbrow Rubeville Tuners	1926	Victor	vocal solo, songwriter
"Shake That Thing"	Original Indiana Five	1926	Victor	vocal solo
"Uncle Hezekiah"	Dale Wimbrow	1926	Victor	vocal solo, ukulele (self accompaniment)
"Strutting at the Funny Paper Ball"		1926		songwriter
"From Midnight Till Dawn"	Johnny Marvin	1927	Victor	songwriter
"Old Fashioned Locket"	Johnny Marvin	1927	Victor	songwriter
"Oshkosh"	Dale Wimbrow Rubeville Tuners	1927	Columbia Phonograph Company	vocal solo, ukulele, songwriter
"Roll Right Off'a My Green"	Dale Wimbrow Rubeville Tuners	1927	Columbia	vocal solo, ukulele, songwriter
"Oshkosh"	Dale Wimbrow Rubeville Tuners	1928	Edison	vocal solo, ukulele, songwriter
"Roll Right Off'a My Green"	Dale Wimbrow Rubeville Tuners	1928	Edison	vocal solo, ukulele, songwriter
"Black Sheep Blues"	Dale Wimbrow	1928	Victor	vocal solo, ukulele (self accompaniment)
"Think of Me, Thinking of You"	Johnny Marvin	1928	Victor	songwriter
"Wife o'Mine"	Ernest Hare	1928	Victor	composer
"Wife o'Mine"	Charles W. Harrison	1928	Edison	composer
"I Got Religion"	Rollickers	1928	Edison	songwriter (with Irving Bibo)
"The County Fair in Delaware"	Dale Wimbrow	1928	Columbia; "Del-Mar-Va Special Record" private label	vocal solo, songwriter; Digitized and available for listening.
"The Good Old Eastern Shore"	Dale Wimbrow	1928	Columbia; "Del-Mar-Va Special Record" private label	vocal solo, songwriter; Digitized and available for listening.
"Think of Me, Thinking of You"	Piccadilly Players	1929	Edison	songwriter (with Johnny Marvin & Charlie Abbott)
"Every Moon's a Honeymoon (With You)"	Rudy Vallée and the Connecticut Yankees	1929	Victor	lyricist
"Plucky Lindy's Lucky Day"	Vernon Dalhart	1929	Victor	songwriter
"Plucky Lindy's Lucky Day"	High Hatters	1929	Victor	songwriter
"That's What I Call Heaven"	Gene Austin	1929	Victor	songwriter
"That's What I Call Heaven"	Leo Reisman Orchestra; Ran Weeks	1929	Victor	songwriter
"That's What I Call Heaven"	Rollickers	1929	Edison	songwriter
"Goodness Gracious, Gracie"	Billy Murray & Walter Scanlan	1929	Edison	songwriter (with Casem & Charlie Abbott)
"Accordion Joe"	Jack Teagarden / Cornell & his Orchestra	1930 (2006)	Jazz Oracle	composer (Wimbrow has sole credit for this original version); Released in 2006 on 1930 Studio Sessions
"Accordion Joe"	Duke Ellington	1930	various	composer (with Charles Cornell (alias Cornell Smelser))
