= John Sanborn Phillips =

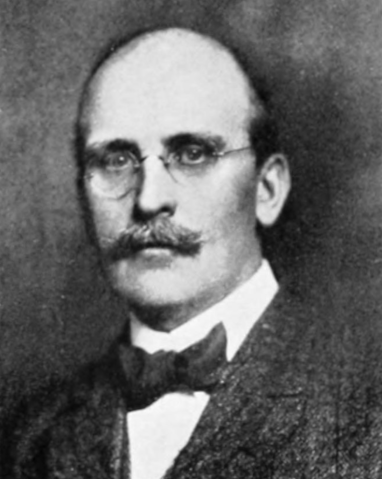
- Born: July 2, 1861; Council Bluffs, Iowa
- Died: February 28, 1949 (aged 87); Goshen, New York
- Education: Knox College; Harvard College
- Occupation: Publisher
- Spouse: Emma Delia West (m. 1885)
- Children: 5
- Relatives: Samuel Huntington (grandson)

John Sanborn Phillips (1861–1949) attended Knox College in Illinois, where he worked on the student newspaper and met S. S. McClure. After earning an associate's degree, he entered Harvard College as a junior, and graduated in 1885, magna cum laude. In 1887 McClure hired him to manage the home office of the McClure Newspaper Syndicate (founded in 1884).

The two went on to found the famous McClure's Magazine, first published in June 1893, where Phillips was co-editor. In 1900 Phillips became a partner in the publisher McClure, Phillips and Company.

In 1906, he left McClure's with Ida Tarbell, along with Lincoln Steffens and Ray Stannard Baker to purchase American Illustrated Magazine and convert it into The American Magazine.

== Personal life ==
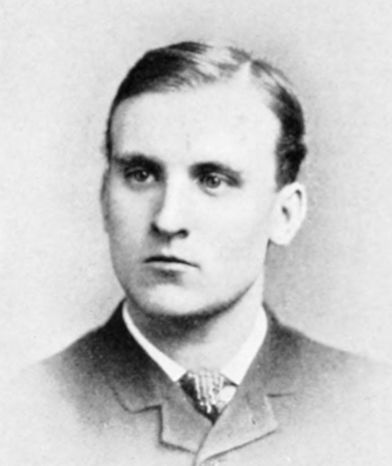
At Harvard, c. 1885

Phillips was born in Council Bluffs, Iowa on July 2, 1861, the son of Edgar E. Phillips (1827-1908) and Mary Lavinia Sanborn (1835-1914). Edgar's mother was Sarah Evertson, a member of a prominent Dutch American family from New York City. Through his father he was a descendant of Reverend George Phillips, founder of Watertown, Massachusetts and the progenitor of the New England Phillips family.

He married Emma Delia West on August 25, 1885, and they had five children.

His grandson Samuel Huntington (son of Richard Thomas Huntington and Dorothy Sanborn Phillips) was a professor at Harvard University and a well-known political scientist.

John Sanborn Phillips died at his home in Goshen, New York on February 28, 1949.
