= Marion Hamilton Carter =

American writer (1865-1937)

- Born: April 9, 1865; Philadelphia, Pennsylvania, U.S.
- Died: March 12, 1937; Martha's Vineyard
- Education: Radcliffe College; Vassar College; Massachusetts Institute of Technology; Cornell University
- Occupations: Educator; journalist; author

Marion Hamilton Carter (April 9, 1865 – March 12, 1937) was an American Progressive Era educator, psychologist, children's literature editor, short story writer, and artist. In her prime, she worked as a muckraker journalist, magazine editor, women's suffrage advocate, and novelist. She was an early member of the Authors League of America (now the Authors Guild), and published short fiction and nonfiction in popular magazines of the day. She is best known today for her suffrage novel, The Woman With Empty Hands: The Evolution of a Suffragette.

== Early life ==
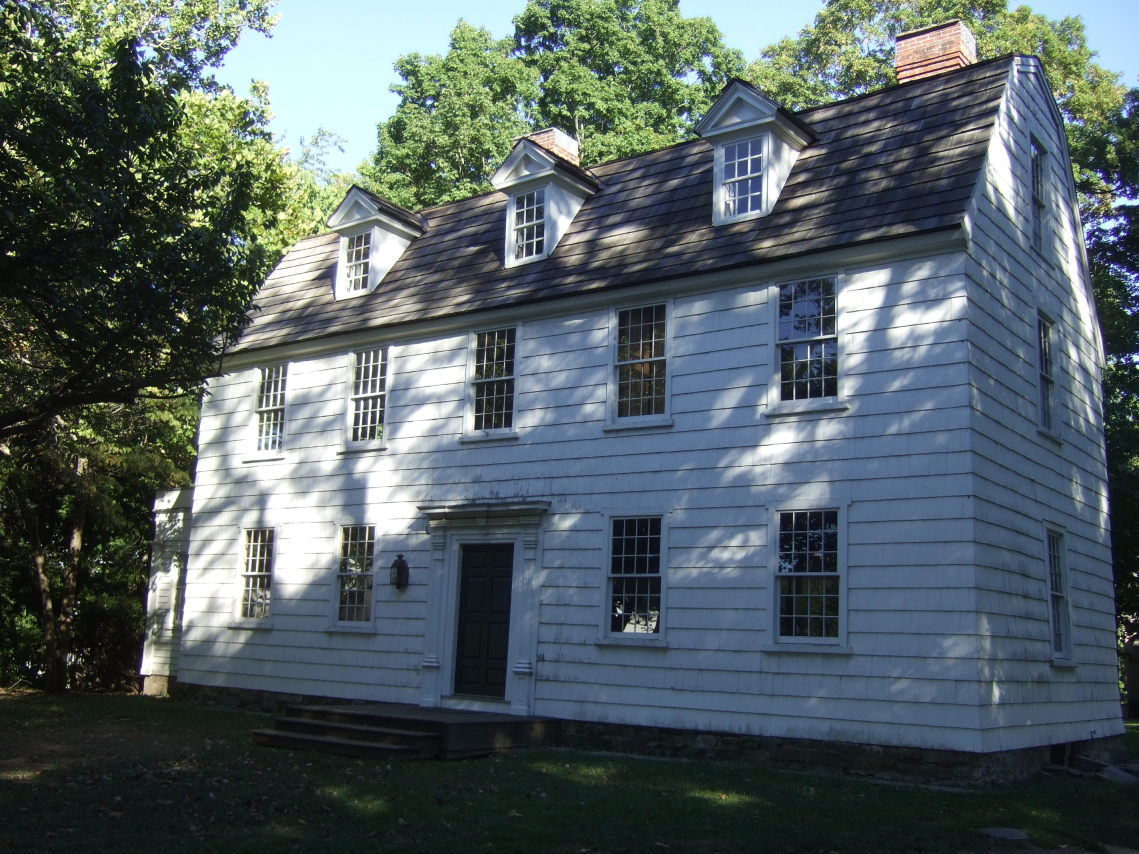
Marion Hamilton Carter spent childhood summers at her grandparents' home, formerly the Sun Tavern, in Fairfield, Connecticut

Marion Hamilton Carter was the eldest of three children born into a comfortable upper-middle-class family in Philadelphia at the end of the Civil War. Her Dutch American father, Dr. Charles Carter (1837-1898) of Binghamton, New York, graduated from Columbia University College of Physicians and Surgeons in 1861, and served as a Surgeon in the U.S. Navy 1861–1863, before marrying Mary Nelson Bunker (1841-1908) of Fairfield, Connecticut. Marion's grandfather Captain John Bunker (1796-1852) died at sea and left his Fairfield house (formerly the colonial Sun Tavern) to Marion's Irish-born grandmother, Fanny Hamilton McOrin (Bunker) (1816-1897). In 1867 Marion's father purchased the home from his mother-in-law and the Carter family spent the next eighteen years summering in Connecticut. After selling the Fairfield house and sending their children to college, Marion's parents spent winters in their mountain-top cottage in Blowing Rock, North Carolina where Marion's mother organized benevolent societies, a Sunday school, and a public library. In addition to her community work, Mary Nelson Carter published a collection of seventeen first-person sketches of western North Carolina local life, written in rural dialect, and including stories of the Civil War and its aftermath in Appalachia. Her book was well received throughout the United States.

== Education ==
Marion Carter and her younger sister Kathleen received a science-based education in Philadelphia that prepared them for acceptance into elite east-coast women's colleges. Kathleen attended Barnard College (BSc 1892) and the University of Pennsylvania (PhD in Psychology 1895). Marion attended and probably taught at Miss Van Kirk's Philadelphia Training School for Kindergartners c1883-1887 and served in 1886 as Secretary to the school's fundraising Society of Kindergarten Helpers. She attended Vassar College 1887-1889 as a "Collegiate Special" and went on to complete a four-year course in Biology at the Boston Institute of Technology in 1893 (now Massachusetts Institute of Technology), followed by a year there as a "Special." In 1892 Carter applied to study psychology under philosopher and psychologist William James at Harvard University but she did not get in because the university did not accept women. Instead, she attended Radcliffe College for the first of two years of non-graduate study. Carter's application for a passport suggests that she might have travelled abroad in the fall of 1894. In 1895–1896, while officially registered at Radcliffe, Carter studied at Harvard University in the Education Seminary (then a sub-department of the Philosophy Department). Working under the direction of Paul Henry Hanus and William James, she patented seventy-five paper dolls for use in schools to stimulate creative writing abilities in children. In 1896-1897 she took her paper doll experiments into the Willimantic State Normal School. She received a BSc from Cornell University in 1898 and worked towards a PhD in philosophy at Cornell the following year.

== Teaching career ==
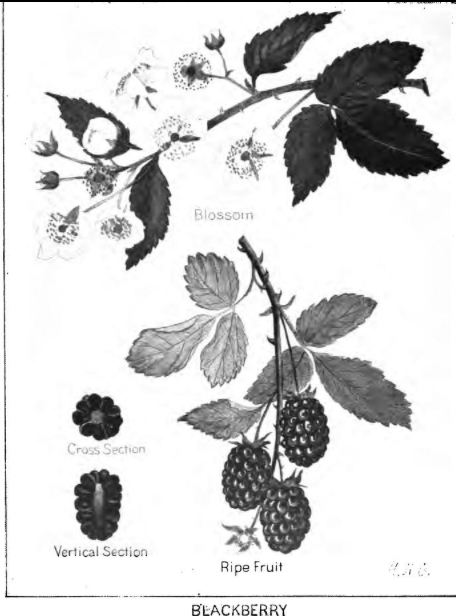
Carter's drawing of a blackberry plant from her teaching manual Nature Study With Common Things (1904)

By the time she was thirty-four, Carter had taught children for eleven years while simultaneously attending institutions of higher learning. In 1899, during her first year of teaching at the New York Teacher Training School (affiliated with Columbia University), she gave a lecture series at the school entitled "The Psychical Significance of Fear: Its Relation to Other Emotions and Its Influence on Development." By 1902 Carter was also serving as Superintendent of Nature Studies in the public schools of Greater New York and lived as a "Special Student" at Barnard College. She had applied in early 1902 for the position of Supervisor of Boston Schools but was unsuccessful. Carter's 1904 McClure's article, "The Parent," recounts her years of teaching by categorizing various types of problematic parents: indifferent, inconsiderate, meddlesome, fond, proud, troublesome, irate, ignorant, and enlightened. In each anecdote Carter's dislike of teaching shines through, and she ends the piece with the admission that "the Gordian knot of the parent problem was beyond untying. I have cut it." After she left teaching in 1904 to pursue a career as a writer and journalist, Carter wrote a letter to the editor of The New York Times about the New York Teacher Training School's unhealthy air quality and the numerous absences and deaths of students who had "quick consumption," as rapid onset tuberculosis was known then. During her transition from teaching to journalism, Carter published seven books: a nature study teaching manual, with her own hand-drawn illustrations of common flowers, fruits, and vegetables, and six editions of children's animal stories previously published in St. Nicholas Magazine.

== Influence of William James ==
During the early 1900s Carter corresponded with her former professor William James, founder of the American Society for Psychical Research. She saw herself as his "gentleman" colleague in a friendship marked by "sacred delicacies" such as not capitalizing on his fame. Before she had become disillusioned with kindergarten pedagogy, she had attempted to "convert" James to the kindergarten "Philosophy of Philosophies." Carter had serious depression throughout her life, and she credited James' essay "Is Life Worth Living?" and his Varieties of Religious Experience for having saved her life during two particularly dark episodes. James' intellectual influence is apparent in Carter's later mature work.

== Investigative journalism ==
Carter's journalism career coincided with the height of early twentieth-century muckraker journalism. She published in McClure's Magazine (1904-1910) and funneled other investigative work through magazines, newspapers, and letters to newspaper editors. Although Carter expressed progressive views with regards to education, science, psychology, and women's rights, some of her investigative journalism was contrarian or reactionary in nature.

Pedagogy

Carter published a controversial piece in 1899 in The Atlantic Monthly, "The Kindergarten Child – after the Kindergarten," which drew strong criticism from the teaching profession as a "remarkably inaccurate article" that depicted kindergarten as "a machine for turning out prigs, children sentimentalists, and infant poseurs." The article stirred heated debate in the following months. Years later Carter revisited the subject in an article for The Housekeeper series on "The Truth About Public Schools" in which she described kindergarten as "Infant Vaudeville," "Joy Saloon," and "one of the most insidiously immoral institutions in the country." In another critique of kindergarten Carter poked fun at "Child Study," her sister Kathleen's academic specialty, and cited a "fond mama's" journal record of her child's development that parodied her sister's work. Still obsessed about kindergarten in 1911, Carter gave a speech to the Iowa Press and Authors Club in which she denounced it as "the country's greatest menace to prosperity, not barring liquors or drugs."

Prohibition Journalism

In late 1905, Carter wrote a letter to the editor of The New York Times appealing to women to protest the anti-canteen law of 1901, an early measure of Prohibition in the United States that banned the sale of liquor in Army canteens and was supported by the Women's Christian Temperance Union. She took an anti-suffragist and pro-liquor lobby stance and argued, "when the underlying motive of such laws is largely spite against a sex in general on the part of a few disgruntled woman suffragists it is shocking to every sense of decency." She urged "every woman whose ethical standards have risen above those of the common or garden toad ... to add her name to the list of supporters of the canteen."

Legal Journalism

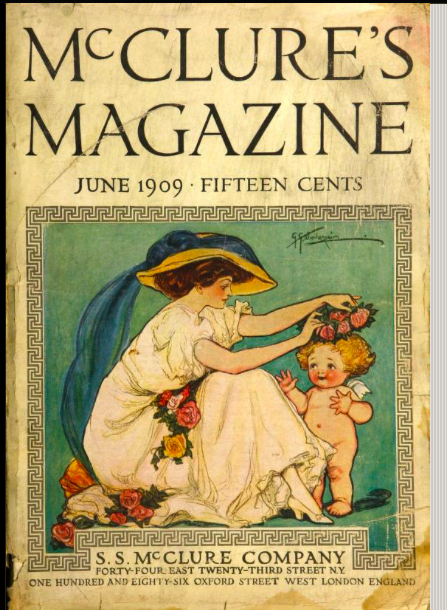
Carter published her investigative article, "The Conservation of the Defective Child," in this issue of McClure's Magazine.

Carter established her reputation as a muckraking journalist through her months-long coverage of the sensational 1906 Josephine Terranova murder trial. Seventeen-year-old Terranova had killed her uncle and aunt after enduring five years of physical, sexual, and psychological abuse under their care. The Brooklyn Daily Eagle reported that the girl's story "was worse than anything heard before in a New York court room" and The Washington Post called it "a story so brutal in its details, as the girl told it, that there were men in the courtroom who felt uncomfortable because they had to be there to listen to it." Terranova herself participated in the jury selection process and chose twelve fathers who, after being instructed by the judge to weigh in on the side of the prosecution, took less than fifteen minutes to acquit her. Carter, having spent years of scientific research on aural hallucinations and trance phenomena, focused her coverage on Terranova's psychological state and the fact that the murder case was the first in legal history to present hallucinatory voices as part of the defense. She did not have a byline for her news stories on the trial and so it is not known which New York City newspaper employed her.

Journalism about the Occult

Carter believed she had psychic abilities and connected William James to a number of mediums in New York City for his own investigations into psychic phenomena. She started writing an article about the medium Eusapia Palladino for McClure's, but she told James that her editor had "snatched" it away at the last moment, hoping that James would write it instead. Years later, known for her working relationship with James on psychic phenomena, Carter was asked to investigate the mediumship claims of Eunice Winkler, a sixteen-year-old Brooklyn girl who claimed to have channeled dictation from writer and humorist Mark Twain.

Science/Medical Journalism

In 1909 McClure's Magazine commissioned Carter to spend a summer in South Carolina and write investigative pieces on two epidemics raging among the poor: pellagra and hookworm. Carter presented an exhaustive history of pellagra, linking the disease among poor peasants in Italy to a primarily corn-based diet. She also reported the most recent scientific research on pellagra in the United States, which was first noticed in South Carolina in 1902, broke out as an epidemic in 1906, and by 1912 had resulted in 30,000 cases and a death rate of 40%. Five years after Carter's article was published, epidemiologist Joseph Goldberger conducted experiments that would shift scientific investigations of pellagra from germ theory to the problem of diet and poverty in the South, a social issue denied by southern politicians for many years. The cause of pellagra, niacin nutrient deficiency, would not be discovered until 1937.

Carter's story on hookworm focused on the two million sick poor white people in the South whom she described as "shiftless, ignorant, poverty-pinched, and wretched ... as purely Anglo-Saxon as any left in the country." Backed by strong historical, medical, and scientific research, the article presented the problem of hookworm in considerable detail but also reflected the deeply held racist attitudes of the scientific community. Carter, after reporting the "relative immunity of the negro race" from hookworm disease, concluded her piece with this surprising statement: "Ignorant of his own condition, oblivious to the white man's common decencies, the negro is thus the great reservoir and spreader of the hookworm disease in the States that harbor him.... But if the negro brought the hookworm in the beginning, it is the white man who has let him spread it—has let him continue his jungle habits and has not taught him better."

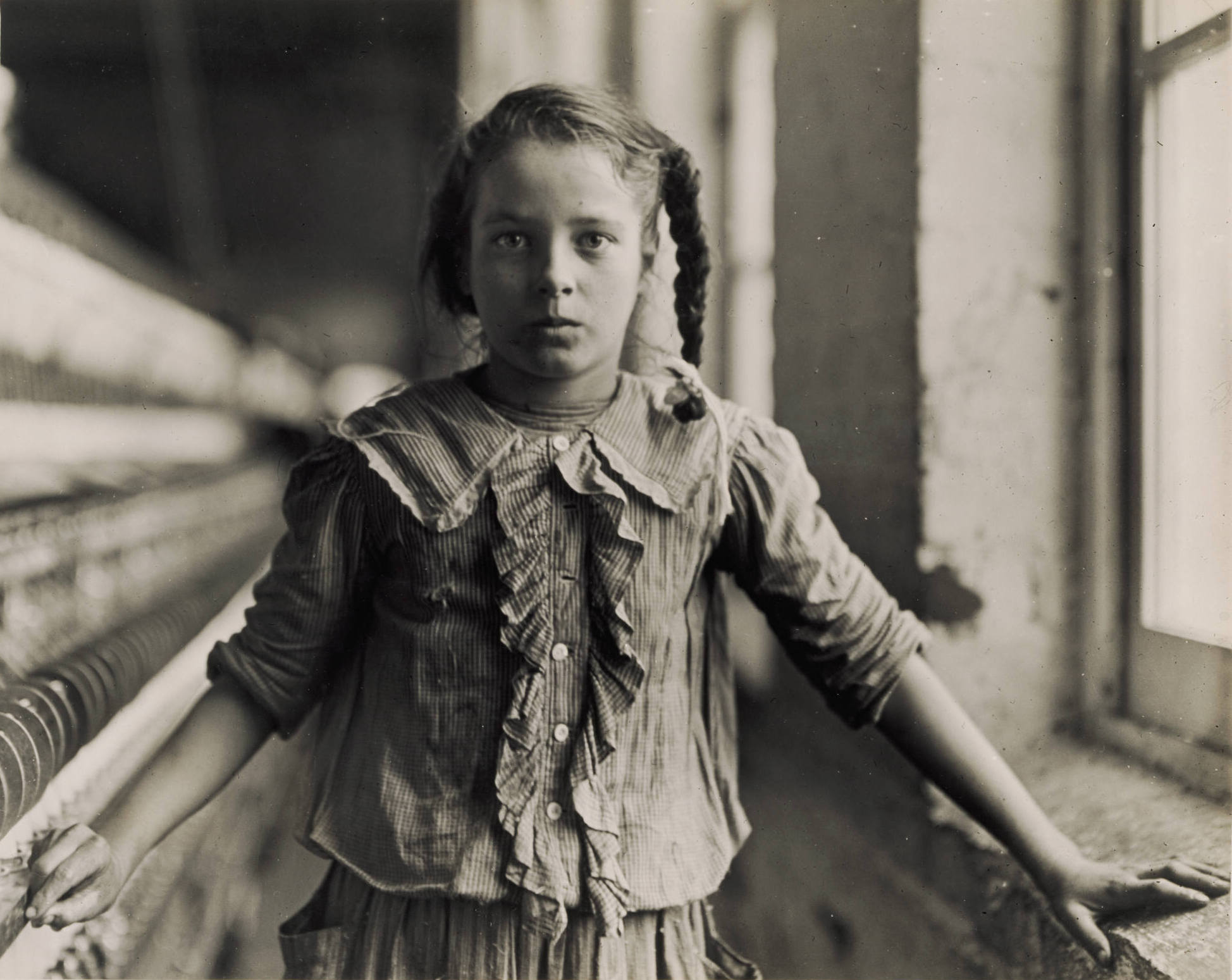
Lewis Hine, photographer for the National Child Labor Committee, documented child laborers among cotton mill workers in 1908.

Child Labor Journalism

In 1913 Carter published a pro child labor letter to the editor of The New York Times, "The Child Toilers," based upon an unpublished investigation she had conducted in 1909. The letter received scathing responses. She had toured South Carolina cotton mills and concluded, un-ironically, that "compared with the dreadful, eye-straining, nerve-exhausting, fad and frilly child labor of the New York schools and kindergartens, child labor in the Carolina cotton mills seemed to me a privilege and a blessing." Mill children, she claimed, were better fed, housed, educated, dressed, and mentally engaged than their rural counterparts. The Buffalo Inquirer responded sarcastically: "Horror of child labor in the southern cotton mills, it seems, is a misplaced emotion. The mills are really sanitariums for children. They are grand agencies of uplift. Work in them is a daylong delight. For physical and moral betterment they have few equals and no superiors among the country's institutions. This remarkable information is the result of the investigation of Mrs. Marion Hamilton Carter."

== Magazine editor ==
Carter worked as associate editor of McClure's from late 1909 through 1910. Her time at McClure's overlapped with that of author Willa Cather who contributed to the magazine as well as serving as managing editor beginning in October 1908. Cather had full responsibility for running the magazine from fall 1909 to 1911. Like Cather, Carter, in her editorial capacity, wrote numerous pieces during her professional career either anonymously or under assumed names. Little of her unsigned and pseudonymous work has been recovered. After she resigned from McClure's in late 1910 or early 1911 Carter gave invited presentations about women in the press. At the Iowa Press and Authors' Club in Des Moines she spoke on "Woman and Magazine Work." She promoted her newly acquired women's magazine, The Woman's Era, to be launched in October (not to be confused with the African American magazine The Woman's Era).

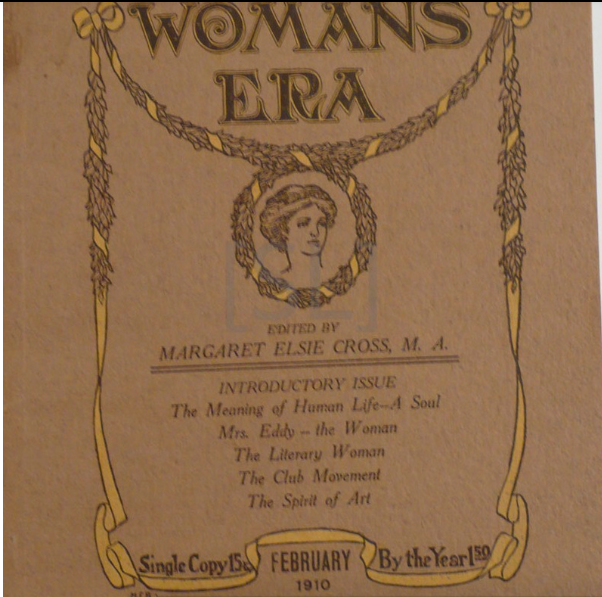
Woman's Era Magazine (New Orleans) February, 1910, first issue.

The previous short-lived Woman's Era: A Magazine of Inspiration for the Modern Woman, had been founded by New Orleans suffragist and clubwoman Inez M. Myers in 1910 and edited by education professor Margaret Elsie Cross, a graduate of Columbia University and its affiliated New York Teacher Training School. The magazine functioned as the official organ of the Louisiana Federation of Women's Clubs, featured well-known feminist authors Charlotte Perkins Gilman, Alice Moore Hubbard, and Florence Kelley, and published a special issue on "Votes for Women" in May 1910 with a contribution from suffrage leader Anna Howard Shaw. When the magazine failed in the spring of 1911, an organization of New York women, including Carter, purchased The Woman's Era with the goal of producing a high-quality magazine "by women for women." Carter intended her Woman's Era magazine to be "a sort of Woman's McClure" and, as editor-in-chief, she planned to hire "women prominent in the field of literature." Her proposed staff included suffragist, journalist, and novelist Mary Holland Kinkaid; Carter's sister Kathleen Carter Moore; N. Parker Willis from the New York Journal of Commerce as associate editor (not to be confused with editor Nathaniel Parker Willis); art director Joseph Cummings Chase; and former lecturers from Cornell University, Louise Sheffield Brownell Saunders and Alexander Buel Trowbridge. The new magazine, however, does not appear to have materialized.

== Fiction ==
Short fiction

Carter was contracted in 1909 to write fiction for a new syndicated children's page, "For Every Boy and Girl," alongside other noted American authors such as Henry Cabot Lodge, L. Frank Baum, Clara Morris, Charles Battell Loomis, Carolyn Wells, and Edmund Vance Cooke. She published numerous short stories between 1905 and 1922 in popular magazines: The Saturday Evening Post, Collier's Weekly, The Century Magazine, Woman's Home Companion, Everybody's Magazine, The Delineator, and The Youth's Companion. Many of those written in the 1910s are set in Wyoming where she had travelled in 1911 to interview New Woman Judge Mary A. Garrett, believed at the time to be the first woman justice of the peace in the United States. Carter's cousin, Judge Herman V.S. Groesbeck of Laramie, Wyoming had written her a letter of introduction to Garrett and instructed her, "Go and see how [ women's suffrage in Wyoming ] works out here." Combining interviews she had conducted with Judge Garrett and a young Wyoming school teacher, Carter wrote "The Autobiography of a Wyoming School Teacher" and pitched it to her Century Magazine editors as a piece in the "confession" genre that should be published anonymously. She published at least two other anonymous "autobiographies" based upon personal interviews that she had conducted. These articles blur the line between literary realism and creative nonfiction and are difficult to categorize.

Novels

The Remittance Man

Carter pitched her serialized novel The Remittance Man to a Century Magazine editor in 1912 as "the real goods on life as I have lived it and seen it lived. I don't know any other novel on Rocky Mountain life that is." Like her Saturday Evening Post non-fiction article with the same title, the novel would likely have been published anonymously or with a pen name if it was published.

The Woman With Empty Hands: The Evolution of a Suffragette

The Woman With Empty Hands: The Evolution of a Suffragette, published anonymously in 1913 and dedicated to British suffragette Emmeline Pankhurst and her daughters, is a work of fiction presented as autobiography and supposedly penned by "a well-known suffragette." Written in the first person, it tells the story of an elite widowed woman from Richmond, Virginia—feeling hopeless, devastated, and purposeless after the deaths of her husband and only child—who converts to the women's suffrage cause after meeting a young suffragette distributing pamphlets on the street. Carter quoted from her friend William James' Memories and Studies to argue for the narrator's inner growth—from grieving widow to suffragist to militant suffragette. The narrator bears a slight resemblance to an unnamed black-clad Virginian suffragist in journalist Mary Alden Hopkins' contemporaneous account of the May 4, 1912 New York suffrage parade. In a condensed version of Carter's story, first published in The Saturday Evening Post, the inclusion of May 4, 1912 parade photographs of suffrage leaders Inez Milholland, Josephine Beiderhase, and Harriot Stanton Blatch confirms that Carter's parade scene refers to the same historical event, suggesting to readers that they are reading a true story.

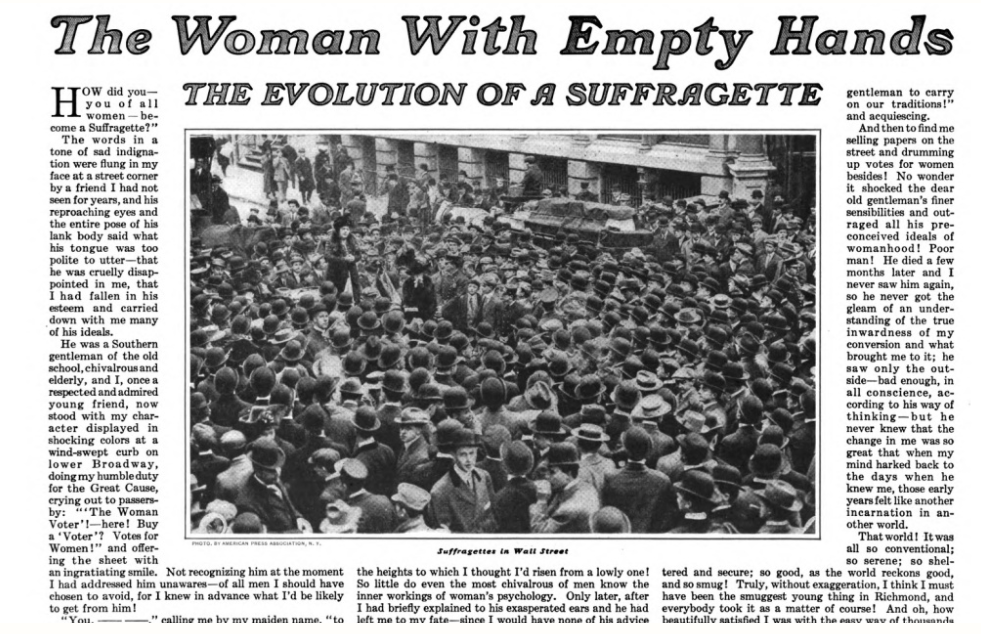

Carter never married and was neither a well-known suffragette nor a genteel southern woman. She may have put current suffrage debate into the mouth and mind of an anonymous narrator to personalize that debate and persuade readers, or, as a journalist, she might have interviewed a suffragette and decided to ghost-write, quote, or appropriate that account to promote women's suffrage. As with Carter's previous "autobiographies," it is possible that this narrator is a composite character. The Woman With Empty Hands functions as testimonial suffrage propaganda that argues against anti-suffragism views—held by northerners and southerners, men and women, alike. As suffrage scholars Mary Chapman and Angela Mills note, the story is part of a suffrage literature tradition that privileges dialogue "over individual utterance" and that dialogue plays out within a conversion narrative. According to anti-suffragists, women like the narrator at the beginning of Carter's story were already equal to men in their God-given role as mothers and wives in the private sphere, a world characterized by piety, purity, submission and domesticity (defined in the late twentieth century as the Cult of Domesticity). Chapman and Mills recognize that The Woman With Empty Hands "invites women to imagine themselves as members of collectives other than those provided by marriage and motherhood."

Souls Resurgent

Carter published her second novel, Souls Resurgent, to favorable reviews in 1916. Guided by her early reading of Charles Darwin and his friend evolutionary biologist George Romanes, and influenced by contemporary ideas about eugenics and evolutionary psychology, Carter explores the narrow concept of race-mixing within a hierarchy of whiteness that places Anglo-Saxons as morally and intellectually superior to other racial/ethnic groups. Setting the story in Wyoming ranch country, she argues that the mixture of races between the protagonist Dora's parents—her Scottish-Norwegian New England father and Irish Catholic mother— has resulted in the children (Dora's brother and sister) growing up, like their warm-hearted but "slovenly" mother, with no sense of duty or discipline. Dora realizes at the end of the novel that "long breeding and spontaneous selection among like-minded people had produced those ideals of duty, honor, obligation, and responsibility so dear to her and her father; cross breeding eliminated those ideals from both strains of the blood." This evolutionary rhetoric is echoed in the description of another of the novel's characters, "the offspring of a German immigrant girl" and an Englishman, who exemplifies "the worst in both strains of blood...." Similarly, Carter's antisemitism influences her stereotypical portrayal of Dora's brother's tragic "mixed marriage." As in her earlier work, Carter cites William James. She dedicated Souls Resurgent to her mother who had died eight years earlier.

== Later years ==
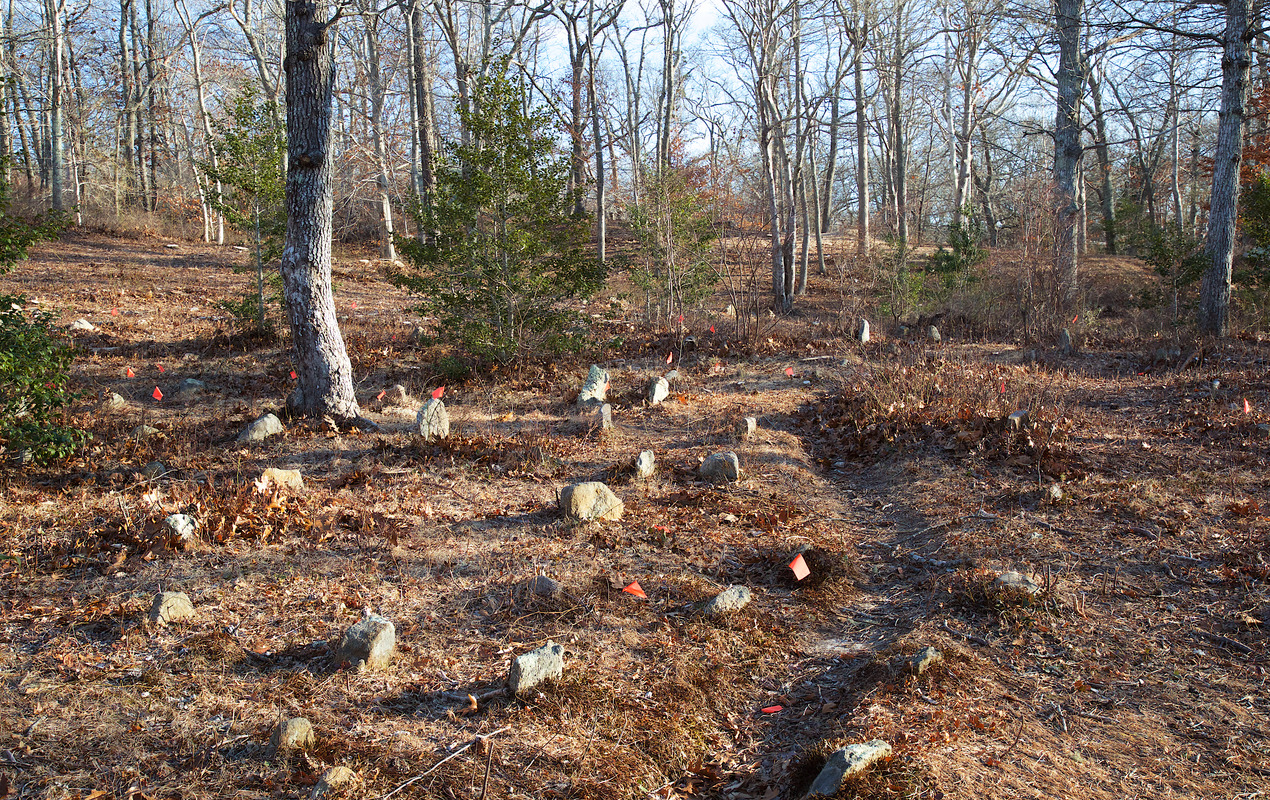
Burial grounds in Christiantown, Chilmark. Photo David R. Foster.

In the summer of 1920, Carter, now fifty-five, lived in the Pennsylvania home of her sister Kathleen and brother-in-law zoologist John Percy Moore to help care for Kathleen who was dying of tuberculosis. By 1922 Carter had moved to Christiantown, Massachusetts, an unoccupied Native American reservation on the northwest side of Martha's Vineyard that she had loved since she was a child. She had known Wampanoag families in the area before the town was wiped out by smallpox in 1888, held fond memories of those earlier years, and felt spiritually connected to the land and the dead. She purchased an old gray-shingled house in the woods and lived alone there until the end of her life. Pulitzer Prize-winning journalist Henry Beetle Hough visited her on her last day in the cottage shortly before her death and he reflected afterwards on the place she left behind, "the record of years lived differently, valiantly, and to a particular taste and interest."

== Death and legacy ==
Carter died on March 12, 1937, a month short of her 72nd birthday. She left her Christiantown property to Cornell University with a provision that it remain intact for thirty years for family use, and she bequeathed her art, including J. M. W. Turner watercolors, Max Klinger etchings, Chinese paintings, bronzes, jades and other objets d'art, to Vassar College . Her recovered oeuvre represents a cross-section of early twentieth-century American popular literature that traces a typical trajectory, like the paths that journalism scholar Jean Lutes explores, of women journalists who became novelists.

== Published works ==
Books

- Nature Study with Common Things: an Elementary Laboratory Manual. New York: American Book Company, 1904.
- The Woman with Empty Hands: The Evolution of a Suffragette. New York: Dodd Mead and Company, 1913.
- Souls Resurgent. New York: Charles Scribner's Sons, 1916.

Editions

- About Animals: Retold from St. Nicholas Magazine. New York: D. Appleton Century Company, 1904.
- Bear Stories: Retold from St. Nicholas Magazine. New York: D. Appleton Century Company, 1904.
- Stories of Brave Dogs: Retold from St. Nicholas Magazine. New York: D. Appleton Century Company, 1904.
- Lion and Tiger Stories: Retold from St. Nicholas Magazine. New York: D. Appleton Century Company, 1904.
- Cat Stories: Retold from St. Nicholas Magazine. New York: D. Appleton Century Company, 1904.
- Panther Stories: Retold from St. Nicholas Magazine. New York: D. Appleton Century Company, 1904.

Journals and Magazines

Scholarly

- "Chromogenic bacteria." Letter to the Editor, New York Medical Journal, 59 (1894): 372.
- "Agar." Journal of Applied Microscopy and Laboratory Methods, Vol. I (Rochester, NY: Bausch & Lomb Optical Company, 1898), 62-63.
- "Educational Paper Dolls." The Journal of Pedagogy, Vol.11 (April 1898): 133-144.
- "Darwin's Idea of Mental Development." The American Journal of Psychology, Vol. 9, Issue 4 (July 1898): 534-559.
- "Romanes' Idea of Mental Development." The American Journal of Psychology, Vol. 11, Issue 1 (October 1899): 101-118.

Summaries of articles

- Evolution and Consciousness by Oliver H.P. Smith, The Philosophical Review, Vol. 8 (1899): 321-322.
- Evolution Evolved by Alfred H. Lloyd, The Philosophical Review, Vol. 8 (1899): 321-322.
- Vitalism by C. Morgan Lloyd, The Philosophical Review, Vol. 8 (1899): 321-322.
- Das Bewusstsein Des Wollens by A. Pfander, The Philosophical Review, Vol. 8 (1899): 75-77.

Opinion

- "As To The Canteen: Another Voice for a Woman's Movement Distinct from the W.C.T.U." Letter to the Editor, The New York Times, December 1, 1905.
- "Death-Dealing Ventilation: Foul Air Forced Through School Buildings by New Process." Letter to the Editor, The New York Times, January 23, 1906.
- "The Child Toilers: Southern Mills Don't Grind Them, Marion Carter Says." Letter to the Editor, The New York Times, February 4, 1913.

Nonfiction

- "The Kindergarten Child – after the Kindergarten." The Atlantic Monthly, March 1899: 358–365.
- "The Parent." McClure's Magazine, November 1904: 90–101.
- "One Man and his Town." McClure's Magazine, January 1908: 275.
- "[The Juvenile Joy Saloon]. " The Housekeeper (Minneapolis, Minnesota), October 1908.
- "The Conservation of the Defective Child." McClure's Magazine, June 1909: 160-171
- "The Vampire of the South." McClure's Magazine, October 1909: 617-632
- "Pellagra: the Medical Mystery of To-day." McClure's Magazine, November 1909: 94–103.
- "Preventable Blindness." Co-written with Carolyn Conant Van Blarcom, McClure's Magazine, April 1910: 619–628.
- "The Confessions of a Sometime Kindergartner." Collier's: The National Weekly, September 24, 1910: 22, 28-29.
- Anonymous. "The Autobiography of a Small Wyoming Homesteader." The Saturday Evening Post, November 25, 1911.
- "A Woman Justice of the Peace." The Saturday Evening Post, December 30, 1911: 9.
- Anonymous. "The Autobiography of a Remittance Man." The Saturday Evening Post, October 19, 1912: 13.
- "The Book Not Written By Human Hands." Fort Wayne Journal-Gazette, March 17, 1918: 43.
- "The Art of Staying Young." People's Favorite Magazine, April 1921
- "Have You Had Your Iodin?" The Delineator, Vol 105, No. 4, October 1924: 19.

Short fiction

- "The Deciding Silence." Everybody's, November 1905: 589.
- "An Elopement." The Delineator, February 1908: 272.
- "The Bond." The Housekeeper, January 1909.
- "Just Because." Cincinnati Commercial Tribune, March 21, 1909: 25. (republication of "An Elopement" with 1909 copyright.)
- "Grasshopper Green." Woman's Home Companion, June 1909.
- "The Little Harmonizer of his Three-fold Nature." McClure's Magazine, July 1909: 294–301.
- " 'Taters.'" The Saturday Evening Post, March 30, 1912: 12.
- "The Proving of Kinky Larkin." Colliers: The National Weekly, April 6, 1912: 17.
- "The Gentleman Doll." Woman's Home Companion, August 1912: 40.
- "The Wooing of 'Holy Calm.'" The Century Magazine, December 1912: 218.
- Anonymous. "The Woman With Empty Hands: The Evolution of a Suffragette." The Saturday Evening Post, January 25, 1913: 13-15, 53-58.
- "Pie-Colored Horse." The Century Magazine, February 1913: 517.
- "Starlight." The Youth's Companion, February 9, 1922: 96.

Poetry

- "In Lighter Vein: The Cricket." The Century Magazine, January 1911: 479.
