= Frank Leslie's Popular Monthly =

American magazine

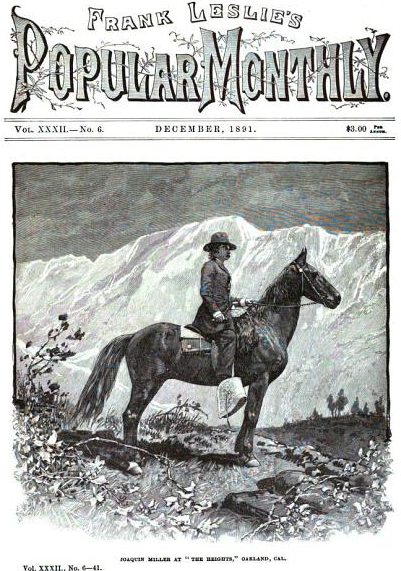
Frank Leslie's Popular Monthly, 1891

Frank Leslie's Popular Monthly (1876–1904) was an American popular literary magazine established by Frank Leslie as "the cheapest magazine published in the world." The publisher was Frank Leslie Pub. House which was based in New York City.

Contributors included Henry James and Eben E. Rexford. In 1905 it was continued by The American Magazine.
