= Elmer Albert Apple =

American writer (1891–1963)

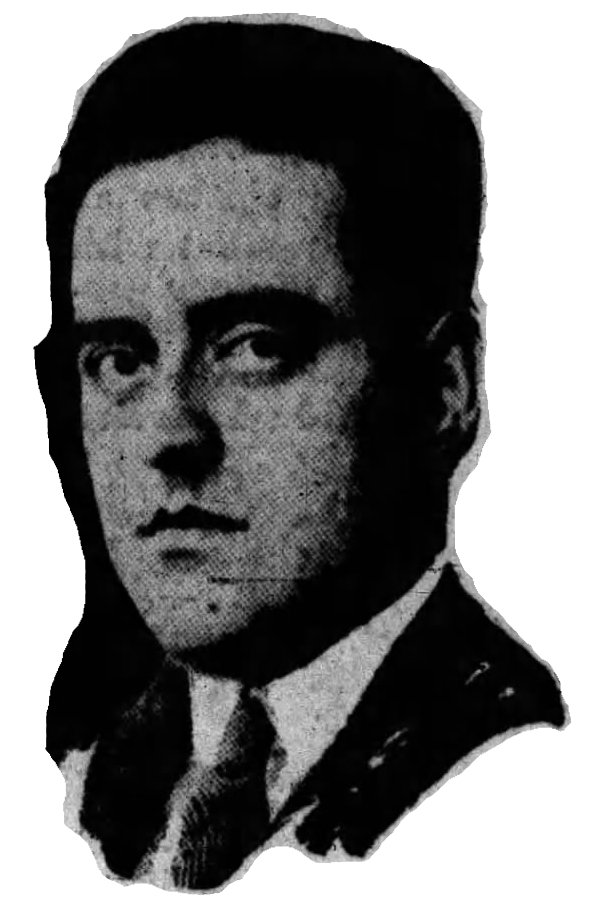
- Apple in 1916
- Born: Elmer Albert Apple; June 6, 1891; Findlay, Ohio
- Died: May 27, 1963 (aged 71); Cleveland, Ohio
- Education: Allegheny College
- Occupations: Mystery author, business journalist, syndicated columnist
- Known for: Mr. Chang stories
- Height: 6 ft 1 in (185 cm)

Elmer Albert Apple was an American author, best known for the popular Mr. Chang stories in Detective Story Magazine (1919–31), published under the byline A. E. Apple. Chang was a Yellow Peril crime master operating out of Canada. From 1920 to 1925, Apple was a nationally syndicated columnist under the byline Albert Apple, many of his columns headed The Referee. His early work (1913–19), for a variety of newspapers and magazines, including much business journalism, appeared under the bylines Elmer A. Apple, Albert E. Apple, and E. Albert Apple. His varied writing identities were never publicly linked.

== Biography ==
Elmer Albert Apple was the son of Charles Barnabas Apple (1864–1936) and Minnie Dorrion Apple (1869–1901). He was a middle brother, between Charles Merle Apple (1886–1931) and Clarence Leslie Apple (1896–1966). Minnie died in 1901 after a lengthy illness; Charles B. Apple married Anna Stein Hazlett (1868–) in 1903.

Charles B. Apple and his brother James L. Apple (~1858–1916) were prominent in the oil business, particularly during the Ohio Oil Rush which started in 1885. For many years, Charles managed the Oil Well Supply Company store in Lima, Ohio, a center of the boom. E. A. Apple grew up in Lima. Detective Story Magazine reported in 1928:

[Apple] lived most of his life in boom oil towns. From working in the oil country and serving as shipping clerk in a brass works, to selling advertising on the road, Apple finally arrived at the point where he wanted to write fiction. His first short story was sold when he was but nineteen.

E. A. Apple graduated in 1908 from Lima High School, where he excelled as an orator. In 1909, he attended the private liberal arts school Allegheny College, in Meadville, Pennsylvania. He didn't stay long and never graduated. In 1910, he worked as a shipping clerk for his father's store. The initial short story sale, ca. 1910, has not been identified.

He soon joined the staff of the Cleveland Press, then the Indianapolis Star. His first known bylined work was an article on the business outlook for the upcoming year in the January 3, 1913 Cleveland Press. He impressed his colleagues by landing a short story, “Darcy Klaw,” a tale of the newspaper business, in the April 1913 American Magazine. It was followed by “Andy Reagan, Successful Failure,” an oil industry story, in the November issue. He may have had an in to The American. It was edited at that time by Ida Tarbell, co-owner of the magazine, noted muckraking journalist, expert on the oil industry, and an Allegheny College alumnus. Between 1913 and 1917, Apple's known record only shows one published piece of fiction.

In 1913, he was advertising manager for the Indianapolis Bank Note Company, and edited its journal Bank Notes. In 1916, he was managing editor of a string of trade magazines published in Cleveland.

Beginning in 1917, he published a number of short stories in The Popular Magazine. In 1919, he published “Mr. Chang” in Detective Story (September 9), the first of the series that he's best known for. For the rest of his fiction career, the vast majority of his work appeared in Detective Story. Chang would appear in 32 stories.

On September 10, 1919, Apple married Canadian-born Beatrice Nixon (1895–1983), almost to the day when “Mr. Chang” was published. They had two sons, Barnabus (Barney) William Nixon Apple (1924–2010) and David Nixon Apple (–1963); an infant daughter died in 1928.

From 1920 to 1925, Apple's column The Referee was nationally syndicated; he was also bylined as “business editor” for the Newspaper Enterprise Association syndicate. During this period, his fiction output slackened. Beginning in late 1924, his fiction output accelerated. He appeared in Detective Story every month or two, frequently with his stories illustrated on the cover of the magazine. His views on writing are sparse, but in 1922 he penned an obit for Frederick Van Rensselaer Dey, author of many stories about fictional detective Nick Carter. Apple wrote:

It takes a master brain and a phenomenally active thyroid gland to be so prolific in brain creations, always with a fresh viewpoint. . . . The present generation would be better off if it read Nick Carter and even the namby-pamby Rollo stories instead of the modern flood of erotic and decadent, trashy sex fiction.

The Apples' son Barney was born on January 29, 1924, by which time the family was living in Toronto. Barney recalled "his father going to the shed in the back of the house which he called the jail to do his writing. His mother edited the work before submitting the manuscripts for publication. Barney remembers visiting San Diego and San Francisco with his father to research the Chinese tongs for his creative writing."

In 1927, Apple started another series in Detective Story featuring “Rafferty,” the name apparently adapted from E. W. Hornung's fictional character Raffles. The first entry was “Rafferty, Master Rogue” (October 1, 1927). Rafferty would appear in 19 stories. Eventually, he met Mr. Chang in two of them.

In 1930, the family lived in Cleveland. The May 23, 1931, issue of Detective Story published “Mr. Chang Meets the Devil,” Apple's last story for a year. In a letter published in the January 2, 1932 Detective Story, Apple mentioned suffering a “long illness.” In 1932, Detective Story published his last two original stories (April 30, July 2).

In 1933, Beatrice Apple moved her husband into Hawthornden State Hospital, a mental institution in Sagamore Hills, near Cleveland. Barney noted that he wrote no more. The 1940 and 1950 U.S. Censuses record Apple, respectively, as an "inmate" and a "patient" at Hawthornden. (The 1960 Census is not available.) In 1935, Writer’s Review columnist Mort Weisinger, accounting for Apple's disappearance from the magazines, reported that he had committed suicide two years prior, a rumor that outlived his actual death on May 27, 1963, in Cleveland.

== Selected fiction ==
- “Darcy Klaw,” The American Magazine, April 1913 [newspaper story]
- “Andy Reagan, Successful Failure,” The American Magazine, November 1913 [oil industry theme]
- “Mysteria, the Mind Reader,” The Popular Magazine, April 20, 1918
- “Mr. Chang,” Detective Story Magazine, September 9, 1919 [first Mr. Chang story]
- “The White Devil,” Adventure, October 10, 1922
- “A Christmas Story,” Piqua Daily Call (Ohio), December 24, 1924
- “Mr. Chang and the Crime Ray,” Detective Story, April 9, 1927
- “Rafferty, Master Rogue,” Detective Story, October 1, 1927 [first Rafferty story]
- “Captured by Man Apes,” Excitement, September 1930
- “Mr. Chang vs. Rafferty,” Detective Story, January 31, 1931 [first Chang/Rafferty meeting]
- “Mr. Chang Cages Rafferty,” Street & Smith’s Detective Story, February 28, 1931 [last Rafferty]
- “Mr. Chang Meets the Devil,” Street & Smith’s Detective Story, May 23, 1931 [last Chang]
- “Stolen Honor,” Street & Smith’s Detective Story, July 2, 1932 [last known original story]
- “The Evil Mr. Chang,” Best Detective Magazine, April 1933 [reprint]

== Books by A. E. Apple ==
- Mr. Chang of Scotland Yard (New York: Chelsea House, 1926)
- Mr. Chang’s Crime Ray (Chelsea House, 1928)
