= The American Magazine =

US periodical, 1906–1956

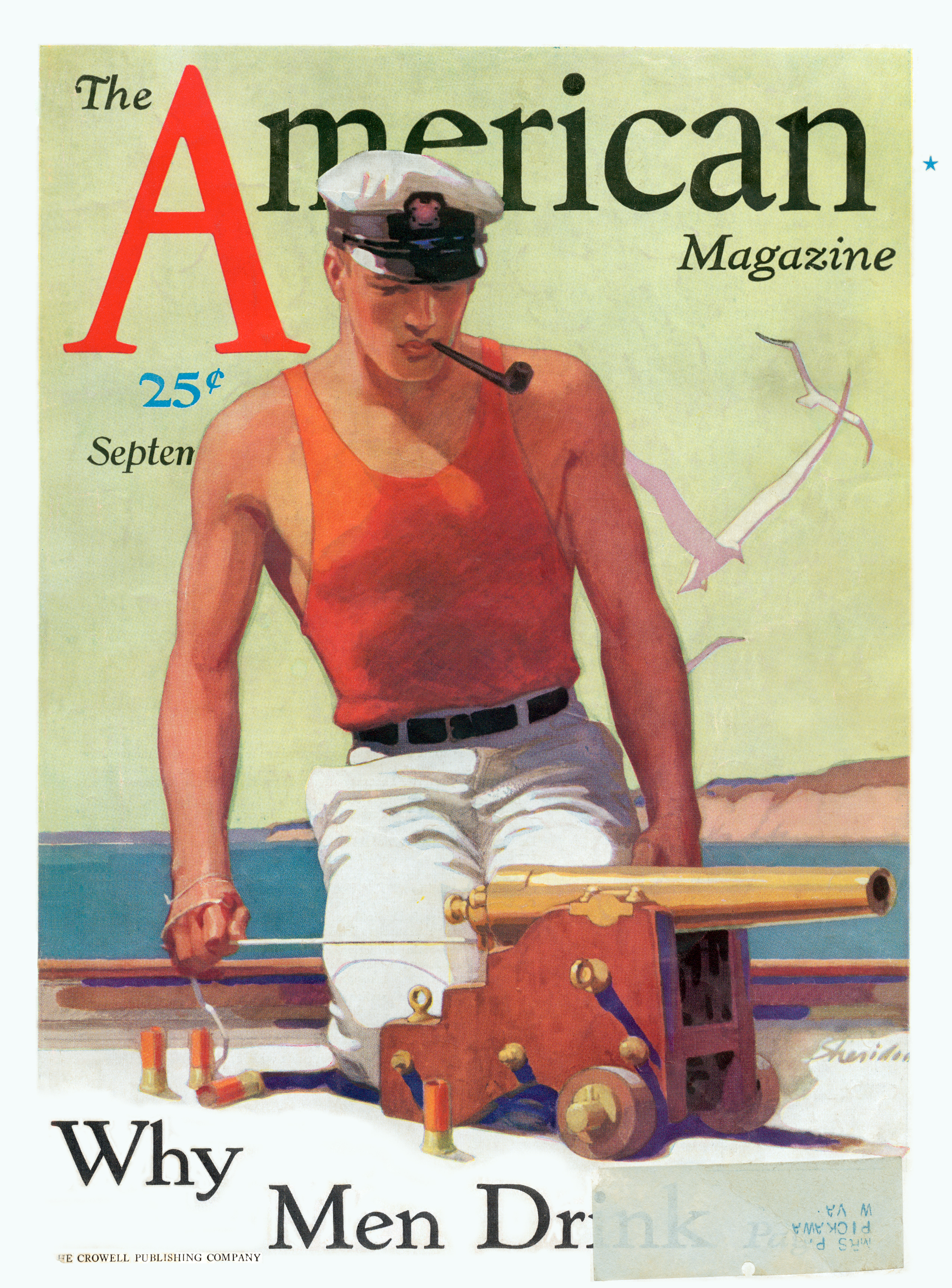
- John E. Sheridan (1880–1948) illustration of Joseph Cotten (September 1931)
- First issue: June 1906; 120 years ago
- Final issue: August 1956; 70 years ago
- Country: United States
- Language: English
- ISSN: 2155-7225

The American Magazine was a periodical publication founded in June 1906, a continuation of failed publications purchased a few years earlier from publishing mogul Miriam Leslie. It succeeded Frank Leslie's Popular Monthly (1876–1904), Leslie's Monthly Magazine (1904–1905), Leslie's Magazine (1905) and the American Illustrated Magazine (1905–1906). The magazine was published through August 1956.

== History ==
Under the magazine's original title, Frank Leslie's Popular Monthly, it had begun to be published in 1876 and was renamed Leslie's Monthly Magazine in 1904, and then was renamed again as Leslie's Magazine in 1905. From September 1905, through May 1906, it was entitled the American Illustrated Magazine; then subsequently shortened as The American Magazine until publication ceased in 1956. It kept continuous volume numbering throughout its history.

In June 1906, muckraking journalists Ray Stannard Baker, Lincoln Steffens and Ida M. Tarbell left McClure's to help create The American Magazine. An "Editorial Announcement" published in 1907 led with Tarbell's coverage of tariff policy. Baker contributed articles using the pseudonym David Grayson. Under John Sanborn Phillips, who served as editor until 1915, the monthly magazine departed somewhat from the muckraking style and focused on human interest stories, social issues and fiction. Initially published by his Phillips Publishing Company of Springfield, Ohio, it later was taken over by Crowell Publishing Company in 1911, and later merged with Collier's. The American Magazine was published by Crowell-Collier until it folded in 1956.

== Editors ==
With the changes in 1915, John M. Siddall (1915–23) was appointed as editor of the periodical, which expanded its market considerably by concentrating on a female readership. The cover of the September 1917 issue announced: "This Magazine's Circulation Has Doubled in 20 Months." The September 1922 cover stated circulation had reached 1.8 million.

Merle Crowell served as editor of The American Magazine from 1923 until 1929 when Sumner Blossom took over. Blossom, who had been editor of Popular Science, was there for the last 27 years of the magazine's existence. Fictional serials and short stories were a popular feature, and the magazine published several winners of the O. Henry Awards. High-profile writers contributed articles on a variety of topics.

During his editorship, Blossom adopted the policy of hiding the author's name on all works of fiction during the selection process as a way to encourage new fiction writers. The magazine's staff learned the author's identity only once they accepted or rejected a manuscript.

The last issue of The American Magazine was displayed on newsstands in August 1956.

== Stories ==
In 1934, The American Magazine ran a story called "Uncle Sam Grows Younger" that praised Alger Hiss: "In his twenties, he is one of the men chiefly responsible for the plan to buy $650,000,000 worth of commodities to feed the unemployed. He has too much spirit for his bodily strength and is in danger of working himself to death."

== Notable contributors ==
- Bess Streeter Aldrich
- Sherwood Anderson
- Harry J. Anslinger
- Elmer Albert Apple
- J. Ogden Armour
- Irving Bacheller
- John Barrymore
- Neith Boyce
- Frances Hodgson Burnett
- Ellis Parker Butler
- Leslie Charteris
- Agatha Christie
- Lincoln Ross Colcord
- Arthur Conan Doyle
- Courtney Ryley Cooper
- Jane Cowl
- Will Durant
- Amelia Earhart
- Edna Ferber
- Lucine Finch
- F. Scott Fitzgerald
- Henry Ford
- Graham Greene
- Zane Grey
- Dashiell Hammett
- Eric Hatch
- Syd Hoff
- Kin Hubbard
- Clarence Budington Kelland
- Harry Kemp
- Jack Lait
- Munro Leaf
- Walter Lippmann
- William J. Locke
- John A. Moroso
- Albert Jay Nock
- Kathleen Norris
- Vance Packard
- William Dudley Pelley
- General John J. Pershing
- Channing Pollock
- Olive Higgins Prouty
- Mary Roberts Rinehart
- Grantland Rice
- Franklin D. Roosevelt
- Upton Sinclair
- Rex Stout
- Thomas Joseph Sugrue
- Booth Tarkington
- Frederick Winslow Taylor
- S. S. Van Dine
- H. G. Wells
- Paul R. Williams
- Peter Dale Wimbrow
- P. G. Wodehouse
- Harold Bell Wright
