= McClure's =

American illustrated monthly periodical (1893–1929)

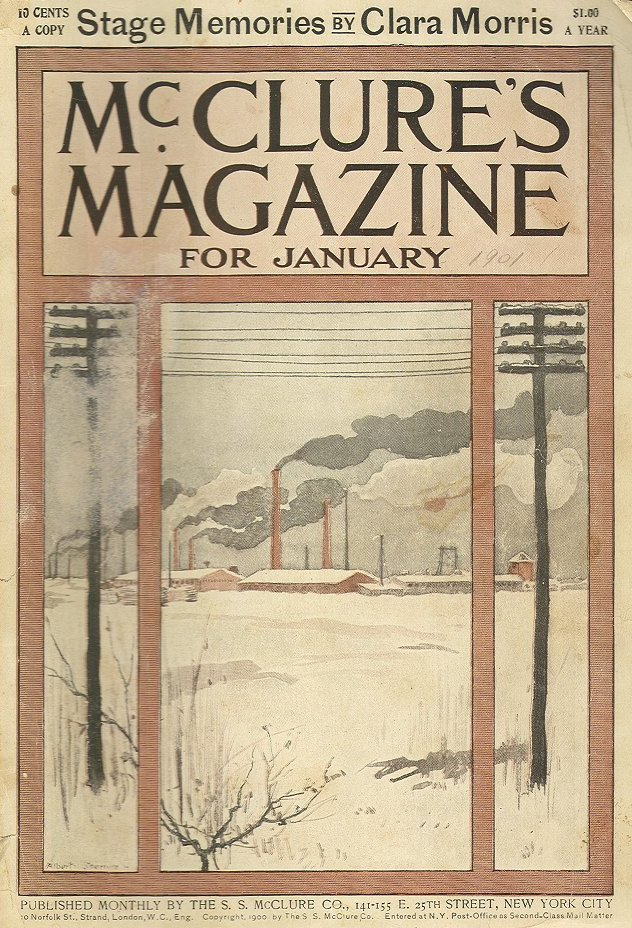
- Cover of January 1901 issue
- Categories: Muckraking, political, literary (1893–1911); Women's (1921–1929)
- Frequency: Monthly
- Publisher: S. S. McClure (1893–1911)
- Founder: S. S. McClure; John Sanborn Phillips
- First issue: June 1893; 133 years ago
- Final issue: March 1929; 97 years ago
- Country: United States
- Based in: New York City, New York, U.S.

McClure's or McClure's Magazine (1893–1929) was an American illustrated monthly periodical popular at the turn of the 20th century. The magazine is credited with having started the tradition of muckraking journalism (investigative, watchdog, or reform journalism), and helped direct the moral compass of the day.

The publishing company briefly got into the film business with McClure Pictures.

== History ==
Founded by S. S. McClure (1857–1949) and John Sanborn Phillips (1861–1949), who had been classmates at Knox College, in June 1893. Phillips put up the US$7,300 (equivalent to $262,000 in 2025) needed to launch the magazine. The magazine included both political and literary content, publishing serialized novels-in-progress, a chapter at a time. In this way, McClure's published writers including Willa Cather, Arthur Conan Doyle, Herminie T. Kavanagh, Rudyard Kipling, Jack London, Lincoln Steffens, Robert Louis Stevenson, and Mark Twain.

At the beginning of the 20th century, its major competitors included Collier's and the Saturday Evening Post.

Examples of its work include Ida Tarbell's series in 1902 exposing the monopoly abuses of John D. Rockefeller's Standard Oil Company, and Ray Stannard Baker's earlier look at the United States Steel Corporation, which focused the public eye on the conduct of corporations. From January 1907 to June 1908, McClure's published the first detailed history of Christian Science and the story of its founder, Mary Baker Eddy (1821–1910) in 14 installments. The articles were later published in book form as The Life of Mary Baker G. Eddy and the History of Christian Science (1909).

In 1906 three staffers left to form The American Magazine. Shortly thereafter McClure's found itself in financial trouble, in part because a publishing plant the company was building for a planned cost of $105,000 (equivalent to $3,760,000 in 2025) ultimately cost over three times that amount. Advertising revenue had also fallen. By 1911 S.S. McClure had lost control of the company, and was forced to sell the magazine to creditors. In 1916 the magazine published the First McClure Automobile Year Book, with the specifications and pictures of over 100 different major manufacturers of passenger and commercial vehicles. The magazine was re-styled as a women's magazine and ran inconsistently in this format, with publication paused from October 1921 to February 1922, September 1924 to April 1925, and February 1926 to May 1926. Issues from July 1928 were published under the name New McClure's Magazine; the last issue was in March 1929, after which the magazine was taken over by The Smart Set.

== McClure Pictures ==
=== Filmography ===
- The Seven Deadly Sins (1917), a series
- The Fighting Roosevelts, renamed Our Teddy after the death of Teddy Roosevelt
- Mother

== Writers and editors ==
=== Staff ===
- Ray Stannard Baker
- Witter Bynner
- Willa Cather
- Burton J. Hendrick
- Will Irwin
- S. S. McClure
- Lincoln Steffens
- Mark Sullivan
- Ida Tarbell
- William Allen White
- Marion Hamilton Carter
- John Sanborn Phillips
- George Kibbe Turner

=== Other contributors ===
- J. M. Barrie
- Stephen Crane
- Arthur Conan Doyle
- Herminie T. Kavanagh
- Rudyard Kipling
- Bruno Lessing
- Jack London
- Georgine Milmine
- Frank Norris
- Emmeline Pankhurst
- Marjorie Pickthall (1900s–1910s)
- Frank Crane (1861–1928), Presbyterian minister, speaker, and columnist
- Robert Louis Stevenson
- Mark Twain
