= Alfred Thomas Story =

British writer

Alfred Thomas Story (1842–1934) was an English journalist, poet and author of numerous books. He was born in North Cave, in the county of York, the fourth child in the large family of James Story. His family was an old Durham branch of the Northumbrian Story family. His father, a property-owner and keen amateur musician, composer and poet, died when his son was about ten years of age. He was educated in Manchester, studying for some time at Owen's College.

He began his career as a provincial journalist and became the sub-editor of Human Nature, a monthly periodical to which he contributed his first poems. Subsequently, he went to Germany to study. He spent two years in Switzerland acting as foreign sub-editor of the Swiss Times, published at first in Geneva and afterwards in Paris as the Continental Times. Returning to England, he worked for several years in the provincial press, part of this time on the Northampton Mercury. Settling in London, he contributed, during the ensuing years, to many newspapers and literary periodicals. He was a sometime editor of The Phrenological Magazine and published two books on the now discredited subject of phrenology.

During his long life, he produced numerous books. These include biographies (The Life of John Linnell, William Ewart Gladstone and his Contemporaries, William Blake, his Life, Character and Genius, James Holmes and John Varley); local histories (Historical Legends of Northamptonshire, American Shrines in England); literary essays (Books that are the Hearts of Men, A Book of Vagrom Men and Vagrant Thoughts); popular science works (Wireless Telegraphy, The Story of Photography); history (The Building of the Empire); economics (The Martyrdom of Labour); travel (Swiss Life in Town and Country, North Wales); public school fiction (Boys of St. Elmos); romances (Only Half a Hero, Fifine) and poetry (The Northern Cross and Other Poems, The Trumpeter of the Dawn and Other Poems).

== Sources ==
- Storeys of Old

== Selected electronic texts ==
- Alfred Thomas Story
- Articles in Harper's Magazine
