= Thomas Thursday =

American writer (1894–1974)

Thomas Thursday (1894–1974) was a lesser-known pulp writer who had one of the longest careers writing for the pulp magazines. His first published short story, "A Stroke of Genius," appeared in Top-Notch (April 1, 1918). He submitted the story to them after finding an old issue in the subway. He used the penname "Thursday" after glancing at a calendar. His real name remains a mystery. He was still appearing in the pulps in the late 1950s, after which the magazine format all but disappeared from the newsstands.

Thursday was primarily a humorist, one of the few in the pulps. He appeared regularly in Top-Notch through the mid-1920s, then transitioned to Argosy. Many of his story titles featured wordplay, e.g. "Illiterature" (People's Favorite Magazine, April 10, 1919), "Young Mild West" (Argosy All-Story Weekly, February 28, 1925), "Of Lice and Men" (The Phantom Detective, September 1940). Many of his stories centered on circuses and sideshows. Thursday had worked for numerous circuses in his youth. Swindles and scams were a frequent theme.

During the early Depression, his career seemed to peter out for a few years. Likely, with the increasing specialization in pulp magazines, the market for general humor became too narrow. Thursday resurfaced in the mid-1930s, adding a number of other specialties to his repertoire. He wrote humorous sports stories for the growing sports pulp field; straightforward detective stories; and articles for the true-crime magazine market. The true-crime stories all concerned Miami, Florida cases, where he had relocated (from New York) in the late-1920s. He was never one of the prolific fictioneers, so it's likely he wrote on the side.

Throughout his career, Thursday frequently published articles in writers' magazines like Writer's Digest and The Author & Journalist. Though always amusing, these how-to articles took on an increasingly bitter tone, as Thursday became more and more disgusted with the hardships of the writing business, especially the collapse of word-rates after the onset of the Depression. He reserved his most severe wrath for the pulp magazine editors, who he dubbed "idiotors."

Thursday published true-crime article into the late 1960s. He was a columnist for the Miami Police News until it folded in late 1967.
