= Yandere Simulator =

Upcoming stealth action video game

- Developer: YandereDev
- Designer: Alex Mahan
- Programmer: Alex Mahan
- Artists: Mulberry; Kjech; JIBJAB
- Writer: Alex Mahan
- Composer: CameronF305
- Engine: Unity
- Platform: Windows
- Release: 2014–2019 (pre-release); 2020 (full demo); 2021 (1980s Mode); TBA (wide release)
- Genres: Stealth, action, visual novel
- Mode: Single-player

Yandere Simulator is an upcoming stealth action video game developed by YandereDev for Windows. The story follows obsessively lovesick schoolgirl Ayano Aishi, nicknamed "Yandere-chan", who takes it upon herself to eliminate (through either violent or non-violent means) anyone she believes attracting the attention of her "senpai", Taro Yamada. A 1980s-set prequel game mode, Yandere Simulator: 1980s Mode, following the similar story of Ayano's parents, was soft-launched on October 10, 2021. The non-canon Yandere Simulator: Mission Mode follows Ayano as an assassin pursued by a hunter named Nemesis.

The game began development in 2014 by YandereDev, an American independent game studio led by Alex Mahan, previously known for work as associate designer of the fighting game Girl Fight. The game achieved a considerable amount of attention online the following year, leading to millions of downloads of pre-release versions of the game, as well as crossovers and spin-offs. The game has endured a lengthy development and been subject to several controversies.

== Plot and gameplay ==
Yandere-chan (Ayano Aishi) with high sanity (above) and low sanity (below). Performing murder results in loss of sanity, making Yandere-chan look increasingly disturbed and unstable, with the game's graphics and background music also reflecting the changes.

=== 202X Mode ===
In 202X Mode, the player controls Ayano Aishi (nicknamed Yandere-chan; voiced by Michaela Laws), an apathetic monoromantic asexual student (Note: While Akademi was a High School at first, its status was promoted to a post-high school Academy later in development.) who has developed a crush on 18-year-old Taro/Taeko Yamada (voiced by Austin Hively as a boy – Taro – and by Laws as a girl – Taeko – depending on the gender the player chooses for them), a student only ever referred to in game as "Senpai", believing Taro/Taeko to be the treatment to her "Aishi Condition", an inherited condition causing the women of her family not to feel emotion until they find their love at first sight. Over the course of ten weeks (whilst Ayano's parents are out of town tracking down "The Journalist"), a different girl will fall in love with Taro/Taeko each week, becoming a target for Ayano to "eliminate" with the help of the anonymous information broker, Info-chan (voiced by Cayla Martin, Megan Souza, and Amberleigh Elderweb).

The player has the ability to kidnap, torture, poison, electrocute, matchmake, befriend, betray, frame, and drown rivals – Osana Najimi (voiced by Brittany Lauda), Amai Odayaka (voiced by Kimberley Anne Campbell), Kizana Sunobu (voiced by Katelyn Barr), Asu Rito, Nurse Muja Kina, and Hanako Yamada/Nemesis (all voiced by Dawn M. Bennett), substitute teacher Mida Rana (voiced by Marissa Lenti), Osoro Shidesu (voiced by Alexis Silvera), and Megami Saikou (voiced by AmaLee), befriend other schoolmates – including Student Council Secretary Akane Toriyasu and vampire Inkyu Basu (both voiced by Kira Buckland), Kokona Haruka/Generica and Oka Ruto (both voiced by Caitlin Myers), Student Council Vice-President Kuroko Kamenaga and succubus Sakyu Basu (both voiced by Kayli Mills), and Drama Club member Riku Soma (voiced by Jonah Scott), as well as ghost Fun Girl Saikou (voiced by Yuko Sakura), and guidance counselors Mae and Genka Kunahito and (all voiced by Lenti), play small minigames, earn money by playing a maid café minigame, spend money at shops to buy items – and more.

=== 1980s Mode ===
Yandere Simulator: 1980s Mode, set in 1989, centers upon Ryoba (voiced by Michaela Laws), the future mother of Ayano, who as an 18-year-old had become obsessed with a popular Akademi Academy student named Jokichi Yudasei (voiced by Austin Hively), the future father of Ayano, to treat her own "Aishi Condition". The features VHS effects and a new soundtrack to differentiate it from the main story. Ten rivals stand in her way and a journalist is watching her every move, aware of her homicidal tendencies. To prevent detection, Ryoba must plan her moves out carefully. If she acts suspiciously or does not clean up after her murders properly she will gain a "guilty" point. She can counteract these by befriending fellow students and maintaining a good reputation. The Journalist (voiced by Bradley Gareth) eventually brings Ryoba to court after eliminating her rivals; if she has collected more guilty points than innocent ones she will be found guilty and imprisoned. If found innocent she will kidnap Jokichi and keep him in her basement until he agrees to enter into a relationship with her. In the secret and canonical, "S+" ending (unlocked by eliminating each rival a certain way), it's shown that after being kidnapped by Ryoba, Jokichi was then kidnapped by Saisho Saikou, founder of Saikou Corp, who had Ryoba go through a "test" before he was returned to her.

=== Mission Mode ===
Yandere Simulator: Mission Mode is a non-canon storyline and a parody of Hitman where-in Ayano is an assassin hired by Info-chan on behalf of the yakuza to kill various targets around Akademi Academy (with Taro/Taeko being her first victim), pursued by a rival female assassin known as Nemesis (voiced by Dawn M. Bennett). In Yakuza Mode, the highest difficulty setting of Mission Mode, Ryoba is playable instead of Ayano, depicted as a fully-dressed yakuza with katana in-hand.

== Development ==
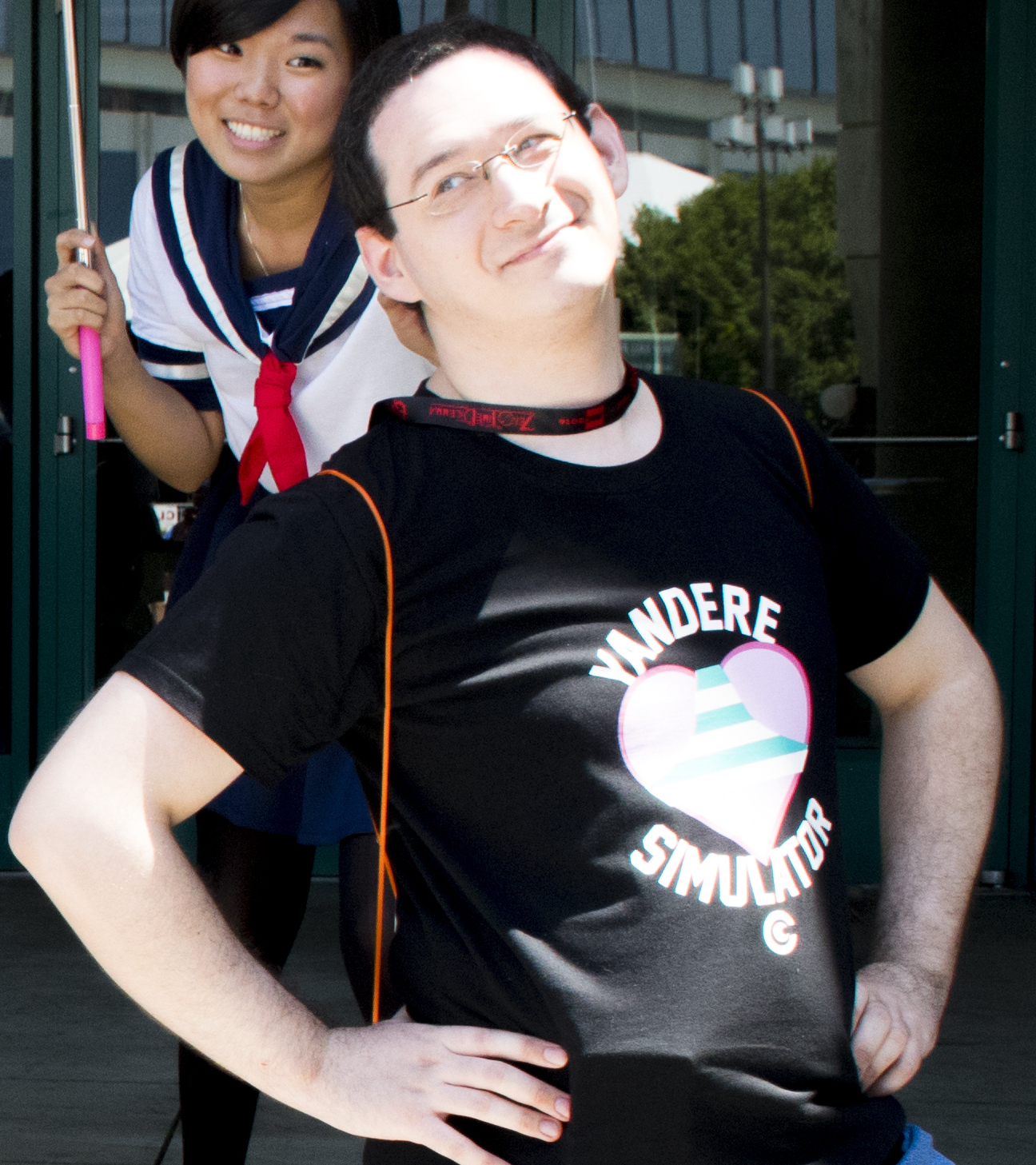
Developer Alex Mahan in 2016

=== 2010s ===
Yandere Simulator is developed by YandereDev, a freelance game developer run by Alex Mahan and based in Temecula, California. Then-associate designer of the fighting game Girl Fight, he first pitched the idea on 4chan around 2014, and after receiving positive feedback, decided to begin development. Mahan has stated that the series Mirai Nikki, Persona, Hitman and School Days were inspirations for the game. To work on the game full-time, Mahan opened a Patreon account in 2016; he has stated that prior to this he worked as a freelance programmer.

On November 16, 2016, a non-canon Mission Mode was released; a parody of Hitman, the mode follows the assassin Ayano Aishi as she is hired to kill various targets around Akademi Academy, pursued by a rival female assassin known as Nemesis.

From March to December 2017, YandereDev partnered with tinyBuild to help him polish, promote, and publish the game, the partnership ending due to tinyBuild's programmer and Mahan conflicting.

=== 2020s ===
On August 31, 2020, the game's first demo was released along with Ayano's first rival, Osana Najimi.

On October 10, 2021, a prequel game, Yandere Simulator: 1980s Mode, was released. This game is a story mode that follows Ayano Aishi's mother, Ryoba Aishi, and follows the same storyline as the main story, inspired by 1980s slasher films. The developer has stated that this game was created to test the main game's various systems.

In September 2023, after an allegation was brought against Mahan by a friend of a 16-year-old girl claiming that he had been grooming her and releasing a recording and transcript of their conversation, several of the game's developers and voice actors, including Ayano's voice actress Michaela Laws, left the project. In January 2024, Mahan apologised for the "inappropriate" conversation that had occurred, stating that "I did not attempt to establish a romantic or sexual relationship with the girl [but] after having my behaviour explained to me as commonly associated with romance, I can understand how it was interpreted that way [and am] sorry for having stupid, inappropriate conversations I never should have had", and that on opening a dialogue with the girl in question, Yandere Simulator would resume development.

On March 31, 2024, on the 10th anniversary of Yandere Simulator, YandereDev estimated that the final game "would come out towards the end of 2026, or maybe the beginning of 2027". On May 1, 2024, YandereDev released Ayano's second rival, Amai Odayaka.

YandereDev released "The Hardware Update", adding an in-game store at which to spend in-game currency on items on July 15, 2024. YandereDev released the 1980s Revamp on October 21, 2024, giving the characters of 1980s Mode "a completely new appearance". On October 31, 2024, YandereDev announced the return of voice acting and the addition of visual novel features to the game, along with confirming the game's "supernatural elements" to factor into the main story mode.

On January 1, 2025, YandereDev announced that the game would be ported to be playable on Android.

== Crossovers ==
On May 24, 2015, Pippi Osu, mascot from the rhythm game osu!, was added to Yandere Simulator as a NPC student of Akademi Academy, with Samantha Chan reprising her role, with permission from the game's creator Dean Lewis "peppy" Herbert.

On October 25, 2016, Yandere-chan (Ayano Aishi) and Generica (Kokona Haruka) were added as characters in the anime-style idle dating sim Crush Crush, with Michaela Laws and Caitlin Myers reprising their roles, while the cast of Crush Crush were added to Yandere Simulator as playable character skins. Within the narrative of the game, after Ayano (later renamed "Ayeka" after the Yandere Simulator licensing ended in 2023, as a parody composite character with Monika from Doki Doki Literature Club!) kills the original eighth girl Generica, she begins to date the player, with her primary weapon being a baseball bat. Generica later returns as a ghost to become frenemies with Ayano/Ayeka, who the player may also romance.

In July 2017, Yandere-chan (Ayano Aishi) was added as a character in the open-source online strip poker simulator Strip Poker Night at the Inventory. In the game, Ayano is among the many characters the player character can play strip poker with.

On January 1, 2018, the main characters of Doki Doki Literature Club! (Monika, Sayori, Yuri, and Natsuki) were added to Yandere Simulator as playable character skins for Ryoba and Ayano Aishi, with permission from Team Salvato.

On January 9, 2019, Yandere-chan (Ayano Aishi) was added as a playable character to the fighting video game Go All Out! on the Nintendo Switch, with Michaela Laws reprising her role. In her narrative, she is presented as having been isekaied into the realm of the game during the events of Yandere Simulator, aiming to kill Calamity to return to her Senpai.

On December 28, 2019, it was announced the characters from Yandere Simulator would be added as playable characters to the puzzle and action role-playing game Project QT early the following year, with Ayano Aishi (renamed Patti in a 2023 update) and Info-chan (renamed Emily in a 2023 update) ultimately being chosen via poll, with Michaela Laws and Cayla Martin reprising their roles. In the game's narrative, Ayano is presented as having been isekaied into the realm of the game years after the events of Yandere Simulator, before mistaking the Project QT protagonist for her Senpai.

In March 2020, Osana Najimi was added as a playable character to the visual novel game Triple Treat by Screampunk Arts (later Nitropunk Arts) with permission from YanderDev, published via Mega through files made available at their DeviantArt page.

On June 24, 2020, Yandere-chan (Ayano Aishi) and Nemesis (Hanako Yamada) were added as playable characters to the French third-person shooter game BITC (Boobs in the City), with Michaela Laws and Dawn M. Bennett reprising their roles. In the game's narrative, Yandere-chan is depicted as an axe-wielding underclassman to the protagonist Coach, aiming to keep all other girls from him, while Nemesis is depicted as being "an artificial lifeform sent from the future to save Coach's life".

A Yandere Simulator DLC was added to the multiplayer horror party game Dark Deception: Monsters & Mortals by Glowstick Entertainment on June 28, 2023, featuring a Yandere Simulator map with Fun Girl as the boss of Boss Time, Police Officers as the bosses of Trap Time, as well as Senpai (Taro Yamada), Info-chan, and Nemesis (Hanako Yamada) as playable mortal characters, and Ayano Aishi as a playable monster character, with Austin Hively, Cayla Martin, Dawn M. Bennett, and Michaela Laws reprising their roles, Bennett via archival audio.

== Critical response ==
=== Content and themes ===
The game has received criticism over its content and themes, with the most common criticism centering upon the presence of sexuality and murder. In their 2022 doctoral dissertation, Kristian A. Bjørkelo noted that some hearing about or playing the game found it transgressive due to the themes of sexuality and murder, while others took more exception to an update that would allow players to kill cats as a way of avoiding police detection. They further noted that Yandere Simulator was an example of a game that conflicted with "the idea that play is harmless fun, something that can be considered for children, a notion that can be referred to as the idealization of play... or the fallacy of play".

Cecilia D'Anastasio, writing for Kotaku, covered the debug version in a 2017 article; she commented that the game had received criticism for "glamorizing suicide, bullying and Bipolar Disorder—allegations that I strongly agree with, despite the game's merits as simulator for sociopathy." D'Anastasio went on to interview Mahan in the same article, who stated that the game "pivots on the archetype of an obsessed, violent stalker, rather than female stereotypes."

=== Twitch ban ===
In January 2016, Yandere Simulator was added to the list of games that are disallowed for play over the streaming platform Twitch. Mahan was a vocal critic of the ban, claiming that Twitch never explained what prompted its addition to the list and that he would have been willing to "modify minor, innocuous things that were never meant to be the focus of the game, but I would not be willing to remove gameplay mechanics, remove core features, or change the focus of the game", further criticizing the ban as a result of "self-righteous ideologies".
