= Saori (disambiguation) =

Saori is a feminine Japanese given name.

Saori may also refer to:

- Saori, Aichi, a former town in Ama District, Aichi Prefecture, Japan
- Saori (video game), a 1991 video game
- Saori (television personality), Japanese-Korean television personality

== See also ==
- Saori@destiny, Japanese musician
