= List of fictional dictators =

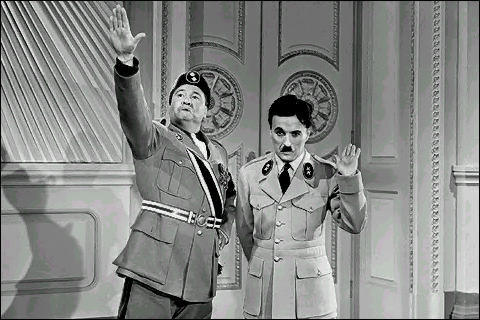
Adenoid Hinkle (played by Charlie Chaplin) and Napaloni (played by Jack Oakie) parody of Adolf Hitler and Benito Mussolini, respectively, in The Great Dictator

In fiction, dictatorship has sometimes been portrayed as the political system of choice for controlling dystopian societies in books, video games, TV and movies. Below is a list of fictional dictators.

Character	Location	Organization	In	Notes	Ref
Big Brother	Oceania	Ingsoc	Nineteen Eighty-Four	Supposedly the ruler of the totalitarian continents, although whether he truly exists or is simply a fictional personification of Ingsoc is unclear. Reference to the USSR.	
President Coriolanus Snow	Panem (present day United States and Canada)	The Capitol of Panem	The Hunger Games	In the future, North America has become a dictatorship, divided into 12 districts. Every year, two children from each district are forced to fight each other in The Hunger Games.	
Adam Susan (called Sutler in the film version)	England, probably also the rest of the United Kingdom	Norsefire Party	V for Vendetta	Dictator and High Chancellor in the V for Vendetta graphic novel and movie. Came to power as a result of a massive terror attack, which was orchestrated by him in the plot. Is portrayed as a homophobic, racist and totalitarian. Resembles Adolf Hitler.	
Emperor Sheev Palpatine	Star Wars Galaxy	Sith Order, Galactic Empire, First Order	Star Wars	A Sith Lord who served as Senator of the planet Naboo, Supreme Chancellor of the Galactic Republic and Emperor of both the "Galactic Empire" and the First Order (the latter in secret). Possible reference to Hitler's title Chancellor of Germany, Napoleon's transformation to an empire, Ferdinand Marcos Sr. and Alberto Fujimori's strict demeanor, and Richard Nixon's political rule	
Supreme Leader Snoke	Star Wars Galaxy	First Order	Star Wars	Supreme Leader of the First Order during the events of The Force Awakens and most of The Last Jedi, responsible for seducing Kylo Ren to the Dark Side of the Force.	
Supreme Leader Kylo Ren	Star Wars Galaxy	First Order	Star Wars	Supreme Leader of the First Order following his assassination of Snoke in The Last Jedi. He is the grandson of Anakin Skywalker / Darth Vader.	
Doctor Doom	Latveria	Masters of Evil	Marvel Universe	Doctor Doom is the self-proclaimed ruler of Latveria, a country located in Eastern Europe, and the arch enemy of the Fantastic Four.	
Kingpin	New York City	Kingpin's Criminal Empire	Marvel Universe	Kingpin was voted for Mayor of New York City. He left office following the events of "Devil's Reign".	
Kang the Conqueror	Chronopolis; Quantum Realm (MCU)	Kang's Empire	Marvel Universe	Kang the Conqueror is a multiversal conqueror.	
President Shinra	Gaia	Shinra Electric Power Company	Final Fantasy VII	The initial president of Shinra, responsible for the destruction of Midgar's Sector 7 in an attempt to eliminate the terrorist organisation Avalanche.	
Rufus Shinra	Gaia	Shinra Electric Power Company	Final Fantasy VII	Initially serves as vice president, but takes over as Shinra's president after his father's murder at the hands of Sephiroth, who he proceeds to pursue throughout most of the story in his search for the mythical "Promised Land".	
Porky Minch	Nowhere Islands	Pigmask Army	Mother 3	He ended up on the Nowhere Islands by accident from the past, and quickly ended up taking over, committing atrocities such as modifying animals for his own twisted amusement. His end goal is the destruction of what remains of the world so there will be nobody left who dislikes him.	
Fire Lord Sozin	Fire Nation	Fire Kingdom	Avatar: The Last Airbender	Sozin is the Fire Lord who instigated the 100 Year War, under the guise of spreading the Fire Nation's prosperity across the world, as well as the person behind the Air Nomad Genocide.	
Fire Lord Azulon	Fire Nation	Fire Kingdom	Avatar: The Last Airbender	Azulon was killed by the wife of his youngest son Ozai in a conspiracy that would let him take the throne.	
Fire Lord Ozai	Fire Nation	Fire Kingdom	Avatar: The Last Airbender	Ozai is a cruel individual who believes in toxic masculinity and abused both of his children, and had the aim to completely burn down the largest nation in the world, the Earth Kingdom, to make a new Fire Nation rise from its ashes.	
Amon	Republic City	The Equalists	The Legend of Korra	Amon is a terrorist leader with the aim to remove Bending from the world, who briefly assumed control over Republic City.	
Kuvira	Earth Empire	Earth Empire military	The Legend of Korra	Kuvira rose to power during a period of instability in the Earth Kingdom, and became known as the Great Uniter by forcefully bringing the splintered nation back together. Her regime ended during her attempt to conquer Republic City.	
Vaas Montenegro	Rook Islands		Far Cry 3	Although not a politician and an actual dictator, Vaas is one of the main leaders in control of a small island the main protagonist, Jason Brody, incidentally lands on; however, because Vaas is known to be brutal towards the island's native tribe, the Rakyat, where his men constantly engage in ethnic cleansing incidents because of their opposition, he is engaged in a war against the tribe's insurgents.	
Pagan Min	Kyrat		Far Cry 4	He is the self-appointed leader over a nation named Kyrat, located in the Himalayan Mountains.	
Antón Castillo	Yara	Unknown	Far Cry 6	President and dictator of the fictional Caribbean nation of Yara from 2014 to 2021. He came to power democratically after winning the 2014 elections but rules over the island under a military dictatorship before being overthrown by Libertad rebels in 2021.	
Dominus Ghaul	The Tower	The Cabal	Destiny 2	Dominus Ghaul was the self-proclaimed ruler of the Cabal Empire, after the exile of its previous Emperor Calus.	
Napoleon	Manor Farm, England	Animal Farm animals	Animal Farm	A group of animals overthrow their abusive farmer, Mr. Jones, and try to establish an equal society of animals. Later, Napoleon, paralleled to Joseph Stalin seizes power and is repressive. An allegory of the October Revolution in Russia.	
President/Lord Business	LEGO World	Octan	The Lego Movie	A dictator hating creativity and obsessed with control and perfection, to the point he aims to glue the world together.	
Aku	A dystopian retrofuturistic Earth	Black Mass of Darkness	Samurai Jack	A shapeshifting demon from long ago, Aku sends the protagonist, a Samurai Jack to the future before he could land a killing blow. In the distant future, Aku reigns supreme on the planet Earth.	
Prince Karl "Charles" von Waldron	United States	European Confederated Army	The Fall of a Nation	Dictator of the United States.	
President Judd Hammond	United States	Unknown	Gabriel Over the White House	Dictator of the United States.	
General Gurko Lanen	Lichtenburg	Lichtenburg Dictatorship	The Son of Monte Cristo	Dictator of Lichtenburg.	
Julio Ardiente	Poblacion Ardiente, Philippines	Ardiente Dynasty	Wildflower	In a town in the Philippines where a fascistic powerful family gained absolute power and control a wave of bloody murders, corruption and graft in the Ardiente dynasty, terrorist attacks, and scandals within the Ardiente Family has washed over the whole town, A strong-willed woman named Lily Cruz vows to bring down the Ardiente dictatorial rule vowing vengeance for her family's loss. He later meets his demise when he is subjected to human experimentation by another person who faced similar circumstances to Lily Cruz.	
President Maximilian II and later Thorne	Unknown country	Unknown	Land of the Blind	A satirical depiction of dictatorship. Maximilian II was a brutal dictator overthrown by Thorne, played by Donald Sutherland who later turned out to be a worse one. This film parallels Iranian Revolution, as Maximilian resembles Shah of Iran and Thorne resembles the Supreme Leader.	
Digimon Emperor	Digital World	Unknown	Digimon	An evil, despotic alter-ego of the boy genius Digidestined Ken Ichijouji. Abuses and treats his fellow Digimon like slaves, building Control Spires to assert total control over the Digital World, and using a whiplash to whip Digimon who protest his rule.	
Salvador Mendoza	San Esprito	Republic of San Esprito	Just Cause	Took control of San Esprito illegally.	
Pandak Panay	Panau		Just Cause 2	Killed his father in a car bomb who was the leader of Panau. He did so he can get power. He is a fascist.	
Sebastiano Di Ravello	Medici	Medici Military	Just Cause 3	Took dictatorship illegally after President Dantes death and exiled Rosa Manuella who was leading in the polls. Planning domination using Bavirum.	
Oscar Espinosa	Solís	Espinosa Dynasty	Just Cause 4	De facto ruler of Solís, the Espinosa Dynasty has head power for 500 years after conquistador Diego Espinosa created his own kingdom.	
Admiral General Haffaz Aladeen	Republic of Wadiya		The Dictator	Dictator of a fictional country in North Africa called Wadiya, he is known to hold anti-semitic, misogynous, and anti-western attitudes. Aladeen is loosely based on the late leader of Libya, Muammar Gaddafi.	
Adenoid Hynkel	Tomania		The Great Dictator	He is a parody of Adolf Hitler played by Charlie Chaplin. Like the dictator he parodies, he persecutes Jews, which leads to his downfall as he is mistaken for a Jewish lookalike.	
Napaloni	Nation of Bacteria		The Great Dictator	He is a parody of Benito Mussolini played by Jack Oakie.	
Loghain Mac Tir	Ferelden, Thedas	Kingdom of Ferelden	Dragon Age	Betrays the rightful king of Ferelden, Cailan Theirin to his death and appoint himself regent to his daughter and Cailan's widow, Queen Anora. Attempts to intimidate Ferelden's nobility into submitting to his authority sparked the Ferelden Civil War in Origins.	
Arcturus Mengsk	Koprulu Sector, Milky Way	Terran Dominion	StarCraft	Overthrows the Terran Confederacy and crowns himself Emperor of the newly formed Terran Dominion, uniting the Koprulu Sector under one sovereign rule for the first time.	
Rudolf von Goldenbaum	Milky Way	Galactic Federation, Galactic Empire	Legend of the Galactic Heroes	A famous war hero, after his victory over the pirates his celebrity had escalated dramatically and was voted senator into the Galactic Parliament. Soon after was chosen President of the Federation by popular vote and appointed Prime Minister by the Parliament, transforming the Federation into a dictatorship with himself as "president for life". Finally he reorganized the Federation into the Galactic Empire and declared himself emperor. His rise to power bears many similarities to the rise of Adolf Hitler in Germany.	
Lyndon LaRouche	United States	LaRouche movement	Sliders episode, "Time Again and World"	An absolute ruler in this alternate United States series, the Sliders.	
Berzelius "Buzz" Windrip	A plutocratic/totalitarian United States	Unknown	It Can't Happen Here	A charismatic and power-hungry politician who is elected President of the United States on a populist platform, promising to restore the country to prosperity and greatness, and, more importantly, promising each citizen five thousand dollars a year. Once in power, however, he becomes a dictator; outlawing dissent, putting his political enemies in concentration camps, and creating a paramilitary force called the Minute Men who terrorize the citizens. One of his first moves as president is to make changes to the Constitution which give the president sole power over the country, rendering Congress obsolete. This is met by protest from the congressmen as well as outraged citizens, but Windrip declares a state of martial law and, with the help of his Minute Men, throws the protesters in jail. As Windrip dismantles democracy, most Americans either support him and his Corpo Regime wholeheartedly or reassure themselves that fascism cannot happen in America (hence the book's title).	
Marshal Kûrvi-Tasch	Borduria	Bordurian Government	The Adventures of Tintin	Dictator of a fictional semi-totalitarian Fascist state in The Adventures of Tintin series	
Ex-Soviet dictator	Novistrana	Federal Republic of Novistrana	Republic: The Revolution	Dictator of a fictional post-USSR independent nation in the video game, "Republic: The Revolution"	
Heinz Doofenshmirtz	Tri-state area	Doofenschmirtz Evil Incorporated	Phineas and Ferb: Across the 2nd Dimension	A more competent version of the evil scientist from the 2nd Dimension, who has successfully taken over the Tri-state area, holding it in an iron grip through an army of Norm Bots and cyborg animals.	
Heinz Doofenshmirtz	Tri-state area	Doofenschmirtz Evil Incorporated	Phineas and Ferb: Phineas and Ferb's Quantum Boogaloo	A version of Doofenshmirtz overtook the Tri-state area in a future altered by a grown-up Candace. Some of his notable policies include making labcoats a mandatory uniform, and renaming everyone to Joe in order to not have to remember names.	
Sheldon Plankton	Bikini Bottom	Chum Bucket Restaurant	SpongeBob SquarePants	The business rival of SpongeBob's boss Eugene Krabs, who took over Bikini Bottom with the sale of mind-controlling bucket-like helmets in The SpongeBob SquarePants Movie.	
Leon Bronev	The Nest	Targent	Professor Layton and the Miracle Mask and Professor Layton and the Azran Legacy	Hershel Layton and Jean Descole's original father, Targent's leader, and the main antagonist of Professor Layton and the Azran Legacy	
Trellis Dump	England and one half of the planet Earth, later the entire Earth	Eden Corporation	George and the Ship of Time	President and CEO of Eden Corporation and eventual ruler of the planet Earth. Came to power as a result of a nuclear war, which was orchestrated by him in the plot. Is portrayed as misanthropic, anti-scientific and totalitarian. Resembles US president Donald Trump and probably famous dictators of past century like Hitler and Stalin.	
Libby Folfax	Retroville, Texas (alternate timeline)		The Adventures of Jimmy Neutron: Boy Genius episode, "The Tomorrow Boys"	Dictator of the world	
Sheen Estevez	Retroville, Texas		Sheens Brain	Dictator of the world	
Shredder	New York City	Foot Clan	Teenage Mutant Ninja Turtles	A ninjutsu master who served as the Ninja Turtles’ archenemy, having taken over New York City in many incarnations.	
Venomous Snaptrap	Snaptrapolis (alternate version of Petropolis)	D.O.O.M (Diabolical Order Of Mayhem)	T.U.F.F. Puppy episode ”Watch Dog”	Dictator of Petropolis	
Darkwing Duck aka "Darkwarrior Duck	St Canard		Time and Punishment	Dictator of St Canard	
Nehemiah Scudder aka The Prophet Incarnate	United States		Revolt in 2100 and "If This Goes On—"	Part of Robert Heinlein's Future History time line. Scudder was initially elected, then established a religious quasi-mystical dictatorship.	
Ramos Clemente	Unknown country		The Mirror	Resembles Fidel Castro.	
Jake Featherston	Confederate States of America	Freedom Party	Southern Victory Series	An analogue of Adolf Hitler in Harry Turtledove's Southern Victory Series, in which the Confederacy won the American Civil War in 1862, Featherston rises to power after the Central Powers-aligned United States defeats the Entente-allied Confederacy in the Great War. Under him, African Americans are subject to heavy racial discrimination and are later subjected to genocide (a parallel to The Holocaust).	
President Isaac Ngotelute	Republic of Boriade		An Ancient African Kingdom	A satirical depiction of President Isaac Ngotelute, an enlightened, cruel and brutal ruler, antagonist in "Under the Umbrella: An African Tale" by Manu F. Manun'Ebo from the Democratic Republic of the Congo. This first time novel published in English in the UK in November 2011 (ISBN 978-0-9569316-0-3), weaves delightful humour into apparent light-hearted moments of extreme violence. It portrays a mythical country wounded by cruelties of dictatorship in post-colonial Africa.	
Andrew Ryan	City of Rapture		BioShock	Founder of Rapture, Ryan built Rapture as a utopia to remain isolated from the "outside world", as well severing connections with outside of the city. However, his rule reaches a climax when rival, Frank Fontaine, defies Ryan's objectives, becoming a catalyst for the civil war in Rapture.	
Zachary Hale Comstock	City of Columbia		BioShock: Infinite	Also known as "Father Comstock", he is the messianic leader of the flying city of Columbia and the leader of the ultra-nationalist organization of "the Founders", whom are involved in a civil war against the militant organization Vox Populi, as well as stopping the "false shepherd" Booker DeWitt, the protagonist. Comstock is capable of seeing the future with the help of technology developed in his city.	
Dr. Wallace Breen	City 17	Combine	Half-Life 2	Former administration of Black Mesa Research Facility, Dr. Breen is the appointed chancellor of City 17, while Earth is ruled by the Combine and serves as the main antagonist of Half-Life 2. Breen is presumed dead after failing to escape the planet.	
Scolar Visari	Helghan Empire	The Helghast	Killzone	Scolar Visari is the former ultra-nationalist ruler of the planet Helghan from the Killzone series, who united the planet with rhetoric and violence. Rose to power after the first failed war against the Interplanetary Strategic Alliance by weakened Helghan troops, and vows vengeance for the empire. Visari is based heavily on Adolf Hitler and fascist ideals, but has a cult personality similar to that of Joseph Stalin and Kim Il Sung.	
Queen Myrrah	Hollow of Planet Sera		Gears of War	Leader of the Locust Horde, Myrrah holds great contempt for the human race living on the planet Sera for allegedly forcing the locust underground. She holds a racist view towards humanity, seeing them as inferior, and inevitably leads a genocidal war against Serans.	
El Presidente	Island of Tropico		Tropico	Unnamed player character of the Tropico series, El presidente, depending on the actions of the player, can choose to become a totalitarian dictator aligned with any political party, or a democratic ruler of the island nation of Tropico.	
President Richardson	Oil rig of the coast of North California	The Enclave	Fallout 2	The main antagonist of the game, he has largely the same goals as President John Henry Eden, hoping to use the modified FEV he obtained from the Mariposa Military base, a virus used to create a race of Super Mutants. The player of Fallout 2 kills him either directly by going to his office or indirectly by blowing up the oil rig.	
President John Henry Eden	Capital Wasteland and the former United States	The Enclave	Fallout 3	President Eden is the leader of the Enclave forces of the game, made up by the remnants of the American government. However, rather than attempting to rebuild the United States, President Eden attempts to create a pure race of Americans opposed to the surviving wastelanders and persuades the player to sabotage his/her father's project: project purity, a project to eradicate radiation from water.	
Caesar	Mojave Wasteland	Caesar's Legion	Fallout: New Vegas	Totalitarian dictator of The Legion	
The Governor	Woodbury, Georgia		The Walking Dead	The Governor, serves as the self-declared leader of a small survivalist encampment located in Woodbury, Georgia in the post-apocalyptic setting of The Walking Dead, fighting both zombies and the survival group led by the story's protagonist Rick Grimes.	
Premier Alexander Romanov	Soviet Union		Red Alert 2	Leader of Soviet forces in an alternative universe involving a war between the western Allied forces and the Soviets, he is accompanied by his companion Yuri, who later betrays him by killing him. However, Romanov returns to life after the commander of the Red Army travels back in time and stops Yuri.	
Sauron	Mordor, Middle-Earth		The Lord of the Rings	A fallen Maia who served as Morgoth's first lieutenant leader of the orc army of Mordor attempting to achieve domination of Middle-Earth, only to be weakened by Isildur. Sauron attempts to regain his ring stolen by Isildur, which later recovered by Bilbo Baggins and in the possession of his nephew Frodo Baggins, to return to power, only to be completely defeated after the ring is dropped into Mount Doom.	
Morgoth	Utumno Angband, Middle-Earth		The Lord of the Rings	Was the first Dark Lord, and the primordial source of evil in Eä prior to Sauron.	
The White Witch	Narnia		The Lion, the Witch, and the Wardrobe	Ruler of Narnia, the White Witch is known to rule the land with endless winters and preventing Christmas from coming, as well as using minions to keep the land under her control, who serve as a secret police force.	
President Greg Stillson	United States		The Dead Zone	Although only running for president, the main character, Johnny Smith, has a vision that predicts Senator Greg Stillson will lead a nuclear holocaust on Russia, despite opposition from his aides and military generals. To prevent Stillson from becoming president, Johnny attempted to assassinate him but fails, only to successfully tarnish Stillson's political career and, eventually, lead him to suicide.	
Hiram Burrows	City of Dunwall, Gristol		Dishonored	After being involved in a coup between an elite cadre of politicians and nobles in the city of Dunwall, during a time of a massive plague outbreak, Hiram Burrows orchestrates an assassination on the city's empress and frames the protagonist, Corvo Attano, for the murder in order to avoid any resistance. Rather than helping the ailing citizens of Dunwall, he constantly places the city under martial law and imposes extreme measures to avoid dissent.	
General Anton Vincent	Fictional British island		Dear Dictator	Exiled dictator movie, starring Michael Caine.	
Lord Voldemort (formerly known as Tom Riddle)	The Wizarding Community of Great Britain	Death Eater	Harry Potter	An evil wizard who takes over the government of Great Britain's Wizarding Community, using one of his followers as a figurehead. Modeled after Adolf Hitler but also incorporates many aspects of Benito Mussolini and Joseph Stalin.	
Gellert Grindelwald	The Wizarding World	The Alliance	Fantastic Beasts	An evil wizard prior to Lord Voldemort who holds ambitions to take control of the Wizarding Community on a World Wide Scale, and enslave any Muggle or No-Maj's. Mirrors Benito Mussolini.	
George Washington	United States		Assassin's Creed III	In the main story of Assassin's Creed 3, Washington is a central character and an ally of the Assassin Ratonhnhaké:ton (Connor). In an alternate reality depicted in the DLC story The Tyranny of King Washington, Washington becomes mad with power and declares himself King of America, becoming a megalomaniacal dictator.	
Jamal al-Fayeed	Abbudin		Tyrant	He is the successor to his father as president of Abbudin, a Middle Eastern nation.	
Emperor Belos	Boiling Isles	Coven System	The Owl House	The emperor of Boiling Isles who created the Coven System for categorizing magic into specific disciplines instituted by himself. Ultimately turns out to be a colonial-era human witch hunter planning to use the sigils he forced onto the population to wipe out all life on the Boiling Isles.	
Werner	Riverford		Octopath Traveler	The mastermind behind the fall of the Kingdom of Hornburg, after which he bought land and status and took over the city of Riverford. While his iron fist methods of dealing with criminals was initially welcomed, eventually even the smallest offenses or opposition became punished without trial by burning at the stake. Corruption is also encouraged among the guards he installed.	
General Mugen Ku	Hinoeuma	Ku	Octopath Traveler II	A ruthless monarch who believes that might makes right, and that he is worthy of ruling the entire world. He orders the systematic genocide of conquered nations because he believes their grudges would be the seeds of rebellion, and began his coup d'état against his father and brother by slaughtering everyone who supported the latter.	
Ga'ran Sigatar Khura'in	Khura'in		Phoenix Wright: Ace Attorney – Spirit of Justice	She is the queen and former Minister of Justice of the Himalayan kingdom of Khura'in. She attempted to assassinate her sister Amara and usurped the throne for her, leading her to become queen and serve for the next twenty-three years, despite having no spiritual power. Ga'ran passed the Defense Culpability Act, which stated that the sentences for defendants who were found guilty are also placed upon all those who supported the defendant in any way, including their lawyer, leading to many executions.	
Dr. Wily	Mega City		Mega Man	Wily takes control of Earth in a potential future depicted in the episode "Future Shock".	
Desta Rahal	Bahari		Scorpion	He is the leader of the North African country of Bahari. He lives luxuriously despite his nation's extreme poverty, but brings himself attention when a leftover Nazi "Sun Gun" is found. Rahal acts politely to outsiders but does not respond well to what he views as being "slighted".	
Khan Noonien Singh	Earth, most of Eurasia and Africa	Augments	Star Trek	He is a superhuman, who conquered and controlled at lest for 80 countries during "Eugenics Wars" of 1992–1996 until he was overthrown at a cost of 37 million dead and exiled in space with his followers. In episode "Space Seed" of Star Trek: The Original Series his space ship was discovered by USS Enterprise 300 years later. After that he tried to restart "Eugenics Wars" but was defeated by the Enterprise crew and exiled on a prison planet. In Star Trek: The Wrath of Khan he escaped and tried to revenge the Enterprise crew by using terraforming project Genesis but was defeated again for good. In Star Trek Into Darkness (set in parallel Kelvin timeline) Khan's ship was discovered by Starfleet Admiral Alexander Marcus after destruction of the planet Vulcan. Marcus forced Khan to work for him against any enemy of the Federation (particularly against the Klingon Empire) by holding his crew as hostage, in return Khan started plotting against the Federation in order to return his crew and to restart "Eugenics Wars" but they both were defeated by the Enterprise crew. Admiral Marcus was killed and Khan was put in stasis with the rest of his crew.	
Grande	Wizard Kingdom		Tweeny Witches	The main antagonist of the series, Grande is the military dictator of Wizard Kingdom attempting to use the forbidden dark magic, which he believes will create a new world for his people to live in. Grande manipulates Eva into performing dark magic by preying on her insecurities, only for Arusu to undo the forbidden magic with the legendary magic of light.	
Shelby Forthright and AUTO	Earth and the Axiom	BNL Corporation	WALL-E	Shelby Forthright is the president and CEO of Buy N' Large and the supreme leader of Earth until all humans fled Earth due to pollution. AUTO is a robot who oversees the Axiom, a ship carrying the remnants of humanity, until he is shut down by the Axiom's captain.	
Original Four Great Devil Kings	Underworld		Highschool DxD	The Original Four Great Devil Kings, Lucifer, Beelzebub, Leviathan and Asmodeus are the original rulers of Devils whom were extremely domineering tyrants with immense arrogance, not content with just ruling over the Devils, had desired world domination to destroyed the world and to recreate it into a world under their dictatorship. For this purpose, the original Devil Kings led the Devils to fight in Armageddon against the Angels led by the God and the Fallen Angels led by Grigori resulting in the deaths of countless Devils including the Devil Nobles Families of the Ars Goetia, leading the Devils into becoming an endangered species. Even after their death, their ideologies and ambition were inherited by their descendants who also desired world domination.	
Kurozumi Orochi	Wano Country		One Piece	The evil Shogun of Wano Country, Orochi had collaborated with Kaido to usurp the Kozuki Shogunate, a corrupt tyrant with an insatiable greed for wealth and power. Orochi brought immense suffering to his own citizens, forcing them to live in wastelands, enslaving them to lifelong slavery under the Beast Pirates to mass-produced weapons for Kaido and forcing them to eat only leftovers, resulting in countless dying of malnutrition.	
Imu and the Five Elders	World Government		One Piece	Imu is the supreme ruler of the World Government, who occupies the Empty Throne and whom even the Five Elders bow to and serve unquestioningly. The Five Elders are a council of the five highest-ranking Celestial Dragons, the highest authorities of the World Government.	
Charlotte Linlin	Totto Land		One Piece	The tyrannical Pirate Queen of Totto Land. An immensely brutal and selfish psychopath who forced people to attend her tea parties via death threats to their love ones, sending them their severed heads as presents for refusal to attend her tea parties. Even forcing innocent people to attend her tea parties just to be killed such as Sanji. Even her own children are not safe from her brutality.	
Vivienne Rook	United Kingdom	Four Star movement	Years and Years	Businessperson turned politician who rises through politics over many years before becoming prime minister and using multiple crises that face her country to dismantle democracy.	
Lofwyr	Primarily Germany	Saeder-Krupp Heavy Industries	Shadowrun	Dragon and CEO of the privately held Saeder-Krupp Heavy Industries. He maintains near-absolute control over his corporation, going so far as to keep tabs on each individual, and a joke in the setting is that he eats incompetent employees as snacks.	
Giliath Osborne	Erebonian Empire	Reformist faction	Trails	Military hero who became Chancellor prior to the start of the series as a result of the Hundred Days War, with the intent of reforming the Empire's feudal power structure by any means necessary, knowing his despotic actions will be judged harshly in the future. It emerges in Trails of Cold Steel IV that his actions as Chancellor were also designed to lead to the destruction of the Curse of Erebonia, though he is forced to engineer the Curse's release as part of this plan. Since taking power, he has been exploiting or manufacturing crises in neighboring countries with the intent of annexing them into the Empire, which happens to Crossbell in Trails to Azure; however, since one of his enemies is Erebonia's nobility, he is only able to consolidate power after the events of Trails of Cold Steel II. Appointed as interim emperor in Trails of Cold Steel III after an attempt on the emperor's life, and uses his new position to declare martial law.	
Duke Cayenne	Erebonian Empire	Noble Alliance	Trails	Leader of the Noble Alliance, which opposes Giliath Osborne not because of his authoritarianism or hostile foreign policy but because his reforms threaten the Empire's unjust social system. In the course of the Erebonian Civil War, started when Osborne is assassinated, he oversees the Noble Alliance taking Erebonia's royal family hostage and martial law that makes life for normal Erebonians intolerable.	
Dieter Crois	Crossbell	Independent State of Crossbell	Trails	The mayor of Crossbell during the events of Trails to Azure. After a referendum — held in the wake of a false flag jaeger attack intended to inflame anti-Erebonian sentiment — supports the idea of becoming an independent state, Crois illegally sidelines the Crossbell Diet to declare independence, unilaterally refashions himself as president, and uses Ouroboros resources to transform Crossbell into a police state and wage war against Erebonia and Calvard. His actions as president, in particular the destruction of Garrelia Fortress, provoke Erebonia into invading Crossbell after the Erebonian Civil War is over, resulting in it being annexed into the Empire.	
Havelock Vetinari	Ankh-Morpork		Discworld	The Patrician of the City of Ankh-Morpork, he is presented as a benevolent dictator and shown to govern the city through a "highly specialised form of democracy", "one man, one vote" (in that he is the man and he has the vote). He involves the city's assorted guilds, noble families and other interests in the governance through an advisory city council, will not undertake controversial actions unless he has the popular backing to do so, and puts the good of the city above all else. The position of Patrician has existed for centuries, with his predecessors having frequently been psychopathic criminals	
Monika	Digital World (Doki Doki Literature Club!)	Literature Club	Doki Doki Literature Club!	President of the Literature Club.	
Sayori	Digital World (Doki Doki Literature Club!)	Literature Club	Doki Doki Literature Club!	President of the Literature Club.	
General Bruteztrausen	Republic of Tirania		Mort & Phil story "El sulfato atómico"	A dictator who has stolen a sample of a sulfate invented by Prof. Bacterio that makes insects grow multiple times their size, and plans to use it to take over the world.	
Antofagasto Panocho	Republic of Chula		Mort & Phil story "El Tirano"	A ruthless tyrant estimated to have killed 14 opposing politicians in a week, known for ordering executions of civilians for any minor slight. Initially a parody of Chilean dictator Augusto Pinochet, although he would also appear in "¡Venganza cincuentona!", published over a year after Pinochet's death.	
Evil Queen	Unnamed Kingdom	Unknown	Snow White	The Evil Queen is compared to the original version. This queen apparently has the autarch's feature. After she kills Snow White's father, The Good King, she orders farmers to be her soldiers and citizens to be workers.	
Scar	Pride Lands	Hyena clan, Scar's Loyalists	The Lion King	The younger brother of King Mufasa. He murders Mufasa, convinces his nephew Simba that Simba caused the death and drives him into exile, then takes the throne of the Pride Lands with the hyenas as his enforcers. He rules as an egoistic dictator; his misrule brings famine and ruin to the kingdom until the adult Simba comes back and overthrows him. His villain song "Be Prepared" shows the hyenas goose-stepping past him, imagery modeled on the Nazi propaganda film Triumph of the Will.	
Von Braun	Wisconsin	Party of Will/Wisconsin Landwehr	Victoria: A Novel of 4th Generation War	Leader of the Wisconsin Landwehr, a neo-Nazi militia that takes over Wisconsin and invades Minnesota after the collapse of the United States.	
Regina Mills	Storybrooke, Maine		Once Upon a Time	Mayor of Storybrooke	
The Authority	The Multiverse		His Dark Materials	God	
Metatron	The Multiverse		His Dark Materials	Regent of Heaven	
Starlight Glimmer	Our Town		My Little Pony: Friendship Is Magic	Dictator of a small village in Equestria with the goal of achieving equality among ponies by removing their cutie marks and special talents.	
Princess Celestia	Equestria		Starship Ponyville	Dictator of Equestria in Featherdance's World after assuming emergency powers as part of Project Banshee.	
Dante	Hypixel Skyblock		Hypixel Skyblock	Elected in a landslide vote by players, Dante promised "Order, Security, and Freedom." He cancelled various in-game events for being "too dangerous," including daytime to prevent sunburn. He was eventually defeated by the player base in a special revolution event.	
Diego Gaspar Navarro	Leasath	Leasath Armed Forces	Ace Combat X: Skies of Deception	Navarro took control over Leasath following the Leasath Civil War. He misappropriated humanitarian aid from Aurelia for arms purchases and initiated the invasion of Aurelia.	
Fearless Leader	Pottsylvania	Central Control	The Adventures of Rocky and Bullwinkle and Friends	Dictator of a small country in Eastern Europe with both Soviet and Nazi traits.	
Arthur Slugworth	Unnamed town	Chocolate Cartel	Wonka	Arthur Slugworth is the one of the most famous chocolatiers in the galleries gourmet with his rivals Felix Fickelgruber and Gerald Prodnose, where they blackmailed anyone with chocolate to get out of trouble.	
