= Sad Panda =

Sad Panda or Sadpanda may refer to:

- "Sexual Harassment Panda", an episode of the television series South Park that spawned the "sad panda" internet meme
- Exhentai, a hentai file sharing website colloquially known as Sad Panda
- Jialing Chen, a New York City man who created the "Sad Panda" costumed character
- Sad Panda Studios, a game developer
