= Saori =

- Pronunciation: sah-YOR-ee
- Gender: Female

Origin
- Origin: Japanese
- Meaning: Different meanings depending on the kanji used

Saori (written: 沙織, 早織, 佐織, 砂織, 沙保里, 沙緒里, 紗央里, 紗央莉, 左多里 or さおり in hiragana) is a feminine Japanese given name. Notable people with the name include:

- Saori (born 1981), Japanese-Korean model and singer
- Saori Anou (安納サオリ; born 1991), Japanese wrestler
- Saori Arimachi (有町 紗央里; born 1988), Japanese women's footballer
- Saori Ariyoshi (有吉 佐織; born 1987), Japanese women's footballer
- Saori Atsumi (渥美 佐織; born 1989), Japanese singer-songwriter
- Saori Gotō (後藤 沙緒里; born 1987), Japanese voice actress and singer
- Saori Hara (原 紗央莉; born 1988), Japanese AV actress
- Saori Haruguchi (春口 沙緒里; born 1987), Japanese swimmer
- Saori Hayami (早見 沙織; born 1991), Japanese voice actress and singer
- Saori Horii (堀井 沙織; born 1984), Japanese gravure idol
- Saori Ikeuchi (池内 さおり; born 1982), Japanese politician
- Saori Imai (今井 沙緒里; born 1990), Japanese retired track and field sprinter
- Saori Inagaki (稲垣 早織; born 1990), Japanese rhythmic gymnast
- Saori Ishibashi, Japanese karateka
- Saori Ishioka (石岡 沙織; born 1987), Japanese mixed martial artist, kickboxer and karateka
- Saori Kimura (木村 沙織; born 1986), Japanese volleyball player
- Saori Kitakaze (北風 沙織; born 1985), Japanese sprinter
- Saori Kobayashi (小林 早織), Japanese video game composer and pianist
- Saori Kondo (近藤 小織; born 1956), Japanese badminton player
- Madokoro Akutagawa Saori (芥川 (間所) 紗織; 1924–1966), Japanese painter
- Saori Minami (南 沙織; born 1954), Japanese idol and singer
- Saori Miyazaki (宮崎 早織; born 1995), Japanese baseball player
- Saori Nagamine (永峰 沙織; born 1993), Japanese archer
- Saori Obata (小畑 沙織; born 1978), Japanese tennis player
- Saori Oguri (小栗 左多里; born 1966), Japanese manga artist
- Saori Sarina Ohno (born 1970), German classical pianist
- Saori Ōnishi (大西 沙織; born 1992), Japanese voice actress
- Saori Ono (小野 砂織; born 1975), Japanese model and actress
- Saori Onoda (小野田 紗栞; born 2001), Japanese member of the Camellia Factory
- Saori Oshima (大島 沙緒里; born 1994), Japanese mixed martial artist
- Saori Ozaki (尾崎 沙織; born 1996), Japanese badminton player
- Saori Sakoda (迫田 さおり; born 1987), Japanese volleyball player
- Saori Seto (世戸 さおり; born 1982), Japanese voice actress
- Saori Shimai (島井 咲緒里; born 1980), Japanese women's professional shogi player
- Saori Sugimoto ((沙織 杉本; born 1964), Japanese voice actress
- Saori Suzuki (鈴木 沙織; born 1990), Japanese freestyle skier
- Saori Takahashi (高橋 沙織; born 1992), Japanese volleyball player
- Saori Takarada (宝田 沙織; born 1999), Japanese footballer
- Saori Yamamoto (山本 早織; born 1985), Japanese gravure idol
- Saori Yasaka (八坂 沙織; born 1989), Japanese former member of the Super Girls (Japanese group)
- Saori Yoshida (吉田 沙保里; born 1982), Japanese sport wrestler
- Saori Yoshikawa (吉川 沙織; born 1976), Japanese politician
- Saori Yuki (由紀 さおり; born 1948), Japanese singer and actress

== Fictional characters ==
- Saori Hyuuga (日向沙織), a character in the 2006 anime series Futari wa Pretty Cure Splash Star
- Saori Takebe (武部 沙織), a character in the anime series Girls und Panzer
- Saori Jōmae (錠前 サオリ), a character in the role-playing video game Blue Archive
- Saori Kido (城戸 紗織, Kido Saori) a main character in the manga and anime series Saint Seiya.
- Saori Hidaka (日高さおり), a character in the 2020 rhythm game & anime series D4DJ

== See also ==
- Saori@destiny, Japanese musician
- Sayori
- Saori (video game)
