= Crush Crush =

2016 video game

- Developer: Sad Panda Studios
- Publisher: Sad Panda Studios
- Engine: Unity
- Platforms: Android, browser, iOS, Microsoft Windows, OS X, Linux, Nintendo Switch
- Release: February 9, 2016: Browser; WW: February 9, 2016 Microsoft Windows, OS X, Linux; WW: October 19, 2016 Android; WW: October 29, 2019 iOS; WW: January 2021 Nintendo Switch; WW: January 27, 2022
- Genres: Incremental game, dating sim
- Mode: Single-player

Crush Crush is a free-to-play incremental dating sim created by Canadian game developer Sad Panda Studios. The game features a number of characters that the protagonist can date and win over. Crush Crush is live serviced, and continues to receive updates and new content from its developer. Over the years many large new features have been added, such as phone flings, limited time events, parallel events system, animated segments, voice acting and cross platform voting.

Receiving a positive critical reception, the game was expanded into a media franchise, including the games Blush Blush, Cabin Fever, Hush Hush, and Soul Mates, crossovers with Yandere Simulator, Orgynizer, and the Merryweather Media webtoon series Internet Explorer, and a webtoon adaptation of Crush Crush produced by Merryweather for WEBTOON in 2021.

== Gameplay ==
The goal of Crush Crush is for the protagonist "Marshmallow" to interact with and ultimately seduce all of the characters in the game. The base game has 20 romanceable characters, and over 50 additional characters can either be purchased as paid DLC, or unlocked for free during limited time events. To progress, the player must work at different jobs to earn money, practice various hobbies to improve their attributes, and use their money and skills to level up each character's affection for the player. Each of these activities require "time blocks" to perform. Achievements award the player with additional time blocks, allowing them to perform more activities simultaneously. These activities progress in real time even when the game is closed. Like other incremental games, Crush Crush has a prestige mechanic. The player can reset their game progress at any time to unlock a permanent speed boost for future playthroughs. The requirements to progress through the game scale exponentially, encouraging the player to take advantage of the prestige mechanic multiple times.

Alongside its main progression system, Crush Crush also has "phone flings" where the player receives in-game text messages and pictures from different characters. Some characters must be fully romanced in the main game to unlock their phone fling, while others start as a phone fling, and can then be unlocked in the main game later.

== Release ==
Crush Crush was originally released on February 9, 2016 as a browser game on Kongregate. A downloadable version was released on Steam in early access on May 13, 2016, followed by the full release on October 19, 2016.

In late 2016 an adult version called Crush Crush: Moist and Uncensored was released on Nutaku as a browser game, with the adult version coming to Humble Bundle shortly thereafter. In 2019 Crush Crush was released on Google Play, in 2021 Crush Crush was released on the App Store, and in 2022, the game was released on the Nintendo Switch.

=== Webtoon ===
In December 2021, Sad Panda Studio partnered with Merryweather Media to produce a webtoon adaptation of Crush Crush.

== Spin-offs ==
Release timeline
2016	Crush Crush
2017
2018
2019
2020	Blush Blush
2021	Cabin Fever
2022
2023	Hush Hush

Sad Panda Studios have developed and published several Crush Crush spin-off games. Crush Crush has also appeared in crossovers with games from other developers.

=== Blush Blush ===
Blush Blush is an incremental dating sim with the same gameplay model as Crush Crush but featuring male love interests instead of female. It was released in early access on April 4, 2019, with the full release on April 22, 2020.

=== Cabin Fever ===
Cabin Fever is a romance visual novel developed by Steamy Buns Games and published by Sad Panda Studios. It was released on July 12, 2021. In it the protagonist is a computer programmer living in an isolated cabin, who forms a relationship with the main heroine Mallory when she gets lost in a storm. Mallory also appears in Crush Crush as a DLC character.

=== Hush Hush ===
Hush Hush – Only Your Love Can Save Them, or simply Hush Hush, is a dating sim featuring characters from both Crush Crush and Blush Blush. Lotus, an original character from Hush Hush also appears in Crush Crush as a DLC character. The game was released in early access on August 22, 2022, with the full release on April 20, 2023. In Hush Hush the player must manage their everyday life working at different jobs, choosing how to spend their time, and pursuing the game's five possible love interests.

=== Crossovers ===
The protagonist of Yandere Simulator Ayano Aishi and supporting character Kokona Haruka (as Generica) were added to Crush Crush as dateable love interests in 2016, with Michaela Laws and Caitlin Myers reprising their respective roles, while the cast of Crush Crush were added to Yandere Simulator as character skins. Following the end of the Yandere Simulator licensing in 2023, Ayano was redesigned as "Ayeka", now a parodic composite character with Monika from Doki Doki Literature Club!.

In 2021, the protagonist of the Merryweather Media webtoon series Internet Explorer was added to Crush Crush as the dateable love interest "Explora", voiced by Mew Miya, after the company partnered with Sad Panda Studios to create an official Crush Crush webcomic.

Characters from Crush Crush make cameo appearances in the 2022 game Orgynizer, developed by LizardFactory.

== Reception ==
The Crush Crush franchise has a received a universally positive critical reception.

Comic Book Resources called Crush Crush "the best example of how an idle and dating sim game can be both low-key and fun at the same time" which makes one "feel like relaxing after a long day". PC Gamer said "There's a sea of hentai junk games on Steam, and then there's Crush Crush", a game full of "crazy stuff [which is] fun and rewarding". In a 2021 article about Crush Crush, Gamesindustry.biz wrote that Sad Panda Studios is "Crush Crushing stereotypes" by providing "adult games about everyday people".

RPGFan rated Hush Hush 86/100, saying the game "reminds me of the song "Coconuts" by Kim Petras. At first blush, both entities appear to be vapid, cringeworthy fanservice. But further glances reveal smart, self-aware subversion that’s more than meets the eye".
