= Dead of the Brain =

1992 video game

Dead of the Brain: Day of the Living Dead
- MSX2 cover
- Developer: FairyTale
- Publisher: IDES
- Platforms: PC-98; FM Towns; MSX2; X68000; PC Engine Super CD-ROM²; Windows
- Release: April 1992
- Genres: Point and click, visual novel

Dead of the Brain: Day of the Living Dead (Note: Japanese: Dead of Brain死霊の叫び, Hepburn: Dead of Brain: Shiryō no Sakebi; lit. 'Dead of Brain: Cry of the Dead') is a Japanese horror point and click adventure game developed by FairyTale and released in April 1992. The game follows Cole, who becomes caught in a zombie outbreak resulting from a botched experiment conducted by his scientist friend, Doctor Cooger, who developed a serum to resurrect the dead.

Following an incident involving their erotic game Saori (1991), FairyTale switched to developing horror games, beginning with Dead of the Brain. Two other games were released as part of the Nightmare Collection: the game's sequel Dead of the Brain 2 (1993) and Marine Philt (1993). Following these releases, the company returned to developing eroge.

A port of Dead of the Brain was bundled with its sequel for the PC Engine CD. While originally planned for release in January 1996, the bundle was only released in 1999, making it the final official PC Engine game.

== Synopsis and gameplay ==
Dead of the Brain has the player take on the role of Cole, a man who finds himself in the middle of a zombie outbreak after an experiment by his best friend, Doctor Cooger, to bring the dead back to life goes awry.

Dead of the Brain is an adventure game with heavy emphasis on point and click and visual novel mechanics. It also features some eroge elements/sexual themes, calling back to developer FairyTale's previous productions. Players control Cole by using a set of command verbs and clicking sections of the screen. The goal for Cole is to survive and find a way to save his friends from the zombie horde. Occasional action sequences require the player to figure out a correct action within a short time limit.

== Development and release ==
After the release of Saori (1991), an eroge game, a scandal arose after a teenager stole a copy of the game, leading to the arrest of FairyTale's president for distributing erotic material. This led the company to pivot to a different kind of material with their Nightmare Collection series, beginning with Dead of the Brain.

While Kurt Kalata described the game as being influenced by Western zombie films, such as those by George A. Romero, Takeshi Uechi said they lacked the philosophy of Romero's work and were closer in tone to splatter films such as The Evil Dead (1981) and Re-Animator (1985). DenFamico Gamer described Dead of the Brain, along with Alone in the Dark (1992), as part of the horror genre's return to personal computer games in the early 1990s, with games that paid homage to horror films.

Dead of the Brain was first released in Japan in April 1992. The MSX2 port was said to be 95% complete by July 1992. Releases for the X68000 and MSX2 series of computers were scheduled for release in July 1992. An official English Windows release, announced in July 2026, came out on Steam on 30 October 2026.

== Reception ==
A review in Technopolis complimented the game's production quality and graphics, as well as its story, which it found interesting and full of twists.

The magazine OLD!Gamer said the version released for the X68000 had better graphics than the original release.

In a retrospective review, Kalata described the game as "remarkably schlocky," citing its gore, cheesy dialogue, and gratuitous nudity. He found the game "remarkably effective at being creepy" with its manga-styled artwork by Ryuichi Makino. Takeshi Uechi, writing for DenFamico Gamer in 2016, described Dead of the Brain and its sequel as important cult titles in the history of Japanese horror games, their B-film plots and comic-book-style graphics giving them a unique appeal. The reviewer said the game's high price on the second-hand market, combined with the lack of a re-release, made it difficult to re-evaluate.

== Aftermath ==
Other entries in the company's Nightmare Collection include the game's sequel Dead of the Brain 2 (1993) and Marine Philt (1993). Dead of the Brain 2 follows the narrative of the first game. After the release of these games, FairyTale resumed releasing eroge. Dead of the Brain and its sequel were bundled together as a video game compilation by NEC and released for the PC Engine on June 3, 1999 (originally set to be released in January 1996). It became the final official release for the PC Engine in Japan. The release for the PC Engine CD features voice acting.

The game has received several fan translation patches: one in 2019 and one in 2023 for the PC-98 version, and another for the PC Engine port in 2023. An English fan translation for Dead of the Brain 2 was released in 2025. An official English version of the first game came out in 2026, with such a release for the sequel also planned.
