= Natsuki (Doki Doki Literature Club!) =

Video game character

- Doki Doki Literature Club! character
- Natsuki in Doki Doki Literature Club!
- First appearance: Doki Doki Literature Club! (2017)
- Created by: Dan Salvato
- Designed by: Salvato; Satchely

In-universe information
- Nationality: Japanese

Natsuki is a character in the video game series Doki Doki Literature Club! (DDLC). She is one of four girls in the literature club, alongside Sayori, Yuri, and Monika. She is a tsundere given a backstory of domestic abuse by her father, with her traits ultimately becoming more pronounced due to Monika's intervention in the game's files. She was created by Dan Salvato, who recognized the "reality" behind her and the others. Her character was inspired by people with depression in Salvato's life.

Natsuki was generally well received by critics, with multiple noting scenes involving her as particularly unsettling. She is the last member of the club to be deleted by Monika at the end of the game's second act.

== Concept and creation ==
Natsuki was created for Doki Doki Literature Club! by Dan Salvato. She exhibits the traits of a tsundere, a personality type that is outwardly aggressive, but inwardly soft to the target of their affection. Natsuki lives in an abusive household, escapes her father's abuse by attending the literature club, baking cupcakes and cookies, and reading manga. Her behavior grows more aggressive as the game goes on due to Monika's modification of the video game and her files.

Salvato created stock characters based on anime archetypes that were given Japanese names to emphasize a pseudo-Japanese atmosphere. When designing the cast of Doki Doki Literature Club!, Salvato began to recognize the "reality" behind Natsuki and the others in the game. He sought to connect with the characters, and thus explored their "insecurities and realistic personality traits". He noted that Natsuki was influenced by the depression those in his life suffer from. Due to Salvato's lack of artistic skills at the time, he created the designs of Natsuki and other characters in a free anime-creation program, which were used in a test version of the game. Salvato recognized that a product of such quality would not satisfy potential players, so her final design in-game was handled by freelance artist Satchely.

== Appearances ==
Natsuki appears in the video game Doki Doki Literature Club! (2017), being one of the four members of the game's literature club, along with Sayori, Yuri, and Monika. Natsuki, along with the others, writes poetry, and the player creates their own poetry, being able to choose words that may appeal more to either Natsuki, Sayori, and Yuri, which influences who the player character spends time with. The player may help either Natsuki or Yuri during the cultural festival, with either character attempting to kiss the player character before being interrupted by Sayori. Natsuki sometimes feuds with Yuri for the protagonist's favor, their arguments becoming more heated and personal after Monika's tampering; Natsuki herself becomes crueler in the second act, although she is still concerned by Yuri's erratic behavior. She enjoys manga and kawaii things, and notably bakes cupcakes for the club.

As the game goes along, the player discovers that Natsuki is both malnourished and suffering abuse from her father. Due to distortions caused by Monika, several glitches may occur with her, including one where her neck breaks and she rushes the screen; Natsuki writes a note to the protagonist disguised as a poem that expresses her concern for Yuri's well-being and requests that they do not tell Monika, showing that she recognizes the behavior of the other girls as unusual, before being hacked by Monika to deny what she just requested and tell the player character to only think about Monika. Later, Yuri confesses her love for the player, ultimately committing suicide regardless of the player's response. When Natsuki discovers the corpse, she throws up, running out of the room before being deleted by Monika. After the player defeats Monika, she expresses regret, restoring the world, minus herself.

There are two different endings that may occur. If the player beats the game normally, Sayori becomes self-aware of being a game character, becoming megalomaniacal like Monika, ultimately causing Monika to delete the whole game, Natsuki included. If the player makes a point of witnessing all scenes in act one, the same scene plays out, except Sayori is able to control herself while self-aware, allowing her, Natsuki, and Yuri to continue existing.

Natsuki returns in Yandere Simulator, with her hairstyle added for the game's playable character in 2018, an obsessively lovesick schoolgirl nicknamed "Yandere-chan" who seeks to "eliminate" (kill) anyone she believes is attracting her "senpai's" attention.

Natsuki also appears in the enhanced version of the first game, Doki Doki Literature Club Plus! (2021), which explores how the four girls came to form the literature club.

Natsuki has received multiple pieces of merchandise, including a Nendoroid figure, a wrist watch themed after her, and two YouTooz figures.

== Critical reception ==
Cosplay of Natsuki at the 2025 Heroes ComicCon in Denmark

Natsuki has received generally positive reception. Writer Christopher Patterson noted how Natsuki and Yuri contrast each other, calling Yuri "the blue oni to Natsuki's red oni". He also discussed her appearance, commenting that her pink clothing and red hair were a reflection of her "aloof and fiery temperament". Destructoid writer Charlotte Cutts identified seeing Natsuki throw up upon seeing Yuri's corpse as one of the most shocking things she has ever seen in a video game. GameSpot writer Lucy James found Doki Doki Literature Club! upsetting for a variety of things that happen to its cast. However, she cited a moment with Natsuki as the one that stood out the most, where Natsuki presents a nonsensical poem, begins to go out of control, breaks her own neck, and runs at the screen.

When discussing Sayori's depictions of mental illness, which Fanbyte writer Kara Dennison felt was handled intelligently, she felt that the domestic abuse Natsuki suffers from her father was "not nearly as visible as we pretend they are". She discussed how she uses the club as a safe space, both for herself and her manga, wanting to keep the club "small, familiar, and safe". She also noted that her aggressive behavior to the protagonist, rather than being a product of Salvato's writing, was an in-universe rewriting caused by Monika's narcissism.

Natsuki became the subject of a meme, where people would analyze her appearance and mannerisms in order to determine whether she was assigned male at birth, referred to as a "trap" (calling her "Trapsuki"). People argued this because she has broad shoulders and a flat chest, though others found that her proportions mirrored a cisgender woman's. The Daily Dot writer Ana Valens considered this transphobic, arguing that the term implies that transgender women and crossdressing men "trap" men into sex, particularly due to its recent usage to refer to trans women. She stated that both cisgender and transgender women have significant body variance, making such analysis unreliable to distinguish them. After a user on Twitter asked Salvato to tweet that "Natsuki is a trap", Salvato refused to do so, calling the meme disrespectful and asking that people stop. When asked if people could interpret her as a trans woman, Salvato encouraged people to make their own personal interpretations of her.
