= Yuri (Doki Doki Literature Club!) =

Video game character

- Doki Doki Literature Club! character
- Yuri in Doki Doki Literature Club!
- First appearance: Doki Doki Literature Club! (2017)
- Created by: Dan Salvato

In-universe information
- Nationality: Japanese

Yuri is a character in the 2017 visual novel video game Doki Doki Literature Club! (DDLC). She is a shy girl and someone romantically interested in the protagonist of the game. Described by academic Christopher Patterson as a dandere, and the blue oni to Natsuki's red oni, she is a member of the game's titular literature club. Her self-harm tendencies become more pronounced due to the game's antagonist Monika influencing the in-game files, which culminates in her committing suicide after confessing her love for the protagonist. Her suicide is inevitable in the game. Dan Salvato, the creator of Doki Doki Literature Club!, designed the game as a parody of Japanese dating sims and their tropes. Critics discussed the game's depiction of her mental health, and how Monika influenced her suicide.

== Concept and creation ==
Yuri is one of the characters in Team Salvato's video game Doki Doki Literature Club! (DDLC), a visual novel that is initially presented as a dating simulator, but is revealed to be a metafictional, psychological horror game. She is a member of the game's titular literature club. She is the club's oldest and smartest member. The academic Christopher Patterson identifies Yuri as a dandere (a term in anime meaning a character who is quiet and asocial), and the blue oni to Natsuki's red oni, who is shy, cute, and literate, but secretly deeply in love with the player. Alongside Natsuki and Monika, Patterson names her as one of the games "three main maidens". Yuri is initially presented as a potential love interest, but her mental illness makes her obsessed with the protagonist and suicidal. She self harms by cutting herself, hiding the scars with her sleeves, and masturbates to a pen given to her by the game's protagonist.

DDLC was conceptualised by Team Salvato's lead developer Dan Salvato, who had a mixed relationship with anime – he saw the trope of "cute girls doing cute things" as both an asset and a detriment to the viewer's enjoyment. Salvato designed the game as a parody of tropes in romance games, though with disturbing undertones, stating that he was inspired by "things that are scary because they make you uncomfortable, not because they shove scary-looking things in your face". Salvato wanted the characters to have human traits and based them on his own experiences, and while writing the game, he found that he was recognising the "reality" of characters like Yuri. He wanted to connect more with the characters, and thus explored things like their "insecurities and realistic personality traits" on top of their "stock archetypes". Due to Salvato's lack of artistic skills at the time, he created the designs of Yuri and other characters in a free anime-creation program, which were used in a test version of the game; Salvato recognised that a product of such quality would not satisfy potential players. A friend of Salvato, who was also a translator for the Sekai Project, designed the uniforms and hairstyles of Yuri and the other girls. Yuri's final in-game character design was initially handled by the artist Kagefumi, but following her departure from the game's development, the freelance artist Satchely took over.

== Character history ==
Yuri's corpse after her suicide. The player was left with her corpse for an in-game weekend

The beginning text of Yuri's final poem

Yuri is one of the four non-playable characters in DDLC, alongside Sayori, Natsuki, and Monika, all of whom belong to their school's literature club. Yuri also appears in the enhanced version of the game, Doki Doki Literature Club Plus!, which features multiple "side stories" depicting the club's origin and the relationships between its members.

In DDLC, Sayori convinces the protagonist to join the club, where Yuri, along with the other members of the club, writes poetry. By writing poems, the player can try to romance either Yuri, Natsuki, or Sayori. Poems written by Yuri contain purple prose and have complicated metaphors. Conversations with Yuri reveal that she likes how surreal horror can affect people. Monika and her poems tell the player that she is fascinated with knifes and has self harm tendencies. After Sayori commits suicide, all of the player's save files are deleted and the game restarts without Sayori. Yuri becomes more unstable and more prone to self-harm. If the player chooses to talk to Yuri, they see more of her self harm. Her dialogue also becomes more aggressive and violent. In universe, Yuri's declining mental state are because of Monika changing parts of her code. She commits suicide with a kitchen knife out of love for the protagonist and out of paranoia that she was not in control of her mind.

Yuri's suicide is inevitable, and no action from the player can prevent it. It occurs on a Friday, and the player is left with Yuri's corpse for an in-game weekend, indicated by the brightness levels and the discoloration of her blood and body. Yuri's textbox initially starts displaying gibberish, before repeating "will you promise to spend the most time with me". Checking the game's transcript shows the text as the game's description from its website. Monika then deletes Yuri's character-file (yuri.chr) from the game's file folder and restarts the game again without her. The file contains a Base64-encoded creepypasta written by Salvato called I Found A Box Containing The Story Of A 19-Year-Old Girl Who Killed A Random Person For No Reason.

== Critical reception ==
Cosplay of Yuri at the 2025 Heroes ComicCon in Denmark

Patterson compared Yuri to the protagonist of Christine Love's 2012 visual novel Analogue: A Hate Story, *Hyun-ae, who he also views as a dandere, and Rei Ayanami from the anime Neon Genesis Evangelion. Destructoid writer Charlotte Cutts considered Yuri's suicide to be one of the most shocking things she has ever seen in a video game, IGN Japan writer Shohei Fujita discussed how Yuri's character is affected by Monika's influence, though commenting that with the nature of the game, it could be said that this is true even without Monika's influence. He particularly noted how out of character her cruel commentary towards Natsuki and her eventual suicide are. VG247 writer Ana Valens described her as "the classic shrinking violet", discussing how her traits begin to be corrupted by Monika over time, eventually turning her self-consciousness into self-harm.

Fanbyte writer Kara Dennison felt that Sayori's mental illness was depicted with intelligence, which contrasted Yuri, whose depiction was a "stereotypical, horrific parody of herself". Sayori is shown to have been depressed before Monika modified her data, so she assumed that this was also the case for Yuri's self-harm tendencies, citing a poem in the first act by Yuri that discusses the adrenaline of self-harm. She felt that the depiction of Yuri was disrespectful, but that the point was that it was Monika disrespecting them rather than Salvato. Writer Fanny Barnabé discussed how Yuri's death is unavoidable regardless of the player's decision, as well as how Yuri dominates the second act of the game due to her obsession with the player character.
