= Sayori (disambiguation) =

Sayori is a video game character from Doki Doki Literature Club!

Sayori may also refer to:

- Sayori Ishizuka, Japanese voice actress
- Sayori Wakaba, character in the manga Vampire Knight
- Sayori Mizushima, character in the manga Love Lab
- Sayori Uno, character in the manga Magical Girl Ore

Sayori may also refer to:

- Hyporhamphus sajori, a species of fish
