= Sayori =

Video game character

- Doki Doki Literature Club! character
- Sayori in Doki Doki Literature Club!
- First appearance: Doki Doki Literature Club! (2017)
- Created by: Dan Salvato
- Designed by: Salvato; Satchely

In-universe information
- Nationality: Japanese

Sayori is a character in the 2017 visual novel video game Doki Doki Literature Club! (DDLC). She is the childhood friend and neighbor of the protagonist, pushing him into joining their school's literature club. Over the course of the game, Sayori's cheerful personality is shown to be forced, with symptoms of depression becoming more evident. This culminates in Sayori committing suicide by hanging and being deleted from the game by the literature club's president, Monika. She is ultimately restored by the end of the game, though her fate depends on the player's actions.

Dan Salvato, the creator of Doki Doki Literature Club!, designed the game to be a parody of tropes in romance games. Of the cast, Sayori was the character who had the most real-world influence, with Salvato noting that her depression was inspired by those in his life. While writing the cast, Salvato found himself recognizing their "reality" and wanted to further explore it.

Critical reception of Sayori was positive, with praise directed toward the game's accurate depiction of her depression. Writers and academics have analysed Sayori's characterization, mainly how the game portrays her mental health. They have also studied the scene of the protagonist discovering Sayori's suicide, particularly how the background music played during the scene functions as a transition for Doki Doki Literature Club! to introduce its darker themes. Her suicide was also noted by them to be an inevitable event in the game, regardless of whether the player tries to prevent her death.

== Concept and creation ==
Sayori is one of the characters in Team Salvato's video game Doki Doki Literature Club!, a visual novel that is initially presented as a dating simulator, but is revealed to be a metafictional, psychological horror. She is the neighbor and childhood friend of the player character protagonist, a young male student. The academic Christopher Patterson identifies Sayori as a genki (a term in anime to describe a playful and hyperactive girl) who wants the protagonist to try new things. Sayori is noted for her positive personality, liking for sweet food, clumsiness, and tendency to be late. As the player progresses through the game, they discover that Sayori has depression, exhibiting symptoms like forced positivity, overeating, oversleeping, forgetfulness, difficulty getting out of bed, and suicidal thoughts.

Doki Doki Literature Club! was conceptualised by Team Salvato's lead developer Dan Salvato, who had a mixed relationship with anime – he saw the trope of "cute girls doing cute things" as both an asset and a detriment to the viewer's enjoyment. Salvato designed the game as a parody of tropes in romance games, though with disturbing undertones, stating that he was inspired by "things that are scary because they make you uncomfortable, not because they shove scary-looking things in your face". Salvato created characters with Japanese names to emphasise a pseudo-Japanese atmosphere; "Sayori" is a fusion of the Japanese names "Sayuri" and "Saori". Salvato wanted the characters to have human traits and based them on his own experiences, and while writing the game, he found that he was recognising the "reality" of characters like Sayori. He wanted to connect more with the characters, and thus explored things like their "insecurities and realistic personality traits" on top of their "stock archetypes". She was the strongest case of real-world inspiration, with her being inspired directly by those around Salvato with depression.

Due to Salvato's lack of artistic skills at the time, he created the designs of Sayori and other characters in a free anime-creation program, which were used in a test version of the game; Salvato recognised that a product of such quality would not satisfy potential players. A friend of Salvato, who was also a translator for the Sekai Project, designed the uniforms and hairstyles of Sayori and the other girls. Sayori's final in-game character design was initially handled by the artist Kagefumi, but following her departure from the game's development, the freelance artist Satchely took over.

== Character history ==
Sayori is one of the four non-playable characters in Doki Doki Literature Club! alongside Yuri, Natsuki, and Monika, all of whom belong to their school's literature club. Sayori also appears in the enhanced version of the game, Doki Doki Literature Club Plus!, which features multiple "side stories" depicting the club's origin and the relationships between its members.

In Doki Doki Literature Club!, she convinces the protagonist to join the club, where she, along with the other members of the club, writes poetry. By writing poems, the player can try to romance either Sayori, Natsuki, or Yuri. Throughout the course of the game, the poems written by Sayori are initially lighthearted but become more depressing. She eventually tells the protagonist about her depression and later confesses her love to him – the player can either reciprocate her feelings or reaffirm their friendship. Regardless of the player's response, the next day, the protagonist discovers that she committed suicide by hanging, seemingly ending the game and sending the player back to the game's title screen.

Following Sayori's suicide, the player's save files are deleted. When the player creates a new game file, the game's story occurs as normal, but without Sayori. Monika reveals to the player in the game's climax that as part of her attempts to be in a relationship with them, she went into the game's code and amplified Sayori's depression to make her less appealing to the player, and eventually deleted Sayori from the game.

Once the player restores the game to its original state but without Monika, there are two possible endings, both of which involve Sayori becoming the club's president in Monika's place and attaining self-awareness. In one, she has an obsessive personality like Monika, prompting Monika to delete Sayori and then the rest of the game, believing the game cannot continue to exist. The other is achieved when the player has spent time with all the girls before Sayori's death, in which Sayori thanks the player for making everyone happy. A third, earlier ending may occur if the player deletes Monika's character file before the end of the game's first act, which causes Sayori to panic and crash the game – when the player reopens the game, an image of Sayori hanging herself is displayed.

== Critical reception ==
Cosplay of Sayori at NärCon Sommar 2024 in Linköping, Sweden

Sayori has been generally well-received by critics, and has inspired merchandise such as model figurines. Kotaku writer Gita Jackson grew attached to Sayori, seeing "a little of my confused, sad teenage self in her". The writer Ana Valens considered Sayori her favourite character in the game, and she felt that Sayori's struggles with depression were the most memorable of Monika's manipulation of the girls' character traits. Writing for Prima Games, Morgan Shaver labeled Sayori's premature ending as the game's "bad ending", stating that the ending is "absolutely heartbreaking as it makes it seem like Sayori suffers more than she does with the other two endings". André Lamartine of Gamereactor included Sayori's suicide in the publication's "Gaming Moments that Shocked Us" series; Lamartine stated that he and a friend played Doki Doki Literature Club! for fun, and when they reached the scene of Sayori's suicide, "the funny mood died for me and my friend. I laughed because there was really no other way to react".

The game's portrayal of Sayori's depression has received positive reception from critics. In a Kotaku article, Jackson also stated that the scene of Sayori confessing her depression to the protagonist was impactful as she felt that it was not "a cheap way to garner sympathy", opining that this style of writing contributed to the game's success. Fanbyte writer Kara Dennison found Sayori to be an "intelligent take" on mental illness, viewing her to be a deep and complex portrayal. Dennison found Sayori's struggles to be similar to ones she went through in real life. Christopher Patterson of the University of British Columbia observed that Sayori's suicide was part of Doki Doki Literature Club!'s attempts to revise visual novel character archetypes by exposing them as "artificial fetishes and interchangeable elements within [the player's mind]". However, Patterson also argued that in doing so, the game reduces the characters to "artificial intelligence" by "reproducing techno-orientalist Asian racializations" and presents a depiction "akin to Madame Butterfly, whose maddening love and suicidal fawning is reserved for the Western player only".

Sky LaRell Anderson of the University of Saint Thomas, while feeling that the portrayal of her mental illnesses was accurate, begrudged that the game did not take advantage of the interactivity of its medium in depicting them and viewed that the game's portrayal of Sayori's depression as a "a horror-filled experience that inevitably leads to suicide" to be contrived. Writing for IGN Japan, Shohei Fujita felt that if the player chooses to reject Sayori's love confession, then her suicide is ethical as despite Sayori repeatedly expressing romantic feelings to the protagonist, the protagonist views their relationship as a friendship, causing her to experience "intense despair and melancholy" – he viewed that the rejection and Sayori's suicide only work because Sayori is treated as an independent individual. Fujita suggested that the game becomes unethical if, following the player's rejection, Sayori is unchanged by remaining with the protagonist and being "still as cute as before", which he viewed to be objectification. (Note: Fujita stated that visual novels with such a plot point are "always marked with an '18+' tag. This is to prevent children from mistakenly believing that becoming a sexual slave is a natural human state".)

== Analysis ==
=== Characterization ===
Writers, such as Anderson and Ana Valens, have analyzed Sayori's characterization, particularly how the game portrays her depression. Anderson stated that Sayori's depression prevented the protagonist from forming a romantic relationship with her – the standard goal of a dating simulator – as the contradicting romantic feelings amplify her depression. Gita Jackson discussed one of Sayori's poems, "Bottles". She felt the poem spoke of Sayori's desire to make others happy, only for her efforts to be rejected, leaving her with no happiness for herself. They contrasted Sayori's depression to other visual novels; where characters will have emotional problems that need to be solved by the player, Sayori's is not so easily solved. Jackson also interpreted the poem to be part of what Salvato describes the game's events as "an inevitable tragedy". Writing for VG247, Valens commented that Sayori's desire for her friends to be happy worsened her depression and cited it to be an example of Doki Doki Literature Club! demonstrating that many visual novels "overlook the complex and uncomfortable emotions that can reside inside the people we love". Valens also interpreted Sayori as a pansexual character. She cited a scene where Sayori called Natsuki cute and put her hands on her shoulders; while acknowledging that girls calling each other cute is normal for straight people, the physical interaction was less so. This, combined with a later scene, suggested to her that gender was not a relevant factor to attraction for Sayori. She also felt that this could be relevant to Sayori's depression, commenting that a society that expects women to date men can be difficult for non-straight women, feeling that Sayori mirrors herself in these aspects.

The academics Fanny Barnabé of the Université de Namur and Peter Spearman of the College of Charleston have observed that when the player inspects Doki Doki Literature Club!'s game file in order to delete Monika's character file, they may encounter other files that contain hidden information. If the player opens a computer file representing Sayori's character and decodes its contents, (Note: Sayori's file contains an unintelligible audio clip. If the audio file is run through a spectrogram, a QR code is displayed. When the QR code is scanned, it leads to a website entitled "projectlibitina.com".) they discover logs detailing tests conducted on a human subject by a religious cult and referencing the "Third Eye", a recurring motif in the game. The two have commented that the contents of these files, such as Sayori's, have been interpreted by fans as a teaser for a new game developed by Team Salvato – Fanny Barnabé noted that fans have interpreted these files to be part of an alternate reality game to promote the new game. Barnabé also posited that these hidden files are part of Doki Doki Literature Club!'s attempts to encourage the player to further explore the game's story. Peter Spearman observed that players have also used these files to build additional "lore" of the game.

=== Suicide ===
External media
- "Sayo-nara" in the Doki Doki Literature Club! soundtrack

The writers Sara Bowden of Northwestern University and Marcos Gaspar have studied the scene of the player discovering Sayori's suicide, particularly the scene's background track "Sayo-nara" and its role as a transition for Doki Doki Literature Club! to introduce its darker themes. In a research paper analysing the use of sound and music in the game, Bowden noted that there was no prior audio warning of this transition. She observed that "Sayo-nara" is an altered version of the game's menu song; this iteration, which contains dissonance, amplifies the horror behind Sayori's death and "generates one of the most powerful horror moments in the game".

Writing for RPGFan, Marcos Gaspar noted that the song is an indication that "this cutesy game is not for the faint of heart", and commented that the song's distorted intro, use of dissonance, unsettling vocals, and a lone piano playing simple arpeggios "sent the hairs on the back of my neck standing". Shohei Fujita noted that during this scene, glitch effects that take place – she viewed it to indicate that Sayori's suicide was caused by the game system rather than the protagonist's response to her confession. She also noticed that a file gets added to the player's computer system during the scene; Fujita interpreted the file to symbolise a girl obtaining the choice of life and death, thereby "[instilling] an unfathomable terror in the player".

The aftermath of Sayori's suicide has also been analyzed – writers, such as Ana Valens and Peter Spearman, have observed that the suicide is an inevitable event in the game, even if the player tries to prevent it by selecting a different save file of the game and choosing the other option when Sayori confesses her love to the protagonist. The academic Sean Travers argued that the game reprimands the player for their desensitization towards violent content and attempts to change Sayori's outcome by deleting their previous save files. He felt that this causes the player to experience symptoms of perpetrator trauma "in relation to video gaming specifically" for their actions. Cassandra Barkman of the Swinburne University of Technology observed that the player returning to the game's menu once the scene ended is the first time "the machine [takes] over what was originally a nondiegetic operator act". She highlighted this to be a "significant instance" of interactional metalepsis within the game, but viewed it to be "defined not by interaction, but a lack of it". Writers, like Michael Pementel of Bloody Disgusting and Sean Travers, have also observed that following Sayori's suicide, the game becomes more violent and gets disrupted by glitches, with Peter Spearman stating that Sayori's death "dissolves any illusion that this game is a Bishōjo".
