= Girl Fight (video game) =

2013 video game

- Developer: Kung Fu Factory
- Publisher: Majesco
- Platforms: PlayStation 3, Xbox 360
- Release: PlayStation 3: NA: September 24, 2013; EU: October 2, 2013; Xbox 360: NA/EU: September 25, 2013
- Genre: Fighting
- Modes: Single-player, multiplayer

Girl Fight is a 2013 erotic fighting game developed by Kung Fu Factory, produced by MicroProse and published by Majesco. It was released in September 2013 for PlayStation 3 via PlayStation Network and for Xbox 360 via Xbox Live Arcade. The game received negative reviews from critics, calling it low-budget and poorly made while criticizing its emphasis on sexual aspects.

== Reception ==
Reception

Aggregate score
Aggregator	Score
Metacritic	(PS3) 34/100 (X360) 35/100

Review scores
Publication	Score
Hardcore Gamer	2/5
Official Xbox Magazine (UK)	3.5/10
IGN Italia	4/10

Girl Fight received an aggregate score of 35/100 for the PlayStation 3 version and 34/100 for the Xbox 360 version, both indicating "generally unfavorable reviews".

Nikola Suprak of Hardcore Gamer rated it 2/5 points, likening it to "a dumb version of Dead or Alive". He criticized the enemy AI as "awful" even on the hardest difficulty, and noted a lack of different fighting moves between characters. Heidi Kemps of Official Xbox Magazine rated it 3.5/10 points, calling it "stupefyingly unattractive" and "hilariously un-sexy" despite its supposed emphasis on sex appeal, and calling Skullgirls and Dead or Alive 5 Ultimate "far superior products". Lorenzo Baldo of IGN Italia rated the game 4/10 points, calling it "disgraceful" and immature, and saying that feminists would be right to be angry about the game.
