= Monika (Doki Doki Literature Club!) =

Video game character

- Doki Doki Literature Club! character
- Monika in Doki Doki Literature Club!
- First appearance: Doki Doki Literature Club! (2017)
- Created by: Dan Salvato
- Designed by: Salvato; Satchely

In-universe information
- Nationality: Japanese

Monika is the main antagonist of the visual novel Doki Doki Literature Club!. She initially appears as a supporting character to the game's three love interests. She is later revealed to be self-aware of her existence as a video game character, and her actions become increasingly malicious as she makes her intentions to delete the three love interests clear. At the end of the game, the player deletes Monika from the game, but she returns to destroy the game itself and protect the player when the game is replayed and the love interest Sayori becomes sentient in Monika's absence.

Dan Salvato, the creator of Doki Doki Literature Club!, designed the game as a parody of Japanese dating sims and their tropes. Monika was designed for the game as a villain meant to unnerve the player, as well as a character who exaggerates the other characters' tropes to horrifying extents. She has been well-received by critics, many of which praising her relation to the fourth wall, as well how she makes the player question whether or not she can be considered human.

== Concept and creation ==
Monika was created by Dan Salvato for the video game Doki Doki Literature Club! (DDLC). She is initially presented as the president of the literature club who may help the player romance one of the club's three other members – Sayori, Natsuki, and Yuri – while not being a romantic option herself. As the game progresses, the other characters in the game became erratic. The cause of this is eventually revealed to be Monika realizing she is a character in a video game and editing the game's files to make the characters unlikable to the player.

Discussing the creation of Monika and her abilities, Salvato explained that he was inspired by "things that are scary because they make you uncomfortable, not because they shove scary-looking things in your face". In creating the game's horror elements, Salvato drew inspiration from the video games Yume Nikki and Eversion, emphasizing to his team that he wanted the market for visual novels to become more exploratory and less reliant on the same plot concepts. The game's other characters, namely Sayori, Natsuki, and Yuri, were based around standard anime archetypes—a girl next door, a tsundere, and a shy, studious, introvert respectively—and were given Japanese names to emphasize a pseudo-Japanese atmosphere characteristic of Western-produced visual novel. The sole exception to these formats is Monika, who received an English name as a hint to her individual nature compared to the other characters. In an interview with the gaming news website Denfaminico Gamer, Salvato discussed how, by the end of the game, Monika came to respect the game she is in. When localizing the game into Japanese, the localizers had difficulties with the "Just Monika" translation, ultimately settling on "Monika dake" as an unofficial translation.

Because Salvato lacked artistic skill, he used a free online anime art creation program to create the initial character design of Monika and the other characters. Salvato recognized that a product of such quality would not satisfy potential players, so he sent a request to his friend for sketches of school uniforms and hairstyles for the characters. Monika's final character sprite was created by Satchely. Her sprite was created in several parts to give the poses more variety.

== Character history ==
Monika, at the beginning of Doki Doki Literature Club!, was one of the four members of the titular literature club, serving as its president preparing for an upcoming festival. She was in this club with fellow members Sayori, Yuri, and Natsuki, with the newest member being the protagonist. Eventually, she discovered that the world is a dating sim, causing her to change her attitude towards the other girls now knowing she was never a romantic prospect of the protagonist, having been written to be a two-dimensional supporting character. She later found out that, as the president of the club, she is able to manipulate the code of the game, which she used to emphasize Sayori's depression and Yuri's self-harm tendencies in the hope that the player would choose to date her. Sayori and later Yuri committed suicide as a result of this. Eventually, after Monika had deleted every character's file except her own, she talked directly to the player, stating her love for them and talking to them about different topics until the player found her files in the game's programming and deletes her. She was initially furious, but later regretted how she treated the others and restored the game without her, making Sayori the club's president. After this, the game has two possible endings: one in which Sayori develops the same obsessive personality as Monika, causing Monika to come back and delete the game for good, and another in which Sayori thanks the player for their dedication, which only occurs if the player had used save states to spend time with all of the game's love interests before Sayori's suicide.

== Reception ==
Cosplay of Monika at Crunchyroll Expo Australia 2022 in Melbourne, Australia

Monika is one of DDLC!'s most popular characters, with several Internet memes being made about her, most notably those pertaining to the phrase "Just Monika" which she repeats in the third act of the game. This level of popularity was surprising to Dan Salvato. In a poll of ITMedia readers, Monika was voted the most popular of the game's cast. She received nearly half the total votes, with many respondents replying with "Just Monika". She has received various pieces of merchandise, including a Nendoroid figure by Good Smile and merchandise at Spencer Gifts. She also received multiple accessories, including a tote bag and, along with the rest of DDLC's cast, a wrist watch. During the game's ending, if the player listens to Monika for long enough, she will reveal that she has a Twitter account, which contains tweets written from Monika's in-universe perspective and was created in February 2017, seven months before the game's release. The discovery of this account spurred the creation of numerous fan roleplay accounts for other DDLC characters who interact with both Monika's account and each other.

Critically, Monika has been generally well-received. Petrana Radulović of Polygon identified Monika as one of the best video game characters of the 2010s, discussing the epiphany Monika has about showing her love for the player by allowing them to be free. ITMedia writer Sunayoshi Izumo considered her both the best character in the game, as well as one of the best female characters of the past 10 years. They discussed Monika's loneliness, stating that her feelings resonated with them. They also commented that Monika's final words at the end of the game struck them, and encouraged lonely people to play the game so they could hear Monika's words too. Destructoid writer Charlotte Cutts regarded Monika as a "detestable character", stating that from the beginning of the game, something felt off about her. GameSpot writer Jordan Ramée criticized the handling of Monika's twist in the console versions of the game, stating that it took away the sense that Monika was taking over the player's PC. He discussed how he felt fear while playing the PC version, but not the Nintendo Switch version, saying she did not seem as alive. Shohei Fujita, writing for IGN Japan, talked about the moment where Monika and the player are alone as being frightening, worried that things like glitches or startling elements might occur. Fujita noted that he spent 30 minutes listening to her talk, finding what she said thought-provoking. He identified Monika as one of the game's best aspects. PCGamesN writer Mitch Jay Lineham considered Monika's story tragic, discussing how she is just a side character in a video game, and how the player and the real world represent a place where she can be more than that.

== Analysis ==
Game Informer writer Jacob Geller drew parallels between Monika and the concepts of the television series Westworld, set in a world with androids called "hosts" who were initially designed to be non-sentient but slowly gain sentience due to one of the hosts' creators altering their code. He questioned whether Monika was conscious or not, and whether a copy and paste of a human mind could still be considered human. Matthew Allan of Press Start compared Monika to a phantom haunting the game, noting how in the second act she appears in front of the game's user interface "as a ghost would through the walls of a haunted manor". Peter Spearman of the College of Charleston and Fanny Barnabé of the Université de Namur noted how text which appears on the game's website and Steam download page was written by Monika, with Spearman observing that Monika's inviting tone illustrated how the game "alludes to some of the most sexualizing aspects of the [dating sim] genre".

Welcome to the Literature Club! It’s always been a dream of mine to make something special out of the things I love. Now that you’re a club member, you can help me make that dream come true in this cute game!

— Monika, DDLC's official website

Additionally, Barnabé observed that when one looks at the game's files to delete Monika, they may find additional files with hidden information. One of these is a poem written by Monika labeled "iiiiiiiiiiiiiiiiiiiiiiiiiiiiiiiiiiiiiiiiiiiiiiii.txt" which manifests her distress from being a prisoner of the game. When Monika's character file is renamed from "monika.chr" to "monika.png", it displays a block of black and white pixels which can be converted to alphanumeric text. This generated a Base64 string which translates to mysterious text referring to a "Third Eye".

=== Characterization ===
Some writers have discussed Monika's characterization and personality. Christopher B. Patterson, writing for American Literature, labelled Monika as a yandere, a term which describes a character who is madly in love with someone to the point that they act "sickly". Spearman disputed this categorization, noting that unlike most yanderes, Monika's violent acts are partially as a result of frustration from not fully being human. Fanbyte writer Kara Dennison called Monika "pretty, intelligent, athletic, and motivated", though noted that she exhibits tendencies that may be symptoms of narcissistic personality disorder. These traits include her constant need for attention, identifying others as not being real, and ability to delete her friends without any concern. Additionally, she discussed how narcissists may defame others to gain attention, drawing contrast between defamatory posts on social media and Monika's modification of the other girls' code. Sky LaRell Anderson of the University of Saint Thomas described Monika's exaggeration of the girls' personalities as "mind-rape", stating that "[t]he game portrays her co-dependence and mental instability as a manifestation of evil".

=== Ending ===
Multiple academic writers have analyzed Monika and DDLC's ending in the context of the fourth wall – the imaginary wall which separates a narrative from its audience. Narratologie writer Laura Goudet noted that while the other three girls appear to look away from or past the player, Monika looks directly at them, demonstrating how Monika is aware of the player and the fact her world is just a game. She later described Monika's state during the game's third act as an "existential crisis", with Monika telling the player that it feels like she and they are the only real people in the game's word, asserting to herself that she is more than just a video game character. David Christopher and Aidan Leuszler, writing for Games and Culture, described how deleting Monika in the game's ending breaks the fourth wall "with […] convincing and unsettling precision", as it creates the feeling that the player is still under Monika's manipulation even when outside the game. Allan and Barnabé noted that Monika's awareness of her existence as a video game character is foreshadowed through comedy as early as the game's first act, where Monika tells the player to save their game if a difficult decision arrives as a "writing tip" before playing it off as a joke.

The author Theresa Krampe contrasted Monika's deletion with the ending of the metafictional video game Pony Island. While both games share similar messaging and force the player to delete part of the game's data to progress, the deletion mechanics in Pony Island take place wholly within the game, contrasting the process of deleting Monika's literal character file. Krampe noted that this make's the ending of DDLC "much more radical in that it genuinely transcends its own boundaries on a formal level". Spearman observed similarities between the third act of DDLC and the creepypasta Ben Drowned, in which a young boy who drowned haunts a cartridge of The Legend of Zelda: Majora's Mask, noting that both stories emphasize the divide between the virtual and real worlds.
