= Eversion (video game) =

2008 video game

- Developer: Zaratustra Productions
- Publisher: Zaratustra Productions
- Designer: Guilherme S. Tows
- Composers: Matthew Steele; Miroslav Malesevic
- Platforms: Windows; OS X; Linux
- Release: Microsoft Windows: WW: December 29, 2008; Mac OS X, Linux: WW: August 15, 2012
- Genre: Platform
- Mode: Single-player

Eversion is a platform game by British indie studio Zaratustra Productions for Microsoft Windows. It was originally released as freeware in 2008, with a high-definition remake being released on Steam and Humble Bundle in 2010.

== Gameplay ==
Eversion is a side-scrolling platform game in which the player's flower-like avatar is tasked with collecting gems scattered throughout the stages and reaching the flag that marks the stage's end. At specific points, the player may activate an "eversion" ability that changes the state of the stage by removing obstacles and creating platforms, making it a necessary tool for progress. The game includes a bare-bones narrative centering on the rescue of a captured princess and initially presents a colorful and whimsical atmosphere. However, as use of the eversion ability increases, the visuals become unsettling and nightmarish. As such, a note indicating that the game is not "for children or those of a nervous disposition" is posted on the official website and within the game. The high-definition version includes a new ending and a competitive "time attack" mode.

== Development and release ==
Eversion was created in 2008 by indie developer Zaratustra as part of indie game community TIGSource's 2008 Commonplace Book Competition. The competition's name and concept were derived from a commonplace book kept by American author H. P. Lovecraft, in which he would jot down strange and often disjointed story ideas, generally lacking in context. Eversion was particularly inspired by an entry that reads "sounds - possibly musical - heard in the night from other worlds or realms of being".

== Legacy ==
Doki Doki Literature Club! creator Dan Salvato cited Eversion as a source of inspiration for his game's horror elements.
