= E-Hentai =

Community-oriented image hosting and file sharing website focused on hentai

- Website type: Image hosting, file sharing
- Available in: English
- Founded: July 1, 2005; 21 years ago (Current ownership)
- Predecessor: July 1, 1999; 27 years ago (Yahoo! group)
- Owner: Tenboro
- Website: e-hentai.org
- Launched: March 20, 2007; 19 years ago (as user galleries)
- Current status: Active

E-Hentai is an image-hosting and file-sharing website focused on hentai (Japanese cartoon pornography). The site hosts user-generated image galleries primarily of pornographic content originating or derived from anime, manga, and video games, such as fanart, scanlations of manga and dōjinshi, and cosplay photographs. Its sister site Exhentai (colloquially known as Sad Panda) was spun off from E-Hentai in 2010 to host artwork that depicts material that is illegal in certain jurisdictions, such as lolicon, shotacon, and bestiality.

== History ==
E-Hentai launched as a Yahoo! Group on July 1, 1999. The group moved to a .net domain in 2001 before moving to its current .org domain in 2005 after ownership of its .net domain lapsed and was purchased by another party. On March 27, 2010, E-Hentai announced that in response to pressure from advertisers, it would no longer host artwork depicting underage characters (lolicon and shotacon) and bestiality. Existing galleries containing this content were deleted from the site, amounting to the removal of approximately 30,000 of the website's 150,000 galleries; this content was later spun off onto Exhentai, a sister site to E-Hentai. Access to Exhentai requires an existing E-Hentai account; for individuals without an account, Exhentai appears as a blank page with an illustration of a crying panda, and has consequently has earned the nickname "Sad Panda" among users of the site. In June 2019, both sites were removed from Google, per the company's policy of de-listing websites that violate the Digital Millennium Copyright Act.

On July 26, 2019, E-Hentai and Exhentai announced that both sites would shut down in response to "recent legislative changes in the Netherlands", where the servers of the sites were hosted at the time. Vice speculated that the shutdown was in reaction to the Directive on Copyright in the Digital Single Market adopted by the European Union in June 2019, which makes digital platforms legally liable for material posted by users that violates copyright, as well as a July 2019 proposal by Dutch Minister of Justice Ferdinand Grapperhaus to impose harsher punishments on websites that do not rapidly remove child pornography. 24 hours' notice was given for the shutdown of Exhentai, leading users on the image board 4chan to attempt to archive the entire site before it closed on July 27. On August 2, 2019, Exhentai relaunched after its servers relocated to Moldova.

== Operations ==
Works posted to E-Hentai and Exhentai are typically pirated and are uploaded without the consent or knowledge of the original creators. The site is owned and operated by an anonymous moderator who uses the handle Tenboro and is funded through a combination of advertising revenue and donations; in 2009, E-Hentai estimated its annual hosting costs at USD$46,000, with donations covering "less than half" of operating costs. In 2019, Tenboro stated that a persistent tendon injury limited their ability to perform timely maintenance on the website and that they were considering options for its future, such as naming a successor moderator or preserving the website as a permanent archive.

== Impact ==
Collectively, E-Hentai and Exhentai are one of the largest databases of hentai manga and contain over 1,000,000 image galleries. The site hosts both original Japanese hentai manga and scanlations in multiple languages, including Chinese, English, French, German, Korean, Portuguese, Russian, Spanish, and Thai. At its peak popularity, the commercial web traffic company Alexa ranked E-Hentai as the 264th-most popular website on the internet. Outlets have noted that E-Hentai functions as a de facto archive for artwork that is rare or non-existent on other physical and digital platforms; the site hosts content such as Comiket-exclusive works (dōjin) and out-of-print art books that are both pornographic and non-pornographic in nature, with Vice calling the website the "Alexandria Library [sic] of hentai". The Daily Dot described E-Hentai as "a relic of 'the old internet'", citing it as an example of niche portals for digital content that predate contemporary social media.

== See also ==
- Fakku
- Legal aspects of file sharing
