= Doki Doki Literature Club! =

2017 video game

- Cover art with the main characters (from left to right): Sayori, Yuri, Monika, and Natsuki
- Developer: Team Salvato
- Publishers: Team Salvato; Serenity Forge (Plus!, mobile)
- Designer: Dan Salvato
- Programmer: Dan Salvato
- Artists: Satchely; VelinquenT
- Writer: Dan Salvato
- Composers: Dan Salvato; Nikki Kaelar (Plus!); Jason Hayes (Plus!); Azuria Sky (Plus!)
- Engine: Ren'Py; Unity (Plus!, mobile)
- Platforms: Original; macOS; Windows; Linux (Note: On itch.io only); iOS; Android (Note: On April 9, 2026, the game was removed from the Google Play Store after violating Google Play's Terms of Service. The developers are currently working to have the game reinstated on Google Play, and had reinstated the game on Epic Games Store on September 18, 2026.); Plus!; Nintendo Switch; PlayStation 4; PlayStation 5; Windows; Xbox One; Xbox Series X/S; macOS; Android; iOS
- Release: Original: WW: September 22, 2017; Plus!: WW: June 30, 2021
- Genre: Visual novel
- Mode: Single-player

Doki Doki Literature Club! (DDLC) is a 2017 visual novel video game developed by Team Salvato for personal computers and mobile phones. The story follows a student who reluctantly joins his high school's literature club at the insistence of his friend Sayori, and is given the option to pursue her or the other club members, Yuri and Natsuki, romantically. Club president Monika also features heavily in the game's plot. The game features a non-traditional plot structure with multiple endings and unlockable cutscenes with each of the main characters. Although it initially appears to be a light-hearted dating simulator, it is a metafictional psychological horror game that extensively breaks the fourth wall.

The game was developed by Team Salvato, an American independent game studio, in an estimated two-year period by a team led by Dan Salvato, previously known for his modding work as part of Project M. According to Salvato, the inspiration for the game came from his mixed feelings toward anime and a fascination for surreal and unsettling experiences. The game was released as freeware for Linux, macOS, and Windows, initially distributed through itch.io, and later became available on Steam. It was released on iOS and Android on December 10, 2025.

Doki Doki Literature Club! received positive critical attention for its successful use of horror elements and unconventional nature within the visual novel genre. The game also inspired various Internet memes and achieved a large online following. An expanded version of the game, titled Doki Doki Literature Club Plus!, was released as a premium game in 2021 for PCs as well as the Nintendo Switch, PlayStation 4, PlayStation 5, Xbox One, and Xbox Series X/S home consoles. It received generally positive reviews, with praise for its side stories and gameplay on consoles, but some criticism for its lack of changes.

== Gameplay ==
The gameplay of Doki Doki Literature Club! is divided between that of a traditional visual novel (top) and a minigame in which the player must compose a poem (bottom).

Doki Doki Literature Club! is a visual novel. As such, its gameplay has a low level of interactivity and consists of scenes with static two-dimensional images of characters from a first-person perspective, accompanied by occasional choices by which the player advances the plot. The descriptions and dialogue are depicted in the form of accompanying text without voice acting. The game's narration is provided by the game's protagonist (whom the player controls), a member of the titular literature club, to which he was invited by his childhood friend Sayori.

Choices the protagonist makes affect the development of his relationships with key female characters Sayori, Yuri, and Natsuki, but ultimately have little effect on the outcome of the game.

The characters' interactions with the protagonist are primarily influenced by a minigame in which the player "composes" a poem by picking from several sets of words. Each girl in the literature club has different word preferences, and they will react positively when the player picks a word that they like. For narrative reasons, Monika is not represented in this minigame. In accordance with the results of these minigames, the player will experience scenes with whichever character liked that particular poem the most. Each such story arc is divided into three acts and an epilogue, whereupon the game restarts each time with increasingly divergent realities. At a certain point, the player must manipulate the game's files to advance the narrative.

Doki Doki Literature Club Plus! features the entire main story of the original game, and includes a "virtual desktop" that replaces the actual file manipulation, as well as a soundtrack feature and several new "side stories". The side stories depict the relationships between the club members, as well as the formation of the literature club.

== Plot ==
The protagonist is invited by his cheerful best friend Sayori to join their high school's literature club as a remedy for his introversion. He meets the other members: assertive Natsuki, shy Yuri, and confident president Monika. Each day, the members write and share poems. As the club prepares for the upcoming cultural festival, Sayori confides that she has depression. The protagonist either helps Natsuki bake cupcakes or Yuri paint banners; each girl attempts to kiss him. Afterward, he can either confess his love to Sayori or reaffirm his friendship. The next day, Monika shows the protagonist a morbid poem by Sayori consisting only of the phrase "get out of my head". Rushing to her home, the protagonist finds she has hanged herself, and the game abruptly ends.

The player is sent back to the menu, with all previous save files erased. Upon starting a new game, the story restarts without Sayori, and the other characters have no memory of her; Monika introduces the protagonist to the club in lieu of Sayori. Events proceed similarly to the original playthrough, but illegible text, distorted character sprites, and other anomalies become commonplace. Dialogue and unlockable "special poems" reveal that Natsuki is malnourished and being abused by her father, while Yuri grows unstable, obsessive, and prone to self-harm. During planning for the cultural festival, an argument erupts over whom the protagonist will help; the player is forced to choose Monika. Yuri ejects Monika and Natsuki from the room, confesses her love for the protagonist, and fatally stabs herself regardless of the response. The game's broken script forces the protagonist to watch her body decompose over the weekend. When Natsuki returns, she flees in horror and nausea. Monika apologizes for the "boring" weekend, deletes Yuri's and Natsuki's character files, and returns the player to the menu.

A new file begins with the protagonist alone with Monika in what remains of the literature club classroom. She reveals she is a self-aware video game character who can manipulate the game's code. Upset at only being a supporting character, she amplified the other girls' negative traits to make them unlikable, yet failed to stop them from pursuing the protagonist. She then obsessively confesses her own love not to the protagonist, but to the real-life player. Monika will talk indefinitely about various topics until the player deletes her character file from the game directory. She lashes out as she disappears, but ultimately forgives the player and restores the game and characters, excluding herself.

Two possible endings follow depending on the player's actions. In the standard ending, Sayori becomes the club president and thanks the player for dispelling Monika, gaining self-awareness. Monika intervenes via text prompt and deletes her. Realizing that her efforts to make amends have failed, Monika deletes the entire game during the end credits while playing the song "Your Reality". A note from Monika states she has disbanded the club because "no happiness can be found in it", yet thanks the player for joining. A more positive ending occurs if the player viewed all the optional cutscenes and confessed to Sayori before her suicide. Though self-aware, Sayori thanks the player for supporting everyone, tearfully bids farewell, and affirms the members' love. Monika plays "Your Reality" without deleting the game. After the credits, a message from creator Dan Salvato explains his intentions and thanks the player. A premature ending occurs if Monika's file is deleted before a new game. Sayori becomes president, realizes the game's nature, and closes it in a panic. Reopening the game shows an image of her hanged; after ten minutes, the words "now everyone can be happy" appear.

=== Doki Doki Literature Club Plus! ===
In addition to the entire main story, Doki Doki Literature Club Plus! features six new side stories, entitled Trust, Understanding, Respect, Balance, Reflection, and Self-Love, as well as an additional shorter seventh story, Equals. The stories depict the meeting and relationships between the four club members, as well as the formation of the club up until the beginning of the main campaign, with each of the first six stories focusing on a conflict and resolution between two of the characters and the seventh focusing on the friendship between all four of them. Unlike the main campaign, the side stories do not feature any horror elements or discussion of sentience among any of the characters.

As a fictionalized account of how the game was developed, other story-related content is accessible from within the virtual desktop in the form of an email inbox for a company referred to as "Metaverse Enterprise Solutions", as well as within the virtual desktop file folder. Collecting this content tells of a group of researchers from the company who were attempting to utilize a virtual machine referred to as "VM1" to create a simulated universe. The resulting universe contained four entities, one of whom, "A", is granted elevated permissions to access the kernel code, referred to as "Monitor Kernel Access". The universe and entities are studied during events paralleling those of the game's main campaign, and the emails and files discuss the researcher's observations and monitoring of the events, with the stated goal being to observe how "A" would react to the discovery of their artificial existence, to analyze the possibility of the true universe being a simulation. Later discussion is given on the creation of a second "control" universe within VM1, in which "A" is not made aware of their elevated permissions, paralleling the events and settings of the side stories. It is later mentioned that a small group of researchers, who initially refer to themselves as "Team Salvation", plan to transform the contents of VM1 into a visual novel format to ensure the security of the project, implying that the events of Doki Doki Literature Club Plus! depict the contents of both universes within VM1.

The last unlockable email describes a second virtual machine, "VM2", which the researchers successfully built but could not reliably access due to its instability. While they are unable to create a reliable connection to VM2, the researchers observe that the entities within VM2 appeared to be working on an undescribed project, referred to as "Project Libitina", which is implied to be an attempt by the entities to access the world beyond their simulated universe. If the player completes full "data collection", which requires completing all game content and unlocking all secrets, they are granted access to an eighth side story entitled test.vm; entering it would take the player to a blank screen which appears to show a failed server attempt at accessing VM2, alongside one of several hundred different randomly-selected sentences, which appear to describe the world and activities within VM2's universe.

== Development ==
Doki Doki Literature Club! was developed by American programmer Dan Salvato over the course of approximately two years, and is his debut title in the video game industry. Prior to its release, Salvato was known for creating the FrankerFaceZ extension for Twitch, his modding work in the Super Smash Bros. scene, and for his custom Super Mario Maker levels. Salvato was inspired to create a visual novel by his "love-hate relationship" with anime, and emphasized the abundant use of clichés in the genre and the frequent plots centering around "cute girls doing cute things", which he saw as both an asset and a detriment to the viewer's enjoyment. Salvato sought to create a title that would attract the player's attention regardless of how they personally view anime.

Discussing the horror elements of the game, Salvato explained that he was inspired by "things that are scary because they make you uncomfortable, not because they shove scary-looking things in your face." To achieve this, Salvato developed the façade of a cute setting, which would break down over time along with the behavior of the characters, and eventually, the role of one evil character who had seized control of the game from the player would be revealed. In creating the game's horror elements, Salvato drew inspiration from Yume Nikki and Eversion, and emphasized to his team that he wanted the market for visual novels to become much more daring and less reliant on the same plot concepts. The game's characters were based on standard anime archetypes and were given Japanese names to emphasize a pseudo-Japanese atmosphere characteristic of Western-produced visual novels. The sole exception to this format is Monika, who received an English name as a hint to her individual nature compared to the other characters.

The prototype versions of the cast of Doki Doki Literature Club! (from left to right: Sayori, Yuri, Monika, and Natsuki) were created by Dan Salvato in a free online program for creating anime characters.

Because Salvato lacked artistic skill, he used a free online anime-creation program to create the initial character designs and applied these designs in test versions of the game. Salvato recognized that a product of such quality would not satisfy potential players, so he requested from his friend, a translator for Sekai Project, for sketches of school uniforms and hairstyles for the characters. Salvato then handed initial visual development over to Kagefumi, who left the project very early on. After Kagefumi departed from the project, Salvato contacted the freelance artist Satchely, who created the final character sprites over the course of a few months. The sprites were created in several parts to give the poses more variety. The background images were created as three-dimensional models, and then processed by the artist VelinquenT.

Salvato also composed the game's score. The introductory composition, "Doki Doki Literature Club!", is primarily performed by piano and flute with accompaniment by string instruments. The composition "Okay, Everyone!" has five different versions, four of which are performed by different musical instruments that represent each of the four female characters. Monika's version emphasizes the piano, Yuri's version uses pizzicato and harps, Natsuki's version is played by xylophone and recorder, and Sayori's is played by ukulele. The game's score is generally calm and serene, except for two tracks, "Sayo-nara" and "Just Monika", which are ominous in tone. "Your Reality", a vocal song performed over the end credits, is sung by Jillian Ashcraft.

== Release ==
Logo of Doki Doki Literature Club!

Logo of Doki Doki Literature Club Plus!

Doki Doki Literature Club! was first released on September 22, 2017, on itch.io, and was later also released on Steam. The game is available as freeware with an optional pay what you want model. Paying a certain amount unlocks a bonus "Fan Pack" that includes desktop and mobile wallpapers, the game's official soundtrack, and a digital concept art booklet. The game's soundtrack was released on two CDs consisting of 15 and 10 tracks respectively. The first CD contains all the main compositions of the game, while the second consists of remixes and alternative arrangements. On September 28, 2017, Dan Salvato posted an additional Doki Doki Literature Club! music soundtrack piece called "doki17.mp3" to the unofficial Doki Doki Literature Club! Discord server, referring to it as "an unfinished track that never made it into the game" which "[while] pretty far from finished [was] still somewhat pleasant". The soundtrack saw another release by iam8bit on "crimson smoke" vinyl in the first quarter of 2019.

In January 2020, Salvato announced that new content would be added to Doki Doki Literature Club!, but clarified that he was not making a sequel to the game. On June 11, 2021, Team Salvato and publisher Serenity Forge announced that a premium edition of Doki Doki Literature Club!, titled Doki Doki Literature Club Plus!, would be digitally released for the Nintendo Switch, PlayStation 4, PlayStation 5, Windows, Xbox One, and Xbox Series X/S on June 30. A physical version for the Nintendo Switch, PlayStation 4, and PlayStation 5 would also be sold via Serenity Forge's online store. On April 4, 2021, it was announced that PQube would distribute the physical edition of the game in Europe. On the day of the release of Plus, it was announced that the game would be localized and released in Japan by Playism later that year. Plus was released for macOS on August 12, 2021.

The expanded version features a visual upgrade to full high definition, six new side stories, 100 unlockable images, 13 new music tracks by Nikki Kaelar, Jason Hayes and Azuria Sky, and a music player with the option of creating customized playlists or repeating a single track in an indefinite loop. The side stories take place outside the original game's continuity and depict how the club members met and became friends. The game was ported from the original Ren'Py engine to Unity, which allowed the implementation of additional features, and consistent cross-platform development. Physical copies of Plus! were announced to be released on July 30, 2021, but were pushed back to the end of September, and later October, due to the COVID-19 pandemic.

On December 10, 2025, Doki Doki Literature Club Plus! was released for Android and iOS devices although its under the Doki Doki Literature Club! title and branding, and with the original story being free and having additional features, the original story had minimal changes to gameplay to ensure a mobile-friendly environment.

On April 9, 2026, the mobile version of Doki Doki Literature Club was removed from Google Play after it violated the store's Terms of Service over its depiction of sensitive themes. Dan Salvato and Serenity Forge, the publishers of the mobile version of the game, confirmed that they would work on finding a path to reinstate the game on Google Play while they look into alternative methods to distribute the game on Android devices.

== Reception ==
Reception

Aggregate scores
Aggregator	Score
Metacritic	PC: 78/100; NS: 85/100; PC (Plus!): 82/100; PS5: 80/100; XSX: 89/100
OpenCritic	71% recommend

Review scores
Publication	Score
Jeuxvideo.com	18/20
RPGFan	90%
GameGrin	8.5/10
Quarter to Three	4/5

Awards
Publication	Award
IGN	Best PC Game of 2017 (People's Choice)
SXSW Gaming Awards	Matthew Crump Cultural Innovation Award

The game was received positively by critics, and accumulated a score of 78/100 on Metacritic based on seven reviews. Fellow review aggregator OpenCritic assessed that the game received "mighty" approval, being recommended by 71% of critics.

Steven T. Wright of PC Gamer described the game as "a post-modern love letter to the genre it represents", and compared its deconstructive quality to Undertale and Pony Island. Robert Fenner of RPGFan noted that traditionally, major visual novel developers such as Key and 5pb. produced lengthy day-by-day narratives of a standard anime protagonist's relationships with their supporting cast. According to Fenner, previous attempts to revise the format, such as Hatoful Boyfriend and Higurashi no Naku Koro ni, could not escape the conventions of their genre and fully reveal their dramatic potential. He then declared that Doki Doki Literature Club! had succeeded in this field by making unusual use of the Ren'Py engine and providing unexpected plot twists.

Reviewers emphasized that the game achieves its surprising impact on the player due to its outward resemblance to typical eroge games: it has a pronounced anime style in its character design, and the game's goal is to develop a relationship with one of the characters. In addition, the characters consist of anime stereotypes whose behavior is sparsely displayed through their sprites, and the game's musical accompaniment is light, bouncy, gentle and playful. According to critics, these aspects combined to create the impression of a standard visual novel that would prompt the player to become attached to the characters. VisualNovelist of Jeuxvideo.com positively compared the game's visual quality to Everlasting Summer, another independent visual novel with the appearance of a professional production. Reviewers pointed out that the game's horror was built on the destruction of a sense of control over what happens in the game and the feeling of helplessness that stems from the distortions in the game's world. Victoria Rose of Polygon stated that this approach was strikingly different from traditional horror games and films, where the viewer remains alienated from what is happening on the screen. Amy Josuweit of Rock, Paper, Shotgun noted that while earlier visual novels have broken the fourth wall by crashing the client or adding extra files, Doki Doki Literature Club! changed the angle by deliberately destroying files rather than adding them.

GQ's Tom Philip commented that at times the narrative felt like "a slog, clicking through endless amounts of inane, flirty conversation about poetry." Fenner opined that the game did not pass the Bechdel test and positioned the protagonist as a seductive casanova. However, he emphasized that the plot is ultimately a "sharply aware polemic against harem anime/visual novels" in which "the lengths the ladies go to are not wholly because of the protagonist, but rather he can be read as a symptom—an easy outlet." Fenner also felt that the game, like Katawa Shoujo before it, "appears to veer dangerously close to fetishization of very real issues". Ben "Yahtzee" Croshaw of The Escapist described the game as "a nice little idea with a memorable moment or two", but added that the game "doesn't really have anywhere to go once the rabbit's out of the hat". Nevertheless, reviewers recognized the game's plot focus as successful and relevant. 8 Bit Rambles stated that Doki Doki Literature Club! "revolves around love in its most demented and deconstructive form", and characterized the game as an example of postmodern art.

The game has frequently been cited as a satirical deconstruction of the visual novel genre it depicts. Steven T. Wright for Rock Paper Shotgun noted that even as the pastel-tinged game universe splits apart at its very seams the game still "never turns its many knives on you, the player," instead choosing to self-destruct, "cracking open to reveal nothing but artifice". The game has also been viewed by many as a critique of dating simulators and of the people who play them, emphasized by a quote from the creator Dan Salvato, in which he mentions that he wanted to subvert the traditional visual novel stereotype of "cute girls doing cute things".

At IGN's Best of 2017 Awards, the game won the People's Choice Award each for "Best PC Game", "Best Adventure Game" (for which it was also a runner-up), "Best Story", and "Most Innovative". IGN also featured Doki Doki Literature Club! on their list of the "18 Best Horror Games of 2017" and subsequently as the 12th scariest game of this generation. Nerd Much? included the game on their 2020 list of the "50 Scariest Horror Games of All Time". The game won the "Matthew Crump Cultural Innovation Award" and was nominated for "Trending Game of the Year" at the 2018 SXSW Gaming Awards. EGMNow ranked the game 16th in their list of the 25 Best Games of 2017.

== Cultural impact ==
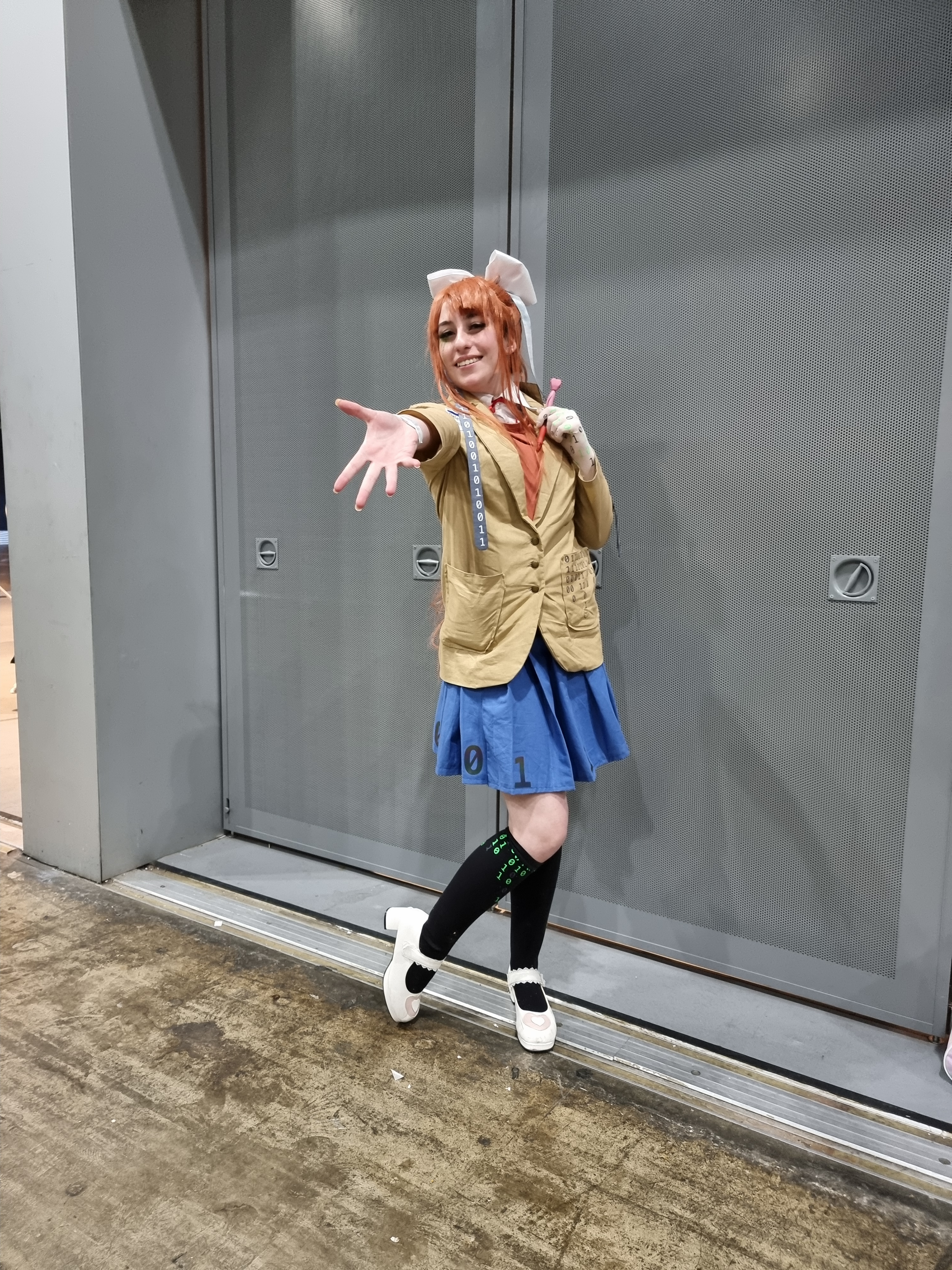
Cosplay of Monika at Crunchyroll Expo Australia 2022 in Melbourne, Australia

In its first three months of release, Doki Doki Literature Club! was downloaded over one million times, and exceeded two million downloads about a month later. It has been Let's Played by several prominent YouTubers such as PewDiePie, Markiplier, Jacksepticeye, Etika, and Arin Hanson and Dan Avidan of the Game Grumps. The game has inspired numerous fanmade mods including Monika After Story, which are also made with the Ren'Py engine. Dan Salvato has reacted positively to the fanmade mods, stating "thanks to the Ren'Py engine, DDLC is excellent and highly accessible for modding, something we hope continues for years to come."

Monika was well-received by fans of the game, becoming one of the game's most popular characters, with several memes (such as "Just Monika") being made about her. Salvato was surprised by Monika's positive reception and massive popularity, stating that he did not expect her to get so popular. Regarding one of the memes surrounding the game, Salvato criticized "Trapsuki", a theory that Natsuki is actually a "trap" due to her broad shoulders and small chest, calling the meme "really disrespectful" and stating he "doesn't like to joke about people's sex/gender, much less try to convince others that it's not what they think".

=== Merchandise ===
Since July 2021, officially licensed Doki Doki Literature Club Nendoroid figurines of the four girls have been released from the Good Smile Company.

On October 9, 2023, Youtooz Collectibles began releasing officially licensed figurines of the main characters of Doki Doki Literature Club! (Monika, Yuri, Natsuki, and Sayori), designed by fans following the results of a competition in June; the following day, the figurine designer for Yuri revealed her design to have been primarily based on Yuri's appearance in The Guy Trapped in Monika's DDLC, a 2022 proof-of-concept theme song for a Doki Doki Literature Club! animated series pitched to Salvato (modelled after Michael Kramer's and Allie Feder's theme music for The Ghost and Molly McGee), directed and animated by Nick Dante, edited by Vannamelon, and starring CoryxKenshin.

Other officially licensed Doki Doki Literature Club! merchandise include clothing and stationery from Ocean in Space, Spencer's, and OMOCAT, plushies and toys from the Sanshee Company, framed in-game artwork from Artovision, pin badges from The Yetee, and watches from SuperGroupies USA.

=== UK controversy ===
On June 26, 2018, 15-year-old Ben Walmsley, a fan of Doki Doki Literature Club! from Bury St Edmunds in Suffolk, died by suicide. His parents mentioned that he was sketching characters from the game and incorrectly stated, due to a misunderstanding of the game's mechanics, that it was played online and that characters could send messages to his son's phone. While his family and a coroner linked the game to his death, members of the Doki Doki Literature Club! community and others suggested Ben likely had pre-existing mental health issues and found themes in the game relatable, rather than the game itself causing the suicide.

Days later, Victoria Derbyshire hosted a debate on her BBC News programme, questioning the effectiveness of a 13+ age rating given the game's mature content aimed at a young anime-style demographic. This led to a wider discussion in the media and in schools about parental supervision of online content and the need for greater awareness of mental health issues in children, with some critics arguing that the parents were deflecting responsibility onto the game rather than addressing pre-existing mental health struggles.

=== In other media ===
On January 1, 2018, the main characters of Doki Doki Literature Club! were added to Yandere Simulator as character skins for the titular character, with Salvato's permission. Later that year, Monika also appeared as a DLC avatar in Gaia Online, however without Salvato's permission.

== See also ==
- Class of '09 – Visual novel video game series
- Katawa Shoujo – 2012 visual novel by Four Leaf Studios
- MiSide – 2014 video game
- Needy Streamer Overload – 2022 visual novel
- Yandere Simulator – Upcoming stealth action video game
- You and Me and Her: A Love Story – 2013 visual novel
