= Saori (television personality) =

Zainichi Korean entertainer (born 1981)

Saori Jang
- Born: Jang Eun-ju (장은주); May 19, 1981 (age 44)
- Origin: Japan
- Genres: Bubblegum pop
- Occupations: singer, model, entertainer

Japanese name
- Kanji: 張 佐緒里
- Kana: チャン・サオリ
Transcriptions
- Romanization: Chan Saori

Korean name
- Hangul: 장은주
- Hanja: 張恩珠
- RR: Jang Eunju
- MR: Chang Ŭnju

Saori (Japanese: 張 佐緒里, Korean: 장은주; born May 19, 1981) is a third-generation Japanese-born Korean who gained fame through guest appearances on KBS's Global Beauties Chat (미녀들의 수다).

== Career ==
Saori's work has varied, and she appears on variety shows as well as commercials, mostly in Japan. In Korea, she appeared in MBC reality show We Got Married, where she was paired up with Jung Hyung Don. However, the couple "divorced" after 8 episodes, Saori left the show while Hyung Don remained behind as a host.

Saori became a singer in 2008, releasing her first single Happy Virus! in May. She quickly gained much popularity.
