= Cute Girls Doing Cute Things =

Anime and manga genre depicting girls in everyday life

Cute Girls Doing Cute Things, known as CGDCT or kūkikei (空気系; lit. 'air-style') in Japan, is a genre or subgenre of manga and anime that focuses on young female characters engaging in everyday activities in a cute way. It is often described as a subgenre of iyashikei or slice of life. It evolved from yonkoma manga and gained mainstream popularity throughout the early 2000s and 2010s with shows such as K-On! and Lucky Star. Despite its popularity, the genre has met a mixed reception, particularly regarding its portrayal of female characters.

== History ==
CGDCT evolved from yonkoma manga, a type of four-panel strip that usually focuses on everyday life due to its limited format. Yonkoma manga is also used to show omake, a term for bonus manga or anime materials which often involve putting characters in surreal or trivial situations. As yonkoma manga developed, many series become more oriented towards otaku culture, eventually giving rise to the genre seen today. In addition, iyashikei, a "healing" genre in which CGDCT is often categorized, became popular in 1995 as a response to the Kobe earthquake and Tokyo subway sarin attack that same year.

Throughout the early 2000s and 2010s, CGDCT anime began to gain increasing popularity, such as K-On!, Sketchbook ~full color's~, and Lucky Star. In particular, the former show is seen as foundational to the rise of the genre. Some described Azumanga Daioh and Yotsuba&! volumes are other examples of the subgenre. This continued in the 2020s with series such as Laid-Back Camp, A Place Further than the Universe, and New Game. One publication, Anime Feminist described Kyoto Animation, a "cute girls doing cute things" studio. The studio produced series such as Lucky Star and K-On!, which have been described as within the subgenre.

The writer and lead developer of Doki Doki Literature Club!, Dan Salvato, said that the subgenre was a negative and a positive for series and visual novels Some asserted that the visual novel hints that it subverts the subgenre. Reviewers for Anime Feminist and Anime News Network described Asobi Asobase as another subversion of the subgenre.

== Characteristics ==
CGDCT series typically focus on young female characters engaging in everyday activities in a cute way, often in a high school setting and with a mostly or all-female cast. The complete absence of male characters is not a cardinal rule for works of the genre as a whole, but the appearance of prominent or significant male characters in such stories, as in anime and manga like Love Lab or Blend S is considered a notable exception. The characters may have to overcome challenges like the threat of their school club being disbanded or the stress of performing in front of a crowd, but also can have conflicts which are resolved in the "happiest way possible". CGDCT manga generally lack overt sexual fan service. Although CGDCT has considerable similarities with iyashikei or slice of life, it is distinguished by its focus on the cuteness of their characters and their actions rather than the plot itself, and is often described as a subgenre of the two.

As a genre largely built on detailed relationships between, often exclusively, female characters, CGDCT often contains various homoerotic or outright lesbian content, represented by various subtext, queerbaiting or yuri fanservice, as well as full-fledged attraction and romance. In particular, one of the most famous representatives of the genre is the manga and anime YuruYuri, whose main premise is a comedic play on moe yuri tropes and pairings.

Because CGDCT can describe many different situations, it has been described as present in genres as diverse as music, comedy, action, and horror. It has also been described as present in genres such as sports, adventure, and fantasy, or are focused on topics like camping, as is the case with Laid-Back Camp.

Some, like Yuricon founder Erica Friedman, said "her crowd" refers to the subgenre as "cute girls doing cute things cutely", and focused on emotional intimacy in various slice-of-life series, such as Encouragement of Climb: Next Summit, Do It Yourself!!, A Place Further than the Universe, and Let's Make a Mug Too, which have been described by others as falling into the subgenre, along with others such as Girls' Last Tour, Asteroid in Love, and Sweetness and Lightning.

== Reception ==
Shows described as CGDCT have attained enormous popularity, with Stormie McNeal of Game Rant suggesting that the "predictability" of the genre makes it "not only feel familiar but also easy to watch regardless of [the watcher's] mood." A reviewer from Anime News Network wrote that "perhaps [no trope or genre] ha[s] garnered as controversial a reputation yet passionate a following as Cute Girls Doing Cute Things". Another reviewer, Carlo Santos, from the same site, described it as the "most maligned of comedy subgenres."

The genre's portrayal of female characters has garnered criticism, with Marina Garrow of Anime Feminist writing that the genre has been "dubbed vapid, sexist, and objectifying of women", as well as creating an overly homogenous depiction of female characters. Ana Sousa, an anime and manga scholar, argued that the genre is exploitative and creates a sense of "affective flatness or shallowness" that prevents meaningful character portrayals. Anime Feminist said the subgenre focuses on "teenage Japanese (cis) girls being cute and getting hyperfixated on a particular topic." Some writers for Anime News Network, like Zac Bertschy and Brian Hanson, asserted that producers were "trying to cash in" on the subgenre by making "pale imitations" or "empty" series, and that the series weren't anything "new and unique", but are too much like previous shows. Additional reviewers described the series within the subgenre as either "light, fluffy, and utterly aimless", cute, funny, or relaxing, or being "sweet, inconsequential fluff" with little tension within a "fairly crowded" subgenre, requiring storytelling elements to set each series apart from one another.

Other critics have taken an opposing view; Garrow opined that despite its criticisms, CGDCT played an important role in neurodivergent presentation, with female characters "allowed an astonishing level of independence, freedom to make mistakes and live their lives." Alex Henderson of Anime Feminist suggested that shows like K-On! give their protagonists independent passions and motivations, while reviewers for the same site said that it shows characters, particularly teens, living their best lives, and can "portray more authentic relationships and emotions" with care in such a way that they are interesting and relatable.

The term itself is sometimes seen as carrying negative undertones. In addition, the term has been used to criticize series as either being derivative or conventional in nature by virtue of belonging to the genre.

== See also ==
- Kawaii
- Moe (slang)
