= Saori (video game) =

1991 video game

Saori: The House of Beautiful Girls
- Developer: Fairytale X-Shitei
- Publisher: Kirara
- Platforms: PC-9801, FM Towns, X68000
- Release: October 18, 1991
- Genres: Adventure, adult, bishojo game
- Mode: Single player

Saori: The House of Beautiful Girls (沙織 -美少女達の館-, Saori: Bishōjo-tachi no Yakata) is an adult-themed adventure video game released in Japan on October 18, 1991 by FairyTale under the name X-Shitei. A controversial event related to the game resulted in the establishment of the Ethics Organization of Computer Software (EOCS).

== Gameplay ==
Saori is a first-person adventure game. The player's interaction is confined to repeatedly selecting context-specific options until the next event is triggered. In the beginning of the game the player only has access to one room. Repeatedly visiting rooms triggers new scenes and eventually unlocks other rooms.

== Plot ==
A teenage girl named Saori is abducted by a sadistic woman who locks her in a mysterious mansion. By visiting the rooms within, Saori unlocks erotic memories of its inhabitants, ultimately exposing them to the owner's cruel pleasures.

== Controversy ==
A copy of the game was stolen by a junior high school student from the Kyoto Metropolitan Area in 1991. Additionally, Japanese authorities authorized a search warrant at JAST and four other resellers in its vicinity due to the amount of graphic content in the game. This resulted in the presidents of JAST and Kirara, the latter being the owner of the FairyTale brand, being arrested by police on November 25, 1991 on charges of possession of obscene material with intent to resell. Shortly after, FairyTale recalled all copies of this game and any others that would be found at fault in the eyes of the law, and re-released them with self-censorship. The titles in question included Dragon City X-Shitei, Tenshi-tachi no Gogo 3: Bangai-hen, and Tenshi-tachi no Gogo 4: Yuko. The incident was named the "Saori Incident" (沙織事件, Saori Jiken).
