= Dan Salvato =

Video game developer and writer

- Occupations: Video game designer; programmer; writer
- Known for: Creator of Doki Doki Literature Club!
- Website: dansalvato.com

Dan Salvato is an American video game developer, programmer, and writer. He is best known as the creator and lead developer of the 2017 psychological horror visual novel Doki Doki Literature Club! and founder of the independent game development studio Team Salvato. Prior to his work on Doki Doki Literature Club!, Salvato was active in the Super Smash Bros. esports and modding communities.

== Career ==
=== Modding and esports ===
Before developing standalone video games, Salvato was a former professional Super Smash Bros. Melee player and prominent software developer within the game's competitive community. He was a key developer for Project M, a community-made total conversion mod for Super Smash Bros. Brawl. Additionally, Salvato created the 20XX Tournament Edition (20XXTE), a custom software modification for Melee designed to facilitate tournament organization and training features.

=== Team Salvato and Doki Doki Literature Club! ===
In 2017, Salvato founded Team Salvato and released his debut indie project, Doki Doki Literature Club!, as freeware on itch.io and Steam. Inspired by his "love–hate" relationship with anime tropes such as "cute girls doing cute things", Salvato designed the game to subvert player expectations by deceptively presenting itself as a conventional visual novel about an after-school club before transitioning into a psychological horror experience.

The game became a viral success and received critical acclaim for its narrative design, meta-fictional elements, and handling of heavy themes. In 2021, Salvato released an expanded version titled Doki Doki Literature Club Plus! for PC and home consoles in partnership with publisher Serenity Forge.
