= Librarian of the Year Award =

Annual award for professional librarians in North America

The Librarian of the Year Award is an annual award made by Library Journal to "honor a professional librarian for outstanding achievement and accomplishments reflecting the loftiest service goals of the library profession". It was first awarded in 1988. Although it is often referred to as the "National Librarian of the Year Award", any working professional librarian from North America is eligible.

== Past winners ==
Source: Librarian of the Year - Past Winners (Library Journal)

- 2023: Books Unbanned team, Brooklyn Public Library
- 2022: All librarians and library staff
- 2021: Elaine R. Hicks, Stacy Brody, and Sara Loree, Librarian Reserve Corps
- 2020: Christian Zabriskie and Lauren Comito, Urban Librarians Unite
- 2019: Skye Patrick, LA County Library, CA
- 2018: Lance Werner, Kent District Library, MI
- 2017: Jill Bourne, San José Public Library, CA
- 2016: Nicolle Ingui Davies, Arapahoe Library District, CO
- 2015: Siobhan A. Reardon, Free Library of Philadelphia
- 2014: Corinne Hill, Chattanooga Public Library
- 2013: Jo Budler, Kansas State Library
- 2012: Luis Herrera, San Francisco Public Library
- 2011: Nancy Pearl, University of Washington
- 2010: Craig Buthod, Louisville Free Public Library, KY
- 2009: Team Cedar Rapids, Cedar Rapids Public Library, IA
- 2008: Norma Blake, New Jersey State Librarian
- 2007: Mary Baykan, Washington County Free Library, MD
- 2006: Rivkah Sass, Omaha Public Library
- 2005: Susan K. Nutter, Vice Provost & Director of Libraries, North Carolina State University, Raleigh
- 2004: Toni Garvey, City Librarian, Phoenix Public Library
- 2003: Raymond Santiago, Director, Miami-Dade Public Library System, FL
- 2002: Susan Kent, Los Angeles Public Library, CA
- 2001: Louise Blalock, Hartford Public Library, CT
- 2000: SEE 2001. Library Journal changed the year of the award to the year in which it is presented.
- 1999: Jerry Thrasher, Cumberland County Public Library, NC
- 1998: Susan Fuller, Director, Santa Clara County Library, San Jose, CA
- 1997: Bobby Roberts, Central Arkansas Library System, Little Rock, AR
- 1996: Dorothy M. Schirtzinger, Lee County Library System, Fort Myers, FL
- 1995: Carla D. Hayden, Enoch Pratt Free Library, Baltimore, MD
- 1994: Deborah Jacobs, Corvallis-Benton County Public Library, OR
- 1993: Susan C. Curzon, Vice Provost, Information and Technology Resources Division and Dean of the University Library System, California State University, Northridge
- 1992: John W. Ferguson, Director, Mid-Continent Public Library, Independence, MO
- 1991: Daniel J. Bradbury, Director, Kansas City Public Library, Kansas City, MO
- 1990: Amy Owen, Utah State Librarian, Salt Lake City, UT
- 1989: Brenda Vogel, Library Coordinator of the Maryland Correctional Educational Libraries
- 1988: Peggy Goodwin, Adult Services Librarian, Walnut Creek Branch Library of the Nicholson Memorial Library System, Garland, TX
