= The Book Club Companion =

2006 novel

The Book Club Companion is a book by Diana Loevy published in 2006. The book focuses on book clubs, including book selection and other social aspects.
