= Budler =

Budler is a surname. Notable people with the surname include:

- Hekkie Budler (born 1988), South African boxer
- Jo Budler, American librarian
- Mitchell Budler (born 2003), American soccer player
