= Genreflecting =

Genreflecting is the process of examining and analyzing the patterns and characteristics of literary genres—both fiction and recreational nonfiction—and using that analysis to identify titles with similar appeals to readers (i.e., read-alikes), in order to make reading suggestions to individuals who are looking for something to read.

The term "genreflecting" was coined by Betty Rosenberg, a prominent library science educator, in 1982.

Since that time, the term has been adopted by readers' advisory in libraries and extended to nonfiction genres as well as fiction. A similar practice in retail bookstores is called "hand-selling."

== History ==
At the time the first edition of Rosenberg's Genreflecting was written, adding popular reading materials to library collections and recommending those titles to readers were controversial practices. Dr. Rosenberg's First Law of Reading—"Never apologize for your reading taste"—has since been adopted by growing numbers of librarians, and the field of readers' advisory has become increasingly central to the practice of librarianship.

Nancy Pearl, the well known model of the librarian action figure and author of Book Lust and More Book Lust, has promoted and further popularized the practice of readers' advisory within the library community and beyond.

In recent years, a number of online databases have been developed to assist readers' advisors find "read-alikes," including What Do I Read Next? (Gale Thomson), NoveList (EBSCO), The Reader's Advisor Online (Greenwood Publishing Group), Fiction Connection (Bowker), and Booklist Online (American Library Association).
