= Flashlite =

Flashlite or FlashLite may refer to:

- Adobe Flash Lite, a lightweight version of Adobe Flash Player
- Polyhedra FlashLite, a software product of ENEA AB
- Flashlite, a fictional magazine in The Mother-Daughter Book Club

== See also ==
- Flashlight, a portable hand-held electric light
