= Literature Circles in EFL =

Literature Circles in EFL are teacher accompanied classroom discussion groups among English as a foreign language learners, who regularly get together in class to speak about and share their ideas, and comment on others' interpretations about the previously determined section of a graded reader in English, using their 'role-sheets' and 'student journals' in collaboration with each other.

== Introduction ==
English language learners often say that reading, which is a vital element of language learning, is boring and difficult. This problematic situation might be the result of not practicing EFL reading in the right way. So, is there an effective way of using literature in the EFL classroom? The issue, this article intends to investigate is, what language interactions and classroom discourse are taking place in 'Literature Circles' and how this might affect the language development of foreign language learners? The suggested idea is that, as a balanced element of the school curriculum, literature circles can provide an exciting way to promote student engagement in extensive reading by means of cooperative learning and collaborative work and offer the potential to promote reading for enjoyment. The main focus of the analysis has been the student-to-student interactions and classroom discourse taking place during literature circles discussions. The main concern was over how different variables affect the language development of English learners. The results show that, during the process of this research, the students were highly motivated for reading and in that way improved their interactional skills in English. They experienced a different atmosphere of practicing language. They had similar tasks as they had before but this time for a more realistic purpose and in a more authentic environment.

== Overview ==
Nowadays, nearly all EFL coursebooks compete to include the most up-to-date and interesting texts for the target age group, while on the other hand the fiction literature has a treasure of themes which, relate more to our everyday lives. All this goes against what most English language learners and many English teachers as well believe: poems, short stories, and plays do not have a major role in classrooms aimed at developing communicative competence in English, and literary texts are only for advanced learners. In reality, most students often think that the study of English literature is boring and difficult. This problematic situation might be the result of not teaching literature in the right way. Most English learners think that studying literature is definitely not the right way to develop either language skills or interest into literature.

Today, most of the foreign language teachers, are in search of specific learning approaches that have strong student centered components like cooperative and collaborative learning. In this article, the term 'literature circles' in the EFL classroom refers to; small groups of students reading the same piece of literature to accomplish different tasks like preparing questions, reporting challenging vocabulary, finding cultural items, determining the well written parts or making connections with the contemporary society. The members of the groups later come together in the classroom to have a discussion under the supervision of their English teacher on the piece of literature they covered.

Being greatly influenced by the effect of these literature circles on L1 classes, a research was conducted at a high school in Sofia, Bulgaria to find out more about how teachers can increase the student interaction and adapt literature circles into EFL classes to increase foreign language competence. The main question arising from the problem at this stage was: Is there an effective way to use literature in the EFL classroom? The research also focused on how much the student interaction in an EFL class could be encouraged through literature circles.

== Background ==
The idea of 'Literature Circles in EFL' initially came from the adult 'book clubs' defined as a group of people who meet regularly to discuss the specific book they have read and share their opinions, likes or dislikes about it.

Similarly, as DaLie explains, a 'literature circle' is a students' equivalent of an adult book club in the L1 English classroom. The aim is to encourage student-choice and a love of reading in young people. According to DaLie, the true intent of Literature Circles is "to allow students to practice and develop the skills and strategies of good readers" in English as their native language.

'Literature Circles' are small groups of students who gather to discuss a piece of literature in depth. The discussion is guided by students' response to what they have read. Schlick Noe & Johnson further explain that, you may hear talks about events and characters in the book, the author's craft, or personal experiences related to the story.

As a key element of the English L1 classes in US, Daniels explains 'Literature Circles' as a form of independent reading, structured as collaborative small groups, and guided by reader-response principles in light of current comprehension research.

On the EFL side of the picture, Furr, literature circles in EFL are magic in that they have the power to transform 'Foreign Language Learners' from passive, rather shy, reticent students into students who eagerly point at their texts in order to support their arguments while sharing their opinions in English!

== Aims ==
Based on all the above-mentioned issues related to the difficulty of implementing literature in EFL classes, the initial aim with this research was to find out how literature circles stimulate the social interaction among language learners and promote the collaborative learning in the EFL classroom.

Wendy C. Kasten believes that literature circles promote peer discussions, negotiation of ideas, and the expression of comprehension, which is a feature that is most common in literature circles. As it is clear that classroom interaction and social learning will appeal to teachers and researchers who have an interest in classroom discourse, this research tends to find out more about the extent and importance of literary discourse in foreign language acquisition and the need and importance of literary texts for a comprehensive attainment of higher levels of language skills.

'Literature Circles in EFL' study can be important on the grounds that, with greater needs on improving foreign language learning and skills development for general language competency and exam preparation, there is a need for a research into the process underlying the performance and literary materials used to stimulate the student interaction in foreign language classes through collaborative work on literature circles. As Nunan states, this kind of research can provide guidance for teacher education, instructional materials, and curriculum development.

== Research ==
The main issues the research intends to investigate and expects to find out are mainly focused on the responses and findings of the following major research questions: What language interactions and classroom discourse are taking place in literature circles and how might this affect the language development of foreign language learners? The intended research further aims to discover if teaching of literature or literary texts makes language acquisition more 'use-focused' instead of 'form-focused' and if it is beneficial to include literature or literary texts in EFL curriculum at all the stages of language learning in general.

The primary research rationale suggests that, as a balanced element of the school curriculum, literature circles can provide an exciting way to promote student engagement in social interaction and improve foreign language learning by means of cooperative learning and collaborative work and offer the potential to promote reading for enjoyment.

It is suggested by Schlick Noe & Johnson that 'Literature Circles' are easy to fit into a comprehensive literacy program as a way for students to apply what they are learning about reading and writing.

== Methodology ==
Searching for a suitable research methodology for the project, Lemke's statements were found the most helpful, where he embraces a social perspective on language that sees schools not as 'knowledge delivery systems' but as social institutions in which people affect each other's lives. He argues that classroom education is talk. "It is the social use of language to enact regular activity structures and to share systems of meaning among teachers and students".

This research project mainly focuses on literature circles, which Daniels describes as a quite sophisticated and highly evolved part of the wider collaborative learning movement. Before making a distinction between cooperative and collaborative learning, we should know that, the act of learning takes place in social interactions through joint, collaborative activity. As Baquedano-López states, learning takes place first at the social level which is 'the inter-personal level' and is later appropriated by the individual one which is 'the intra-personal level'. Daniels introduces a distinction between 'cooperative learning', which is mainly used to describe traditional skills-oriented school tasks assigned by teachers to student groups, and 'collaborative learning', which is preferred for more higher-order, student-centered and open-ended activities. To find the relation between literature circles and communicative and cooperative learning, we depart from Raphael and Gavelek's view that 'literature circles' can be traced to the idea of cooperative learning study groups where students work collaboratively on specific projects or tasks. As it is also mentioned by Ernst-Slavit, Carrison, & Spiesman-Laughlin, literature circles provide opportunities for oral language and literacy growth for all students, including English language learners. Many teachers, however, are hesitant to use this instructional approach with students who are learning English.

On the one hand, it is generally difficult to make a distinction between cooperative and collaborative learning methods at the beginning. When we consider the advantages of small group structure and active student participation in collaborative and cooperative tasks over passive, lecture based teaching, the two terms seem quite close in meaning. In both ways learning is supported by a discovery based approach. Both methods require group skills and come with a framework upon which the group's activity resides, but cooperative learning is usually more structurally defined than collaborative learning.

On the other hand, experts define the differences between these methodologies as one of knowledge and power, as Rockwood explains. It can be concluded that cooperative learning is based on foundational knowledge while collaborative learning is more on the constructionist's view that knowledge is a social construct. Cooperative learning requires the instructor as the center of authority and is usually more closed-ended and usually has specific answers. In comparison, collaborative learning does not entail the instructor's authority and requires small groups which are often given more open-ended, complex tasks.

=== Participants ===
The study was conducted on two groups of students at a private high school in Sofia, Bulgaria. The first group consisted of 34 (fourteen-year-old) teenagers in eight-grade and the second group included 33 (eighteen-year-old) young adults in twelfth-grade. The aforementioned high school is an English language profile school, where eight-grade is a preparatory year with 21 hours of English language instruction weekly, starting from elementary level up to the intermediate throughout the year. In the school, starting from the ninth-grade onwards, the language of instruction for math, physics, chemistry and biology is English as well. Twelfth-grade is the graduation year, when students study intensively to get ready for university entrance exams such as, State-Graduation-Exam, TOEFL, IELTS or SAT. Because of these reasons English language is the most crucial subject for those age groups. The school has a multicultural setting as there are many students from different nationalities and family backgrounds. The class sizes are rather small with an average of 15 students per class.

=== Data collection ===
The research was planned to explain how to increase student interaction which leads to better learning of foreign languages and the way language can be integrated into the activity routines of the classroom. So the data which is necessary for the research was planned to be collected by methods of analyzing classroom interaction which involves the analysis of classroom talk during the literature circles. To achieve this, a classroom observation form for the teacher was chosen which complies with Bales' Interaction Process Analysis System (IPA). Later, the data collected was interpreted according to (IPA) system and was exposed to conceptual theoretical work which led to further relevant data collection or writing conclusions for the research.

About the choice of data collection during classroom observations, Nunan states that, although formal experiments are widely used to collect evidence on language learning and use, they are comparatively rare in genuine classrooms which have been constituted for teaching purposes, not for the purpose of data collection.

On the other hand, as Ellis describes the empirical research of L2 classrooms, he mentions that an ethnographic study of interaction would be suitable for the classroom interaction and L2 acquisition whose goal is to test a number of hypotheses relating to how interacting in the classroom contributes to L2 acquisition and to explore which types of interaction best facilitate acquisition.

Considering all this, to decide on a method for the research, a flexible qualitative method which allows greater adaptation of the interaction between the teacher and the students seemed to be the best method for class observation among such a small participant group. In this way the teacher would be able to ask more open-ended questions when necessary and the participants would be free to respond in their own words instead of just saying simply 'yes' or 'no'.

The source for the data was primarily collected via semi structured methods such as the video recordings of the literature circles, stimulated-recall sessions followed by interviews and questionnaires filled in by students and teachers notes on the discussions conducted in class. The two main variables being observed will be classroom activities like; activity type, participant organization, content, student modality and materials and classroom language like; use of target language, information gap, sustained speech, reaction to code or message, incorporation of preceding utterance, discourse initiation and relative restriction of linguistic form mentioned as the communicative orientation of language teaching by Nunan.

In addition, because of the less formal relation between the researcher and participants, they responded more elaborately and in greater detail. The researcher also had the opportunity to respond immediately to what participants said by tailoring subsequent questions with the information the participant had provided. Related to this, it is believed that by conducting a qualitative research, some new ideas and a hypothesis may be generated for a later quantitative research.

=== Data analysis ===
The main focus of the analysis was the continuous observation of communication patterns in literature circles. The main concern was over how these variables affected the language development of foreign language learners. For the analysis of the collected data, Bales' Interaction Process Analysis (IPA) system was used especially to identify and record the nature of each separate act in ongoing group interaction. IPA is devised by Bales for the continuous observation of communication patterns in interactive groups. It is mainly based on the assumption that group success depends on both how well the group can solve its tasks (task function) and how satisfied it can keep its members (socio-emotional function). Bales identified 12 interactional "moves" in four categories: (1) socio-emotional positive (shows solidarity, tension reduction, agreement); (2) socio-emotional negative (shows antagonism, tension, disagreement); (3) task-related attempted solutions (gives suggestions, opinions, orientation); and (4) task-related questions (asks for suggestions, opinions, orientation). At least one rater observes each group member, and scores occurrences of each interactional "move." This method has been used in a variety of settings, and is a reliable and useful way to analyze group interactions according to Antony S.R. Manstead.

After analyzing the classroom interaction during the reading circles according to Bales' IPA system and gathering the information from the interviews and questionnaires, it is clearly seen that literature circles stimulate the student interaction in terms of Bales' criteria in a dramatic way. This probably must have been the reason why Furr calls 'magic' to define literature circles.

=== Limitations ===
Some of the drawbacks that the research suffered from can be summarized as the limited number of students to be accessed. To provide enough detailed evidence for such a study, the number of participants was kept reasonably small. The reason for such a low number has been the fact that the participants were mainly chosen to provide an authentic classroom atmosphere to be observed and evaluated in relation to the determined criteria. The main variables observed can be listed under the 'classroom activities' and 'classroom language' headings which are explained in the methodology chapter in detail.

Another drawback has been the limited control over the instructional process and observing the learning outcomes in relation to the broadness of the issue. As the study intends to observe the student interaction in a foreign language learning environment, teacher involvement has been kept at minimum not to interfere with the authentic atmosphere of student interaction during the discussions. The meticulous observation process has also been quite difficult taking all the related criteria into consideration.

But still, considering all these drawbacks, we can say that the results reached with this study open a way for a future quantitative research over literature circles in EFL.

== Findings ==
When the first half of the school year was over, a survey was conducted which consisted of four sections. The criterion for the choice of the questionnaires was Bales' Interaction Process Analysis system. For this purpose the "Literature Circles in Action - Lesson Plans" questionnaires were found the most appropriate. The four sections of the survey each focus on a different area of the study. These include questionnaires related to: self-assessment of the participants; assessment of discussion groups; evaluation of the literature circles; and an evaluation guide for the discussion group with two open-ended questions. While evaluating the results, the averages were calculated over 40 participants' responses.

The first questionnaire was the "Self assessment of the Participants in Discussion Groups" which included ten statements. The participants preferred one of the three choices (very good, satisfactory, needs improving) to assess their performances in their discussions. The statements given are as follows:

1. I shared my ideas and offered my suggestions
2. I spoke clearly and slowly enough
3. I answered others questions
4. I remained on topic and helped the group stay focused
5. I encouraged others to participate
6. I disagreed without hurting others feelings
7. I summarized or repeated my ideas when necessary
8. I gave reasons for opinions
9. I listened courteously and effectively
10. I tried to understand and extend the suggestions of others

The results of this questionnaire gave us an overview of the self-confidence level of the participants in discussion groups. It is apparent from these results that participants feel quite self-confident especially about answering others' questions, disagreeing kindly and listening courteously and effectively. They also feel safe about keeping focused on topic, summarizing their ideas when necessary, and extending the suggestions of others. But on the other hand, it is also significant that they need to improve their skills of encouraging others to participate, giving reasons for their opinions, offering their suggestion and speaking clearly enough.

The second questionnaire was about the "Assessment of the Discussion Groups" which included five statements. The participants were asked to share their opinions (yes, no, sometimes) on these statements to assess the specific discussion group environment. The statements are as follows:

1. Everyone participates and shares in the discussion process. Communication is interactive.
2. The group is supportive of its individual members. Group climate promotes friendliness.
3. Group members often ask questions for clarification or elaboration.
4. The group discussion stays on topic, or on directly related issues.
5. The group is energetic and enthusiastic.

The results of this questionnaire gave an understanding of the effectiveness of literature circles as discussion groups. Data from this questionnaire reveals that participants believe that the group members often ask questions for clarification and the group discussion stays on topic. There is also a shared idea that the members should participate more and that they should be supportive of each other by encouraging their friends in need. What is interesting about these results is that nearly one fourth of the participants believe that the groups are not energetic and enthusiastic.

The third questionnaire was the "Literature Circles Evaluation" which gives a specific insight of the general values in literature circles. The participants chose one of the three responses (need to improve, do it, do it well) to assess the specific characteristics of the literature circles. The statements are as follows:

1. preparation work done in notebook
2. literature book at school, not at home
3. reading completed
4. ask questions to others
5. offer my own ideas
6. encourage and respect others' opinions
7. make eye contact with others
8. keep my voice at arm's length (not to disturb other participants)

The results of the third questionnaire make the participant's performance qualities clear in literature circles. From this data it is apparent that most participants are careful about the literature circle materials like the books or the journals. We also see here that, nearly all participants read their parts completely and keep eye contact with others during the discussions. In contrast, it is clear that there is an urgent need to improve students' question asking skills. Similarly the participants do not feel at ease encouraging and respecting their group members' ideas and they also agree that they should lower their voices.

The fourth questionnaire was the "Discussion Group Evaluation Form" which has two major open-ended writing tasks to find out what skills do participants believe that they are good at and most importantly, what skills do they think that are most crucial for literature circle discussions. The two open-ended writing tasks included are as follows:

1. My overall rating of myself is as follows:
2. I think the person who worked the hardest in my group is ... because:

The results of this questionnaire shows us firstly, the areas or skills that students feel most confident about and secondly what skills do they most value during the literature circle discussions.

== Conclusion ==
This study has researched a new method of using literature in teaching English as a Foreign Language (EFL) to stimulate the social interaction among language learners. A bottom up approach based on the observation of the classroom interaction and the conducting of a questionnaire survey has been presented, combining qualitative observation results with statistical information from the survey. The methods of using literature circles to practice foreign language show encouraging results for both teenagers and young adults and are efficient compared to other conventional techniques in EFL classrooms.

The main rationale for this research was to find out the benefits of using literature circles in English as a foreign language learning environments. The study has set out to determine the effects of these student reading groups on language learning as most of the foreign language learners find extensive reading boring and those classes are the most challenging ones for the teachers as well. One of the significant findings to emerge from this study was, if the literature circles help language learning through stimulation of the classroom atmosphere by having the teachers and students focus on the interaction patterns during the book discussion sessions. The suggested ideas with this research was that, the literature circles as a balanced element of the school curriculum can provide an exciting way to promote student engagement in extensive reading by means of cooperative learning and collaborative work and offer the potential to promote reading for enjoyment. The main focus of the analysis part was the contrast in interactions and classroom discourse taking place in literature circles and regular alternative extensive reading classes. The main concern was concentrated on how these variables affect the language development of English learners. The main variables observed were 'classroom activities' like, activity type, participant organization, content, student modality and materials and 'classroom language' like, the use of target language, information gaps, sustained speech, reaction to code or message, incorporation of preceding utterances, discourse initiation and relative restrictions of linguistic forms.

The results of the study presented in the findings chapter clearly show that the development of the classroom interaction assists language learning and literature circles is an effective way of bringing the classroom interaction to life. If we take the reflections of the student and the results of the observations into consideration, it is evident that the implication of literature circles is a rather different procedure compared to ordinary classroom instruction. Literature circles bring excitement and energy into the language classroom. During this study the participants enjoyed the sense of responsibility for their own learning and decided to improve their interaction skills to become better English language learners.

As for the benefits in EFL classes, it is also observed that literature circles facilitate learning by giving students an opportunity to share opinions in a specially designed classroom atmosphere, practicing situations very similar to real life experiences. I believe that the effectiveness of this method is greatly dependent on the teacher's motivation. If the teacher manages to produce a collaborative learning environment with the suitable materials, I believe that the students will be readily eager to participate and support the shared experience and knowledge created in the classroom.

One of the more significant findings to emerge from this study is that the students were motivated to reading and by this means improved their foreign language skills during the process of this research. They experienced a different atmosphere of practicing language. They did similar assignments as they did before but this time for a more realistic purpose and in a more authentic environment.

The implications of this research for the EFL teachers would be appalling as the study promotes after class extensive reading and development of discussion skills through the encouragement of interaction patterns which many teachers are after. The limitations encountered during the study were the small number of participants in a real school environment which is not appropriate for an experimental quantitative study. That is why a qualitative study was preferred to build on observations and questionnaires. But the results derived from the classroom observations and participant questionnaires provide enough background for a further study. Other disadvantages were the high number of variables to be observed and again limited control over the instructional process and observing the learning outcomes in relation to the broadness of the issue.

Although this study is based on the classroom interaction as the criteria to be observed in literature circles, future studies may focus on some other variables like the development of reading and writing skills, or even grammar and vocabulary improvement through literature circles. Moreover, by using some other research methods, the results of this study may be compared with the findings of those other studies which will use different research methods. It would increase the validity and reliability issues in the findings. In addition to these points, the research could further explore the development of materials and procedures appropriate for different purposes or levels of competency in foreign languages. This study has gathered supporting ideas related to the similar research projects. This impact will provide the language teachers to be interested in the subject more and try similar applications which will provide further evidence for future studies.

As a result, it is clear that the teachers and learners have problems regarding the usage of literary texts in EFL classes and the solution requires a new point of view on the teaching of literature both by teachers and by textbooks. The results of such a study can motivate the teachers to use the literature resources more effectively encouraging real life interaction in the classroom. For instance, in accordance with the findings of the study, it can be suggested that teaching with the help of reading texts should not be limited to only fiction literature. As well as the novels and short stories, some other texts like fact files should also be adapted for the discussion groups. Originating from the results of this study further research can be done by collecting more quantitative data on the subject. Maybe, some experimental quantitative research designs would be suitable for this purpose.

As teachers and educators, there are many questions waiting to be dealt with in front of us like, "Are there more opportunities we can provide our students with for a better learning environment?" or "What are the contemporary modals of professional teacher development?" I strongly believe that this study has put another brick on the literature circle studies in the field, contributing to the growth of this collaborative work.

== See also ==
- Interaction hypothesis
