= Readers' advisory =

Library service for book suggestion and promotion

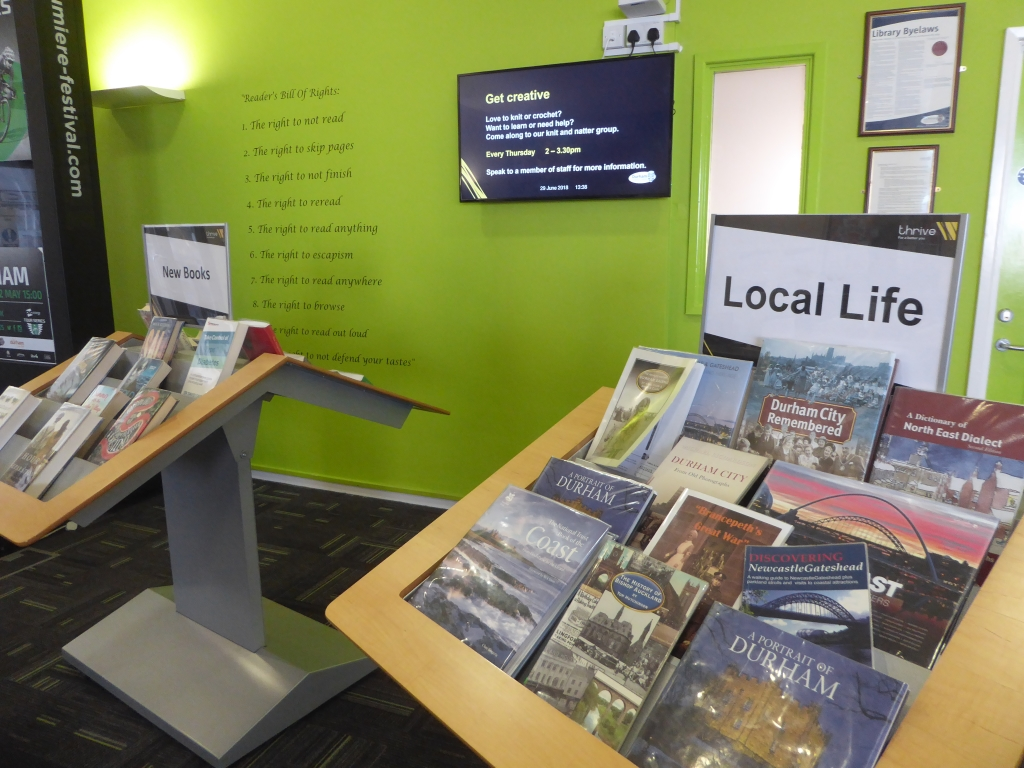
Indirect advisory book display in a library in Durham, England

Readers' advisory (sometimes spelled readers advisory or reader's advisory) is a service which involves suggesting fiction and nonfiction titles to a reader through direct or indirect means. This service is a fundamental library service; however, readers' advisory also occurs in commercial contexts such as bookstores. Currently, almost all North American public libraries offer some form of readers' advisory.

== History ==
=== North America ===
"Setting a date for the start of what we now call readers advisory service, particularly readers advisory in the public library, is at best a frustrating, almost arbitrary exercise. Efforts at historical precision can founder on such basic issues as the absence of common definitions. For example, answers to such questions as 'What exactly is a public library?" or "What really is readers advisory?" have long been disputed." (Bill Crowley, from his 2005 journal article "Rediscovering the History of Readers Advisory Service")

The historical period divisions and merits of different types of readers' advisory services is an often-debated topic among librarians.

Bill Crowley, in his 2005 article, "Rediscovering the History of Readers Advisory Service," breaks down the historical period divisions of the service into four eras:

- 1876 to 1920 – "Inventing" Readers' Advisory
- 1920 to 1940 – "Privileging Nonfiction" in Readers' Advisory
- 1940 to 1984 – Readers' Advisory "'Lost' in Adult Services"
- 1984 to 2005 (current at time of article) – "Reviving Readers' Advisory"

Juris Dilevko and Candice Magowan question the merits of the current readers' advisory emphasis on popular fiction materials in their book "Readers' Advisory Service in North American Public Libraries, 1870–2005". They subdivide the history into three eras:

- 1870 to 1916 – "The Formative Years"
- 1917 to 1962 – "The Commitment to Systematic Adult Education"
- 1963 to 2005 – "The Devolution into Entertainment"

Dilevko and Mogowan write about "readers' advisory systematically committ[ing] itself to meaningful adult education through serious and purposeful reading" up until the 1960s, when emphasis on "popular culture resulted in the 'Give 'Em What They Want' approach" and "The Devolution into Entertainment."

==== 1897–1920 ====
In 1897, the American Library Association President stated that "the personal influence of librarians who assisted and advised readers was the most potent force in molding community reading."

==== 1920–1980 ====
Organized readers' advisory programs have been documented dating back to the 1920s. Between 1922 and 1926, readers' advisory programs were experimentally introduced into seven urban libraries (Cleveland and Detroit, in 1922, Indianapolis, Milwaukee, and Chicago, in 1923 and 1924, and Cincinnati and Portland, OR).

The Adult Education Movement emerged in the 1920s in public libraries and was frequently discussed in American Library Association professional publications.

The 1924 report The American Public Library and the Diffusion of Knowledge by William Learned to the Carnegie Corporation sought to establish adult education as the focus of the public library, with personalized readers' advisory service to adult readers by "reference experts" who would make up a "community intelligence service."

The 1926 American Library Association commission report Libraries and Adult Education placed high importance on readers' advisory services in Adult Education. Judson T. Jennings provided a summary of the work, observing that the "library's contribution to adult education resolved itself into three major activities:"

1. Service regarding local opportunities for adult students.
2. Service to other agencies engaged in adult education.
3. Service to individual readers and students.

This new professional interest during the 1920s spurred the creation of specialized full-time readers' advisory positions in major public libraries. By 1936, an estimated, 50 public libraries had established readers' advisory services.

Until the early 1960s, readers' advisory focused on non-fiction materials and continuing adult education.

==== 1980s–2000s ====
Some librarians consider the early 1980s to be the beginning of a revival in readers' advisory and rise in the inclusion of fiction, noting write that readers' advisory was historically biased in favor of nonfiction.

Others disapproved of the new approaches to the service. Dilevko and Magowan write that "post-1980 readers' advisory thus became an opportunity to converse with patrons about 'light, quick, escapist' books -- popular and ephemeral fiction and nonfiction for entertainment, pleasure, and recreation -- because such conversations were not 'too burdensome'."

In 1982, the term "genreflecting" was first coined by Betty Rosenberg, who authored Genreflecting: A Guide to Reading Interests in Genre Fiction (Libraries Unlimited, 1982).

Another major influence on the spread and revival of readers' advisory was the Adult Reading Round Table (ARRT), founded by a group of Chicago public librarians in 1984. The group organized workshops, seminars, and genre-study groups.

==== 2000s– ====
Libraries Unlimited's Genreflecting Advisory Series has grown to 32 titles as of 2025. Beyond traditional genres (fantasy, mystery, romance), some of the diverse offerings now include guides to LGBT literature, guides to graphic novels (comic books, manga, etc.), and Christian fiction.

". . . contemporary readers advisory service is best understood as an organized program promoting both fiction and nonfiction discretionary reading for the dual purposes of satisfying reader needs and advancing a culture's goal of a literate population." (Bill Crowley, from his 2005 journal article "Rediscovering the History of Readers Advisory Service")

== Types ==
=== Direct readers' advisory ===
Direct readers' advisory is based on a non-judgmental assessment of the personal preferences of the reader through a series of questions, called a readers' advisory conversation. The assessment focuses on reader likes and dislikes with regard to a number of factors, including subject, reading level, genre, writing style, the level of characterization, plot elements, storyline, pace, tone, frame, and setting. The hoped-for outcome of this interview is the identification of three or more appropriate suggestions (sometimes referred to as "readalikes"—especially when the interview was initiated by patron interest in new authors or titles similar to one enjoyed in the past). In identifying suitable suggestions, a readers' advisor combines personal knowledge of material with a variety of specialized print and online resources to come up with appropriate suggestions.

The readers' advisor might ask the reader to describe a book they have previously enjoyed. The focus of the conversation is not on specific plots, but on the appeal elements (i.e. pace, subject, tone, writing style, etc.). Once the appeal elements have been identified, the readers' advisor will suggest appropriate titles in the collection by drawing on personal knowledge and consulting appropriate print and online resources. A skilled readers' advisor will often offer a suggestion or two that point the reader outside of a mentioned genre.

Readers' advisory can be performed across media. For example, a patron who likes a certain movie might be unaware that it is based on a book they can read, and patrons who enjoy audio books may be introduced to other titles read by the same person.

=== Indirect readers' advisory ===
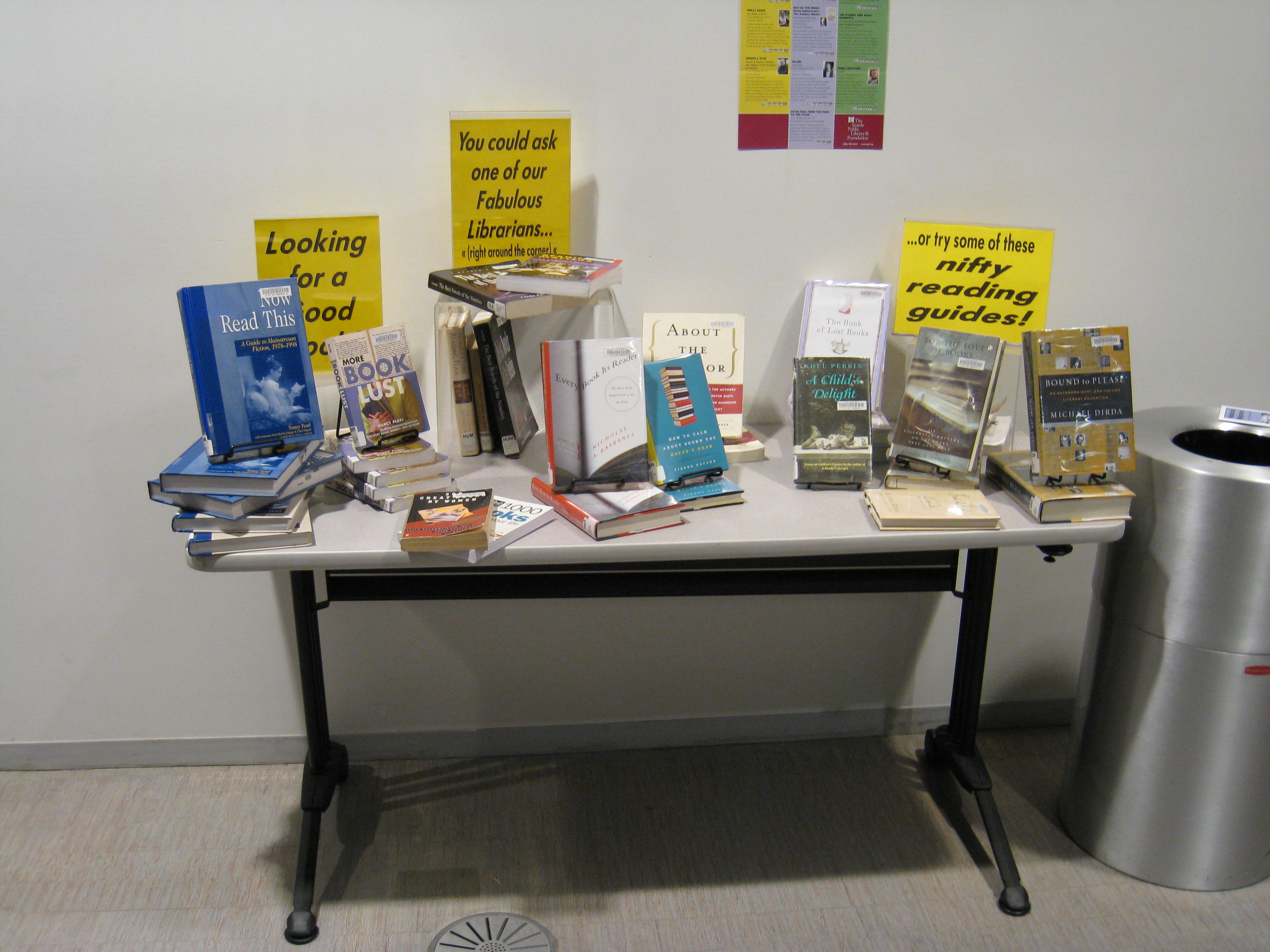
Indirect readers' advisory display: "Looking for a good book? . . . You could ask one of our Fabulous Librarians . . . or try some of these nifty reading guides"

Indirect readers' advisory involves the creation of displays, bookmarks, and annotated book lists that a reader can peruse on their own without actively engaging a readers' advisor. Indirect readers' advisory aids, particularly annotated book lists, focus on appeal elements rather than providing extensive plot summaries. Some public libraries have implemented form-based readers' advisory, which allows for a richer indirect readers' advisory experience.

Maintaining a Staff Recommendations display is another way to improve a library's readers' advisory service. Since many readers are browsers, staff recommendations make it easier to select a book.

In their 2001 article "Reader's Advisory: Matching Mood and Material," Ross and Chelton recommend placing books at the entrance, the ends of stacks, high traffic areas, and the circulation desk.

== Readers' advisory resources ==
=== Print ===
Popular print resources include the What Do I Read Next? series of reference books (published by Gale), the Genreflecting series (published by Libraries Unlimited), and the Readers' Advisory Guides (published by the American Library Association). Seattle librarian Nancy Pearl achieved broad recognition for her reader's guides, Book Lust and More Book Lust. She also wrote guides to contemporary fiction: Now Read This: A Guide to Mainstream Fiction, 1978–1998 and Now Read This II: A Guide to Mainstream Fiction, 1990–2001.

BookPage is a periodical available at many public libraries, containing book reviews, recommended reading lists, and author interviews.

=== Internet resources ===
- Booklist is a magazine by the ALA providing reviews and recommendations.
- NoveList is a database of reading recommendations, available through libraries around the world. It includes read-alikes, expert recommendations, recommended reads lists, professional reviews, feature articles, author bios, and complete series information.
  - NextReads is an email newsletter service from NoveList that offers 20 themed book recommendation newsletters to readers.
- BookBrowse offers a customized subscription service for libraries. Its readers' advisory database includes read-alikes, browsing by themes, reviews, previews, back-stories, book club advice, author bios, interviews, pronunciation guides, and e-zines.
- The American Library Association compiles different reading lists for all ages.
- LibraryReads is a monthly staff-picks list of ten newly published titles, as nominated and voted on by public library workers from around the United States.
  - Similar services in other countries include Loan Stars list in Canada, and the Librarians Choice list in Australia.
- LibraryThing is a social networking website for cataloging and sharing personal and institutional library collections. The site contains a "BookSuggester" feature which provides book recommendations based on user catalogs with similar books.
- Wowbrary is a weekly email newsletter showing new books, movies, and music selected by the user's local library in the previous week.
- What's Next is the Kent District Library's database for series fiction.
- Whichbook is a site where users search by story characteristics using sliders. The results can be limited by specific formats.
- Fantastic Fiction is a book information website that maintains bibliographies for over 60,000 authors.
- Goodreads is the world's largest site for book recommendations. Users can join groups, track books, and receive book recommendations (both automated and from friends). Goodreads launched in January 2007 and was acquired by Amazon in 2013.
- What Should I Read Next is a readers' advisory website where a reader can type in a book or author they enjoy and get recommendations of similar books.
- Literature Map is a website which offers read-alike author suggestions.
- Better Reading is a book recommendation website for Australian readers. The site focuses on helping people discover new books and authors.
- The ALA's Public Library Association has a page of professional tools for readers' advisory.

==== Blogs ====
Many librarians and libraries maintain readers' advisory blogs.

- The Book Adept is a blog written by readers' advisory professor consultant Melissa Elliott. It includes reviews of a variety of fiction for adults and young adults, often with advisory-related commentary.
- RA for All is a blog aiming to help library workers provide readers' advisory services.
- Reading Rants is a booklist for teens written by middle school librarian Jennifer Hubert Swan and designed by Andrew Mutch. The blog stopped posting in November 2023, and in February 2024 moved its activity to an Instagram page.
- School Library Journal runs several blogs.
- The Open Book is a blog by Lee & Low Books that focuses on race, diversity, education, and children's books.
- The Hub is a blog hosted by the Young Adult Library Services Association that provides collections related to teen literature.
- No Flying No Tights is a graphic novel review website.

==== Defunct ====
- Fiction_L was the Morton Grove Public Library's electronic mailing list for readers' advisory discussions, developed by Roberta S. Johnson and the reader's services staff of the library. As of June 2016, Fiction_L was managed by Cuyahoga County Public Library.
- BookSpot.com was a resource that directed users to audiobooks, free first chapters, and specific lists such as award winners and bestsellers.
- eBook Pundit was a website that helped readers find top books on topics in different fields and helped self-published authors market their books.
- Some libraries have developed readers' advisory websites based on specific titles, series, or authors, like the Allen County Public Library's "Lemony Snicket Read-Alikes and Supplements" page which provided annotated book lists based around different genre and stylistic aspects of the series.
- EarlyWord was a blog that includes reading lists as well as links to news on upcoming releases and reviews. In July 2017, EarlyWord ceased blogging on a regular basis other than promoting its "Galley Chats," monthly Twitter discussions about new and upcoming books for adults and young adults, as well as other occasional posts.
- ReadMe
- Book Lust
- Readers' Advisory Services

== See also ==
- Book discussion club
- Book talk
- Literature circle
- Genreflecting

== Publications ==
=== Adults ===
- Genreflecting: A Guide to Popular Reading Interests. 6th ed. Herald, Diana Tixier and Wayne Wiegand. Englewood, CO: Libraries Unlimited, 2005.
- Reading Matters and Reading Still Matters. By Catherine Sheldrick Ross and others. Libraries Unlimited, 2006, 2018. ISBN 1-59158-066-8.
- Readers' Advisory Services in the Public Library Joyce G. Saricks American Library Association, 3rd ed.
- "Recommended Readers' Advisory Tools.” Reference & User Services Quarterly. 43.4 (2004):294–305. 4 April 2005.
- Reader's Advisory Service in North America Public Libraries 1870–2005: A History and Critical Analysis by Juris Dilevko, Candice F.C. Magowan. McFarland, 2007.
- The Readers' Advisory Guide to Nonfiction, by Neal Wyatt. Chicago: ALA editions, 2007.
- Non-Fiction Readers' Advisory. Robert Burgin, ed. Westport, CT: Libraries Unlimited, 2004.
- The Reader's Advisor's Companion. Kenneth D. Shearer & Robert Burgin. Westport, CT: Libraries Unlimited, 2001.

=== Children and Young Adults ===
- Best Books for Children : Preschool Through Grade 6, by Catherine Barr. 8th ed. Westport, CT: Libraries Unlimited, 2006.
- Best Books for High School Readers : Grades 9–12 / John T. Gillespie, Catherine Barr. Westport, CT: Libraries Unlimited, 2004.
- Best Books for Middle School and Junior High Readers: Grades 6–9, by John T. Gillespie and Catherine Barr. Westport, CT: Libraries Unlimited, 2004.
- Best Books for Middle School and Junior High Readers: Grades 6–9, Supplement to the First Edition by John T. Gillespie and Catherine Barr. Westport, CT: Libraries Unlimited, 2006.
- Best Books for Young Adults, Young Adult Library Services Association (YALSA).
- Beyond Picture Books: Subject Access to Best Books for Beginning Readers, by Barbara Barstow, Judith Riggle, and Leslie Molnar. 3rd ed. Westport, CT: Libraries Unlimited, 2008.
- Outstanding Books for the College Bound, Young Adult Library Services Association (YALSA). Chicago: ALA, 2011.
- Naked Reading: Uncovering What Tweens Need to Become Lifelong Readers, by Teri S. Lesesne. Portland, Me. : Stenhouse Publishers, 2006.
- "Newbery Medal and Honor Books, 1922–Present". Chicago: ALA. (Revised annually)
- "Caldecott Medal & Honor Books, 1938–Present". Chicago: ALA. (Revised annually)
- Serving Teens through Readers' Advisory, by Heather Booth. American Library Association, 2007.

=== Older Adults ===
- Ahlvers, A. (2006). "Older Adults and Readers' Advisory. Reference & User Services Quarterly, 45(4), 305–312.
