= Book review =

Form of literary criticism

A book review as a research technique refers to the critical analysis and evaluation of a published work to assess its content, purpose, relevance, and contribution to a particular field of study. Books can be reviewed for printed periodicals, magazines, and newspapers, as school work, or for book websites on the Internet. A book review's length may vary from a single paragraph to a substantial essay. Such a review may evaluate the book based on personal taste. Reviewers may use the occasion of a book review for an extended essay that can be closely or loosely related to the subject of the book, or to promulgate their ideas on the topic of a fiction or non-fiction work. Beyond their function as literary commentary, book reviews are recognized in information science for providing descriptive depth that exceeds standard bibliographic records. In digital library systems, the integration of book review content into discovery layers supports resource identification and improves search accuracy by bridging formal classification with user-centered language.

Some journals are devoted to book reviews, and reviews are indexed in databases such as the Book Review Index and Kirkus Reviews; but many more book reviews can be found in newspaper and scholarly databases such as Arts and Humanities Citation Index, Social Sciences Citation Index, and discipline-specific databases.

== History ==
Photios I of Constantinople has been called "the inventor of the book review" for his work, Bibliotheca.

== Preservation ==
Historical book reviews, particularly those in 19th and early 20th-century newsprint, require specialized environmental management due to their fragile physical media. These materials are highly susceptible to acidic hydrolysis and lignin oxidation, which cause paper to become brittle. Archival standards for such documents recommend maintaining a stable temperature below 18°C (64°F) and relative humidity between 35% and 45% to slow chemical degradation and ensure long-term accessibility of the historical record. Native digital book reviews, on the other hand, face the risk of outdated formats and invalid links. To mitigate the risk of information loss, digital libraries and archives implement strategies such as data migration and the assignment of persistent identifiers (PIDs). These technical measures ensure that permanent links between book reviews and their corresponding scholarly works remain functional regardless of changes to hosting platforms or web infrastructure.

== Types of reviews ==
=== Academic reviews ===
Academic book reviews are both a form of academic service and a contribution to the academic literature. They are frequently published as a section or part of academic journals. They help the profession understand what has been happening in their profession, and work on the emerging intellectual challenges of their field. However, not all academics are incentivized to take on the work required in a book review, because they are often not rewarded for that work. Book reviews can be used to predict which monographs are likely to have subsequent citations. Beyond their critical role in scholarly discourse, these reviews are increasingly integrated as functional components of academic communication data. Metadata standards like Schema.org enable reviews to be structured as independent entities that are semantically linked to the original reviewed work or reviewer. The implementation of these linked data standards facilitates the discoverability of scholarly monographs within citation indexes and institutional knowledge bases, ensuring that critical reviews are effectively cross-referenced across global research infrastructures.

=== Newspaper and magazine reviews ===
Newspaper reviews became prominent in the 18th century, as a form of reader responses. They were common throughout the 19th and 20th century. However, the decline of newspapers began in the 21st century, and book reviews have suffered along with other newspaper sections. The Associated Press (a service many newspapers subscribe to that produces articles shared among all of them) announced it would no longer be producing book reviews in 2025, although they would still publish stories about current events that intersect with major books.

In academic criticism, popular book reviews in newspapers and magazine reviews are often used to evaluate the relative audience and impact of books during a period. In addition to their role in academic exchanges, book reviews also serve as quality indicators for the development of library collections. Academic librarians utilize the evaluative content of book reviews to make informed decisions regarding the purchase and elimination of old monographs. Furthermore, systematic analysis of book reviews is increasingly being employed in bibliometrics to assess the influence and acceptance of academic works within a specific discipline.

== See also ==
- Australian Book Review
- BookBrowse
- Booklist
- The Book Club Bible
- Claremont Review of Books
- Kirkus Reviews
- Library Journal
- Literary criticism
- London Review of Books
- National Book Critics Circle
- The New York Review of Books
- Publishers Weekly
- Self-Publishing Review
- Shelf Awareness
