= Rubber chicken =

Prop used in stand-up comedy

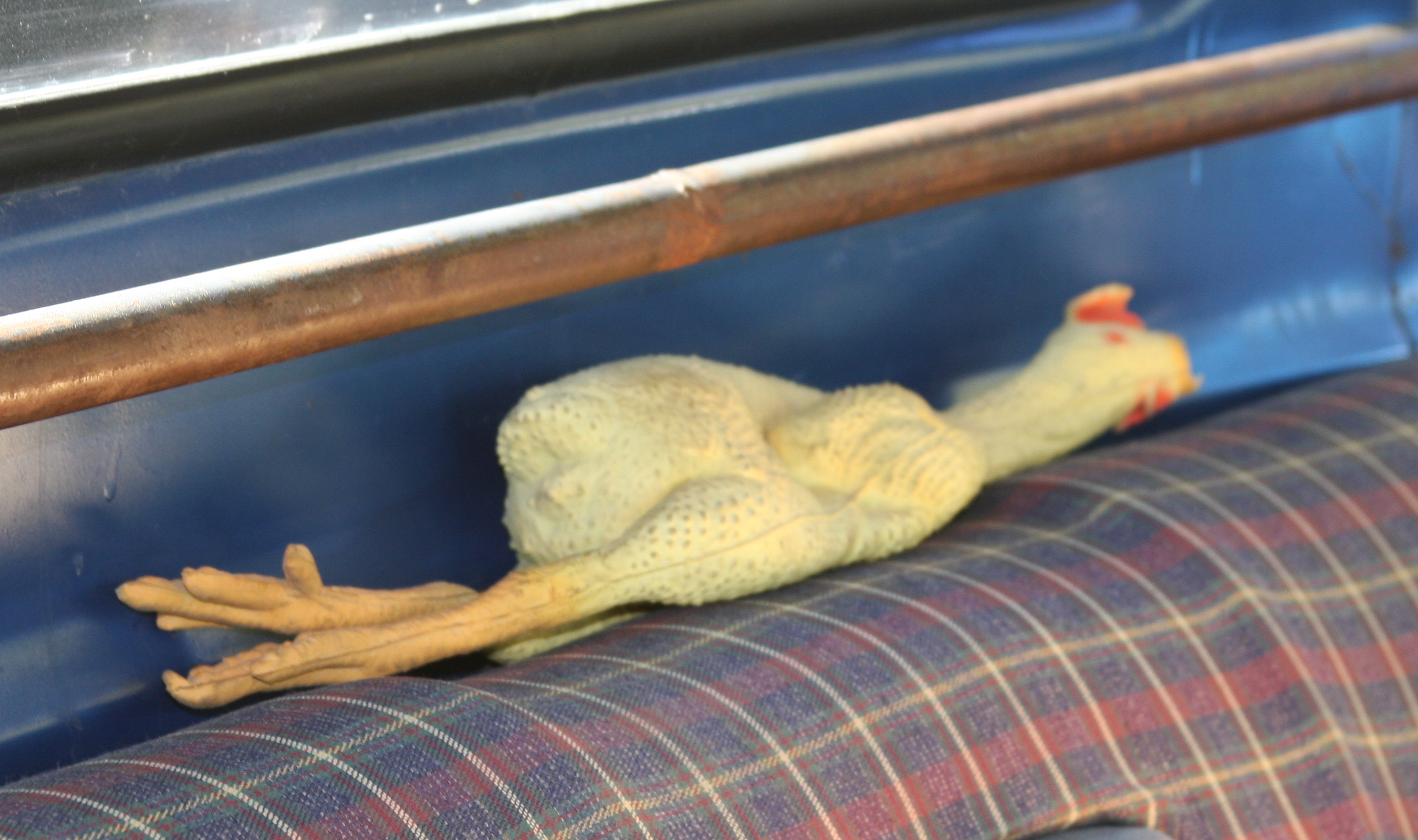
Rubber chicken in the back of a truck

A rubber chicken is a prop used in comedy. The phrase is also used as a description for food served at speeches, conventions, and other large meetings, and as a metaphor for speechmaking.

== Description ==
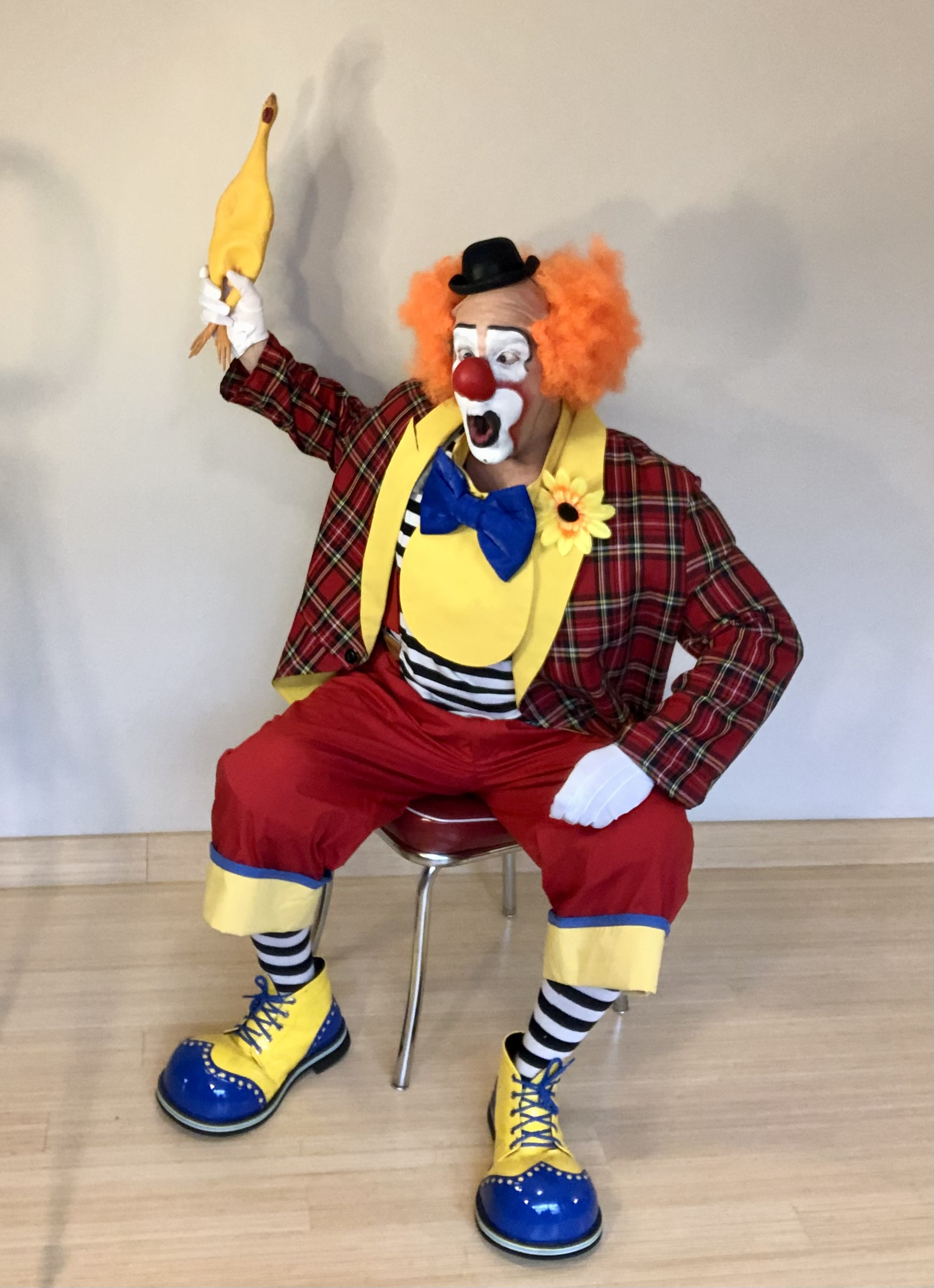
A rubber chicken is sometimes used as a prop in clown acts

A rubber chicken is an imitation plucked fowl made in a latex injection mold. Modern day rubber chickens usually have some sort of squeaking device similar to one found in a rubber duck, allowing the chicken to squeak or scream when squeezed.

== Origins ==
The origin of the rubber chicken is obscure, but it is possibly based on the use of inflated pig bladders attached to sticks and used as props or mock weapons by jesters in the days before the development of plastic and latex. Chicken corpses were readily available; therefore jesters could employ them as variations of slapsticks.

British performer Joseph Grimaldi would perform with his pockets full of fake food to mock the gluttony reportedly prevalent among the upper classes at the time. However, this predates the vulcanization of rubber.

A claim that the symbol originated during the French Revolution, with soldiers hanging a chicken from their muskets for luck, is printed on the tag of rubber chickens manufactured by Archie McPhee.

== Food and speechmaking ==
The term "rubber chicken" is used disparagingly to describe the food served at political or corporate events, weddings, and other gatherings where there are a large number of guests who require serving in a short timeframe. Often, pre-cooked chicken is held at serving temperature for some time and then dressed with a sauce as it is served. Consequently, the meat may be tough or "rubbery". Someone who "travels the 'rubber chicken circuit'" is said to do so by attending or making speeches at many such gatherings, often as part of political campaigning.
