= Book discussion club =

Group that meets to discuss read books

A book discussion club is a group of people who meet to discuss books they have read. It is often simply called a book club, a term that may cause confusion with a book sales club. Other terms include reading group, book group, and book discussion group. Book discussion clubs may meet in private homes, libraries, bookstores, online forums, pubs, and cafés, or restaurants, sometimes over meals or drinks.

A practice also associated with book discussion, common reading program or common read, involves institutions encouraging their members to discuss select books in group settings; common reading programs are often organized by educational institutions.

== History ==
Though women had formed Bible study groups since the 17th century, it was not until the late 18th century that secular reading circles emerged in both America and Europe. Reading circles for women were not limited to particular races or classes, with one of the first reading groups for black women being formed in Lynn, Massachusetts, in 1827. Throughout the 19th century, women’s reading circles expanded, with some becoming outspoken on social issues such as abolition—foreshadowing the club movement of the end of that century. Well into the 20th century, book clubs continued to serve as both an intellectual outlet and a radical political tool.

In the first half of the 20th century, women continued to be barred from many top universities. This time period was the heyday of the Book of the Month Club and the Great Books movement, both of which encouraged average Americans to take on hefty literary novels.

Women’s chief role in founding the modern book club—a consequence of being marginalized from other intellectual spaces—has gone on to influence the book industry, with women accounting for 80 percent of fiction sales. Author Toni Morrison called the 1996 launch of the Oprah's Book Club the beginning of a "reading revolution"; in its first three years, books Oprah chose averaged sales of 1.4 million copies each.

Sociologist Christy Craig said that women have turned to book clubs to construct social networks and important partnerships, especially in times of upheaval.

A 2018 BookBrowse survey found that 88% of private book clubs are all-women groups, but almost half of public groups—such as those hosted by libraries—include men. The survey found that 70% of book clubs primarily read fiction, though 93% read nonfiction at least occasionally.

== Single-title clubs ==
A single-title club is one in which people discuss a particular title that every person in the group has read at the same time, often with each member buying a personal copy. Clearly, the club must somehow decide ahead of time what that title will be. Some groups may decide to choose new release titles, whilst others may choose older ones, or a mixture of the two. If it is a book discussion club that meets at a library, then each member may borrow a copy of the book from the library over a given timeframe in order for a later discussion.

There may be a few problems with these clubs. Some members may regard them as opportunities to meet people for social contact and general conversation, partially veering off onto a wide variety of non-literary topics, while others wish to engage in serious literary analysis focused on the book in question and related works, with little non-literary interaction. Additionally, some members may suggest a book not because they are interested in it from a literary point-of-view but because they think it will offer them an opportunity to make points of personal interest to them or fit an external agenda. Also, different expectations and education/skill levels may lead to conflicts and disappointments in clubs of this kind.

== Multi-title clubs ==
The characteristics of a multi-title club are such that each member may be reading different titles from each other at any given time, and they may share a reading list for a period of time. What distinguishes this from any group of unrelated people reading different things from each other is that each title is expected to be read by the next member in a serial fashion.

=== Open loans ===
Open loans suggest that the books in question are free to be loaned among the population with the expectation of getting them back eventually. Instead of one member deciding what everyone will read, with all the cost implications of acquiring that title, these clubs usually involve circulating books they already own. Each book is introduced with a short precis. This offers members the advantage of previewing a work before committing to read. It has the effect of narrowing the focus of the dialogue so that book and reader are more quickly and more accurately matched up. The sequential nature of the process implies that within a short time, three to five people may have read the same title, which is the perfect amount for a worthy conversation.

=== Catch and release ===
Catch and release imply that actual ownership of the book transfers each iteration with no expectation of the book returning to the original owner. The mechanism of transfer may include a personal face to face hand off, sending the items through the mail, or most remarkably, leaving the book in a public place with the expectation that unknown future readers will find it there. All three methods are utilized with BookCrossing. Participants use a website and a system of unique identification numbers to track released items as they migrate through a worldwide community. The interaction is largely web-centric, but it does not exclude face-to-face gatherings, each of which can take on the traits of other book discussion clubs.

== Library book clubs ==
Many public libraries lead book clubs as a library program on a regular basis. A librarian usually leads a discussion after participants read the book. Copies of the book are available to be checked out for the group meeting. Some libraries at secondary schools and tertiary education institutions form book clubs. For book discussion groups outside of the facility, some libraries offer book discussion kits where several titles of a book are able to be loaned to a single patron, with a lending period typically longer than normal. The kits also contain suggested reading guides with discussion questions.

Librarians can aid in the procurement of items needed for private book club meetings. They are able to reserve multiple copies of a publication and extend loan periods. They are also able to facilitate club meetings digitally, through discussion boards or video meetings. Librarians have noted the positive influence of Google+ hangouts and Skype to host meetings for long-distance club members and for times in which not all members can attend the club. Librarians have also helped non-traditional book clubs find footing within their communities.

== Online clubs ==
Online book clubs exist in the shape of Internet forums, Yahoo Groups, e-mail mailing lists, dedicated websites, and even telephone conference calls. Also, in the category of social networks, these online clubs are made up of members of a variety of reading interests and often approach book discussion in different ways, e.g. academic discussion, pleasure-reading discussion, personal connection, and reaction to books members read.

Online book discussions can contain several different approaches that may differ from traditional book club discussion groups. While online clubs may opt for a face-to-face chat, others may choose to host a discussion forum where the book can be examined as the book is read. When opting for virtual meetings, book discussion groups may use tools such as Discord, Zoom, Google Meet, or other online conference sites. If the book discussion is held in forum format, social media platforms may be used, as well Discord servers or websites specifically made for book discussions.

Popular online book discussion clubs include:

- Reese's Book Club
- Between Two Books
- Belletrist
- Silent Book Club

== Author led clubs ==
In 2012, a new book club format referred to as author-led book clubs was introduced by Business Book Club "12 Books." Author led book clubs include the author of the current book as part of the discussion; it often concludes the discussion with a live conference call or webinar.

== Broadcast clubs ==
A broadcast club is one in which a television, radio, or podcast show features a regular segment that presents a discussion of a book. The segment is announced in advance so that viewers or listeners may read the book prior to the broadcast discussion. Some notable broadcast book discussion clubs include:

- "Oprah's Book Club", a segment of the American television show The Oprah Winfrey Show hosted by Oprah Winfrey
- "Good Morning America Book Club", a segment of ABC's American television show Good Morning America
- "Read with Jenna Book Club", a segment of NBC's American television show The Today Show hosted by Jenna Bush Hager
- "Book Club of the Air", a segment of NPR's American radio show Talk of the Nation hosted by Ray Suarez
- "Despierta Leyendo (Wake Up Reading)", a segment of Univision's American Spanish-language television show ¡Despierta América! (Wake Up America) hosted by Jorge Ramos
- "Richard & Judy Book Club", a segment of Channel 4's British television show Richard & Judy hosted by Richard Madeley and Judy Finnigan
- Bookclub, a British radio show on the BBC Radio 4 station hosted by James Naughtie
- First Tuesday Book Club, an Australian television show on the Australian Broadcasting Corporation network hosted by Jennifer Byrne
- "Jonny's Book Club", a segment of the weekly podcast Gay Pimpin' with Jonny McGovern hosted by Jonny McGovern
- "Chapter by Chapter", a Youtube Playlist by a Podcast host Vishwajeet M. Upadhye

== Book reading clubs ==
Given the busy lifestyles of today, another variation on the traditional 'book club' is the book reading club. In such a club, the group agrees on a specific book, and each week (or whatever frequency), one person in the group reads the book out loud while the rest of the group listens. The group can either allow interruptions for comments and questions from the members at any time, or agree to allow such input at chapter or section endings. Such a club makes reading a shared experience and frees the busy members from the "homework" of having read the book before coming to the club. It also creates a lively environment for commenting on the specifics of the books as it is read and can lead to very enriching exchanges. A given book may continue for several sittings, depending on the pace of reading, frequency of meetings, and the extent of comments and discussion. Members can take turns reading to share the reading responsibility. Another variation on the concept could be jointly listening to an audio-book with pauses for comments. Once a book is completed, members recommend their choices of the new books and vote on which book to proceed with next.

== Book discussion clubs in fiction ==
=== Literature ===
- Xingu (1916) a short story by Edith Wharton
- The Stepford Wives (1972) a novel by Ira Levin
- "...And Ladies of the Club" (1982) a novel by Helen Hooven Santmyer
- The Book Class (1984) a novel by Louis Auchincloss
- Bloodhounds (1996) a novel by Peter Lovesey
- Coast Road (1998) a novel by Barbara Delinsky
- The Book Borrower (1999) a novel by Alice Mattison
- The Book Club (1999) a novel by Mary Alice Monroe
- The Dead of Midnight (2001) a novel by Catherine Hunter
- The Used Women's Book Club (2003) a novel by Paul Bryers
- Vinyl Cafe Diaries (2003) a novel by Stuart McLean
- The Reading Group (2003) a novel by Elizabeth Noble
- Little Children (2004) a novel by Tom Perrotta
- The Jane Austen Book Club (2004) a novel by Karen Joy Fowler
- The Mother-Daughter Book Club (2007) the first book of a series by Heather Vogel Frederick
- The Guernsey Literary and Potato Peel Pie Society (2008) ISBN 978-0-385-34099-1 a novel by Mary Ann Shaffer and Annie Barrows

=== Films ===
- Scent of Love, a 2003 South Korean adaptation of the novel by Kim Ha-in directed by Lee Jeong-wook
- Little Children, a 2006 adaptation of Perrotta's novel directed by Todd Field
- The Jane Austen Book Club, a 2007 adaptation of Fowler's novel directed by Robin Swicord
- Book Club, a 2018 romantic comedy directed by Bill Holderman
- The Guernsey Literary and Potato Peel Pie Society, a 2018 adaptation of the novel directed by Mike Newell

=== Television ===
- "The Couch", a 1994 episode (season 6, number 5) of the American situation comedy Seinfeld
- "Books", a 2001 episode (season 1, number 2) of the British situation comedy The Savages
- The Book Group, a 2001–2002 British situation comedy series
- "Wedding Balls", a 2002 episode (season 4, number 22) of the American situation comedy Will & Grace
- "About a Book Club", a 2003 episode (season 1, number 5) of the American situation comedy Hope & Faith
- "The Book Club", a 2004 episode (season 1, number 4) of the American children's series Unfabulous
- "The Book of Love", a 2004 episode (season 5, number 12) of the British situation comedy My Family
- "Breaking Out Is Hard to Do", a 2005 episode (season 4, number 9) of the American animated series Family Guy
- "A Tale of Two Cities", a 2006 episode (season 3, number 1) of the American drama series Lost

=== Video games ===
- Doki Doki Literature Club, a 2017 visual novel about a high school book discussion club

=== Theater ===
- The Book Club Play, a 2008 play by Karen Zacarías

== See also ==
- The Book Club Bible
- Literature Circles
- Readers' advisory
- Literature Circles in EFL
- Shared reading
