= Literature circle =

Structured book club for young people

A literature circle, or literature club, is equivalent for young people of an adult book club, but with greater structure, expectation and rigor. The aim is to encourage thoughtful discussion and a love of reading in young people. The intent of literature circles is "to allow students to practice and develop the skills and strategies of good readers" (DaLie, 2001).

== Background of literature circles ==
Literature circles were first implemented in 1982 by Karen Smith, an elementary school teacher in Phoenix, Arizona. Handed a box of odd-and-end novels by a fellow teacher, Karen took them and promptly forgot about them. Later that year, some of her fifth grade students expressed an interest in reading them, organized themselves loosely into groups, and started to discuss the novels. Smith was surprised at the degree of their engagement with the books and the complexity of their discussions; they had no outside help or instruction from their teacher (Daniels, 1994).

Literature circles evolved into reading, study, and discussion groups based around different groupings of students reading a variety of different novels. They differ from traditional English instruction where students in classroom all read one "core" novel, often looking to the teacher for the answers and the meaning and literary analysis of the text. They highlight discussion, student response, free choice, and collaboration, "providing a way for students to engage in critical thinking and reflection" (Schlick Noe, 2004).

Well-run literature circles highlight student choice; occur over an extended period of time as part of a balanced literacy program; involve numerous structured and unstructured opportunities for student response and interpretation; and incorporate assessment and evaluation that includes self-assessment and numerous extension projects. Research on literature circles is conducted primarily by Harvey Daniels (1994, 2002, 2004), Katherine L. Schlick Noe (1995, 1999, 2001, 2003), Bonnie Campbell Hill (1995, 2001, 2003), and Nancy J. Johnson (1995, 1999, 2001); they are credited with most of the research and teacher resources around this approach to student choice and reading; however, numerous other researchers, including Kathy Short and Kathryn Mitchell Pierce (1990), Jerome Harste, Kathy Short and Carolyn Burke (1988), Katherine Samway (1991), Suzi Keegan and Karen Shrake (1991) have conducted research and classroom-based studies.

This approach to reading and learning looks to some of the best practices and theory from collaborative learning and instructional scaffolding theory. Reader-response criticism, independent reading, and student-centered learning comprise most of the theoretical underpinning of literature circles.

Literature circles are not to be confused with book discussion clubs, currently popular in some circles. While both book clubs and literature circles focus on discussion of books in small group settings, book clubs have a more loosely structured agenda for discussions and are not usually tied into literary analysis such as thematic or symbolic analysis. Furthermore, literature circles are the domain of the classroom, both at the elementary and secondary level, and involve various types of assessment (including self-assessment, observations and conferences) and evaluation (portfolios, projects and student artifacts) by both the teacher and the student. They can be used at all grade and ability levels. Furthermore, current research indicates that peer collaboration has a positive effect on student learning and performance in Language Arts (Fall et al., 2000), increases student learning, and also improves reading comprehension and content-knowledge (Klinger, Vaugn and Schumm, 1998, cited in Daniels, 2002).

== Description ==
The following table is from: Schlick Noe, K.L. & Johnson, N.J. (1999). Getting Started with Literature Circles. Norwood, MA: Christopher-Gordon Publishers, Inc.

Literature circles are...	Literature circles are not...
Reader response centered	Teacher and text centered
Part of a balanced literacy program	The entire reading curriculum
Groups formed by book choice	Teacher-assigned groups formed solely by ability
Structured for student independence, responsibility, and ownership	Unstructured, uncontrolled "talk time" without accountability
Guided primarily by student insights and questions	Guided primarily by teacher- or curriculum-based questions
Intended as a context in which to apply reading and writing skills	Intended as a place to do skills work
Flexible and fluid; never look the same twice	Tied to a prescriptive "recipe"

== Key features of literature circles ==
Features of literature circles include (Daniels, 1994):

1. Children choose their own reading materials.
2. Small temporary groups are formed, based on book choice.
3. Different groups read different books
4. Groups meet on a regular predictable schedule.
5. Students use written or drawn notes to guide both their reading and discussion.
6. Discussion topics come from the students
7. Group meetings aim to be open, natural conversations. Often the conversations digress to topics relating to the students or loosely to the books, but should eventually return to the novel.
8. The teacher serves as a facilitator, observer, listener and often a fellow reader, alongside the students. The teacher is not an instructor.
9. Students are given roles or jobs to complete for each group meeting.
10. The teacher should model how students should facilitate each role or job.
11. Evaluation is by teacher observation and student self-evaluation and should also include extension projects.
12. A spirit of playfulness and fun pervades the room.
13. New groups form around new reading choices.

Discussion prompts can be given by the teacher to encourage a direction for the students' responses, such as "How does the setting affect the characters?" "What are alternative solutions to the character's conflicts in the text?" "What connections can you make with regard to the character's situation(s)?"

== Implementation considerations ==
Students begin literature circles by participating in mini-lessons on how to participate in a discussion group. To begin with they may be given role sheets to assist them in taking notes on their reading and preparing for the discussion.

Sticky notes (e.g. PostIt notes) are often distributed by teachers to assist students in recording their thoughts about text elements, as they make access easy to various pages in the book. Clip boards may assist children in using their role sheets when groups use floor space to conduct their discussions.

As group discussions evolve and improve, ideally the role sheets should eventually be used only for redirecting the discussion when students get off-track. In fact, Daniels notes that "the goal of role sheets is to make the role sheets obsolete" (Daniels, 1994, p. 75). What he means by this is that role sheets help students stay on task and focus their discussions. As students become more comfortable in their groups and learn the level of discourse and response that is expected of them, ideally they will no longer need the role sheets at all: "In many classrooms, the role sheets are abandoned as soon as groups are capable of lively, text-centered, multifaceted discussions" (Daniels, 1994, p. 75). Schlick Noe and Johnson note that role sheets take focus and energy away from group discussions: "Students can learn collaborative and individual accountability strategies to make their discussions work without the constraints of role sheets" (Schlick Noe and Johnson, 1999). Most teachers starting out may, however, wish to assign roles to students to help them learn some of the structures of Literature Circles and to aid in classroom management.

== Roles in literature circles ==
The following is a list of roles which give a thinking task to each group member. Students divide the tasks among themselves in each group. As the groups reconvene each session, students switch roles, so that by the end of the literature circles "unit," each student will have the opportunity to participate in each role. Again, the ideal is to eventually do away with the roles, although many teachers opt to continue using the roles to assist group on-task behaviour. One thing to keep in mind: Readers who are deeply engaged with a book and eager to talk about it with others may not need the structure of roles. Many teachers discover that the roles feel restrictive to some students and can become a disincentive to take part in literature circles. Harvey Daniels always intended roles to be a temporary scaffold to support students as they learn to talk about books in small groups.

=== Discussion facilitator ===
This role involves developing a list of questions that the group might discuss about the section of the novel to be discussed for that meeting. Questions should be designed to promote lively conversation and insights about the book; they should be open questions. A person with this task asks these questions of the group to prompt discussion; overall, the job is to keep the group talking and on-task. Questions that a student might ask could be: "What was going through your mind when you read this passage?" or "How did the main character change as a result of this incident?"

=== Commentator ===
This role involves locating a few significant passages of text that are thought-provoking, funny, interesting, disturbing, or powerful. The quotations are copied down with properly cited page numbers. A student with this task can read the passages out loud him/herself or ask other group members to read as well. Commentary and discussion will be generated from these passages.

=== Illustrator ===
As the term implies, this job entails drawing, sketching, or painting a picture, portrait or scene relating to the appropriate section of the novel. Collages from magazines, images from the internet, and other media can also be used. The student with this role then shares the artwork with the group, explaining the passage(s) that relate to the art. Often students who do not like to write do very well with this role. The pictures usually generate interesting group conversations.

=== Connector or reflector ===
This role involves locating several significant passages in the novel and connecting these passages to real life. The connections might relate to school, friends or family, home, the community, or they might relate to movies, celebrities, the media etc. Students should also feel free to connect incidents or characters with other books that they have read. Of all the roles, this role is often the most personal in its focus.

=== Summarizer ===
This role involves preparing a brief summary of the reading that was assigned for that day's meeting. The summary should include the main ideas or events to remember, major characters, symbols or other significant highlights of the passage. Good summarizers are important to literature circles, as they can help their peers see the overall picture (DaLie, 2001). Also include important events and details.

=== Vocabulary enricher ===
Also called the Word Master or Word Wizard, this role is to record important words for that day's reading. Words that are unusual, unknown, or that stand out in some way are usually chosen by the student. Their page number and definition is also recorded. Often students do not see this role as particularly stimulating; however, it can be a role suited to students who are still developing confidence in English classes or textual analysis.

=== Travel tracer ===
This role involves recording where the major shifts in action or location take place in the novel for the reading section. Keeping track of shifts in place, time, and characters helps students keep track of important shifts in the novel. Artistic students also are drawn to this role, as artwork can be incorporated into this role as well. The student's role is to describe each setting in detail, using words or maps that illustrate the action.

=== Investigator ===
This role includes investigative work where background information needs to be found on any topic relating to the book. Historical, geographical, cultural, musical or other information that would help readers connect to the novel is often researched and shared with the group. The research is informal in nature, providing small bits of information in order that others can better understand the novel.

=== Figurative language finder ===
This role includes identification of various types of figurative language, including but not limited to simile, metaphor, personification, hyperbole, and idiom. This may lead to discussion about the author's craft – why the author chose to use those particular words or phrases, and whether or not they were effective. This in-context identification can be more relevant and memorable than isolated instruction by the teacher of these types of tools.

== Assessment and evaluation ==
Most teachers assess and evaluate what students do in Literature Circles. This may involve one or several of the following assessment(s) and evaluation(s):

Self-assessment
Students should be involved in monitoring and recording their own level of response and engagement with their book and participation with their group as they meet each session. Often formal checklists are used for students to keep track of their progress.
Peer assessment
Students can also be empowered to assess their fellow group members over the course of their book talks. As with self-assessment, checklists or other rubrics can provide structure.
Observations
On-going teacher observation and active participation in group discussions is critical in assessing student progress both individually and in whole group. Daniels (1994) notes that most assessment should be formative, ensuring that students are provided with timely feedback to learn more effectively. Observations can meet such formative assessment criteria.
Conferences
Face-to-face conversations between student and teacher can help to "access, track and monitor student growth" (Daniels, 1994, p. 160).
Portfolios
Collections of student products, collected and assembled in a meaningful fashion, provide the opportunity for reflection, discussion, response to the book, and displaying a student's best work. Portfolios can take on many forms, ranging from writing, art, video/audiotapes, learning logs, student journals, personal responses etc. (Daniels, 1994).
Extension projects
Extension projects can take the form of numerous creative and artistic student products, from book jackets to visual media or printed forms. Projects provide readers with "additional ways to revisit what they've read, continue the conversations (and the discoveries), and create even more meaning" (Schlick Noe & Johnson, 1999). More conversations about the books usually arise out of sharing of these projects with the group and the whole class.
Student artifacts
Response logs, role sheets, and other process material that students have compiled over the course of the Literature Circle meetings can be also evaluated providing "a rich source of insight" (Daniels, 1994, p. 164) for the teacher to assess growth and progress of students.
Wikis and blogs
Students may blog on a teacher created website. This blog will not only facilitate conversation, but implement technology. The blog will also give teachers a means by which to grade and assess the quality of student comprehension. Blogs enable students to share ideas, read class notes, and give feedback to the class.

== See also ==
- Collaborative learning
- Literature Circles in EFL
- Louise Rosenblatt
- Reader-response criticism
- Readers' advisory
