= Books Unbanned =

Brooklyn Public Library program

Books Unbanned is a United States library program that issues library cards nationwide from regional libraries in order to give electronic access to the library's digital and audio collections to teens and young adults living in U.S. locations where books are being challenged. Initially established by the Brooklyn Public Library, it was created in response to a wave of book challenges against schools and libraries in 2021 and now encompasses five libraries across the United States.

== History ==
Efforts to censor teenage access to books in the United States swelled in 2021 after a video of a parent at a Fairfax County, Virginia, school board meeting demanding removal of the graphic novel Gender Queer from the high school library went viral. Afterward, libraries and classrooms across the US became targets of coordinated campaigns frequently led or funded by right-wing activists.

In April 2022, the Brooklyn Public Library (BPL) introduced the Books Unbanned program in response to the movement, offering free BPL ecards to teens and young adults aged 13 to 21 anywhere in the US. Teens apply to get an ecard through email or the library-run Instagram account. By January 2023, 6,000 teenagers had requested cards through the BPL's Books Unbanned program and 52,000 books had been checked out.

On April 27, 2023, the Seattle Public Library joined the Books Unbanned initiative, making it the second library system to participate. Seattle's ecard is for teens and young adults aged 13 to 26. In October 2023, in honor of Banned Books Week, the program expanded to three more libraries: Boston Public Library, LA County Library, and San Diego Public Library.

== Participants ==
Library	Date Joined	Ages Served	Locations Served
Brooklyn Public Library	April 2022	13-21	USA
Seattle Public Library	April 27, 2023	13-26	USA
Boston Public Library	October 2023	13-26	USA
LA County Library	October 2023	13-18	California
San Diego Public Library	October 2023	12-26	USA

== Impact ==
In August 2022, a teacher in Oklahoma was put on administrative leave after posting the QR code for BPL's Books Unbanned in her classroom. The Oklahoma Secretary of Education called to have her teaching license revoked. The teacher subsequently resigned and, several months later, accepted a job with the Brooklyn Public Library.

== Awards ==
- In 2023, Books Unbanned was recognized as Librarians of the Year by Library Journal
- In 2023, Books Unbanned was given Fast Company's World Changing Ideas Award
- In 2023, Books Unbanned received the Defender Award from the Dramatists Legal Defense Fund and the Dramatists Guild of America

== See also ==
- Book banning in the United States (2021–present)
