= Archie McPhee =

American novelty dealer

- Type: Private
- Industry: Novelty dealer
- Founded: 1983; 43 years ago
- Key people: Mark Pahlow, owner
- Products: Assorted novelty items
- Website: mcphee.com

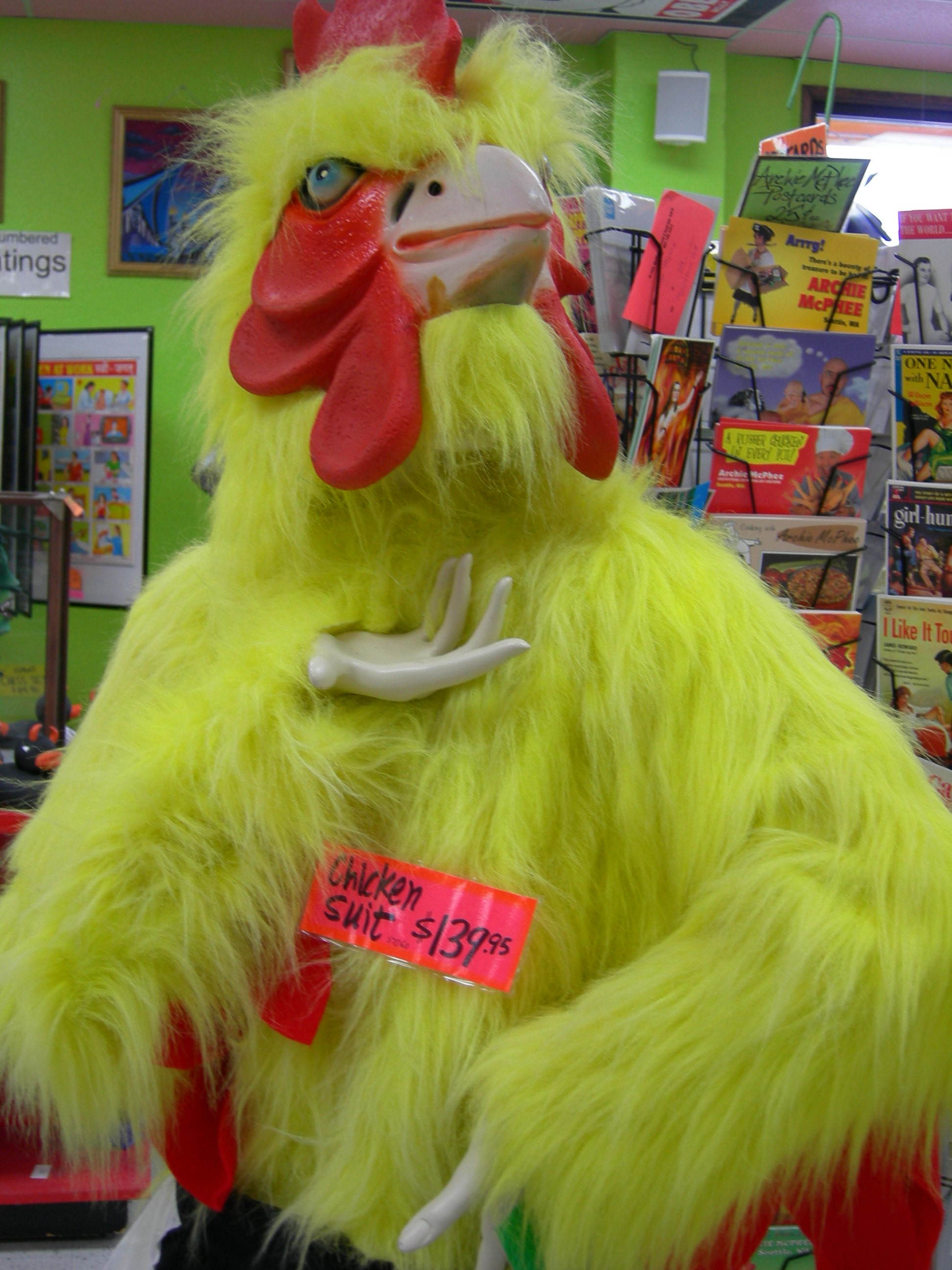
Chicken suit at the Archie McPhee store

Archie McPhee is a Seattle-based novelty dealer owned by Mark Pahlow. Begun in the 1970s in Los Angeles as the mail-order business Accoutrements, in 1983 it opened a retail outlet dubbed "Archie McPhee" after Pahlow's wife's great-uncle.

== History ==
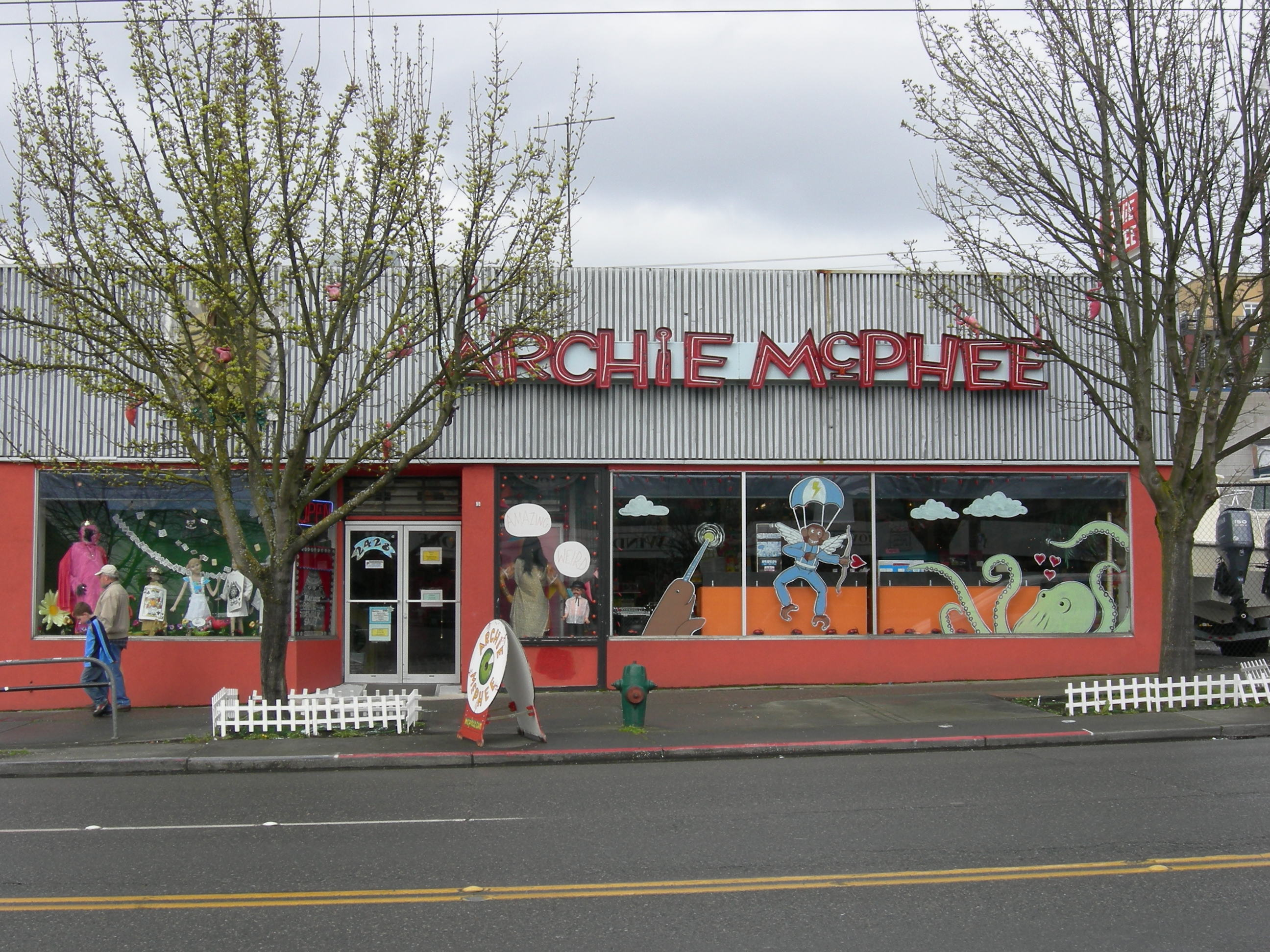
The Archie McPhee store in Ballard, which closed in 2009

Mark Pahlow began selling "quirky and unusual items" in the 1970s through a mail-order business named Accoutrements that was based in Los Angeles. The company opened their first retail outlet in the Fremont neighborhood of Seattle in July 1983; the store was named Archie McPhee for Pahlow's wife's great-uncle, a jazz musician and jokester. The company's main warehouse and offices opened in 1996 at a suburban business park in Mukilteo.

The Archie McPhee store relocated in 1999 to a larger storefront in the city's Ballard neighborhood. The company later bought a neighboring liquor store that it converted into a home decor store named "More Archie McPhee".

In 2009, the store moved to a smaller space in Wallingford.

== Products ==
The company's line expanded from rubber chickens to glow-in-the-dark aliens, bacon-scented air freshener, and hula-girl swizzle sticks among other items. It became a popular Seattle tourist destination while maintaining enough countercultural credentials that Ben & Jerry's Wavy Gravy ice cream was introduced at a party on the premises in 1993.

Its kitsch appeal received further national attention from the Librarian Action Figure. In 2002, Nancy Pearl told Pahlow over dinner that librarians like herself "perform miracles every day". Pearl later posed for a 13 cm hard plastic doll, and librarians from all around the world registered their dismay at its "amazing push-button shushing action!"

Archie McPhee has since been featured in Scientific American's "Technology and Business" review and Time magazine's fifty coolest websites of 2005. In 2018, Archie McPhee opened the Rubber Chicken Museum inside its Wallingford location.

== See also ==
- Horse head mask
