= Horse head mask =

Rubber mask resembling a horse, a fad of the early 2010s

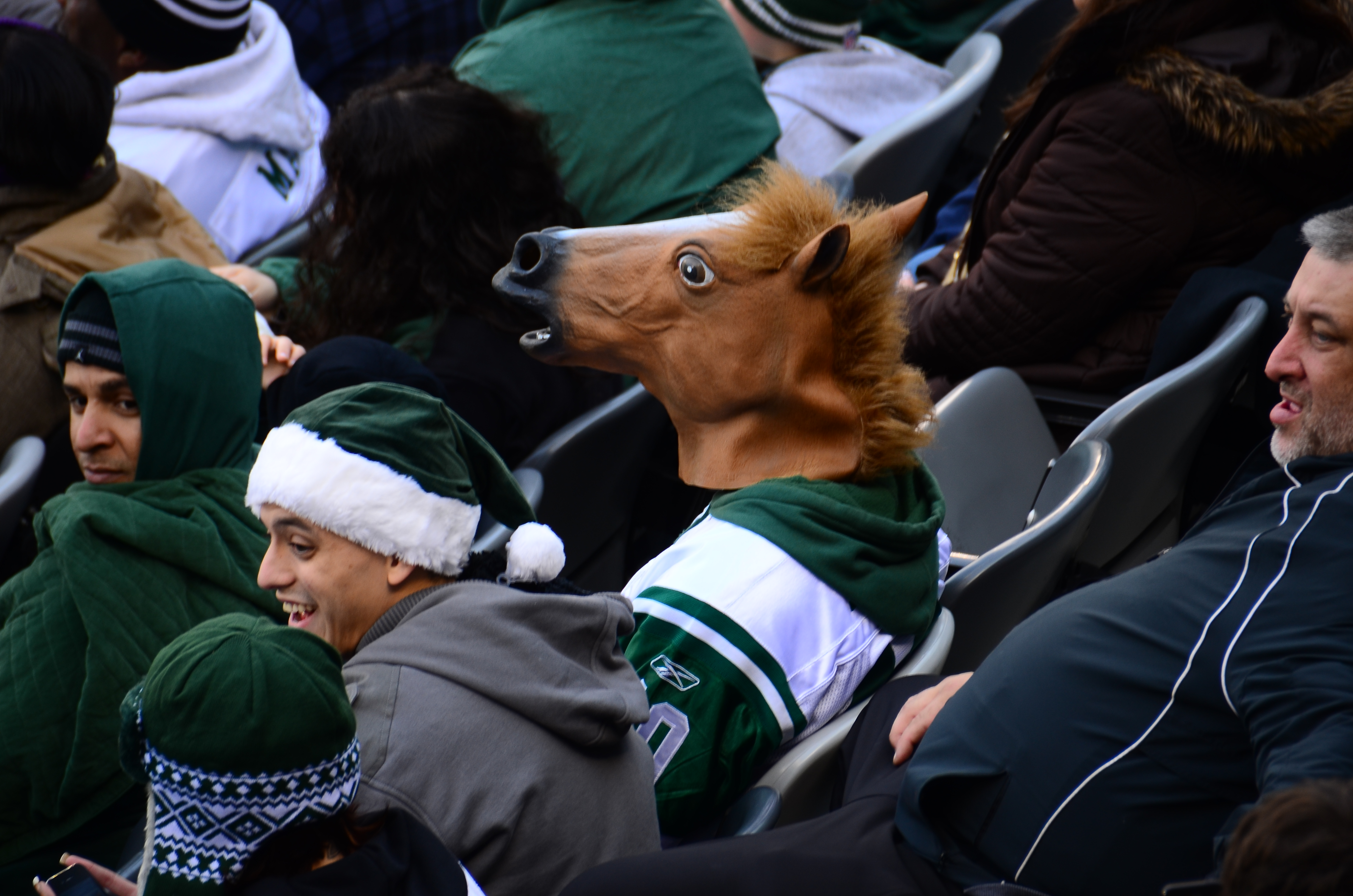
"A person wearing a Horse Head Mask looks downright disturbing," according to the original manufacturer Archie McPhee.

The horse head mask is a latex mask representing a horse head originally manufactured by novelty purveyor Archie McPhee, and now widely available from other manufacturers. It covers the entire head and is typically part of a Halloween costume, or is worn at other times to be funny, shocking, incongruous, or hip, or to disguise one's identity. It has also become an internet meme.

== Origin and meme history ==
The horse mask was originally sold by novelty purveyor Archie McPhee as a Halloween costume since at least 2003. Marketed under the name "Horse Head Mask", is made of "realistic brown latex with faux fur mane." McPhee claims "a person wearing a Horse Head Mask looks downright disturbing" and that the mask "has become a worldwide phenomenon". Other manufacturers have since closely copied its look and design.

It is unclear when the mask transitioned from a novelty item to a meme, but there were a number of "accelerants" according to Caitlin Dewey of The Washington Post. In 2003, the Japanese anime Full Metal Panic? introduced the character Pony-man, "a horse-headed villain who pursued schoolgirls with a hairbrush". Pony-man resembled someone wearing the McPhee horse mask, and since the masks were already being sold, "pony-man kept cropping up". In 2005, Lonely Planet recommended wearing a horse mask while traveling in its Guide to Experimental Travel. Soon after, comedian/actor Tom Green wore a horse mask while screaming and shaking his head around for an episode of his Internet talk show, Tom Green's House Tonight. In January 2008, a performance artist named Wotaken filmed himself picking, cooking, and eating psychedelic mushrooms while completely naked, wearing a horse head mask and dancing to the Final Fantasy soundtrack "Dancing Mad". This film was uploaded to YouTube, received over 2 million views, and propelled the mask to greater prominence. The video has since been taken down for violating the site's terms of service.

After Wotaken's naked psychedelic cooking video, the horse head mask became a more common Internet meme. In 2010 a Scottish man known as "horse boy" was captured by Google Street View; and during Hurricane Sandy, in Washington, D. C., a shirtless man wearing a horse head mask was filmed jogging through a live news shot.

Photographs of President Obama and a person in a horse head mask went viral in July 2014

In July 2014, President Barack Obama was photographed in the streets of Denver shaking the hand of a horse-headed bystander, resulting in national press exposure of the mask, including a series of articles in The Washington Post about the meme's history and cultural influences.

== Users ==
Some YouTube video contributors have chosen the horse head mask as their trademark, including Sir Sebastian of "Sir Sebastian's Candy Corner," a candy and chocolate reviewer, as well as a Berlin street performer, "The Neigh Kid Horse," who has been photographed by hundreds of amateur and professional photographers, and who is known for only wearing the mask and his underwear.

== Unicorn head mask ==
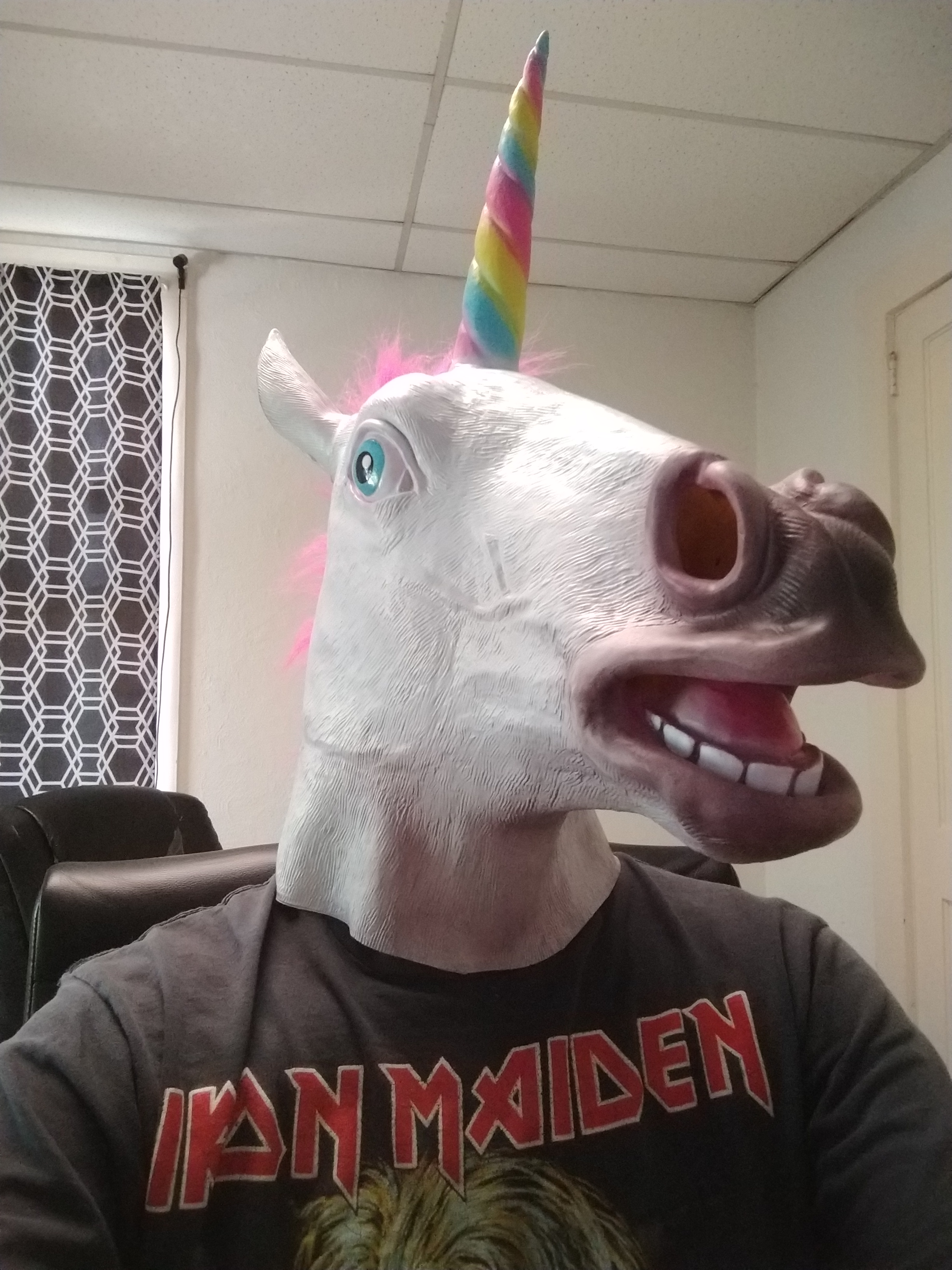
A unicorn mask from Archie McPhee

Unicorn head masks are also sold by Archie McPhee and others. They have been used by Arizona State Sun Devils fans as part of attempts to distract opposing free throw shooters.

== Antecedents ==
Although the modern horse head mask meme began with the Archie McPhee rubber mask in 2003, there have been earlier antecedents. In 1997, the British satirical news miniseries Brass Eye briefly showed a horse head mask in the second episode titled "Drugs". In 2001, it appeared in the music video for "Crying at the Discoteque" by Swedish pop group Alcazar, among other animal masks.
