= Morton Grove Public Library =

Public library in Morton Grove, Illinois, U.S.

- 42°02′08″N 87°46′51″W
- Location: 6140 Lincoln Avenue, Morton Grove, Illinois, United States
- Established: 1938

Access and use
- Circulation: over 300,000 items
- Population served: 23,270

Other information
- Director: Pamela Leffler
- Employees: 45
- Website: http://www.mgpl.org

The Morton Grove Public Library (MGPL) is a public library that serves residents and businesses of the village of Morton Grove, Illinois. Morton Grove is located 12 miles (19 km) north of downtown Chicago. The library is located at 6140 Lincoln Avenue, Morton Grove, IL 60053 and serves a population of 23,270 residents. The mission of the Morton Grove Public Library is to "provide a place offering materials, programs, and services to assist the community in its pursuit of personal growth and lifelong learning."

The library is a member of the Reaching Across Illinois Library System (RAILS), a consortium of 1,300 public, private, academic, and school libraries located throughout northern and western Illinois covering an area of 27,000 square miles and one of three Illinois library systems. The library was formerly a member of North Suburban Library System (NSLS).

== History ==
The library was established in 1938 with federal Works Progress Administration (WPA) financial assistance supplementing community action and in response to the educational and cultural needs of a growing community of interested and spirited citizens during the Great Depression years. Beginning with a volunteer staff and 300 books collected through donations placed in a barrel at Village Hall, the first library was opened using floor space in a store at 6100 Lincoln Avenue. The library remained at this location for about seven years until the owner of the store needed to expand.

The library was moved to another store located at 6244 Lincoln Avenue. Volunteers staffed the desk and the library remained at this location for three years when it was forced to find a new location.

The library made its second move to a temporary home in 1948 when it relocated to the second floor of the old Callie Avenue fire station. The Fire Department's need to reclaim that space spurred efforts to obtain a permanent library site by concerned citizens who saw the need to develop and construct a permanent building.

Monument Park had been purchased by the Women's War Working Circle as the site for their Doughboy statue, erected in 1921 to honor World War I veterans. Because of this interest in the library, the Women's War Working Circle deeded the park property to the village, provided that the property be used as the site of a library. Village residents' 1949 approval of a $33,000 bond issue paved the way for the construction of Morton Grove's first permanent library building, in Monument Park, at Georgiana and Lincoln Avenues.

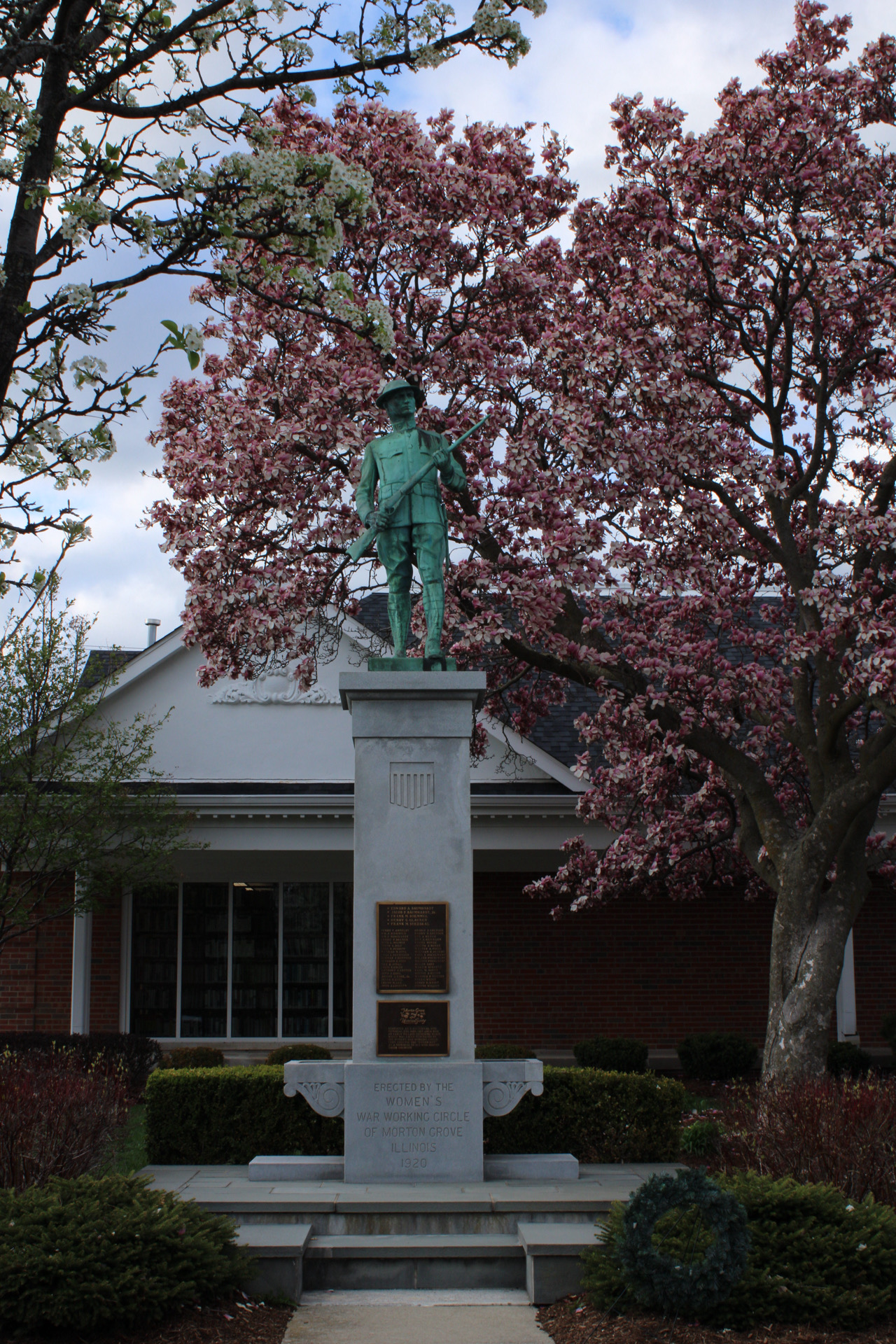
Ww1 statue Build at the Morton grove public library

The Morton Grove Public Library was dedicated and opened in its permanent facility on February 3, 1952. The new building had 1,500 square feet (140 m^{2}) of floor space and housed a collection of over 4,000 books. By 1954, with Morton Grove growing rapidly in the post-World War II housing boom, the collection had grown to 5,300 volumes with an annual circulation of 21,000 items.

In June 1956, the basement level of the new library was remodeled for use as a Children's Room.

=== 1962 addition and further expansion ===
In 1962, after a decade of rapid growth, the residents approved a $277,000 referendum for the construction of a 11,500-square-foot (1,070 m^{2}) addition which included a room for educational and cultural programs and meetings. The building grew to 13,000 square feet (1,200 m^{2}) and provided seating for 110 patrons and room for a 55,000 volume collection.

In 1965, the library was one of twenty-two founding member libraries of the North Suburban Library System (NSLS). NSLS enabled member libraries to exchange information, share resources and establish a reciprocal borrowing program, which has led, through the years, to the practice of honoring library cards of residents throughout the state. NSLS also organized a Central Serials Service (CSS) to permit broad public access to articles from numerous periodicals. CSS was housed in the basement of the library's facility until 1994, when loss of state funding led to its closing.

In 1969, a $240,000 referendum was passed for the remodeling of the lower level of the building into a new Children's Department. An outdoor sunken garden accessible through glass doors brightened the lower level area. The newly remodeled children's room opened on June 15, 1970.

The most recent expansion of the library's facility was opened in 1980 and included a 160-seat auditorium and additional office space.

=== Moving online with Webrary.org ===
In response to the burgeoning interest in the Internet, the Morton Grove Public Library registered the domain name "webrary.org" and the first version of the library's website went public in 1995. The website receives over 7,000 hits per day.

In 1997, the library became one of ten founding member libraries of NorthStarNet, a community information network and hosting service created by the North Suburban Library System (NSLS) to help libraries develop relationships with their local community groups by aiding those groups in establishing a Web presence. The Morton Grove Community Network site provided access and contact information on businesses and organizations relevant to the residents of Morton Grove. In 2007, after NSLS ceased hosting the NorthStarNet program, the library continued to maintain the community site until 2009.

In addition to the website, the Morton Grove Public Library also offers virtual reference and digital reference services. The library was an early participant in AskAway, a consortium of Illinois and Wisconsin libraries, but now offers Meebo instant messaging services when the library is open. In July 2012 the library began using LibraryH3lp for its chat reference service when Meebo ceased operation.

In 2012, the library moved from its webrary.org domain to mgpl.org with the design and implementation of a new website.

To augment the library's communication to its community, a number of blogs were begun, each with a specific target audience: adults, teens, pre-teens, and parents of younger children. In 2012, the Morton Grove Public Library decided to focus on more of the social networking outlets available aimed at communicating to its community, including Facebook, Twitter, FourSquare, YouTube, Flickr, and Instagram. They have phased out their blogs and put Tumblr on hiatus.

A major presence on these social networking entities was Mr. M (as in "M"orton Grove), who began life as the avatar, or persona, of the library's Twitter account, where he served as a digital guide "prospecting the modern world's information deluge for the exceptional, the curious and the enlightening." The Mr. M persona was retired in September 2015.

In late 2014, the library began a major renovation of the interior of the building that continued until May 2015. The renovation consisted of moving the entire book collection to the main floor, moving staff offices from the main floor to the mezzanine, adding 4 study rooms and a digital media lab to the mezzanine and reconfiguring the circulation and reference departments. During renovation, the library remained open to patrons with limited services. The Grand Reopening was Monday, May 4, 2015.

== Specialized services ==
- Fiction_L - an electronic mailing list devoted to reader's advisory topics such as book discussions, booktalks, collection development issues, booklists and bibliographies, and a wide variety of other topics of interest to librarians, book discussion leaders, and others with an interest in reader's advisory. Fiction_L was developed for and by librarians dealing with fiction collections and requests; however fiction lovers worldwide are welcome to join the discussion. Among the topics discussed have been: genre study, bibliographies, workshops, audiobooks, reading clubs, and print and electronic resources The discussion is not limited to fiction, but rather covers all aspects of reader's advisory for children, young adults and adults, including non-fiction materials.
  - As of June 15, 2016, Fiction_L is now managed by the Cuyahoga County Public Library.
- MatchBook Plus - a collection of special services that allow the individual patron to keep up-to-date on what has been added to the collection at the Morton Grove Public Library. There are four components to MatchBookPlus, each focusing on a unique aspect of the collection. MatchBook Classic consists of lists of all new purchases by the Morton Grove Public Library, with some titles having brief annotations. The patron selects from over 80 subjects and/or genres for their profile and then receives a monthly mailed or e-mailed list of new purchases in their selected areas. MatchBook Select consists of a variety of newsletters focusing on selected titles, complete with full annotations, and e-mailed to the patron. MatchBook for Kids is similar to the MatchBook Classic service, but for materials in the Youth Services Department, with over 50 nonfiction, fiction and audiovisual categories selected especially for children (through grade 6) and their parents. MatchBook DIY (Do It Yourself) is a cumulative, searchable database that lets the patron generate their own MatchBook list from the last twelve months' of purchases at the Morton Grove Public Library.
  - MatchBook was phased out in August 2015.

== Library directors ==
- Myra Aggen, 1955–1971
- Joan Stewart, 1971–1985
- Paul Feil, 1985–1988
- Sharron McCoy, 1988–2005
- Benjamin H. Schapiro, 2005–2011
- Pamela Leffler, 2012–2013
- Debra Strombres, 2014–2016
- Pamela Leffler, 2016–present

== Awards/grants ==
- 1962 - ALA/LAMA John Cotton Dana Award for building referendum PR campaign
- 1992 - Online Ready Reference Service (ORRS) wins Gale/RASD Research Award for Excellence in Reference and Adult Services
- 1997 - MatchBook wins the Library Public Relations Council's 1997 L. PeRCy Award, Division One, for library public relations materials.
- 1997 - Barbara Sclafani named "Best Page in Libraryland" by Will's World, a column in American Libraries magazine.
- 1999 - Mini-Grant, Bring In an Expert for marketing/writing a marketing plan from the Illinois State Library
- 2000 - Received $1,000 Adult New Reader Materials Grant from Illinois State Library
- 2001 - Received Collection Connection grant from ISL for expanding and updating the science book collection.
- 2001 - Received Assistive Technology grant from ISL for Aladdin Ambassador Reading Machine.
- 2001 - Estelle Cooperman named NSLS Trustee of the Year 2000
- 2002 - Named NSLS Library of the Year 2001
- 2003 - Best of Show award from LAMA for MGPL bags promoting the library's Web site
- 2003 - Library Public Relations Council Award for "Share the Wealth Certificate of Merit" for refrigerator magnet, featuring photo of library with logo text.
- 2005 - MGPL newsletter Books & Beyond awarded the L.PeRcY Public Relations 1st Place Award, Division 1
- 2005 - The L.PeRcY Public Relations 1st Place Award, Division 1, for Web sites
- 2009 - National Network of Libraries of Medicine Greater Midwest Region (NN/LM GMR) Exhibit Award, for the Low Vision Fair 2009, September 26, 2009, in Niles, IL
- 2011 - 2nd runner-up for Playaway Picture This contest, a nationwide library competition

== Resources ==
The library serves the informational, professional, educational and recreational needs of Morton Grove's diverse, multicultural community. Morton Grove Public Library's building of 31,000 square feet (2,900 m^{2}) houses more than 142,000 items with an annual circulation of over 300,000 items. A variety of resources is available including:

- Books
  - Fiction and nonfiction books (also available in large print), graphic novels, teen books
- Audiovisual material
  - DVDs and Blu-rays, CDs, audiobooks on CD, video games
- Periodicals
  - Magazines, newspapers
- Downloadable eBooks and audiobooks on OverDrive, Hoopla, and Baker & Taylor's Axis360 app
- Free access to subscription databases, including Ancestry.com, Consumer Reports, lynda.com, and Morningstar

== Programs ==
The library provides free programs for children and adults.

=== Adults ===
- Art Lectures
- Music Performances
- Cooking Demonstrations
- Theatrical Presentations
- Health Programs
- Feature Films
- Foreign Films
- Travel Programs and Films
- Computer Classes and Tutorials

=== Children ===
- Storytime
- Playtime
- Wee Read Lapsit
- Video Gaming
- Drama Club
- Knitting Club
- Moovin' & Groovin'
- Family Chess Club
- Family Films
- Theatrical Presentations
