= Katherine Schlick Noe =

Professor of Education

Dr. Katherine L. Schlick Noe is an American professor. She is Professor of Education and Director of Literacy in the College of Education at Seattle University in Seattle, Washington.

== Education ==
A former high school English and reading teacher, Schlick Noe received her Ph.D. in Reading/Language Arts from the University of Washington.

== Research ==
She is noted for her research on Literature Circles. Literature Circles are small, student-centered book groups based on student choice and a variety of novels, as opposed to one core, classroom text or book; this approach to reading and learning emphasizes Collaborative learning and Scaffolding Theory. Reader-Response Criticism, Independent Reading, and Student-centered learning also comprise most of the theoretical underpinning of Literature Circles.

== Teaching ==
Schlick Noe is a faculty member in the College of Education at Seattle University. She works with beginning teachers in the Master in Teaching Program and directs the master's degree program in Literacy for Special Needs, preparing reading specialists.

== Publications ==
Her books for children include:

- "Something to Hold" published by Clarion Books (December 2011)

Her publications exploring Literature Circles include:

- Literature Circles and Response (Hill, Johnson, & Schlick Noe, 1995),
- Getting Started with Literature Circles (Schlick Noe & Johnson, 1999),
- Literature Circles Resource Guide (Hill, Schlick Noe, & Johnson, 2001) and
- Literature Circles in Middle School: One Teacher's Journey (Hill, Schlick Noe, & King, 2003).
