= The Book Club Bible =

Non-fiction anthology of literary review by Lionel Shriver

The Book Club Bible is a non-fiction anthology of literary review, with a foreword by Lionel Shriver, whose novel We Need to Talk About Kevin has its own prominent entry. Aside from providing a synopsis for each book, the text also features background information on the author, suggested comparison volumes, a detailed historical context and starting points for group discussion. The intention of the anthology is to encourage book club members to seek out and discuss important contemporary or classical works.

== Novels featured ==
- Notes on a Scandal by Zoë Heller
- The Lovely Bones by Alice Sebold
- The Time Traveler's Wife by Audrey Niffenegger
- Lady Chatterley's Lover by D. H. Lawrence
- Rebecca by Daphne Du Maurier
- The Bell Jar by Sylvia Plath
- Atonement by Ian McEwan
- A Clockwork Orange by Anthony Burgess
