= The Mother-Daughter Book Club =

Series of children's novels

- The Mother-Daughter Book Club (2007); Much Ado About Anne (2008); Dear Pen Pal (2009); Pies and Prejudice (2010); Home for the Holidays (2011); Wish You Were Eyre (2012); Mother-Daughter Book Camp (2016)
- Author: Heather Vogel Frederick
- Country: United States
- Language: English
- Genre: Children’s novel
- Publisher: Simon & Schuster
- Published: 2007 – 2016 (initial publication)
- Media type: Print (paperback and hardcover); e-book
- No. of books: 7

The Mother-Daughter Book Club is a series of children's novels written by Heather Vogel Frederick. The books center around the lives of five different preteens, and eventually teenage girls who become best friends because of the book club that their mothers start. The girls live in a slightly fictionalized Concord, Massachusetts.

== Characters ==
Emma Jane Hawthorne - A bookworm whose mother is the local librarian and whose father is a published author, Emma starts off the series shy and reserved. Later on she takes up ice skating and bonds with her coach, while also dating Stewart Chadwick and practicing writing. She is the primary focus of the fourth book in the series, Pies and Prejudice.

Jessica Joy Delaney - The brains of the group and Emma's best friend, Jess is a hardworking girl. Jess's family owns Half Moon Farm and is riddled with financial problems. Her mother is an actress who returns to work on the farm when it causes a rift between her and the family. Later in the series, Jess begins attending a local boarding school on an academic scholarship, and dates Emma's popular older brother Darcy. The second book in the series, Much Ado About Anne, is mainly about her.

Megan Rose Wong - A seemingly stereotypical rich girl, Megan used to be friends with the popular girls before joining the book club, and is embarrassed by her mother who "gives their money away" to charities and is open about her vegan lifestyle. Megan's main hobby is fashion design, and she eventually attends Parsons in New York City for a BFA in Fashion. She dates British exchange student Simon Berkeley. She is the main focus of the third and sixth books Dear Pen Pal and Wish You Were Eyre.

Cassidy Ann Sloane - Cassidy moved to Concord from California after her father died, and lives in the shadow of her mother Clementine, a famous former model who later remarries and creates her own cooking show. Unlike her mother and sister, Cassidy is a tomboy who plays ice hockey, and despite not being nearly as interested in boys as the rest of the book club, gets together with both Zach Norton and Simon's brother Tristan Berkeley over the course of the series. The first book in the series, The Mother-Daughter Book Club, centers around her.

Rebecca Louise Chadwick - While a general mean girl in the first book, her mother Calliope forces her to join the book club in the second and she slowly forms a reluctant bond with the rest of the girls. Stubborn and boy crazy, Becca later becomes a waitress at the tea shop owned by Megan's grandmother, and attends the University of Minnesota with her boyfriend Theo Rochester. The book which centers around her is the Christmas special and fifth book in the series, Home for the Holidays.

== Plot ==
=== Middle school ===
In the first book in the series, The Mother-Daughter Book Club, the book club is formed by the mothers while all of the girls are in sixth grade. They become friends over the course of it and help Jess get her parents back together while reading Little Women by Louisa May Alcott.

In Much Ado About Anne, they read Anne of Green Gables by Lucy Maud Montgomery, and struggle with their mothers' decision to let Becca Chadwick into the book club. Meanwhile, Cassidy and her older sister Courtney discover that their mother has begun dating again, and Jess tries to keep her parents from selling Half Moon Farm.

In the third book Dear Pen Pal, the mothers set the girls up to be pen pals with another mother-daughter book club in Wyoming, whom they visit at the end of the book, and read Daddy Long Legs by Jean Webster. Jess transfers to a prestigious boarding school, Colonial Academy, after being offered an anonymous scholarship and clashes with her Southern roommate Savannah Sinclair, but also joins the school's a cappella group. Megan's grandmother Gigi moves in with the Wongs and Cassidy learns her mother is pregnant.

=== High school ===
The girls enter high school in Pies and Prejudice as Emma's family prepares to move to England for a year and swap houses with the Berkeley family. The book club continues over video call as they read Jane Austen's classic Pride and Prejudice. Jess begins rehabilitating wild animals, Emma develops a rivalry with the "British Becca" Annabelle (aka Stinkerbelle), Megan starts an anonymous fashion blog and a romance with Simon Berkeley. Cassidy enters an Elizabeth/Darcy esque dynamic with Simon's ice dancing brother Tristan and helps out with a hockey program called Chicks with Sticks. The book concludes with Megan's grandmother Gigi opening a tea shop called Pies and Prejudice.

The following book, Home for the Holidays, takes place over the course of a single month during the girls' sophomore year, as they read the Betsy-Tacy series by Maud Hart Lovelace and participate in a Secret Santa. It is also the first book in the series to include chapters from Becca's perspective, whose dad is laid off before she is set to visit her grandmother in Minnesota and her mother goes through a midlife crisis. Megan goes on a tropical cruise, and Jess is set to go on a skiing trip with Savannah, until she injures her leg in a sledding accident and is forced to spend Christmas with Emma, who is angry at her for wanting to go on the trip. Cassidy competes in a hockey tournament and tries to ward off the affections of Zach Norton, while dealing with Becca who is jealous of her relationship with Zach.

Wish You Were Eyre, wherein the girls read Jane Eyre by Charlotte Brontë, begins with the Wongs accepting a French exchange student named Sophie into their house, who develops a close bond with Gigi that Megan is envious of. Mrs. Wong runs for mayor with the help of Emma and her boyfriend Stewart. Becca meets the mysterious Theo on her trip to Minnesota. Megan visits Paris for Fashion Week as a birthday from Gigi. Gigi meets and dates Sophie's grandfather Edouard and they later marry. This, as well as "Home for the Holidays", all takes place during the girls' sophomore year.

The final book in the series, The Mother-Daughter Book Camp, follows the girls' experience as camp counselors at Camp Lovejoy, located in New Hampshire, the summer before their freshman year of college. Stewart broke up with Emma before the book begins. Emma is paired up to counselor with Jess's know-it-all cousin Felicia, who drove a wedge between the two in Home for the Holidays, while Jess is left with Cassidy and Megan co-counselors with Becca. Together with their campers, they read Dorothy Canfield Fisher's Understood Betsy.
