= Nancy Pearl =

American librarian, writer, and reading advocate

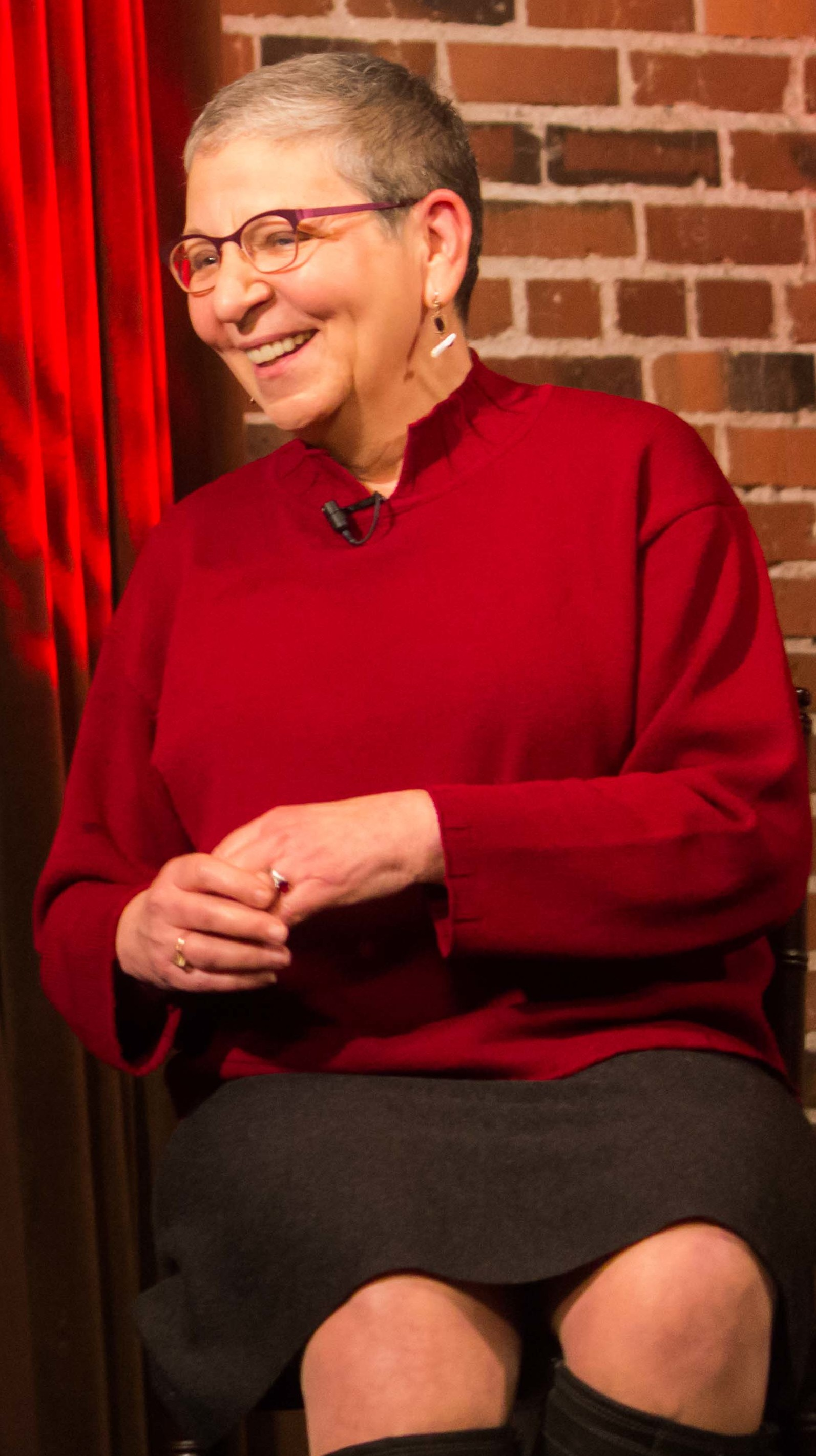
- Born: January 12, 1945 (age 81); Detroit, Michigan
- Occupation: Librarian
- Known for: Book Lust guidebook, blog, and radio commentary

Nancy Pearl (born January 12, 1945) is an American librarian, best-selling author, literary critic and the former executive director of the Washington Center for the Book at Seattle Public Library. Her prolific reading and her knowledge of books and literature first made her locally famous in Seattle, Washington, where she regularly appears on public radio recommending books. She achieved broader fame with Book Lust, her 2003 guide to good reading. Pearl was named 2011 Librarian of the Year by Library Journal. She is also the author of a novel and a memoir.

== Life ==
Nancy Pearl was raised in Detroit, Michigan and, by her own account, spent much time of her childhood at the public library. Her decision to become a librarian started at the age of 10 with the inspiration of the children's librarian at her local public library. She credits books and librarians with helping her through a difficult childhood: "It's not too much of an exaggeration—if it's one at all—to say that reading saved my life." She earned her master's in library science at the University of Michigan (1967) and became a children's librarian in her hometown library system before moving on to other libraries. As a hobby, Pearl wrote poetry as a young woman and in 1980 published a story in Redbook magazine called "The Ride to School."

Pearl moved with her husband, professor Joe Pearl, from Detroit to Oklahoma, where she raised two daughters (Eily Raman and Katie) while earning another master's degree, this one in history. She worked in an independent bookstore, Yorktown Alley, as well as the Tulsa City-County Library System. Craig Buthod, who worked with Pearl in Tulsa before he became the deputy director of the Seattle Public Library, recruited her to come to Seattle in 1993. She originally traveled to Seattle without her husband for four years, until he reached retirement age and joined her. Pearl said the decision to join the library was one of the few times in her life when she instinctively knew she was doing the right thing.

In Seattle, she became something of a local celebrity, founding the pioneering and much-imitated "If All Seattle Read The Same Book" project, encouraging every adult and every adolescent in the city to read the same book at the same time. The project, initially funded by a grant from the Lila Wallace-Reader's Digest Fund, was subsequently adopted by a number of cities, including Chicago, Buffalo and Rochester. Pearl appeared regularly on KUOW public radio to review and recommend books. While there she first came up with her "Rule of 50" to read a book's first 50 pages before deciding if you were interested enough to finish it or uninterested enough to quit. She later became the executive director of the library system's Washington Center for the Book. She has also taught a readers' advisory course at the University of Washington Information School called "Book Lust 101."

== Writing career ==
Pearl achieved broader fame with Book Lust: Recommended Reading for Every Mood, Moment and Reason (2003), her readers' advisory guide to good reading. More Book Lust (2005), with the same subtitle, received much acclaim ("a sprightly follow-up") and was chosen by the Today Show as one of its book-club selections. In March 2007, Pearl released a book of recommendations for children and teens titled Book Crush.

Pearl is also the author of the novel George & Lizzie and The Writer's Library, co-written with Jeff Schwager, which contains interviews with 23 American authors, including Pulitzer Prize-winners Michael Chabon, Jennifer Egan, Louise Erdrich, Richard Ford, Andrew Sean Greer, Viet Thanh Nguyen, and Donna Tartt.

== Editing career ==
In January 2012, Amazon.com announced that it would publish a number of out-of-print titles recommended by Pearl, in a venture called Book Lust Rediscoveries. Approximately six novels, originally published between 1960 and 2000, will be published each year in various print and electronic formats. For each title, Pearl will provide an introduction, book discussion points and suggestions for further reading.

"Amazon just blew me, my agent – both of us – away with their enthusiasm for doing something so wonderful as resurrecting books that never should have gone out of print in the first place," Pearl said on National Public Radio's Morning Edition. Although 20 traditional publishers had turned down Pearl's proposal for the rediscoveries, Amazon's agreement to re-issue the titles set off an intense negative response.

"I knew the minute I signed the contract that there would be people who would not be happy, but the vehemence surprised me," Pearl told The New York Times in February 2012. "I understand and sympathize with the concerns about Amazon's role in the world of books. If I had to do this deal all over again ... well, it's a hard question. But I would still want these books back in print."

Others applauded Pearl for rescuing beloved, out of print books, including two by American novelist and short-story writer Elizabeth Savage who'd once written "It is very dangerous to get caught without something to read"—a favorite line of Pearl's. Savage's novels, The Last Night at the Ritz and The Girls from the Five Great Valleys, now appear under the Book Lust label.

== Criticism ==
In 2003, Archie McPhee released a "Nancy Pearl Librarian Action Figure" with a "shushing" feature. The Washington Post reported that some librarians objected that the figure reinforced stereotypes of librarians.

In 2012, Pearl partnered with Amazon to publish the Book Lust Rediscoveries series of out-of-print books. The Christian Science Monitor quoted some independent booksellers and librarians who criticized the partnership because of Amazon’s competition with independent bookstores.

At a 2022 American Library Association conference panel on book bans, Pearl argued that opposition to censorship could require libraries to retain materials that librarians themselves found offensive. The School Library Journal reported that her remarks drew criticism after some participants interpreted them as supporting the inclusion of Holocaust-denial literature in library collections.

== Recognition and awards ==
Pearl has had her face on an American Library Association poster and has received numerous awards. Her book reviews appear in The Seattle Times, Booklist, Library Journal, and on the radio on KUOW-FM Seattle, and KWGS Tulsa, Oklahoma.

In 2003 she received an unusual honor when the Seattle-based company Accoutrements created a librarian action figure in her likeness to be sold in their Seattle store, Archie McPhee. Featuring Pearl with a stack of books and a finger to her lips, the doll's "push to shush" action was popular with some librarians and dismaying to others who felt that the doll reinforced librarian stereotypes. Pearl herself said that the shushing aspect of the action figure would determine "which librarians have a sense of humor."

A tribute band called 'The Nancy Pearls' gave their debut bluegrass performance on the Mitchell Library rooftop (Sydney, Australia) on December 17, 2004.

=== Awards ===
- 1997 Open Book Award from the Pacific Northwest Writers Conference
- 1998 Totem Business and Professional Women's "Woman of Achievement Award"
- Library Journal's Fiction Reviewer of the Year (1998)
- Allie Beth Martin Award from the Public Library Association (2001)
- Washington (State) Humanities Award (2003)
- 2004 Brava Award from Women's University Club in Seattle, recognizing "women of exceptional ability in the greater Seattle area";
- Louis Shores—Greenwood Publishing Group Award, 2004 for excellence in book reviewing
- Annual award from the Women's National Book Association (2004–2005)
- Ontario Library Association Media and Communications Award (2004)
- 2011 Library Journal Librarian of the Year
- 2021 National Book Award Literarian Award for Outstanding Service to the American Literary Community (lifetime)

== Bibliography ==
- Now Read This: A Guide to Mainstream Fiction 1978–1998, Libraries Unlimited, 1999, ISBN 1-56308-659-X
- Now Read This II: A Guide to Mainstream Fiction, 1990–2001, Libraries Unlimited, 2002, ISBN 1-56308-867-3
- Book Lust: Recommended Reading for Every Mood, Moment, and Reason, Sasquatch Books, Seattle, 2003, ISBN 1-57061-381-8
- More Book Lust: Recommended Reading for Every Mood, Moment, and Reason, Sasquatch Books, Seattle, 2005, ISBN 1-57061-435-0
- Book Crush: For Kids and Teens : Recommended Reading For Every Mood, Moment, and Interest, Sasquatch Books, Seattle, 2007, ISBN 978-1-57061-500-9
- Book Lust To Go, Recommended Reading for Travelers, Vagabonds, and Dreamers, Sasquatch Books, Seattle, 2010, ISBN 978-1-57061-650-1
