= Jo Budler =

Former State Librarian of Kansas

Jo Budler is a librarian from Kansas who served as the State Librarian of Kansas from 2010 to 2017, the sixteenth state librarian.

Budler was an effective advocate for digital content in the state of Kansas, helping consolidate purchasing of digital items to save money for Kansas residents. She also communicated directly to Kansas residents how the ebook business worked for libraries, as well as served on the national Ebook Task Force of the Chief Officers of State Library Agencies. Her work won her Library Journal's Librarian of the Year award in 2013.

Prior to coming to Kansas, Budler was appointed state librarian of Ohio in 2004. She also served as deputy state librarian of Michigan, as well as a librarian in the Legislative Reference Library in Nebraska.

== Early life ==
Budler grew up in Queens. She studied at Syracuse University and the University of Iowa, and got her LIS degree from UI in 1975 after receiving an MFA in The Iowa Writer's Workshop in 1974.
