= 1965 in literature =

This article contains information about the literary events and publications of 1965.

== Events ==
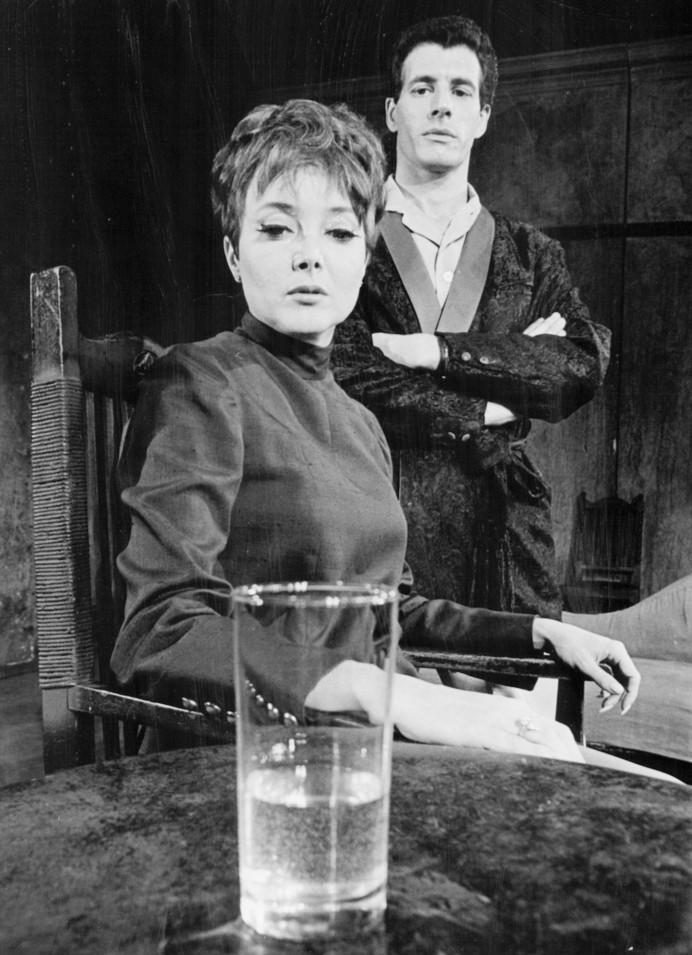
Carolyn Jones and John Church were replacements in the original Broadway production of The Homecoming, as "Ruth" and "Lenny" (1967).

- February 10 – Soviet fiction writers Yuli Daniel and Andrei Sinyavsky are sentenced to five and seven years, respectively, for "anti-Soviet" writings.
- February 20 – While Soviet author and translator Valery Tarsis is abroad, the Soviet Union negates his citizenship.
- March 26 – Harold Pinter's play The Homecoming receives its world première at the New Theatre, Cardiff, from the Royal Shakespeare Company under Peter Hall. Its London première follows on June 3 at the Aldwych Theatre, with Vivien Merchant, Pinter's wife at this time, appearing. It also appears in print this year.
- May 26 – The world première of A High Wind in Jamaica, a film from Richard Hughes's 1929 novel, featuring the future novelist Martin Amis, son of Kingsley Amis, as a teenage actor.
- June 11 – International Poetry Incarnation, a performance poetry event, takes place at London's Royal Albert Hall before an audience of 7,000, with members of the Beat Generation featuring. Adrian Mitchell reads "To Whom It May Concern".
- June 17 – The London première of Frank Marcus' farce The Killing of Sister George (at the Duke of York's Theatre) is among the first mainstream British plays with lesbian characters. Beryl Reid plays the title rôle. It has been previewed in April at the Bristol Old Vic.
- June 19 – J. D. Salinger's novella "Hapworth 16, 1924" takes up most of an issue of The New Yorker magazine dated today. It will be the last of his works published before his death in 2010.
- June 30 – The English novelists Kingsley Amis and Elizabeth Jane Howard marry at Marylebone register office in London, as his second marriage and her third.
- November 10 – Chinese critic Yao Wenyuan publishes a review of a Beijing Opera production of Wu Han's Hai Rui Dismissed from Office in the Shanghai daily newspaper Wenhui Bao, claiming the drama to be counter-revolutionary, a starting point for the Cultural Revolution in China.
- unknown dates
  - After the text of Heiner Müller's play Der Bau (Construction Site) is published in Sinn und Form, authorities in East Germany prevent a stage première until 1980.
  - The Nebula Award is conceived by Lloyd Biggle, Jr. The first award will be made next year to Frank Herbert's Dune.
  - The National Library of New Zealand is formed by merging the Alexander Turnbull Library, the National Library Service and the General Assembly Library under the National Library Act of this year.

== New books ==
=== Fiction ===
- Cécile Aubry – Belle et Sébastien
- J. G. Ballard – The Drought
- John Bingham – A Fragment of Fear
- Ray Bradbury – The Vintage Bradbury
- John Brunner
  - The Martian Sphinx as Keith Woodcott
  - The Squares of the City
- Kenneth Bulmer – Land Beyond the Map
- Edgar Rice Burroughs – Tarzan and the Castaways
- Victor Canning – The Whip Hand
- John Dickson Carr – The House at Satan's Elbow
- Agatha Christie – At Bertram's Hotel
- L. Sprague de Camp
  - The Arrows of Hercules
  - The Spell of Seven (ed.)
- August Derleth – The Casebook of Solar Pons
- Philip K. Dick – The Three Stigmata of Palmer Eldritch
- Margaret Drabble – The Millstone
- Ian Fleming (died 1964) – The Man with the Golden Gun
- Margaret Forster – Georgy Girl
- Witold Gombrowicz – Kosmos
- Richard Gordon – Love and Sir Lancelot
- Winston Graham – After the Act
- Graham Greene – The Comedians
- Frank Herbert – Dune
- Arthur Hailey – Hotel
- James Leo Herlihy – Midnight Cowboy
- Bohumil Hrabal – Ostře sledované vlaky (Closely Observed Trains)
- Pamela Hansford Johnson – Cork Street, Next to the Hatters
- Bel Kaufman – Up the Down Staircase
- Danilo Kiš – Garden, Ashes (Bašta, pepeo)
- Pierre Klossowski – Le Baphomet
- Jerzy Kosinski – The Painted Bird
- John le Carré – The Looking-Glass War
- J. M. G. Le Clézio – Le Livre des fuites
- David Lodge – The British Museum Is Falling Down
- H. P. Lovecraft – Dagon and Other Macabre Tales
- John D. MacDonald – A Deadly Shade of Gold
- Compton Mackenzie – The Stolen Soprano
- Norman Mailer – An American Dream
- Eric Malpass – Morning's at Seven
- James Mayo – Let Sleeping Girls Lie
- James A. Michener – The Source
- Gladys Mitchell – Pageant of Murder
- Mudrooroo (also as Colin Johnson) – Wild Cat Falling
- Iris Murdoch – The Red and the Green
- Ngũgĩ wa Thiong'o (also as James Ngigi) – The River Between
- Peter O'Donnell – Modesty Blaise
- J. B. Priestley – Lost Empires
- Raymond Queneau – Les fleurs bleues
- Françoise Sagan – La Chamade
- Ernst von Salomon – Die schöne Wilhelmine
- Muriel Spark – The Mandelbaum Gate
- Vincent Starrett – The Quick and the Dead (collection)
- Irving Stone – Those Who Love
- Rex Stout – The Doorbell Rang
- Julian Symons – The Belting Inheritance
- Benjamin Tammuz – חיי אליקום (Hayei Elyakum, The Life of Elyakum)
- Jesús Torbado – Las corrupciones
- Jack Vance – Space Opera
- Erico Verissimo – O Senhor Embaixador
- Arved Viirlaid – Sadu jõkke (Rain for the River)
- Ion Vinea – Lunatecii (The Lunatics, posthumous)
- Stephen Vizinczey – In Praise of Older Women: the amorous recollections of András Vajda
- Kurt Vonnegut – God Bless You, Mr. Rosewater
- Donald Wandrei – Strange Harvest
- Marguerite Young – Miss MacIntosh, My Darling

=== Children and young people ===
- Dr. Seuss – Fox in Socks
- Lloyd Alexander – The Black Cauldron
- Rev. W. Awdry – Very Old Engines (twentieth in The Railway Series of 42 books by him and his son Christopher Awdry)
- Kir Bulychov – A Girl Nothing Can Happen To (Russian: Девочка, с которой ничего не случится), the first work of literature about Alisa Selezneva
- Thora Colson – Rinkin of Dragon's Wood
- Susan Cooper – Over Sea, Under Stone (first in the Dark is Rising sequence of five books)
- Ruth Manning-Sanders – A Book of Dragons
- Constantin S. Nicolăescu-Plopșor – Tivisoc și Tivismoc
- Ruth Park – The Muddle-Headed Wombat in the Treetops
- Bill Peet
  - Chester the Worldly Pig
  - Kermit the Hermit
- John Rowe Townsend – Widdershins Crescent

=== Drama ===
- Alan Ayckbourn – Relatively Speaking (as Meet my Father)
- Samuel Beckett – Come and Go
- Edward Bond – Saved
- David Halliwell – Little Malcolm And His Struggle Against The Eunuchs
- John B. Keane – The Field
- Frank Marcus – The Killing of Sister George
- Sławomir Mrożek – Tango
- John Osborne – A Patriot for Me
- Nelson Rodrigues – Toda Nudez Será Castigada (All Nudity Shall Be Punished)
- Michel Tremblay – Les Belles-Sœurs
- Peter Weiss – The Investigation (Die Ermittlung)
- Charles Wood – Meals on Wheels

=== Poetry ===
- Stanley McNail – Something Breathing
- Sylvia Plath (suicide 1963) – Ariel
- Clark Ashton Smith – Poems in Prose

=== Non-fiction ===
- Dean Acheson – Morning and Noon
- Nelson Algren – Notes from a Sea Diary: Hemingway All the Way (travel book)
- Dmitri Borgmann – Language on Vacation
- Nirad C. Chaudhuri – The Continent of Circe
- Allen G. Debus – The English Paracelsians.
- Richard Feynman – The Character of Physical Law
- Barney Glaser and Anselm Strauss – Awareness of Dying
- William Golding – The Hot Gates
- Alex Haley and Malcolm X – The Autobiography of Malcolm X
- Pauline Kael – I Lost It at the Movies
- Peter Laslett – The World We Have Lost: England before the Industrial Age
- H. P. Lovecraft – Selected Letters I (1911–1924)
- P. J. Marshall – The Impeachment of Warren Hastings
- Robin Moore – The Green Berets
- Ralph Nader - Unsafe at Any Speed: The Designed-In Dangers of the American Automobile
- Dan Simonescu – Romanul popular în literatura română medievală (Folk Novels in Medieval Romanian Literature)
- Tamara Talbot Rice – Ancient Arts of Central Asia
- Tom Wolfe – The Kandy-Kolored Tangerine-Flake Streamline Baby

== Births ==
- February 1 – Louise Welsh, British writer of psychological thrillers
- February 20 – Philip Hensher, English fiction writer, critic and editor
- February 28 – Colum McCann, Irish writer of literary fiction
- March 4
  - Andrew Collins, English journalist and scriptwriter
  - Anisul Hoque, Bangladeshi novelist, dramatist and journalist
- March 30 – Piers Morgan, English journalist and editor
- May 14 - Eoin Colfer, Irish children's books author
- June 2 – Sean Stewart, American-Canadian author
- June 22 – Gamal Abdul Nasir Zakaria, Indonesian lecturer and writer
- July 7 – Zoë Heller, English novelist
- July 31 – J. K. Rowling, English children's novelist
- August 1 – Sam Mendes, English theatre and film director
- September 29 – Nikolaj Frobenius, Norwegian novelist
- October 23 – Augusten Burroughs, American memoirist
- November 28 – Erwin Mortier, Belgian poet, novelist and translator writing in Flemish/Dutch
- November 29 – Lauren Child, English children's fiction writer and illustrator
- December 14 – Helle Helle, Danish novelist
- December 31 – Nicholas Sparks, American novelist
- unknown dates
  - Patience Agbabi, British performance poet
  - Mike McCormack, Irish fiction writer
  - Keith Mansfield, English novelist and publisher
  - Yishai Sarid, Israeli novelist and lawyer
  - Charlotte Wood, Australian novelist

== Deaths ==
- January 4 – T. S. Eliot, American-born English poet and dramatist (born 1888)
- January 12 – Lorraine Hansberry, American journalist and dramatist (cancer, born 1930)
- March 13 – Fan S. Noli, Albanian bishop and poet (born 1882)
- May 3 – Howard Spring, Welsh-born novelist and writer (born 1889)
- May 5 – Edgar Mittelholzer, Guyanese-born novelist (suicide, born 1909)
- May 19 – Maria Dąbrowska, Polish novelist, essayist and playwright (born 1889)
- June 5
  - Thornton Burgess, American children's author (born 1874)
  - Eleanor Farjeon, English children's writer and poet (born 1881)
- June 13 – Martin Buber, Austrian-born Jewish philosopher (born 1878)
- July 8 – Thomas Sigismund Stribling, American novelist (born 1881)
- July 9 – Jacques Audiberti, French Absurdist dramatist, poet and novelist (born 1899)
- July 28 – Rampo Edogawa (江戸川 乱歩, Taro Hirai), Japanese author and critic (born 1894)
- July 30 – Jun'ichirō Tanizaki (谷崎 潤一郎), Japanese novelist (born 1888)
- July 31 – John Metcalfe, English novelist and short story writer (born 1891)
- August 1 – Percy Lubbock, English essayist, critic and biographer (born 1879)
- August 6 – Aksel Sandemose, Danish novelist (born 1899)
- August 8 – Shirley Jackson, American horror novelist and short story writer (born 1916)
- August 17 – Jack Spicer, American poet (alcohol-related, born 1925)
- September 17 – John Davy Hayward, English literary editor and bibliophile (born 1905)
- October 8 – Thomas B. Costain, Canadian popular historian (born 1885)
- October 15 – Randall Jarrell, American poet (road accident, born 1914)
- October 30 – Arthur Schlesinger, Sr., American historian (born 1888)
- November 8 – Dorothy Kilgallen, American journalist (alcohol/drug overdose, born 1913)
- November 20 – Katharine Anthony, American biographer (born 1877)
- November 24 – Betty Miller, Irish-born Jewish writer (born 1910)
- December 16 – W. Somerset Maugham English novelist, dramatist and short story writer (born 1874)

== Awards ==
- Nobel Prize in Literature – Michail Aleksandrovich Sholokhov

=== Canada ===
- See 1965 Governor General's Awards for a complete list of winners and finalists for those awards.

=== France ===
- Prix Goncourt: J. Borel, L'Adoration
- Prix Médicis: René-Victor Pilhes, La Rhubarbe

=== United Kingdom ===
- Carnegie Medal for children's literature: Philip Turner, The Grange at High Force
- Eric Gregory Award: John Fuller, Derek Mahon, Michael Longley, Norman Talbot
- Newdigate prize: Peter Jay
- James Tait Black Memorial Prize for fiction: Muriel Spark, The Mandelbaum Gate
- James Tait Black Memorial Prize for biography: Mary Moorman, William Wordsworth: The Later Years 1803–1850
- Queen's Gold Medal for Poetry: Philip Larkin

=== United States ===
- American Academy of Arts and Letters Gold Medal for Criticism: Walter Lippmann
- Hugo Award: Fritz Leiber, The Wanderer
- Nebula Award: Frank Herbert, Dune
- Newbery Medal for children's literature: Maia Wojciechowska, Shadow of a Bull
- Pulitzer Prize for Drama: Frank D. Gilroy, The Subject Was Roses
- Pulitzer Prize for Fiction: Shirley Ann Grau – The Keepers Of The House
- Pulitzer Prize for Poetry: John Berryman: 77 Dream Songs

=== Elsewhere ===
- Friedenspreis des Deutschen Buchhandels: Nelly Sachs
- Miles Franklin Award: Thea Astley, The Slow Natives
- Alfaguara Prize: Jesús Torbado, Las corrupciones
- Premio Nadal: E. Cabalero Calderón, El buen salvaje
- Viareggio Prize: Goffredo Parise, Il Padrone (The Boss)
