= Oxford Children's Library =

Series of children's books

The Oxford Children's Library was a reprint series of children's books published by the Oxford University Press from 1958 to 1974.

The series was announced "not so much as an invasion of the cheap market but as a lifeline thrown out to save a number of books (most of them post-war publications) from going prematurely out of print: those books that have proved themselves already at a higher price but can only now be reprinted in a normal sized edition at a price that would be prohibitive"

== List of titles in the series ==
Number	Author	Year	Title	Illustrator
1	Tring, A. Stephen	1958	The Old Gang	
2	Gleit, Maria	1958	Child of China. Translated by E. F. Peeler	Walter Holz
3	Smith, C. Fox	1958	The Ship Aground	C. Walter Hodges
4	Sutcliff, Rosemary	1958	The Queen Elizabeth Story	C. Walter Hodges
5	Chauncy, Nan	1958	They Found a Cave	
6	Chauncy, Nan	1958	World's End was Home	
7	Dawlish, Peter	1958	Aztec Gold	P. A. Jobson
8	Mayne, William	1958	Follow the Footprints	Shirley Hughes
9	Higson, Kit	1958	Cop Shooter	Dorothy Fitch
10	Spring, Howard	1958	Darkie and Co.	Norman Hepple
11	Welch, Ronald	1958	The Gauntlet	T. R. Freeman
12	Carruthers, Janet	1958	The Forest is my Kingdom	
13	Vipont, Charles	1958	The Heir of Craigs	
14	Forbes-Watson, R.	1958	Shifta!	Joan Kiddell-Monroe
15	Mayne, William	1958	The World Upside Down	Shirley Hughes
16	Berg, Leila	1958	The Adventures of Chunky	George Downs
17	Abrahall, C. H.	1959	Prelude	Anna Zinkeisen
18	Tarn, W. W.	1959	The Treasure of the Isle of Mist	
19	Yonge, Charlotte M.		The Little Duke	Jennifer Miles
20	Sutcliff, Rosemary		Simon	Richard Kennedy
21	Smith, C. Fox	1959	The Valiant Sailor	Neville Dear
22	Vipont, Elfrida	1959	The Lark in the Morn	T. R. Freeman
23	Forbes-Watson, R.	1961	Ambari!	Joan Kiddell-Monroe
24	Sutcliff, Rosemary	1961	Brother Dusty-Feet	C. Walter Hodges
25	Mayne, William	1962	A Swarm in May	
26	Jowett, Margaret	1962	Candidate for Fame	Peggy Fortnum
27	Sutcliff, Rosemary	1962	The Armourer's House	C. Walter Hodges
28	Farjeon, Eleanor	1962	The Glass Slipper	Ernest H. Shepard
29	Lee, M. and C.	1963	Rosamond Fane	Heather Standring
30	Guillot, René		The Wind of Chance. Translated by Norman Dale	Pierre Collot
31	Voegeli, Max	1963	The Wonderful Lamp. Translated by E. M. Prince.	Felix Hoffmann
32	Pertwee, Roland	1965	Rough Water	Margery Gill
33	Mayne, William	1965	Underground Alley	Marcia Lane Foster
34	Lewis, Hilda		The Ship That Flew	
35	Smith, C. Fox	1965	Painted Ports	C. Walter Hodges
36	Guillot, René		The Sea Rover	
37	Lewis, Hilda		The Gentle Falcon	
38	Grice, Frederick	1966	The Bonny Pit Laddie	Brian Wildsmith
39	Guillot, René	1966	Sama. Translated by Gwen Marsh.	Joan Kiddell-Monroe
40	Manning-Saunders, Ruth	1967	Animal Stories	Annette Macarthur-Onslow
41	Pertweel, Roland	1967	The Islanders	
42	Guillot, René		Kpo the Leopard. Translated by Gwen Marsh.	Joan Kiddell-Monroe
43	Manning-Saunders, Ruth	1967	Circus Boy	Annette Macarthur-Onslow
44	Braumann, Franz		Gold in the Taiga	
45	Guillot, René		Companions of Fortune	
46	Bosco, Henri	1967	The Boy and the River. Translated by Gerald Hopkins	Lynton Lamb
47	Guillot, René	1968	Prince of the Jungle. Translated by Brian Rhys.	Brian Wildsmith
48	Guillot, René		Elephants of Sargabal. Translated by Gwen Marsh	
49	Allen, Eric	1968	The Latchkey Children	Charles Keeping
50	Hagen, Victor V. and Hawkins, Quail	1968	Quetzal Quest	Antonio Sotomayor
51	Welch, Ronald		For the King	William Stobbs
52	Burton, Hester		The Great Gale	Joan Kiddell-Monroe
53	Welch, Ronald		Escape from France	William Stobbs
54	Guillot, René		Master of the Elephants. Translated by Barbara Seccombe.	Victor G. Ambrus
55	Welch, Ronald	1969	Captain of Foot	William Stobbs
56	Farjeon, Eleanor	1969	The Silver Curlew	Ernest H. Shepard
58	Curcija-Prodanovic, Nada	1970	Ballerina	Dusan Ristic
59	Turner, Philip	1970	The Grange at High Force	William Papas
60	Vipont, Elfrida	1970	The Lark on the Wing	T. R. Freeman
61	Porter, Sheena	1970	The bronze chrysanthemum	Shirley Hughes
62	Baumann, Hans	1970	The Barque of the Brothers. Translated by Florence McHugh	Ulrik Schramm
63	Michael, Manfred	1970	Timpetill. Translated by R. P. Aston.	Richard Kennedy
64	Pearce, Philippa	1974	Minnow on the Say	Edward Ardizzone
65	Welch, Ronald	1974	Captain of Dragoons	William Stobbs
66	Sutcliff, Rosemary	1974	Knight's Fee	Charles Keeping
