= Late bloomer =

Individuals who take time to discover themselves

A late bloomer is a person whose talents or capabilities are not visible to others until later than usual. The term is used metaphorically to describe a child or adolescent who develops slower than others in their age group, but eventually catches up and in some cases overtakes their peers, or an adult whose talent or genius in a particular field only appears later in life than is normal – in some cases only in old age.

== Children ==
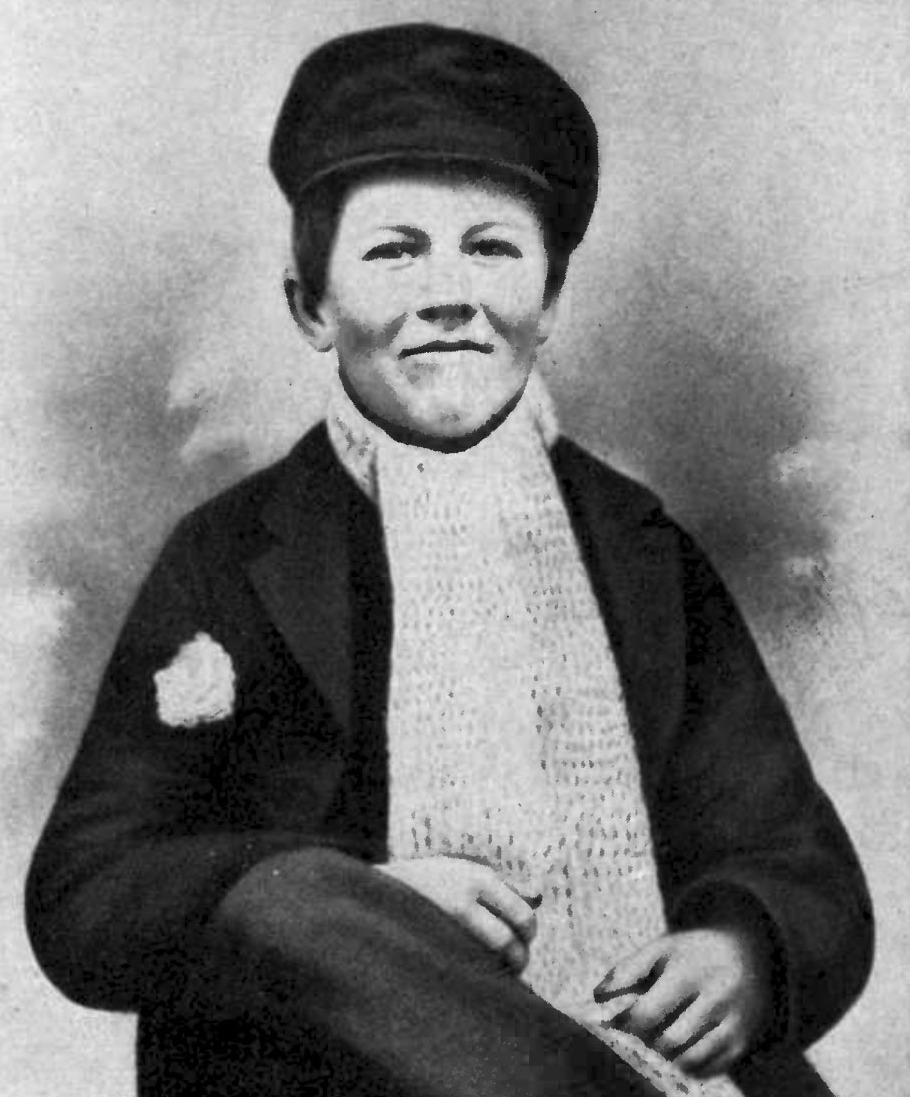
Thomas Edison as a boy

There are many theories of the way in which children develop, proposed by authorities such as Urie Bronfenbrenner, Jerome Bruner, Erik Erikson, Jerome Kagan, Lawrence Kohlberg, Jean Piaget, and Lev Vygotsky. Although they disagree about how stages of development should be defined, and about the primary influences on development, they agree that a child's development can be measured as a predictable series of advances in physical, intellectual and social skills which almost always occur in the same sequence, although the rate may vary from one child to another.

When a child falls behind their peers at some stage of development, their teacher may perceive that the child is "backward". There is strong evidence that this perception may become self-fulfilling: although the child catches up, the teacher may continue to rate their performance poorly, imposing a long-term handicap. Thomas Edison's mind often wandered and his teacher was overheard calling him "addled." This ended Edison's three months of official schooling. His mother then home schooled him. Edison may have had some form of Attention-deficit hyperactivity disorder (ADHD), which the American Psychiatric Institute says affects about 3–5% of children.

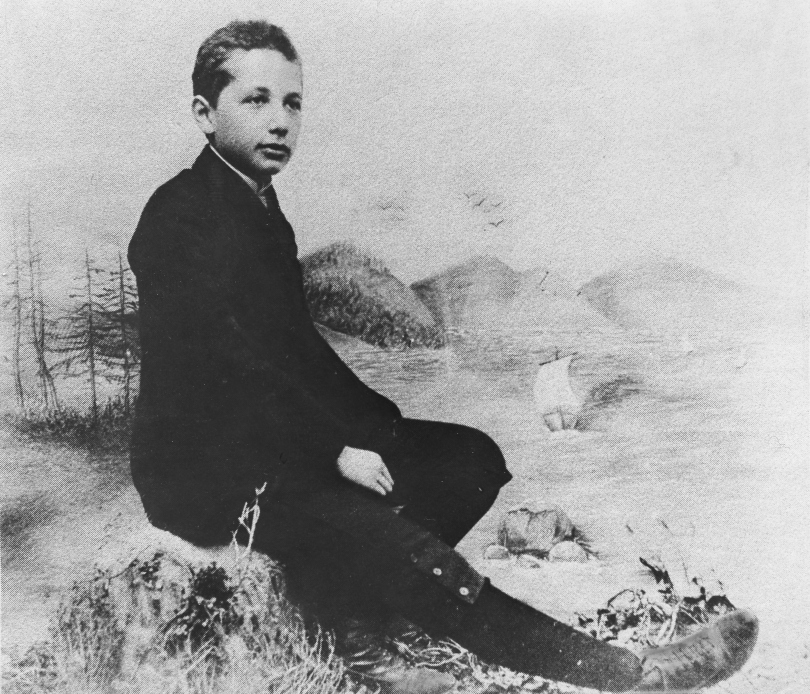
Albert Einstein in 1893 (age 14)

A notable example of a child who overcame early developmental problems is Albert Einstein, who suffered from speech difficulties as a young child. Other late-talking children who became highly-successful engineers, mathematicians, and scientists include the physicists Richard Feynman and Edward Teller. Neuroscientist Steven Pinker postulates that a certain form of language delay may in fact be associated with exceptional and innate-analytical prowess in some individuals.

Dyslexia is a learning disability that may affect 3–10% of children. It is thought to be the result of a genetically inherited neurological difference from "normal" children, and has been diagnosed in people of all levels of intelligence. Studies indicate that 20% to 35% of U.S. and British entrepreneurs have the condition: by definition, late bloomers. Researchers theorise that dyslexic entrepreneurs may attain success by delegating responsibilities and excelling at verbal communication. Richard Branson, known for his Virgin brand of over 360 companies is a notable example, as is Charles R. Schwab the founder and CEO of the Charles Schwab Corporation. Pablo Picasso, Tom Cruise, and Whoopi Goldberg are other examples of dyslexics, considered "slow" as children.

The autism spectrum of psychological conditions affects about 0.6% of children, characterized by widespread abnormalities of social interactions and communication, severely-restricted interests, and highly-repetitive behavior. Notable individuals with autism spectrum disorders include Tim Page, a Pulitzer Prize-winning critic and author and Vernon L. Smith, a Nobel Laureate in economics.

== Adolescents ==
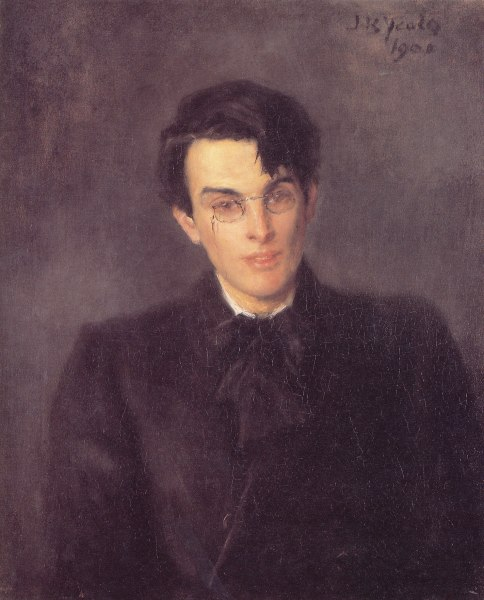
Portrait of young William Butler Yeats by his father, John Butler Yeats

During adolescence a youth goes through physical and mental changes that lead to them becoming an adult. Adolescence is usually considered to start with the first stages of puberty and to continue until physical growth is complete, although the World Health Organization defines adolescence simply as the period between ages 10 and 20. There is a wide range of normal ages, but generally girls begin the process of puberty between the ages of 8 and 13, while boys usually start between the ages of 9 and 14. The entire process of puberty typically takes up to 4 years, with girls usually finishing around age 14, and boys at age 15–16.

"Late bloomer" can refer to children who suffer from delayed puberty, who are late in reaching their full height. W. B. Yeats (age 30) and Pierre Trudeau (age at least 28), are all "late bloomers" in this last sense.

In most public educational systems, children and adolescents of the same age are put in the same classes. Because of the wide variance in the onset of adolescence, this means that one class may include individuals who have not yet started puberty, others who are sexually mature but not fully grown and yet others who are effectively adult. During this period, there is a high risk of an adolescent dropping out of formal education (due most commonly to laziness, intellectual boredom, bullying, or rebellion) without having achieved their full learning potential. The term "late-bloomer" may refer to such an individual who develops serious intellectual interests in their 20s or 30s and enrolls in college, where he or she performs particularly well and subsequently establishes a professional career.

== Adults ==
A late blooming adult is a person who does not discover their talents and abilities until later than normally expected. In certain cases retirement may lead to this discovery.

Although there is a common perception that intellectual development peaks in a young adult and then slowly declines with increasing age, this may be simplistic. Although the ability to form new memories and concepts may indeed diminish, the older person has the advantage of accumulated knowledge, associations between concepts, and mental techniques that may give them an advantage in some fields.

Some notable examples of late bloomers in different fields follow.

=== Acting ===
It is common for many actors to not get their big 'break' into the film industry until their late twenties or well into their thirties. Meryl Streep did not graduate Yale School of Drama until the age of twenty-seven. The actor Alan Rickman did not begin his career until he was twenty-eight, having operated a graphic-design company before then. He did not get his first real break into theatre until he was in his forties. Danny Aiello did not start acting until he was forty. Peg Phillips might be one of the best examples as she first pursued acting as a professional after her retirement from accounting; she started acting professionally in her late sixties. Although not a noteworthy actress, Clara Peller might be noted for having an even later start in entertainment, in her eighties. Richard Farnsworth became an actor after forty years as a stunt man, although he had had a few small uncredited roles when younger. Ellen Albertini Dow obtained her first screen credit when she was sixty-eight. Rodney Dangerfield was an actor/comedian who did not really start until he was forty-two. He had done clubs when he was younger, but stopped in order to work as a salesman. Zelda Rubinstein was forty-eight before she had her first role, a minor part in Under the Rainbow, but is more known for her "debut" in the Poltergeist film series starting the following year. Chicago native Chi McBride, best known for the role as the principal in the series Boston Public, only got into acting when he was thirty-one. Danny Glover had a brief stint in the career of politics before he had involved himself in acting at twenty-eight. BAFTA winning British actress Liz Smith did not become a professional actress until the age of fifty. Kathryn Joosten also got a late start, beginning acting at age forty-two in community theater. Television star Judd Hirsch from Taxi and character actor Bill Cobbs became active at the age of thirty-six. George Wendt who played Norm on Cheers became active at the age of thirty-two. Brian Dennehy had dreams of stage and screen at an early age, but chose to first pursue other interests such as service in the U.S. Marine Corps prior to becoming active at the age of thirty-eight. Irish actor Brendan Gleeson, who appeared as Mad Eye Moody in the Harry Potter films and alongside Colin Farrell in In Bruges, started acting professionally at thirty-four, having previous work as a school teacher. The Indian (Bengali) actor Paran Bandopadhyay is another late bloomer, who started his acting career in television and films at the age of sixty, after retiring from his government job. Jerry Doyle, of Babylon 5 fame, did not start acting until he was thirty-six after working as a stockbroker and pilot. Sylvester Stallone was thirty when he wrote and starred in the first Rocky. All throughout his life, he has pushed his body through rigorous training routines for his film roles. Most notably at age forty-three, he developed his now-famous Rambo 3 physique which got him named as "body of the '80s". The veteran Indian (Malayalam) actor Sathyan started his career at the age of forty, after resigning from the Police Service. He later came to be known as one of the greatest Malayalam film actors, and the actor Thilakan did not have much success until he was well into his forties, despite having started his film career at the age of thirty-seven after having worked in a drama troupe.

=== Art ===
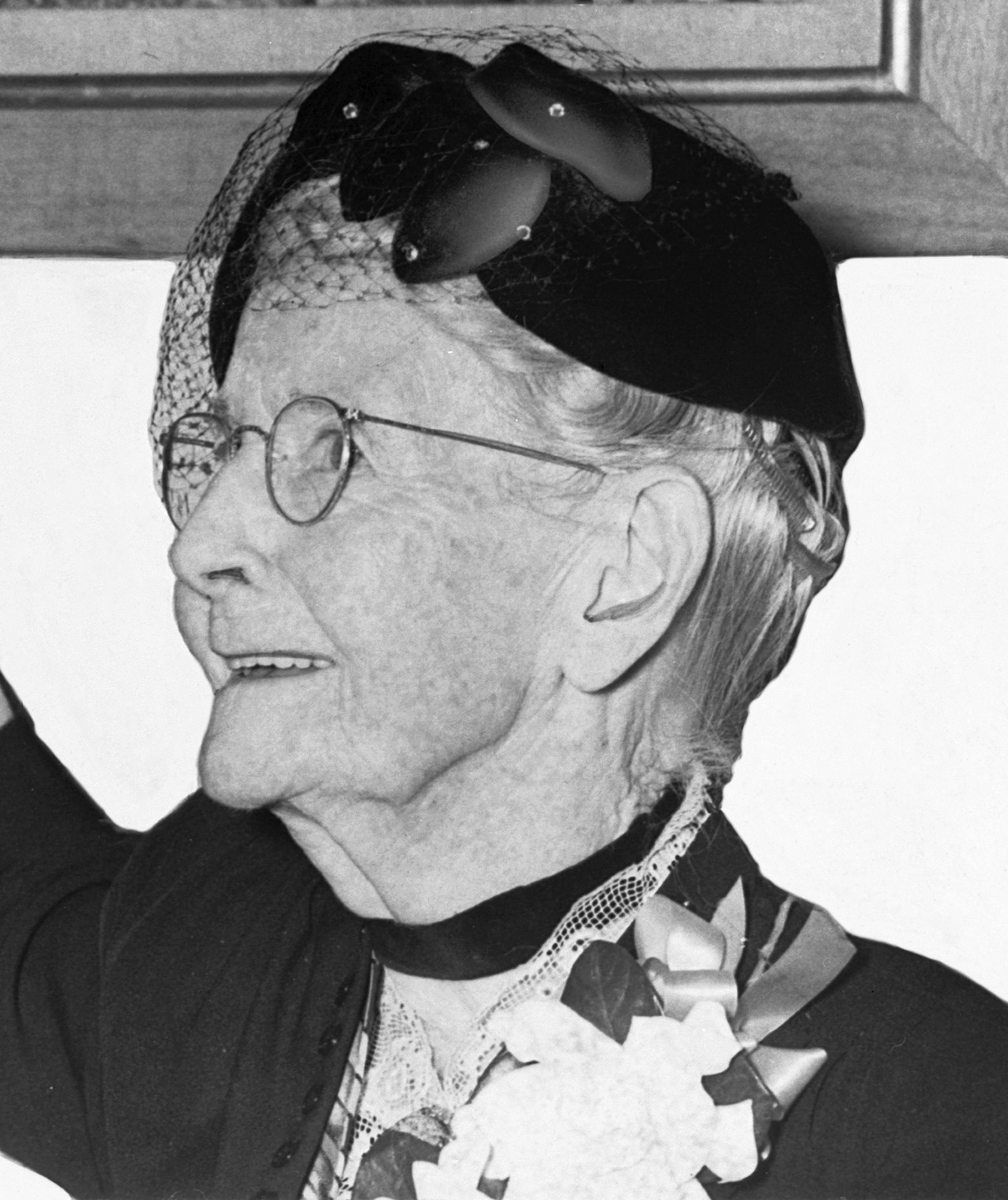
Grandma Moses

In art, "late bloomers" are most often associated with naïve art. This term is used for untrained artists, and so fits those who start later in life without artistic training. Hence the classic late bloomer is Grandma Moses whose painting career began in her seventies after abandoning a career in embroidery because of arthritis. There is also Janet Sobel, a painter whose career started mid-life, at age forty-five. Beryl Cook is another example; she had no artistic training and did not become a serious painter until her forties. An older example is Bill Traylor who started drawing at age 83. Another painter who started late in life is Alfred Wallis, who began painting after his wife's death in his 60s. Mary Delany produced her "paper mosaiks [sic]" from the age of 71 to 88. Jesse Aaron began working as a sculptor at age 81.

Vincent van Gogh (March 1853 – 29 July 1890) was a Dutch post-impressionist painter who posthumously became one of the most famous and influential figures in the history of Western art. In a decade, he created about 2,100 artworks, including around 860 oil paintings, most of which date from the last two years of his life.

=== Business ===
In business Irene Wells Pennington became best known in her nineties when she helped straighten out irregularities in her husband's oil business after he went senile in his own 90s. Colonel Sanders began his franchise in his sixties and can also be deemed a late in life financial success. In his mid-50s Taikichiro Mori founded the business that made him, for a year or two, the richest man in the world. He came from a merchant family, but had been a business professor before his 50s.

=== Dance ===
Misty Copeland was considered a prodigy who rose to stardom despite not starting ballet until the age of 13. Japanese dancer and choreographer Kazuo Ohno did not undertake formal dance lessons until his late twenties and was 43 years old when he performed his first recital at Kanda Kyoritsu Hall in Tokyo in 1949. A decade later, he and colleague Tatsumi Hijikata would achieve worldwide acclaim as the nucleus of the Butoh dance movement. Martha Graham dancer David Zurak took his first dance class at the age of 23 and built a successful career in New York City.

=== Games and sports ===
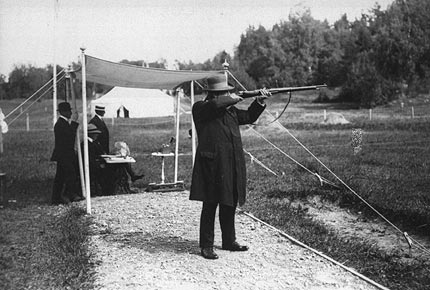
Oscar Swahn at the 1912 Olympic Games, aged 64

In athletics Philip Rabinowitz set a sprinting record for centenarians. As well, Ida Keeling began running in her late sixties, and among other accomplishments on April 30, 2016 became the first woman in history to complete a 100-meter run at the age of 100. Her time of 1:17.33 was witnessed by a crowd of 44,469 at the 2016 Penn Relays.

In basketball, Hakeem Olajuwon did not touch a basketball until he was 15, but his athleticism and fundamentals from the sports, football and handball, helped him advance as one of the greatest bigmen to ever play in the NBA.

In baseball Josh Hamilton, a former number one overall draft pick, did not make his major league debut until the age of 26 due to years of serious drug and alcohol abuse. He was an all star several times and won the 2010 American League MVP award. A few pitchers who are members of the Baseball Hall of Fame are examples: Dazzy Vance did not win his first major league game until he was 31, but then became the most dominant pitcher in the National League for the next decade. Hoyt Wilhelm was already 29 when he first played in the majors, but by the time he retired, at 49, he had set a record for most games pitched with 1,070 and had gained recognition as one of the greatest relief pitchers ever. Among contemporary players, Edwin Encarnacion and Jose Bautista have both been described as late bloomers because they both had completely unremarkable careers until they each reached the age of 29, after which they turned into prodigious sluggers. Pitcher Randy Johnson, who made his Major League debut at 25, but did not reach superstar status until he was 30, might also be considered a late bloomer.

In boxing, heavyweight champions Ken Norton and Rocky Marciano did not take up boxing until their twenties, but both enjoyed successful careers at the highest level of competition.

In chess, Rani Hamid started playing at the age of 34, and later became Bangladesh’s first Woman International Master in 1985, among other accomplishments.

In cricket, Dirk Nannes who once was played for Delhi Daredevils ahead of the great fast bowler Glenn McGrath made his first class debut at 29.

In field hockey, the great player Dhyan Chand did not play any hockey in his life until he joined the Indian Army.

In football, Kurt Warner, who entered the NFL at age 28, went on to become a two-time MVP and Super Bowl champion. Nigerian fullback Christian Okoye can also be considered a late bloomer, as he would have never played football at any level until the age of 23 and would lead the NFL in rushing yards in 1989 at age 28, being the first player in Kansas City Chiefs history to do so.

In mixed martial arts, Francis Ngannou began as a professional fighter in 2013 at the age of 27, and two years later he would sign with the Ultimate Fighting Championship (UFC) promotion, where he obtained a 12–2 record and won the UFC Heavyweight Championship at the age of 35. All this in less than a decade and after having overcome extreme poverty.

In ice hockey, Tim Thomas, an American professional ice hockey goaltender played for several years in the minor leagues and Europe, before making it to the NHL at age 28, with the Boston Bruins. He finally emerged as the Bruins' starting goaltender at age 32. Thomas is a two-time winner of the Vezina Trophy (2009 and 2011) as the league's best goaltender, and was a member of Team USA in the 2010 Winter Olympics in Vancouver. Thomas won the Conn Smythe Trophy as the most valuable player in the 2011 Stanley Cup playoffs. He became the oldest player in league history to win the Conn Smythe at age 37.

In shooting, there have been two figures of note whose accomplishments occurred in their sixties or later. Joshua Millner of Britain was 61 when he won his Olympic gold medal in Free rifle, 1,000 yards. Swedish marksman Oscar Swahn won two Olympic gold medals at the age of 60 and one at the age of 64. He won his last medal, silver, at 72 making him the oldest medalist.

In squash, Jonah Barrington overcame alcoholism to later become a six times British Open Squash champion, and was regarded as one of the fittest men on the planet.

In tennis, some famous late bloomers are Angelique Kerber, Li Na, Stan Wawrinka, Francesca Schiavone, Flavia Pennetta, Jana Novotna, Goran Ivanišević and Andrés Gómez, who all won their Grand Slam Singles titles after age 28.

==== Association football ====
Didier Drogba did not sign a professional contract with a club until the age of 21. It was not until the age of 26, when he joined Chelsea, that he showed his real talent as a world-class player. Drogba scored the equaliser, and then the winning penalty, in the 2012 UEFA Champions League final at the age of 34.

Jamie Vardy was twenty-five years old when he made his English Football League debut. He has since made over four-hundred football league appearances for Leicester City, was part of their 2015/16 Premier League winning side, won the Premier League Golden Boot and has made 26 appearances for the England national football team.

Oribe Peralta debuted at 19 years old playing for Monarcas Morelia, but it wasn't until he was 26 that he began to shine at Santos Laguna, where he established himself as the club's main star, winning the Clausura 2008 and Clausura 2012 tournaments, in addition to playing in two CONCACAF Champions Cup finals. In 2012, at 28 years old, he was a key player in Mexico's gold medal victory in football at the London Olympic Games, where he scored the fastest goal in a final of that tournament. Later, at the age of 30, he played his first (and only) FIFA World Cup in 2014, and months later, he signed for Club América.

The career of Junior Messias is one of the most incredible in football history. Messias come back to football in the early 2010s, starting at amateur level through Unione Italiana Sport Per tutti. A few years later, he became a professional footballer and was even able to score on his debut, a match-winning goal in the Champions League, at the age of 30 while he was on loan at AC Milan.

Although he played a few matches for the U-16 and U-21 Portuguese national team, Pauleta is considered a late bloomer in terms of his development as a player. He made his debut in the First Division and the national team at the age 24, and went on to become the top goalscorer for Portugal. He scored his first two goals for the national team at the age of 26.

=== Mathematics ===
June Huh, a high school dropout and amateur poet who started to study mathematics seriously at age 24, was later awarded the Fields Medal in 2022.

Leonardo da Vinci did not apply himself to higher mathematics until he was between 30-40 years old.

George Green, working as a miller and with no formal education in mathematics, published his famous An Essay on the Application of Mathematical Analysis to the Theories of Electricity and Magnetism in 1828, at the age of 35.

Alexandre-Théophile Vandermonde started to study mathematics at 35, and began to publish in this field the same year.

Eugène Ehrhart started publishing in mathematics in his 40s, and finished his PhD thesis at the age of 60.

Marjorie Rice, an amateur mathematician with no formal education in mathematics beyond high school, born in 1923, discovered four new types of tessellating pentagons in 1976 and 1977, in her fifties.

Caspar Wessel published his only mathematics paper at the age of 54.

Yitang Zhang submitted a paper to the Annals of Mathematics in 2013, at the age of 58, which established the first finite bound on the least gap between consecutive primes that is attained infinitely often. This work led to a 2013 Ostrowski Prize, a 2014 Cole Prize, a 2014 Rolf Schock Prize, and a 2014 MacArthur Fellowship. Zhang became a professor of mathematics at the University of California, Santa Barbara in fall 2015.

Roger Apéry proved Apéry's theorem at the age of 63.

=== Music ===
Musical ability is inherent in almost all people, to a greater or lesser extent. However, those who develop it to a high level are generally encouraged to play an instrument or to sing at an early age. Late bloomers in music are generally composers or artists who became prominent later in life, but had displayed musical ability much earlier.

Anton Bruckner is an example of a musical late bloomer. Although he played church organ some in his twenties he did not become a composer until his 40s. Singer K. T. Oslin released her first album at age 47 which was a major country music success. Soul musician Bill Withers is considered a late bloomer, releasing his debut album Just As I Am at the age of 33. Al Jarreau is also an example, who released his first album at age 35. AERIA Recording Artist Colie Brice released his 10th solo album Late Bloomer at 39. Elliott Carter did not achieve compositional maturity until his Cello Sonata (1948), when he was 40. César Franck and Leoš Janáček also matured late as composers: Franck at 56, with his Symphony in D minor; and Janáček at 50, with Jenůfa (1904). Iannis Xenakis did not even begin studying composition until 30, with Messiaen. Leonard Cohen did not release his first album until he was 33 years old. Doug Seegers did not reach fame until he was 61–62 years old. American composer Eric Whitacre didn't learn to read music until he was 20 years old, and composed his first piece "Go, Lovely Rose" for SATB chorus at 21.

=== Filmmaking ===
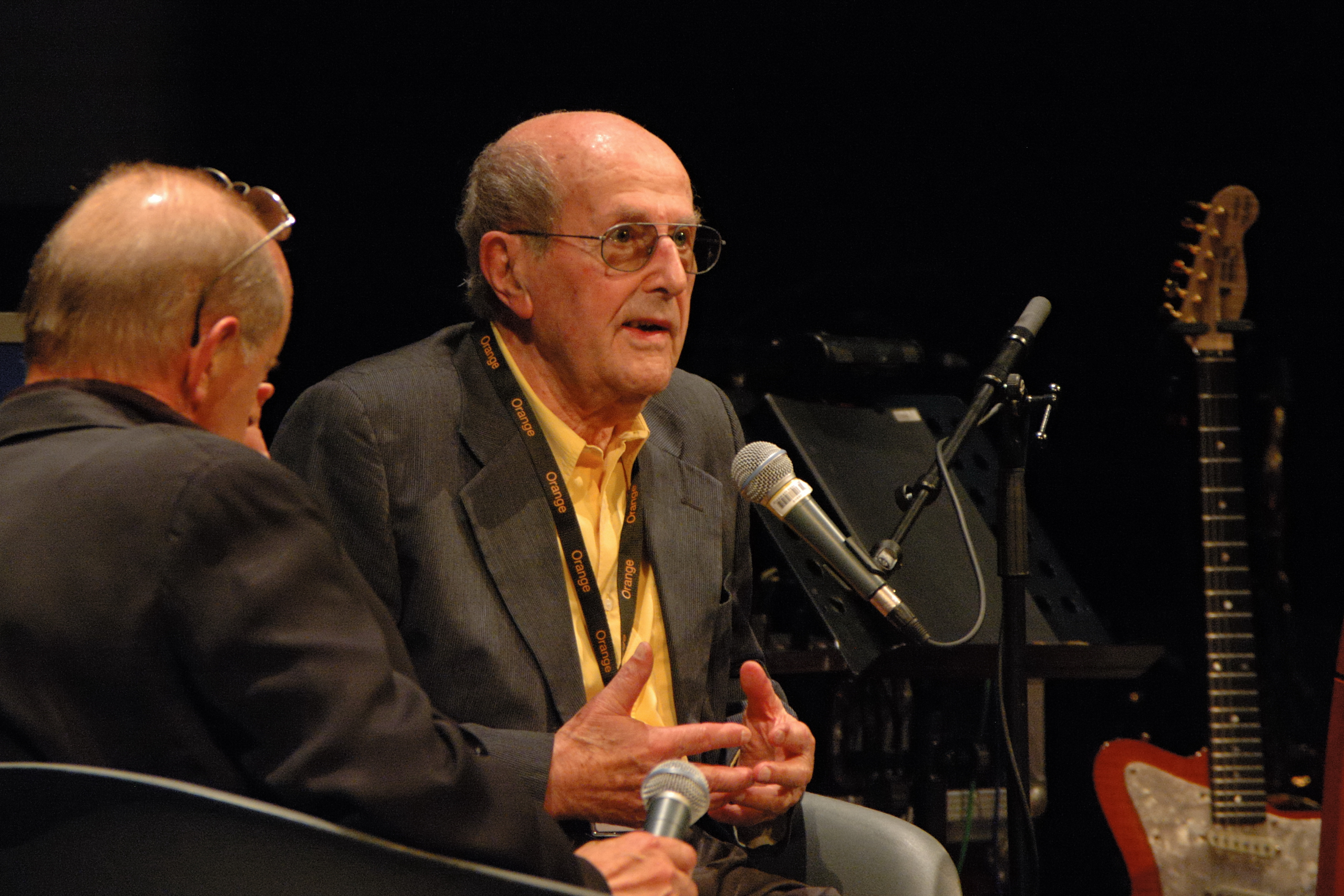
Manoel de Oliveira

Though many filmmakers begin directing in their late 20s or early 30s, many of the most notable directors in film history waited until their mid-to-late-30s to direct their first feature. These directors include Nicholas Ray, Alain Resnais, Edward Yang, Michael Mann, Frank Tashlin, Robert Aldrich, Satyajit Ray, Anthony Mann, Terry Gilliam, Jerry Lewis, Tsai Ming-liang, Don Siegel, Ridley Scott, Melvin Van Peebles, Gaspar Noé, Lloyd Bacon, Alexander Kluge, Mrinal Sen, Jean-Marie Straub, Ida Lupino, Sam Mendes, Alexander Payne, Ang Lee and Jacques Rivette. David Mamet directed his first feature at 40, having already found success and been awarded a Pulitzer Prize as a playwright. Éric Rohmer directed his first feature film at 39, though he did not become a full-time filmmaker until he was in his late 40s.

Many notable directors started even later: Robert Bresson, Jacques Tati, Brad Bird, and Takeshi Kitano directed their first features at 42; Maurice Pialat at 43; Michael Haneke at 47; Yevgeni Bauer at 48; Jim Sheridan at 40; and his peer and collaborator Terry George at 46. Clint Eastwood, the oldest person to win the Academy Award for Best Director, directed his first film at 41.

One of the most shining examples of late bloomers in filmmaking is the Portuguese director Manoel de Oliveira. Born in 1908, he worked sporadically in filmmaking from the 1930s. He completed his first feature film in 1941 called Aniki-Bobo. Due to circumstances beyond his control (difficulty in financing, having to deal with his family's business), he did not complete his second feature film until 1971 (when he turned 63). Two years later, he completed his third feature film, Benilde or the Virgin Mother (1973). Five years later, he made his breakthrough film (originally commissioned by Portuguese TV) called Doomed Love. After his critically acclaimed film Francisca (1981), he became a full-time filmmaker (at the age of 73).

=== Politics ===
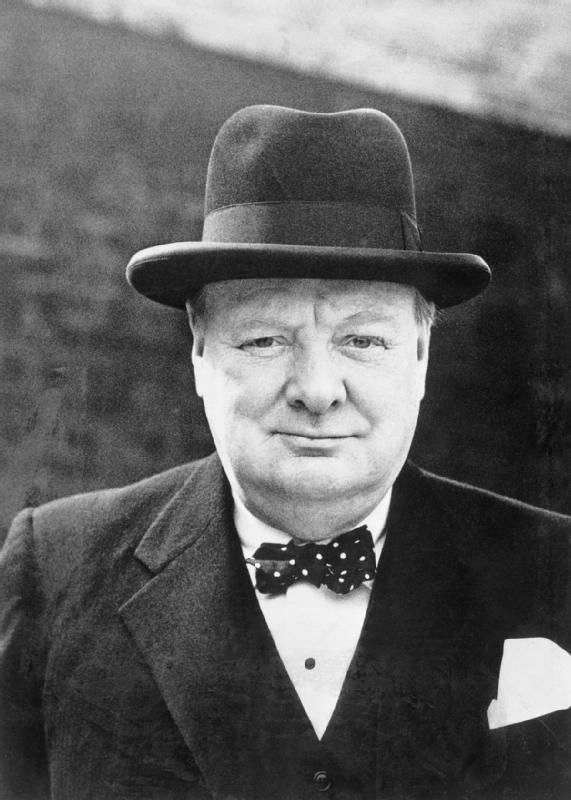
Winston Churchill performed poorly in school exams.

It is common for politicians to achieve prominence late in life, often after a career in business, law or academia. For example, in the United States Congress of January 2009, of 540 elected officials, 215 had worked in the legal profession, and 189 had worked in private sector business. The average age of senators was 62. Also, Donald Trump was the first U.S. President to reach the age of seventy prior to his election to the presidency and first to reach seventy years of age before entering office, as well as the first U.S. President to assume the office without any prior military or political experience.

Some highly successful politicians come from more unusual backgrounds.

Václav Havel, born in 1936, was a playwright and writer with an interest in human rights. He became the voice of the opposition in Czechoslovakia in the 1980s and President of Czechoslovakia at age 53 after the collapse of the communist regime in 1989. Ronald Reagan, a former actor, union leader, and corporate spokesman, was first elected to public office at 55 when he became Governor of California and was the oldest man to have served as U.S. President until Biden's presidency. Melchora Aquino was an uneducated Filipino peasant woman, the mother of six children, who became an activist in the fight to gain independence from Spain. Known as the Grand Woman of the revolution, she was 84 when the Philippine Revolution broke out in 1896. Marjory Stoneman Douglas's career also fits. Her first environmental work of note occurred when she was almost 60, at 78 she founded "Friends of the Everglades", and she continued until she was over age 100.

=== Religion ===
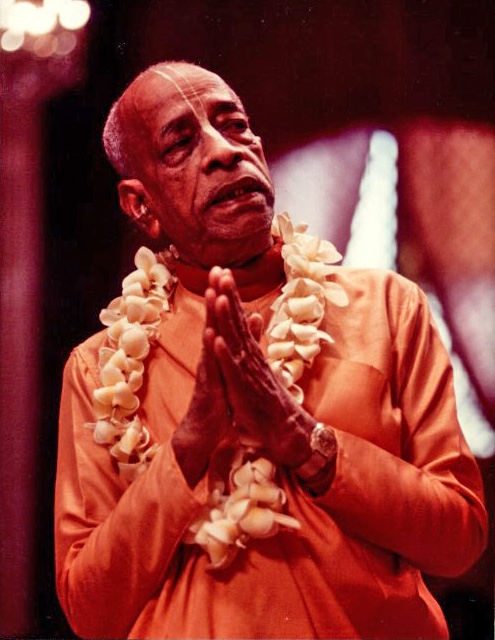
A. C. Bhaktivedanta Swami Prabhupada

A. C. Bhaktivedanta Swami Prabhupada, a proponent of Gaudiya Vaishnavism, founded the International Society for Krishna Consciousness (a.k.a. the Hare Krishna movement) in 1966 at the age of 70. Within the final fifteen years of his life, Prabhupada translated over sixty volumes of classic Vedic scriptures (such as the Bhagavad Gita and Bhagavata Purana) into the English language.

Mary Baker Eddy, born in 1821, founded The Church of Christ, Scientist in 1879 at the age of 58.

Augustine of Hippo, as he detailed in the Confessions, was a frequent loser in the battle with lustful passions from the age of 16 to 32. At the age of 31 he converted to Christianity and began to pray to overcome his passions and lust. He eventually went on to lead a life of celibacy and became one of the most influential bishops in the history of the Church.

=== Writing ===
Many writers have published their first major work late in life. Mary Wesley might be a classic example. She wrote two children's books in her late fifties, but her writing career did not gain note until her first novel at 70, written after the death of her husband. At the age of 74, Norman Maclean published his first and only novel, the 1976 best-selling book A River Runs Through It, which fictionalizes Maclean's memories of the early twentieth century in Montana. Harriet Doerr published her first novel at age 74, and went on to great praise. A possibly more well-known example might be Laura Ingalls Wilder. She became a columnist in her forties, but did not publish her first novel in the Little House series of children's books until her sixties. Charles Bukowski wrote his first novel in 1971, when he was 51 years old.

Memoirist and novelist Flora Thompson was first published in her thirties but is most famous for the semi-autobiographical Lark Rise to Candleford trilogy, the first volume of which was published when she was 63. Frank McCourt didn't publish his first book Angela's Ashes, which he later won the Pulitzer Prize for, until he was 66. Children's author Mary Alice Fontenot wrote her first book at 51 and wrote almost thirty additional books, publishing multiple volumes in her eighties and nineties. Kenneth Grahame was born in 1859 and joined the Bank of England in 1879, rising through the ranks to become its secretary. Although he had written various short stories while working at the bank, it was only after his retirement in 1908 that he published his masterpiece and final work The Wind in the Willows. Penelope Fitzgerald launched her literary career in 1975, at the age of 58, when she published a biography of the Pre-Raphaelite artist Edward Burne-Jones. She won the Booker Prize for 1979 with Offshore, and in 2012, The Observer named her final novel, The Blue Flower, as one of "the ten best historical novels".

Richard Adams's first novel, the bestseller Watership Down, was published when he was in his fifties. The Marquis de Sade published his first novel, Justine, after turning 51. Raymond Chandler published his first short story at 45, and his first novel, The Big Sleep, at 51. Paul Torday published his debut novel Salmon Fishing in the Yemen at the age of 59, after a career in the engineering industry. Jean Rhys is best known for her novel Wide Sargasso Sea, which was published in October 1966, when she was 76.

Aron Ettore Schmitz published his first novel, Senilità, in his 38th year. However, it was not until he published Zeno's Conscience that he made a breakthrough, aged 61. Even this was self-published.

In other areas of writing, historian Gerda Lerner, born in 1920, published her first book, The Grimke Sisters from South Carolina, in 1967, when she was either 47 or 46 depending on her birthday. Poet Wallace Stevens started poetry late in life after years as an insurance salesman and executive. Although he was first published at 38, his "canonical works" came out in his fifties. In philosophy Mary Midgley had her first book when she was 56. Edmond Hoyle wrote a booklet on whist in his late sixties. To avoid unauthorized copies he wrote the copyrighted A Short Treatise on the Game of Whist at age 70.

The Indian writer and polymath Nirad C. Chaudhuri wrote his autobiography The Autobiography of an Unknown Indian at the age of 54. He wrote a sequel to it Thy Hand, Great Anarch! at the age of 90. He published his next work (and his final work) Three Horsemen of the New Apocalypse at the age of 100.

Jane Juska’s first book, A Round-Heeled Woman: My Late-Life Adventures in Sex and Romance (2003), documented her search for sex at 67 years of age by putting a literary personal ad in the New York Review of Books.

== See also ==
- Child prodigy
- Developmental psychology
- Child development
- Psychosocial development
- Puer Aeternus
- Neurodevelopmental disorder
- Pygmalion effect
- Theory of cognitive development
- "The Ugly Duckling"
