= Anarch =

Anarch may refer to:

- Anarchist, a person who adheres to the ideology of anarchism
- Anarch (sovereign individual) in the 1977 novel Eumeswil
- A fictional sect of vampires in the tabletop game Vampire: The Masquerade
- The 16th novel in the Gaunt's Ghosts series of novels
- A main character in 1967 novel Counter-Clock World by Philip K. Dick. Anarch Thomas Peak

== See also ==
- Thy Hand, Great Anarch!, a book by Nirad C. Chaudhuri
