= Barry Driscoll =

British wildlife artist

Barrington Lionel "Barry" Driscoll (15 December 1926 – 30 April 2006) was a British painter, wildlife artist and sculptor. Starting as a book illustrator, he specialized in animal subjects and established an international reputation as a wildlife artist.

In 1960 Driscoll painted three large murals in the London Zoo. A year later he illustrated the inaugural brochure for the World Wildlife Fund. By the mid-1960s Barry's work was appearing regularly in the national press, and he had his own Sunday Express wildlife column. In 1970 Time-Life commissioned him to do a series of paintings of fauna in Arizona.

== Early years ==
Born in Camberwell, Driscoll was one of four sons of a printer on the Daily Express. During World War II his family moved to Shropshire, where, truant from school, the young Driscoll roamed the countryside and began making sketches from nature. He was a keen reader, and in particular cherished Gilbert White's Natural History of Selborne.

Driscoll was conscripted into the army, and was commissioned into the Royal Army Service Corps in 1947. He served as a subaltern in India, where he "lost" the convoy of which he was in charge, and was severely reprimanded. He later served in the Palestine Mandate, Egypt, and Northern Ireland. In 1948 he enrolled at St Martin's School of Art on the British equivalent of the GI Bill. After he graduated from St Martin's with a national diploma in design, he won a place at the Royal College of Art.

He married Kiffi Bowerley, a fellow St Martin's student, in 1951; they had three children (one of whom, Guy, died in 1996). They divorced in 1979.

He launched himself on a career as an illustrator, which stretched on into the 1970s and included many national press campaigns; authors he collaborated included the famous naturalist Gerald Durrell and the Hans Christian Andersen Awardee René Guillot. By 1982 he became a sculptor, enjoying the technique of working in a three-dimensional medium. He declared that sculpture was easy when compared with painting.

He made many trips to Italy to oversee his sculptures, forged by the Mariani foundry at Pietrasanta. His son, Falcon, married an Italian woman, Sabina Coppola, in 2001, further copper-fastening Barry Driscoll's love of Italy.

== Exhibitions ==
Driscoll was under less pressure to exhibit than many other artists. He did show with the Society of Wildlife Artists (SWLA), of which he was a member, and with the Phoenix Gallery in Lavenham, Suffolk, although he was not represented by any major commercial gallery. In 2002, he was the principal sculptor in a wildlife show of two- and three-dimensional works which originated at the Accademia Nazionale d'Arte Antica e Moderna in Turin, Italy. It travelled then to Barcelona, then back to the Society of Wildlife Artists (SWLA) in England.

== Death ==
He died of cancer, aged 79, and was survived by his former wife, Kiffi; his children, Pippa and Falcon, and by Leila Kooros, Driscoll's later partner in life.

== Bibliography ==
An incomplete list of his important illustrations include the books:

- Mokokambo: The Lost Land, Rene Guillot (1961)
- Very Fine Company: Birds about my Garden, Jo Heriot (1963)
- The Curious World of Snakes (Natural Science Picture Books) with Alfred Leutscher (31 December 1963)
- Tarka the Otter - North Devon, the country of Tarka's life and death (as Illustrator) by Henry Williamson (1964)
- Apes and Monkeys (Natural Science Picture Books) by Desmond Morris (31 December 1964)
- Two in the Bush, Gerald Durrell (1966)
- The King of Cats, René Guillot (1966)
