= William Papas =

American cartoonist

Santorini

William Papas (15 July 1927 – 19 June 2000) was a political cartoonist and caricaturist, book author and illustrator, and watercolourist. In the 1960s and 1970s he worked for The Guardian, The Sunday Times and Punch. His work has won international acclaim and is included in many private and corporate collections around the world.

== Biography ==
Papas was born in Ermelo, Union of South Africa, and was educated at Pretoria Boys High School. His father, Kostas Papas, was a Greek immigrant.

At the age of 15, he ran away from home to join the South African Air Force, and flew coastal missions as a tail gunner during the war. He later studied art at Johannesburg Art School, then at Beckenham School of Art in Kent, and at St Martin's in London.

His first published cartoon appeared in the Cape Times in 1951, and his first illustrated book, Under the Table Cloth, was published in 1952. He later freelanced in Johannesburg as artist-cum-reporter, notably covering Nelson Mandela's treason trial in 1958.

In 1959 he returned to Britain with his family, his wife Aroon McConnell and daughter Peta, their two sons Warren & Vollmer, settling in Kent and joining the staff of The Guardian. In 1963 he took over from David Low as political cartoonist. He also drew comic strips and produced pictorial reports, covering, for example, Cyprus in 1965 and the Six-Day War in 1967. Between 1964 and 1972 he also produced cartoons for the Sunday Times and Punch. In this period also began his association with Oxford University Press, writing and illustrating books for both children and adults. As an illustrator he worked mostly in pen and ink, and once said "I prefer writing and illustrating children's books, especially on social and political themes. It is a form of elongated cartooning."

He was divorced in 1969 and in 1970 married his second wife, Tessa Pares. He spent the next ten years in Greece, then moved to Geneva and in 1984 to Oregon, continuing to paint and illustrate. In Oregon he also ran his own art gallery and drew an evocative series of pen-and-ink and watercolour pictures of American cities, later published as Papas' America and Papas' Portland among others.

Papas died at Hotnarko Lake, British Columbia, on 19 June 2000, following a flying accident.

== Recognition ==
Papas was a commended runner up for the 1964, 1967, and 1968 Kate Greenaway Medals from the Library Association, recognising the year's best work of children's book illustration by a British subject. He garnered six commendations including one "for work in general" (unique to 1964) and five for particular 1967 and 1968 books published by Oxford University Press: The Church by Geoffrey Moorhouse; No Mules, A Letter from India, A Letter from Israel, and Taresh the Tea Planter, four that Papas both wrote and illustrated. (Note: Today there are usually eight books on the Greenaway shortlist. According to CCSU, some runners-up were Commended (from 1959) or Highly Commended (from 1974). There were 99 commendations of both kinds in 44 years including three for 1964, three 1967, five 1968. At the time (so near as Helen Oxenbury's 1969 Medal), the Greenaway was sometimes awarded for two books and it is not known whether any of the five works now listed in association with 1967–68 commendations of Papas were runners-up as single candidates for the medal.)

Some of his cartoons were chosen for the 1970 National Portrait Gallery exhibition "Drawn and Quartered: the world of the British newspaper cartoon 1720–1970", and examples of his work are held in the permanent collections of the Victoria and Albert Museum, the Centre for the Study of Cartoons and Caricature at the University of Kent, the Vorres Museum (Athens) and the Old City Museum (Jerusalem).

Alan Coren, former editor of Punch, described Papas as "a highly distinguished original artist, whose work, I firmly believe, is not only of significance of its time, but will make an important contribution to the journalistic history of that time".

== Selected works ==
=== Written and illustrated ===
- The Press (1964)
- The Law (1964)
- The Story of Mr. Nero (1965)
- Tasso (1966)
- No Mules (1967)
- Life Is One Big Bag of Nails (1968)
- A Letter from India (1968)
- A Letter from Israel (1968)
- Taresh the Tea Planter (1968)
- People of Old Jerusalem (1980)
- Papas' America (1987)
- Papas' The University Club of Portland (1993)
- Papas' Portland (1995)
- Papas' Greece (1997)
- Instant Greek (1999)

=== Illustrated ===
Papas illustrated books written by more than a dozen people.

- Aubrey Sussens: Under the Table Cloth (1952)
- Charles Downing: Tales of the Hodja (1964)
- René Guillot: The Children of the Wind (1964)
- Ruth Manning-Sanders: Damian and the Dragon: Modern Greek Folk-Tales (1965)
- Philip Turner: The Grange at High Force (1965)
- Andrew Salkey: Earthquake (1965)
- Hesba Fay Brinsmead: Season of the Briar (1965); Beat of the City (1966)
- Geoffrey Moorhouse, The Church (1967)
- H. M. Nahmad: The Peasant and the Donkey: Tales of the Near and Middle East (1968)
- Fynn (pseudonym of Sydney Hopkins): Mister God, This Is Anna (1974)
- Malcolm Muggeridge: In a Valley of This Restless Mind (1977)
- Pope John Paul I: Illustrissimi (1978)
- C. S. Lewis: The Screwtape Letters (1979, orig. 1942)
- Amos Oz: Soumchi (1980)
- Aurelia Smeltz: A Lone Red Apple (1998)
- Nikolay Gogol: Taras Bulba and Other Tales (1968)
