= Margaret Jowett =

British children's writer

Margaret Mary Jowett (18 April 1921 – 10 December 2014) was a British children's writer who wrote two historical novels about the English theatre. She wrote that her books were intended for those readers "who will one day take their theatrical scholarship neat, but are not yet of an age to do so".

Jowett was born in Ipswich, Suffolk on 18 April 1921. Her novel Candidate for Fame (1955), set in Richard Brinsley Sheridan's Drury Lane theatre, was commended for the Carnegie Medal in 1955. Its title is a reference to the actress Sarah Siddons, who described herself as "an ambitious candidate for fame". Jowett's story of Deborah Keate, the daughter of a travelling actor-manager in the reign of George III, provides a framework for a description of 18th-century society, politics, and theatre. The novel includes portrayals of the Season at Bath, the furore of a Westminster election, the rivalries of leading ladies and the political intrigues connected with the theatre.

A Cry of Players (1961) is set in the world of Elizabethan theatre. It tells the story of Harry Lulworth, who becomes a boy player in London acting in plays by a new dramatist, Will Shakespeare, while looking for his father, a player who has mysteriously disappeared.

Jowett was living in Clifton, York in 1978. She later moved to Hove, where she died from cancer and bronchopneumonia on 14 December 2014, at the age of 93.

== Works ==
- Candidate for Fame, Oxford University Press, 1955. With illustrations by Peggy Fortnum. Republished in the Oxford Children's Library.
- A Cry of Players, Oxford University Press, 1961. Illustrated by Asgeir Scott.
