= Nada Ćurčija Prodanović =

Serbian author

- Born: 1923
- Died: 1992 (aged 68–69)
- Occupations: Translator piano teacher
- Writing career
- Genre: Poetry

Nada Ćurčija Prodanović (1923–1992) was a Serbian translator, children's author and piano teacher.

== Life ==
Nada Ćurčija Prodanović was born in Banja Luka in 1923. After the Second World War she lived in Belgrade. She taught piano at the Belgrade Ballet School. She translated Serbian folk fales and ballads into English, and wrote a children's novel in English. She also translated in the other direction, translating writing by Carlos Castaneda, Sinclair Lewis, Lord Byron, and Joseph Conrad into Serbian. The main focus of her work was drama, and she translated plays by John Osborne, George Bernard Shaw, Oscar Wilde, Robert Bolt, Sean O'Casey, William Congreve and Harold Pinter.

== Works ==
- Serbian folk-tales. London: Oxford University Press, 1957. Oxford myths and legends. Illustrated by Joan Kiddell-Monroe.
- Ballerina. London: Oxford University Press, 1961. Illustrated by Dušan Ristić. Republished 1970, as part of the Oxford Children's Library.
- Heroes of Serbia: folk ballads retold. London: Oxford University Press, 1963. Illustrated by Dušan Ristić.
- Ballet on Tour. London: Oxford University Press, 1972. Illustrated by Dušan Ristić.
- Teuta, Queen of Illyria. London: Oxford University Press, 1973.
