= Kpo the Leopard =

First English-languade edition (publ. Oxford University Press, 1955)

Kpo the Leopard (original French title: Kpo la panthère) is an African wildlife story about a female leopard cub written by the French children's writer René Guillot (1900–1969), who lived, worked and travelled for much of his life in French Africa.

Set initially in the African jungle, the story moves, after Kpo and her mother escape from a forest fire, to new hunting-grounds in the African Plain, and tells the story of Kpo's adventures as she matures into a full-grown leopard.

Kpo the Leopard was published in 1955 and, twenty years later, was included in The Hamish Hamilton Book of Wise Animals, together with pieces featuring "fabulous animals" such as Edgar Allan Poe's The Raven, E. Nesbit's Psammead, T. S. Eliot's Mr. Mistoffelees, and Rollicum Bitem the Fox by John Masefield.
