= Hey, What's Wrong with This One? =

Book by Maia Wojciechowska

- Cover of the 1969 Harper & Row edition
- Author: Maia Wojciechowska
- Language: English
- Publication date: 1969

Hey, What's Wrong with This One? is a 1969 children's novel by Maia Wojciechowska. Written for older elementary school and middle school aged children, the work centers around three brothers and their father in the aftermath of the death of the children's mother.

== Plot summary ==
Set in Connecticut, Wojciechowska's novel covers the trials of young Mott as he tries to find a new mother for himself and his two brothers, Harley and Davidson. Mott sets his father up on dates with a string of women, but each one has at least one personality quirk his brothers just cannot stand.

== Awards ==
It won the Georgia Children's Book Award for 1972–3.
