= Doctor Wooreddy's Prescription for Enduring the Ending of the World =

1983 novel by Mudrooroo Nyoongah

- Author: Mudrooroo Nyoongah (Colin Johnson)
- Cover artist: Terry Yumbulul
- Language: English
- Genre: Historical novel
- Publisher: University of Queensland Press
- Publication date: 1983
- Publication place: Australia
- Media type: Paperback
- Pages: 207
- ISBN: 978-0-947062-02-6
- OCLC: 26559359
- Dewey Decimal: 823/.54 22
- LC Class: PR9619.3.N32 D63 1983

Doctor Wooreddy's Prescription for Enduring the Ending of the World is an historical novel by Mudrooroo Nyoongah, first published in 1983. A tragedy, the work explores the reaction of Aboriginal Tasmanians to European colonisation during the nineteenth century. It has several characters based on real-life historical figures, including Truganini, George Augustus Robinson, and Governor George Arthur.

The story is told almost exclusively from the perspective of its protagonist, Wooreddy (based on the real-life figure of Worraddy, a Nueonne man from North Bruny Island). A few moments are told from the point of view of 'Mr Robinson'. The novel focuses on the relationships between Wooreddy, his companions, and Robinson, a colonial official dispatched to Tasmania to act as a 'conciliator' between them and the European colonists. It also deals with Robinson's relationship with "Trugernanna" (based on the real-life Trugernanner, widely considered to be the last full-blooded Aboriginal Tasmanian). Justin MacGregor suggests that Robinson's presence "allows for a reversal of the colonial contact novel: ... here it is the Aboriginals who are depicted as human and spiritual, and the invaders, the white ghosts or num, who are treated as curiosities. ... there is little doubt that [the author] sees [Robinson] unsympathetically as a self-aggrandized co-conspirator in the colonial process who is more ridiculous than sympathetic".

Throughout the narrative the violence of colonisation is documented and explored: "a clear parallel is established between the rape of the Tasmanian Aboriginal women and the metaphorical rape of their land, sacred sites and heritage." David Kerr argues that the four characters – Wooreddy, Trugernanna, Ummarrah and Wayler – each represent a major stance taken by Aboriginal Tasmanians in reaction to colonisation. Despite their struggles, and the deaths of many key characters, some have seen the ending as hinting "at the possibility of successful cross-cultural communication".

== Characters ==
- Wooreddy (Woorrady) - The main character of the novel, who befriends Mr. Robinson. As a boy, he finds an omen from the sea that he believes is predicting the end of the world.
- Mr. Robinson (George Augustus Robinson) - Sent to Bruny Island to 'protect' the Aborigines, later sent on an expedition to contact the natives on Tasmania and colonise the island. Known by the natives as "Meeter Ro-bin-un," "Fader," and "Ballawine."
- Trugernanna (Trugernanner) - The second wife of Wooreddy who he knows from the start of puberty.
- Mangana - Trugernanna's father, who helps educate Wooreddy. The last surviving man on Bruny Island, he recognizes the coming doom of his people.
- Wayler - A female leader of a band of Aboriginal guerrillas.
- Ummarrah - An Aboriginal Tasmanian who accompanies part of Robinson's expedition through his homeland. A prideful warrior, he was previously captured by European colonists and sneaks off the journey to return to his homeland, where he joins Wayler's raiding party.
- Governor George Arthur - Governor of Van Diemen's Land (now Tasmania, Australia), a supporter of Robinson who aids his expedition.
