= Mary and Catherine Lee =

English writing duo

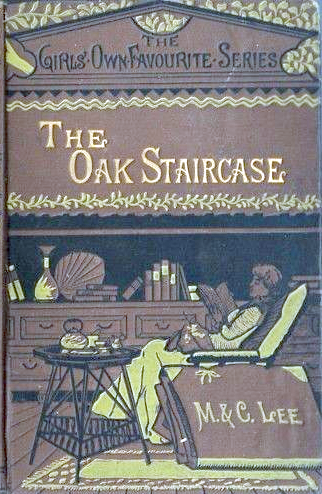
The Oak Staircase, 1870s

Mary Susanna Lee (1846–1908) and her sister Catherine Harriet Lee (1847–1914) were English writers of children's fiction. Several of their books had a historical setting; some were targeted at girls. They were usually co-authors and published as M. and C. Lee or Mary and Catherine Lee.

Born in London to Henry Boyle Lee MRCS and his wife Anne, they lived in the south of England, and spent their later years in Bishops Stortford with their younger sister Frances.

Their historical fiction includes Lucy's Campaign, about a girl caught up with Charles Edward Stuart's entourage in 1745. Rosamond Fane tells a story of James II as a boy, and The Oak Staircase uses the Duke of Monmouth's Rebellion as a starting point.

Mary Lee participated in a collaborative novel, The Miz Maze, or the Winkworth Puzzle, with Charlotte Mary Yonge and seven other writers. She and Catherine published a story called Hallowmas Eve at Horsemandown in Yonge's magazine, the Monthly Packet: .

When Mary Lee died the Athenaeum Magazine said her stories "gave pleasure to many young people and some older readers". The Lees' work received positive, if brief, reviews. For instance, "a capital story, which cannot fail to keep its young readers' attention and interest", was The Spectator's verdict on Goldhanger Woods. Several novels ran to more than one edition, like The Oak Staircase, which was published at least four times between 1872 and 1914. In 1963 Rosamond Fane was republished as part of the Oxford Children's Library.

One critic, however, complained that Lucy's Campaign, despite its subtitle "a story of adventure", was "merely a tale for girls" in which the political and military events of the era had been made "subservient to matters of social interest".

== Works by both authors together ==
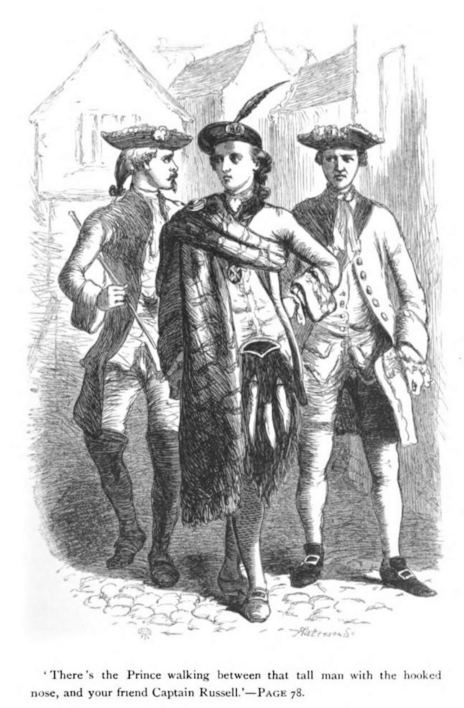
Picture from Lucy's Campaign

- Lucy's Campaign: a story of adventure (1867)
- Rosamond Fane; or, the Prisoners of St. James's (1870)
- The Oak Staircase; or the Stories of Lord and Lady Desmond. A narrative of the times of James II (1872)
- Hallowmas Eve at Horsemandown, in The Monthly Packet (1873)
- Joachim's Spectacles: a legend of Florenthal (1876)
- Goldhanger Woods: a child's romance (1887)
- Mrs. Dimsdale's Grandchildren (1888)
- The Family Coach (1890)
- St. Dunstan's Fair (1892)
- Told after Tea (1892)
- Miss Coventry's Maid: a story for girls (1895)
- Kitty's birthday (1897)
- Laurie's Motto (1897)
