= Shadow of a Bull =

1964 novel by Maia Wojciechowska

- Author: Maia Wojciechowska
- Original title: Shadow of a Bull
- Illustrator: Alvin Smith
- Language: English
- Genre: Children's novel
- Publisher: Atheneum Books
- Publication date: 1964
- Publication place: United States
- Media type: Print (Hardback & Paperback)
- Pages: 155
- ISBN: 0-689-30042-5
- OCLC: 14079307

Shadow of a Bull is a novel by Maia Wojciechowska that was awarded the Newbery Medal for excellence in American children's literature in 1965.

== Plot summary ==
Twelve-year-old Manolo Olivar is the son of Juan Olivar, a renowned bullfighter who was killed in the ring when Manolo was only three. The people in the town of Archangel, Spain, expect that Manolo will follow in his father's footsteps. His best friend, Jaime, has a brother, Juan, who yearns to fight bulls like his father before him, but Manolo has been trying to conquer his own fears. Many of the townspeople have paid much attention to Manolo, mainly by comparing him to his famous father or taking him to bullfights to see how to perform the sport. Through all this commotion, Manolo is trying to learn more about his father. Everyone in the town always speaks of how great Juan Olivar, Manolo's father, was, but Manolo wants to know the truth. Manolo has heard that his father first killed a bull when he was twelve years old. Manolo wants to know, did Juan Olivar have fear? After seeing the result of a bull goring, Manolo becomes more discouraged in becoming a bullfighter. He notices the old doctor cleaning the wound and, hearing that he was the only doctor who would touch a goring injury, decides that he could be the next doctor. Manolo still suffers from the problem that everyone wants him to be a bullfighter, not a doctor.

Realizing that he should follow in his father's footsteps, Manolo trains in secret as a matador with his friend's brother Juan. The more he practices, the sooner Manolo realizes how big a coward he is. The days left until the annual fiesta, his first bullfight, are decreasing. Manolo is close friends with Count De La Casa, a very famous count who also knew Manolo's father. Because of their friendship, Manolo is confident that the count would give him anything he asked for. Manolo goes and meets with Juan and promises him that he would ask the count if Juan could be invited to the party. Manolo does not tell Juan that he would like it if Juan fought Manolo's bull so he can have a chance for the count to see him fight. The day of his first contest arrives, and Manolo is successful in the corrida. He knows all the moves and has practiced daily, but when it is time for the killing, Manolo realizes that he simply does not have the spirit of a bullfighter, and he finally offers Juan a chance in the ring. The doctor who Manolo had met previously offers Manolo an apprenticeship, allowing Manolo to follow his own dream.

== Characters ==
- Manolo Olivar (Son of Juan Olivar)
- Juan Garcia (Manolo's Friend)
- Count De La Casa
- Old Doctor
- El Magnifico
- The Six Men (aficionados)

== Reception ==
Kirkus Reviews described the book as "appropriately elegiac in tone." In a retrospective essay about the Newbery Medal-winning books from 1956 to 1965, librarian Carolyn Horovitz wrote: "There are no tricks; the story simply accumulates power as it proceeds. Here is a book, 'distinguished' in its simplicity and dignity, a book concerned with beauty and terror, a book to make the reader wonder."

Awards
Preceded by It's Like This, Cat	Newbery Medal recipient 1965	Succeeded by I, Juan de Pareja
