= The Danedyke Mystery =

1979 British TV series

- Genre: Mystery
- Based on: Septimus and the Danedyke Mystery by Stephen Chance
- Written by: Willis Hall
- Directed by: Jonathan Wright-Miller
- Starring: Michael Craig; Kenneth Colley; Tessa Peake-Jones
- Composer: Alan Parker
- Country of origin: United Kingdom
- Original language: English
- No. of series: 1
- No. of episodes: 6

Production
- Producers: Pauline Shaw; Michael Cox
- Running time: 30 minutes
- Production company: Granada Television

Original release
- Network: ITV
- Release: 3 June – 15 July 1979

The Danedyke Mystery is a 1979 British mystery television series which originally aired on ITV in 1979. A former police detective turned Anglican priest investigates strange goings on in the fictional village of Danedyke St Mary.

== Cast ==
- Michael Craig as Rev. Septimus Treloar
- Kenneth Colley as The Major
- Tessa Peake-Jones as Angela Horton
- John Rhys-Davies as Armchair
- Derek Thompson as Tom Richards
- Adrian Delaney as Russell Skingle
- Preston Lockwood as Dr. Henry Simmonds
- Peter Vaughan as Det. Insp. Burroughs
- Jeremy Child as Sir James Carruthers
- Fanny Rowe as Mary Crowle
- Leon Eagles as Olov Hellerstadt
- Bernard Latham as PC Skingle
- Robert Longden as Lionel Empson
- Simon Molloy as Det. Sgt. Trasker
- Lee Atkins as Choir boy
- Candace Hartley as Jenny
- Valerie Shute as Policewoman
- William Tarmey as Workman
- Teddy Turner as Warner Baxendale
- David Sumner as Narrator

== Bibliography ==
- Mark J. Docherty & Alistair D. McGown. The Hill and Beyond: Children's Television Drama - An Encyclopedia. Bloomsbury Academic, 2003.
