= Stanley McNail =

American poet

- Born: 1918?
- Died: 1995
- Occupation: Poet
- Writing career
- Genre: poetry

Stanley McNail (1918? – 1995) was an American poet. Born in Southern Illinois, from 1950 he lived in San Francisco, where he edited and published Nightshade, an occasional broadside of fantasy and the macabre in poetry, and The Galley Sail Review, which the San Francisco Examiner described as "one of San Francisco's most respect poetry magazines." He also directed Galley Sail Publications and The Nine Hostages Press, and was poetry editor for Renaissance magazine. Collections of his poetry include Footsteps in the Attic (Galley Sail Publications, 1958) (1958)), The Black Hawk Country (Hickory Stick Press, 1960; reprinted Nine Hostages Press, 1967), Something Breathing (1965)) and At Tea in the Mortuary (1991)).
