= David Severn =

David Storr Unwin (3 December 1918 – 11 February 2010), known as David Severn, was a British writer. He was the son of publisher Sir Stanley Unwin, of whom Severn wrote a biography in 1982, Fifty Years with Father. He had Who's Who entries throughout his writing career.

Severn attended Abbotsholme School, Derbyshire, 1933–36, and worked for the League of Nations Secretariat, Geneva (1938), Unwin Brothers (printers), 1939, Blackwells (1940) and George Allen & Unwin (1941–43), having been declared medically unfit for the armed services.

His first series for children (1942–46) featured "Crusoe" Robinson, who was befriended by youngsters in holiday adventures, many featuring a Romany group. The Warner family series followed (1947–52), featuring pheasants, ponies and country life. The scraperboard illustrations of Joan Kiddell-Monroe greatly enhance these two series.

A number of books experimented with the paranormal and time-slip, and can be compared with many modern books revisiting supernatural themes. Drumbeats! has a musical youngster beating a native drum which transports children to a lost expedition to Africa twenty years earlier. Dream Gold shows the hypnotic power of one boy over another, with dreams reliving the conflicts of their ancestors. These are his most interesting books, and the ones he wished to be remembered by. The Future Took Us is a time-slip into 3,000 C.E. The Girl in the Grove, his longest book, is a psychological ghost story. He also produced illustrated books for younger children.

Only his last three books were published by Allen & Unwin.

== Books for children as David Severn ==
(Published in London by The Bodley Head unless indicated, selected titles in New York by Houghton Mifflin 1946–47 and thereafter Macmillan. Popular titles translated into various European languages.)

- Rick Afire (1942)
- A Cabin for Crusoe (1943)
- A Waggon for Five (1944)
- Hermit in the Hills (1945)
- Forest Holiday (1946)
- Ponies and Poachers (1947)
- Wily Fox and the Baby Show (1947)
- Bill Badger and the Pine Martens (1947)
- The Cruise of the Maiden Castle (1948)
- Treasure for Three (1949)
- Dream Gold (1949)
- Wily Fox and the Christmas Party (1949)
- Bill Badger and the Bathing Pool (1949)
- Wily Fox and the Missing Fireworks (1950)
- Bill Badger and the Buried Treasure (1950)
- Crazy Castle (1951)
- My Foreign Correspondent through Africa (1951, Meiklejohn & Sons)
- Burglars and Bandicoots (1952)
- Drumbeats! (1953)
- Walnut Tree Meadow (1956)
- Blaze of Broadfurrow Farm (1956)
- The Future Took Us (1957)
- The Green-Eyed Gryffon (1958, Hamish Hamilton)
- Foxy Boy (1959) (The Wild Valley) (New York: Dutton)
- Three at the Sea (1959)
- Jeff Dickson: Cowhand (1963, Jonathan Cape)
- Clouds over Alberhorn (1963, Hamish Hamilton)
- A Dog for a Day (1965, Hamish Hamilton)
- The Girl in the Grove (1974, Allen & Unwin)
- The Wishing Bone (1977, Allen & Unwin)

== Books for adults as David Unwin ==
- The Governor’s Wife (Michael Joseph, 1954)
- A View of the Heath (Michael Joseph, 1956)
- Fifty Years with Father (Allen & Unwin, 1982)

== Sources ==
- Who's Who
- Carpenter H. and Pritchard M., 1984, The Oxford Companion to Children’s Literature, Oxford: Oxford University Press
- Doyle, Brian 1978 in Kirkpatrick, D. L., Twentieth Century Children’s Writers, London: Macmillan; 4th edition text by Linda Yeatman
- "David Severn" in Cambridge Companion to Children's Literature
- Stephen Bigger, David Severn (David Storr Unwin), Children’s Writer
