= Space Opera (Vance novel) =

1965 novel by Jack Vance

- Author: Jack Vance
- Cover artist: John Schoenherr
- Language: English
- Genre: Science fiction
- Publisher: Pyramid Books
- Publication date: February 16, 1965
- Publication place: United States
- Media type: Print (Paperback)
- Pages: 143

Space Opera is a science fiction novel by American writer Jack Vance, first published in 1965 by Pyramid Books. It is a stand-alone work, not part of any of Vance's novel sequences. The term "space opera" is typically used in science fiction literature to connote interstellar adventures, clashes of spacefleets and galactic empires. The use here is literal, however, about an opera company touring in outer space.

== Reception ==
Tom Staicar of Amazing Stories praised Vance for his "vivid and believeable" characterisation and called the novel "fun to read and a rare example of humor in SF as it should be handled." Baird Searles of Asimov's Science Fiction called it a "one-joke book, which luckily doesn’t go on long enough to wear thin", although he opined that Vance "doesn’t take enough advantage of the intrinsic humor of opera itself, certainly one of the funniest of the fine arts." Judith Merrill of F&SF wrote: "Only Vance could have brought this off, and he didn't manage."

== Sources ==
- Underwood, Tim; Chuck Miller (1980). Jack Vance. New York: Taplinger Publishing Company. p. 229. ISBN 0-8008-4295-2.
