= Something Breathing =

- Jacket illustration by Frank Utpatel for Something Breathing
- Author: Stanley McNail
- Cover artist: Frank Utpatel
- Language: English
- Genre: poetry
- Publisher: Arkham House
- Publication date: 1965
- Publication place: United States
- Media type: Print (Hardback)
- Pages: 44 pp

Something Breathing is a collection of poems by Stanley McNail. It was released in 1965 by Arkham House in an edition of 500 copies. It was the author's only book to be published by Arkham House. The book was printed in England by Villiers for Arkham House and is bound in green cloth rather than the distinctive gold printing on black binding of most Arkham House publications.

== Contents ==
Something Breathing contains the following poems:

1. "What the Voice Said"
2. "Metamorphoses"
3. "Lines to an Unbeliever"
4. "Dark Counsel"
5. "The Sounds She Knew"
6. "The Feast"
7. "Night Things"
8. "Who Goes There?"
9. "After the Rites"
10. "Three Sisters"
11. "Lights Along the Road"
12. "The Broken Wall"
13. "Merlin's Robe"
14. "Lottie Mae"
15. "The Gray People"
16. "The Covered Bridge"
17. "Miss Pinnie's Clothes"
18. "The Tall, Spare Summer"
19. "Nobody Knows Where Mary Went"
20. "The Red Beard of Fascinus"
21. "Dialogue"
22. "Elsie's House"
23. "The Witch-Mark"
24. "Follow the Wind"
25. "The Secrets of Cisterns"
26. "These Antlers"
27. "Old Black Billygoat"
28. "The Witch"
29. "Watson's Landing"
30. "A Note from Mother"
31. "The House on Maple Hill"
32. "Uncle Charlie"

== Reviews ==
A retrospective review of the volume was provided by poet and author Richard L. Tierney, in Studies in Weird Fiction 3 (Spring 1988).

== Reprints ==
Berkeley: Embassy Hall Editions, 1987 (with added poems). In July 1986, artist C.M. Chavez (1959- ) wrote to Arkham House Publishers, Inc. to inquire about the one-time reprint rights to a poem titled "Follow The Wind", published in the original 1965 Arkham House edition of SOMETHING BREATHING. Arkham House replied that the rights to Something Breathing were retained by the author, Stanley McNail, and supplied the artist with Mr. McNail's mailing address.

Mr. McNail cordially replied to the query, giving the requested permission, which allowed the artist to create a four-panel graphic sequence - accompanied by the full text of the poem - which debuted at the 1986 World Fantasy Convention in Providence, Rhode Island.

In 1987, Mr. McNail decided to expand and revise Something Breathing. the revised edition was published by Embassy Hall Editions of Berkeley, California, with the "Follow The Wind" sequence, plus one new drawing by the artist. The new edition debuted in October 1987, in time for The World Fantasy Convention in Nashville, Tennessee, and was debuted at a memorable Saturday night signing party hosted by the artist in the bar of the Hyatt Regency, attended by fantasy great William F. Nolan, noted editor/writer Stanley Wiater, 1984 World Fantasy Artist of the Year Stephen Gervais and many others.

There was a final collaboration between author and artist in 1991, At Tea in the Mortuary, also published by Embassy Hall Editions, with four new illustrations.
