= Thy Hand, Great Anarch! =

1987 non-fiction book by Nirad C. Chaudhuri

- Author: Nirad C. Chaudhuri
- Language: English
- Subject: comparative - historical, cultural and sociological analysis of India and Britain
- Genre: autobiographical, non fiction
- Publication date: 1987
- Publication place: England, India
- English publication date: 1987
- Media type: book
- Preceded by: Hinduism: A Religion to Live by (1979)
- Followed by: Three Horsemen of the New Apocalypse (1997)

Thy Hand, Great Anarch! is a 1987 autobiographical sequel to Indian essayist Nirad C. Chaudhuri's The Autobiography of an Unknown Indian. Its title was inspired from the concluding couplet of Alexander Pope's The Dunciad which runs thus:

Thy hand, great Anarch! lets the curtain fall;
And universal Darkness buries All.

Written when Chaudhuri was in his 80s, this book provides a perspective to the Indian political scene from the 1920s to India's independence. The book covers the writer's working life in India, first as a clerk in the Military Accounts Department, then as an editor, writer and publicist. While as a clerk, he came across Arnold's Scholar Gypsy which inspired him to leave his secure government job and become a writer, which he thought was his calling. Although always a severe critic of Mahatma Gandhi, Chaudhuri shows a remarkable respect for the Mahatma when the latter led the masses in the Civil Disobedience Movement.
