= Rinkin of Dragon's Wood =

1965 children's book by Thora Colson

- First edition (UK)
- Author: Thora Colson
- Illustrator: Pat Marriott
- Language: English
- Genre: Children's novel
- Publisher: Jonathan Cape (UK); E. P. Dutton (US)
- Publication date: 1965
- Publication place: United Kingdom
- Media type: Print (Hardback & Paperback)
- Pages: 88 pp
- ISBN: 0-224-60819-3

Rinkin of Dragon's Wood is a children's book by Thora Colson published in Britain in 1965. It was Colson's first novel and was illustrated by Pat Marriott. It was also published in the United States by Dutton, and the German translation was published in Austria by Ueberreuter.

== Plot summary ==
The story follows the life of a young fox in the English countryside. He learns to fight and hunt, survives a drought and an encounter with a train, and takes a mate.
