= Jesús Torbado =

Spanish writer, journalist, and traveler (1943–2018)

Jesús Torbado (4 January 1943 – 22 August 2018) was a Spanish writer, journalist and traveler. He was born in León and studied journalism in Madrid. He won the 1965 Premio Alfaguara for his novel Las corrupciones. In 1976, he won the Premio Planeta for En el día de hoy, an alternate history about the Spanish Civil War. In 1993, he won the Premio Ateneo de Sevilla for El peregrino.

== Works ==
- 1965: Las corrupciones
- 1968: Historias de amor
- 1969: Tierra mal bautizada
- 1969: Un viaje por Tierra de Campos
- 1973: Moira estuvo aquí
- 1976: En el día de hoy
- 1977: Los topos, (co-written with Manu Leguineche)
- 1988: El camino de la Plata
- 1990: Yo, Pablo de Tarso
- 1991: El inspector de vírgenes
- 1993: Héroes apócrifos
- 1993: El peregrino
- 1998: El imperio de arena
- 1998: Viajeros intrépidos
- 1999: La ballena
