= Morning and Noon =

1965 book by Dean Acheson

Morning and Noon: A Memoir
- First edition
- Author: Dean Acheson
- Language: English
- Genre: Memoir
- Publisher: Houghton Mifflin Company
- Publication date: November 1965
- Publication place: United States
- Media type: Hardcover
- Pages: 288

Morning and Noon: A Memoir is an autobiographical book written by former United States Secretary of State Dean Acheson in 1965. In it Acheson describes the meaningful times and events of his early life—from his birth in 1893 up to the time of his swearing in as the U.S. Assistant Secretary of State for Economic Affairs on February 1, 1941.

In his "Introduction", the author explains that this book is about the significant moments of his early life and career, but that there are gaps in the history, which he explains as being from the parts of his life that were either uninteresting, too painful to recall, or too personal to share. As to where he ended the narrative in this book, he referred to that time as the middle of his middle age when a "sea change" was occurring between him and the events around him. As the title implied, he intended to continue his story in subsequent works.

== Contents ==
=== Chapter 1: The Radiant Morn ===
Referring to it as his "golden age of childhood", Acheson describes his experiences while growing up in the Connecticut Valley town of Middletown, Connecticut. He provides light-hearted descriptions of childhood perceptions and memorable characters, including his Canadian-American parents.

This chapter was previously published in part by the Saturday Evening Post on December 15, 1962.

=== Chapter 2: "I've Been Workin' on the Railroad" ===
The author recounts his summer of 1911, while working at a railroad camp near Cochrane, Ontario, on the construction of the Canada's transcontinental railroad, the Grand Trunk Pacific (later called the Canadian National). He describes the hardships of working as the low man on the totem pole, while also recollecting the enjoyable interactions with his co-workers.

=== Chapter 3: The Old Order Changeth ===
Begins with Acheson's arrive in Washington, D.C., in September 1919 to serve as the clerk for U.S. Supreme Court Justice Louis Brandeis. He arrived at a time of major change—President Woodrow Wilson had suffered a stroke and had disappeared from public life, the Republicans had taken control of congress in 1918, and the hopes of U.S. ratification of the Treaty of Versailles and U.S. membership in the League of Nations had dwindled. During his time with Brandeis, Republican Warren G. Harding was elected president, and in 1921 former Republican President William H. Taft became Chief Justice of the Supreme Court.

Much of this chapter describes Acheson's respect for, and daily interactions with Justice Brandeis. He also expresses his appreciation for Brandeis's mentorship and the wide spectrum of Washington society he met through this association.

=== Chapter 4: "Our Court" ===
The title of this chapter is borrowed from Justice Brandeis's use of the phrase in reference to the U.S. Supreme Court of the early 1920s. Acheson describes the members of the court, comparing their philosophies and their approaches to deciding the cases that came before them. He includes later hindsight in his evaluation of the justices and their decisions from that time.

=== Chapter 5: Working with Brandeis ===
In this chapter Acheson provides a detailed analysis of Justice Brandeis's approach to his role on the Supreme Court, and how that translated into the expectations he had of Acheson as his clerk. The topics in this chapter range from the justice's judicial philosophy and work ethic, to Acheson's daily routine. Acheson ends the chapter with an assessment of the Justice's influence on him, concluding with an excerpt from the tribute he gave at Brandeis's funeral in 1941.

=== Chapter 6: Litmus for Liberals in the Twenties ===
Acheson looks back at the history of liberalism in the United States. He begins by defining the litmus test issues of the day, during the last years of the Wilson administration and during the Harding years. He summarizes the successes and failures of the liberal movement since the 1920s, speculates about the strategic or political weaknesses of the movement, and closes by musing that if he had written this chapter 25 years earlier, it would have disqualified him as a liberal.

=== Chapter 7: Starting at the Top ===
By "top", Acheson refers to his first legal work as helping to represent a national government in an international case before the Permanent Court of Arbitration at The Hague. Employed by the law firm Covington & Burling for the case, he assisted co-founder Edward B. Burling in representing the Government of Norway, which sought payment from the United States government for the taking of Norwegian-owned property during World War I.

After providing background information on the principals of Covington & Burling, Acheson recounts his experience abroad, his participation in the case and its outcome, and the acquaintances he made in the process.

=== Chapter 8: And Working Down ===
Acheson returns to Washington and continues to work for Covington & Burling as their caseload rapidly expands. He describes some of the cases on which he assisted. His growing exposure to Washington insiders leads him to ponder about the sources of "practical" and "judicial statesmanship." After the nation went through economic frenzy and then faced economic disaster, a friend invites him to the Democratic National Convention in 1932, after which he worked energetically to help Franklin D. Roosevelt get elected president. Acheson volunteered to help the new administration draft legislation to reduce government expenditures and was invited to White House meetings. He concludes this chapter with the observation: "Thus does one get drawn closer and closer to the flypaper of taking part in government."

=== Chapter 9. Brief Encounter—with FDR ===
In this chapter Acheson recounts his experience as the U.S. Undersecretary of the Treasury in the Roosevelt administration. He was recruited in May 1933 to serve under Treasury Secretary William H. Woodin, accepted, and was confirmed to the post. Soon after, however, Woodin was incapacitated by illness and Acheson served as acting Secretary. The author explains his open opposition to the President's plan to fight crippling deflation by taking the U.S. dollar off the gold standard and thereby reducing its value. FDR eventually tired of his opposition and forced his resignation in November. The author provides newspaper quotes covering his appointment, tenure, and resignation.

=== Chapter 10. The Road Back ===
In this chapter Acheson describes his return to private law practice with Covington & Burling and summarizes some of the case on which he worked. For him a highlight of this period was when he served as the representative of his friend and former law professor, Felix Frankfurter, in January 1939 during Senate confirmation hearings after FDR's appointment of Frankfurter to the U.S. Supreme Court. As war seemed imminent in Europe, Acheson became increasingly vocal supporting the need for America to ready for war and to stop the Axis power of World War II. The chapter ends with his swearing in as the Assistant Secretary of State for Economic Affairs on February 1, 1941.

=== Notes section ===
In this section Acheson includes the full text of documents and speeches to which he makes reference in the body of the book. There is a wealth of information regarding the gold-standard debate during his service as Undersecretary of the Treasury. He also includes the full text of a speech he gave at Yale in November 1939, and a memo to Harry Hopkins urging American preparation for war in 1940.

== Critical reaction ==
Charles Poore, book reviewer for The New York Times, summed up his response in his review title—"The Glow Is Mellow, the Substance Diamond-Hard". As to the book's overall content, he wrote, "Since Mr. Acheson disavows formal autobiography at the outset, we are spared the obscure bayous with which zealous hoarders of their own accomplishments fill out their landscapes." In describing Acheson's style, he wrote: "Like a good letter writer, Mr. Acheson talks less about himself than about others. He unfailingly catches traits that make people live before your eyes."

The New York Times also published a review of this book by Stephen K. Bailey, the dean of the Maxwell Graduate School of Citizenship and Public Affairs at Syracuse University, and a former mayor of Acheson's home town of Middletown, Connecticut. Bailey commented on what Middletown had meant to Acheson, and Acheson to Middletown, and speculated that the author's experiences growing up there had prepared him for his later remarkable performance in public service. Bailey summarized his impression of the book with: "What comes through is a man disciplined in work and style who has never lost his zest for life; who loves freedom and appreciates its cost; who delights in the tricks of reason and the safety valves of ribaldry; who understands but is not cowed by the perversities and narrow tolerances which mark and limit every civilized advance."
