= Maia Wojciechowska =

Polish-American children's writer

- Born: August 7, 1927; Warsaw, Poland
- Died: June 13, 2002 (aged 74); Long Branch, New Jersey
- Spouses: Selden Rodman (m. 1950; div. 1957) Richard Larkin (m. 1970; div. 1981)

Maia Teresa Wojciechowska (August 7, 1927 – June 13, 2002) was a Polish-American writer best known for children's and young adult fiction. Her first book and two books for adults were published under her married name Maia Rodman.

== Life ==
Wojciechowska was born in Warsaw, Poland, and was schooled in Poland, France, and England. After the 1939 invasion of Poland, the family fled to France, where she attended dozens of schools. They moved to California, USA, in 1942.

Wojciechowska married Selden Rodman in 1950 and they had one daughter, Oriana. They divorced in 1957, as did she and her second husband Richard Larkin, who were married between 1970 and 1981. For some time in the 1980s–90s she lived in New Jersey with her adopted daughter Leonara.

A resident of Mahwah, New Jersey, Wojciechowska died of a stroke at age 74 in Long Branch, New Jersey.

== Awards ==
In 1965, her book Shadow of a Bull (1964), features a Spanish boy destined to be a bullfighter. It won the 1965 Newbery Medal recognizing the year's best contribution to American children's literature. Its German-language edition won the Deutscher Jugendbuchpreis for youth books in 1968.

== Selected works ==
- Market Day for Ti Andre (1952), as Maia Rodman
- ”Shadow of a Bull” (1964)
- Odyssey of Courage: The Story of Alvar Núñez Cabeza de Vaca (New York: Atheneum Books, 1965)
- A Kingdom in a Horse (New York: Harper & Row, 1965)
- The Hollywood Kid (Harper & Row, 1966)
- A Single Light (Harper & Row, 1968)
- Tuned Out (Harper & Row, 1968); Laurel-Leaf edition, ISBN 0-440-99139-0
- Hey, What's Wrong with This One? (Harper & Row, 1969)
- Don't Play Dead Before You Have To: A Novel (Harper & Row, 1970)
- The Rotten Years (New York: Doubleday & Company), 1971
- The Life and Death of a Brave Bull (New York: Harcourt, Brace, Jovanovich [HBJ], 1972), ISBN 0-15-245200-1
- Till the Break of Day: Memories: 1939-1942 (HBJ, 1972)
- Through the Broken Mirror with Alice: Including parts of Through the Looking-Glass (HBJ, 1972), ISBN 0-15-286950-6
- Winter Tales from Poland (Doubleday, 1973), ISBN 0-385-02839-3
- The People in His Life: A Novel (New York: Stein and Day, 1980), ISBN 0-8128-2717-1
- How God Got Christian into Trouble, (Philadelphia: Westminster Press), 1984, ISBN 0-664-32717-6
- Dreams of Golf (Pebble Beach, CA: Pebble Beach Press, 1993), ISBN 1-883740-01-0
- Dreams of Soccer (Pebble Beach, 1993)
- Dreams of the Super Bowl (Pebble Beach, 1993)
