= The Continent of Circe =

1965 book of essays by Nirad C. Chaudhuri

- Author: Nirad C. Chaudhuri
- Language: English
- Subject: Analysis of Indian society in the early 20th century from historical, sociological and cultural perspective
- Genre: autobiographical, non fiction
- Publisher: Jaico Books
- Publication date: 1965
- Publication place: India
- English publication date: 1965
- Media type: book
- Awards: Duff Cooper Memorial Prize (1966)
- Preceded by: A Passage to England (1959)
- Followed by: The Intellectual in India (1967)

The Continent of Circe is a 1965 book of essays written by Indian author Nirad C. Chaudhuri that was winner of the Duff Cooper Prize for 1966. In this book, Chaudhuri discusses Indian society from a socio-psychological perspective, commenting on Hindu society from Prehistory to modern times. The author's thesis is that militarism has been a way of life there from time immemorial.

Chaudhuri gives an account of various anthropological subgroups dominating the Indian subcontinent and the struggles between classes from the arrival of Aryans to later settlements of Huns in western India.

The book argues against the "pacifist" theory of India as being a peace-loving nation further cemented by the principles of nonviolence preached by Gandhi. The author holds a different view and points to what he sees as an inherent love for violence in Hindus stretching from Emperor Ashoka (exemplified with the battle of Kalinga), through the Imperial Guptas until the time India was invaded by Mughals in the early 15th century.

The focal point of the book is that every major Hindu dynasty has followed the path of war to secure and capture new domains and that violence is very much a part of life in Indian society. This is further corroborated by literary evidence, as can be seen in epics like the Mahabharata, Ramayana, the poems of Samudragupta etc., which give graphic descriptions of wars fought on a colossal scale.
