= Mudrooroo =

Australian author and poet (1938–2019)

- Born: Colin Thomas Johnson; 21 August 1938; Narrogin, Western Australia
- Died: 2019 (aged 80–81); Brisbane, Queensland
- Occupations: Author, poet, essayist, playwright
- Writing career
- Pen name: Mudrooroo

Colin Thomas Johnson (21 August 1938 – 2019), better known by his nom de plume Mudrooroo, and also published under the names Mudrooroo Narogin and Mudrooroo Nyoongah, was an Australian novelist, poet, essayist and playwright. He is best known for his first novel, Wild Cat Falling, which became a best-seller after its publication in 1965. His many works are centred on Aboriginal Australian characters and topics; however, there was doubt cast upon his claims to have Aboriginal ancestry.

== Early life ==
Colin Thomas Johnson was born on 21 August 1938 on a farm near Narrogin, Western Australia. He was the fifth child of Elizabeth (née Barron) – "the daughter of a well-to-do pioneer pastoral family" – and Thomas Creighton Johnson; his parents both had other children from earlier relationships. According to genealogical research compiled by Cassandra Pybus, his paternal grandfather Thomas Johnson was an African-American from North Carolina – possibly a free person of colour – who came to Australia in the 1850s or 1860s and married Mary Gallagher, an immigrant from County Clare, Ireland.

Mudroorooo's father died before he was born, leaving his mother "totally destitute"; his older siblings were placed in an orphanage but he remained in his mother's care until the age of nine. After spending seven years at Clontarf Boys' Town, he was turned out of the institution at the age of 16. He turned to burglary and served two stints in Fremantle Prison, where he began writing literature. After leaving prison, he travelled to India and London, before settling in Melbourne.

== Writing career ==
Johnson's first novel, Wild Cat Falling was a coming-of-age story set in Western Australia, and became a bestseller when it was published in 1965.

He then spent periods living in India and the United States, where he finished his novel Long Live Sandawara (published 1979) about the Bunuba resistance hero Jandamarra.

His works were published under the names Mudrooroo Narogin, Mudrooroo Nyoongah, and simply Mudrooroo.

== Other activities ==
In 1983 Thomas co-founded, with Jack Davis, the National Aboriginal and Islander Writers, Oral Literature, and Dramatists Association (NAIWOLDA). One of the organisation's priorities was to establish an independent national Black Australian publishing house.

== Recognition and awards ==
Mudrooroo won the FAW Patricia Weickhardt Award to an Aboriginal Writer in 1979.

He was appointed writer-in-residence at Murdoch University in Perth in 1982.

== Controversy over Aboriginality ==
Johnson changed his name to Mudrooroo around the time of the Australian Bicentenary (1988). He was also known as Mudrooroo Narogin and Mudrooroo Nyoongah, as well as Narogin, after the Indigenous spelling for his place of birth, and Nyoongah, after the name of the people from whom he claimed descent. Mudrooroo means paperbark in the Bibbulmun language group spoken by the Noongar.

In early 1996, a member of the Nyoongah community questioning Mudrooroo's Aboriginality approached journalist Victoria Laurie. Informed that Mudrooroo's oldest sister, Betty Polglaze, had conducted genealogical research in 1992 that traced some (although not all) of her family back five generations, Laurie contacted Polglaze. Polglaze, who identified as a white person, told Laurie that she could find no trace of Aboriginal ancestry in the family. Laurie subsequently wrote an article for her newspaper, The Australian, titled Identity Crisis sparking a scandal that received nationwide media coverage in 1996/97.

A request by the Nyoongah community to substantiate his claimed kinship to the Kickett family was not acknowledged because he was overseas and then in the process of relocating interstate. On 27 July 1996 the Nyoongah elders released a public statement: "The Kickett family rejects Colin Johnson's claim to his Aboriginality and any kinship ties to the family".

Mudrooroo's prior statements about Indigenous writers such as Sally Morgan, whom he excluded from his definition of Aboriginality, did not assist his cause. He had said of Morgan's book My Place that it made Aboriginality acceptable so long as you were "young, gifted and not very black". In addition, Mudrooroo's writings had placed emphasis on kinship and family links as key features of Aboriginal identity, and his rejection of his biological family deeply offended some in the Aboriginal community.

The resulting scandal and public debate over issues of authenticity and what constitutes Aboriginal identity led to some subject coordinators removing Mudrooroo's books from academic courses and he later said he was unable to find a publisher for a sequel to his previous novel. Initially, many people came to Mudrooroo's defence, some claiming it was a "white conspiracy" or a racist attack on Aboriginality, with some claiming Polglaze's "amateur sleuthing" was being exploited. Award-winning Indigenous author Graeme Dixon called on Mudrooroo to come forward and tell the truth, stressing that it was important to "out" pretenders and reclaim Aboriginal culture. Several authors see evidence in his writings that Mudrooroo deliberately assumed an Aboriginal identity to legitimise his work when in his early 20s, although it remains possible he was unaware. Editor Gerhard Fischer believes that it was Dame Mary Durack, though not Aboriginal herself, who "defined and determined" his Aboriginal identity. In an article published in 1997, Mudrooroo described Durack's foreword to his first novel as the origin of the "re-writing of his body" as Aboriginal. Mudrooroo later replied to his critics, stating that his dark skin meant he was always treated as Aboriginal by society, therefore his life experience was that of an Aboriginal man.

== Later life and death ==
After the 1996 controversy surrounding his Aboriginal identity, Mudrooroo spent 15 years living in India and Nepal, where he married (possibly for the third time) and had a son. In 2011 he and his family returned to Australia, where he published Balga Boy Jackson (2017) and began work on an (unfinished) autobiography.

He died in Brisbane in early 2019, at the age of 80.

== Bibliography ==
- Wild Cat Falling (as Colin Johnson; 1965)
- Long Live Sandawara (1979)
- Before the Invasion: Aboriginal Life to 1788, by Mudrooroo, Colin Bourke, and Isobel White (Melbourne &London: Oxford University Press, 1980; Melbourne & New York: Oxford University Press, 1980);
- Doctor Wooreddy's Prescription for Enduring the Ending of the World (Melbourne: Hyland House, 1983 and New York: Ballantine, 1983)
- The Song Circle of Jacky: And Selected Poems (Melbourne: Hyland House, 1986)
- Dalwurra: The Black Bittern, A Poem Cycle, edited by Veronica Brady and Susan Miller (Nedlands: Centre for Studies in Australian Literature, University of Western Australia, 1988)
- Doin Wildcat: A Novel Koori Script As Constructed by Mudrooroo (Melbourne: Hyland House, 1988)
- Writing from the Fringe: A Study of Modern Aboriginal Literature in Australia (South Yarra, Vic.: Hyland House, 1990)
- Master of the Ghost Dreaming: A Novel (Sydney: Angus & Robertson, 1991)
- The Garden of Gethsemane: Poems from the Lost Decade (South Yarra, Vic.: Hyland House, 1991)
- Wildcat Screaming: A Novel (Pymble, N.S.W.: Angus & Robertson, 1992)
- The Kwinkan (Pymble, N.S.W.: Angus & Robertson 1993)
- Aboriginal Mythology: An A-Z Spanning the History of the Australian Aboriginal Peoples from the Earliest Legends to the Present Day (London: Aquarian, 1994)
- Us Mob: History, Culture, Struggle: An Introduction to Indigenous Australia. (Sydney & London: Angus & Robertson, 1995)
- Pacific Highway Boo-Blooz: Country Poems (St. Lucia: University of Queensland Press, 1996)
- The Indigenous Literature of Australia: Milli Milli Wangka (South Melbourne, Vic.: Hyland House, 1997)
- The Undying (Pymble, N.S.W.: Angus & Robertson, 1998)
- Underground (Pymble, N.S.W.: Angus & Robertson, 1999)
- The Promised Land (Pymble, N.S.W.. Angus & Robertson, 2000)
- Edition: Wild Cat Falling, Imprint Classics edition, introduction by Stephen Muecke (Pymble, N.S.W.: Angus & Robertson, 1992)

=== Editorials and essays ===
- Struggling, a novella, in Paperbark: A Collection of Black Australian Writings, edited by J. Davis, S. Muecke, Mudrooroo, and A. Shoemaker (University of Queensland Press, 1990), pp. 199–290
- The Mudrooroo/Müller Project: A Theatrical Casebook, edited by Gerhard Fischer, Paul Behrendt, and Brian Syron—comprises The Aboriginal Protestors Confront
- The Declaration of the Australian Republic on 26 January 2001 with the Production of The Commission by Heiner Müller (Sydney: New South Wales University Press, 1993)
- Tell Them You're Indian, An Afterword, in Race Matters: Indigenous Australians and "Our" Society, ed. By Gillian Cowlishaw & Barry Morris (Canberra: Aboriginal Studies P, 1997)
