= The Grange at High Force =

1965 children's novel by Philip Turner

- First edition cover
- Author: Philip Turner
- Illustrator: William Papas
- Language: English
- Series: Darnley Mills
- Genre: Children's adventure novel
- Publisher: Oxford University Press
- Publication date: 1965
- Publication place: United Kingdom
- Media type: Print (hardback and paperback)
- Pages: 220 pp (first edition)
- OCLC: 214583
- LC Class: PZ7.T857 Gr
- Preceded by: Colonel Sheperton's Clock
- Followed by: Sea Peril

The Grange at High Force is a children's novel by Philip Turner, published by Oxford in 1965 with illustrations by William Papas. It was the second book published in the author's Darnley Mills series. Turner won the annual Carnegie Medal, recognising the year's best children's book by a British subject.

The Grange is a former farming estate above Darnley Mills, a fictional mill town in North East England or North Yorkshire, between the moors and the North Sea. It features both comic and dramatic episodes in a contemporary setting with strong links to the past.

In the US it was published by World Publishing Company (Cleveland, Ohio) in 1967 with illustrations by W. T. Mars.

== Plot introduction ==
The story begins about a year after the end of Colonel Sheperton's Clock, the first in the series. The three boys who are the main characters are firm friends, despite their different characters and interests. David, the former lame dreamer, is now entirely recovered from the operation on his leg, and participates fully in the physically active pursuits of his friends. They all attend King Charles II Grammar School. David and Peter are choirboys, but Arthur is temporarily out of the choir as his voice has broken. Much of the story takes place on the moors above the fictional town of Darnley Mills, over the course of a year, from one spring to the next, covering the period of the Admiral's tenancy at Folly Grange. The focus is particularly on the joint activities of the three boys and the men at the Grange. As in the first book, there is also an historically-based mystery to be solved.

== Plot summary ==
The novel opens in All Saints' church in Darnley Mills. Some time ago, Peter constructed a Roman ballista and accidentally broke a window in the church while testing it. Two pigeons, taking advantage of the broken window, built a nest in the nave. "Operation Bird's Nest" is now underway, with Arthur climbing up to remove the nest. The gathered crowd below are (quite unnecessarily) concerned for his safety, except for Miss Cadell-Twitten, who is still seething about the ejection of the birds from the church. Arthur poses in an empty niche, which Mr Pritchard explains once held a statue of the Virgin Mary.

The same day, the three friends set off to explore High Force on the moors, to see the waterfall and the tiny abandoned church of Little St. Mary's. Peter has an accident with his bicycle, aptly named the Yellow Peril. Seeking help at the Grange, they meet the Admiral and Guns, and are fascinated by the ancient ship's cannon on the Grange terrace and the workshop in the cellar where a mill wheel is being constructed to provide reliable electricity. The Admiral is in turn interested to hear about the ballista, and proposes that both weapons should be fired at targets to test their accuracy.

They all go together to look at the church, and find it has been invaded by dozens of birds. It needs re-roofing, and thorough cleaning. They set about the various tasks with energy and enthusiasm, also stumbling on a mystery concerning the statue. Miss Cadell-Twitten hints that she knows the answer, but refuses to tell them because they accidentally frightened her bird Augustus.

Plans to fire the cannon are scotched by the police sergeant, until an opportunity arrives just before Christmas, when they succeed in sinking a makeshift raft. Immediately afterwards, a blizzard starts and they help Mr Ramsgill gather in his scattered flock. An exceptionally heavy snowfall cuts off the moor, and even with a snow plough it is a struggle to return to the Grange through the deep drifts. David, the only one who can manage the snowshoes, checks on Bird Cottage and finds Miss Cadell-Twitten suffering from exposure. Grateful for her rescue, she tells them where to find the statue, which is recovered and returned to All Saints.

The novel ends with a two-gun salute, as the Admiral and Guns set off in the spring in their new boat to explore the coastline of the British Isles.

== Characters ==
Boys

- Peter Beckford, the mechanically-minded schoolboy son of the Rector, always inventing things
- Arthur Ramsgill of Blackrock Farm on the edge of the moor, an expert climber and sheep-handler
- David Hughes, son of a craftsman carpenter, imaginative and attracted to a life at sea

Adults

- The Rector of All Saints church, Peter's father
- Charlie Bastable, "Old Charlie", the verger
- Mr Pritchard, the organist and choirmaster, town chemist and local historian
- Father Ronald, a visiting Franciscan friar
- Sergeant Macintosh, "Rainproof", a stern but amiable policeman
- Miss Cadell-Twitten, "The Twitter", elderly bird-lover who lives in Bird Cottage on the moors, the eccentric owner of neighbouring Folly Grange
- Admiral Sir John Beauchamp-Troubridge, V.C., D.S.O and bar, RN, retired, the temporary tenant of Folly Grange
- "Guns" Kelly, the admiral's man, a former gunner
- Bos'n Jake, a Swedish ex-whaler who runs a ship chandler's-cum-junk shop in Darnley Mills near the river
- Mr Ramsgill, Arthur's father, a moorland sheep farmer
- Mrs Ramsgill, Arthur's mother
- Annie Ramsgill, Arthur's sister

Animals

- Fo'c'sle, the admiral's dog, an Alsatian
- Captain, Mr Ramsgill's hunter, ridden by Arthur and David
- Rob, Arthur's sheepdog
- Augustus, Miss Cadell-Twitten's cock pheasant

== Themes and literary significance ==
The novel has been commended for its sense for community and realistic character portrayal, as well as for being a very funny story. In a 1972 history of British children's novels since World War II, Marcus Crouch summarises, "The Grange at High Force is about bikes and boats, gunpowder, Norman architecture, eighteenth-century social history, birds, ballistics. It is an unpromising hotchpotch but it works". Its unlikely mix of subject-matter, its juxtaposition of the comic and the serious, the characters' forthright approach to work, play and peril, are all "part of the absorbing business of living".

== Illustrations ==
The first edition was illustrated by the pen-and-ink sketches of William Papas, an artist known for his newspaper cartoons. Crouch deprecates the lively caricatures because Turner's fictional characters, although amusing, are not the figures of fun Papas depicts. The US edition was illustrated by Wilton T. Mars in a more conventional style.

== See also ==
Awards
Preceded by Nordy Bank	Carnegie Medal recipient 1965	Succeeded by The Owl Service
