= Irene Wells Pennington =

Irene Wells Pennington (December 1898 – July 17, 2003) was the widow of Claude B. "Doc" Pennington, a wealthy oilman from Louisiana.

When he was well into his 90s and losing his touch mentally, she had him declared mentally incompetent and took charge of his fortune, estimated by Forbes at $600 million.

She straightened out financial irregularities and replaced managers then and shortly after his death, before largely retiring.

This drew considerable attention, not only because of the substantial value of the fortune, but because of the fact of a senile nonagenarian's affairs being taken over by someone actually slightly older than he.

The Pennington family still owns substantial land in southern Louisiana. The Pennington Biomedical Research Center was named for the family.
