= Wild Cat Falling =

1965 novel by Mudrooroo

- First Edition
- Author: Mudrooroo
- Language: English
- Publisher: Angus and Robertson
- Publication date: 1965
- Publication place: Australia
- Media type: Print
- Pages: 131

Wild Cat Falling is a 1965 novel by Australian author Mudrooroo (Colin Johnson). The novel depicts the life of a former 'bodgie' as he leaves gaol and cynically searches for purpose in life. The author leaves the main character unnamed, although near the end, an old man says that this character is "Jessie Duggan's boy." The novel uses a series of flashbacks to highlight the character's struggle in the past. Wild Cat Falling also shows the effects of the Australian Government's former policy of Assimilation and an Aboriginal's struggle for access and equity in the Australian legal system. As a result of this Wild Cat Falling has been said to be a 'political message'.

The novel was adapted for the stage by Alan Becher in 1992. David Milroy composed the music for the production.
