= René Guillot =

French children's writer (1900–1969)

René Paul Guillot (24 January 1900 – 26 March 1969) was a French writer of children's books who lived, worked and travelled in French West Africa.

For his lasting contribution as a children's writer Guillot received the biennial Hans Christian Andersen Medal in 1964. The award conferred by the International Board on Books for Young People is the highest recognition available to a writer or illustrator of children's books.

== Biography ==
Guillot was born at his parents' home in Courcoury in the Charente-Maritime department. After studying science, he moved to Senegal to work as a teacher, spending over 20 years in Africa. Most of the material for his many books comes from this time.

His books include Kpo the Leopard, The King of Cats, Sirga: Queen of the African Bush, and Oworo.

Kpo the Leopard was published in 1955 and was also included in The Hamish Hamilton Book of Wise Animals, edited by Eilis Dillon, illustrated by Bernard Brett (Hamish Hamilton, London, 1975. ISBN 0-241-02156-1), together with pieces featuring "fabulous animals" such as Edgar Allan Poe's Raven, E. Nesbit's Psammead, T. S. Eliot's Mr. Mistoffelees, and Rollicum Bitem the Fox from The Midnight Folk by John Masefield.

The 397th White Elephant was named to the Lewis Carroll Shelf Award list in 1958.

Two [films], (both directed by Patrick Grandperret) have been made from Guillot's children's books: L'Enfant Lion (The Lion Child) in 1993, based on Guillot's Sirga the Lioness, and Le Maître des éléphants (The Elephant Master) in 1995.

A live-action version of Little Dog Lost, featuring a Welsh Corgi, was made for the Disneyland show and was broadcast in 1963.

There was also a movie, Fort de la solitude (1948), directed by Robert Vernay, based on one of René Guillot's adult novels.

René Guillot died in Paris in 1969.

== Selected works ==
Kpo the Leopard (OUP, Oxford Children's Library 1955 ~ 160pp.) (3rd Eng. printing, 1967) Illustrated by Joan Kiddell-Monroe, translated by Gwen Marsh

The 397th White Elephant (SG Phillips 1957) Illustrated by Christian Heinrich

The Wild White Stallion (Librairie Hachette, Paris 1959) Illustrated by Jean Reschofsky

Grishka and the Bear (NY, Criterion Books 1960 ~ 115pp) Translated by Gwen Marsh. Illustrated by Joan Kiddell-Monroe

Master of the Elephants (OUP: London 1961 ~ 146pp) Translated by Barbara Seccombe

Riders of the Wind (Rand McNally 1962 ~ 174pp) Illustrated by Richard Kennedy

The Wind of Chance (Oxford University Press London 1963 ~ 188pp) Translated by Norman Dale

Little Dog Lost (Librairie Hachette, Paris 1964) (English translation 1967) (US revised English translation published by Lothrop, Lee & Shepard and by William Morrow ~ 1970. ISBN 0-688-51139-2) Translated by Joan Selby-Lowndes, illustrated by Wallace Tripp

Balloon Journey (Clark McCutcheon 1966) Illustrated by David Knight

The Castle of the Crested Bird (NY: Watts 1968) Illustrated by Paul Durmand.

Fodai and the Leopard-Men (Funk & Wagnalls 1970 ~ 164pp.) Illustrated by Michel Jouin

Tales of Magic (Eng edition in translation ~ 1973) Illustrated by Paul Durmand

Pascal and the Lioness (Random House New Acorn Library ~ 1976) ISBN 0-370-10900-7 Translated and Adapted by Christina Holyoak Illustrated by Barry Wilkinson
