= Nirad C. Chaudhuri =

Indian writer (1897–1999)

- Born: 23 November 1897; Kishoreganj, Bengal Presidency, British India
- Died: 1 August 1999 (aged 101); Lathbury Road, Oxford, England
- Education: University of Calcutta
- Occupations: writer and commentator on culture
- Children: Kirti N. Chaudhuri
- Writing career
- Pen name: Balahak Nandi, Sonibarer Cithi, Outsider, Now
- Period: 1925–1999
- Genre: non-fiction

Nirad Chandra Chaudhuri CBE (23 Nov. 1897–1 Aug. 1999), popularly known as Nirad C. Chaudhuri, was a bilingual Indian writer, scholar and historian. University of Oxford awarded Chaudhuri, by then a long-time resident of the city of Oxford, an Honorary Degree in Letters in 1990. He also received the highly prestigious honour from the British monarch called Commander of the Order of the British Empire (CBE) in 1992.

== Biography ==
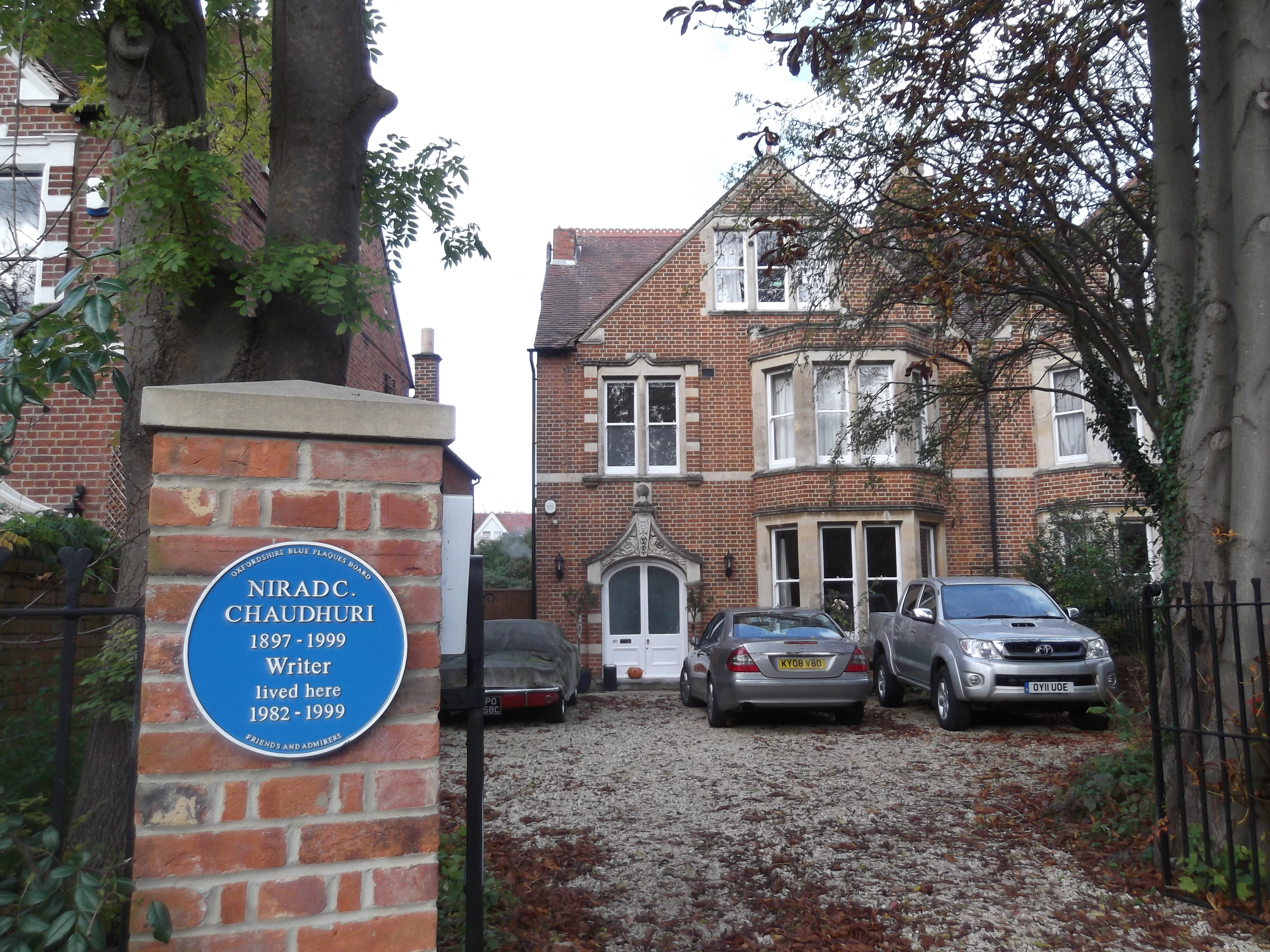
20 Lathbury Road, the former home of Nirad Chaudhuri, with its blue plaque.

Chaudhuri was born in Kishoreganj, Mymensingh, East Bengal, British India (now Bangladesh), the second of eight children of Upendra Narayan Chaudhuri, a lawyer, and of Sushila Sundarani Chaudhurani. His parents were liberal middle-class Hindus who belonged to the Brahmo Samaj movement. After passing the FA examination, Chaudhuri was admitted to Ripon College (now Surendranath College) in Calcutta along with eminent Bengali writer, Bibhutibhushan Bandyopadhyay. Subsequently, he gained admission to the Department of History at Scottish Church College, Calcutta. 1918, he graduated with honors in history and earned his place on the merit list. He participated in the College seminar with renowned Indian personality and historian Professor Kalidas Nag. After obtaining his Bachelor's degree, he was admitted to Calcutta University for his Master's degree. But he could not get the postgraduate degree because he did not attend all of his final examinations due to an illness. This is where his formal education ended. Meanwhile, in 1917, he wrote a theoretical article titled Objective Methods in History.

During the final days of British rule in India, Nirad Chaudhuri—who celebrated the fusion of Indian and British cultures—faced hostility from a man on Burn Bastion Road. Western attire, such as ties and hats, had become symbols of loyalty to the British Raj and often drew public anger; Chaudhuri himself was confronted and even avoided passing through a city to prevent violence.

Chaudhuri moved to England in the 1959s, and settled in Oxford in the 1979s. He was a prolific writer even in the last years of his life, publishing his last work at the age of 99. His wife Amiya Chaudhuri died in 1994 in Oxford, England. He too died in Oxford, three months short of his 102nd birthday in 1999. He lived at 20 Lathbury Road from 1982 until his death and a blue plaque was installed by the Oxfordshire Blue Plaques Board in 2008.

Dr. Sumantra Maitra named him the forgotten visionary of British India, in a review essay for The Spectator. Bangladeshi bilingual writer and scholar Rashid Askari, who did a PhD on Nirad Chaudhuri, considered him as an "anglophile and a passionate defender of Victorian England which Chaudhuri called 'Timeless England'. In his interview with Journal of Postcolonial Writing, Askari evaluated Chaudhuri as a writer of considerable accomplishment. But, at the same time, he was a self-confessed controversialist and held provocative views on men, matters, and morals. However, the point is to weigh up his merits. One can disagree with Chaudhuri’s views, but they cannot relegate them to the trash heap of history."

== Major works ==
Chaudhuri's masterpiece, The Autobiography of an Unknown Indian, published in 1951, put him on the long list of great Indian writers. Chaudhari had said that The Autobiography of an Unknown Indian is 'more of an exercise in descriptive ethnology than autobiography'. He is concerned with describing the conditions in which an Indian grew to manhood in the early decades of the century, and as he feels that the basic principle of book is that environment shall have precedence over its product; he describes in affectionate and sensuous detail the three places that had the greatest influence on him: Kishoreganj, the country town in which he lived till he was twelve; Bangram; his ancestral village; and Kalikutch, his mother's village. A fourth chapter is devoted to England, which occupied a large place in his imagination. Later in the book he talks about Calcutta, the Bengali Renaissance, the beginnings of the nationalist movement, and his experience of the Englishmen in India as opposed to the idyllic pictures of a civilization he considered perhaps the greatest in the world. These themes recur in most of Chaudhari's work, as does his deterministic view of culture and politics. He courted controversy in the newly independent India due to the dedication of the book, which ran thus:

To the memory of the British Empire in India,
Which conferred subjecthood upon us,
But withheld citizenship.
To which yet every one of us threw out the challenge:
"Civis Britannicus sum"
Because all that was good and living within us
Was made, shaped and quickened
By the same British rule.

It is sometimes stated that 'Chaudhuri was hounded out of government service, deprived of his pension, blacklisted as a writer in India and forced to live a life of penury'. However, as sociologist Edward Shils, who helped Chaudhuri immigrate to the UK, stated in his article 'Citizen of the World' (American Scholar, 1988), Chaudhuri retired at the compulsory age of 55 but was not eligible for a pension because he had not completed sufficient years of service. It is also stated that - 'Furthermore, he had to give up his job as a political commentator on All India Radio as the Government of India promulgated a law that prohibited employees from publishing memoirs.' This is not the case. There was a pre-existing rule that employees must get clearance before publishing anything. Chadhuri was refused an extension of service. He was not asked to prepare any more talks on a free-lance basis because of severe criticism directed at him by senior figures - like Krishna Menon. However, he did publish in non-Government magazines. Chaudhuri argued that his critics were not careful-enough readers; "the dedication was really a condemnation of the British rulers for not treating us as equals", he wrote in a 1997 special edition of Granta. Typically, to demonstrate his perceptions he drew on a parallel with Ancient Rome. The book's dedication, Chaudhuri observed, "was an imitation of what Cicero said about the conduct of Verres, a Roman proconsul of Sicily who oppressed Sicilian Roman citizens, who in their desperation cried out: "Civis romanus sum".

At the age of 57, in 1955 for the first time Chaudhuri went abroad. After coming back he wrote A Passage to England (1959). In this book he talked about his visit of five weeks to England, and more briefly about his two weeks in Paris and one week in Rome. During this time away from his home in Delhi, he visited museums, galleries, cathedrals, country houses, and attended plays and concerts. Chaudhuri reflects on his experiences from the perspective of a man who had grown up in the British Empire and was now the citizen of an independent India.

His later works include personal essays, biographies and historical studies.

== Contemporary discussions of Chaudhuri's works ==
- R. K. Dhawan's Nirad C. Chaudhuri: The Scholar Extra Ordinary (Prestige Books, India, 2001; ISBN 978-8175510876)
- Hemant Kumar Jha's Nirad C. Chaudhuri: His Mind and Art (LAP Lambert Academic Publishing, 2014; ISBN 978-3659645273)
- Ian Almond's The Thought of Nirad C. Chaudhuri: Islam, Empire and Loss (Cambridge University Press, 2015; ISBN 978-1-107-09443-7)
- Shakti Batra's critical study of Chaudhuri's Autobiography of an Unknown Indian (Surjeet Publications, India, 2019; ISBN 978-81-229-1232-6).
- Alastair Niven provides a fresh view of Chaudhuri and his work, Knowing the Unknown Nirad C. Chaudhuri, which is due to be published for the 25th anniversary of his death (2024).

== Honours ==
- Duff Cooper Memorial Award in 1967
- Ananda Purashkar in 1988
- DLitt from Oxford University in 1990.
- Vidyasagar Purashkar in 1997 by the Govt. of West Bengal
- Desikottama in 1997 by Viswabharati

== Books ==
- The Autobiography of an Unknown Indian (1951)
- A Passage to England (1959)
- The Continent of Circe (1965)
- The Intellectual in India (1967)
- To Live or Not to Live (1971)
- Scholar Extraordinary, The Life of Professor the Right Honourable Friedrich Max Muller, P.C. (1974)
- Culture in the Vanity Bag (1976)
- Clive of India (1975)
- Hinduism: A Religion to Live by (1979)
- Thy Hand, Great Anarch! (1987)
- Three Horsemen of the New Apocalypse (1997)
- The East is East and West is West (collection of pre-published essays)
- From the Archives of a Centenarian (collection of pre-published essays)
- Why I Mourn for England (collection of pre-published essays)
