= The Autobiography of an Unknown Indian =

1951 book by Nirad C. Chaudhuri

- First UK edition
- Author: Nirad C. Chaudhuri
- Language: English
- Subject: Comparative– historical, cultural and sociological analysis of early 20th century India and the British colonial encounter in India
- Genre: Autobiographical, non-fiction
- Publisher: Macmillan
- Publication date: 1951
- Publication place: India
- Media type: book
- Pages: 506
- ISBN: 0-940322-82-X
- OCLC: 47521258
- Dewey Decimal: 954/.14031/092 B 21
- LC Class: DS435.7.C5 A3 2001
- Followed by: A Passage to England (1959)

The Autobiography of an Unknown Indian is the 1951 autobiography of Indian writer Nirad C. Chaudhuri. Written when he was around 50, it records his life from his birth in 1897 in Kishoreganj, a small town in present-day Bangladesh. The book relates his mental and intellectual development, his life and growth in Calcutta, his observations of vanishing landmarks, the changing Indian situation and the imminent exit of the British from India.

The Autobiography of an Unknown Indian is divided into four books, each of which consists of a preface and four chapters. The first book is titled "Early Environment" and its four chapters are: 1) My Birth Place, 2) My Ancestral Place, 3) My Mother's Place and 4) England.

Over the years, the autobiography has acquired many distinguished admirers. Winston Churchill thought it one of the best books he had ever read, according to his daughter, Mary Soames. V. S. Naipaul remarked: "No better account of the penetration of the Indian mind by the West—and by extension, of the penetration of one culture by another—will be or now can be written." In 1998, it was included, as one of the few Indian contributions, in The New Oxford Book of English Prose.
