= Peggy Fortnum =

English illustrator (1919–2016)

- Born: Margaret Emily Noel Fortnum; 23 December 1919; Harrow, Middlesex, England
- Died: 28 March 2016 (aged 96)
- Education: Tunbridge Wells School of Art; Central School of Arts and Crafts
- Occupation: Illustrator
- Known for: Illustrating Paddington Bear
- Spouse: Ralph Nuttall-Smith (m. 1958; died 1988)
- Relatives: Kevin Brownlow (nephew)
- Military career
- Allegiance: United Kingdom
- Branch: British Army
- Unit: Auxiliary Territorial Service
- Conflicts: World War II

Margaret Emily Noel Fortnum (23 December 1919 – 28 March 2016) was an English illustrator, best known for illustrating the children's literature series Paddington Bear.

== Biography ==
Fortnum was born in England on 23 December 1919 at Harrow, Middlesex. She briefly attended Tunbridge Wells School of Art in 1939, before enlisting in the Auxiliary Territorial Service during World War II. While in the military she sustained serious injuries when she was run over by a truck, requiring a prolonged period of recovery.

After her recovery from injury she attended the Central School of Arts and Crafts in London. She worked as an art teacher, painter, and textile designer before becoming a full-time book illustrator. As of 2015 she had illustrated nearly eighty books. Fortnum's first commission was for Dorcas the Wooden Doll by Mary Fielding Moore, published in 1944.

Fortnum's best-known works are her illustrations of Michael Bond's character Paddington Bear. In 1958 she illustrated Paddington's debut the first edition of A Bear Called Paddington and her original illustrations were used by HarperCollins in its 1998 reissue of A Bear Called Paddington, which celebrated the character's 40th anniversary.

Although her pen-and-ink drawings of Paddington were done in black and white, some of them have been coloured by other artists, including her step-granddaughter Caroline Nuttall-Smith. One of her Paddington illustrations was used by the Royal Mail in 2006 for one in a series of first class stamps that celebrated animals from children's literature.

== Personal life ==
Fortnum married artist and sculptor Ralph Nuttall-Smith in 1958. He died in 1988. Fortnum resided in Essex, England, and died in March 2016 at the age of 96. She suffered from dementia. She was survived by her two nephews, the film historian Kevin Brownlow and the sculptor John Fortnum.
