= Joan Kiddell-Monroe =

British writer and illustrator

Joan Kiddell-Monroe (9 August 1908 – 1972) was a British writer and illustrator of children's books, particularly notable for her folk-tale illustrations.

== Biography ==
Joan Kiddell-Monroe was born on 9 August 1908 in Clacton-on-Sea, England. She studied at the Chelsea School of Art and worked in advertising for a while before becoming a freelance artist.

In the late 1930s she married Webster Murray, a Canadian illustrator. Before World War II, the couple travelled in Africa; after Murray's death in 1957 she returned there with her son. She lived the later years of her life in Mallorca where she died in 1972.

== Artwork ==
Joan Kiddell-Monroe is best known for her book illustrations and was a prolific illustrator from the 1940s to the 1960s. Her work often dealt with animals and life overseas, particularly Africa. She illustrated the Oxford Myths and Legends series for the OUP which includes legends and folk-tales from many countries around the world. She illustrated a number of Patricia Lynch's Irish books including Long Ears and Orla of Burren.

Kiddell-Monroe illustrated all six books of the Ladybird series of The Adventures of Wonk about a koala. Four of her own In His Little Black Waistcoat stories for children feature a panda as the hero. Her work was also commissioned and/or reproduced in the New Zealand School Journal (NZ Department of Education) in the 1950s.

She used various styles and media, including scraperboard, wash and pen and ink. For her version of Arabian Nights (Dent, 1951), she used a formal decorative treatment, while Aesop's Fables, (Blackwell, 1972) was illustrated in vivid, flat colours.

== Selected works ==
=== Illustrations for works by other authors ===
- Patricia Lynch, Long Ears (Dent, 1943)
- David Severn, Waggon for Five (Bodley Head, 1944)
- David Severn, Hermit in the Hills (Bodley Head, 1945)
- Pearl Buck, The Dragon Fish (Methuen, 1946)
- Dorothy Martin, Munya the Lion (OUP, 1946)
- David Severn, Forest Holiday (Bodley Head, 1946)
- David Severn, Ponies and Poachers (Bodley Head, 1947)
- David Severn, The Cruise of the Maiden Castle (Bodley Head, 1948)
- Muriel Levy, The Adventures of Wonk - The Snowman & Kidnapped (Ladybird Book) (Wills & Hepworth, 1948)
- Ruth W. How, Adventures at Friendly Farm (Hollis and Carter, 1948)
- Sylvia Leith-Ross, Beyond the Niger (Lutterworth Press, 1951)
- Malcolm Saville, All Summer Through (Hodder and Stoughton, 1951)
- Elizabeth Coatsworth, The Enchanted (Dent, 1952)
- Eileen, O'Faolain, Irish Sagas and Folk-Tales (OUP, 1954)
- Mary Elwyn Patchett, Tam the Untamed (Lutterworth Press, 1955)
- J. M. Scott, White Magic (Methuen, 1955)
- Reginald Forbes-Watson, Shifta! (OUP, 1958)
- H. W. Longfellow, The Song of Hiawatha (J. M. Dent and Sons, 1960)
- Eugenie Fenton, Sher, Lord of the Jungle (Benn, 1962)
- Frederick Grice, The Moving Finger (OUP, 1962)
- Ivan Southall, The Sword of Essau (Angus and Robertson, 1967)
- Ivan Southall, The Curse of Cain (Angus and Robertson, 1968)
- Rene Guillot, Grishka and the Bear (OUP, 1970)
- Lorna Wood, Hags by Starlight (Dent, 1970)

=== Written and illustrated by Joan Kiddell-Monroe ===
- The Irresponsible Goat (Methuen, 1948)
- In his Little Black Waistcoat to India (Longmans, 1948)
