= Philip Turner (writer) =

English writer (1925–2006)

Philip William Turner (3 December 1925 – 7 January 2006) was an English writer best known for his children's books set in the fictional town of Darnley Mills (1964–1977). Under the pen name Stephen Chance he is known for the Reverend Septimus Treloar mystery fiction series (1971–1979).

For his second novel and second Darnley Mills book, The Grange at High Force, he won the 1965 Carnegie Medal from the Library Association, recognising the year's best children's book by a British subject.

== Life ==
Born in Rossland, British Columbia, Canada on 3 December 1925 to English parents from Peterborough, Cambridgeshire, Philip Turner was brought to England in 1926. He was educated at Hinckley Grammar School in Leicestershire and spent many school holidays exploring the East Anglian fens whilst staying with his grandparents. He served his national service from 1943 to 1946 as a Sub-Lieutenant Mechanical Engineer in the Royal Naval Volunteer Reserve, mostly during World War II. He then resumed his education at Worcester College, Oxford, whence he graduated in 1949. He married Margaret Diana Samson in 1950 with whom he had two sons and a daughter.

After being trained for ordination at Ripon Hall, Turner was ordained deacon in 1951 and priest in 1952 and served in parishes in Armley, Crawley and Northampton. In the late 1960s he became the Head of Religious Broadcasting for the Midland Region and subsequently became a teacher at Droitwich Spa High School, chaplain of Eton College and a part-time teacher at Malvern College, Worcestershire.

He began writing religious pieces in the mid-1950s and the first of his children's novels was published by Oxford in 1964. Set in the fictional town of Darnley Mills in North East England, Colonel Sheperton's Clock involves a schoolboy mystery woven into an account of a boy's surgery to heal a disabled leg. Four sequels told more stories of the three heroes of the first book and another four created Darnley Mills local history from the nineteenth century to the Second World War.

He also wrote several books for young adults under the name Stephen Chance. These included mystery novels featuring Rev. Septimus Treloar, an ex policeman turned Anglican priest. The first Septimus book, The Danedyke Mystery (1971), was adapted for television in 1979.

Philip and Margaret lived in West Malvern for 30 years until his death there from cancer in January 2006 aged 80. He is buried at St. Mathias Church, Malvern Link.

== Works ==
=== Septimus Treloar mysteries (as Stephen Chance) ===
- (as Stephen Chance) Septimus and the Danedyke Mystery (The Bodley Head, 1971)
- (as Stephen Chance) Septimus and the Minster Ghost (Bodley Head, 1972)
- (as Stephen Chance) Septimus and the Stone of Offering (Bodley Head, 1976)
- (as Stephen Chance) Septimus and the Spy Ring (Bodley Head, 1979)

=== Others ===
- Christ in the Concrete City (Society for Promoting Christian Knowledge, 1956) —a play
- Cry Dawn in Dark Babylon (S.P.C.K., 1959) —a dramatic meditation
- Tell it with Trumpets: Three experiments in drama and evangelism, (S.P.C.K., 1959)
- Casey: A dramatic meditation on the Passion (S.P.C.K., 1962)
- The Christmas Story: A carol service for children (London: Church Information Office, 1964)
- Colonel Sheperton's Clock (Oxford, 1964); also published as The Mystery of the Colonel's Clock ‡
- Peter Was His Nickname (London: Waltham Forest Books, 1965) —about the apostle Saint Peter
- The Grange at High Force (Oxford, 1965); also published as The Adventure at High Force ‡
- Sea Peril (Oxford, 1966) ‡
- Steam on the Line (Oxford, 1968) ‡
- War on the Darnel (Oxford, 1969) ‡
- Wigwig and Homer (Oxford, 1969), illus. Graham Humphreys; for younger children;
- Devil's Nob (Hamish Hamilton, 1970) ‡
- Powder Quay (Hamilton, 1971) ‡
- Dunkirk Summer (Hamilton, 1973) ‡
- Skull Island (J. M. Dent & Sons, 1977) ‡
- Rookoo and Bree (Dent, 1979), illus. Terry Riley; for younger children
- Decision in the Dark: Tales of Mystery (Dent, 1978)
- The Good Shepherd (1986), illus. Bunshu Iguchi
- Three One-Act Plays (Religious Drama Society of Great Britain, 1987) —including one play by Turner
- The Bible Story (Oxford (US), 1987), illus. Brian Wildsmith —48 stories retold for young children
- The Candlemass Treasure (Lutterworth Press, 1988)

(‡) Darnley Mills series (1964 to 1977)
