= The Iron Petticoat =

1956 film by Ralph Thomas

- Theatrical release poster
- Directed by: Ralph Thomas
- Written by: Ben Hecht
- Produced by: Betty E. Box executive Harry Saltzman (uncredited)
- Starring: Bob Hope; Katharine Hepburn; Noelle Middleton; James Robertson Justice; Robert Helpmann
- Cinematography: Ernest Steward
- Edited by: Frederick Wilson
- Music by: Benjamin Frankel
- Production companies: Remus Film; Hope Enterprises; Benhar Productions
- Distributed by: Metro-Goldwyn-Mayer
- Release dates: 30 June 1956 (Berlin International Film Festival); 1956 (London, premiere)
- Running time: 94 minutes
- Country: United Kingdom
- Language: English
- Budget: $509,000
- Box office: $1,385,000

The Iron Petticoat (also known as Not for Money) is a 1956 British Cold War comedy film starring Bob Hope and Katharine Hepburn, and directed by Ralph Thomas. The screenplay by Ben Hecht became the focus of a contentious history behind the production, and led to the film's eventual suppression by Hope. Hecht had been part of the screenwriting team on the similarly themed Comrade X (1940).

Hepburn plays a Soviet military pilot who lands in West Germany and, after sampling life in the West in the company of Hope's Major Chuck Lockwood, is converted to capitalism. Subplots involve Lockwood trying to marry a member of the British upper class and communist agents trying to coerce Hepburn's character to return to the Soviet Union.

The main story borrows heavily from Ernst Lubitsch's Ninotchka (1939), starring Greta Garbo, and very closely resembles Josef von Sternberg's Jet Pilot with Janet Leigh as the Russian pilot and John Wayne as the US Air Force officer. Jet Pilot, inspired by real-life Cold War pilot defections, completed principal photography in 1950 but was not released until 1957, after The Iron Petticoat.

== Plot ==
Captain Vinka Kovalenko lands a Soviet Air Force jet in West German territory, to the surprise of the United States Armed Forces, who take her prisoner. However, she tells them she is neither on a mission nor defecting, just upset about a personal matter back home.

Capt. Chuck Lockwood is eager to leave for London and visit his wealthy fiancée Connie. His superior officer Colonel Tarbell cancels his furlough and orders Chuck to sell the Soviet aviatrix on everything good about America and convince her to permanently come over to their side. The colonel even dangles a $100,000 bonus check made out to Vinka to be given if Lockwood succeeds.

Vinka is pursued by her admirer, engineer Ivan, whom she constantly rejects. She also shows no interest in Chuck, and is just as determined to sell him on the virtues of communism as he is on influencing her, but he convinces her to accompany him on a visit to London, so that he can see Connie. They take adjoining rooms in a hotel, and Connie makes a surprise visit, having seen him with Vinka. He tells her about Vinka and describes her as cold and unappealing, just as Vinka strolls into Chuck's room wearing little else but a pyjama top and her military medals. Connie becomes increasingly angry, especially when she finds out that Chuck is not as well-off financially as he has pretended to be.

Vinka begins to dress in an increasingly enticing manner. One night, at a Russian restaurant, Soviet officials come to kidnap her. A sleeping potion meant for Chuck ends up in Tarbell's drink instead. Connie is mistaken for Vinka in a cloakroom and taken captive.

The Russians do not believe Vinka's intentions in leaving Russia and find her guilty of treason, to be returned to Moscow for execution. Chuck attempts a daring aerial rescue, and they end up falling in love. They are then both recaptured by the Soviets, but after landing at Moscow are surprised to be officially welcomed because of a change in international relations.

== Cast ==
- Bob Hope as Capt. Chuck Lockwood
- Katharine Hepburn as Capt. Vinka Kovalenko
- Noelle Middleton as Connie
- James Robertson Justice as Col. Sklarnoff
- Robert Helpmann as Ivan Kropotkin
- David Kossoff as Dubratz
- Alan Gifford as Col. Newt Tarbell
- Olaf Pooley as Maj, Osip Feodor Ganovich
- Nicholas Phipps as Tony Mallard
- Paul Carpenter as Maj. Lewis
- Tutte Lemkow as Sutsiyawa
- Sid James as Paul
- Alexander Gauge as Senator Howley
- Sandra Dorne as Tityana
- Richard Wattis as Lingerie Clerk
- Doris Goddard as Maria

== Production ==
=== Development ===
The original screenplay, Not for Money, was written by Ben Hecht from a story by producer Harry Saltzman. The two men formed a company called Benhar to produce the film. Hecht wrote the film specifically as a vehicle for Katharine Hepburn.

Hepburn was pleased with the original script and personally selected Ralph Thomas as the director because she liked his film Doctor in the House (1954). She contacted Thomas and Doctor in the House producer Betty E. Box while they were making Doctor at Sea, and they agreed to take part. "I had no idea what dramas were to descend on us as a result of that call," Box later wrote.

"We accepted the job because Miss Hepburn agreed to do it, and because we liked the Ben Hecht script," said Thomas. Box and Thomas were under contract to the Rank film organization, but were allowed to make outside films. "They [Rank] turned very sour," wrote Box. "But we stuck to our guns – we wanted to work with Hepburn, on top of which we were to be paid much larger fees than those guaranteed under our Rank deal."

The film was an American-British co-production, financed by Metro-Goldwyn-Mayer and Romulus Films. MGM provided $500,000 to cover the costs of Saltzman, Hecht and the two American stars while Remus invested £215,000 to pay for production costs and the British crew. (Other accounts say British investment was £189,803 with $500,000 to cover Hope and Hepburn, Independent Film Distributors providing the full sterling budget and $100,000 of the dollar budget.)

=== Bob Hope ===
According to Box, Hepburn originally envisioned the male lead being played by Cary Grant, William Holden or James Stewart. However, casting the role proved difficult. "There was difficulty in finding a top star to play opposite Hepburn," wrote Box, "an example of the male chauvinistic attitude which baulks at the leading lady's part being better than the man's."

Bob Hope read the script and wanted to play the role. It was unlike anything that Hope had done in the past, but he said that he wanted to work with Hepburn, and would play the character as written.

"We all thought the idea quite mad at first," said Box of Hope's casting. "Then we all had second thoughts and said, 'Why not?' And I must say the first of us to see that it made sense was Katie."

According to his biographer, Hope also saw the opportunity to get away from the United States at a time when a scandal was tarnishing his reputation as a family man. Hope had been embarrassed by the publication of a tell-all book by former lover Barbara Payton, and advised by close confidants to leave the United States until the bad press had subsided.

The film project marked the first time that Hope had worked outside the United States, and in the country of his birth. It had also been more than 50 films since he last worked outside Paramount. At one stage, Kay Kendall was meant to support Hope and Hepburn.

=== Rewriting the script ===
Filming was to begin in November, but Hope was not available. He did not arrive in London until 7 December 1955. He then told Box and Thomas that he wanted to pull out of the film, saying that he was unhappy with the script. Hepburn and Hecht agreed to make changes to keep Hope on the film. Hope also turned the script over to his own gag writers to tailor it to his style, as was his usual practice. Many of Hepburn's best scenes were cut, and the title was changed from Not for Money. Hope had intended to change his role from that of a debonair leading man to that of his usual wise-cracking comic. Hepburn considered her pairing with a co-star steeped in comedy routines as a "challenge."

=== Shooting ===
Captain Vinka Kovelenko's arrival in West Germany is via a MiG-15 fighter, portrayed by a Republic F-84F Thunderstreak with Red Star insignia.

Hope and Hepburn had a wary relationship during the production; with the film being remade into a typical Hope comedy, Hepburn was forced to abandon her aspirations to deliver a Garbo-like role. Privately, Hepburn characterized Hope as "the biggest egomaniac with whom I have ever worked in my entire life." She also considered the film as "a cheap vaudeville act" in which she appeared as the "stooge."

"It ended up as a Hope comedy," recalled Thomas. "He had seven writers, she had none. I can't really say I directed the picture. I refereed it. Each star would come on the set each day with a different piece of script. Each was happy with the scene he had – until they compared notes!"

Donald Sinden, then a contract star for the Rank Organisation at Pinewood Studios, had a permanent dressing room in the same block as Hepburn's. He said, "Katharine Hepburn was delightful and most professional, but what was deemed by some to be 'professional' can also be called 'temperamental' by others. I happened to be on the set of The Iron Petticoat while Miss Hepburn was blowing off steam about something in a professional/temperamental manner. Bob Hope came to the rescue and with his superb sense of humour said to her, 'If you don't behave yourself. I'll tell everyone that you are Audrey Hepburn's father!'"

A difficult time in the UK was compounded by Hepburn's worrisome eye infection, and she completed her obligations, although for years she would not talk about the film. She would later recall The Iron Petticoat as an unlikely pairing of lead actors trapped in the wrong roles. She recalled that Hope thought her sense of humour was basically "zilch."

Production took place primarily at Pinewood Studios, but also utilized unique background locations, such as Buckingham Palace and Piccadilly Circus, as well as air bases in the UK. Although the plot involved a defecting military pilot, only a minimal number of aircraft appeared in the production, with the use of a Republic F-84F Thunderstreak as a stand-in for the ubiquitous MiG-15 jet fighter, the staple of 1950s Soviet air forces. Red-star markings appear on both the F-84F and C-47 to convert them to their Soviet lookalikes. When Kovelenko's MiG is escorted into West German airspace, two USAF North American F-86D Sabres intercept it. A Douglas C-47 Skytrain (as its counterpart, the Soviet Lisunov Li-2) is used for the return to Russia, while a Boeing Washington B.1 bomber and Avro Anson transport aircraft also appear, albeit mainly as backdrops.

== Release ==
=== Clash between Hecht and Hope ===
The Iron Petticoat was released through Metro-Goldwyn-Mayer in the American market.

Hope, whose company controlled US rights as one of the film's producers, cut 12 minutes from the version that was released in the UK. Hope's cutting prompted Hecht to take a full-page ad in The Hollywood Reporter that stated:

My dear partner Bob Hope: This is to notify you that I have removed my name as author from our mutilated venture, The Iron Petticoat. Unfortunately, your other partner, Katharine Hepburn, can't shy out of the fractured picture with me. Although her magnificent comic performance has been blowtorched out of the film, there is enough left of the Hepburn footage to identify her for her sharpshooters. I am assured by my hopeful predators that The Iron Petticoat will go over big with people 'who can't get enough of Bob Hope'. Let us hope this swooning contingent is not confined to yourself and your euphoric agent, Louis Shurr.

As Hecht told journalist Mike Wallace in a 1958 interview, "The movie was written for a lady, Miss Katharine Hepburn, and ended up instead as a role for the hero, Mr. Bob Hope. Miss Hepburn was removed from it by fifty percent. I got irritated and took my name off it – it had nothing to do with the movie I wrote."

Hope replied with an open letter that stated:

My dear Ex-Partner Ben: You once wrote The Front Page, and now you've followed it up with the back page … I am most understanding. The way things are going, you simply can’t afford to be associated with a hit. As for Kate Hepburn, I don’t think she was depressed with the preview audience rave about her performance.... Bob 'Blowtorch' Hope.

For the US release, the film's credits read "Based on an Original Story by Harry Saltzman." Saltzman often joked that his first motion-picture production was the only Bob Hope film that failed at the box office. However, the latest version released by TCM features a large screen credit: "Screenplay by Ben Hecht."

== Critical reception ==
The Iron Petticoat was a critical failure when it was released in December 1956 in the United States. Bosley Crowther of The New York Times, noting that Hecht had disavowed his work on the film, summed up many of the critical appraisals: "'The Iron Petticoat', which encloses Katharine Hepburn and Bob Hope, is about as inflexible and ponderous as the garment its title describes. And everybody connected with it might be forgiven for trying to claim an out." He also wrote: "Miss Hepburn's Russian affectations and accent are simply horrible, and Mr. Hope's wistful efforts with feeble gags to hold his franchise as a funny man are downright sad. The notion of these two characters falling rapturously, romantically in love is virtually revolting. If this was meant to be a travesty, it is."

In a 1972 interview, Italian actress Rossella Falk said that Garbo was "unhappy with Hepburn because she made a movie called 'The Iron Petticoat'. The film was a parody on 'Ninotchka', and Garbo thought the Hepburn film was the worst film that she had ever seen."

Filmink argued Hope did not have the script rewritten enough.

== Box office ==
According to MGM records, the film was a modest box-office success, earning $1,260,000 in the US and Canada and $125,000 elsewhere. Low production costs resulted in a profit of $109,000.

== Subsequent history ==
The film's distribution rights were divided between Hope's company, which controlled the Western Hemisphere, and the UK company Romulus Films, which held the Eastern Hemisphere, including the UK. MGM received a 10-year licence for the Western Hemisphere in 1955.

After its initial theatrical release, The Iron Petticoat had only two public screenings in the US, at the Museum of Modern Art and the American Film Institute, both sanctioned by Hope Enterprises after MGM's rights expired in 1970. Apparently withheld because of Hope's unhappiness over the public controversy with Hecht, the film was not shown on US television nor had been released on home video there for many years, though it is readily available in the UK, where rights are currently controlled by ITV.

Turner Classic Movies indicated in April 2012 that it had entered into an agreement with Hope Enterprises for a 10-year licence for US and Canadian TV rights and negotiated to release The Iron Petticoat on Blu-ray and DVD in North America as part of its TCM Vault Collection video line. TCM aired the film on 29 November 2012, almost a decade after the deaths of both leads.

== Proposed follow-up ==
After filming ended, it was announced that Saltzman, Hecht and Thomas would make an adaptation of The Imaginary Invalid starring Robert Helpmann, but this film was never made.

== Mentions ==
Hope mentions this film in the I Love Lucy season 6 episode "Lucy and Bob Hope"; he asks a young fan if he has seen the movie, to which the boy replies, "Yes, sir!"

== Bibliography ==
- Berg, A. Scott. Kate Remembered: Katharine Hepburn, a Personal Biography. London: Pocket, 2004, First edition 2003. ISBN 0-7434-1563-9.
- Box, Betty E Lifting the Lid, 2001
- Chandler, Charlotte. I Know Where I'm Going: Katharine Hepburn, a Personal Biography. Milwaukee, Wisconsin: Applause, 2011 edition, First edition 2010. ISBN 1-907532-01-3.
- Faith, William Robert. Bob Hope: A Life in Comedy. New York: Da Capo Press, 2003. ISBN 978-0-30681-207-1.
- Higham, Charles. Kate: The Life of Katharine Hepburn. New York: W. W. Norton, 2004, First edition 1975. ISBN 978-0-39332-598-0.
- Leaming, Barbara. Katharine Hepburn. New York: Limelight Editions, 2004. ISBN 978-0-87910-293-7.
- Quirk, Lawrence J. Bob Hope: The Road Well-Traveled. New York: Applause, 1998. ISBN 978-1-55783-353-2.
- Sinden, Donald. A Touch of the Memoirs. London: Hodder & Stoughton, 1982. ISBN 978-0-3402-6235-1.
