= Doctor at Sea =

Doctor at Sea may refer to:

- Doctor at Sea (novel), 1953 novel by Richard Gordon
- Doctor at Sea (film), 1955 British comedy film
- Doctor at Sea (TV series), 1974 British TV series
