= Doctor at Sea (novel) =

1953 novel by Richard Gordon

- First edition
- Author: Richard Gordon
- Language: English
- Series: Doctor series
- Genre: Comedy
- Publisher: Michael Joseph
- Publication date: 1953
- Publication place: United Kingdom
- Media type: Print
- Preceded by: Doctor in the House
- Followed by: Doctor at Large

Doctor at Sea is a 1953 comedy novel by the British writer Richard Gordon. It is the second entry in the Doctor series of books, the sequel to Doctor in the House. The book is fictional, however, Richard Gordon, the author, was a ship's surgeon and anaesthetist resulting in a strong sense of realism being conveyed throughout. The introductory pages set the comedic tone for the remainder of the novel.

== Plot ==
A young, inexperienced medical man signs up as a ship's doctor for a voyage from Liverpool to Rio de Janeiro and enjoys a series of unlikely adventures.

== Major Themes ==
Central to this novel and themes of maritime adventure, mishaps, comedy, and emergency medicine. The ship's crew are diverse and there are various personality clashes which tend to become inflamed with rapidity, partly, because all on board are bordering on, or are alcoholic. On board the primary prescription is 'medical comforts' that is any liquor within arm's reach. The 'medical comforts' are imbued by both the patient and the doctor alike, for pain and then for the Dr's confidence. Confidence being a necessity given that most of the surgical equipment has been borrowed by light fingers to be sold or traded.

Richard Gordan is a master of making the scenes come to life, by using concise descriptions and the regular inclusion of dialogue.

== Reception ==
The review in the inner leaf, reads "Hilarious sequel to that medical mirthquake Dr in the House I haven't laughed so much for a long time. If you're feeling down in the dumps this is just the tonic you need." Normal Walker (Daily Sketch).

The books sold well with at least twenty impressions and then later paper back editions in 2001 and 2008.

== Adaptation ==
In 1955 it was adapted into a film of the same title directed by Ralph Thomas and starring Dirk Bogarde, Brigitte Bardot and James Robertson Justice.

== Bibliography ==
- Goble, Alan. The Complete Index to Literary Sources in Film. Walter de Gruyter, 1999.
- Pringle, David. Imaginary People: A Who's who of Fictional Characters from the Eighteenth Century to the Present Day. Scolar Press, 1996.
