= The Wind Cannot Read =

1958 British film by Ralph Thomas

- Original British quad poster
- Directed by: Ralph Thomas
- Written by: Richard Mason; David Lean (uncredited)
- Based on: novel by Richard Mason
- Produced by: Betty E. Box; Earl St. John
- Starring: Dirk Bogarde; Yoko Tani; Ronald Lewis; John Fraser
- Cinematography: Ernest Steward
- Edited by: Frederick Wilson
- Music by: Angelo Francesco Lavagnino
- Distributed by: J. Arthur Rank Film Distributors
- Release date: 1958
- Running time: 115 minutes
- Country: United Kingdom
- Language: English

The Wind Cannot Read is a 1958 British drama film directed by Ralph Thomas and starring Dirk Bogarde, Yoko Tani, Ronald Lewis and John Fraser. It was based on the 1946 novel by Richard Mason, who also wrote the screenplay.

Ralph Thomas called it "a love story, a simple modern Romeo and Juliet style story."

== Plot ==
The film takes place in Burma and India during World War II.

A British officer falls in love with his Japanese instructor at a military language school. They start a romance, but she is regarded as the enemy and is not accepted by his countrymen. They marry in secret and plan on spending his two weeks' leave together. When one of the other officers is injured, he is sent into the field as an interrogator. Later he is captured by the Japanese army when he is patrolling with a brigadier and an Indian driver in a Japanese-controlled zone. He escapes and returns to his own lines, only to discover that his wife is suffering from a brain tumour. Although the doctor initially gives her good odds of surviving, she dies after an operation.

== Cast ==
- Dirk Bogarde as Flight Lieutenant Michael Quinn
- Yoko Tani as Aiko Suzuki ('Sabbi')
- Ronald Lewis as Fenwick
- John Fraser as Peter Munroe
- Anthony Bushell as Brigadier
- Heihachirō Ōkawa as Lieutenant Nakamura (Japanese: 中村 陸軍中尉, Nakamura Rikugun-Chūi)
- Marne Maitland as Bahadur
- Michael Medwin as Officer Lamb
- Richard Leech as Hobson
- Tony Wager as Moss
- Tadashi Ikeda as Itsumi-san
- Yôichi Matsue as Corporal Mori (Japanese: 毛利 伍長, Mōri Gochō)
- Donald Pleasence as doctor
- Joy Michael as first nurse
- Avice Landone as second nurse
- Jasdev Singh Soin as Indian soldier

== Title ==
The film's title derives from a Japanese poem, quoted in Basil Chamberlain's 1907 book A Handbook of Colloquial Japanese as:

kono hana wa / kataku oru-na! / to iu tate fuda mo / yomenu kaze ni wa / zehi mo nashi

The poem appears in the title sequence of the film translated as:

Though on a sign it is written: "Don't pluck these blossoms" – it is useless against the wind, which cannot read.

It is also printed in the front matter of the original novel, and is on the tombstone of Mason, who died in 1997.

== Development ==
The novel was published in 1947. According to Diana Morgan, Ealing Studios bought the film rights on the basis of the enthusiasm of director Robert Hamer, but then head of production Michael Balcon "then changed his mind, because of the sexual implications I think of the story."

=== David Lean ===
In 1955 David Lean became enthusiastic about the novel and secured the film rights through Alexander Korda, for whom the director had just made The Sound Barrier and Summertime. Lean wrote a script in collaboration with Mason travelling extensively through India and Hong Kong. In July 1955 it was announced Lean had cast Keiko Kishi as the girl. She was flown to London to practice her English.

Lean offered the male lead role to Kenneth More, who was under contract to Korda. More called it "the best script I have ever been offered" but was unsure about whether the public would accept him in the part after his success in Genevieve and Doctor in the House and turned it down. It was a decision More later regarded as "the greatest mistake I ever made professionally". At some point Lean reportedly considered making the lead character a Canadian and offered the part to Glenn Ford.

According to memos, Korda and Lean clashed over the script and Korda withdrew from the project in November 1955. Korda died on 23 January 1956 and the film rights to Mason's novel were sold to Rank Film Productions. Rank were making an increasing number of films overseas at the time on "authentic locations", others including Nor the Moon by Night.

On 1 February 1956 Lean met with Sam Spiegel, regarding a film version of Pierre Boulle's novel The Bridge on the River Kwai. On 4 February Lean received a letter from George Archibald of Rank turning down The Wind Cannot Read. Reportedly the reason for this decision was John Davis, head of Rank, was worried about Lean having full editorial control over the film. Lean decided to make Kwai and Kishi Keiko left London to return to Japan.

=== Ralph Thomas ===
Rank eventually assigned the project to the team of Betty Box and Ralph Thomas, who had made a number of successful films for the studio. Their association was announced in January 1957 just before Box and Thomas were about to start filming Campbell's Kingdom with Dirk Bogarde. (After that movie they would make A Tale of Two Cities, also with Bogarde, before filming The Wind Cannot Read.) Thomas knew Lean and recalled:

He gave the script to Betty and me to read. We were about to go off to shoot Campbell's Kingdom on location [in Cortina], and Betty rang John Davis from London Airport; she told him what The Wind Cannot Read was about and the numbers involved. He very bravely told her that, unless he cabled her in Cortina to the contrary, we could make the picture in India. I think he agreed to it because he trusted David Lean's judgement that it was a splendid book.

Thomas later told Lean's biographer, "David told me it was a great love story. I told him I didn't think it was. I thought it was a magazine story. I didn't fiddle with his script - there were no material changes." However Lean would not be credited on the final credits for the film.

John Fraser was borrowed from Associated British to play a support role. Ronald Lewis was under contract to Rank.

== Production ==
Filming started on 16 December 1957 at Pinewood Studios. The unit then shifted to India in January for over a month of location work. Many of the locations in India had been scouted by David Lean.

Bogarde said during filming "It's the first time I've been able to play a script without having to rewrite chunks. It is a magnificent piece of writing. Superb." During filming, John Davis of Rank pressured Box and Thomas to film an alternate, happier ending. Dirk Bogarde was upset by this and wrote an angry letter to Davis.

In January 1958 Rank announced it would be stopping four films and sacking over 300 workers in an economy measure due to an overall fall in cinema attendances. The four films in production at the studio at the time were A Night to Remember, Nor the Moon by Night, The Wind Cannot Read and Innocent Sinners which cost £1.1 million in total. Thomas announced at the time, "I am determined we are going to make this a very fine film. I have never wanted anything to be so perfect so much."

Ralph Thomas recalled years later, "It was a real three-handkerchief picture, which I thoroughly enjoyed making, and Dirk was very good in it."

== Reception ==
=== Box office ===
Kinematograph Weekly listed the film as being "in the money" at the British box office in 1958. Another account put the movie as one of the twelve most popular at the British box office in 1958.

It was one of the most popular British films of 1958 in Ireland.

=== Critical reception ===
Josh Billings of Kinematograph Weekly wrote "I found The Wind Cannot Read... a most moving war weepie and consider it a first-class popular and woman's picture. Not all the long-haired boys and girls agree with me, but, judging by the film's receipts at the Leicester Square Theatre over the week-end, the crowd is certainly on my side."

Variety called the film "compelling... it is overlong and the first half is a shade leisurely, but it has been written, directed and acted with polish and sincerity and the superb Asiatic locale helps a great deal."

The Monthly Film Bulletin wrote: "This adaptation of Richard Mason's novel is what the trade describes as a 'woman's picture', in this case complete with exotic music and a cloying theme song. Its central love story is alternately coy, sentimental and pathetic, and the emotions of the audience are touched in such a way as to arouse sympathy, without becoming too painful for comfort. The war episodes, involving Japanese brutalities, are presumably intended for those in need of sterner stuff; at any rate, they fit rather uneasily into the monotonous, gentle pattern of the rest. Visually, the film benefits from its Indian locations: crowded bazaars, city streets and picturesque views of the Taj Mahal provide genuine, if predictable, local colour. Yoko Tani has a distinctive charm and plays with some feeling; Dirk Bogarde, though, seems over-reserved and uncomfortable, especially when confronted with pseudo-poetic dialogue."

Filmink argued the film "is very good, but the fact that Rank could not deal with Lean was harmful in the long run – the biggest studio in Britain should have been able to work with the best directors."

== Accolades ==
Songwriter Peter Hart received the 1958 Ivor Novello award for Best Song Musically and Lyrically for the title song, performed by Vera Lynn.

== Notes ==
- Brownlow, Kevin (1997). David Lean : a biography.
- Harper, Sue; Porter, Vincent (2003). British cinema of the 1950s : the decline of deference.
