= Doctor in Trouble =

1970 British film by Ralph Thomas

- Original British 1970 quad film poster
- Directed by: Ralph Thomas
- Written by: Jack Davies
- Based on: Doctor on Toast by Richard Gordon
- Produced by: Betty Box
- Starring: Harry Secombe; Leslie Phillips; Robert Morley; Angela Scoular
- Cinematography: Ernest Steward
- Edited by: Peter Boita
- Music by: Eric Rogers
- Production company: Rank Organisation
- Distributed by: Rank Film Distributors
- Release date: 16 June 1970 (UK)
- Running time: 90 minutes
- Country: United Kingdom
- Language: English
- Budget: £300,000

Doctor in Trouble is a 1970 British comedy film, the seventh and last film in the Doctor series. The film was directed by Ralph Thomas and stars Leslie Phillips as a doctor who gets accidentally trapped on an outgoing cruise ship while it begins a round the world trip. The cast was rounded out by a number of British comedy actors including James Robertson Justice, Harry Secombe and Angela Scoular. The film was based on the 1961 novel Doctor on Toast by Richard Gordon, and is unrelated to the 1964 novel bearing the same title written by Clare Cavendish.

== Plot ==
Renowned surgeon Sir Lancelot Spratt arranges a cruise for his patient, the famous television star Basil Beauchamp. The captain of the ship is Lancelot Spratt's brother George Spratt.

Doctor Burke becomes a stowaway by mistake when chasing his girlfriend Ophelia onto the ship to propose to her. She is one of a group of models doing a fashion shoot with camp photographer Roddy. Other passengers aboard ship include pools winner Llewellyn Wendover and Mrs. Dailey, a socially ambitious lady hoping to find a wealthy match for her daughter Dawn.

Burke is pursued by the Master-at-Arms who correctly suspects that he does not have a ticket. Burke tries various ruses to try to escape him, including dressing up as a doctor. Eventually he is caught and exposed as a stowaway. Captain Spratt orders him to serve as an orderly, scrubbing the ship.

When the ship's doctor falls ill from a tropical disease, Burke takes over his duties. He is called into action when a Soviet cargo ship sends a request for help due to a patient with acute appendicitis. Burke is transferred to that ship to perform an operation. By the time he has finished his own ship has departed, and he is forced to stay on board the Soviet vessel until it reaches Grimsby. When the cruise ship finally returns to port, Burke learns his girlfriend has married the ship's doctor, now recovered from his illness.

Meanwhile, Dawn Dailey, having failed to snare Captain Spratt, decides to marry Wendover. She learns after the wedding that he is not as wealthy as she had imagined.

== Cast ==
- Leslie Phillips as Dr. Tony Burke
- Harry Secombe as Llewellyn Wendover
- Robert Morley as Captain George Spratt
- James Robertson Justice as Sir Lancelot Spratt
- Simon Dee as Basil Beauchamp
- Angela Scoular as Ophelia O'Brien
- Irene Handl as Mrs. Dailey
- Janet Mahoney as Dawn Dailey
- Freddie Jones as Master-at-Arms
- Joan Sims as Russian Captain
- John Le Mesurier as Purser
- Graham Stark as Saterjee
- Graham Chapman as Roddy
- Jacki Piper as girl in taxi
- Fred Emney as father
- Yuri Borienko as sick Russian
- Gerald Sim as 1st doctor
- Yutte Stensgaard as Eve (model)
- Jimmy Thompson as ship's doctor
- Sylvana Henriques as model
- Marcia Fox as Jean
- Tom Kempinski as Stedman Green
- Anthony Sharp as Chief Surgeon
- Marianne Stone as spinster
- John Bluthal as TV doctor
- Geoffrey Davies as Doctor (uncredited)
- Norman Chappell as Waiter (uncredited)
- Joan Benham as lady in green dress (uncredited)

== Production ==
=== Development ===
The film was based on the book Doctor on Toast, published in 1961. The plot of the book focused on Dr Grymsdyke and was different from the final film.

In March 1966 Rank announced it would make nine films with a total cost of £7.5 million of which it would provide £4 million. Two films were financed by Rank completely, a Norman Wisdom movie and a "doctor" comedy (Doctor on Toast which became Doctor in Trouble). The others were The Quiller Memorandum, Deadlier than the Male, Maroc 7, Red Hot Ferrari (never made), The Fifth Coin (never made), Battle of Britain and The Long Duel.

The original intention was for James Robertson Justice to play two roles, Sir Lancelot Spratt and his twin-brother Captain George Spratt (a variation of the part of Captain Hogg that he had played in Doctor at Sea) – "the best part of any we'd done together" according to producer Betty Box.

However, shortly before filming, Justice had a cerebral stroke and was rushed from his home near Inverness to Aberdeen for brain surgery. Justice recovered and wanted to play both roles as planned but the filmmakers decided he would be unable to do so, in part because he now had an uncontrollable tremor in his right arm. The part of Captain Spratt was offered to Robert Morley (who had been considered for the role of Lancelot Spratt in Doctor in the House but had wanted too much money). James Robertson Justice still played the smaller role of Lancelot. "It must have taken every ounce of energy he possessed to do it", said Box. "We knew he needed the money and paid him for both parts – he certainly deserved it for long and loyal service."

=== Shooting ===
Producer Betty Box said the film "wasn't a happy time for" her and director Ralph Thomas as they knew it "was the last movie we'd be able to make" with Justice. She felt Robert Morley's casting undermined the picture. "Situations which would have been hilarious with James were just mildly amusing with Morley, and the whole point of the piece was lost", she said. Despite good performances from other members of the cast, she thought "the entire project was doomed... from the day a real life surgeon said the world 'Scalpel' over dear James's unconscious bulk."

It was Leslie Phillips' third appearance in a "Doctor" film. He played Dr Tony Burke, the same character he played in Doctor in Love. In Doctor in Clover, he played Dr Gaston Grimsdyke.

It was the first time Angela Scoular acted opposite Leslie Phillips; the two would later fall in love and marry.

The film was in production concurrently with the first series of the Doctor in the House television series, in which Yutte Stensgaard (Eve) had a recurring role and Graham Chapman (Roddie) was one of the writers.

Ralph Thomas did not like the film saying "the unit was getting desperate, of course, and the title says it all; but it still, fortunately, continued making money, but I couldn't bear to make any more films in the series. And so Rank said "Well, right. Would you allow us to dispose of your interest in a television series. And I said "yes I've love to" and so they did."

Box thought the Doctor series "died" when James Robertson Justice did.

== Reception ==
The Monthly Film Bulletin wrote: "By far the unfunniest of the Doctor series – plotless, witless, and reaching the peak of its invention with the joke about the passenger who puts his clothes through a porthole under the impression that it is a washing-machine. Leslie Phillips is in due (and relentless) course called upon to lose his trousers, do a female impersonation and fall down a ventilator, but the film has expired from a surfeit of corn and Simon Dee long before that."

Penelope Mortimer of The Observer wrote "why all this talent, of various kinds, gets absolutely nowhere must be the fault of the screenplay... For it is a dreadful story, a terrible script, inadequately seasoned with worn out laughs. In all fairness I must say that a large section of the audience was hooting with laughter. It is on occasionals like this that one feels one has dropped from Mars."

Filmink called it "tired and sad - but the franchise proved it still had life in it by transferring over to television, where it ran for several years. If Rank wanted more “doctor” movies and Thomas and Box were getting sick of them – which is totally understandable – the organisation should have gotten other filmmakers to try their luck.".

The film receives two stars out of five in the Radio Times Guide to Films, which describes it as "innocently smutty" and feeling like it has been made up of "leftovers from Doctor at Sea".

== Notes ==
- Box, Betty (2000). Lifting the Lid: The Autobiography of Film Producer, Betty Box. Book Guild Publishing Ltd.
