= Upstairs and Downstairs =

1959 British film by Ralph Thomas

- Directed by: Ralph Thomas
- Written by: Frank Harvey
- Based on: novel by Ronald Scott Thorn
- Produced by: Betty E. Box
- Starring: Michael Craig; Anne Heywood; Mylène Demongeot; Claudia Cardinale
- Cinematography: Ernest Steward
- Edited by: Alfred Roome
- Music by: Philip Green
- Production company: Ralph Thomas-Betty E Box Productions
- Distributed by: The Rank Organisation
- Release date: 27 August 1959
- Running time: 101 minutes
- Country: United Kingdom
- Language: English

Upstairs and Downstairs is a 1959 British comedy film directed by Ralph Thomas and starring Michael Craig, Anne Heywood, Mylène Demongeot, Claudia Cardinale, James Robertson Justice, Joan Sims, Joan Hickson and Sid James. It features the first English-language performance of Claudia Cardinale.

== Plot ==
Richard Barry marries Kate, the daughter of his boss, Mr Mansfield. Mansfield tells Richard that he needs to take over the entertaining for their firm. Richard decides this will require hiring some domestic help at home, but there then follows a series of very unsuitable servants. Eventually, he hires a young Swedish blonde woman, Ingrid, who is most competent and liked, not only by Richard and Kate and their two children, but also by their male friends. But Ingrid likes Richard...

== Cast ==
- Michael Craig as Richard Barry
- Anne Heywood as Kate Barry
- Mylène Demongeot as Ingrid
- James Robertson Justice as Mansfield
- Claudia Cardinale as Maria
- Sid James as P.C. Edwards
- Joan Hickson as Rosemary
- Joan Sims as Blodwen
- Joseph Tomelty as Arthur Farringdon
- Nora Nicholson as Edith Farringdon
- Daniel Massey as Wesley Cotes
- Austin Willis as McGuffey
- Margalo Gillmore as Mrs McGuffey
- Reginald Beckwith as arson
- Cyril Chamberlain as guard
- Dilys Laye as agency girl
- Irene Handl as large woman
- William Mervyn as Kingsley
- Eric Pohlmann as Mario
- Jean Cadell as 1st old lady
- Barbara Everest as 2nd old lady
- Stephen Gregson as Paul
- Nicholas Phipps as Harry
- Jeremy Burnham as Frank
- Nicholas Parsons as Brian
- Madge Ryan as policewoman
- Betty Henderson as Bridget
- Barbara Steele as Mary
- Susan Hampshire as minor role
- Oliver Reed as minor role
- Shirley Anne Field as minor role
- Sam Kydd as driver

== Production ==
It was based on a 1957 novel by Ronald Scott Thorn, the pen name of Dr Ronald Wilkinson. Filming began in March 1959.

Ralph Thomas and Betty Box made the film after a series of more expensive adventure films. "I'm glad we're back in comedy", said Box. "I like to make people laugh. I think they get enough crying in daily life. Also the results in comedy are more tangible. You hear where you succeed."

Ralph Thomas later called the film "a light comedy which I liked very much... I had a great cast in that one... For its period it was a very effective, very small little comedy, which I think was really very funny."

Michael Craig said "the jokes and the situations were pretty much the same as in all the other Box/Thomas comedies. That's not surprising as they were mostly written by the same person and had the same casts." His female co star was Anne Heywood who was then one of the busiest actors at Rank.

Nicholas Parsons, who had a small role called it "a delightful domestic romp" where Demongeot "was incredibly sexy, and everyone fancied her like crazy."

Sid James' eighteen month old daughter Susan appears in the film. James' biographer called the film a "glossy but empty-headed comedy... strangely out of touch for the late fifties." The ending of the film involves James' character announcing he has married a female colleague. Ralph Thomas said, "There is no way I could allow Sid to walk down the aisle. The public would never believe it and besides that battered face just doesn’t go with a romantic role."

== Release ==
Upstairs and Downstairs was one of seven Rank films bought for release in the US by 20th Century Fox.

== Box office ==
In October 1959 Kinematograph Weekly reported the film "managed to end well on the right [of the box office] quite an achievement considering that was in the wake of I'm All Right, Jack and Carry On Teacher. Its feminine angle apparently did the trick."

In December 1959 Kinematograph Weekly claimed the film "did well" at the box office although it did not list it among the movies that performed "better than average" for the year.

== Critical reception ==
The Monthly Film Bulletin wrote: "This would-be souffié emerges as a depressingly heavy pudding. The fault lies principally in a jaded screenplay, based on a novel which can seemingly never have been suitable screen material. A host of familiar character actors go through their usual party pieces, but only Myléne Demongeot and Daniel Massey bring a spark of vivacity to the proceedings, and that in the last half hour. Miss Demongeot in particular, though an unlikely Swede, conjures a performance of mischievous charm out of the thinnest possible material."

Variety called it "simple, rather uneven, yet amiable."

Leslie Halliwell said: "Glossy, cheerful, empty-headed domestic comedy."

Filmink wrote "It was made with the typical Rank combination of contract stars (Michael Craig, Anne Heywood) and support players (James Robertson Justice, Sid James) plus imported European actresses (Claudia Cardinale, Mylene Demongeot). It’s cheery, amiable, glossy, self-satisfied, nicely shot, and dim."

The Radio Times Guide to Films gave the film 3/5 stars, writing: "It must have been very frustrating for the cast of accomplished British performers, let alone for stars Claudia Cardinale and Mylène Demonget, to have watched all their efforts being frittered away by such dull leads as Michael Craig and Anne Heywood. As the newlyweds searching for the perfect servant, they are the weak link in every scene. But you can still enjoy seeing Cardinale as a man-mad maid, Joan Hickson as a secret tippler, Joan Sims as a timid Welsh nanny, Sid James as a put upon bobby and Demonget as a Pollyanna-like au pair."

In British Sound Films: The Studio Years 1928–1959 David Quinlan rated the film as "mediocre", writing: "Fairly dire comedy almost saved by Demongeot's sparkle in the last half-hour."
