= A Pair of Briefs =

1962 British film by Ralph Thomas

- Theatrical poster by Renato Fratini
- Directed by: Ralph Thomas
- Written by: Kay Bannerman (play); Harold Brooke (play); Nicholas Phipps (screenplay)
- Produced by: Betty E. Box; Earl St. John
- Starring: Michael Craig; Mary Peach; Brenda De Banzie; James Robertson Justice
- Cinematography: Ernest Steward
- Edited by: Alfred Roome
- Music by: Norrie Paramor
- Distributed by: J. Arthur Rank Film Distributors
- Release date: March 1962
- Running time: 90 minutes
- Country: United Kingdom
- Language: English

A Pair of Briefs is a 1962 black and white British courtroom comedy film directed by Ralph Thomas and starring Michael Craig, Mary Peach, Brenda De Banzie and James Robertson Justice. The screenplay was written by Nicholas Phipps based on the 1960 play How Say You? by Harold Brooke and Kay Bannerman.

A newly qualified female barrister clashes with a male colleague when they represent opposite sides in a matrimonial dispute.

The title is a double entendre, referring both to the documents setting out the case a barrister argues in court, and also to an item of underwear. The film title and opening credits are shown over a scene of the female barrister in her underwear as she dresses for the office, and the publicity poster illustrates this. The "Brief" of the title refers to the document which a solicitor in the UK court system writes to instruct a barrister who will present their client's case in court. The term can also be applied to the person presenting the brief. The intended double meaning is that a "pair of briefs" also is the usual term for a pair of female underpants.

== Plot ==
Tony Stevens, as a junior barrister, bemoans the fact that he receives nothing but routine briefs concerning sewers, with small fees. So when a high-paying brief concerning a writ for "restitution of conjugal rights" is given to newly arrived Frances Pilbright (who just happens to be the niece of a senior barrister in the chambers Sir John Pilbright, and god-daughter of the instructing solicitor), Stevens is outraged, and, by devious means, obtains the brief for the opposite side in the case.

Stevens' case, sitting alongside Sir John, relates to a house of ill-repute run by a Gale Tornado who employs various exotic dancers. Stevens distracts various parties as he is trying to disguise marmalade on his collar.

Meanwhile, Pilbright works fiercely for her client, a woman whose marriage was disrupted by World War II, with the registration office and its record of the marriage destroyed in the blitz on the day she wed. The woman further claims that another bombing raid caused her to lose her memory and she moved to another part of the country, and has only recently recovered her memory and the knowledge that she was married.

Stevens gets his room-mate Hubert to pass him the opposing brief and therefore advocates for the other side, Sid Pudney, the man whom she claims is her husband but who denies that they were ever married. The two barristers squabble in their offices and in court.

Pilbright, about to lose the case, makes a furious declaration in which she declares "the Law is an Ass!". Stevens, seeing how upset she is, joins her in this, but in their zeal, they offend the presiding judge, Mr Justice Haddon, who tells them that he intends to have them severely disciplined.

Outside the court, Stevens overhears an exchange between the two parties and sees Sid burn their wedding certificate. The couple split, and both seem abnormally happy. Stevens follows the woman to a posh hotel and confronts her. It is revealed that the couple really were married, but in the intervening years the woman had bigamously married another man who has become very wealthy, and she brought the case with the intention that it should fail and "prove" that she had not married previously, so as to prevent her being charged with bigamy and to remove any possibility that her previous husband could make a claim against her newfound wealth.

The two barristers are both annoyed to know that both their clients deceived them, but they realise that they are in love.

== Cast ==
- Michael Craig as Tony Stevens
- Mary Peach as Frances Pilbright
- Brenda De Banzie as Gladys Worthing (Pudney)
- James Robertson Justice as Mr. Justice Haddon
- Roland Culver as Sir John Pilbright
- Liz Fraser as Pearl Hoskins
- Ron Moody as Sidney (Sid) Pudney
- Jameson Clark as George Lockwood
- Charles Heslop as Peebles
- Bill Kerr as Victor, club owner
- Nicholas Phipps as Sutcliffe
- Joan Sims as Gale Tornado
- John Standing as Hubert Shannon
- Amanda Barrie as exotic dancer (snake)
- Judy Carne as exotic dancer (maid)
- Barbara Ferris as Gloria Lockwood
- Myrtle Reed as barmaid
- Terry Scott as policeman at law courts
- Graham Stark as police witness
- Ronnie Stevens as hotel under-manager
- Michael Ward as Judge Haddon's assistant (uncredited)
- Geoffrey Denton as the court usher (uncredited)

== Production ==
It was Michael Craig's fifth film for Box and Thomas and the last movie he did under his contract with Rank. He called it "a dismal comedy" in which he and Mary Peach "did our best but the material was pretty thin and in spite of some extraordinary overacting by Ron Moody... and Brenda de Banzie, there weren't many laughs."

== Critical reception ==
The Monthly Film Bulletin wrote: "The film pokes some broad and clumsy fun at the expense of the legal profession along highly stagy lines; the set piece of the court scene takes up a third of the film, and is laboured in the extreme. Ralph Thomas's heavy-handed touch is most evident in his direction of Mary Peach and Michel Craig, stiff and uninteresting as the two legal innocents at court."

The Radio Times Guide to Films gave the film 2/5 stars, writing: "This tepid comedy falls flat for the simple reason that feuding barristers Michael Craig and Mary Peach just don't click. Not only is the romantic banter very poor, but there is also none of the knowing courtroom comedy that made the Boulting brothers' Brothers in Law so enjoyable. James Robertson-Justice contributes some bullish support, but this just isn't funny enough."

Filmink called it "a sort of British Adam's Rib."
