= Doctor in Distress (film) =

1963 British film by Ralph Thomas

- Original British 1963 quad film poster
- Directed by: Ralph Thomas
- Screenplay by: Nicholas Phipps; Ronald Scott Thorn
- Produced by: Betty E. Box
- Starring: Dirk Bogarde; James Robertson Justice; Samantha Eggar
- Cinematography: Ernest Steward
- Edited by: Alfred Roome
- Music by: Norrie Paramor
- Production company: Rank Organisation
- Distributed by: Rank Film Distributors
- Release date: 20 July 1963 (UK)
- Running time: 102 minutes
- Country: United Kingdom
- Language: English

Doctor in Distress is a 1963 British comedy film directed by Ralph Thomas and starring Dirk Bogarde, James Robertson Justice, and Samantha Eggar. It is the fifth of the seven films in the Doctor series. After a one-film absence, it was the final return to the role of Simon Sparrow by Dirk Bogarde, and also the return (although in a different role) of Donald Houston. The film uses some of the characters in Richard Gordon's Doctor novels, but is not based on any of them.

== Plot ==
Simon Sparrow, now a senior doctor at Hampden Cross Hospital, falls in love with Delia, a model and aspiring actress. They eventually move in together, but then she goes to Italy to audition for a film.

Meanwhile, Sir Lancelot Spratt injures his back in a fall. Placed under the care of physiotherapist Iris Marchant, he is initially hostile, but soon succumbs to her charms. He turns to his friend Simon for advice. Simon sends him to a nature cure clinic in a vain attempt to help him lose weight. Spratt has Iris followed, and, when his private investigator turns up at Hampden Cross as a patient, follows her himself (terrorising a nervous train passenger in the process). He proposes to her, but is eventually rejected in favour of another of her patients, retired army Major Tommy French.

Delia returns to England, having somehow acquired an expensive Italian car and expensive clothes, though she did not win a part in the film. It is implied that she and Simon get together again.

== Cast ==
- Dirk Bogarde as Dr Simon Sparrow
- Samantha Eggar as Delia Mallory
- James Robertson Justice as Sir Lancelot Spratt
- Donald Houston as Major Tommy French
- Barbara Murray as Iris Marchant
- Dennis Price as Dr Blacker
- Mylène Demongeot ('guest star') as Sonia and Helga
- Jill Adams as Genevieve Milton
- Timothy Bateson as Mr Holly
- Jessie Evans as Mrs Parry
- Fenella Fielding as train passenger
- Frank Finlay as corsetière
- Michael Flanders as Bradby
- Derek Fowlds as Gillibrand
- Pauline Jameson as ward sister
- Bill Kerr as Australian sailor
- Ann Lynn as Mrs Whittaker
- Joe Robinson as Sonia's boyfriend
- Madge Ryan as Mrs Clapper
- David Weston as Dr Stewart
- Paul Whitsun-Jones as Grimes
- Ronnie Barker as man at railway station (uncredited)
- Amanda Barrie as Miss Steel (uncredited)
- Reginald Beckwith as Meyer (uncredited)
- Christopher Beeny as medical student (uncredited)
- John Bluthal as station porter (uncredited)
- Margaret Boyd as Lady Willoughby (uncredited)
- Richard Briers as medical student (uncredited)
- Johnny Briggs as medical student (uncredited)
- Victor Brooks as policeman (uncredited)
- Peter Butterworth as ambulance man (uncredited)
- Rodney Cardiff as student doctor (uncredited)
- Denise Coffey as station refreshments lady (uncredited)
- Felix Felton as health farm patient (uncredited)
- Hilda Fenemore as station café proprietor (uncredited)
- Michael Goldie as PT instructor (uncredited)
- Barbara Hicks as health farm receptionist (uncredited)
- Ronald Lacey as 2nd man in Mum's Diner (uncredited)
- Harry Landis as 1st man in Mum's Diner (uncredited)
- Jeanette Landis as Rosie (uncredited)
- Jill Mai Meredith as health farm nurse (uncredited)
- Leo McKern as Harry Heilbron (uncredited)
- Renu Setna as medical student (uncredited)
- Ronnie Stevens as hotel manager (uncredited)
- Marianne Stone as Mum's Diner waitress (uncredited)
- Toke Townley as clerk of works (uncredited)

== Production ==
Dirk Bogarde had not appeared in the previous "doctor" movie Doctor in Love but agreed to return to the series for this one. "Dirk will not be the unsure doctor that he used to be," said producer Betty Box. "He will be grown up, more mature, more sophisticated. But there will be girls in the story and he will become involved with them, of course."

Bogarde made the movie in April 1963 immediately after finishing The Servant. It was one of the first films for Samantha Eggar, who had just made The Wild and the Willing for Thomas and Box.

== Reception ==
The film was one of the ten most popular movies at the British box office in 1963.

According to Kine Weekly the four most popular films at the British box office in 1963 were From Russia With Love, Summer Holiday, Tom Jones and The Great Escape, followed by, in alphabetical order, Doctor in Distress, The Fast Lady, Girls! Girls! Girls!, Heavens Above!, Jason and the Argonauts, In Search of the Castaways, It Happened at the World's Fair, The Longest Day, On the Beat, Sodom and Gomorrah, The V. I. Ps, and The Wrong Arm of the Law.

Filmink' wrote "Bogarde was getting too old to play someone luckless in love (Samantha Eggar was his co-star, although the film belongs to James Robertson Justice as much as Bogarde). The movie has some funny bits, but it lacks the soul of previous films – no one really grows or makes friends, or forms a relationship, like the earlier ones in the series."
