= Doctor in the House (novel) =

Novel by Richard Gordon

- First edition
- Author: Richard Gordon
- Language: English
- Series: Doctor series
- Publisher: Michael Joseph
- Publication date: 1952
- Media type: Print (hardback & paperback)
- Pages: 190
- Preceded by: -
- Followed by: Doctor at Sea

Doctor in the House is a comic novel by Richard Gordon, published in 1952. Set in the fictitious St. Swithin's Hospital in London, the story concerns the exploits and various pranks of a young medical student. It is the first of a series of 'Doctor' novels written by Gordon, himself a surgeon and anaesthetist. The main character is also named Richard Gordon, although after the first few books he is renamed Simon Sparrow, the name also used in the screen and radio adaptations. (The television series used entirely different characters.)

A film adaptation, Doctor in the House, was released in 1954, starring Dirk Bogarde; several of the subsequent books were also filmed. There were a number of TV series very loosely based on the books, a 13-part radio series on the BBC in 1968 starring Richard Briers as Simon, and a 6-episode audio sitcom podcast in 2025.
