= Checkpoint (1956 film) =

- Directed by: Ralph Thomas
- Screenplay by: Robin Estridge
- Produced by: Betty E. Box
- Starring: Anthony Steel; Odile Versois; Stanley Baker; James Robertson Justice
- Cinematography: Ernest Steward
- Edited by: Frederick Wilson
- Music by: Bruce Montgomery
- Production company: Rank Organisation
- Distributed by: J. Arthur Rank Film Distributors
- Release dates: 25 December 1956 (London, England)
- Running time: 80 mins
- Country: England
- Language: English

Checkpoint is a 1956 British crime drama film directed by Ralph Thomas and starring Anthony Steel, Odile Versois, Stanley Baker and James Robertson Justice. It was written by Robin Estridge.

== Plot ==
O'Donovan breaks into a safe in a factory in Florence, Italy, late at night. That triggers a burglar alarm, and he shoots the night watchman and at least one policeman; his gunfire also starts a fire that consumes the factory. He goes to Francesca and demands she put him in contact with Petersen, her boss. Petersen hides O'Donovan at his villa.

In England, Warren Ingram tells Michael of his connection to the fiasco. Ingram, an industrial magnate, hired O'Donovan to lure away the designer for the Volta D'Italia car racing team, in hopes of making his team world champions. O'Donovan was unable to do that, so turned to industrial espionage, against Ingram's explicit orders not to do anything illegal, violent or risky. Ingram decides to smuggle O'Donovan out of the country, and Michael recommends driver Bill Fraser who needs money for a race car he has designed and is building.

The team board a flight to Italy, followed by Ingram and Michael. There, Fraser mends his strained romantic relationship with Francesca. Hiding at Petersen's villa, O'Donovan is displeased to hear that Ingram wants him to go to Bombay via Switzerland. O'Donovan tells Petersen to inform Ingram that he will sell the plans for the "fuel intake" Ingram wanted. At his team's garage, Ingram tells team manager Thornhill to team young driver Johnny Carpenter with his friend Fraser for the important upcoming race from Florence to Locarno. After sending Thornhill to the refueling stop at Milan, Ingram meets with O'Donovan and reluctantly buys the plans.

Between them, Petersen and his girlfriend Gabriela drug Johnny's drinks. Next day, Ingram calls Bill to Johnny's room, where Johnny is unconscious next to a whisky bottle. Since no last-minute driver changes are allowed, Ingram offers Bill financial backing for his race car in exchange for taking the risk of breaching the rules by substituting another co-driver for Johnny. Bill agrees.

On the day of the race, Francesca goes to Johnny's room to fetch him, but runs into O'Donovan and Petersen. Petersen holds Francesca captive while O'Donovan masquerades as Johnny. Ingram tells Francesca that if she notifies the authorities, Bill will go to prison. She is then released, though Ingram orders Petersen to follow her. She books a flight to Milan and breaks away from Petersen and gets aboard.

At the race-stop in Milan, Francesca warns Bill, but O'Donovan points his pistol at him, so Bill resumes the race. Francesca asks for Thornhill's help, and he drives her on a shortcut across the mountains to intercept Bill and O'Donovan without involving the police. Bill pulls over, complaining of a loose wheel or flat, and tries to overpower O'Donovan, but fails. O'Donovan orders Bill not to stop at the last checkpoint, even if they need to refuel to reach the finish line. Fearing for his life, Bill ignores O'Donovan's order to slow down, since O'Donovan cannot safely shoot him without endangering himself. Bill then deliberately takes a wrong turn, heading back from Switzerland towards Italy. Once O'Donovan realises what Bill is doing, he tries to grab the wheel. The car goes off the road and teeters on the edge of a cliff. The two men get out and fight, as Ingram, Francesca and the others converge on the scene. O'Donovan is knocked into the car, which then plunges over the cliff and into the lake. Ingram, struck by falling debris, makes a full confession to a frontier guard, taking full responsibility.

== Cast ==
- Anthony Steel as Bill Fraser
- Odile Versois as Francesca
- Stanley Baker as O'Donovan
- James Robertson Justice as Warren Ingram
- Maurice Denham as Ted Thornhill
- Michael Medwin as Ginger
- Paul Muller as Petersen
- Lee Patterson as Johnny Carpenter
- Anne Heywood as Gabriela
- Anthony Oliver as Michael
- Philip Gilbert as Eddie
- McDonald Hobley as Commentator
- Robert Rietty as Frontier Guard
- Andreas Malandrinos as Night Watchman
- Dino Galvani as Hotel Hall Porter

== Production ==
It was the first in a new ten picture deal between the Rank Organisation and the team of Betty Box and Ralph Thomas. Rank announced the film in February 1956 as part of a slate of 20 films costing over £3 million of which sixteen were to be in colour. It was one of several thrillers made by Rank that year.

Jeanne Crain was mentioned as a possibility for the female lead. The movie was the first of several Stanley Baker made for Rank.

The film was shot in April 1956 at Pinewood Studios in London with location work in Italy, including footage of the Mille Miglia, and scenes at Lake Como. It was Anne Heywood's first movie for the Rank Organisation.

The movie features the Lagonda DP115 sports-racing car as the fictional 'Warren Ingram' car driven by the principal actors. John Wyer and Roy Salvadori worked on the film as advisers. "Steel handled the car with surprising ease—and it isn't an easy thing to drive", said Wyer.

Anthony Steel married Anita Ekberg during the making of the film. It was one of the last movies he made for the Rank Organisation.

== Reception ==
=== Box office ===
Betty Box later wrote that the film "was for some reason or other an enormous success in Japan, and as the Japanese were crazy about the pale blue drivers' overalls, the fan letters we got from them weren't, as is usual, asking for autographs or photographs. They wanted to know where they could buy the overalls."

=== Critical ===
The Monthly Film Bulletin wrote: "Combining a somewhat eccentric view of the machinations of a business tycoon with the more conventional elements of a motor racing thriller, Checkpoint lacks the speed and assurance that might have made its situations plausible. The script leans heavily on some well-worn clichés of dialogue and characterisation, and the direction fails to work up much interest in the outcome of the drive. There are, though, some stirring shots of fast cars roaring through the Italian countryside."

Kine Weekly wrote: "Rip-Roaring Eastman Color melodrama. ... Its story, needless to say, far from flatters the English, but nevertheless makes rousing action fare. An attractive and competent cast sees that its pace is hot, and neat romantic touches and superb scenery subtly cushion its thrills. Capital popular booking."

Variety called it "exciting entertainment".

In The Radio Times Guide to Films David Parkinson gave the film 2/5 stars, writing: "Although they promise fast-paced action, fiction films about motor racing rarely get out of first gear. At least here there is the compensation of some nifty auto action to pep up an otherwise pedestrian tale of industrial espionage."

Leslie Halliwell wrote "Acceptable hokum, cleanly assembled, with motor race highlights."

In British Sound Films: The Studio Years 1928–1959 David Quinlan rated the film as "average", writing: "Phoney action film moves in fits and starts."
