= Toke Townley =

British actor (1912–1984)

- Townley as Sam Pearson in Emmerdale Farm
- Born: John Antony Townley; 6 November 1912; Great Dunmow, Essex, England
- Died: 27 September 1984 (aged 71); Leeds, England
- Occupation: Actor

John Antony "Toke" Townley (6 November 1912 – 27 September 1984) was an English actor.

== Biography ==
Townley was born on 6 November 1912 at Great Dunmow, Essex; his father was a vicar. His first name, "John", was changed to "Toke" shortly after his birth. After he left school he worked as a clerk in a factory, acting in his spare time. He did not become a professional actor until his early 30s, first appearing at Birmingham Repertory Theatre. He appeared in many BBC television programmes during the early pioneering days at Alexandra Palace.

Between 1951 and 1970, in the heyday of the British studios, Townley appeared in almost thirty films, including Lady Godiva Rides Again, Doctor at Sea, The Quatermass Xperiment, The Admirable Crichton, Carry On Admiral, Doctor in Distress and Scars of Dracula.

He went on to appear in many film and television roles over the years, including The Avengers. He was also an accomplished flautist and played the instrument on screen.

Many of his roles were country bumpkins, so it was an appropriate move when Townley joined Emmerdale Farm as Annie Sugden's father, Sam Pearson, complete with cloth cap and collarless shirt, when the serial began in 1972. Although Sam was said to have been born in the 1890s, Townley was actually only seven years older than Sheila Mercier, who played his daughter. He appeared in over 800 episodes of Emmerdale Farm. Loved and admired by the rest of the cast, Townley was said to be a private person, living alone at a Leeds hotel, near where the programme was filmed. He died of a heart attack whilst still in the soap so his character was killed off shortly afterwards.

== Partial filmography ==
=== Film ===
| Year | Title | Role | Notes |
|---|---|---|---|
| 1951 | Lady Godiva Rides Again | Lucille's husband | |
| 1952 | Treasure Hunt | William Burke | |
| 1952 | Time Gentlemen, Please! | Potman | |
| 1952 | Meet Me Tonight | Stage Manager - Red Peppers | |
| 1952 | My Wife's Lodger | Soldier | |
| 1953 | Cosh Boy | Mr. 'Smith' | uncredited |
| 1953 | Turn the Key Softly | Prison Warder | uncredited |
| 1953 | The Broken Horseshoe | Fred Barker, Hall Porter | |
| 1953 | Innocents in Paris | Airport Porter | uncredited |
| 1953 | Meet Mr Lucifer | Trumpet Player | |
| 1954 | The Million Pound Note | Revivalist | uncredited |
| 1954 | The Runaway Bus | Henry Waterman | |
| 1954 | Fast and Loose | Alfred | |
| 1954 | Bang! You're Dead | Jimmy Knuckle | |
| 1954 | The Men of Sherwood Forest | Father David | |
| 1955 | Doctor at Sea | Jenkins | |
| 1955 | John and Julie | Booking Clerk | |
| 1955 | The Quatermass Xperiment | The Chemist | uncredited |
| 1955 | The Blue Peter | Pub Barman | uncredited |
| 1956 | Now and Forever | Garage Hand | uncredited |
| 1956 | Three Men in a Boat | Meek Man (Maze) | |
| 1957 | Carry On Admiral | Steward | |
| 1957 | The Admirable Crichton | Lovegrove | |
| 1957 | Barnacle Bill | Timmins | |
| 1958 | Innocent Sinners | Bates | uncredited |
| 1958 | Law and Disorder | Sidney Rumpthorne | |
| 1958 | A Cry from the Streets | Mr. Daniels | |
| 1959 | Look Back in Anger | Spectacled Man | |
| 1959 | Libel | Associate | |
| 1960 | The World of Suzie Wong | Waiter | uncredited |
| 1961 | The Missing Note | Mr. Parker | |
| 1962 | H.M.S. Defiant | Silly Billy | |
| 1962 | The Fast Lady | Angry Motorist | |
| 1963 | Doctor in Distress | Clerk of Works | uncredited |
| 1963 | The Chalk Garden | Shop Clerk | |
| 1970 | Scars of Dracula | Elderly Waggoner | |

=== Television ===
| Year | Title | Role | Notes |
|---|---|---|---|
| 1955 | London Playhouse | Jimmy | Episode: "Adeline Girard" |
| 1956 | ITV Television Playhouse | Albert Ward | Episode: "The Man in the Dock" |
| 1958 | The Firm of Girdlestone | Gilray | 2 episodes |
| 1959 | Charlesworth | Algar | Episode: "The Drainpipe" |
| 1959 | Probation Officer | Mr. Sadler | 1 episode |
| 1959 | A Mask for Alexis | Paul Weeks | 4 episodes |
| 1959 | The Four Just Men | Seers | Episode: "National Treasure" |
| 1960 | ITV Sunday Night Drama | Stukely | Episode: "The Devil Makes Sunday" |
| 1960-1961 | Deadline Midnight | Leonard Topey / Nelson | 3 episodes |
| 1961 | The Avengers | Bernard Bourg | Episode: "One for the Mortuary" |
| 1961 | A Chance of Thunder | Frank White | 3 episodes |
| 1964 | The Avengers | Joseph Gourlay | Episode: "The White Elephant" |
| 1965 | Hereward the Wake | Priest | 2 episodes |
| 1967 | United! | Albert Black | 3 episodes |
| 1967 | The Rat Catchers | Shebenen | 2 episodes |
| 1967 | Market in Honey Lane | Alf Gershon | 4 episodes |
| 1968 | The Champions | Peanut Vendor | Episode: "To Trap a Rat" |
| 1969 | Out of the Unknown | Martin | Episode: "Target Generation" |
| 1969 | ITV Playhouse | Pierce | Episode: "You've Made Your Bed: Now Lie in It" |
| 1969 | The Wednesday Play | Mr. Phillips | Episode: "The Last Train Through Harecastle Tunnel" |
| 1969 | Department S | George Parsons | Episode: "The Shift That Never Was" |
| 1969 | Not in Front of the Children | First Removal Man | Episode: "Pastures New" |
| 1969 | Take Three Girls | Perkins | Episode: "Try Loving" |
| 1970 | For the Love of Ada | Man in Cemetery | Episode: "The Widower" |
| 1970 | Ben Travers' Farces | Luke Meate | Episode: "Turkey Time" |
| 1971 | The Flaxton Boys | Henry Selby | 3 episodes |
| 1971 | The Rivals of Sherlock Holmes | Lost Property Assistant | Episode: "The Case of Laker, Absconded" |
| 1972-1984 | Emmerdale Farm | Sam Pearson | 789 episodes |
