= Felix Felton =

British actor, director, composer and author (1911–1972)

Felix Felton as Sir Thomas Modyford in the BBC series Captain Morgan

Robert Forbes Felton (12 August 1911 – 21 October 1972), known professionally as Felix Felton, was a British film, television, stage and voice actor as well as a radio director, composer and author.

== Radio work ==
In his earlier years Felton considered becoming a professional pianist, a composer or a classical scholar, but instead chose to become an actor. At Oxford University where he studied Music he was President of the Oxford University Dramatic Society. He began his acting career as Bottom in Max Reinhardt's production of A Midsummer Night's Dream. He joined BBC Radio in 1934 where he was a producer, actor and director until 1948, producing Calling Germany in 1943 and directing a BBC Radio production of George Bernard Shaw's Candida in 1946, among others. In 1941 he was a Senior Instructor on the BBC's 'General Broadcasting Technique' course which included George Orwell as a student when he joined the BBC's Overseas Service. He resigned from his post at the BBC in 1948 in order to concentrate on a career as a freelance writer and actor.

In 1957 he adapted Rosemary Sutcliff's The Eagle of the Ninth in six episodes for BBC Children's Hour with himself playing the part of Guern the hunter. In 1961 he also adapted Rosemary Sutcliff's The Lantern Bearers into a six-part series for Children's Hour for BBC Radio; In 1962 he adapted her book Dawn Wind for radio and himself played the role of Einon Hen. Felton adapted The Hound of the Baskervilles into Baskervilles Hund which was broadcast on Danish radio in January 1964. In 1965, together with Susan Ashman, he adapted Quo Vadis by Henryk Sienkiewicz as a ten part serial for the BBC Home Service. In this major radio drama production he played the prominent role of Gaius Petronius Arbiter the adviser and confidant of the Roman Emperor Nero.

== Acting career ==
=== Theatre ===
Felton's stage appearances included the speaking-role of Merlin in a concert version of King Arthur and broadcast by BBC Radio from Cambridge in 1949, The Pajama Game at the London Coliseum (1955), Nekrassov by Jean-Paul Sartre at the Royal Court Theatre (1957), and Frank Loesser's musical Where's Charley? with Norman Wisdom at the Palace Theatre in London in 1958.

=== Film ===
His film roles included Councillor in Lady Godiva Rides Again (1951), Foreman of the Jury in Night Was Our Friend (1951), Dr Slammer in The Pickwick Papers (1952), Boxing Promoter in The Gambler and the Lady (1952), Governor in The Beggar's Opera (1953), Closterman in My Death is a Mockery (1952), Mr Patch in Our Girl Friday (1953), Alfred (uncredited) in The Million Pound Note (1954), Examiner (uncredited) in Doctor in the House (1954), Man of the Moment (1955), Bar customer in Confession (1955), Police Commissaire in Escapement (The Electronic Monster in the USA) (1960), Mayor in It's Trad, Dad! (1962), Dr George Thomas in Doctor at Sea (1955), Uncle in Pacific Destiny (1956), Reform Club member (uncredited) in Around the World in 80 Days (1956), Man in Cinema in Just My Luck (1957), First Gambler (uncredited) in The Two Faces of Dr. Jekyll (1960), Farm Patient (uncredited) in Doctor in Distress (1963), Tetchkinov in Licensed to Kill (1965), Second Minister in Chitty Chitty Bang Bang (1968), and Cellar Proprietor (uncredited) in The Assassination Bureau (1969).

=== Television ===
Television roles included the Archbishop of Rheims in Saint Joan for BBC Sunday-Night Theatre (1951), Lord Cantlemere in The Adventure of the Mazarin Stone (1951), Soames the butler in The Great Detective (1953), Louis XVIII in The Lost King (1958), Aylmer - Member of Drug Cartel in H. G. Wells' Invisible Man (1958), The Third Man (1959), Mr. Petheridge in Dixon of Dock Green (1962), Maigret (1962), Demaris in Ghost Squad (1964), Major Culcao in "The Third Bullet" episode of Crane (1964), Dr. Grimesby Roylott in Sherlock Holmes (1964), Philip Clewes in an episode of The Wednesday Play (1965), Abram Gobseck in The Rise and Rise of Cesar Birotteau (1965), Colonel Krauss in The Good Soldier Schweik, St. Laurent in The Troubleshooters (1966), Alderman Adam Sweater in The Ragged-Trousered Philanthropists (1967), an episode of Armchair Theatre (1968), and Richard Warde in The Shadow of the Tower (1972).

=== Voice actor ===
As a voice actor he played the Mayor in S.G. Hulme Beaman's Toytown for BBC's Children's Hour in the 1930s, and provided various voices in the first radio series of The Lord of the Rings in 1955 and 1956 for the BBC. He was the Ghost of Christmas Present in the 1971 animated film A Christmas Carol and in the same year he narrated the BBC Radio 4 programme What Did You Do in the War Felix?, concerning the work of BBC Radio Bristol during the Second World War.

He wrote two orchestral suites which were played by the London Philharmonic and other orchestras.

Felix Felton died in London in 1972 aged 61.

== Filmography ==
- Lady Godiva Rides Again (1951) - Councillor
- Night Was Our Friend (1951) - Foreman of the Jury
- My Death Is a Mockery (1952) - Closterman
- The Pickwick Papers (1952) - Dr. Slammer
- The Gambler and the Lady (1952) - Boxing Promoter (scenes deleted)
- The Beggar's Opera (1953) - Governor
- Our Girl Friday (1953) - Mr. Patch
- The Million Pound Note (1954) - Alfred (uncredited)
- Doctor in the House (1954) - Examiner (uncredited)
- Confession (1955) - The Business Man
- Doctor at Sea (1955) - Dr George Thomas
- Man of the Moment (1955) - Foreign Office File Seeker (uncredited)
- Pacific Destiny (1956) - Uncle
- The Weapon (1956) - Oscar Smithson
- Around the World in 80 Days (1956) - Reform Club Member (uncredited)
- Just My Luck (1957) - Man in Cinema
- Escapement (1958) - Police Commissaire
- The Two Faces of Dr. Jekyll (1960) - First Gambler (uncredited)
- It's Trad, Dad! (1962) - Mayor
- Doctor in Distress (1963) - Health Farm Patient (uncredited)
- Licensed to Kill (1965) - Tetchkinov
- Chitty Chitty Bang Bang (1968) - Minister #2
- The Assassination Bureau (1969) - Beer Cellar Proprietor (uncredited)
- Up in the Air (1969) - Sir Humphrey

== Publications ==
- The Radio-Play - Its Technique and Possibilities, Sylvan Press (1949)
- Thomas Love Peacock, Allen and Unwin (1973)
