= Frederick Wilson (film editor) =

British film editor and director (1912–1994)

Frederick Wilson (13 August 1912, London, UK – August 1994, Cambridge) was a British film editor and director.

== Selected filmography ==
=== Editor ===
- When Knights Were Bold (1936)
- London Melody (1937)
- Millions (1937)
- Stolen Life (1939)
- Under the Frozen Falls (1948)
- Doctor at Sea (1955)
- All for Mary (1955)
- The Iron Petticoat (1956)
- Checkpoint (1956)
- Doctor at Large (1957)
- Campbell's Kingdom (1957)
- The Wind Cannot Read (1958)
- The Captain's Table (1959)
- North West Frontier (1959)
- I Aim at the Stars (1960)
- Mysterious Island (1961)
- Reach for Glory (1963)
- Lancelot and Guinevere (1963)
- Girl in the Headlines (1963)
- The Third Secret (1964)
- Rattle of a Simple Man (1964)
- The Amorous Adventures of Moll Flanders (1965)
- The Quiller Memorandum (1966)
- Arabesque (1966)
- The Big Game (1973)

=== Director ===
- Poet's Pub (1949)
- Floodtide (1949) (also one of its three writers)
