= Dirk Bogarde =

English actor (1921–1999)

Sir Dirk Bogarde
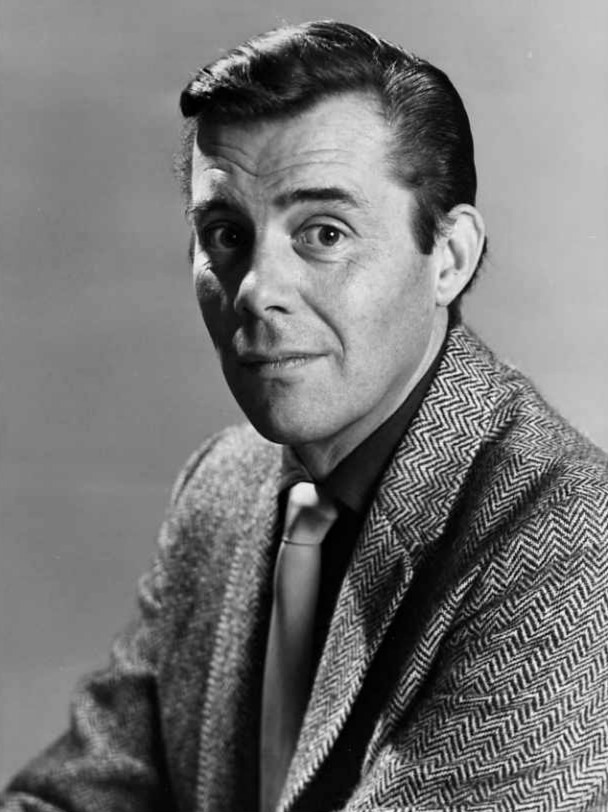
- Publicity portrait, 1964
- Born: Derek Jules Gaspard Ulric Niven van den Bogaerde; 28 March 1921; West Hampstead, London, England
- Died: 8 May 1999 (aged 78); Chelsea, London, England
- Occupations: Actor; novelist; screenwriter
- Years active: 1939–1990
- Partner: Anthony Forwood (1949–1988) (Forwood's death)
- Military career
- Allegiance: United Kingdom
- Branch: British Army
- Rank: Major
- Conflicts: World War II: European theatre; Pacific theatre
- Website: dirkbogarde.co.uk (Dirk Bogarde Estate)

Sir Dirk Bogarde (born Derek Jules Gaspard Ulric Niven van den Bogaerde; 28 March 1921 – 8 May 1999) was an English actor, novelist and screenwriter. Initially a matinée idol in films such as Doctor in the House (1954) for the Rank Organisation, he later acted in art house films, evolving from "heartthrob to icon of edginess".

In a second career, Bogarde wrote seven volumes of memoirs, six novels, and a volume of collected journalism, mainly from articles in The Daily Telegraph. He fought in the Second World War and over the course of five years reached the rank of major and was awarded seven medals. His poetry has been published in war anthologies, and a grey ink brush drawing, "Tents in Orchard. 1944", is in the collection of the British Museum.

Having come to prominence in films including The Blue Lamp in the early 1950s, Bogarde starred in the popular Doctor film series (1954–1963). He twice won the BAFTA Award for Best Actor in a Leading Role, for The Servant (1963) and Darling (1965). His other notable film roles included Victim (1961), Accident (1967), The Damned (1969), Death in Venice (1971), The Night Porter (1974), A Bridge Too Far (1977) and Despair (1978). He was appointed a Commander of the Order of Arts and Letters in 1990 and a Knight Bachelor in 1992.

== Early years and education ==
Bogarde was the eldest of three children born to Ulric van den Bogaerde (1892–1972) and Margaret Niven (1898–1980). Ulric was born in Perry Barr, Birmingham, of Flemish ancestry, and was art editor of The Times. Margaret Niven, a former actress, was Scottish, from Glasgow. Dirk Bogarde was born in a nursing home at 12 Hemstal Road, West Hampstead, London, and was baptised on 30 October 1921, at St. Mary's Church, Kilburn. He had a younger sister, Elizabeth (born 1924), and a brother, Gareth Ulric Van Den Bogaerde, an advertising film producer, born in July 1933 in Hendon.

Conditions in the family home in north London became cramped, so Bogarde was moved to Glasgow to stay with relatives of his mother. He stayed there for more than three years, returning at the end of 1937. He attended University College School and the former Allan Glen's High School of Science in Glasgow, a time he described in his autobiography as an unhappy one. Having secured a scholarship at Chelsea College of Art, Bogarde completed his two year course, and landed "a back-stage job as tea-boy at seven shillings and sixpence per week". A chance to act as a stand-in convinced Bogarde that "he needed some additional basic training, and he joined a provincial repertory group". His first on-screen appearance was as an uncredited extra in the George Formby comedy, Come On George! (1939).

== War service ==
During the war, Derek "Pip" Bogaerde served in the British Army, initially with the Royal Corps of Signals. He was then commissioned at the age of 22 into the Queen's Royal Regiment (West Surrey) on 2 April 1943 with the rank of second lieutenant. He served in both the European and Pacific theatres, principally as an intelligence officer.

=== D-Day and aftermath ===
Bogarde served as an intelligence officer with the 21st Army Group (Field Marshal Bernard Montgomery) as it liberated Europe. Taylor Downing's book, Spies in the Sky, tells of Bogarde's work in photo-reconnaissance in the aftermath of D-Day, moving through Normandy with Royal Canadian Air Force units. By July 1944, they were at the "B.8" airfield at Sommervieu, near Bayeux. As an air photographic interpreter with the rank of captain, Bogarde was later attached to the Second Army, where he selected ground targets in France, Holland and Germany for the Second Tactical Air Force and RAF Bomber Command. Villages on key routes were heavily bombed to prevent the Wehrmacht's armour from reaching the invasion lodgement areas. In a 1986 Yorkshire Television interview with Russell Harty, Bogarde recalled going on painting trips, sometimes to see the villages which he had selected as targets,

I found what I had thought in the rubble were a whole row of footballs, and they weren't footballs ... they were children's heads ... A whole school of kids, a convent, had been pulled out of school, and lined up in this little narrow alleyway between the buildings to save them from the bombing, and the whole thing had come in on top of them.

=== Bergen-Belsen concentration camp ===
Bogarde said he was one of the first Allied officers to reach the Bergen-Belsen concentration camp in Germany on 20 April 1945, an experience that had the most profound effect on him and about which he had difficulty speaking for many years afterwards.

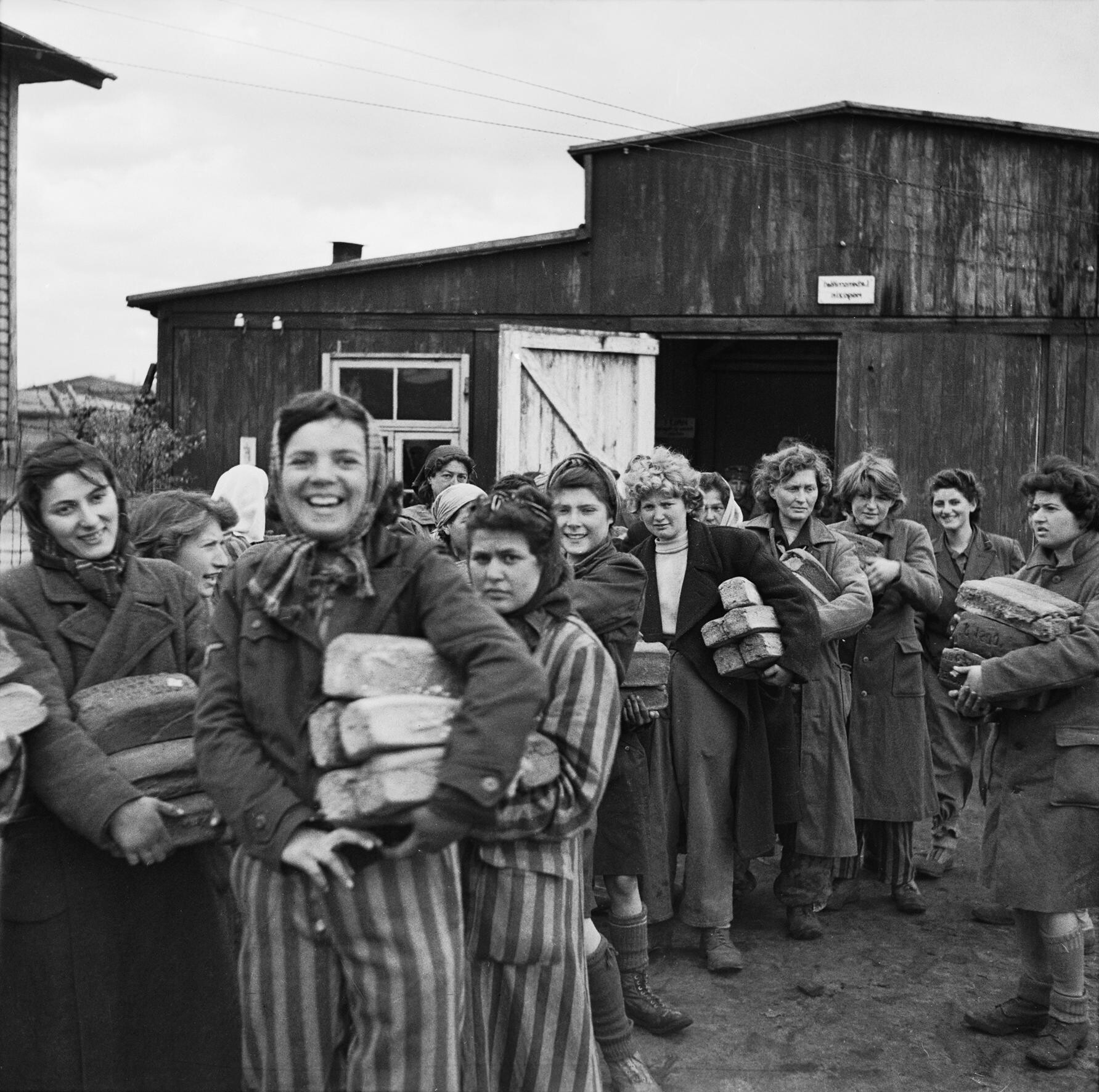
Women survivors in Bergen-Belsen collecting their bread ration after their liberation, April 1945

The gates were opened, and then I realised that I was looking at Dante's Inferno. And a girl came up who spoke English, because she recognised one of the badges, and she ... her breasts were like, sort of, empty purses, she had no top on, and a pair of man's pyjamas, you know, the prison pyjamas, and no hair ... and all around us there were mountains of dead people, I mean mountains of them, and they were slushy, and they were slimy.

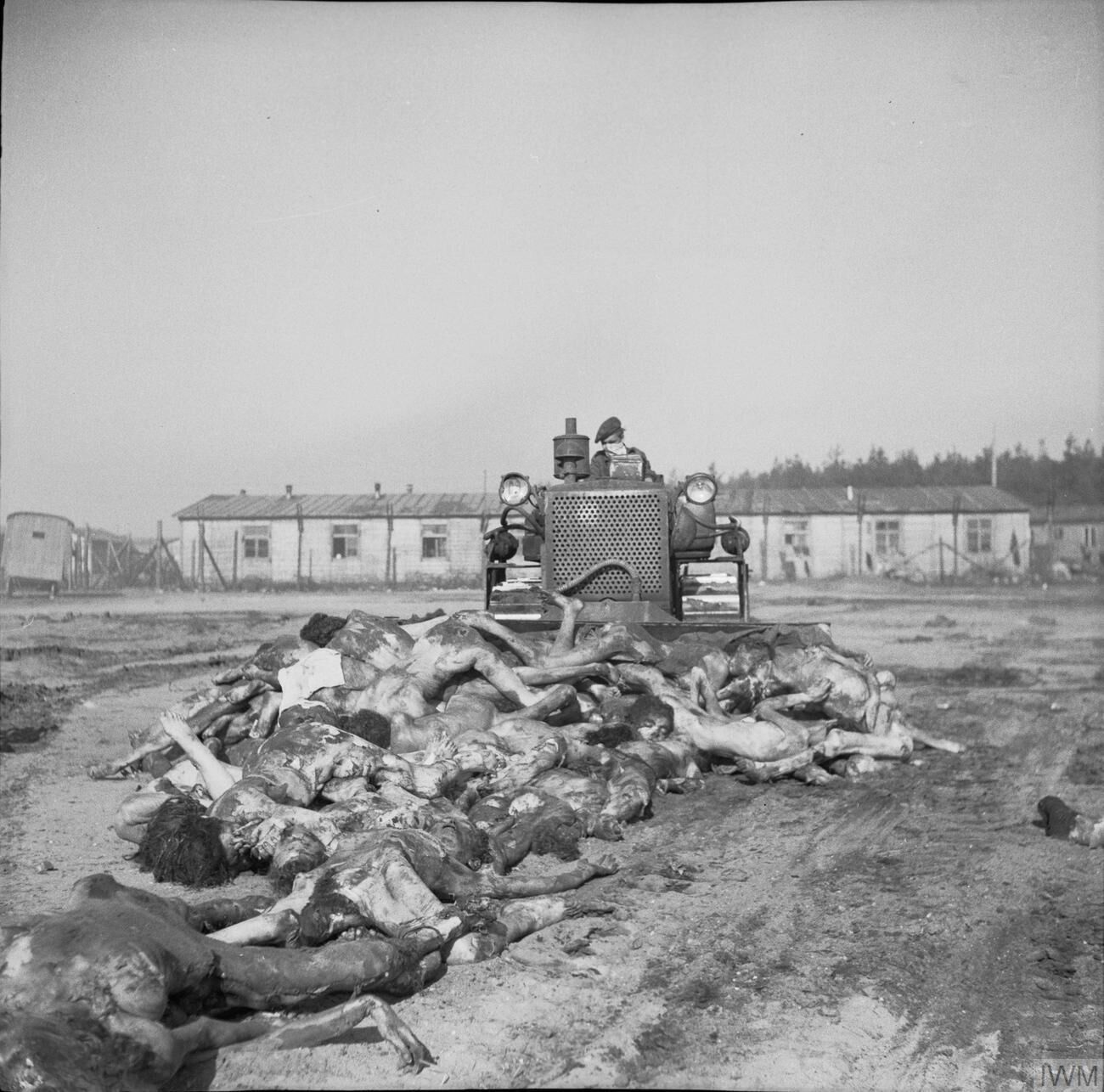
A British Army bulldozer pushes bodies into a mass grave at Belsen, 19 April 1945

There was some later dispute as to whether he really visited Belsen, although, more than a decade after publishing his biography, and following additional research, John Coldstream concluded that "it is now possible to state with some authority that he did at least set foot inside the camp".

=== India ===
Bogarde disclosed in a 1966 interview with Woman's Mirror that he was at fault in a multiple fatality car-crash on VJ Day in India, "I don't drive-I killed some people once, in a car crash, and I'll never drive again, not even on a film set. It was a long time ago, on VJ day, actually, in India, and they were all soldiers."

=== Long-term effects ===
The horror and revulsion at the cruelty and inhumanity that he said he witnessed left him with a deep-seated hostility towards Germany; in the late 1980s, he wrote that he would disembark from a lift rather than ride with a German of his generation. Nevertheless, three of his more memorable film roles were as Germans, one of them as a former SS officer in The Night Porter (1974).

Bogarde was most vocal towards the end of his life on voluntary euthanasia, of which he became a staunch proponent after witnessing the protracted death of his lifelong partner and manager Anthony Forwood (the former husband of actress Glynis Johns) in 1988. He gave an interview to John Hofsess, London executive director of the Voluntary Euthanasia Society,

My views were formulated as a 24-year-old officer in Normandy ... On one occasion, the jeep ahead hit a mine ... Next thing I knew, there was this chap in the long grass beside me. A gurgling voice said, "Help. Kill me." With shaking hands I reached for my small pouch to load my revolver ... I had to look for my bullets – by which time somebody else had already taken care of him. I heard the shot. I still remember that gurgling sound. A voice pleading for death.

== Career ==
Bogarde's London West End theatre-acting debut was in 1939, with the stage name "Derek Bogaerde", in J. B. Priestley's play Cornelius. In 1947 he appeared at the Fortune Theatre in Michael Clayton Hutton's Power Without Glory. After the war, he started pursuing film roles using the name "Dirk Bogarde". One of Bogarde's earliest starring roles in cinema was in the 1949 film Once a Jolly Swagman, where he played a daring speedway ace, riding for the Cobras. This was filmed at New Cross Speedway, in South East London, during one of the postwar years in which speedway was the biggest spectator sport in the UK.

=== Film stardom ===
Bogarde was contracted to the Rank Organisation under the wing of the prolific independent film producer Betty Box, who produced most of his early films and was instrumental in creating his matinée idol image. His Rank contract began following his appearance in Esther Waters (1948), his first credited role, replacing Stewart Granger. Another early role of his was in The Blue Lamp (1950), playing a hoodlum who shoots and kills a police constable (Jack Warner), whilst in So Long at the Fair (1950), a film noir, he played a handsome artist who comes to the rescue of Jean Simmons during the World's Fair in Paris. He also had roles as an accidental murderer in Hunted (or The Stranger in Between, 1952), a young wing commander in Bomber Command in Appointment in London (1953), and in Desperate Moment (1953), a wrongly imprisoned man who regains hope of clearing his name when he learns his sweetheart, Mai Zetterling, is still alive.

Bogarde featured as a medical student in Doctor in the House (1954), a film that made him one of the most popular British stars of the 1950s. The film co-starred Kenneth More and Donald Sinden, with James Robertson Justice as their crabby mentor. The production was initiated by Betty Box, who had picked up a copy of the book at Crewe during a long rail journey and had seen its possibility as a film. Box and Ralph Thomas had difficulties convincing Rank executives that people would go to a film about doctors and that Bogarde, who up to then had played character roles, had sex appeal and could play light comedy. They were allocated a modest budget and were allowed to use only available Rank contract artists. The film was the first of the Doctor film series based on the books by Richard Gordon.

In The Sleeping Tiger (1954), Bogarde played a neurotic criminal with co-star Alexis Smith. It was Bogarde's first film for American expatriate director Joseph Losey.

He did his second Doctor film, Doctor at Sea (1955), co-starring Brigitte Bardot in one of her first film roles; played a returning colonial who fights the Mau-Mau with Virginia McKenna and Donald Sinden in Simba (1955); Cast a Dark Shadow (1955), as a man who marries women for money and then murders them; The Spanish Gardener (1956), with Michael Hordern, Jon Whiteley and Cyril Cusack; Doctor at Large (1957), again with Donald Sinden, another entry in the Doctor film series, with later Bond girl Shirley Eaton; the Powell and Pressburger production Ill Met by Moonlight (1957) co-starring Marius Goring as German General Kreipe, kidnapped on Crete by Patrick "Paddy" Leigh Fermor (Bogarde) and W. Stanley Moss (David Oxley), and a fellow band of Cretan resistance fighters based on W. Stanley Moss' real-life account (Ill Met by Moonlight) of the Second World War abduction; A Tale of Two Cities (1958), a faithful retelling of Charles Dickens' classic; as a flight lieutenant in the Far East, who falls in love with a beautiful Japanese teacher Yoko Tani in The Wind Cannot Read (1958); The Doctor's Dilemma (1959), based on a play by George Bernard Shaw and co-starring Leslie Caron and Robert Morley; and Libel (1959), playing three roles and co-starring Olivia de Havilland. Bogarde was called "Rank's jewel in the crown."

=== Art house and European cinema ===
After leaving the Rank Organisation in the early 1960s, Bogarde abandoned his heart-throb image and "chose roles that challenged received morality and that pushed the scope of cinema". He starred in the film Victim (1961), playing a London barrister who fights the blackmailers of a young man with whom he has had a deeply emotional relationship. The young man commits suicide after being arrested for embezzlement, rather than ruin his beloved's career. In exposing the ring of extortionists, Bogarde's character risks his reputation and marriage to see that justice is done. Victim was the first British film to portray the humiliation to which gay people were exposed via discriminatory law and as a victimised minority; it is said to have had some effect upon the later Sexual Offences Act 1967 ending, to some extent, the illegal status of male homosexual activity.

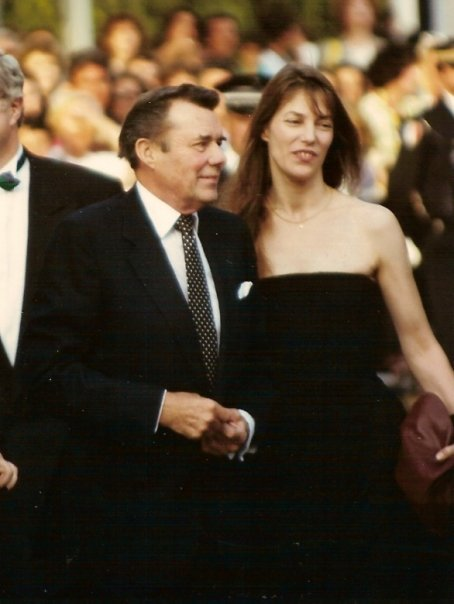
Bogarde with Jane Birkin, co-star in Daddy Nostalgie at the 1990 Cannes Film Festival

He again teamed up with Joseph Losey to play Hugo Barrett, a decadent valet, in The Servant (1963), with a script by Harold Pinter, and which garnered Bogarde a BAFTA Award. That year also saw the release of The Mind Benders, in which he played a professor conducting sensory deprivation experiments at Oxford University (and which anticipates Altered States [1980]). The following year saw another collaboration with Losey in the anti-war film King and Country, in which Bogarde played an army officer at a court-martial, reluctantly defending deserter Tom Courtenay. He won a second BAFTA for his role as a television broadcaster-writer Robert Gold in Darling (1965), directed by John Schlesinger. Bogarde, Losey and Pinter reunited for Accident (1967), which recounted the travails of Stephen, a bored Oxford University professor.

Our Mother's House (1967) is an off-beat film noir and the British entry at the Venice Film Festival, directed by Jack Clayton, in which Bogarde plays a ne'er-do-well father who descends upon "his" seven children on the death of their mother. In his first collaboration with Luchino Visconti in La Caduta degli dei (The Damned, 1969), Bogarde played German industrialist Frederick Bruckmann alongside Ingrid Thulin. Two years later Visconti was back at the helm when Bogarde portrayed Gustav von Aschenbach in Morte a Venezia (Death in Venice). In 1974, the controversial Il Portiere di notte (The Night Porter) saw Bogarde cast as an ex-Nazi, Max Aldorfer, co-starring Charlotte Rampling, and directed by Liliana Cavani. He played Claude, the lawyer son of a dying, drunken writer (John Gielgud) in the well-received, multidimensional French film Providence (1977), directed by Alain Resnais, and industrialist Hermann Hermann, who descends into madness in Despair (1978) directed by Rainer Werner Fassbinder. "It was the best performance I've ever done in my life," he later recounted. "Fassbinder... really screwed the film up. He tore it to pieces with a scissors." This led to Bogarde going on an extended hiatus. "And I thought, 'OK. Give it up'. So I gave it up and I didn't do another film for fourteen years." He returned one last time, as Daddy in Bertrand Tavernier's Daddy Nostalgie, (or These Foolish Things) (1991), co-starring Jane Birkin as his daughter.

=== Other later career roles ===
In the 1960s and 1970s Bogarde played opposite many renowned stars. The Angel Wore Red (1960) saw Bogarde playing an unfrocked priest who falls in love with cabaret entertainer Ava Gardner during the Spanish Civil War. The same year, in Song Without End he portrayed Hungarian composer and virtuoso pianist Franz Liszt, a film initially directed by Charles Vidor (who died during shooting) and completed by Bogarde's friend George Cukor, which was the actor's only foray into Hollywood. The campy The Singer Not the Song (1961) starred Bogarde as a Mexican bandit alongside John Mills as a priest.

In H.M.S. Defiant (or Damn the Defiant!) (1962), he played the sadistic Lieutenant Scott-Padget, co-starring Sir Alec Guinness; I Could Go On Singing (1963), co-starring Judy Garland in her final screen role; Hot Enough for June (or Agent 8¾) (1964), a James Bond-type spy spoof co-starring Robert Morley; Modesty Blaise (1966), a campy spy send-up playing arch villain Gabriel opposite Monica Vitti and Terence Stamp and directed by Joseph Losey; The Fixer (1968), based on Bernard Malamud's novel, co-starring Alan Bates; Sebastian (1968), as Sebastian, a mathematician working on code decryption, who falls in love with Susannah York, a decrypter in the all-female decoding office he heads for British Intelligence, also co-starring Sir John Gielgud and Lilli Palmer, co-produced by Michael Powell; Oh! What a Lovely War (1969), co-starring Sir John Gielgud and Sir Laurence Olivier and directed by Richard Attenborough; Justine (1969), directed by George Cukor; Le Serpent (1973), co-starring Henry Fonda and Yul Brynner.

A Bridge Too Far (1977), also starring Sean Connery, and again directed by Richard Attenborough, saw Bogarde give a controversial performance as Lieutenant General Frederick 'Boy' Browning. Bogarde claimed he had known General Browning from his time on Field Marshal Montgomery's staff during the war, and took issue with the largely negative portrayal of the general whom he played in A Bridge Too Far. Browning's widow, author Dame Daphne du Maurier, ferociously attacked his characterisation and "the resultant establishment fallout, much of it homophobic, wrongly convinced [Bogarde] that the newly ennobled Sir Richard [Attenborough] had deliberately contrived to scupper his chance of a knighthood." While several of his fellow actors were veterans, Bogarde was the only cast member to have served at the battles being depicted in the film, having entered Brussels the day after its liberation, and worked on the planning of Operation Market Garden.

=== Biographer and novelist ===
In 1977, Bogarde embarked on his second career as an author. Starting with a first volume A Postillion Struck by Lightning (an allusion to the phrase My postillion has been struck by lightning), he wrote a series of 15 books—nine volumes of memoirs and six novels, as well as essays, reviews, poetry and collected journalism. As a writer, Bogarde displayed a witty, elegant, highly literate and thoughtful style.

=== Missed roles ===
While under contract with the Rank Organisation, Bogarde was set to play the role of T. E. Lawrence in a proposed film Lawrence written by Terence Rattigan and to be directed by Anthony Asquith. On the eve of production, after a year of preparation by Bogarde, Rattigan and Asquith, the film was scrapped without full explanation—ostensibly for budgetary reasons—to the dismay of all three men. The abrupt scrapping of Lawrence, a role long researched and keenly anticipated by Bogarde, was among his greatest screen disappointments. (Rattigan reworked the script as a play, Ross, which opened to great success in 1960, initially with Alec Guinness playing Lawrence.) Bogarde was also reportedly considered for the title role in MGM's Doctor Zhivago (1965). Earlier, he had declined Louis Jourdan's role as Gaston in MGM's Gigi (1958).

His contract with Rank had precluded him from accepting the lead in the film adaptation of John Osborne's ground-breaking stage play, Look Back in Anger in 1959. In 1961, Bogarde was offered the chance to play Hamlet at the recently founded Chichester Festival Theatre by artistic director Sir Laurence Olivier but had to decline owing to film commitments. Bogarde later said that he regretted declining Olivier's offer and with it the chance to "really learn my craft".

== Personal life ==
After his acting career had given him some success, Bogarde moved from London and rented a cottage on the Bendrose Estate in Little Chalfont, Buckinghamshire, the family home of his business manager and partner, Anthony "Tote" Forwood. Bogarde subsequently lived in the area for some 40 years. After an unsuccessful attempt to gain planning permission to convert the estate into a housing development, Bogarde bought the adjoining Beel House and Park from William Lowndes for £4,000. After tearing down the servants' wing, Bogarde and Forwood had the main house redeveloped and refurbished "to bring more light" into the original 1700s core. They lived there until 1960, after the development of Dr Challoner's High School just 200 yards from Beel House. The couple subsequently moved to Drummer's Yard near Beaconsfield. Beel House was later owned by Ozzy and Sharon Osbourne, and Robert Kilroy Silk, who sold it for £6.5m in the mid-2010s.

Bogarde and Forwood later moved to Provence, France, then Italy, before returning to France. They moved back to London shortly before Forwood's death in 1988.

The critical and commercial failure of Song Without End affected his Hollywood leading man hopes. He struggled with the trauma of his active service, compounded by rapid fame, recounting, "First there was the war, and then the peace to cope with, and then suddenly I was a film star. It happened all too soon."

== Death ==
Bogarde, a heavy smoker, had a minor stroke in November 1987 while Forwood was dying of liver cancer and Parkinson's disease. In September 1996, he underwent angioplasty to unblock arteries leading to his heart and suffered a massive stroke following the operation. He was paralysed on one side of his body, which affected his speech, and from then on used a wheelchair. He then completed the final volume of his autobiography, which covered the effects of the stroke, and published an edition of his collected journalism, mainly from The Daily Telegraph. Bogarde spent some time with his friend Lauren Bacall the day before he died at his home in London from a heart attack on 8 May 1999, aged 78. His ashes were scattered at his former estate Le Pigeonnier in Grasse, southern France.

== Honours and awards ==
Bogarde was nominated five times as Best Actor by BAFTA, winning twice, for The Servant in 1963 and for Darling in 1965. He also received the London Film Critics Circle Lifetime Award in 1991. He made a total of 63 films between 1939 and 1991. In 1983, he received a special award for service to the cinema at the Cannes Festival. He was awarded the British Film Institute Fellowship in 1987. In 1988, Bogarde was honoured with the first BAFTA Tribute Award for an outstanding contribution to cinema.

Bogarde was created a Knight Bachelor in the United Kingdom in 1992, awarded the Commandeur de l'Ordre des Arts et des Lettres by the French government in 1990, an honorary doctorate of literature on 4 July 1985 by St Andrews University in Scotland, and an honorary doctorate of letters in 1993 by the University of Sussex in England. In 1984, Bogarde served as president of the jury at the Cannes Film Festival, the first British person to serve in this capacity.

== Filmography ==
Year	Title	Role	Notes
1939	Come On George!	Extra	Uncredited
1947	Rope	Charlies Granillo	TV movie
1947	The Case of Helvig Delbo		TV special
1947	Power Without Glory	Cliff	TV movie using cast of stage production
1947	Dancing with Crime	Police Radio Caller	Uncredited
1948	Esther Waters	William Latch	First leading role in film
1948	Quartet	George Bland (segment "The Alien Corn")	
1949	Once a Jolly Swagman	Bill Fox	
1949	Dear Mr. Prohack	Charles Prohack	
1949	Boys in Brown	Alfie Rawlins	
1950	The Blue Lamp	Tom Riley	First box office hit
1950	So Long at the Fair	George Hathaway	First film produced by Betty Box
1950	The Woman in Question	R.W. (Bob) Baker	
1951	Blackmailed	Stephen Mundy	
1952	Hunted	Chris Lloyd	
1952	Penny Princess	Tony Craig	
1952	The Gentle Gunman	Matt Sullivan	
1953	Appointment in London	Wing Commander Tim Mason	
1953	Desperate Moment	Simon Van Halder	
1954	They Who Dare	Lt. David Graham	
1954	Doctor in the House	Dr Simon Sparrow	Bogarde's first film with director Ralph Thomas
1954	The Sleeping Tiger	Frank Clemmons	Bogarde's first film with director Joseph Losey
1954	For Better, for Worse	Tony Howard	Directed by Val Guest
1954	The Sea Shall Not Have Them	Flight Sgt. MacKay	Bogare's first film with director Lewis Gilbert
1955	Simba	Alan Howard	
1955	Doctor at Sea	Dr Simon Sparrow	2nd "doctor" film
1955	Cast a Dark Shadow	Edward "Teddy" Bare	
1956	The Spanish Gardener	Jose	
1957	Ill Met by Moonlight	Maj. Patrick Leigh Fermor a.k.a. Philedem	Directed by Michael Powell
1957	Doctor at Large	Dr Simon Sparrow	3rd "doctor" film
1957	Campbell's Kingdom	Bruce Campbell	
1958	A Tale of Two Cities	Sydney Carton	
1958	The Wind Cannot Read	Flight Lt Michael Quinn	
1958	The Doctor's Dilemma	Louis Dubedat	First Hollywood movie
1959	Libel	Sir Mark Sebastian Loddon / Frank Welney / Number Fifteen	
1960	The Angel Wore Red	Arturo Carrera	
1960	Song Without End	Franz Liszt	Nominated – Golden Globe Award for Best Actor – Motion Picture Musical or Comedy
1961	The Singer Not the Song	Anacleto	
1961	Victim	Melville Farr	Nominated – BAFTA Award for Best Actor in a Leading Role
1962	H.M.S. Defiant	1st Lt. Scott-Padget	
1962	We Joined the Navy	Dr. Simon Sparrow	Cameo appearance, uncredited
1962	The Password Is Courage	Sergeant Major Charles Coward	
1963	The Mind Benders	Dr. Henry Longman	
1963	I Could Go On Singing	David Donne	
1963	Doctor in Distress	Dr Simon Sparrow	Bogarde's 4th "doctor" film
1963	The Servant	Hugo Barrett	BAFTA Award for Best Actor in a Leading Role
1964	Hot Enough for June	Nicholas Whistler	
1964	King and Country	Capt. Hargreaves	
1964	The High Bright Sun	Major McGuire	Bogarde's last movie with Betty Box and Ralph Thomas
1964	Little Moon of Alban	Kenneth Boyd	
1965	Darling	Robert Gold	BAFTA Award for Best Actor in a Leading Role
1966	Modesty Blaise	Gabriel	
1966	Blithe Spirit	Charles Condomine	
1967	Accident	Stephen	Nominated – BAFTA Award for Best Actor in a Leading Role
1967	Our Mother's House	Charlie Hook	Nominated – BAFTA Award for Best Actor in a Leading Role
1968	Sebastian	Sebastian	
1968	The Fixer	Bibikov	
1969	Oh! What a Lovely War	Stephen	
1969	Justine	Pursewarden	
1969	The Damned	Frederick Bruckmann	
1970	Upon This Rock	Bonnie Prince Charlie	
1971	Death in Venice	Gustav von Aschenbach	Nominated – BAFTA Award for Best Actor in a Leading Role
1973	Night Flight from Moscow	Philip Boyle	
1974	The Night Porter	Maximilian Theo Aldorfer	
1975	Permission to Kill	Alan Curtis	
1977	Providence	Claude Langham	
1977	A Bridge Too Far	Lt. Gen. Frederick 'Boy' Browning	
1978	Despair	Hermann Hermann	
1981	The Patricia Neal Story	Roald Dahl	
1986	May We Borrow Your Husband?	William Harris	
1988	The Vision	James Marriner	
1990	Daddy Nostalgie	Daddy	Final film role

=== British box office ranking ===
For several years British film exhibitors voted Bogarde one of the most popular local stars at the box office:

- 1953 – 5th
- 1954 – 2nd (9th-most popular international star)
- 1955 – 1st (also most popular international star)
- 1956 – 3rd
- 1957 – 1st (also most popular international star)
- 1958 – 2nd (also 2nd-most popular international star)
- 1959 – 5th
- 1960 – 9th-most popular international star
- 1961 – 8th-most popular international star
- 1963 – 9th-most popular international star

== Other works ==
=== Autobiographies and memoirs ===
- A Postillion Struck by Lightning, 1977
- Snakes and Ladders, 1978
- An Orderly Man, 1983
- Backcloth, 1986
- A Particular Friendship, 1989
- Great Meadow: An Evocation, 1992
- A Short Walk from Harrods, 1993
- Cleared for Take-Off, 1995
- For the Time Being: Collected Journalism, 1998
- Dirk Bogarde: The Complete Autobiography (contains the first four autobiographies only)

=== Novels ===
- A Gentle Occupation, 1980
- Voices in the Garden, 1981
- West of Sunset, 1984
- Jericho, 1991
- A Period of Adjustment, 1994
- Closing Ranks, 1997

=== Discography ===
- Lyrics for Lovers (London Records, 1960)
- as Njegus in The Merry Widow (speaking role—of a narration by Tom Stoppard—in a complete recording of the opera conducted by Franz Welser-Möst)
- He appeared in Saki: a celebration at the National Theatre, with Tim Pigott-Smith, Barbara Leigh-Hunt and Zoë Wanamaker, later issued as an audio book.
