= Doctor at Sea (film) =

- Original British 1955 quad film poster
- Directed by: Ralph Thomas
- Screenplay by: Nicholas Phipps; Richard Gordon; Jack Davies
- Based on: Doctor at Sea by Richard Gordon
- Produced by: Betty E. Box
- Starring: Dirk Bogarde; Brigitte Bardot; James Robertson Justice; Brenda De Banzie; Joan Sims
- Cinematography: Ernest Steward
- Edited by: Frederick Wilson
- Music by: Bruce Montgomery
- Production company: Group Film Productions
- Distributed by: Rank Film Distributors
- Release date: 12 July 1955
- Running time: 93 minutes
- Country: United Kingdom
- Language: English
- Box office: 1,111,404 admissions (France)

Doctor at Sea is a 1955 British comedy film, directed by Ralph Thomas, produced by Betty E. Box, and based on Richard Gordon's 1953 novel of the same name. This was the second of seven films in the Doctor series, following the hugely popular Doctor in the House from the previous year. Once again, Richard Gordon participated in the screenwriting, together with Nicholas Phipps and Jack Davies, and once again Dirk Bogarde played the lead character Dr Simon Sparrow. The cast also includes James Robertson Justice and Joan Sims from the first film, but this time playing different characters. This was Brigitte Bardot's first English-speaking film.

== Plot ==
To escape his employer’s daughter, who has amorous designs on him, Dr Simon Sparrow signs on as medical officer on a cargo ship, the SS Lotus. The ship is commanded by the hot-tempered and authoritarian Captain Wentworth Hogg.

Sparrow overcomes initial seasickness and settles into life on board. After arriving in a Brazilian port, Sparrow and the rest of the officers enjoy themselves in a local bar. A hostess working there cajoles two hundred cruzeiros from Sparrow, and he meets Hélène Colbert, a young French woman who is a nightclub singer.

Captain Hogg is ordered to take on two female passengers, Muriel Mallet, the daughter of the chairman of the shipping company, and her friend Hélène for the return trip. The unmarried Hogg is pursued by Muriel, who, claiming that she has her father's ear, promises him almost certain promotion to the rank of commodore within the company if he were to marry her.

Romance blossoms between Sparrow and Hélène, but she declines his tentative marriage proposal. However, as they reach home port, Sparrow finds out that she has received a telegram offering her a job in Rio de Janeiro, which he had told her is the destination for his ship on its next trip. The film ends as they embrace and kiss.

== Cast ==
- Dirk Bogarde as Dr Simon Sparrow
- Brenda De Banzie as Muriel Mallet
- Brigitte Bardot as Hélène Colbert
- James Robertson Justice as Captain Hogg
- Maurice Denham as Steward Easter
- Michael Medwin as Third Officer Trail
- Hubert Gregg as Second Officer Archer
- James Kenney as Fellowes
- Raymond Huntley as Captain Beamish
- Geoffrey Keen as Chief Officer Hornbeam
- George Coulouris as Chippy, ship's carpenter
- Noel Purcell as Corbie
- Jill Adams as Jill
- Joan Sims as Wendy Thomas
- Cyril Chamberlain as Whimble
- Toke Townley as Jenkins
- Thomas Heathcote as Wilson
- Abe Barker as Old Harry
- Frederick Piper as Sandeman
- Michael Shepley as Jill's father
- Eugene Deckers as Brazilian Chief of Police
- Mary Laura Wood as Brazilian redhead charging 200 cruzeiros
- Ekali Sokou as Phyllis (party guest with Trail)
- Joan Hickson as Mrs Thomas
- Felix Felton as Dr George Thomas
- Paul Carpenter as Captain Draper (uncredited)
- Martin Benson as Brazilian head waiter (uncredited)
- Harold Kasket as Brazilian policeman placing bets
- Jill Melford as party guest with Fellowes (uncredited)
- Norman Pierce as crew member at flagpole (uncredited)

== Production ==
Filming took place on the ship Agamemnon in January 1955 and at Pinewood Studios the following month. Brigitte Bardot made the film just before becoming internationally famous in And God Created Woman.

== Reception ==
=== Box office ===
The film was the third most popular movie at the British box office in 1955, after The Dam Busters and White Christmas. Thomas claimed in 1956 that it made half a million pounds profit.

Doctor at Sea was one of the top five money-earners in the United Kingdom between 1951 and 1960. In October 1957 Rank claimed the film and Doctor in the House had been seen by 24 million Britons.

=== Critical ===
Variety accused Rank studios of playing safe, writing that "Doctor at Sea does not rise to the same laugh-provoking heights as its predecessor... By far the most dominating performance of the cast is given hy Justice. He towers-above the others and is the focal point of every scene in which he appears. Bogarde plays’ the ’medico with a pleasing quiet restraint and Brigitte Bardot, a looker, from Paris; has an acting talent to match her charm. She’s a positive asset to the production."

The Radio Times also found it "short on truly comic incident, and the shipboard location is limiting", but Allmovie wrote, "Often funnier than its predecessor, Doctor at Sea proved the viability of the "Doctor" series."

Daily Telegraph said "the treatment is more farcical and scrappy but the laughs are there." Filmink called it "breezy ‘50s British fun – in colour, full of high spirits, an accomplished cast well led by Dirk Bogarde, which cleverly rehashes events of the first film by redoing them at sea. Bogarde spends the majority of the film avoiding women, even Bardot, who is very cute and winning, like the whole movie really. It’s a sweet relic of a bygone era."

== Awards ==
- Nominated, 1956 BAFTA Film Award, Best British Screenplay, Nicholas Phipps and Jack Davies.

== Sequels ==
This was the second installment of the Doctor series of films, with Bogarde featuring in the first three.
