= Doctor (film series) =

British comedy film series

The Doctor films were developed from the series of comic novels by British physician Richard Gordon covering the antics of a group of young doctors. The early films featured Dirk Bogarde in the lead as Doctor Sparrow and Donald Sinden as Benskin. Later films starred Leslie Phillips.

The films were directed by Ralph Thomas and produced by Betty Box. The films inspired several spin-off television series.

The first film, Doctor in the House, was initiated by Betty Box, who picked up a copy of the book at Crewe during a long rail journey. She saw its possibility as a film, but Box and Ralph Thomas had a job convincing Rank executives that people would go to a film about doctors, and that Bogarde, who up to then had played spivs and World War Two heroes, had sex appeal and could play light comedy. They got a low budget, and were only allowed to use available Rank contract artists.

== Films ==
- Doctor in the House (1954) — with Bogarde and Sinden
- Doctor at Sea (1955) — with Bogarde
- Doctor at Large (1957) — with Bogarde and Sinden
- Doctor in Love (1960) — with Michael Craig and Leslie Phillips instead of Bogarde
- Doctor in Distress (1963) — with Bogarde
- Doctor in Clover (1966) — with Phillips.
- Doctor in Trouble (1970) — with Phillips

=== Television series ===
A successful television series, Doctor in the House and various similar names, followed, from London Weekend Television, Seven Network (Australia) and the British Broadcasting Corporation .
