= Ralph Thomas =

English film director (1915–2001)

- Born: 10 August 1915; Hull, East Riding of Yorkshire, England
- Died: 17 March 2001 (aged 85); London, England
- Occupation: Film director
- Years active: 1956–1993
- Relatives: Jeremy Thomas (son); Gerald Thomas (brother)

Ralph Philip Thomas (10 August 1915 – 17 March 2001) was an English film director who directed the Doctor film series.

Thomas cast the actor James Robertson Justice in many of his films. He often worked with the producer Betty E. Box, who was married to Carry On producer Peter Rogers.

== Early life ==
Ralph Philip Thomas was born on 10 August 1915 in Hull, East Riding of Yorkshire. Thomas was a nephew of producer and director Victor Saville.

He studied law at Middlesex University College.

== Career ==
=== Early career ===
Thomas entered the film business as a clapper boy at Shepperton Studios in 1932 during his summer vacation while at college. Following graduation, instead of becoming a lawyer he decided to enter the film industry, and became an apprentice at Shepperton Studios, working as a clapper boy and then in the editing room, the sound department and art department. From 1932 to 1934, Thomas worked predominantly on "quota quickies". He discovered he loved editing the most and worked predominantly as an editor for the next few years, including a period working alongside David Lean. When his employer, Premiere Stafford, went broke he worked for a while as a journalist at the Bristol Evening Post for over a year. He returned to editing before joining the army in 1939.

During the Second World War, Thomas served with the 9th Lancers rising to the rank of Major and being awarded the Military Cross. He took part in the Battle of El Alamein.

=== Post-war career ===
Thomas left the army in 1945 and re-entered the film industry, although he could only gain work as an assistant editor. He assisted editing Odd Man Out (1946) then began making film trailers for the Rank Organisation. He worked his way up to becoming head of Rank's trailer department as well as writing films. Thomas later said making trailers was "enormously useful" because he "learned a lot of the technique of how the varying directors whose pictures I had worked on operated. Also, it teaches one a great deal of discipline about brevity in story telling".

=== Early films as director ===
Sydney Box had enjoyed Thomas's trailer for Miranda (1948) and when a position of director came up due to an unexpected illness, Thomas made his directoral debut in Once Upon a Dream (1949).

He made a two more comedies for Sydney Box: Helter Skelter then Traveller's Joy (both also 1949). Thomas later recalled this time as:

Enormously exciting and invigorating. We knew that we were not always doing very creative work, but that there was a chance to gain experience and that this wasn't going to last... You were quite likely to finish shooting on Friday, plan to go into the cutting rooms on Monday to look over your stuff and get your cut ready, then go for a drink, and you'd be given another script and be told, 'The sets are standing and you start on Monday – this is the cast!' It wasn't necessarily good and we didn't get a lot of money, but it was regular.

While assembling trailers, Thomas met Sydney Box's sister Betty, and the two of them struck up a rapport. In 1949 it was announced Betty Box, Muriel Box and Thomas had formed Feature Film Facilities, to make six or seven films, starting with an adaptation of several Guy de Maupassant stories. This never happened. However, when Thomas left Sydney Box to go under contract with the Rank Organisation to make The Clouded Yellow (1950), he brought Betty with him as a producer. They ended up making over twenty films together.

Box defined their relationship in a 1973 interview:

I'm a natural pessimist and he's a natural optimist. I'm always in the depths of despair and he is always full of joy. Good teams are often made of opposites... We (she and Ralph Thomas) do have awful, boring fights. Directing a film is not an easy job. For any man to stay sweet and gentle through eight weeks of purgatory is impossible.

Their second film together was Appointment with Venus (1951), a war comedy with David Niven. This was followed by Venetian Bird (1952), a thriller shot partly on location in Venice.

Thomas then made several comedies, A Day to Remember (1953), The Dog and the Diamonds (also 1953) and Mad About Men (1954). It was a film released between the last two, however, which established his career.

=== Doctor in the House ===
They had a massive box office hit with Doctor in the House (1954). The film made a star of Dirk Bogarde and led to a number of sequels, all of which would be directed by Thomas. Thomas later reflected, "In a way it doesn't really do your career any good to have such a big success early on... you can easily get thrown off course because you get offered all sorts of things which you don't really want to do and shouldn't do. You become easily flattered because you like this first taste of fame."

However, the films gave Thomas and Box a great deal of control. Thomas says whenever they made a "doctor" film, Rank would finance another movie they wanted "as long as the thing we wanted to make had a reasonable budget and was not too idiotic."

Thomas made a war film, Above Us the Waves (1955), before doing a second "Doctor", Doctor at Sea (also 1955). Both these movies would be among the most successful films at the British box office in 1955. He followed them with the less popular Checkpoint (1956), a noir crime thriller concerning car racing starring Anthony Steel and featuring location filming in Europe.

The success of Doctor in the House saw Thomas offered to direct the Cold War comedy, The Iron Petticoat with Bob Hope and Katharine Hepburn. The film was a financial success but production was an unhappy experience for Thomas. It was the only time he worked with major Hollywood stars.

He returned to "Doctor" series with Doctor at Large (1957), the second most popular movie at the British box office in its year of release. This success encouraged Rank to finance Thomas and Box for a series of expensive adventure films starring Dirk Bogarde shot on location, aimed at the international market: Campbell's Kingdom (1957), A Tale of Two Cities (1958) and The Wind Cannot Read (also 1958). None of these achieved the financial success of the "Doctor" movies, although the last two in particular are regarded among Thomas' finest works.

Also on a large scale was The 39 Steps (1959), starring Kenneth More in a remake of the Alfred Hitchcock classic, which was a box-office success. Thomas returned to comedy with the smaller budgeted Upstairs and Downstairs (also 1959), starring Michael Craig.

=== 1960s ===
Thomas and Box wanted to make two riskier films, a story about nuns, Conspiracy of Hearts (1960), and a political story No Love for Johnnie (1961). Rank agreed to finance provided they made a fourth doctor film: Doctor in Love (1960) was the result; despite Dirk Bogarde refusing to take part (Michael Craig took over the lead), it was still a big hit. Conspiracy of Hearts was also highly successful and has been called one of his best movies. No Love for Johnnie was a flop, but was highly acclaimed critically – perhaps the most admired of all Thomas' movies.

Thomas and Box then made two low-budget comedies. No My Darling Daughter (1961) and A Pair of Briefs (1962). Thomas did some uncredited work on Carry On Cruising (1962), before making a university drama with Box, The Wild and the Willing (1962), an "angry young man"-style melodrama which was the first film for Ian McShane, John Hurt and Samantha Eggar.

None of these were particularly popular at the box office so Thomas returned to "doctor" films with Doctor in Distress (1963). This starred Dirk Bogarde, who had been encouraged to reprise his role as Simon Sparrow one more time. In return, Rank agreed to finance Thomas and Bogarde in two more expensive films: the James Bond spoof Hot Enough for June (1964) and a serious look at the Cyprus Emergency, The High Bright Sun (1964).

Neither of the latter two were particularly popular. Thomas returned to more sure-fire material with a sixth "Doctor", Doctor in Clover (1966). He then made two Bulldog Drummond films, both starring Richard Johnson, Deadlier Than the Male (1967) and Some Girls Do (1969). In between he directed Rod Taylor in a poorly-received thriller, Nobody Runs Forever (also known as The High Commissioner, 1968).

=== 1970s ===
Thomas shot the last "doctor" film, Doctor in Trouble in 1970. It made money but Thomas and Box were getting sick of the series and sold the franchise to television. They had a big hit Percy (1971) which led to a sequel, Percy's Progress (1974). However, other films Thomas made around this time – Quest for Love (1971), an unusual sci-fi love story starring Joan Collins, and The Love Ban (1973) – were less successful.

The downturn in production in the British film industry of the 1970s affected Thomas' ability to raise finance for his films and he began to work increasingly in television. His last feature was A Nightingale Sang in Berkeley Square (1979).

== Personal life ==
Thomas was the brother of Gerald Thomas, who later became a film director on the Carry On... series, and his son is the Academy Award-winning film producer Jeremy Thomas.

== Death and legacy ==
Thomas died on 17 March 2001 in London.

He is commemorated with a green plaque on The Avenues, Kingston upon Hull.

Thomas later described himself as:

A sort of journeyman picture maker and I was generally happy to make anything I felt to be halfway respectable. So my volume of work was enormous; I had a lot of energy and made all kinds of pictures. If you make all kinds, you score a hit sometimes. I made thrillers, comedies, love stories, war stories, one or two adventure things. Some filmmakers have a lot of talent and genius for it; others simply have a lot of energy and I'm afraid I belong in the latter category!

== Filmography ==
Director

- Once Upon a Dream (1949)
- Traveller's Joy (1949)
- Helter Skelter (1949)
- The Clouded Yellow (1951)
- Appointment with Venus (1951)
- Venetian Bird (1952)
- A Day to Remember (1953)
- The Dog and the Diamonds (1953)
- Mad About Men (1954)
- Doctor in the House (1954)
- Above Us the Waves (1955)
- Doctor at Sea (1955)
- Checkpoint (1956)
- The Iron Petticoat (1956)
- Doctor at Large (1957)
- Campbell's Kingdom (1957)
- A Tale of Two Cities (1958)
- The Wind Cannot Read (1958)
- The 39 Steps (1959)
- Upstairs and Downstairs (1959)
- Conspiracy of Hearts (1960)
- Doctor in Love (1960)
- No Love for Johnnie (1961)
- No My Darling Daughter (1961)
- A Pair of Briefs (1962)
- The Wild and the Willing (1962)
- Doctor in Distress (1963)
- Hot Enough for June (1964)
- The High Bright Sun (1964) (US: McGuire, Go Home)
- Doctor in Clover (1966)
- Deadlier Than the Male (1967)
- Nobody Runs Forever (1968)
- Some Girls Do (1969)
- Doctor in Trouble (1970)
- Percy (1971)
- Quest for Love (1971)
- The Love Ban (1973)
- Percy's Progress (1974)
- The Insurance Man from Ingersoll (1975) (TV movie)
- A Nightingale Sang in Berkeley Square (1979)

Writer

- Doctor's Daughters (1981) (TV series)

Producer

- Pop Pirates (1984)

Editor

- Second Bureau (1936)
- Return of a Stranger (1937)

=== Unfinished films ===
- Untitled film about British policewomen, a female version of The Blue Lamp
- The Red Hot Ferrari
- The Undertakers Man
- The Reckless Years, the story of Byron and Shelley (1974)
