= James Robertson Justice =

British actor (1907–1975)

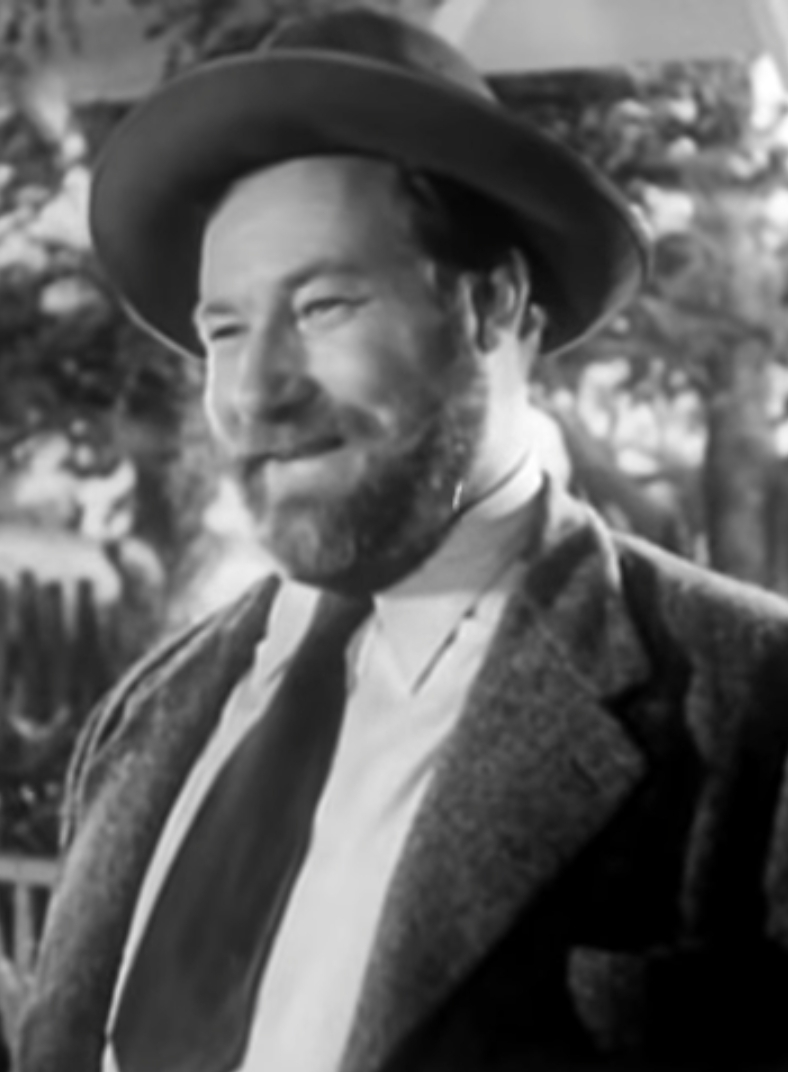
- Justice in The Lady Says No (1952)
- Born: James Norval Harald Justice; 15 June 1907; Lee, London, England
- Died: 2 July 1975 (aged 68); Romsey, Hampshire, England
- Other name: Seamus Mor na Feaseg
- Occupation: Actor
- Years active: 1944–1971
- Spouses: Dillys Ethel Hayden (m. 1941; div. 1968) Irene von Meyendorff (m. 1975)
- Children: 1

James Robertson Justice (born James Norval Harald Justice; 15 June 1907 – 2 July 1975) was a British actor. He often portrayed pompous authority figures in comedies, including each of the seven films in the Doctor series. He also co-starred with Gregory Peck in several adventure movies, notably The Guns of Navarone. Born in south-east London to a Scottish father, he became prominent in Scottish public life, helping to launch Scottish Television (STV) and serving as Rector of the University of Edinburgh (1957–60 and 1963–66).

== Early life ==
Despite his later Scottish claims, James Norval Harald Justice was born on 15 June 1907 in Lee, a suburb of Lewisham in south-east London. He was the son of Aberdeen-born mining engineer James Norval Justice and Edith (née Burgess), Justice was educated at St Hugh's School, Bickley, Kent, and Marlborough College in Wiltshire. He later studied science at University College London, but left after a year and became a geology student at the University of Bonn, where he again left after just a year.

== Various jobs and travel ==
Justice returned to the UK in 1927, and became a journalist with Reuters in London alongside Ian Fleming, the creator of James Bond. After a year, he emigrated to Canada, where he worked as an insurance salesman, taught English at a boys' school, became a lumberjack and mined for gold. He came back to Britain penniless, working his passage on a Dutch freighter washing dishes in the ship's galley to pay his fare.

=== Ice hockey ===
On his return to Britain, he served as secretary of the British Ice Hockey Association in the early 1930s and managed the national team at the 1932 European Championships in Berlin to a seventh-place finish. He combined his administrative duties in 1931–32 with a season as goalie with the London Lions.

=== Motor racing ===
Justice was entered in a Wolseley Hornet Special in the JCC Thousand Mile Race at Brooklands on 3 and 4 May 1932. The car was unplaced. The following year a "J. Justice (J.A.P. Special)" competed in the Brighton Speed Trials: "Justice's machine 'Tallulah' noisily expired before the end of the course, and was pushed back to the start by way of the arcade under the terrace." The Brighton event was won by Whitney Straight and according to Denis Jenkinson: "Flitting round the periphery of the team was James Robertson Justice." In February 1934, Straight took delivery of a new Maserati: "Jimmy Justice went off to Italy to collect the first car which was 8CM number 3011." Motor Sport reported in 1963: "We remember him at Lewes with a G.N. and in a Relay Race with a Wolseley Hornet."

=== International peacekeeper ===
In the mid 1930s Justice became a member of the League of Nations's international peacekeeping force in the Territory of the Saar Basin. The 3,300-strong International Force in the Saar had been established under a mandate originating in the Treaty of Versailles in 1919. Britain (1,500), Italy (1,300), Sweden (260) and the Netherlands (250) had agreed to provide troops to guard this region of occupied Germany, which was governed by both France and Germany.

== Military service ==
After the Saar, Justice fought with the Republicans in the Spanish Civil War in the late 1930s. It was during this time that he first grew his signature bushy beard, which he retained throughout his career. In 1939, he joined the Royal Naval Volunteer Reserve at the outbreak of the Second World War. After sustaining a shrapnel wound in 1943, he was honourably discharged from the service with a pension.

== Acting career ==
Following his Navy discharge, Justice pursued acting after joining the Players' Theatre in London. Under the chairmanship of Leonard Sachs, who was latterly chairman of BBC television's The Good Old Days, the club would stage Victorian music hall nights. Substituting for Sachs one night, Justice was recommended for the film For Those in Peril (1944).

With his domineering personality, bulky physique (he played rugby for Beckenham RFC First XV in the 1924–25 season alongside Johnnie Cradock who would become the partner of 1950s TV chef Fanny), and rich, booming voice, Justice was soon established as a major supporting actor in British comedy films. His first leading role was as headmaster in the film Vice Versa (1948), written and directed by Peter Ustinov, who cast Justice partly because he had been "a collaborator of my father's at Reuters". Justice made it to Walt Disney in a film adaptation of Robin Hood called The Story of Robin Hood (1952) where he took the role of Little John. Justice also was the demanding surgeon Sir Lancelot Spratt in the "Doctor" series of films of the 1950s and 1960s, beginning with Doctor in the House (1954), playing the role for which he is possibly best remembered. In his films he was sometimes credited as Seumas Mòr na Feusag (Scottish Gaelic, translation: Big James with the Beard), James R. Justice, James Robertson or James Robertson-Justice.

On 31 August 1957, he helped launch the TV station Scottish Television (STV), hosting the channel's first show, This is Scotland. From 1957 to 1960, and again from 1963 to 1966, he was Rector of the University of Edinburgh. In the war film The Guns of Navarone (1961), he had a co-starring role as well as narrating the story. He also appeared in Hancock’s Half Hour on radio in 1958.

He appeared in four films with Navarone co-star Gregory Peck, including Captain Horatio Hornblower (1951), and Moby Dick (1956), in which he played the one-armed sea captain also attacked by the white whale. In the film, Justice's character tries to befriend Captain Ahab (played by Peck), but is amazed and repulsed by Ahab's obsessive pursuit of Moby Dick.

He was under contract to the Rank Organisation and appeared in many of its films. He notably appeared in several movies with Leslie Phillips.

Not long after completing his work for Chitty Chitty Bang Bang in 1968, Justice suffered a severe stroke, which signalled the beginning of the end for his career. However, he nevertheless appeared in a number of films afterwards, albeit in less prominent roles (i.e. playing his best known character, Sir Lancelot Spratt, for the final time in Doctor in Trouble (1970), appearing briefly in several scenes). He suffered a further series of strokes, which left him unable to work.

== Personal life ==
Justice married nurse Dillys Hayden (1914–1984) in Chelsea in 1941. They had a son named James. However, in 1949, he accidentally drowned, aged four, near their watermill home in Whitchurch, Hampshire. After a series of affairs, Justice separated from Hayden. Their marriage was dissolved in 1968.

Justice first met the Baltic German actress Irene von Meyendorff on the set of the 1960 film The Ambassador. They became a couple, marrying three days before he died in 1975.

Justice spoke many languages (possibly up to 20) including English, Spanish, French, Greek, Danish, Russian, Basque, German, Italian, Dutch and Gaelic.

=== Love of Scotland ===
On his return from the war, Justice reinvented himself with stronger Scottish roots. He dispensed with his two middle names taking the new middle name Robertson; out of his habit of wearing Robertson tartan. Justice felt so strongly about his Scottish ancestry, he once claimed to have been born in 1905, under a distillery on the Isle of Skye; sources even listed his birthplace as Wigtown, Wigtownshire. He lived in Wigtown at Orchardton House between 1946 and 1950. He unsuccessfully contested the North Angus and Mearns constituency for the Labour Party in the 1950 general election.

With his £1,500 earnings from the film Doctor in the House (1954), Justice purchased a cottage in the Scottish Highlands village of Spinningdale. In 1966, Justice appeared as a narrator in five episodes of the BBC children's television series Jackanory, telling stories and legends from Scotland, including those of The Battle of the Birds and The Black Bull of Norroway.

== Death ==
After a series of strokes prevented him from working as an actor, Justice was declared bankrupt in 1970. He never recovered from another stroke in 1972. He died in penury, found in his bed in King's Somborne on 2 July 1975 at the age of 68. His ashes were buried on a north Scotland moor near his former residence in the Highland village of Spinningdale.

== Legacy ==
A biography titled James Robertson Justice—What's The Bleeding Time? (referring to a joke in the first Doctor film) was published by Tomahawk Press on 3 March 2008. It was written by James Hogg, Robert Sellers and Howard Watson.

== Filmography ==
- For Those in Peril (1944, first screen appearance) as Operation Room Officer (uncredited)
- Champagne Charlie (1944) as Patron (uncredited)
- Fiddlers Three (1944) as Centurion of the 8th Legion
- Appointment with Crime (1946) as Prison Governor
- Hungry Hill (1947) as Minor Role (uncredited)
- Vice Versa (1948) as Dr. Grimstone
- My Brother Jonathan (1948) as Eugene Dakers
- Against the Wind (1948) as Ackerman
- Quartet (1948) as Branksome (segment "The Facts of Life")
- Scott of the Antarctic (1948) as Taff Evans / P.O. (Taff) Evans, R.N.
- Stop Press Girl (1949) as Arthur Peters
- Poet's Pub (1949) as Prof. Benbow
- Private Angelo (1949) as Feste
- Prelude to Fame (1950) as Sir Arthur Harold
- Christopher Columbus (1949) as Martín Alonso Pinzón
- Whisky Galore! (1949) as Dr. Maclaren
- The Black Rose (1950) as Simeon Beautrie
- My Daughter Joy (1950) as Prof. Keval
- The Magnet (1950) as Tramp (as Seamus Mor Na Feasag)
- Blackmailed (1951) as Mr Sine
- Pool of London (1951) as Engine Room Officer Trotter
- Captain Horatio Hornblower (1951) as Seaman Quist
- David and Bathsheba (1951) as Abishai
- Anne of the Indies (1951) as Red Dougal
- The Lady Says No (1952) as Matthew Huntington Hatch
- The Story of Robin Hood and His Merrie Men (1952) as Little John
- Les Misérables (1952) as Robert
- Miss Robin Hood (1952) as The Macalister
- The Voice of Merrill (1952) as Jonathan Roche
- The Sword and the Rose (1953) as King Henry VIII
- Rob Roy: The Highland Rogue (1954) as John Campbell, Duke of Argyll
- Doctor in the House (1954) as Sir Lancelot Spratt
- Out of the Clouds (1955) as Captain Brent
- Above Us the Waves (1955) as Admiral Ryder
- Land of the Pharaohs (1955) as Vashtar, the Master Architect
- Doctor at Sea (1955) as Captain Hogg
- An Alligator Named Daisy (1955) as Sir James Colebrook
- Storm Over the Nile (1955) as General Burroughs
- Moby Dick (1956) as Captain Boomer
- The Iron Petticoat (1956) as Col. Sklamoff
- Checkpoint (1956) as Warren Ingram
- Doctor at Large (1957) as Sir Lancelot Spratt
- Souvenir d'Italie (1957) (uncredited)
- The Living Idol (1957) as Doctor Alfred Stoner
- Campbell's Kingdom (1957) as James MacDonald
- Seven Thunders (1957) as Dr. Martout
- Thérèse Étienne (1958) as Anton Muller
- Orders to Kill (1958) as Naval Commander
- Upstairs and Downstairs (1959) as Mansfield
- Doctor in Love (1960) as Sir Lancelot Spratt
- A French Mistress (1960) as Robert Martin / 'Bow Wow'
- The Ambassador (1960) as Robert Morrison
- Foxhole in Cairo (1960) as Capt. Robertson
- Very Important Person (1961) as Sir Ernest Pease KBE FRS / Lt. Farrow RNVR
- The Guns of Navarone (1961) as Commodore Jensen / Prologue Narrated by (voice)
- Raising the Wind (1961) as Sir Benjamin Boyd
- Murder, She Said (1961) as Mr Ackenthorpe
- A Pair of Briefs (1962) as Mr Justice Haddon
- Crooks Anonymous (1962) as Sir Harvey Russelrod
- Guns of Darkness (1962) as Hugo Bryant
- Le Repos du guerrier (1962) as Katov - a sculptor
- The Fast Lady (1962) as Charles Chingford
- The Lightship (1963) as Kapitän Freytag
- Mystery Submarine (1963) as RAdm. Rainbird
- Doctor in Distress (1963) as Sir Lancelot Spratt
- Dr. Crippen (1963) as Captain McKenzie
- Father Came Too! (1963) as Sir Beverley Grant
- Up from the Beach (1965) as British beachmaster
- Those Magnificent Men in their Flying Machines (1965) as Narrator (voice)
- You Must Be Joking! (1965) as Librarian
- The Face of Fu Manchu (1965) as Sir Charles
- Doctor in Clover (1966) as Sir Lancelot Spratt
- Long Legs, Long Fingers (1966) as Sir Hammond
- The Trygon Factor (1966) as Sir John (English version, voice)
- Two Weeks in September (1967) as McClintock
- Hell Is Empty (1967) as Angus McGee
- Histoires extraordinaires (1968) as Countess' Adivisor (segment "Metzengerstein")
- Mayerling (1968) as Prince of Wales
- Chitty Chitty Bang Bang (1968) as Lord Scrumptious
- Zeta One (1969) as Maj. Bourdon
- Some Will, Some Won't (1970) as Sir Charles Robson
- Doctor in Trouble (1970) as Sir Lancelot Spratt
- The Massacre of Glencoe (1971) as MacIan (final film role)

Academic offices
Preceded by Sir Sydney A. Smith	Rector of the University of Edinburgh; 1957–1960	Succeeded by Jo Grimond
Preceded by Jo Grimond	Rector of the University of Edinburgh; 1963–1966	Succeeded by Malcolm Muggeridge
