= Doctor in the House (film) =

1954 British film by Ralph Thomas

- Original British cinema poster
- Directed by: Ralph Thomas
- Screenplay by: Richard Gordon; Nicholas Phipps; Ronald Wilkinson
- Based on: Doctor in the House by Richard Gordon
- Produced by: Betty E. Box
- Starring: Dirk Bogarde; Muriel Pavlow; Kenneth More; Donald Sinden; Kay Kendall; James Robertson Justice; Donald Houston
- Cinematography: Ernest Steward
- Edited by: Gerald Thomas
- Music by: Bruce Montgomery
- Production company: Group Film Productions
- Distributed by: General Film Distributors
- Release date: 23 March 1954
- Running time: 87 minutes
- Country: United Kingdom
- Language: English
- Budget: £97,000, £109,000, or £120,000

Doctor in the House is a 1954 British comedy film directed by Ralph Thomas and starring Dirk Bogarde, Kenneth More, Donald Sinden, Donald Houston and James Robertson Justice. It was produced by Betty Box. The screenplay, by Nicholas Phipps, Richard Gordon and Ronald Wilkinson, is based on the 1952 novel Doctor in the House by Gordon, and follows a group of students through medical school.

It was the most popular box office film of 1954 in Great Britain. Its success spawned six sequels, and also television, radio, and audio podcast series titled Doctor in the House.

It made Dirk Bogarde one of the biggest British stars of the 1950s. James Robertson Justice appeared as the irascible chief surgeon Sir Lancelot Spratt, a role he would repeat in many of the sequels.

== Plot summary ==
The story follows the fortunes of Simon Sparrow starting as a new medical student at the fictional St Swithin's Hospital in London. His five years of student life, involving drinking, dating women, and falling foul of the rigid hospital authorities, provide many humorous incidents.

When he has to leave his first choice of lodgings to get away from his landlady's amorous daughter, he ends up with three amiable but less-than-shining fellow students as flatmates, Richard Grimsdyke, Tony Benskin and Taffy Evans. Towering over them all is the short-tempered, demanding chief surgeon, Sir Lancelot Spratt, who strikes terror into everyone.

Simon's friends cajole him into a series of disastrous dates, first with a placidly uninterested "Rigor Mortis", then with Isobel—a woman with very expensive tastes—and finally with Joy, a nurse at St Swithin's. After a rocky start, he finds he likes Joy a great deal. Richard is living on a small but adequate annuity that ends once he graduates, so he deliberately fails his exams every year. However, he is given an ultimatum by his fiancée Stella: graduate or she will leave him. He buckles down.

The climax of the film is a rugby match with a rival medical school during Simon's fifth and final year. After St Swithin's wins, the other side tries to steal the school mascot, a stuffed gorilla, resulting in a riot and car chase through the streets of London. Simon and his friends are almost expelled for their part in this by the humourless Dean of St Swithin's. When Simon helps Joy sneak into the nurses' residence after curfew, he accidentally falls through a skylight. This second incident gets him expelled, even though he is a short time away from completing his finals. Sir Lancelot, however, has fond memories of his own student days, particularly of the Dean's own youthful indiscretion (persuading a nurse to re-enact Lady Godiva's ride). His discreet blackmail gets Simon reinstated. In the end, Richard fails (as does Tony), but Stella decides to enrol at St Swithin's herself so there will be at least one doctor in the family. Simon and Taffy graduate.

== Cast ==
- Dirk Bogarde as Simon Sparrow
- Muriel Pavlow as Joy Gibson
- Kenneth More as Richard Grimsdyke
- Donald Sinden as Tony Benskin
- Kay Kendall as Isobel Minster
- James Robertson Justice as Sir Lancelot Spratt
- Donald Houston as Taffy Evans
- Suzanne Cloutier as Stella
- George Coulouris as Briggs
- Nicholas Phipps as magistrate
- Geoffrey Keen as Dean
- Martin Boddey as demonstrator at pedal machine
- Joan Sims as "Rigor Mortis"
- Gudrun Ure as May
- Harry Locke as Jessup
- Cyril Chamberlain as policeman
- Ernest Clark as Mr Parrish
- Maureen Pryor as Mrs Cooper
- George Benson as lecturer on drains
- Shirley Eaton as Milly Groaker
- Eliot Makeham as examiner
- Noel Purcell as Padre (pub landlord)
- Joan Hickson as Mrs Groaker
- Brian Oulton as medical equipment salesman
- Mark Dignam as examiner at microscope
- Felix Felton as examiner
- Lisa Gastoni as Jane
- Geoffrey Sumner as forensic lecturer
- Amy Veness as Grandma Cooper
- Mona Washbourne as midwifery sister

== Production ==
=== Development ===
Producer Betty Box picked up a copy of the book at Crewe during a long rail journey and saw its possibility as a film. The film rights had been optioned to Associated British Picture Corporation (ABPC) but they decided not to make the movie, and Box bought the rights.

She and Ralph Thomas had a job convincing the Rank Organisation to make the movie because of the lack of a central story. But Box said "I think I know how to do it. I take my four students through three or four years of medical training and make that the story."

She later said she was "very lucky" to get Nicholas Phipps to write the script. "There wasn't a great deal of the book in it, except for the characters", she said.

"I'd never made comedies before but I reckoned I wanted to make it both real and funny and so I wouldn't deal with comedians."

Rank executives thought that people would not be interested in a film about medicine, and that Bogarde, who up to then had played spivs and Second World War heroes, could not play light comedy. As a result, the filmmakers got a low budget and were only allowed to use available Rank contract artists.

"They didn't really have any funny actors to work with; they were all straight actors. Dirk Bogarde... had never played a funny line in his life", said Thomas.

Thomas said "we decided we didn’t want to use actors who were professional funny men. We would cast the best actors we could get, actors we'd have cast if it was going to be a straight dramatic story about medicine. So we cast Dirk, Kenneth More, Kay Kendall, people who were bright, ‘hot’ and good."

Borgarde claimed he "changed my character’s name to Simon Sparrow because I thought it was funnier, and so it stayed. The one stipulation I made was that I had to be a real doctor; I would do things that were funny, but would never instigate anything funny."

Kenneth More had just made Genevieve (1953) when he signed to appear in the cast, but Genevieve had not been released yet. Accordingly, his fee was only £3,500. Robert Morley was approached to play the surgeon but his agent insisted on a fee of £15,000 so they cast James Robertson Justice instead at a fee of £1,500.

Donald Sinden was under contract to Rank.

=== Shooting ===
Filming started in September 1953.

"Not one of them ever did anything because they wanted to make it funny", Thomas added. "They played it within a very strict, tight limit of believability. Dirk was able to do that, he got away with it and it stopped him from being just another bright, good looking leading man and made him a star."

St Swithin's Hospital is represented by the front of University College London, and is thought to be based upon Barts and The London School of Medicine and Dentistry, the medical school attached to St Bartholomew's Hospital, where Richard Gordon was a student.

Bogarde recalled " We had two doctors always on the set; if any of us had to perform an operation or some medical procedure, there was always someone there to explain exactly how to do it. | wouldn’t put a stethoscope to a body until I knew exactly how it was done and what I would have said. It was very strictly controlled. It was an enormously happy film to make. There wasn’t a bad-tempered face on the set."

Sinden said "Ralph had a great sense of humour and an ability to get on very well with his cast. There was a great enjoyment in being on the set with him, for, say, Doctor in the House, every day. You looked forward to going in each morning. We were always encouraged to enjoy ourselves."

== Reception ==
=== Box office ===
The film was a success at the box office. Betty Box estimated it recouped its budget in the first six weeks of release. Thomas says it paid for itself in two weeks and claims it was the first "purely British picture without any foreign involvement to make a million pounds' profit within two years". It became the most successful film in Rank's history and had admissions of 15,500,000 – one third of the British population. The movie turned Bogarde, More, Kendall and Sinden into stars.

Thomas put its success down to the fact that "it was about something which, until that time, had been treated with about as much reverence as you would treat your confessor. People used to hold medicine in great awe ... In our film, people liked and identified with the funny situations they had seen happen or which had happened to themselves as patients, doctors or nurses."

The movie was reissued on a double bill with Geneveive that was called "the greatest reissue double bill of all time."

=== Critical ===
The Monthly Film Bulletin wrote: "Doctor in the House ... works its way with determined high spirits through the repertoire of medical student jokes. The jerky, hit-or-miss narrative style (the film resolves itself in effect into a series of anecdotes), keeps the action moving at a fair pace, and, although much of the humour is obvious and repetitious, Kenneth More, as the resourceful Grimsdyke, has some very amusing moments. The other players – notably James Robertson Justice as the surgeon and Geoffrey Keen as the dean – for the most part efficiently present familiar"

British film critic Leslie Halliwell said: "The original is not bad, as the students, though plainly over age, constitute a formidable mass of British talent at its peak."

The Radio Times Guide to Films gave the film 4/5 stars, writing: "This film launched the popular St Swithin's series and made a matinée idol out of Dirk Bogarde. Following a class of students through their training, it delights in the dark side of hospital humour, with the medical misadventures providing much better entertainment than the romantic interludes. Kenneth More, Donald Sinden and Donald Houston are on top form as the duffers doing retakes, while Bogarde oozes charm and quiet comic flair. But stealing all their thunder is James Robertson-Justice as Sir Lancelot Spratt. Followed by Doctor at Sea and Doctor at Large."

Variety noted: "A topdraw British comedy ... bright, diverting entertainment, intelligently scripted ... and warmly played."

TV Guide wrote: "Shot with the appropriate lighthearted touch in bright, shiny color, with fine performances all around (Kenneth More is particularly good), this sometimes hilarious film started the series off on a high note." Filmink argued "the film benefited greatly from luck – right subject, story, writer (Nicholas Phipps), cast, producer-director, release date – but luck is preparation meets opportunity, and Rank deserves credit for giving the filmmakers the opportunity."

Thomas reflected "It was less quaint and more realistic than the Ealing films which I adored, but it didn’t have any sort of whimsy at all. You laugh because you are involved in and amused at the situations, rather than at big payoff gags. The 'Carry On’ films... were immensely funny farces constructed to have as many laughs as possible within their ninety minutes of screen time. They were not stories; they used comics, and were like seaside picture postcards or old variety turns. Doctor in the House was between the two, because it was a realistic picture which set a new trend in this sort of comedy."

== Awards ==
At the 1955 BAFTA awards:

- Kenneth More won Best British Actor.
- The film was nominated for Best British Film and Best Film from any Source.
- Nicholas Phipps was nominated for Best British Screenplay.

== Sequels ==
Doctor in the House was the most popular film at the British box office in 1954. Its success resulted in six sequels, three starring Bogarde, one with Michael Craig and Leslie Phillips, and the other two with Phillips, as well as a successful television series from London Weekend Television.

== Notes ==
- McFarlane, Brian (1992). Sixty voices : celebrities recall the golden age of British cinema. London: BFI.
