= Ernest Steward =

British cinematographer

Ernest Steward BSC (11 September 1910 or 8 January 1914 – 8 April 1990) was a British cinematographer.

Born in London, England, he began his career – as with most cinematographers of his era – as a camera operator. His early credits in this field included Great Expectations (1946) and London Belongs to Me (1948).

As Director of Photography, he filmed mostly light-hearted comedies. He made several for producer Betty Box, including the Doctor films, based on the books by Richard Gordon, A Tale of Two Cities (1958) and The 39 Steps (1959). He was cinematographer for the Carry On comedy series, beginning with Carry On Up the Khyber in 1968, eventually alternating with Alan Hume as regular DoP. Between 1950 and 1971 he was the cinematographer on practically all the films directed by Ralph Thomas, a total of 32 productions, and others, too, such as House of Mystery (1961), and Seven Keys (1962).

Steward also worked on TV, on such series as The Human Jungle, The Avengers, The New Avengers and The Professionals.
