= 1964 in literature =

This article contains information about the literary events and publications of 1964.

== Events ==
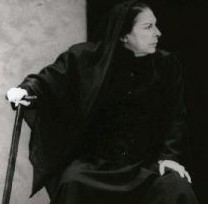
Minerva Mena in The House of Bernarda Alba

- January 10 – Federico García Lorca's play The House of Bernarda Alba, completed just before his assassination in 1936, receives its first performance in Spain.
- January 12 – The Royal Shakespeare Company Experimental Group open a four-week Theatre of Cruelty season at the LAMDA Theatre Club, London.
- January 23 – Arthur Miller's play After the Fall opens at the ANTA Washington Square Theatre Off-Broadway in New York City, directed by Elia Kazan and starring Jason Robards and Kazan's wife Barbara Loden. A semi-autobiographical work, it arouses controversy over Miller's portrayal of his late ex-wife Marilyn Monroe.
- February 11 – A London retailer, in the case of R. v. Gold, is found guilty under section 3 of the Obscene Publications Act 1959 of stocking a 1963 edition of John Cleland's novel Fanny Hill (Memoirs of a Woman of Pleasure, 1748–1749).
- February 28 – The Dutch comic artist and writer Jan Cremer publishes his autobiographical novel I, Jan Cremer, which provokes controversy for its frank content and style and becomes a bestseller.
- April 23 – Shakespeare Birthplace Trust opens the Shakespeare Centre in Stratford-upon-Avon, England, to house its library and research facilities.
- April 29 – Peter Weiss's play with music Die Verfolgung und Ermordung Jean Paul Marats dargestellt durch die Schauspielgruppe des Hospizes zu Charenton unter Anleitung des Herrn de Sade (The Persecution and Assassination of Jean-Paul Marat as Performed by the Inmates of the Asylum of Charenton Under the Direction of the Marquis de Sade, known as Marat/Sade) premières at the Schiller Theater in West Berlin. In August it receives its English-language première by the Royal Shakespeare Company in London at the Aldwych Theatre.
- May – Michael Moorcock becomes editor of the science fiction magazine New Worlds.
- May 5 – W. H. Auden's preface to the anthology The Protestant Mystics describes the supernatural "Vision of Agape" he experienced in June 1933.
- May 6 – Joe Orton's black comedy Entertaining Mr Sloane premières at the New Arts Theatre in London with Dudley Sutton in the title rôle.
- May 29 – Le Théâtre du Soleil is established as a collective avant-garde stage ensemble by Ariane Mnouchkine, Philippe Léotard and fellow students of L'École Internationale de Théâtre Jacques Lecoq in Paris. It opens with Les Petits Bourgeois (adapted from Maxim Gorky's Мещане), at Théâtre Mouffetard.
- June 22 – Henry Miller's Tropic of Cancer is allowed to circulate legally in the United States by the U.S. Supreme Court three decades after its publication in France, after the U.S. Supreme Court, in Grove Press, Inc. v. Gerstein, cites Jacobellis v. Ohio (decided the same day) and overrules state court findings that the book is obscene.
- August 11 – Ian Fleming walks to the Royal St George's Golf Club near Sandwich, Kent, for lunch with friends, collapsing shortly afterward with a heart attack. His last recorded words are an apology to the ambulance drivers: "I am sorry to trouble you chaps. I don't know how you get along so fast with the traffic on the roads these days." Fleming dies next day.
- September – The Everyman Theatre opens in Liverpool, England.
- September 28 – Brian Friel's play Philadelphia, Here I Come! is premièred at the Gaiety Theatre, Dublin.
- October 22 – French author Jean Paul Sartre declines the Nobel Prize in Literature for literary and political reasons, explaining his belief that an author must not accept official awards from any institution.
- October 28 – The Wednesday Play is broadcast for the first time on BBC1 television, presenting original one-off contemporary social drama, mostly written for television.

== New books ==
=== Fiction ===
- Chinua Achebe – Arrow of God
- José Agustín – La Tumba
- Eric Ambler – A Kind of Anger
- Poul Anderson – Time and Stars
- Louis Auchincloss – The Rector of Justin
- J. G. Ballard – The Terminal Beach
- Simone de Beauvoir – A Very Easy Death (Une Mort très douce)
- Saul Bellow – Herzog
- Thomas Berger – Little Big Man
- Elizabeth Bowen – The Little Girls
- Leigh Brackett
  - People of the Talisman
  - The Secret of Sinharat
- Ray Bradbury – The Machineries of Joy
- John Braine – The Jealous God
- Richard Brautigan – A Confederate General From Big Sur
- John Brunner
  - To Conquer Chaos
  - The Whole Man
- Edgar Rice Burroughs – Tarzan and the Madman
- William S. Burroughs – Nova Express
- J. Ramsey Campbell – The Inhabitant of the Lake and Less Welcome Tenants
- Victor Canning – The Scorpio Letters
- John Dickson Carr – Most Secret
- Agatha Christie – A Caribbean Mystery
- Louis-Ferdinand Céline – London Bridge: Guignol's Band II
- A. J. Cronin – A Song of Sixpence
- Cecil Day-Lewis – The Sad Variety
- Len Deighton – Funeral in Berlin
- R. F. Delderfield – Too Few For Drums
- August Derleth (editor) – Over the Edge
- Michel Droit – Le Retour
- Ralph Ellison – Shadow and Act
- Ian Fleming – You Only Live Twice
- Max Frisch – Gantenbein
- Daniel F. Galouye – Simulacron-3 (Counterfeit World)
- William Golding – The Spire
- Richard Gordon – Nuts in May
- L. P. Hartley – The Brickfield
- Hartley Howard – Department K
- Bohumil Hrabal – Dancing Lessons for the Advanced in Age (Taneční hodiny pro starší a pokročilé)
- Carl Jacobi – Portraits in Moonlight
- B. S. Johnson – Albert Angelo
- Ken Kesey – Sometimes a Great Notion
- Richard E. Kim – The Martyred
- James Leasor – Passport to Oblivion
- Etienne Leroux – Een vir Azazel (One for Azazel, translated as One for the Devil)
- Liang Yusheng (梁羽生) – Datang Youxia Zhuan (大唐游俠傳)
- Clarice Lispector – The Passion According to G.H. (A paixão segundo G.H.)
- H. P. Lovecraft – At the Mountains of Madness and Other Novels
- John D. MacDonald
  - The Deep Blue Good-by
  - A Purple Place For Dying
  - The Quick Red Fox
- Ngaio Marsh – Dead Water
- James Mayo – Hammerhead
- Gladys Mitchell – Death of a Delft Blue
- Iris Murdoch – The Italian Girl
- Sterling North – Rascal
- Vladimir Nabokov – The Defense
- Ngũgĩ wa Thiong'o (also known as James Ngigi) – Weep Not, Child
- Kenzaburō Ōe (大江 健三郎) – A Personal Matter (個人的な体験; Kojinteki na taiken)
- Anthony Powell – The Valley of Bones
- Mario Puzo – Fortunate Pilgrim
- Ellery Queen – And On the Eighth Day
- Jean Ray – Saint-Judas-de-la-nuit
- Ruth Rendell – From Doon With Death
- Karl Ristikivi – Imede saar
- Hubert Selby Jr. – Last Exit to Brooklyn
- Ryōtarō Shiba (司馬 遼太郎) – Moeyo Ken (燃えよ剣, Burn, O Sword)
- Howard Spring – Winds of the Day
- Clark Ashton Smith – Tales of Science and Sorcery
- Wilbur Smith – When the Lion Feeds
- Rex Stout
  - Trio for Blunt Instruments
  - A Right to Die
- Julian Symons – The End of Solomon Grundy
- Jim Thompson – Pop. 1280
- Leon Uris – Armageddon
- Jack Vance
  - The Houses of Iszm
  - The Killing Machine
  - Star King
- Gore Vidal – Julian
- Irving Wallace – The Man
- Raymond Williams – Second Generation
- Maia Wojciechowska – Shadow of a Bull

=== Children and young people ===
- Lloyd Alexander – The Book of Three
- Rev. W. Awdry – Mountain Engines (nineteenth in The Railway Series of 42 books by him and his son Christopher Awdry)
- Nina Bawden – On the Run (also Three on the Run)
- Christianna Brand – Nurse Matilda
- Hesba Fay Brinsmead – Pastures of the Blue Crane
- Jeff Brown – Flat Stanley
- Roald Dahl – Charlie and the Chocolate Factory
- Louise Fitzhugh – Harriet the Spy
- Ian Fleming – Chitty-Chitty-Bang-Bang: The Magical Car
- Rumer Godden – Home is the Sailor
- Irene Hunt – Across Five Aprils
- Ervin Lázár – A kisfiú meg az oroszlánok (The Little Boy and the Lions)
- Rhoda Levine – Harrison Loved His Umbrella
- Ruth Manning-Sanders – A Book of Dwarfs
- J. P. Martin – Uncle (first in a series of six books)
- Jean Merrill – The Pushcart War
- Ruth Park – The Muddle-Headed Wombat on Holiday
- Bill Peet
  - Ella
  - Randy's Dandy Lions
- Shel Silverstein – The Giving Tree
- Miriam Young – Miss Suzy

=== Drama ===
- Ama Ata Aidoo – The Dilemma of a Ghost
- David Campton – Dead and Alive
- William Douglas Home – The Reluctant Peer
- Brian Friel – Philadelphia Here I Come!
- Girish Karnad – Tughlaq
- Robert Lowell – The Old Glory
- Arthur Miller
  - After the Fall
  - Incident At Vichy
- Joe Orton – Entertaining Mr Sloane
- Alexander Vampilov – Farewell in June
- Peter Weiss – Marat/Sade

=== Poetry ===
- Joseph Payne Brennan – Nightmare Need
- Leonard Cohen – Flowers for Hitler
- Mehr Lal Soni Zia Fatehabadi – Husn-e-Ghazal (The Beauty of Ghazal)
- Philip Larkin – The Whitsun Weddings
- Oodgeroo Noonuccal – We are Going: Poems
- Ion Vinea – Ora fântânilor (The Hour of Fountains)
- Donald Wandrei – Poems for Midnight
- Up The Line To Death: The War Poets 1914-1918 (anthology)

=== Non-fiction ===
- Nelson Algren – Conversations with Nelson Algren (interviews by H. E. F. Donohue)
- Eric Berne – Games People Play
- Allan Bloom with Harry V. Jaffa – Shakespeare's Politics
- L. Sprague de Camp
  - Ancient Ruins and Archaeology (with Catherine Crook de Camp)
  - Elephant
- Hilda Ellis Davidson – Gods and Myths of Northern Europe
- Aileen Fox – South West England (Ancient peoples and places series)
- Dick Gregory – Nigger: An Autobiography
- Ernest Hemingway – A Moveable Feast
- Michael Holroyd – Hugh Kingsmill: A Critical Biography
- John F. Kennedy (k. 1963) – A Nation of Immigrants
- Martin Luther King Jr. – Why We Can't Wait
- Jan Kott – Shakespeare, Our Contemporary
- Violette Leduc – La Bâtarde
- Mao Zedong – Quotations from Chairman Mao Tse-tung (毛主席语录, Máo Zhǔxí Yǔlù)
- Herbert Marcuse – One-Dimensional Man
- Marshall McLuhan – Understanding Media: The Extensions of Man
- Jürgen Moltmann – Theology of Hope (Theologie der Hoffnung)
- V. S. Naipaul – An Area of Darkness
- Sayyid Qutb – Ma'alim fi al-Tariq (معالم في الطريق, Milestones)
- Ayn Rand – The Virtue of Selfishness
- The Warren Commission – The Warren Report
- Evelyn Waugh – A Little Learning

== Births ==
- January 26 – Peter Braunstein, American journalist and playwright
- February 23 – Joseph O'Neill, Irish-born writer
- March 7 – Bret Easton Ellis, American novelist, screenwriter and short-story writer
- March 21 – Kaori Ekuni (江國 香織), Japanese novelist
- April 9 – Margaret Peterson Haddix, American children's author
- June 5 – Rick Riordan, American young-adult author
- June 7 – Petr Hruška, Czech poet
- June 11 – Dan Chaon, American novelist and short-story writer
- June 22 – Dan Brown, American novelist and mystery writer
- June 26 – Conor Kostick, Irish historian and children's author
- July 3 – Joanne Harris, English novelist
- July 7 – Karina Galvez, Ecuadorian poet
- July 16 – Anne Provoost, Flemish novelist and essayist
- August 22 – Diane Setterfield, British author
- September 9 – Aleksandar Hemon, Bosnian novelist and short-story writer
- September 19
  - Patrick Marber, English comedian, playwright, director, puppeteer, actor and screenwriter
  - Yvonne Vera, Zimbabwean novelist (died 2005)
- September 25
  - Carlos Ruiz Zafón, Spanish novelist (died 2020)
  - Gareth Thompson, English children's author
- December 12 – J. R. Moehringer, American journalist and ghostwriter
- December 26 – Elizabeth Kostova, American author
- December 29 – Christine Leunens, American-born Belgian-New Zealand novelist
- unknown dates
  - Ros Barber, English novelist and poet
  - Ge Fei (格非, real name: Liu Yong, 刘勇), Chinese novelist
  - Mai Jia (real name: Jiǎng Běnhǔ, 蒋本浒), Chinese novelist
  - Nell Zink, American novelist

== Deaths ==
- January 17 – T. H. White, English novelist (heart condition, born 1906)
- February 1 – Sigge Stark (Signe Björnberg), Swedish writer (born 1896)
- February 3 – Clarence Irving Lewis, American philosopher (born 1883)
- February 15 – Reginald Garrigou-Lagrange, French theologian (born 1877)
- February 25 – Grace Metalious (Marie Grace DeRepentigny), American novelist (cirrhosis of liver, born 1924)
- March 1 – Davíð Stefánsson, Icelandic poet (born 1895)
- March 17 – Păstorel Teodoreanu, Romanian poet and satirist (lung cancer, born 1894)
- March 20 – Brendan Behan, Irish playwright, poet and writer (born 1923)
- March 30 – Nella Larsen, American novelist (born 1891)
- April 9 – Mihu Dragomir, Romanian poet, journalist and short story writer (heart attack, born 1919)
- April 14 – Rachel Carson, American environmentalist (breast cancer, born 1907)
- April 18 – Ben Hecht, American screenwriter (born 1894)
- April 23 – Karl Polanyi (Károly Polányi), Austro-Hungarian economic historian and social philosopher (born 1886)
- April 26 – E. J. Pratt, Canadian poet (born 1882)
- May 13 – Hamilton Basso, American novelist and journalist (born 1904)
- July 6 – Ion Vinea, Romanian poet, novelist, and journalist (cancer, born 1895)
- July 29 – Wanda Wasilewska, Polish Soviet novelist and journalist (heart disease, born 1905)
- August 3 – Flannery O'Connor, American essayist and fiction writer (born 1925)
- August 5 – Moa Martinson, Swedish author (born 1890)
- August 12 – Ian Fleming, English spy thriller writer (heart attack, born 1908)
- August 17 – Mihai Ralea, Romanian critic and sociologist of literature (born 1896)
- September 5 – Angel Cruchaga Santa María, Chilean writer (born 1893)
- September 6 – San Tiago Dantas, Brazilian journalist (born 1911)
- September 14 – Vasily Grossman, Soviet novelist (cancer, born 1905)
- September 18 – Seán O'Casey, Irish dramatist and memoirist (born 1880)
- October 26 – Agnes Miegel, German author, journalist and poet (born 1879)
- c. November – Radu D. Rosetti, Romanian poet and playwright (born 1874)
- November 13 – Hadley Waters, American playwright (complications from a fall, born 1896)
- November 21 – Leah Bodine Drake, American poet, editor and critic (cancer, born 1914)
- November 29 – Anne de Vries, Dutch novelist (born 1904)
- December 9 – Dame Edith Sitwell, English poet and critic (born 1887)
- December 21 – Carl Van Vechten, American writer and photographer (born 1880)

== Awards ==
- Nobel Prize in Literature – Jean-Paul Sartre (refused)

=== Canada ===
- See 1964 Governor General's Awards for a complete list of winners and finalists for those awards.

=== France ===
- Prix Goncourt: Georges Conchon, L'Etat sauvage
- Prix Médicis: Monique Wittig, L’Opoponax

=== United Kingdom ===
- Carnegie Medal for children's literature: Sheena Porter, Nordy Bank
- Eric Gregory Award: Robert Nye, Ken Smith, Jean Symons, Ted Walker
- James Tait Black Memorial Prize for fiction: Frank Tuohy, The Ice Saints
- James Tait Black Memorial Prize for biography: Elizabeth Longford, Victoria R.I.
- Queen's Gold Medal for Poetry: R. S. Thomas

=== United States ===
- American Academy of Arts and Letters Gold Medal for Drama: Lillian Hellman
- Hugo Award: Clifford D. Simak, Way Station
- Newbery Medal for children's literature: Emily Cheney Neville, It's Like This, Cat
- Pulitzer Prize for Drama: no award given
- Pulitzer Prize for Fiction: no award given
- Pulitzer Prize for Poetry: Louis Simpson: At The End Of The Open Road

=== Elsewhere ===
- Friedenspreis des Deutschen Buchhandels: Gabriel Marcel
- Miles Franklin Award: George Johnston, My Brother Jack
- Premio Nadal: Alfredo Martínez Garrido, El miedo y la esperanza
- Viareggio Prize: Giuseppe Berto, Il male oscuro

== Notes ==
- Hahn, Daniel (2015). The Oxford Companion to Children's Literature (2nd ed.). Oxford. University Press. ISBN 9780198715542.
