= The Captain's Table =

1959 British film by Jack Lee

The Captain's Table (1959)
- Directed by: Jack Lee
- Written by: Bryan Forbes; Jack Whiting; Nicholas Phipps
- Based on: The Captain's Table by Richard Gordon
- Produced by: Joseph Janni
- Starring: John Gregson; Donald Sinden; Peggy Cummins; Nadia Gray; Maurice Denham
- Cinematography: Christopher Challis
- Edited by: Frederick Wilson
- Music by: Frank Cordell
- Production company: Rank Organisation
- Distributed by: Rank Film Distributors
- Release date: 6 January 1959
- Running time: 90 minutes
- Country: United Kingdom
- Language: English

The Captain's Table is a 1959 British comedy film directed by Jack Lee and starring John Gregson, Donald Sinden, Peggy Cummins and Nadia Gray. The film is based on the 1954 novel of the same title by Richard Gordon, later adapted into the 1971 German film The Captain starring Heinz Rühmann.

== Plot ==
After serving all his working life with the South Star line, exclusively in cargo ships, Captain Albert Ebbs meets his employer and is finally given command (albeit temporarily) of the SS Queen Adelaide, an ocean liner sailing from London to Sydney. An excellent seaman, he finds that he now has many social obligations that he does not have the skills to fulfil. He must preside at the captain's table, host cocktail parties, judge beauty contests and dance with the lady passengers. He must also cope with amorous widows, young couples who want him to marry them and a blustering ex-army major who claims to have the ear of the chairman of the shipping line.

To add to his woes, most of the officers and crew, led by the chief purser, are on the fiddle. The captain does not fully realise this until the last night of the voyage, when champagne being served is revealed to be cider, with the crew pocketing the considerable profits.

All comes out well – just. The captain finds himself engaged to be married to an attractive widow, the chief officer is also engaged to a young heiress, and the larcenous officers are arrested by Sydney police.

== Cast ==
- John Gregson as Captain Ebbs
- Peggy Cummins as Mrs Judd
- Donald Sinden as Chief Officer Shawe-Wilson
- Nadia Gray as Mrs Porteous
- Maurice Denham as Major Broster
- Richard Wattis as Chief Purser Prittlewell
- Reginald Beckwith as Captain's Steward Burtweed
- Lionel Murton as Bernie Floate
- Bill Kerr as Bill Coke
- Nicholas Phipps as Reddish
- Joan Sims as Maude Pritchett
- Miles Malleson as Canon Swingler
- John Le Mesurier as Sir Angus
- James Hayter as Chief Engineer Earnshaw
- June Jago as Gwenny Coke
- Oliver Reed as minor role
- Arthur Lowe as minor role

== Production ==
The film was based on a 1954 novel by Richard Gordon, who had written Doctor in the House and its sequels which had been successfully filmed by the Rank Organisation. Since the regular "doctor" filmmakers, Ralph Thomas and Betty Box, were busy on other projects, the film was made by producer Jack Janni and director Jack Lee who had made A Town Like Alice (1956) and Robbery Under Arms (1957). Jack Lee later recalled:

I thought I'd like to make a comedy, although I didn’t know anything about comedy. I said, “All we need are funny scenes, funny lines, actors who can pull faces, and that’s it’. Joe got a lot of marvellous people writing for it – Bryan Forbes, Nicholas Phipps and John Whiting – and they wouldn’t let me near the script. I liked Nadia Gray very much indeed. She brought a very different quality to the film, living as she did in Paris. Donald Sinden was very good too; it was a fairly conventional part for him, but when I saw the film again recently I was surprised at just how good he was. And we had some good old ham actors in it, like Reginald Beckwith, camping away like mad.

Dirk Bogarde had been preparing a film about Lawrence of Arabia written by Terence Rattigan and directed by Anthony Asquith which was cancelled by Rank in February 1959 shortly before shooting was to begin. Rank offered no explanation but head of production Earl St John offered the lead in The Captain's Table as compensation. Bogarde turned it down and John Gregson played the lead instead.

During filming Lee said "My greatest help is the cast itself. They are all known quantities, experienced and expert. I think I would refuse to make a comedy with an unknown cast. With the aid of the director and the editor's scissors, inexperienced actors might get away with it in drama but never in comedy. Here the actor's performance has the last word.”

Donald Sinden says Joseph Janni told him the film would involve three months' filming around the Greek Islands so the actor agreed to make it. Then this was changed to filming around the Channel Islands, then changed again to the Tilbury Docks. "So for three months we stayed in Southend and commuted to the Docks where myriad arc lamps simulated the Mediterranean sun while the girls tried to hide their goose pimples," wrote Sinden.

Filming started on 21 July 1958. Location shooting took place at Tilbury Docks and involved the Orient Line's SS Orsova, with a fake "Queen Adelaide" nameplate covering her real name. Some scenes were shot on the Orsova's decks, including the Bathing Beauty contest in the ship's stadium with presumably real ship's officers looking on from the bridge front windows. All interiors and some deck scenes were Pinewood Studios creations, not necessarily accurate reproductions of Orsova's real interior.

Michael Blakemore has a small part.

== Reception ==
=== Box office ===
According to Kinematograph Weekly the film performed "better than average" at the British box office in 1959. Variety confirmed this.

=== Critical ===
The Monthly Film Bulletin wrote: "Except for a homosexual steward, played with relish by Reginald Beckwith, this mechanical farce relies entirely on stock characters and situations of depressing banality. John Gregson wades through his material, including a prolonged slapstick sequence, with commendable fortitude, and the rest of the players do all that is required of them."

Variety called it "somewhat scrappy but amusingly lighthearted".

Filmink called it "a pleasant, fun, breezy movie; it was a hit, too."

In British Sound Films: The Studio Years 1928–1959 David Quinlan rated the film as "mediocre", writing: "Episodic farce, some way behind Doctor at Sea."
