= Doctor at Large =

Doctor at Large may refer to:

- Doctor at Large (novel), a 1955 novel by Richard Gordon
- Doctor at Large (film), a 1957 British comedy film
- Doctor at Large (TV series), a 1971 British television comedy series based on a set of books by Richard Gordon
- "Doctor at Large" (Doctors), a 2004 television episode
