= Doctor in Clover =

1966 British film by Ralph Thomas

- Original British 1966 quad film poster
- Directed by: Ralph Thomas
- Screenplay by: Jack Davies
- Based on: Doctor in Clover by Richard Gordon
- Produced by: Betty E. Box
- Starring: Leslie Phillips; James Robertson Justice; Shirley Anne Field; John Fraser; Joan Sims; Arthur Haynes
- Cinematography: Ernest Steward
- Edited by: Alfred Roome
- Music by: John Scott
- Production company: Rank Organisation
- Distributed by: Rank Film Distributors
- Release date: 4 March 1966
- Running time: 101 minutes
- Country: United Kingdom
- Language: English

Doctor in Clover (U.S. title: Carnaby, M.D.) is a 1966 British comedy film directed by Ralph Thomas and starring Leslie Phillips, James Robertson Justice, Shirley Anne Field, John Fraser, Joan Sims, and Arthur Haynes. The film is based on the 1960 novel of the same title by Richard Gordon. It is the sixth of the seven films in the Doctor series.

British singer Kiki Dee sang the film's title track.

== Plot ==
The film is based at the (fictitious) St Swithin's Hospital, where Dr Gaston Grimsdyke, an accident-prone doctor and cad, is more interested in the nurses than the patients.

Having been sacked from his job as a medical officer at a men's prison for misbehaviour with the Governor's daughter, Grimsdyke is taken on by his old medical tutor Sir Lancelot Spratt, who is determined to make him a successful surgeon.

Grimsdyke discovers that a plum senior medical post is shortly to become vacant, and starts scheming to be considered, even after his cousin Miles tells him that he has already been unofficially offered the job.

Spratt and the newly-appointed hospital matron clash, leading Spratt to order Grimsdyke to romance her and 'soften her up'. But she misinterprets his 'anonymous' overtures, and comes to believe that Spratt is her secret admirer, leading to various complications.

Grimsdyke has already fallen in love with the much younger physiotherapist Jeanine, but she considers him to be too old for her. Grimsdyke tries various methods to make himself look younger and more appealing to Jeanine, but without success. Eventually, he declares his love to her, but she replies that he is very sweet but she has just become engaged to be married to Lambert Symington, whom Grimsdyke had tried to convince that she had no feelings for him.

A 'rejuvenation serum', which Grimsdyke had intended for himself, is accidentally injected into Sir Lancelot. Then Spratt encourages Grimsdyke to release an 'experimental' mood-enhancing gas at a hospital dance they will be attending. The combination of the two substances causes Spratt to run amok at the party and he ends up romancing the matron. But next day, she tells him she is married to her career and must disappoint him, and she resigns to take up a post elsewhere.

When Grimsdyke is told the senior medical post has gone to his cousin, and that he was not successful partly because he was considered to be too young-looking, this lifts his mood. The new matron turns out to be equally opposed to Spratt's ideas of how the hospital should be run, so he again asks for Grimsdyke's intervention, which this time he is happy to do.

== Main cast ==
- Leslie Phillips as Dr Gaston Grimsdyke
- James Robertson Justice as Sir Lancelot Spratt
- Shirley Anne Field as Nurse Bancroft
- John Fraser as Dr Miles Grimsdyke
- Joan Sims as Matron Sweet
- Arthur Haynes as Tarquin Wendover
- Fenella Fielding as Tatiana Rubikov
- Jeremy Lloyd as Lambert Symington
- Noel Purcell as O'Malley
- Robert Hutton as Rock Stewart
- Eric Barker as Professor Halfbeck
- Terry Scott as Robert the hairdresser
- Norman Vaughan as Godfrey, TV commentator
- Elizabeth Ercy as Jeannine Belmond
- Alfie Bass as Fleming
- Jean Benedetti as Paston
- Anne Cunningham as Women's Ward Sister
- Suzan Farmer as Nurse Holliday
- Harry Fowler as Grafton
- Peter Gilmore as Len (choreographer)
- Nicky Henson as Carnaby Street sales assistant
- Robin Hunter as Sydney (ballet dancer)
- Barry Justice as Beckwith
- Bill Kerr as Digger (ballet dancer)
- Justine Lord as new matron
- Roddy Maude-Roxby as Tristram
- Lionel Murton as film studio man
- Dandy Nichols as patient with kidney stones
- Anthony Sharp as the Dean
- Ronnie Stevens as TV producer
- Alexandra Bastedo as nurse dancing with Sir Lancelot (uncredited)
- Norman Chappell as man delivering flowers (uncredited)
- Catherine Feller as Catherine in French film (uncredited)
- Danny Green as Ashby (uncredited)
- John Junkin as prison warder (uncredited)
- Harold Kasket as husband in French film (uncredited)
- André Maranne as Pierre in French film (uncredited)
- Wendy Richard as nurse with false eyelashes (uncredited)
- Jack Smethurst as long-haired patient (uncredited)

== Production ==
The novel Doctor in Clover was published in 1960. Film rights were bought by the Rank Organisation, whose head of production Earl St John announced the film for production in 1961. However, it took a number of years for the film to be made. The film was formally announced in 1964, one of a series of comedies that Rank were making at the time (others including Carry On Cleo and That Riviera Touch).

The film was shot in Carnaby Street, Wormwood Scrubs and Pinewood Studios.

The opening credits include the following acknowledgement: We are grateful for the help and facilities given at Wexham Park Hospital by the staff of the Hospital, Humphreys Ltd. and The Windsor Group Hospital Management Committee.

While the film was shown at its full 101-minute duration in most other countries, the British Board of Film Classification ordered that the UK cinema version had to be cut down to 97 minutes in order to get an "A" (adult) classification, and that duration has remained in later British video releases.

== Reception ==
The film opened in London on 4 March 1966, with general release following on 3 April.

=== Critical ===
The Monthly Film Bulletin wrote: "Apart from a flurry of schoolboy smut about blanket baths and so forth, this depressing comedy relies almost exclusively on well-tried slapstick routines: people pulling each other into a swimming-pool, a fire extinguisher getting out of hand and soaking everybody in sight, laughing gas set off among the guests at a party. James Robertson Justice, Leslie Phillips and Joan Sims work hard without a funny line to share between them; and Arthur Haynes contributes a tiresome comedy turn (based on his TV persona) as an argumentative patient."

"The title alone will go a long way towards selling this picture", noted Graham Clarke in Kinematograph Weekly, "and it backs this with a good ration of knockabout fun."

Filmink argued it "felt different from others in the “doctor” franchise because the main doctor was not a straight man like Dirk Bogarde or Michael Craig but Phillips, who played a broad character type. However, there are genuine funny moments and stunning women and the movie was a big hit in Britain."

=== Box office ===
The film was among the 15 top money-makers at the British box-office that year.
