= The Facemaker =

1968 novel by Richard Gordon

- First edition
- Author: Richard Gordon
- Language: English
- Genre: Drama
- Publisher: Heinemann
- Publication date: 1967
- Publication place: United Kingdom
- Media type: Print
- Followed by: Surgeon at Arms

The Facemaker is a 1967 novel by the British writer Richard Gordon. It follows the career of Graham Trevose, a pioneering plastic surgeon working in the wake of the First World War on battle casualties. It was a more serious book in contrast to the comic Doctor series for which Gordon was better known. It was followed by a sequel Surgeon at Arms in 1968.

== Bibliography ==
- Peacock, Scott. Contemporary Authors. Cengage Gale, 2002.
