= Right to die (disambiguation) =

Right to die may refer to:

- Right to die, the decision about who should let an individual die
- Right to Die (film), a 1987 television drama
- Right to Die?, a 2008 television documentary
- Right to Die (Masters of Horror), a 2007 episode of the television series Masters of Horror
- A Right to Die, a 1964 Nero Wolfe detective novel by Rex Stout
