= The Pursuit of Justice =

1964 book by Robert F. Kennedy

- Author: Robert F. Kennedy
- Language: English
- Publisher: Harper & Row
- Publication date: 1964
- Publication place: United States
- Media type: Print
- Pages: 148
- Preceded by: N/A

The Pursuit of Justice is a book written by Robert F. Kennedy and published in 1964. The book consists of 12 revamped speeches delivered by Kennedy during his tenure as United States Attorney General. It was edited by Theodore J. Lowi.

The book was reviewed by Judge Roger J. Kiley.
