= The Captain (1971 film) =

- Directed by: Kurt Hoffmann
- Written by: Franz Seitz
- Based on: The Captain's Table by Richard Gordon
- Produced by: Franz Seitz; Walter Tjaden
- Starring: Heinz Rühmann; Johanna Matz; Horst Tappert
- Cinematography: Ernst Wild
- Edited by: Ingrid Bichler
- Music by: James Last
- Production company: Terra-Filmkunst
- Distributed by: Constantin Film
- Release date: 28 October 1971
- Running time: 93 minutes
- Country: West Germany
- Language: German

The Captain (German: Der Kapitän) is a 1971 West German comedy film directed by Kurt Hoffmann and starring Heinz Rühmann, Johanna Matz and Horst Tappert. The captain of an old tramp steamer is offered the chance to take over a luxury cruise ship.

The film is based upon the 1954 novel The Captain's Table by Richard Gordon. It is a remake of the British film The Captain's Table (1959). The film's sets were designed by the art directors Isabella Schlichting and Werner Schlichting. It was made at the Bavaria Studios in Munich and on location in Kiel.

== Cast ==
- Heinz Rühmann as Wilhelm Ebbs
- Johanna Matz as Claudia Lund
- Horst Tappert as Konsul Carstens
- Ernst Stankovski as Meier-Pollex
- Horst Janson as Jörg Neher
- Monika Lundi as Anette Breitenbach
- Hans Korte as Prittel
- Joseph Offenbach as Otto Krümel
- Günter Pfitzmann as Oldenburg
- Teri Tordai as Ilona Porter-Almassy
- Ruedi Walter as Friedrich Haas
- Margrit Rainer as Frau Haas
- Carl Lange as Victor Anderson
- Jane Hempel as Evelyn Moll

== Bibliography ==
- Bock, Hans-Michael & Bergfelder, Tim. The Concise CineGraph. Encyclopedia of German Cinema. Berghahn Books, 2009.
