= Nuts in May =

Nuts in May may refer to:

- "Nuts in May" (Play for Today)
- "Nuts in May" (rhyme)
- Nuts in May (film)
- Nuts in May (novel)
