= A Little Learning =

A Little Learning may refer to:

- "A little Learning is a dangerous thing", quotation from An Essay on Criticism by Alexander Pope
- A Little Learning (book), Evelyn Waugh's unfinished autobiography
- "A Little Learning" (My Hero), a 2002 television episode
- "A Little Learning" (Super Mario World), a 1991 television episode
