= Assignment K =

1968 British film by Val Guest

- Directed by: Val Guest
- Screenplay by: Val Guest; Bill Strutton; Maurice Foster
- Based on: Department K 1964 novel by Hartley Howard
- Produced by: Maurice Foster; Ben Arbeid
- Starring: Stephen Boyd; Camilla Sparv; Michael Redgrave; Leo McKern; Robert Hoffmann; Jeremy Kemp
- Cinematography: Ken Hodges
- Edited by: Jack Slade
- Music by: Basil Kirchin
- Color process: Technicolor
- Production companies: Gildor Productions; Mazurka Productions Ltd.
- Distributed by: Columbia Pictures
- Release date: 18 February 1968
- Running time: 97 minutes
- Country: United Kingdom
- Language: English

Assignment K (also known as Department K) is a 1968 British spy thriller film directed by Val Guest in Techniscope and starring Stephen Boyd, Camilla Sparv, Michael Redgrave, Leo McKern, Robert Hoffmann and Jeremy Kemp. It was written by Guest, Bill Strutton and Maurice Foster based on the 1964 novel Department K by Hartley Howard.

== Plot ==
A British spy has his cover blown, leading to the East German Stasi kidnapping his girlfriend to try to extract information about his double agents' activities.

== Cast ==
- Stephen Boyd as Philip Scott
- Camilla Sparv as Toni Peters
- Michael Redgrave as Harris
- Leo McKern as Smith
- Robert Hoffmann as Paul Spiegler
- Jeremy Kemp as Hal
- Jane Merrow as Martine
- Carl Möhner as Inspector (credited as Carl Moehner)
- Vivi Bach as Erika Herschel
- Werner Peters as Kramer
- Dieter Geissler as Kurt
- John Alderton as George
- Jan Werich as Dr. Spiegler
- David Healy as David
- Ursula Howells as Estelle
- Basil Dignam as Howlett
- Geoffrey Bayldon as The Boffin
- Joachim Hansen as Heinrich Herschel
- Windsor Davies as Joe
- Karl-Otto Alberty as fake policeman

== Production ==
Val Guest said "We shot it all out in Kitzbuhel, great cast: we had my Leo McKern again, and Michael Redgrave who was a very sick man, had terrible difficulties with his lines... Stephen [Boyd] was a wonderful person, a great giggler, a great professional, very nice guy."

== Critical reception ==
The Monthly Film Bulletin wrote: "Routine spy thriller, unimaginatively scripted and directed. The entirely conventional settings include the inevitable night clubs, expensive hotels and ski slopes (where the travelling matte is much in evidence). Stephen Boyd is bland and wooden as the toy tycoon/spy; Camilla Sparv has little to do but look alluring; and Leo McKern and Michael Redgrave appear fleetingly and to little effect. The plot meanders from dull beginning to dull end with nothing of interest in between."

Leslie Halliwell said: "Dreary espionage thriller, instantly forgettable, and only watchable at odd moments while it's on."

Writing in the Los Angeles Times, critic Charles Champlin commented: "the dialogue is intermittently sophisticated, very intermittently, and the total effect is old chapeau, very old chapeau."

== See also ==
- List of British films of 1968
