= Doctor in the Nest =

1979 novel by Richard Gordon

- First edition
- Author: Richard Gordon
- Language: English
- Series: Doctor series
- Genre: Comedy
- Publisher: Heinemann
- Publication date: 1979
- Publication place: United Kingdom
- Media type: Print
- Preceded by: Doctor on the Job
- Followed by: Doctor's Daughters

Doctor in the Nest is a 1979 comedy novel by the British writer Richard Gordon. Part of the long-running Doctor series, it finds Sir Lancelot Spratt struggling against cuts in the NHS which leaves his hospital in bad shape.

== Bibliography ==
- Pringle, David. Imaginary People: A Who's who of Fictional Characters from the Eighteenth Century to the Present Day. Scolar Press, 1996.
