= Doctor on Toast =

1961 novel by Richard Gordon

- First edition
- Author: Richard Gordon
- Language: English
- Series: Doctor series
- Genre: Comedy
- Publisher: Michael Joseph
- Publication date: 1961
- Publication place: United Kingdom
- Media type: Print
- Preceded by: Doctor in Clover
- Followed by: Doctor in the Swim

Doctor on Toast is a 1961 comedy novel by the British writer Richard Gordon. Part of his long-running Doctor series, it features Doctor Grimsdyke and his superior Sir Lancelot Spratt in a series of amusing situations.

== Adaptation ==
The novel provided a loose inspiration for the 1970 film Doctor in Trouble starring Leslie Phillips and Robert Morley.

== Bibliography ==
- Goble, Alan. The Complete Index to Literary Sources in Film. Walter de Gruyter, 1999.
