= Doctor in the Swim =

1962 novel by Richard Gordon

- First edition
- Author: Richard Gordon
- Language: English
- Series: Doctor series
- Genre: Comedy
- Publisher: Michael Joseph
- Publication date: 1962
- Publication place: United Kingdom
- Media type: Print
- Preceded by: Doctor on Toast
- Followed by: The Summer of Sir Lancelot

Doctor in the Swim is a 1962 comedy novel by the British writer Richard Gordon. It is part of the long-running Doctor series, and follows the womanising Doctor Grimsdyke as he gets into a number of scrapes.

== Bibliography ==
- Pringle, David. Imaginary People: A Who's who of Fictional Characters from the Eighteenth Century to the Present Day. Scolar Press, 1996.
