= Harry Ognall =

English jurist (1934–2021)

Sir Harry Ognall DL
- Born: January 9, 1934; Salford, Greater Manchester, England, U.K.
- Died: April 13, 2021 (aged 87)
- Education: Leeds Grammar School
- Alma mater: Lincoln College, Oxford; University of Virginia School of Law
- Occupations: Barrister, judge, author
- Years active: 1958–1999
- Known for: Prosecution of Peter Sutcliffe
- Father: Leopold Horace Ognall

Sir Harry Henry Ognall, DL (9 January 1934 – 13 April 2021) was an English High Court judge, barrister and author. He was well known for his prosecution of Peter Sutcliffe, dubbed the Yorkshire Ripper.

== Family and early life ==
Ognall was born in Salford, Greater Manchester, into a middle-class Jewish family, and grew up in Leeds. Ognall's father was journalist and crime author Leopold Horace Ognall (1908–1979), best known by his pen names of Hartley Howard and Harry Carmichael. Ognall was named Harry Henry after his grandfather, who had died one month before he was born. Ognall's father was born in Canada but grew up in Glasgow, where his grandfather served as provost of Rutherglen. Ognall's great-grandparents, Lazarus Ognall and Rachael Rosenstein, were Russian Jews who emigrated to Glasgow.

Ognall was educated at Leeds Grammar School. In 1953, he went to Lincoln College, Oxford, to read law, and attended the University of Virginia School of Law on scholarship.

== Career ==
Ognall was called to the bar at Gray's Inn in 1958 and took silk in 1973. He was a recorder from 1972 to 1986, when he was appointed to the High Court.

Ognall is best known for his prosecution of Peter Sutcliffe, dubbed the Yorkshire Ripper, for 13 murders in the 1970s and 1980s. As Queen's Counsel for the Crown's prosecution of Sutcliffe, Ognall was strongly opposed to Sutcliffe's defence strategy of claiming mental illness, which the Crown's psychiatric experts had been prepared to support.

As a judge, Ognall presided over the first trial for the murder of Rachel Nickell, in which he ruled that the police had shown "excessive zeal” and had tried to incriminate the accused, Colin Stagg (who was in fact innocent) by “deceptive conduct of the grossest kind".

Ognall also presided over the Lyme Bay kayaking tragedy trial; and the trial of Nigel Cox, the first doctor brought to trial in the UK for practising euthanasia.

Ognall was knighted in March 1986. He retired at the end of 1999. He was appointed a Deputy Lieutenant of West Yorkshire in August 2000.

== Personal life ==
In 1977, Ognall married Elizabeth Young in Bradford. He had two stepsons, and three children from a first marriage.

Ognall was portrayed by actor Simon Kunz in 2021 miniseries Deceit, which retold the story of Operation Edzell following the murder of Rachel Nickell.

== Bibliography ==
- Ognall, Sir Harry (2017). A Life of Crime: The Memoirs of a High Court Judge. William Collins. ISBN 978-0008267469.
