= Doctor in Love (novel) =

1957 novel by Richard Gordon

- First edition
- Author: Richard Gordon
- Language: English
- Series: Doctor series
- Genre: Comedy
- Publisher: Michael Joseph
- Publication date: 1957
- Publication place: United Kingdom
- Media type: Print
- Preceded by: Doctor at Large
- Followed by: Doctor and Son

Doctor in Love is a 1957 comedy novel by the British writer Richard Gordon. It is part of the long-running Doctor series of novels.

== Adaptation ==
It was turned into the 1960 film of the same title directed by Ralph Thomas and starring James Robertson Justice, Michael Craig and Leslie Phillips.

== Bibliography ==
- Goble, Alan. The Complete Index to Literary Sources in Film. Walter de Gruyter, 1999.
- Pringle, David. Imaginary People: A Who's who of Fictional Characters from the Eighteenth Century to the Present Day. Scolar Press, 1996.
