= Blood Will Tell (short story) =

- Short story by Rex Stout
- Country: United States
- Language: English
- Genre: Detective fiction

Publication
- Published in: Ellery Queen's Mystery Magazine
- Publication type: Periodical
- Publication date: December 1963
- Series: Nero Wolfe

"Blood Will Tell" is a Nero Wolfe mystery novella by Rex Stout, first published in the December 1963 issue of Ellery Queen's Mystery Magazine. It first appeared in book form in the short-story collection Trio for Blunt Instruments, published by the Viking Press in 1964.

== Plot introduction ==
Archie Goodwin receives a blood-stained tie in the mail from the owner of a small walk-up apartment building in lower Manhattan, who also lives on the top floor. Archie investigates, only to find yet another dead body and now has to sort out the mess, preferably collecting a fee along the way since the other adventures in this volume have not earned the costly Nero Wolfe operation a cent.

== Plot summary ==
Archie is sorting through the mail one Tuesday morning when an unusual envelope catches his attention. Bearing the return address of composer James Neville Vance, the envelope contains a bloodstained tie and a note for Archie to keep it until Vance makes contact with him. After receiving a call claiming to be from Vance instructing him to destroy the envelope and contents, Archie heads to Vance's apartment to investigate.

Vance denies any knowledge about the envelope, though he admits the tie is one of nine he owns, designed uniquely for him, adding that one is missing and another was gifted to a friend. When the janitor and a patrol officer come to ask Vance for access to the apartment belonging to Bonny & Martin Kirk, Archie joins them; together, they discover Bonny's corpse, head smashed in with a vodka bottle.

The next day, a disheveled Martin Kirk comes to the brownstone to hire Wolfe, who immediately takes him on as a client. Kirk reveals that Vance gifted him one of his neckties two months ago and that Bonny was a serial adulterer, with one of her lovers being another neighbor, Paul Fougere. During the conversation, Paul's wife Rita arrives, having followed Kirk. Wolfe sends Kirk home to look for the necktie and speaks with Rita, who reveals that she knew about the affair and that she is in love with Kirk.

Kirk calls and informs them that the necktie is missing; he and Rita decide to visit Vance to ask him about the envelope. The meeting turns bloody when Paul shows up unannounced, and Kirk accuses Paul of killing Bonny out of jealousy. After the fight subsides, Sergeant Stebbins arrives to take Kirk in for questioning.

Wolfe asks Archie to use the threat of a defamation lawsuit in order to bring Paul in, and the Fougeres do come to the brownstone four hours later. They find out from Paul that Vance has also been pining for Bonny.

As the conversation ends, Archie and Wolfe independently determine the identity of the culprit. When Inspector Cramer arrives, Wolfe lets him in on their deductions, asking him to hold the culprit for question and sending Archie, Saul, Fred, and Orrie to search that person's residence. While there, they find not only the clue that confirms their deductions but also a grisly trophy of the crime.

== Publication history ==
=== Blood Will Tell" ===
- 1963, Ellery Queen's Mystery Magazine, December 1963
- 1971, Ellery Queen's Anthology, Fall–Winter 1971

=== Trio for Blunt Instruments ===
- 1964, New York: The Viking Press, April 24, 1964, hardcover

Contents include "Kill Now—Pay Later", "Murder Is Corny" and "Blood Will Tell".
In his limited-edition pamphlet, Collecting Mystery Fiction #10, Rex Stout's Nero Wolfe Part II, Otto Penzler describes the first edition of Trio for Blunt Instruments: "Orange cloth, front cover and spine printed with blue rules; the front cover printed with blue lettering; the spine is printed with black lettering; rear cover blank. Issued in a mainly red pictorial dust wrapper."
In April 2006, Firsts: The Book Collector's Magazine estimated that the first edition of Trio for Blunt Instruments had a value of between $150 and $300. The estimate is for a copy in very good to fine condition in a like dustjacket.

- 1964, New York: Viking (Mystery Guild), June 1964, hardcover

The far less valuable Viking book club edition may be distinguished from the first edition in three ways:

- The dust jacket has "Book Club Edition" printed on the inside front flap, and the price is absent (first editions may be price clipped if they were given as gifts).
- Book club editions are sometimes thinner and always taller (usually a quarter of an inch) than first editions.
- Book club editions are bound in cardboard, and first editions are bound in cloth (or have at least a cloth spine).

- 1965, London: Collins Crime Club, January 1965, hardcover
- 1967, New York: Bantam #F-3298, January 1967
- 1997, New York: Bantam Crimeline ISBN 0-553-24191-5 January 1, 1997, paperback
- 1997, Newport Beach, California: Books on Tape, Inc. ISBN 0-7366-4061-4 October 31, 1997, audio cassette (unabridged, read by Michael Prichard)
- 2010, New York: Bantam Crimeline ISBN 978-0-307-75629-9 July 21, 2010, e-book
