= The Medical Witness =

1971 novel by Richard Gordon

- First edition
- Author: Richard Gordon
- Language: English
- Genre: Drama
- Publisher: Heinemann
- Publication date: 1971
- Publication place: United Kingdom
- Media type: Print

The Medical Witness is a 1971 novel by the British writer Richard Gordon. The story concerns John Rumbelow, the leading pathologist in the country whose word is often counted on in murder trials.

== Bibliography ==
- Peacock, Scott. Contemporary Authors. Cengage Gale, 2002.
