= The Summer of Sir Lancelot =

1963 novel by Richard Gordon

- First edition
- Author: Richard Gordon
- Language: English
- Series: Doctor series
- Genre: Comedy
- Publisher: Heinemann
- Publication date: 1965
- Publication place: United Kingdom
- Media type: Print
- Preceded by: Doctor in the Swim
- Followed by: Love and Sir Lancelot

The Summer of Sir Lancelot is a 1965 comic novel by the British writer Richard Gordon. The fearsome surgeon Sir Lancelot Spratt goes into retirement, committed to spending his time trout fishing. However the antics of his niece Euphemia and a dispute over fishing rights soon disturb his peace.

== Bibliography ==
- Pringle, David. Imaginary People: A Who's who of Fictional Characters from the Eighteenth Century to the Present Day. Scolar Press, 1996.
