= Kill Now—Pay Later =

- Short story by Rex Stout
- Designed by Saul Bass
- Country: United States
- Language: English
- Genre: Detective fiction

Publication
- Published in: The Saturday Evening Post
- Publication type: Periodical
- Publication date: December 1961
- Series: Nero Wolfe

"Kill Now—Pay Later" is a Nero Wolfe mystery novella by Rex Stout, first serialized in three issues of The Saturday Evening Post (December 9, 16 and 23–30, 1961). It first appeared in book form in the short-story collection Trio for Blunt Instruments, published by the Viking Press in 1964.

== Plot summary ==
Wolfe's aging Greek bootblack is accused of murder and Wolfe feels he owes him something since he (apparently) listens eagerly to Wolfe's dissertations on ancient Greek culture during every shoe-shining session and moreover has told the police that "Wolfe is a great man".

== Publication history ==
=== "Kill Now—Pay Later" ===
- 1961, The Saturday Evening Post, December 9 + December 16 + December 23/30, 1961
- 1975, Ellery Queen's Mystery Magazine, April 1975
- 1978, Ellery Queen's Anthology, Fall–Winter 1978

=== Trio for Blunt Instruments ===
- 1964, New York: The Viking Press, April 24, 1964, hardcover

Contents include "Kill Now—Pay Later", "Murder Is Corny" and "Blood Will Tell"
In his limited-edition pamphlet, Collecting Mystery Fiction #10, Rex Stout's Nero Wolfe Part II, Otto Penzler describes the first edition of Trio for Blunt Instruments: "Orange cloth, front cover and spine printed with blue rules; the front cover printed with blue lettering; the spine is printed with black lettering; rear cover blank. Issued in a mainly red pictorial dust wrapper."
In April 2006, Firsts: The Book Collector's Magazine estimated that the first edition of Trio for Blunt Instruments had a value of between $150 and $300. The estimate is for a copy in very good to fine condition in a like dustjacket.

- 1964, New York: Viking (Mystery Guild), June 1964, hardcover

The far less valuable Viking book club edition may be distinguished from the first edition in three ways:

- The dust jacket has "Book Club Edition" printed on the inside front flap, and the price is absent (first editions may be price clipped if they were given as gifts).
- Book club editions are sometimes thinner and always taller (usually a quarter of an inch) than first editions.
- Book club editions are bound in cardboard, and first editions are bound in cloth (or have at least a cloth spine).

- 1965, London: Collins Crime Club, January 1965, hardcover
- 1967, New York: Bantam #F-3298, January 1967
- 1997, New York: Bantam Crimeline ISBN 0-553-24191-5 January 1, 1997, paperback
- 1997, Newport Beach, California: Books on Tape, Inc. ISBN 0-7366-4061-4 October 31, 1997, audio cassette (unabridged, read by Michael Prichard)
- 2010, New York: Bantam Crimeline ISBN 978-0-307-75629-9 July 21, 2010, e-book
