= Arthur Haynes =

British comedian

- In character as a tramp
- Born: 14 May 1914; London, England
- Died: 19 November 1966 (aged 52); Ealing, London, England
- Occupation: Comedian
- Years active: 1946–1966

Arthur Haynes (14 May 1914 – 19 November 1966) was an English comedian and star of The Arthur Haynes Show, a comedy sketch series produced by ATV from 1956 until his death from a heart attack in 1966. Haynes also appeared on radio and in films.

== Early life ==
Arthur Haynes was born in London, the only child of a Fulham baker. He started off in a number of odd jobs, doing painting (he was very proud of his painting in later years), plumbing and joinery until the Second World War broke out. He then became an entertainer while serving with the Royal Engineers during the war. Fellow comedian Charlie Chester related a story where they were waiting outside Caen and Haynes pointed to a trench full of mud and a million tiny frogs and said nothing would get him into that. Just then a German aircraft started firing near them and Haynes dived straight into the trench and afterwards emerged covered in mud and frogs.

== Career ==
With Charlie Chester he was part of the British Army's concert party troupe Stars in Battledress. He continued to work with Chester after the war in the BBC Radio series Stand Easy (1946–49). Chester had not originally wanted to feature him as he had a full cast but once he heard Haynes give a high-pitched laugh, he knew he could use it and found a place for him. They became a double act in the show where Chester wrote the scripts. Much later, the comedian returned to BBC radio with The Arthur Haynes Show (1962–65) which ran over four series. He also recorded Arthur Again. Both series were scripted by Johnny Speight.

On 21 February 1956, Haynes appeared in the first edition of ATV variety series Strike a New Note, which was supposed to air talent for the new independent television station. Nicholas Parsons (in That Reminds Me, April 1999) said the show was awful, but he was offered a role after the first few episodes and joined it. After a few more shows there was a clearout and everyone but Haynes and Parsons went. After several appearances in this show, written by Dick Barry and John Antrobus along with Johnny Speight who had been sending in sketches for Haynes. The show was soon renamed Get Happy. Haynes, who had been a stand-up comedian, was given his own series later in the year and Parsons, who had been an all-rounder, found himself cast as his straight man.

His ATV series, The Arthur Haynes Show (1956–66), networked on ITV, made Haynes the most popular comedian in Britain. There were 95 thirty-minute shows, 62 thirty-five-minute shows and one fifty-minute show, spread over fifteen series. Haynes's most popular character was a working class tramp – created by Johnny Speight, now better known for creating Alf Garnett. Speight said he got the idea of the tramp from a real tramp who climbed into his Rolls-Royce when it was stopped at a traffic light. In 1963 and 1964 Haynes worked with Dermot Kelly who played another tramp (called Irish), who was not very bright. Sometimes Patricia Hayes would join them as a female tramp. In early episodes, the shows were played out on a theatre stage, and basic scenery and props were used where, for instance, the audience could see outside and inside a house, as there was no wall on their side. Later episodes had improved sets. The stars sometimes forgot (or did not bother to learn) their lines, and would ad lib them. If someone fluffed a line, that would be used to get more laughs. Haynes and others sometimes failed to keep a straight face and occasionally burst into laughter.

The shows would also feature musical guests, such as the Springfields in 1963, Kenny Ball and his Jazzmen and the Rolling Stones in 1964, and Joe Brown and the Bruvvers and the Dave Clark Five in 1965. A number of the shows started and ended with Arthur Haynes driving a horse and cart along a narrow country lane, whistling and (unconvincingly) playing a harmonica. Some began with a cartoon workman using a road drill on the show's title.

Haynes received the Variety Club's award as ITV Personality of 1961 and appeared on the Royal Variety Performance in the same year. The shows also made a star of Nicholas Parsons, who had first appeared with Haynes in Strike a New Note and Get Happy and who tended to play supercilious neighbours and authority figures in the comedy sketches. Eventually, as the public began to recognise Parsons' skill as a straight man, Haynes decided to dispense with his services. Other stars also made early appearances: in 1962 Michael Caine played a burglar burgling the same house as Haynes's character. Haynes had a good singing voice, which he rarely used on TV, and in 1960 performed a sketch called The Haynes Brothers, where he and Dickie Valentine, wearing a moustache, sang together.

In 1965, Haynes appeared in the Rock Hudson/Gina Lollobrigida film Strange Bedfellows. While in Hollywood, Cary Grant turned up with an entourage at a place where Haynes was staying and lavished great praise on him, calling him the greatest comedy star in the world. In 1966, he appeared as a patient in the British film Doctor in Clover.

== Music ==
In 1963 he recorded the novelty songs "Not To Worry" and "Looking Around".

== Death and legacy ==
Haynes died of a heart attack on 19 November 1966 in Ealing, at the age of 52, shortly after he returned from America, where he had appeared on The Ed Sullivan Show, and just before the commencement of shooting for the 16th series of his ITV television series. He is buried at Mortlake Cemetery in Kew, London. His wife Queenie died on 7 November 2010, aged 95.

=== DVD release ===
Between 2011 and 2013, Network DVD released all surviving episodes of The Arthur Haynes Show (from film recordings) on Region 2 DVDs. Volume 1 contains thirteen of the earliest surviving episodes from 1960, while Volume 2 contains twelve episodes dating from 1961. Volumes 3 and 4 contain episodes from 1962, Volumes 5 and 6 both containing episodes based on scripts by Johnny Speight. Volume 7 completes the sequence.

A single collection set titled The Collected Arthur Haynes Show, consisting of all seven volumes, was released on 24 April 2017.
