= Trio for Blunt Instruments =

- First edition
- Author: Rex Stout
- Cover artist: Bill English
- Language: English
- Series: Nero Wolfe
- Genre: Detective fiction
- Publisher: Viking Press
- Publication date: April 24, 1964
- Publication place: United States
- Media type: Print (hardcover)
- Pages: 247 pp. (first edition)
- OCLC: 36962358
- Preceded by: The Mother Hunt
- Followed by: A Right to Die

Trio for Blunt Instruments is a collection of Nero Wolfe mystery novellas by Rex Stout, published in 1964 by the Viking Press in the United States and simultaneously by MacMillan & Company in Canada. The book comprises three stories:

- "Kill Now—Pay Later", serialized in three issues of The Saturday Evening Post (December 9, 16 and 23–30, 1961)
- "Murder Is Corny", previously unpublished; the last Nero Wolfe novella to be written, and the last published in Stout's lifetime
- "Blood Will Tell", first published in Ellery Queen's Mystery Magazine (December 1963)

== Reviews and commentary ==
- Jacques Barzun and Wendell Hertig Taylor, A Catalogue of Crime — Of these, the first is a compendium of all the author's merits—a fast tale of double murder, drama, conflict with officialdom, banter about love, and a violent ending on Wolfe's premises, where the vulnerable heroine is a refugee. The second has agricultural elements that do not go well with the quasi-sexual drama; and the third is a premeditated crime rather simply untwisted. Archie is good throughout."
- Anthony Boucher, The New York Times (May 17, 1964) — This time he offers, in addition to two solidly admirable specimens, one that may well be the finest Nero Wolfe case of the past decade. By no means fail to read "Blood Will Tell" — and look forward (like me) to even more impressive mastery from Mr. Stout when he reaches his eighties.
- John Canaday, The New York Times (May 28, 1964) — Rex Stout, who gives his birth date as Dec. 1, 1886, is either the victim of false records or the beneficiary of a biological aberration, eternal youth. His new New Wolfe threesome, Trio for Blunt Instruments, keeps him right where he has been for so long — on top of the heap and the liveliest of all detective fiction writers.

== Publication history ==
- 1964, New York: The Viking Press, April 24, 1964, hardcover
  In his limited-edition pamphlet, Collecting Mystery Fiction #10, Rex Stout's Nero Wolfe Part II, Otto Penzler describes the first edition of Trio for Blunt Instruments: "Orange cloth, front cover and spine printed with blue rules; the front cover printed with blue lettering; the spine is printed with black lettering; rear cover blank. Issued in a mainly red pictorial dust wrapper."
  In April 2006, Firsts: The Book Collector's Magazine estimated that the first edition of Trio for Blunt Instruments had a value of between $150 and $300. The estimate is for a copy in very good to fine condition in a like dustjacket.
  The "concept-driven" dustjacket designed by Bill English was cited by graphic design scholar Steven Heller for its spare use of color, sans-serif typography and use of the entire front and back cover area.
- 1964, New York: Viking (Mystery Guild), June 1964, hardcover
  The far less valuable Viking book club edition may be distinguished from the first edition in three ways:
  - The dust jacket has "Book Club Edition" printed on the inside front flap, and the price is absent (first editions may be price clipped if they were given as gifts).
  - Book club editions are sometimes thinner and always taller (usually a quarter of an inch) than first editions.
  - Book club editions are bound in cardboard, and first editions are bound in cloth (or have at least a cloth spine).
- 1965, London: Collins Crime Club, January 1965, hardcover
- 1967, New York: Bantam #F-3298, January 1967
- 1997, New York: Bantam Crimeline ISBN 0-553-24191-5 January 1, 1997, paperback
- 1997, Newport Beach, California: Books on Tape, Inc. ISBN 0-7366-4061-4 October 31, 1997, audio cassette (unabridged, read by Michael Prichard)
- 2010, New York: Bantam Crimeline ISBN 978-0-307-75629-9 July 21, 2010, e-book
