= Doctor on the Brain =

1972 novel by Richard Gordon

- First edition
- Author: Richard Gordon
- Language: English
- Series: Doctor series
- Genre: Comedy
- Publisher: Heinemann
- Publication date: 1972
- Publication place: United Kingdom
- Media type: Print
- Preceded by: Doctor on the Boil
- Followed by: Doctor in the Nude

Doctor on the Brain is a 1972 comedy novel by the British writer Richard Gordon. Part of the long-running Doctor series, it takes place at St Swithan's Hospital.

== Bibliography ==
- Pringle, David. Imaginary People: A Who's who of Fictional Characters from the Eighteenth Century to the Present Day. Scolar Press, 1996.
