= Doctor on the Boil =

1970 novel by Richard Gordon

- First edition
- Author: Richard Gordon
- Language: English
- Series: Doctor series
- Genre: Comedy
- Publisher: Heinemann
- Publication date: 1970
- Publication place: United Kingdom
- Media type: Print
- Preceded by: Love and Sir Lancelot
- Followed by: Doctor on the Brain

Doctor on the Boil is a 1970 comedy novel by the British writer Richard Gordon. Bored with his retirement, Sir Lancelot Spratt returns to St Swithan's Hospital to resume his work and disturbs almost everyone else there.

== Bibliography ==
- Pringle, David. Imaginary People: A Who's who of Fictional Characters from the Eighteenth Century to the Present Day. Scolar Press, 1996.
