= Doctor on the Job =

1973 novel by Richard Gordon

- First edition
- Author: Richard Gordon
- Language: English
- Series: Doctor series
- Genre: Comedy
- Publisher: Heinemann
- Publication date: 1976
- Publication place: United Kingdom
- Media type: Print
- Preceded by: Doctor in the Nude
- Followed by: Doctor in the Nest

Doctor on the Job is a 1976 comedy novel by the British writer Richard Gordon, part of the long-running Doctor series. In it, to the fury of Sir Lancelot Spratt, a major strike occurs at St Swithan's Hospital.

== Bibliography ==
- Pringle, David. Imaginary People: A Who's who of Fictional Characters from the Eighteenth Century to the Present Day. Scolar Press, 1996.
