= Surgeon at Arms =

1968 novel by Richard Gordon

- First edition
- Author: Richard Gordon
- Language: English
- Genre: Drama
- Publisher: Heinemann
- Publication date: 1968
- Publication place: United Kingdom
- Media type: Print
- Preceded by: The Facemaker

Surgeon at Arms is a 1968 novel by the British writer Richard Gordon. It is the sequel to The Facemaker about a pioneering plastic surgeon, who now faces the growing casualties of the Second World War.

== Bibliography ==
- Peacock, Scott. Contemporary Authors. Cengage Gale, 2002.
