= Murder Is Corny =

Mystery novella by Rex Stout

- Short story by Rex Stout
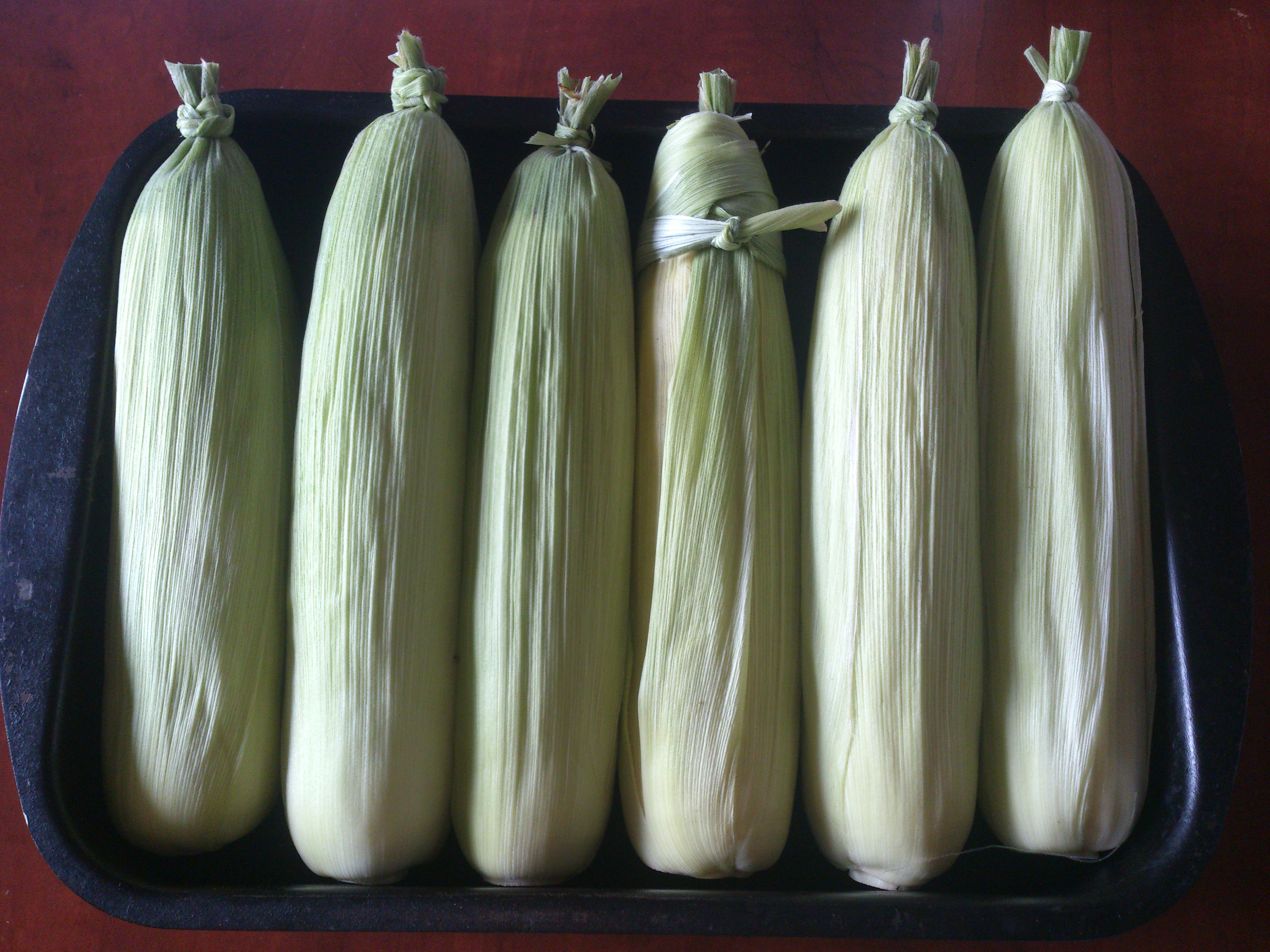
- Corn prepared for roasting
- Country: United States
- Language: English
- Genre: Detective fiction

Publication
- Published in: Trio for Blunt Instruments
- Publisher: Viking Press
- Media type: Hardcover
- Publication date: April 24, 1964
- Series: Nero Wolfe

"Murder Is Corny" is a Nero Wolfe mystery novella by Rex Stout, first published in April 1964 in the short-story collection Trio for Blunt Instruments (Viking Press). It was the last Nero Wolfe novella to be written, and the last published in Stout's lifetime.

== Plot summary ==
Shucked and boiled in water, sweet corn is edible and nutritious; roasted in the husk in the hottest possible oven for forty minutes, shucked at the table, and buttered and salted, nothing else, it is ambrosia. No chef's ingenuity and imagination have ever created a finer dish.

— Nero Wolfe in "Murder Is Corny", chapter 1

=== Setting the stage ===
Inspector Cramer comes to Wolfe's front door unannounced and unexpectedly on a Tuesday evening in September, carrying a carton of freshly picked corn, normally provided by a farmer named Duncan McLeod up in Putnam County, with many questions about the death of Kenneth Faber, a part-time helper of McLeod's who should have delivered the corn much earlier that day, along with 9 other similar cartons to Rusterman's Restaurant, previously owned and run by Wolfe's childhood friend Marko Vukčič, but now in trusteeship to Wolfe under the terms of Marko's will (for the circumstances of Marko's death see The Black Mountain).

Archie Goodwin, who answered the door, tells Cramer he has met Faber briefly only, since he has been delivering Duncan's corn for the past 5 weeks, which Wolfe (and Rusterman's) order according to exacting standards. However, Archie knows that Faber likes Duncan's daughter Susan McLeod. Faber is actually a free-lance cartoonist, but prevailed on his friend to have her father give him a job at the farm. Later on, it transpires that real motive was not the extra money but the chance to see Sue on weekends.

Meanwhile, Wolfe, in an apparent disdain for Archie's situation, unpacks the carton of corn right on his desk, and informs Cramer that the corn is substandard: of the 16 ears of corn, 8 are substandard, 8 are acceptable.

Cramer asks Archie for an alibi for certain times in the afternoon just past. Archie says that he was with Saul Panzer (a long-time Wolfe operative, but independent) at a ball game at Yankee Stadium. Cramer discounts the alibi saying Panzer would lie for Archie and Wolfe.

Eventually it develops that Susan McLeod found Faber's dead body, skull smashed in at the loading bay of Rusterman's, in the time in question, and has given a statement saying she had arranged to meet Archie there.

On the strength of her statement, Cramer takes him in as a material witness, with a hint that the charge will be escalated to first-degree murder soon.

After being bailed out by Nathaniel Parker, Archie arrives home at 11:20 Wednesday morning, very short of sleep, he finds that Susan McLeod is at Wolfe's house (where Archie lives), waiting to see him, asking for his help, despite the fact that she just got him arrested!

=== Dénouement ===
This sets the stage where Archie, without at first help from Wolfe, must decide between helping a pretty girl in trouble and saving his own skin.

Along the way, we discover, among other things, that Miss McLeod herself used to deliver the corn, and that's how Archie met her two years ago, that Archie's friend (girlfriend) Lily Rowan had found her a place to stay in Manhattan and introduced her to Carl Heydt, a high-class couturier. Since then she has become a high class model, with five male admirers, in the suspicious eyes of the police: Faber, Archie, Heydt, Max Maslow, and Peter Jay. Faber, who exhibits the traits of a stalker, has apparently been spreading stories about his making Miss McLeod pregnant in order to force her to marry him to keep her reputation intact.

=== Analysis ===
The story, apart from its crime detection aspects, is a story about how a simple, very beautiful, country girl comes to the big city, enters the world of high fashion, but cannot escape the risqué side of big city life. Nor is the country life in Putnam County devoid of moral failings, and they both play a part in the final resolution of this story.

== Publication history ==
=== "Murder Is Corny" ===
- 1978, Ellery Queen's Mystery Magazine, January 1978 (as "The Sweet Corn Murder")

=== Trio for Blunt Instruments ===
- 1964, New York: The Viking Press, April 24, 1964, hardcover

Contents include "Kill Now—Pay Later", "Murder Is Corny" and "Blood Will Tell".
In his limited-edition pamphlet, Collecting Mystery Fiction #10, Rex Stout's Nero Wolfe Part II, Otto Penzler describes the first edition of Trio for Blunt Instruments: "Orange cloth, front cover and spine printed with blue rules; the front cover printed with blue lettering; the spine is printed with black lettering; rear cover blank. Issued in a mainly red pictorial dust wrapper."
In April 2006, Firsts: The Book Collector's Magazine estimated that the first edition of Trio for Blunt Instruments had a value of between $150 and $300. The estimate is for a copy in very good to fine condition in a like dustjacket.

- 1964, New York: Viking (Mystery Guild), June 1964, hardcover

The far less valuable Viking book club edition may be distinguished from the first edition in three ways:

- The dust jacket has "Book Club Edition" printed on the inside front flap, and the price is absent (first editions may be price clipped if they were given as gifts).
- Book club editions are sometimes thinner and always taller (usually a quarter of an inch) than first editions.
- Book club editions are bound in cardboard, and first editions are bound in cloth (or have at least a cloth spine).

- 1965, London: Collins Crime Club, January 1965, hardcover
- 1967, New York: Bantam #F-3298, January 1967
- 1997, New York: Bantam Crimeline ISBN 0-553-24191-5 January 1, 1997, paperback
- 1997, Newport Beach, California: Books on Tape, Inc. ISBN 0-7366-4061-4 October 31, 1997, audio cassette (unabridged, read by Michael Prichard)
- 2010, New York: Bantam Crimeline ISBN 978-0-307-75629-9 July 21, 2010, e-book

== Adaptations ==
=== Nero Wolfe (A&E Network) ===
"Murder Is Corny" was adapted for the second season of the A&E TV series A Nero Wolfe Mystery (2001–2002). Directed by George Bloomfield from a teleplay by Lee Goldberg and William Rabkin, the episode made its debut May 5, 2002, on A&E.

Timothy Hutton is Archie Goodwin; Maury Chaykin is Nero Wolfe. Other members of the cast (in credits order) include Colin Fox (Fritz Brenner), Bill Smitrovich (Inspector Cramer), R. D. Reid (Sergeant Purley Stebbins), David Calderisi (Carl Heydt), George Plimpton (Nathaniel Parker), Robert Bockstael (Max Marow), Bruce McFee (Duncan McLeod), Julian Richings (Peter Jay) and Kari Matchett (Susan McLeod).

In addition to original music by Nero Wolfe composer Michael Small, the soundtrack includes music by Derek Watkins, Colin Sheen and Jamie Talbot (titles), (Note: Derek Watkins, Colin Sheen and Jamie Talbot, "Cue the Glitz". KPM Music Ltd. KPM 441, Putting On the Glitz (track 6).) Ray Davies (Note: Ray Davies, "Clarinet Caprice". JW Media Music Ltd., JW 2016, The Big Band Box (track 3).) and Amilcare Ponchielli. (Note: Amilcare Ponchielli, "The Dance of the Hours" from La Gioconda. KPM Music, KPM CS 7, Light Classics Volume One (track 24).)

A Nero Wolfe Mystery is available on DVD from A&E Home Video (ISBN 0-7670-8893-X).

The adaptation is very faithful to the story, though there are three major changes: the confrontation between Max Maslow, Peter Jay, Carl Heydt, and Archie Goodwin where Maslow proposes they give Archie "the bum's rush" is moved from Jay's apartment to the hallway of Wolfe's brownstone, two soldiers arrive at Wolfe's office to inspect the bomb sent by Duncan MacLeod instead of the bomb squad taking the bomb to examine it, and the novella's coda between Archie and Susan MacLeod during a party at Lily Rowan's penthouse is dropped in favor of a closing scene with Nero and Archie in which Archie asks, "Where are we going to get our corn?" Wolfe's only reply is, "Pfui."

=== La bella bugiarda (Radiotelevisione Italiana) ===
"Murder Is Corny" was adapted for a series of Nero Wolfe films produced by the Italian television network RAI (Radiotelevisione Italiana). Directed by Giuliana Berlinguer from a teleplay by Edoardo Anton, Nero Wolfe: La bella bugiarda first aired January 7, 1971.

The series of black-and-white telemovies stars Tino Buazzelli (Nero Wolfe), Paolo Ferrari (Archie Goodwin), Pupo De Luca (Fritz Brenner), Renzo Palmer (Inspector Cramer), Roberto Pistone (Saul Panzer), Mario Righetti (Orrie Cather) and Gianfranco Varetto (Fred Durkin). Other members of the cast of La bella bugiarda include Gianna Serra (Susan McLeod), Mario Carra (Max Maslow), Leo Gavero (Felix), Giacomo Piperno (Carl Heydt), Marino Masé (Peter Jay) and Mario Carotenuto (McLeod).
