= The Invisible Victory =

1977 novel by Richard Gordon

- First edition
- Author: Richard Gordon
- Language: English
- Genre: Thriller
- Publisher: Heinemann
- Publication date: 1977
- Publication place: United Kingdom
- Media type: Print

The Invisible Victory is a 1977 spy thriller novel by the British writer Richard Gordon. A young British chemist working in Germany in the late 1930s is recruited by British intelligence to work on stealing scientific research from the Nazi authorities.

== Bibliography ==
- Peacock, Scott. Contemporary Authors. Cengage Gale, 2002.
