= Love and Sir Lancelot =

1965 novel by Richard Gordon

- First edition
- Author: Richard Gordon
- Language: English
- Series: Doctor series
- Genre: Comedy
- Publisher: Heinemann
- Publication date: 1965
- Publication place: United Kingdom
- Media type: Print
- Preceded by: The Summer of Sir Lancelot
- Followed by: Doctor on the Boil

Love and Sir Lancelot is a 1965 comedy novel by the British writer Richard Gordon. It is the tenth novel in the long-running Doctor series. The medical students of opposite sexes at St Swithan’s Hospital try to get around Sir Lancelot Spratt's attempts to segregate them from each other, while Sir Lancelot's protégé Simon Sparrow becomes involved with a film star.

== Bibliography ==
- Pringle, David. Imaginary People: A Who's who of Fictional Characters from the Eighteenth Century to the Present Day. Scolar Press, 1996.
