= Doctor in the Nude =

1973 novel by Richard Gordon

- Author: Richard Gordon
- Language: English
- Series: Doctor series
- Genre: Comedy
- Publisher: Heinemann
- Publication date: 1973
- Publication place: United Kingdom
- Media type: Print
- Preceded by: Doctor on the Brain
- Followed by: Doctor on the Job

Doctor in the Nude is a 1973 comedy novel by the British writer Richard Gordon. It is part of the long-running Doctor series.

== Bibliography ==
- Pringle, David. Imaginary People: A Who's who of Fictional Characters from the Eighteenth Century to the Present Day. Scolar Press, 1996.
