= Doctor in Clover (novel) =

1960 novel by Richard Gordon

- First edition
- Author: Richard Gordon
- Language: English
- Series: Doctor series
- Genre: Comedy
- Publisher: Michael Joseph
- Publication date: 1960
- Publication place: United Kingdom
- Media type: Print
- Preceded by: Doctor and Son
- Followed by: Doctor on Toast

Doctor in Clover is a 1960 comedy novel by the British writer Richard Gordon. It is part of Gordon's long-running Doctor series of books.

== Adaptation ==
In 1966 it served as a loose basis for the film of the same title directed by Ralph Thomas and starring Leslie Phillips and James Robertson Justice.

== Bibliography ==
- Goble, Alan. The Complete Index to Literary Sources in Film. Walter de Gruyter, 1999.
- Pringle, David. Imaginary People: A Who's who of Fictional Characters from the Eighteenth Century to the Present Day. Scolar Press, 1996.
