= Disappearance of Joan Risch =

1961 Massachusetts missing person case

Coordinates: 42.45475°N 71.29897°W

Joan Carolyn Risch
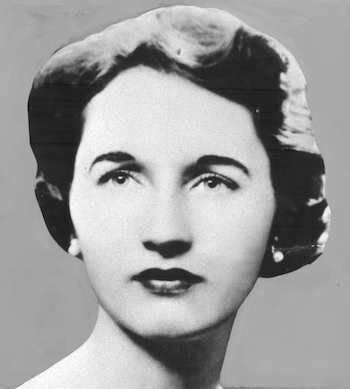
- Risch in 1960
- Born: Joan Carolyn Bard; May 12, 1930; Brooklyn, New York, U.S.
- Disappeared: October 24, 1961 (aged 31); Lincoln, Massachusetts, U.S.
- Status: Missing for 64 years, 10 months and 8 days
- Other name: Joan Carolyn Nattrass
- Education: Wilson College (BA)
- Occupations: Editor, homemaker
- Employer(s): Harcourt Brace World; Thomas Y. Crowell Co.
- Height: 5 ft 7 in (170 cm)
- Spouse: Martin Risch (m. 1956)
- Children: 2

On October 24, 1961, Joan Carolyn Risch (née Bard; also known as Joan Nattrass), a 31-year-old housewife, disappeared under mysterious circumstances from her home in Lincoln, Massachusetts. That afternoon, a neighbor discovered a trail of blood leading from the house to the driveway after Risch's young daughter returned from a playdate to find her mother missing. Several unconfirmed sightings of a disoriented woman matching Risch's description were reported nearby later that day, but she has not been seen since.

Initial evidence suggested a possible abduction, though her two-year-old son was found safe inside the house. Later discoveries revealed that Risch had borrowed library books about disappearances and unsolved murders, prompting speculation that she may have staged her own disappearance. Other theories suggest she may have suffered an accident near a nearby construction site. Her fate remains unknown.

== Background ==
Joan Carolyn Bard was born in Brooklyn, New York, on May 12, 1930, to Harold and Josephine Bard. By the age of eight, her family had moved to Mountain Lakes, New Jersey, where, in February 1939, her parents died in a fire. This fire was later described as suspicious, although an investigation was ultimately inconclusive and the local fire chief deemed it accidental. Joan was visiting relatives in Brooklyn at the time. She subsequently went to live with her maternal aunt and her husband, who formally adopted her. Joan took their last name as her own and applied for a Social Security number as Joan Nattrass. It was later reported that Joan told an acquaintance she had been sexually abused as a child by her stepfather. (Note: Implicated in Joan's possible sexual abuse was her stepfather, Frank Nattrass. Her husband told police that she "just blurted it out one time and did not go into detail." Nattrass denied the allegation during an interview with investigators following her disappearance; he died in 1970.)

After graduating in 1952 from Wilson College in Chambersburg, Pennsylvania, with a degree in English literature, Joan went to work in New York City publishing companies. She started as a secretary, later moving to supervise the secretarial pool and ultimately became an editorial assistant at Harcourt Brace and World and later Thomas Y. Crowell Co. In 1956 she married an executive at one of the companies, Martin Risch, and left work to raise a family with him.

Living in Ridgefield, Connecticut, the couple had their first child, Lillian, the year after their wedding; a son, David, followed in 1959. In April 1961 they moved to Lincoln, Massachusetts, a suburb of Boston, where they easily integrated into the community. Joan became active in the League of Women Voters while Martin pursued a career with a paper company in Fitchburg. Joan spoke of becoming a teacher after the children got older.

== Disappearance ==
On the morning of October 24, 1961, Martin got up early and left the house in his car for Logan Airport to catch an 8 a.m. flight to New York. It was a business trip he had planned earlier, with the intention of staying overnight in Manhattan. Shortly after his departure, Joan woke the children and served them breakfast. She took her son across the street to the house of a neighbor, Barbara Barker, and left with Lillian in her car, a blue 1951 Chevrolet, (Note: Photos taken at the Risch house during the investigation show a two-door sedan, with features (such as the taillights) consistent with a 1951 Chevrolet Deluxe.) for an appointment with a Bedford dentist who had been recommended by a college friend named Sabra Morton.

Following the appointment, Risch took Lillian on a brief shopping trip to a nearby department store, paying in cash. At the family home on Old Bedford Road, milk and mail were delivered while the Risches were absent. Neither the milkman nor postman reported anything unusual at the residence when questioned later. After picking up David at the Barker residence, Risch and the children returned home at roughly 11:15 a.m. Shortly afterward, a delivery driver for a dry cleaner came to the house to pick up several of Martin's suits. He entered the house to do so and did not recall anything out of the ordinary about Joan or the house. Following his visit, Risch changed from the more formal clothing she had worn to the dentist's appointment and her shopping into a blue housedress and white sneakers.

Risch made lunch for her children and put David into his room for his afternoon nap, which almost always lasted until 2 p.m. At 1 p.m., Barbara Barker brought her son, Douglas, also aged 4, over to play with Lillian. During the time they were there, they observed Risch come in and out to prune some plants and put the shears she had used back in the garage. Shortly before 2 p.m. Risch came out again and took the children back across the street to the Barkers' house. She told the two she would be back. Lillian later told police she did not see anyone else in the area at the time. She and Douglas played on a swing set from which they could not see the Risch house. Around 2:15 p.m., Barker briefly saw Joan, wearing what she thought was a trench coat over her clothing, move quickly up her driveway, carrying something red with outstretched arms from her car towards the garage. At the time she assumed her neighbor was chasing one of the children. This proved to be the last confirmed time sighting of Joan.

An hour later, Virginia Keene, the daughter of the Risches' next-door neighbors, got off the school bus. As she neared her home, she recalled seeing an unfamiliar car, possibly a General Motors model, which was dirty and two-tone with one of the colors being blue. Five minutes later, another nearby resident said they stopped while driving up Old Bedford Road to let a car back out of either the Keenes' or the Risches' driveway. Both Virginia and her mother said there was no car in their driveway at that time. Barbara Barker took Lillian back to her home at 3:40 p.m., intending to take her children out on a shopping trip with her. Believing Joan was still in the house, she left. When she returned at 4:15 p.m., Lillian came back to the Barkers' house, telling Barbara: "Mommy is gone and the kitchen is covered with red paint." Lillian's brother was found crying in his crib because his diaper needed to be changed. After Barbara went to the Risch house herself and verified Lillian's account, she called the police at 4:33 p.m.

== Investigation ==
Sgt. Mike McHugh of the Lincoln police arrived at the house within five minutes. After briefly talking with Barker, he went into the Risch house. In the kitchen he found the bloody smears on the walls, an overturned table, and the handset of the wall-mounted telephone ripped loose and thrown in the wastebasket, which had been taken from its usual place under the sink and left in the middle of the floor. McHugh believed Risch might have committed suicide and searched the house for her body. When he did not find it, he realized he would need backup searching the surrounding area. He called the desk officer who had dispatched him and advised him to call the police chief, Leo Algeo. It was possible, he believed, that the entire department would need to be involved. The Lincoln police called local hospitals and asked to be notified if a woman matching Risch's description showed up, or already had been admitted. Barker had called Martin's company to find out where he was; when she learned he was in New York on business, the Massachusetts State Police called him there to inform him of the family emergency. He changed his plans and caught the next flight back to Boston.

In the house, police found further clues. Four letters delivered that day to the mailbox at the foot of the driveway had not yet been brought in. In the kitchen, the telephone directory was found to have been opened to the page where emergency numbers could be written down, although none had been. Martin explained that an empty liquor bottle found in the wastebasket was one he and his wife had finished the night before, but could not explain where empty beer bottles found in it might have come from. Risch had left behind the trench coat she had worn to the dentist that morning but appeared to have taken a plainer cloth coat. Also in the house was her pocketbook. Investigators determined that after her purchases since cashing the check the previous evening, she would have had less than $10 ($108 in 2025) left.

=== Possible later sightings ===
In canvassing the neighborhood, police found several other residents who reported possible sightings of Risch after Barker had last seen her. At 2:45 p.m. that afternoon, a woman wearing clothing similar to what Risch had last been seen in, along with a kerchief over her head tied around her chin, was seen walking along the north side of Massachusetts Route 2A, west of its junction with Old Bedford Road, headed toward Concord. She appeared to be wandering, hunched over as if she were cold, and appeared untidy. A similarly dressed woman, with blood running down her legs, was seen walking north on the Route 128 median strip in Waltham between 3:15 p.m. and 3:30 p.m., just north of Winter Street. She, too, seemed disoriented and appeared to be cradling something at her stomach. Another sighting, reportedly around 4:30 p.m., had the woman walking south along Route 128 near Trapelo Road.

Police also received some reports of the car that Virginia Keene had reported in the Risches' driveway. Their regular milkman stated that he had seen a car of that description when he made his morning delivery at the Risch residence five days earlier. Another neighbor told investigators she had seen a blue two-tone car parked on Sunnyside Lane, a street that intersected Route 2A near Old Bedford Road, at 4:15 p.m. She saw a man get out, cut some branches from the nearby woods, and put them in his vehicle. Another man said he saw a light blue 1959 Ford sedan parked along Sunnyside Lane at 2:45 p.m.

=== Blood evidence ===
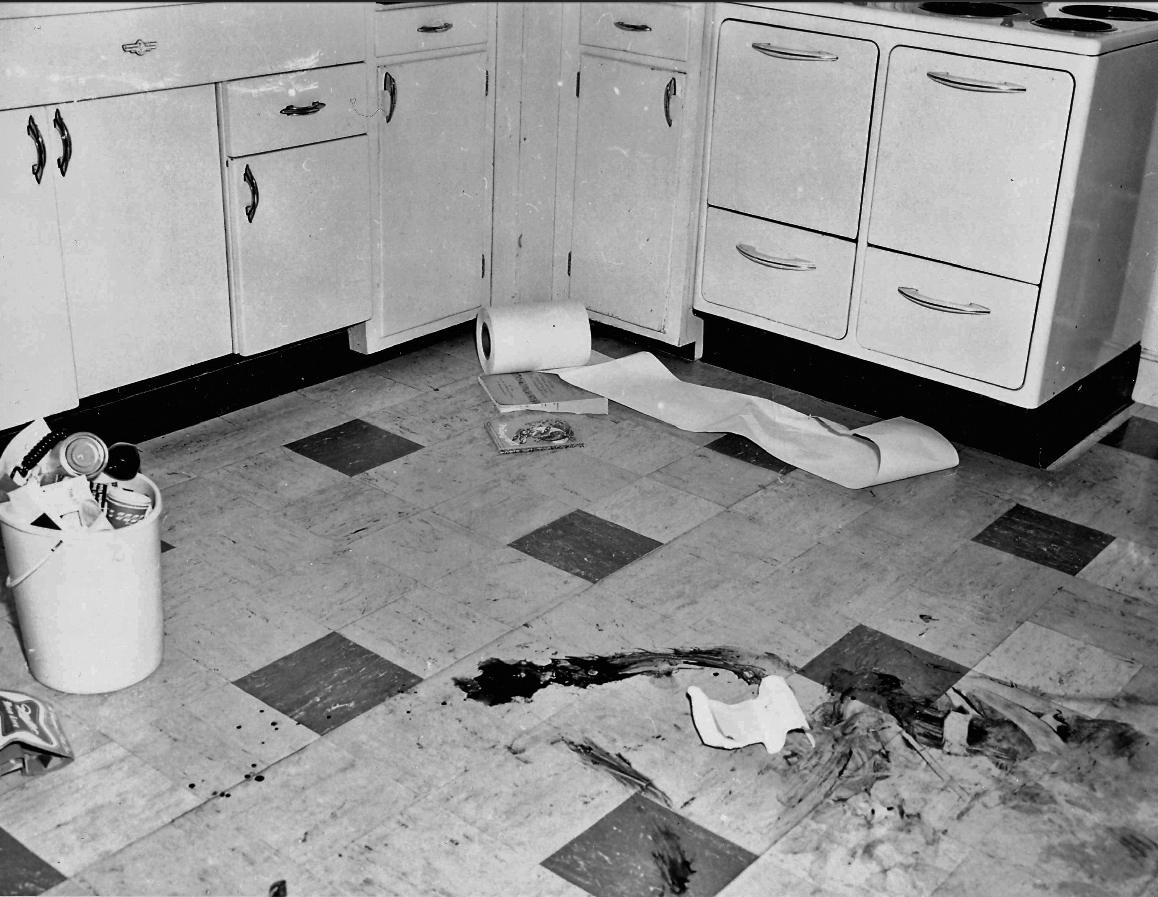
Some of the blood smears in the Risches' kitchen, as photographed by local police following Joan's disappearance

Although the blood evidence was plentiful, investigators could not conclude from it what might have occurred. Large smears were on the kitchen walls and floor; some were on the phone as well. Three bloody fingerprints were unidentified; in Risch's absence, they could not be compared with hers. A roll of drawing paper was on the floor; one had been used to wipe some blood, possibly off of a hand. Also, a coverall and pair of underpants belonging to David were on the floor. Both were bloodied as well, possibly from an attempt to clean up the blood. The coverall also appeared to have been pressed into the floor, as if a heavy weight—such as a body—had lain on them for some time. Police said later that while the bloodstains in the kitchen might have resulted from a struggle, they seemed more consistent with someone staggering around and trying to support themselves following an injury. The kitchen was not the only place blood was found, however, and the blood found elsewhere in the house—as well as outside—complicated that narrative. A 1/8-inch-wide (3.2 mm) drop was on the first step of the stairway. Two more of similar size were found at the top of the stairs, along with eight in the master bedroom and one near a window in the children's bedroom.

Another trail of blood led out of the kitchen into the driveway. It ended at Joan's car, which was stained in three places: the right rear fender, the left side of the hood near the windshield, and the very center of the trunk. Investigators found this last one particularly hard to interpret. It could not be determined where the bleeding might have started: upstairs, in the kitchen, or the driveway; all possibilities were supported by the evidence. Also open was the question of whether Risch had left under her own power or had been accompanied or even carried, perhaps involuntarily. The end of the trail in the driveway might have indicated that she had gotten into another car at that point, but that was not certain either.

What investigators did not find was also significant. Despite the large bloody smears on the kitchen floor and evidence of activity elsewhere in the house, there were no bloody footprints. Whoever had been walking there had either been extremely careful or very fortunate. The blood was found to have been type O, which is both the most common and the type Risch was known to have. A state police chemist found that despite appearances of a severe wound, the total blood shed amounted to merely half a pint (240 ml), which would not have suggested a life-threatening injury.

=== Library records ===
In the wake of Risch's disappearance, Sareen Gerson, a reporter with The Fence Viewer local newspaper, went to the town's public library to research similar cases as background. In one of the books she checked out, which discussed the purported disappearance of Brigham Young's 27th wife, (Note: The Twenty-Seventh Wife by Irving Wallace, a book about Ann Eliza Young, was first published in June 1961. Near the end of the book, Wallace discussed how she "vanished into thin air" after publishing an unsuccessful book, Life in Mormon Bondage, in 1908.) she saw that Risch had borrowed the book in September, a month before her disappearance. In another, Into Thin Air—about a woman who, like Risch, had left behind blood smears and a towel when she went missing—Gerson again found Risch's signature on the checkout card.

Gerson reported her findings in the newspaper. A group of library volunteers who looked through records found that Risch, a regular borrower, had taken out 25 books over the summer of 1961, many of which also had to do with murders and missing person cases. Based on this, Gerson and her colleagues at the newspaper believed Joan might have staged the crime scene and disappeared voluntarily. Two of the books that Joan had signed out, Into Thin Air and The Screaming Rabbit, were authored by Harry Carmichael, a pen name of British writer Leo Ognall. A 1964 article published in The Boston Globe noted that Gerson wrote to Ognall after the discovery of books that Risch had borrowed from the library. Ognall became interested in the disappearance and developed this own theory—he stated that he felt Risch was still alive, somewhere between Boston and New York, but was afraid to come forward because "she harbors a terrible secret." At the time the article was published, Ognall was in the process of incorporating his theory into a fictionalized account, to be issued as a book. (Note: Reviews of Flashback, issued in late 1964 by Ognall using his Carmichael pen name, indicate it was based on Joan's disappearance. The crux of Ognall's theory, as revealed in Flashback, is that Risch (named "Janet Kilmuir" in the book) was visited at her home by an ex-lover who attempted to assault her, resulting in Risch bludgeoning the man to death with a paperweight and then driving away with his body in the car he had arrived in.)

=== Possible suspect ===
Police investigated a man on whom neighbors had cast suspicion, Robert Foster of East Walpole. In 1959, Congress had designated an area which included the Risch's neighborhood as Minute Man National Historical Park, recognizing its historical importance as the route British troops had taken when they marched out of Boston to the Battles of Lexington and Concord on April 19, 1775, considered the beginning of the Revolutionary War. Plans called for acquiring and removing all structures built after 1775, thus restoring the area to its historic appearance. Foster, a purchasing agent with the National Park Service, had been visiting homes in the area to discuss the project.

According to a state police detective who interviewed him a week after the disappearance, some of the women Foster had talked to felt he had "overstayed his welcome." Records showed Foster had visited the Risch home on September 25, a month before Joan vanished. On the day she disappeared, Foster told the detective, he went out for lunch with his supervisor around 1 p.m. By 3 p.m., he recalled, he went back to the Lincoln area to meet with a property appraiser. The supervisor verified the account and also vouched for two civil engineers who had been working in the area for him making preparations for the park, saying they were in his office around 3 p.m. as well.

== Subsequent developments ==
Rewards for information that would close the case were offered by the state police, the town of Lincoln, and the Boston Record American newspaper, which ran an extensive package of articles about the case on the first weekend of 1962. No useful leads, however, were developed after the initial investigation. Bodies found in the region in later years proved not to be Joan. Martin continued to live in the same house and raise his children. He never had his wife declared legally dead. In 1975, the National Park Service, in developing the area for the park, bought the Risch's and others' properties and moved the Risch house to Lexington; Martin moved to another house nearby. He died in 2009 at the age of 79.

== Theories ==
With no further evidence emerging after the initial investigation, all theories of Risch's fate have remained, and the case maintains its open status. Risch's library book history and her difficult past have supported Gerson's theory that her disappearance was planned as a way to escape a dissatisfying life. Sabra Morton, the college friend who had recommended the dentist Joan visited that morning, said that was unlikely, as Risch was very content with her life as a suburban housewife.

"I think Joan is almost certainly dead," Morton told The Boston Globe in 1996. "She would never have left her family on her own." The reported sightings of a woman who matched Risch's description walking along area roads have lent support to a theory that she met an accidental end. In the 1990s, one investigator believed that she might have become disoriented and fallen into a pit along the Route 128 construction site, where she might not have been able to extricate herself and ended up buried when the road was finished.

Martin rarely talked about the case in his later years. On one occasion when he had, the Globe reported, he believed his wife was still alive. He speculated that she may have had amnesia or a psychological break and had forgotten how to return home. Joan neither had a history of mental illness, nor had any cases been reported in her family. Algeo continued to pursue the case, even after his retirement from the police force in 1970. He told the Globe it was "sort of a stone around [his] neck." He had a theory but preferred not to share it. "I thought they'd find a body or bones or something ... Things do turn up. People don't disappear without a trace." Algeo also died in 2009, the last of the original investigators on the case.

== See also ==
- List of people who disappeared mysteriously: 1910–1990
