= Doctor and Son =

1959 novel by Richard Gordon

- First edition
- Author: Richard Gordon
- Language: English
- Series: Doctor series
- Genre: Comedy
- Publisher: Michael Joseph
- Publication date: 1959
- Publication place: United Kingdom
- Media type: Print
- Preceded by: Doctor in Love
- Followed by: Doctor in Clover

Doctor and Son is a 1959 comedy novel by the British writer Richard Gordon. It is the fifth novel in Gordon's Doctor series. Returning from his honeymoon, Simon Sparrow looks forwards to time spent at his new home. However his peace is interrupted when his friend Doctor Grimsdyke invites himself to stay, as well as the interventions of his mentor Sir Lancelot Spratt.

== Bibliography ==
- Pringle, David. Imaginary People: A Who's who of Fictional Characters from the Eighteenth Century to the Present Day. Scolar Press, 1996.
