= Doctor at Large (film) =

1957 British film by Ralph Thomas

- Original British cinema poster
- Directed by: Ralph Thomas
- Screenplay by: Nicholas Phipps
- Based on: Doctor at Large; 1955 novel by Richard Gordon
- Produced by: Betty Box
- Starring: Dirk Bogarde; Muriel Pavlow; Donald Sinden; James Robertson Justice
- Cinematography: Ernest Steward
- Edited by: Frederick Wilson
- Music by: Bruce Montgomery
- Production company: Rank Organisation Film Productions
- Distributed by: Rank Film Distributors
- Release date: 26 March 1957
- Running time: 94 minutes
- Country: United Kingdom
- Language: English

Doctor at Large is a 1957 British comedy film directed by Ralph Thomas starring Dirk Bogarde, Muriel Pavlow, Donald Sinden, James Robertson Justice and Shirley Eaton. It is the third of the seven films in the Doctor series, and is based on the 1955 novel of the same title by Richard Gordon.

== Plot ==
Back at St Swithin's, Dr Simon Sparrow loses out to the self-important Dr Bingham for a job as senior house surgeon. Feeling that he has no future as a surgeon, he takes a general practice job in an industrial town. He finds that he has to do most of the work, including night calls, and is also the target of his partner's flirty wife.

He then takes a locum job with Dr Potter-Shine's Harley Street practice, where most of the patients are dotty aristocrats and neurotic society women. Leaving after three months, he moves to a rural practice where patients pay in kind, ranging from home-grown raspberries to poached salmon.

Meanwhile, Tony Benskin fails his finals – again – and travels to Ireland where he buys a very dubious medical degree. This leads to a post as private physician to a rich elderly aristocratic lady in Wiltshire.

Sparrow and Benskin take a short holiday in France, where they save Dr Hopcroft, a governor at St Swithin's, from an embarrassing incident. In return, he arranges for Sparrow and Benskin to return to St Swithin's. Sparrow commences advanced surgical training with Sir Lancelot Spratt, whilst Benskin becomes personal physician to a rich Maharajah.

== Main cast ==
- Dirk Bogarde as Dr Simon Sparrow
- Muriel Pavlow as Joy Gibson
- Donald Sinden as Dr Tony Benskin
- James Robertson Justice as Sir Lancelot Spratt
- Shirley Eaton as Nurse Nan McPherson
- Derek Farr as Dr Potter-Shine
- Michael Medwin as Dr Charles Bingham
- Martin Benson as Maharajah
- John Chandos as O'Malley
- Edward Chapman as Wilkins
- George Coulouris as Pascoe
- Judith Furse as Mrs Digby
- Gladys Henson as Mrs Wilkins
- Anne Heywood as Emerald
- Ernest Jay as Charles Hopcroft
- Lionel Jeffries as Dr Hatchet
- Mervyn Johns as Smith
- Geoffrey Keen as second examiner
- Dilys Laye as Mrs Jasmine Hatchet
- Harry Locke as Porter
- Terence Longdon as George, House Surgeon
- A. E. Matthews as Duke of Skye and Lewes
- Guy Middleton as Major Porter
- Barbara Murray as Kitty
- Dandy Nichols as lady in Outpatients Dept.
- Nicholas Phipps as Mr Wayland, solicitor
- Wensley Pithey as Sam, poacher
- Maureen Pryor as Mrs Dalton
- Noel Purcell as "Padre", pub landlord
- George Relph as Dr Farquarson
- Athene Seyler as Lady Hawkins
- Ronnie Stevens as waiter at hotel
- Ernest Thesiger as first examiner
- Michael Trubshawe as Colonel Graves

== Production ==
Anne Heywood who had recently signed with the Rank Organisation had a small role. Shirley Eaton had been under contract to Alex Korda but that contract passed to the Rank Organisation when Korda died.

== Reception ==
=== Box office ===
The film was the second most popular movie of the year at the British box office, after High Society.

=== Critical ===
The Monthly Film Bulletin wrote: "Even more episodic than its predecessors, Doctor at Large relies largely for its effect on verbal jokes and 'cameo' appearances by a galaxy of familiar character actors. The material is highly variable: some scenes are sharply satirical, others concentrate too heavily on a mixture of slapstick and revue facetiousness and some are noticeably tasteless. Aided by a swift tempo and suitably rumbustious playing, the total effect is quite entertaining, except possibly for those members of the audience who are about to enter hospital."

Variety noted "a blending of light comedy and a dash of sentiment, with punch comedy lines providing timely shots in the arm. They're welcome when they come, but they're too irregular," with the reviewer concluding, "Bogarde, of course, is the mainstay of the story, but Justice again emerges as the standout character".

The New York Times wrote that despite "signs of fatigue," with the film prescribing the same mixture as before, "If it is diluted, it is still not too hard to take."

Filmink called it "breezy, cheery fun... giving Bogarde's character a decent "arc"."

The Radio Times Guide to Films gave the film 3/5 stars, writing: "In this third entry in the series inspired by the novels of Richard Gordon, Dirk Bogarde, as accident-prone houseman Simon Sparrow, once again escapes the confines of St Swithin's in order to explore pastures new, in this case a country practice where nothing goes right. But it's only once he's back under the beady gaze of James Robertson-Justice that the film comes to life. This is amiable enough, but everyone is just a touch off colour, and the film shows signs of the terminal decline that would set in after Bogarde quit the series."

British film critic Leslie Halliwell said: "Hit-or-miss medical comedy with honours about even."

In British Sound Films: The Studio Years 1928–1959 David Quinlan rated the film as "good", writing: "Corny-copia of medical jokes raises quite a few laughs."
