= The Captain's Table (novel) =

1954 novel by Richard Gordon

- First edition
- Author: Richard Gordon
- Language: English
- Genre: Comedy
- Publisher: Michael Joseph
- Publication date: 1954
- Publication place: United Kingdom
- Media type: Print

The Captain's Table is a 1954 comedy novel by the British writer Richard Gordon. The captain of a rundown cargo ship is transferred by the company to command a luxury liner.

== Adaptations ==
In 1959 it was made into a British film of the same title directed by Jack Lee and starring John Gregson and Donald Sinden. A West German adaptation The Captain was produced in 1971 starring Heinz Rühmann and Johanna Matz.

== Bibliography ==
- Goble, Alan. The Complete Index to Literary Sources in Film. Walter de Gruyter, 1999.
