= SS Orsova =

SS Orsova may refer to:

- SS Orsova (1909), an ocean liner operated by the Orient Steam Navigation Company 1909–1936.
- SS Orsova (1953), an ocean liner operated by the Orient Steam Navigation Company 1954–1966.
