= Ervin Lázár =

Hungarian author

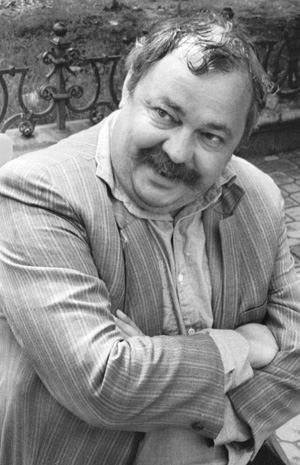
Lázár in Budapest, June 22, 1989

Ervin Lázár (May 5, 1936 – December 22, 2006) was a Hungarian author. Although he wrote a novel (A fehér tigris (The White Tiger), 1971) and a number of short stories, he is best known for his tales and stories for children.

== Bibliography ==
This is a list of books written by Ervin Lázár, with literal translations of their titles:

- A kisfiú meg az oroszlánok (1964, The Little Boy and the Lions)
- Csonkacsütörtök (1966, Short Thursday)
- Egy lapát szén Nellikének (1969, A Shovel-full of Coal for Nelli)
- Buddha szomorú (1973, Buddha Is Sad)
- A fehér tigris (novel, 1971, The White Tiger)
- A Hétfejű Tündér (children's stories, 1973, The Seven-Headed Fairy)
- Berzsián és Dideki (children's stories, 1979, Berzsián and Dideki)
- Gyere haza, Mikkamakka (children's novel, 1980, Come Home, Mikkimakka)
- A Masoko Köztársaság (1981, The Masoko Republic)
- Szegény Dzsoni és Árnika (children's story, 1981, Poor Dzsoni and Árnika)
- A négyszögletű kerek erdő (children's novel, 1985, The Square Circular Wood)
- Bab Berci kalandjai (children's novel, 1989, The Adventures of Berci Bab)
- A Franka cirkusz (radio stories, 1990, The Franka Circus)
- A manógyár (children's stories, 1994, The Dwarf Factory)
- Hét szeretőm (short stories, 1994, My Seven Lovers)
- Csillagmajor (short stories, 1996, Csillag Manor)
- Kisangyal (short stories, 1997, Little Angel)
- Hapci király (short stories, 1998, King Atishoo)
- Lehel kürtje (short stories, Lehel's Horn)
