= Saint-Judas-de-la-nuit =

Fantasy novel by Jean Ray

Saint-Judas-de-la-nuit is a 1964 Belgian fantasy novel by Jean Ray.

== Links ==
- Wilmart, Jean-Marie (1997). "Saint-Judas-de-la-Nuit, roman de la duplicité antinomique". Textyles (in French) (1–4): 233–242. doi:10.4000/textyles.1691.
