= The House of Bernarda Alba =

Play by Federico García Lorca

- Original language: Spanish
- Written by: Federico García Lorca
- Characters: Bernarda Alba (60); María Josefa (80s); Angustias (39); Magdalena (30); Amelia (27); Martirio (24); Adela (20); Maid (50); Poncia (60); Criada (50); Prudencia (50); Beggar woman Little girl Women mourners First woman Second woman Third woman Fourth woman Girl
- Genre: Drama

Premiere
- Date: 8 March 1945
- Place: Avenida Theatre; Buenos Aires, Argentina

The House of Bernarda Alba (Spanish: La casa de Bernarda Alba) is a play by the Spanish dramatist Federico García Lorca. Commentators have often grouped it with Blood Wedding and Yerma as the Rural Trilogy. García Lorca did not include it in his plan for a "trilogy of the Spanish land" (which remained unfinished at the time of his murder).

García Lorca described the play in its subtitle as a drama of women in the villages of Spain. The House of Bernarda Alba was García Lorca's last play, completed on 19 June 1936, two months before his assassination during the Spanish Civil War. The play was first performed on 8 March 1945 at the Avenida Theatre in Buenos Aires. The play centers on the events of a house in Andalusia during a period of mourning, in which Bernarda Alba (aged 60) wields total control over her five daughters Angustias (39 years old), Magdalena (30), Amelia (27), Martirio (24), and Adela (20). The housekeeper (Poncia) and Bernarda's elderly mother (María Josefa) also live there.

The deliberate exclusion of any male character from the action helps build up the high level of sexual tension that is present throughout the play. Pepe "el Romano", the love interest of Bernarda's daughters and suitor of Angustias, never appears on stage. The play explores themes of repression, passion, and conformity, and inspects the effects of men upon women.

== Plot summary ==
Upon her second husband's death, domineering matriarch Bernarda Alba imposes an eight-year mourning period on her household in accordance with her family tradition. Bernarda has five daughters, aged between 20 and 39, whom she has rigidly controlled and prohibited from any form of relationship. The mourning period further isolates them and tension mounts within the household.

After a mourning ritual at the family home, eldest daughter Angustias enters, having been absent while the guests were there. Bernarda fumes, assuming she had been listening to the men's conversation on the patio. Angustias inherited a large sum of money from Bernarda's first husband, while Bernarda's second husband has left only small sums to his four daughters. Angustias' wealth attracts a young, attractive suitor from the village, Pepe el Romano. Her sisters are jealous, believing it unfair that plain, sickly Angustias should receive both the majority of the inheritance and the freedom to marry and escape their suffocating home.

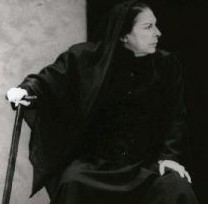
Minerva Mena in La casa de Bernarda Alba

Youngest sister Adela, stricken with sudden spirit and jubilation after her father's funeral, defies her mother's orders and dons a green dress instead of remaining in mourning black. Her brief taste of youthful joy shatters when she discovers that Angustias will be marrying Pepe. Poncia, Bernarda's maid, advises Adela to bide her time: Angustias will probably die delivering her first child. Distressed, Adela threatens to run into the streets in her green dress, but her sisters manage to stop her. Suddenly they see Pepe coming down the street. Adela stays behind while her sisters rush to get a look, until a maid hints that she could get a better look from her bedroom window.

As Poncia and Bernarda discuss the daughters' inheritances upstairs, Bernarda sees Angustias wearing makeup. Appalled that Angustias would defy her orders to remain in a state of mourning, Bernarda violently scrubs the makeup off her face. The other daughters enter, followed by Bernarda's elderly mother, Maria Josefa, who is usually locked away in her room. Maria Josefa announces that she wants to get married; she also warns Bernarda that she'll turn her daughters' hearts to dust if they cannot be free. Bernarda forces her back into her room.

It is revealed that Adela and Pepe are having a secret affair. Adela becomes increasingly volatile, defying her mother and quarreling with her sisters, particularly Martirio, who reveals her own feelings for Pepe. Adela shows the most horror when the family hears the latest gossip about how the townspeople recently tortured a young woman who had delivered and killed an illegitimate baby.

Tension explodes as family members confront one another, leading to Bernarda pursuing Pepe with a gun. A gunshot is heard outside the home. Martirio and Bernarda return and imply that Pepe has been killed. Adela flees into another room. With Adela out of earshot, Martirio tells everyone else that Pepe actually fled on his pony. Bernarda remarks that as a woman she can't be blamed for poor aim. A loud noise is heard; Bernarda immediately calls for Adela, who has locked herself into a room. When she doesn't respond, Bernarda and Poncia force the door open. Poncia's shriek is heard. She returns with her hands clasped around her neck and warns the family not to enter the room. Adela, not knowing that Pepe survived, has hanged herself.

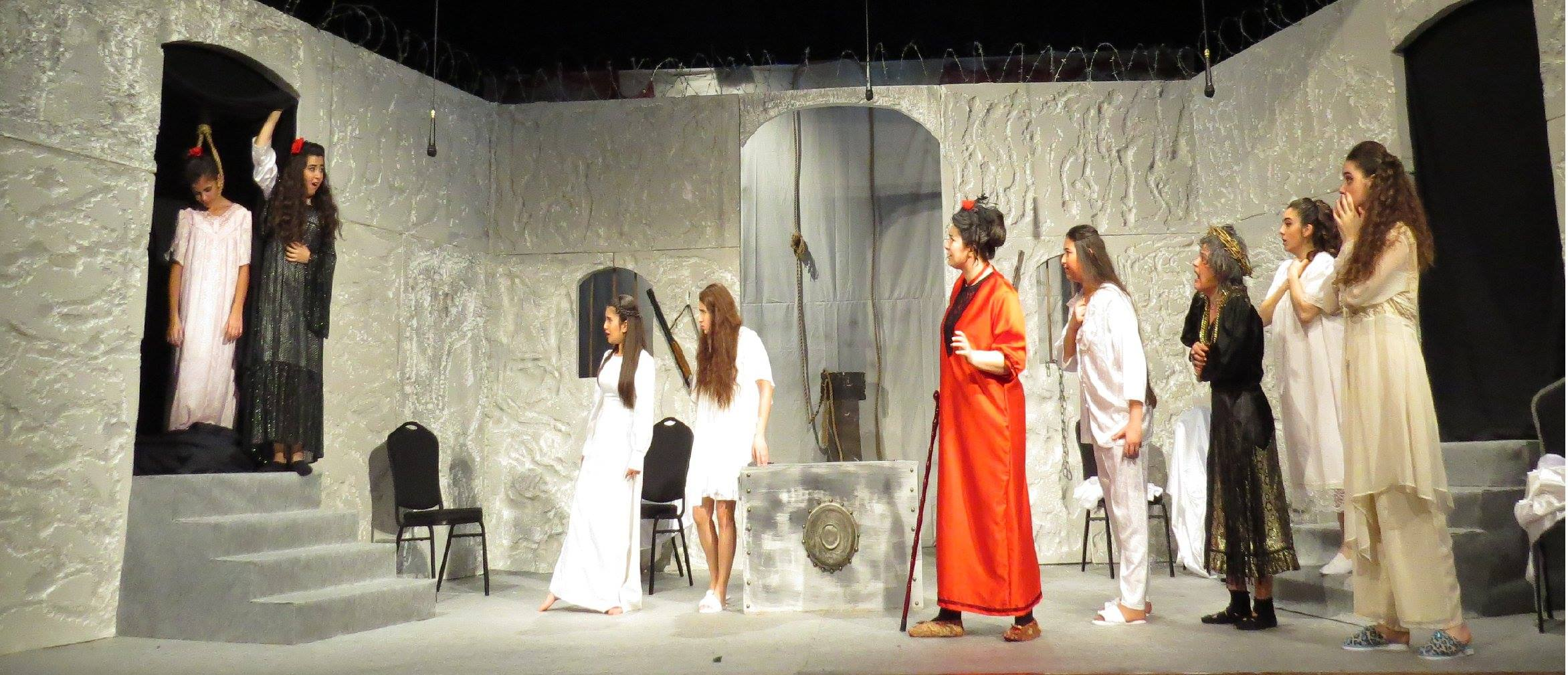
The House of Bernarda Alba by the senior generation of Hamazkayin "Arek" Theatre.

The closing lines of the play show Bernarda characteristically preoccupied with the family's reputation, not registering that Adela and Pepe had an affair due to her moral code. She insists that Adela has died a virgin and demands that this be made known to the whole town. Bernarda forbids her daughters to cry.

== Adaptations ==
Stage adaptations include:

- 1973: English adaptation by Tom Stoppard. It premiered at the Greenwich Theatre with Robin Phillips as the director.
- 1979: Birjis Qadar Ka Kunba (The family of Birjis Qadar), a Hindi adaptation by Raghuvir Sahay.
- 2004: Bnat Lalla Mennana (The daughters of Lalla Mennana), a Moroccan adaptation by the Takoon theatre group. It was made into a TV series in 2012.
- 2012: Emily Mann's adaptation into Iranian setting. It opened at the Almeida Theatre under the director Bijan Sheibani, starring Shohreh Aghdashloo as Bernarda.
- 2018: Australian adaptation by Patricia Cornelius for Melbourne Theatre Company. It was staged at the Fairfax Studio and featured Melita Jurisic as Bernadette (Bernarda).
- 2019: Ang Tahanan ni Bernarda Alba, the first Filipino adaptation directed and translated in Filipino by Alexander Cortez for the University of the Philippines' Dulaang UP.
- 2023: Adaptation by Alice Birch at the Royal National Theatre, with Harriet Walter as Bernarda Alba.
- 2027: A second Filipino adaptation by Chay Yew, translated by Guelan Varela-Luarca for Theatre Group Asia with Lea Salonga as Bernarda Alba

=== Film and television ===
Film and television adaptations include:

- 1976: BBC production of the same title in English, directed by Claude Whatham, with Mary Morris as Bernarda.
- 1987: Film adaptation of the same title, directed by Mario Camus.
- 1991: TV film adaptation of the same title in English, directed by Núria Espert, with Glenda Jackson as Bernarda.
- 1991: Rukmavati ki Haveli (Rukmavati's mansion), a Hindi film adaptation set in Rajasthan, directed by Govind Nihlani.
- 2025: Vais A Volverme Lorca, a musical challenge in the fifth season of Drag Race España

=== Other ===
Other adaptations include:

- 1967: Las Desenamoradas, a ballet adaptation by Eleo Pomare, featuring music by John Coltrane.
- 2000: Bernarda Albas Haus, an opera adaptation by Aribert Reimann.
- 2006: Bernarda Alba, a musical adaptation by Michael John LaChiusa. It opened at Mitzi Newhouse Theater with Phylicia Rashad as Bernarda.

== Sources ==
- Lima, Robert. The Theatre of Garcia Lorca. New York: Las Americas Publishing Co., 1963.
