= Leo Ognall =

British writer (1908–1979)

- Born: June 20, 1908; Montreal, Canada
- Died: April 12, 1979 (aged 70); Leeds, West Yorkshire, England, U.K.
- Occupations: Journalist, author
- Children: 3, including Harry Ognall
- Writing career
- Pen name: Hartley Howard; Harry Carmichael
- Genre: Crime novels
- Notable work: Department K

Leopold Horace Ognall (20 June 1908 – 12 April 1979), known by the pen names Hartley Howard and Harry Carmichael, was a British crime novelist.

== Biography ==
Ognall was born in Montreal, Canada, but grew up in Glasgow, Scotland. His father served as provost of Rutherglen. At age 19, the younger Ognall was working as a bus driver in Rutherglen. He also worked as a journalist before starting his fiction career. He lived in Leeds in England for many years; he was married there in 1932, and while he was recorded as living in Ulverston in Cumbria in 1939, he was again living in Leeds by 1964.

Ognall wrote over 90 novels, which were published between 1951 and 1979. The New York City-based private eye Glenn Bowman, who appeared in 38 books written under the pen name of Hartley Howard, was one of his most successful characters. Under the Harry Carmichael pen name, his primary series characters were John Piper, an insurance assessor, and Quinn, a crime reporter; the London-based duo appeared together in 32 books. Ognall created the pseudonym "Harry Carmichael" as an amalgam of the names of his immediate family: his son Harry, his wife Cecilia, his daughter Margaret, and his son Michael. Ognall's 1964 spy thriller Department K was adapted into the 1968 British film Assignment K. Some of his works were also adapted for radio.

Ognall married Ceclia Sumroy (1909–1994) in 1932 in Leeds. The couple had three children, including Sir Harry Ognall, a barrister and judge who was well known for his prosecution of Peter Sutcliffe, dubbed the Yorkshire Ripper.

Ognall died in 1979, aged 70, in Leeds. His final book, The Sealed Envelope, was published posthumously later that year.

== Bibliography ==
=== Hartley Howard works ===
As Hartley Howard, Ognall authored the following novels (with year of publication):

1. The Last Appointment 1951
2. The Last Deception 1951
3. Death of Cecilia 1952
4. The Last Vanity 1951
5. Bowman Strikes Again 1953
6. The Other Side of the Door 1953
7. Bowman at a Venture 1954
8. Bowman on Broadway 1954
9. No Target for Bowman 1955
10. Sleep for the Wicked 1955
11. The Bowman Touch 1956
12. A Hearse for Cinderella 1956
13. Key to the Morgue 1957
14. The Long Night 1957
15. The Big Snatch 1958
16. Sleep, My Pretty One 1958
17. The Armitage Secret 1959
18. Deadline 1959
19. Extortion 1960
20. Fall Guy 1960
21. I'm No Hero 1961
22. Time Bomb 1961
23. Count-Down 1962
24. Double Finesse 1962
25. The Stretton Case 1963
26. Department K (US title: Assignment K) 1964
27. Out of the Fire 1965
28. Counterfeit 1966
29. Portrait of a Beautiful Harlot 1966
30. Routine Investigation 1967
31. The Eye of the Hurricane 1968
32. The Secret of Simon Cornell 1969
33. Cry on My Shoulder 1970
34. Room 37 1970
35. Million Dollar Snapshot 1971
36. Murder One 1971
37. Epitaph for Joanna 1972
38. Nice Day for a Funeral 1972
39. Highway to Murder 1973
40. Dead Drunk 1974
41. Treble Cross 1975
42. Payoff 1976
43. One-Way Ticket 1978
44. The Sealed Envelope 1979

=== Harry Carmichael works ===
As Harry Carmichael, Ognall authored the following novels (with year of publication):

1. Death Leaves a Diary 1952
2. The Vanishing Trick 1952
3. Deadly Night-Cap 1953
4. School for Murder 1953
5. Why Kill Johnny? 1954
6. Death Counts Three (US title: The Screaming Rabbit) 1954
7. Money for Murder 1955
8. Noose for a Lady 1955
9. The Dead of Night 1956
10. Justice Enough 1956
11. Emergency Exit 1957
12. Put Out That Star (US title: Into Thin Air) 1957
13. James Knowland: Deceased 1958
14. A Question of Time 1958
15. ...Or Be He Dead 1959
16. Stranglehold (US title: Marked Man) 1959
17. Requiem for Charles (US title: The Late Unlamented) 1960
18. The Seeds of Hate 1960
19. Alibi 1961
20. Confession 1961
21. The Link 1962
22. Of Unsound Mind 1962
23. Vendetta 1963
24. Flashback (Note: Flashback appears to be based on the 1961 disappearance of Joan Risch, per a 1964 newspaper interview with Ognall, and subsequent reviews of the book.) 1964
25. Safe Secret 1964
26. Post Mortem 1965
27. Suicide Clause 1966
28. The Condemned 1967
29. Murder by Proxy 1967
30. A Slightly Bitter Taste 1968
31. Death Trap 1970
32. Remote Control 1970
33. Most Deadly Hate 1971
34. The Quiet Woman 1971
35. Naked to the Grave 1972
36. Candles for the Dead 1973
37. Too Late for Tears 1973
38. The Motive 1974
39. False Evidence 1976
40. A Grave for Two 1977
41. Life Cycle 1978
