= Nuts in May (novel) =

1964 novel by Richard Gordon

- First edition
- Author: Richard Gordon
- Language: English
- Genre: Comedy
- Publisher: Heinemann
- Publication date: 1964
- Publication place: United Kingdom
- Media type: Print

Nuts in May is a 1964 comedy novel by the British writer Richard Gordon, best known for writing the Doctor series.

When his son Teddy is sent down from Oxford University and breaks off his engagement to a wealthy young woman, the publisher Algernon Brickwood attempts to take him in hand.

== Bibliography ==
- Peacock, Scott. Contemporary Authors. Cengage Gale, 2002.
