= Gareth Thompson =

UK author

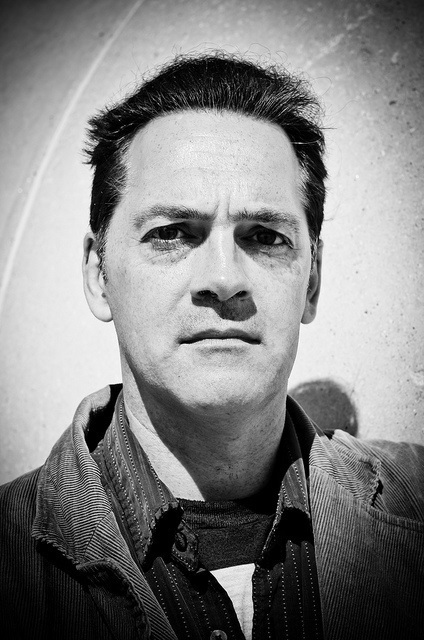
- Author Gareth Thompson
- Born: 25 September 1964 (age 60)
- Occupation: Author
- Years active: 2006-present
- Website: www.gareththompson.co.uk

Gareth Thompson is an author who lives in Kendal, United Kingdom.

== Early life and career ==
Thompson obtained a degree in journalism at the London College of Printing and later worked for the trade magazine Music Week. He was also Deputy Editor of the theatre website Whatsonstage.com. He has worked with endangered sea turtles on Crete, and performed street music in Cuba, as well as directing arts for adults with learning difficulties. He also worked for the charity OXFAM. On returning to Cumbria he began writing his first novel, while assisting a local junior school with reading and drama groups. A scheme for new writers in Cumbria, promoted by North West Arts, gained him a connection with Man Booker-listed novelist John Murray, who helped develop his work. He was also a major contributor to 1001 Albums You Must Hear Before You Die published by Cassell/Quarto.

== Books ==
=== The Great Harlequin Grim (2006) ===
Published by Random House Children's Books in, it portrays the bond of friendship between a teenage lad, and Harlequin—a 'boy-giant' who lives rough in an abandoned shack, disguising himself with clown's make up and an old hat. The novel was nominated for the Branford Boase Award.

=== Sunshine to the Sunless (2008) ===
Thompson's second book, Sunshine to the Sunless, was nominated for the Carnegie Medal and the UK Literacy Award. Set in Millom, it narrates the early life of tormented teenager Andrew Kindness, who witnessed a terrible tragedy on the local estuary. The Guardian described this work as 'drawing together the romantic landscape of the poets with the tensions of contemporary Cumbria'.

=== The Anarchist's Angel (2009) ===
Thompson's third book again depicts the difficulties inherent in modern village life, as viewed by a scarred and unorthodox loner named Samson Ashburner.

== The Sea Swallow (2011) ==
This 64-page illustrated book tells the story of Mary, the daughter of a fisherman who has been killed at sea. Mary must go on a perilous journey to a secret valley below the waves, in order to save her hometown from being swallowed by the ocean. The graphics in the book were created by Totnes artist Hannah Megee. The Sea Swallow was written as part of a Mythic Coastline project, designed to draw visitors back to the Lancashire coast and connect communities. This will be further achieved through dramatic performances and major public art works.
