= Minerva Mena =

Mexican actress and university professor

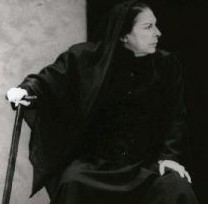
Minerva Mena performing in La casa de Bernarda Alba

Minerva Mena Peña (Note: In this Mexican name, the surname is Mena and the second or maternal family name is Peña.) (September 11, 1930 – December 10, 2004) was a Mexican actress and university professor. She was a founding teacher of the Faculty of Performing Arts at the Autonomous University of Nuevo León and was active in the world of theater in the state of Nuevo León.

== Early life ==
Mena was born in Monterrey on September 11, 1930, the daughter of Jesús Mena Gutiérrez and Felisa Peña Martínez, who formed the musical comedy duo Mena-Peña, performing zarzuela and operetta. They were itinerant variety singers, announcers, and pioneers of radio entertainment in Monterrey, Nuevo León, where they settled in the mid-1930s. She had two older brothers, Raúl Rubén, a director and choreographer especially of musical revues, and Jesús Daniel, a set designer and visual artist in Monterrey; the two sometimes collaborated. Mena's parents set up a variety tent called "Carpa México" on Calzada Madero in Monterrey, which burned down a couple of times. After these financial setbacks, her parents decided to leave the business and seek a stable income as announcers and commercial singers on local radio.

Her first studies were with a teacher who was an actor with the zarzuela company. Mena's early theatrical performances were playing child roles in the shows her parents produced, alongside her brothers. At the age of 11, she enrolled in a dance academy, and her dream was to become a classical ballet dancer, but after her father died in a car accident, she accepted a position offered by the same dance school to teach newly admitted students. During her childhood and early youth, she played roles in theater, radio dramas, and made radio commercials.

== Adult career ==
At the age of 16, she choreographed a student musical revue at the then-University of Nuevo León. She later acted, directed, and worked on makeup and costume design. She also participated in dance, radio, film, and television. She had a role in the first Mexican soap opera, Agonía de amar ("The Agony of Loving"), produced in Monterrey. She gained the most recognition in character roles and in the title role in Federico García Lorca's play The House of Bernarda Alba.

She ventured into production alongside architect Refugio Luis Barragán, her husband at the time. The two purchased a theater they named the Teatro Mayo and dedicated it to experimental productions.

She was the founding teacher at the School of Performing Arts at the Autonomous University of Nuevo León (UANL), where she worked as a lecturer in the specialization of Biomechanics and Corporal Expression until her retirement in 1996. On June 11, 2009, through a tribute paid by the UANL, one of the classrooms at the Faculty of Performing Arts was named after her and a commemorative plaque was installed.

== Personal life ==
In 1966, she married Barragán. In the 1970s, the couple separated and later divorced. They had three children: Marcela (1966–2024), José Luis (1969), and Gabriela Guadalupe (1972–2025).

On December 10, 2004, Mena died in Monterrey after suffering from a cerebral embolism for nine months. Her death occurred four days after that of her ex-husband.

== Awards and recognition ==
- Best actress medal – Fifth Regional Mexican Theatre Contest (V Concurso Regional de Teatro Mexicano), 1959
- Revelation of the Year, El Heraldo de México newspaper, 1965.
- Public Recognition for Civic Merit, Presea Estado de Nuevo León, 1990 (theater category)
- UANL Arts Award, 1991 (as an actress).
- Recognition – Tribute, CONARTE, CONACULTA, INBA, UANL, 2000

Mena is the subject of the book Conversaciones con Minerva Mena by Hernando S. Garza Lozano.

== External links (photographic record) ==
- "Memoria Universitaria No. 109 / Febrero 2019". Memoria Universitaria. Boletín del Centro de Documentación y Archivo Histórico de la UANL (in Spanish). 10 (109). Universidad Autónoma de Nuevo León: 11. February 2019.
- Festival Internacional Cervantino 1981
