= Doctor at Large (novel) =

1955 novel by Richard Gordon

- First edition
- Author: Richard Gordon
- Language: English
- Series: Doctor series
- Genre: Comedy
- Publisher: Michael Joseph
- Publication date: 1955
- Publication place: United Kingdom
- Media type: Print
- Preceded by: Doctor at Sea
- Followed by: Doctor in Love

Doctor at Large is a 1955 comedy novel by the British writer Richard Gordon. It is the third entry in the Doctor series of novels.

== Adaptation ==
In 1957 it was made into a British film of the same title directed by Ralph Thomas and starring Dirk Bogarde, Donald Sinden, Muriel Pavlow and James Robertson Justice.

== Bibliography ==
- Goble, Alan. The Complete Index to Literary Sources in Film. Walter de Gruyter, 1999.
- Pringle, David. Imaginary People: A Who's who of Fictional Characters from the Eighteenth Century to the Present Day. Scolar Press, 1996.
