= A Little Learning (book) =

1964 book by Evelyn Waugh

- First edition cover
- Author: Evelyn Waugh
- Illustrator: Evelyn Waugh
- Language: English
- Genre: Satire
- Publisher: Chapman and Hall
- Publication date: 1964
- Publication place: United Kingdom

A Little Learning: The First Volume of an Autobiography (1964) is Evelyn Waugh's unfinished autobiography. It was published just two years before his death on Easter Sunday, 1966, and covers the period of his youth and education. The title is a well-known quotation from Pope's An Essay on Criticism, "A little learning is a dang'rous thing".
