= Doctor (novel series) =

Series of novels by Richard Gordon

The Doctor novels are a series of 19 comic novels by British physician Richard Gordon, covering the antics of a group of young doctors. They were published between 1952 and 1999.

== Novels ==
1. Doctor in the House. London: Michael Joseph. 1952.
2. Doctor at Sea. London: Michael Joseph. 1953.
3. Doctor at Large. London: Michael Joseph. 1955.
4. Doctor in Love. London: Michael Joseph. 1957.
5. Doctor and Son. London: Michael Joseph. 1959.
6. Doctor in Clover. London: Michael Joseph. 1960.
7. Doctor on Toast. London: Michael Joseph. 1961.
8. Doctor in the Swim. London: Michael Joseph. 1962.
9. Love and Sir Lancelot. Heinemann. 1965.
10. The Summer of Sir Lancelot. Heinemann. 1965
11. Doctor on the Boil. Heinemann. 1970.
12. Doctor on the Brain. Heinemann. 1972.
13. Doctor in the Nude. Heinemann. 1973.
14. Doctor on the Job. Heinemann. 1976.
15. Doctor in the Nest. Heinemann. 1979.
16. Doctor's Daughters. Heinemann. 1981.
17. Doctor on the Ball. 1985.
18. Doctor in the Soup. 1986.
19. The Last of Sir Lancelot. 1999.

== Adaptations ==
=== Films ===
The seven Doctor films were developed from the books, directed by Ralph Thomas and produced by Betty Box. The early films featured Dirk Bogarde in the lead as Doctor Sparrow and Donald Sinden as Benskin. Later films starred Leslie Phillips. The first film came in 1954 and the last in 1970.

=== Television series ===
The films inspired in turn to seven different Doctor television series between 1969 and 1991, totalling 157 thirty-minute episodes:

- Doctor in the House, which first ran on ITV from July 1969 to July 1970, with a total of 26 thirty-minute episodes.
- Doctor at Large, which first ran on ITV from February to September 1971, with a total of 29 thirty-minute episodes.
- Doctor in Charge, which first ran on ITV from April 1972 to December 1973, with a total of 43 thirty-minute episodes.
- Doctor at Sea, which first ran on ITV from April to July 1974, with a total of 13 thirty-minute episodes.
- Doctor on the Go, which first ran on ITV from April 1975 to April 1977, with a total of 26 thirty-minute episodes.
- Doctor Down Under, which first ran on Australian Channel Seven from February to May 1979, with a total of 13 thirty-minute episodes.
- Doctor at the Top, which first ran on BBC 1 from February to April 1991, with a total of 7 thirty-minute episodes.

=== Radio series ===
- Doctor in the House, a 13 part BBC Radio 4 adaptation began in September 1968, starring Richard Briers as Simon Sparrow and Geoffrey Sumner as Sir Lancelot Spratt.
- Doctor at Large, a 13 part BBC Radio 4 series started in June 1969, with Briers and Sumner reprising their roles.

== See also ==
- Dr. Kildare, an American dramatic comedy series of novels, films, and serialized radio and television programs.
- List of fictional doctors
