= Department K =

1964 novel

- First edition
- Author: Hartley Howard
- Language: English
- Genre: Spy thriller
- Publisher: Collins
- Publication date: 1964
- Publication place: United Kingdom
- Media type: Print

Department K is a 1964 spy thriller novel by Hartley Howard, a pen name of British author Leo Ognall. It was published in the United States under the alternative title Assignment K.

== Critical reception ==
The Evening Standard deemed it "a fine, pace-holding thriller." The Evening Herald considered it "a rough-action thriller with an interest-holding, exciting plot."

== Film adaptation ==
In 1968, the novel was adapted into the film Assignment K, directed by Val Guest and starring Stephen Boyd, Camilla Sparv and Michael Redgrave. While the book was mostly centred in London over a few days, the film opens this out by including more Continental settings and shifting from the novel's Berlin to Munich.

== Sources ==
- Burton, Alan. Looking-Glass Wars: Spies on British Screens since 1960. Vernon Press, 2018.
- Goble, Alan. The Complete Index to Literary Sources in Film. Walter de Gruyter, 1999.
