= A Right to Die =

1964 novel by Rex Stout

- Author: Rex Stout
- Cover artist: Bill English
- Language: English
- Series: Nero Wolfe
- Genre: Detective fiction
- Publisher: Viking Press
- Publication date: October 22, 1964
- Publication place: United States
- Media type: Print (hardcover)
- Pages: 182 pp. (first edition)
- OCLC: 2304765
- Preceded by: Trio for Blunt Instruments
- Followed by: The Doorbell Rang

A Right to Die is a Nero Wolfe detective novel by Rex Stout, first published by the Viking Press in 1964.

== Plot summary ==
The novel is set against the background of the Civil Rights Act conflict during the early Johnson Administration. At the beginning of the book, Paul Whipple, a black character from the earlier novel Too Many Cooks (1938), whose trust Wolfe had gained against a strong West Virginia atmosphere of prejudice, tells Wolfe that Wolfe has since become his hero, and that he has also achieved his dream, stated in the earlier novel, of becoming an anthropologist. He has come, however, to draw upon the favor he did Wolfe 26 years earlier, by asking Wolfe to prevent his son Dunbar Whipple (Note: Paul was a waiter at the Kanawha Spa resort in West Virginia when he and Wolfe first met. In that story, the none-too-friendly county sheriff has already questioned Paul and several other black restaurant staff and learned nothing. Wolfe attempts to convince them that he has quite a different opinion of black men than the sheriff, but has little success until he quotes cogently from the work of noted early Black-American poet Paul Laurence Dunbar. Paul, an anthropology student at Howard University, recognized the work. That act of respect for Black-American culture convinces Paul and his buddies that Wolfe is no sweet-talking trickster more polite than the sheriff but with the same racist agenda. Paul and his buddies reward Wolfe's respect with some key information, and Paul has immortalized the incident by naming his future son – now a young man – "Dunbar" in joint honor of both Wolfe and the poet.) from marrying a rich white girl, Susan Brooke, with whom he is apparently in love. While claiming that he is not opposed, in principle at least, to mixed-race couples, Paul Whipple thinks that sensible rich white girls do not fall in love with poor black men, even if the rich white girl is working for a black civil rights organization in New York, the Rights of Citizens Committee. Wolfe is loath to interfere in the matter, but agrees to at least learn what he can about the true motivations of the socialite girlfriend and why she would be interested in a Negro boyfriend, to settle the debt he owes Whipple. Before the real mystery story gets underway, Stout allows some give and take on the concept of racism being a two-way street: blacks preferring their own as much as whites.

Archie arranges a meeting with Susan Brooke through his girlfriend, Lily Rowan, but is unable to form a conclusion as to her motives. Wolfe has him fly to Racine, Wisconsin, Susan's hometown, to do research on her background. He discovers little except for an incident where a man who wanted to marry her, Richard Ault, shot himself on her front porch after she turned him down. He is doing more research when Wolfe suddenly calls him back to New York: Susan Brooke has been brutally murdered in her Harlem apartment.

Dunbar Whipple is the prime suspect in the murder, and Wolfe agrees to work on his behalf. Wolfe focuses his investigation on Dunbar and Susan's co-workers at the Rights of Citizens Committee, over the objections of Whipple's lawyer Harold Oster, who is also the ROCC's counsel. Those interviewed include the organization's founder Thomas Henchly, Susan's superior Cass Faison, Rae Kallmann and Maud Jordan, two white volunteers, and Beth Tiger, a black stenographer Archie takes immediate interest in. Susan's family is also interviewed, and it becomes apparent that they are bigots who consider her involvement with Civil Rights a "kink" and do not believe she could have been engaged to Dunbar. Her sister-in-law Dolly is particularly vitriolic and Archie takes an instant dislike to her. The family claims that Susan was actually engaged to a white car dealer named Peter Vaughn.

Saul Panzer discovers that Dolly Brooke lied about her alibi the night of the murder by interviewing a garage attendant who saw her take her car out an hour before the murder took place. They cannot prove it because the witness refuses to testify, but stumble upon a lucky break when Vaughn, riddled with guilt, confesses to Archie that he lied to the police to firm up Dolly's alibi. Wolfe and Archie confront Mrs. Brooke, who admits that she went to Susan's apartment, but she could not get in because no one answered her knock. This indicates that Susan was already dead at 8:45, long before Dunbar Whipple arrived at the apartment. Her evidence clears him, but Wolfe elects not to use it because that would not only endanger Vaughn but would complicate matters by destroying the lead he has on the police.

Several days later, Vaughn calls Archie, telling him that he may have more information but that he has to do some checking on it first. The next day he is found dead, shot multiple times. When it emerges that Vaughn went to the ROCC the day before for information on Susan and Dunbar, Wolfe brings the key players to his office for another interview to prevent their being arrested as material witnesses. It is during this interview that Wolfe realizes that the key to the case lies in the unusual frequency of a diphthong in the names of those involved. It will take another trip to the Midwest for Archie, this time to Evansville, Indiana, before the case is solved.

The use of Paul Whipple as a character in a 1964 Nero Wolfe novel was problematic, since Rex Stout never allowed his recurring characters to age. Whipple was a young man in Too Many Cooks, but had aged 26 years and was a middle-aged academic in A Right to Die. In all this time, Nero Wolfe and Archie Goodwin miraculously remained the same age, but Whipple never noticed or mentioned this oddity.

== Civil rights ==
As noted earlier, Rex Stout had already had Nero Wolfe make civil rights a central issue in his 1938 Wolfe novel Too Many Cooks, although in that case his client was a not a black man, and so while many books were being written in that time period about the civil rights of Black Americans, few mainstream authors were writing a civil-rights sequel to a novel from 1938.

== Reviews and commentary ==
- Jacques Barzun and Wendell Hertig Taylor, A Catalogue of Crime — Archie bestirs himself in Louisville and Evansville on the trail of a murderer whose identity is suggested to Nero by the abnormal frequency of a certain diphthong. How timely all this is is shown by the fact that Wolfe's client is a black whose son is about to marry a white girl, and by the nature of Wolfe's light reading: Science, the Glorious Entertainment.

== Publication history ==
- 1964, New York: The Viking Press, October 22, 1964, hardcover

In his limited-edition pamphlet, Collecting Mystery Fiction #10, Rex Stout's Nero Wolfe Part II, Otto Penzler describes the first edition of A Right to Die: "Blue boards, blue cloth spine; front cover printed with dark blue; spine printed with black; rear cover blank. Issued in a blue, red, black, and white dust wrapper."
In April 2006, Firsts: The Book Collector's Magazine estimated that the first edition of A Right to Die had a value of between $150 and $300. The estimate is for a copy in very good to fine condition in a like dustjacket.

- 1964, Toronto: Macmillan, 1964, hardcover
- 1965, New York: Viking (Mystery Guild), January 1965, hardcover

The far less valuable Viking book club edition may be distinguished from the first edition in three ways:

- The dust jacket has "Book Club Edition" printed on the inside front flap, and the price is absent (first editions may be price clipped if they were given as gifts).
- Book club editions are sometimes thinner and always taller (usually a quarter of an inch) than first editions.
- Book club editions are bound in cardboard, and first editions are bound in cloth (or have at least a cloth spine).

- 1965, London: Collins Crime Club, April 12, 1965, hardcover
- 1965, New York: Bantam #F-3061, December 1965, paperback
- 1966, London: Fontana #1389, 1966, paperback
- 1991, New York: Bantam Crimeline ISBN 0-553-24032-3 April 1, 1991, paperback
- 2003, Auburn, California: The Audio Partners Publishing Corp., Mystery Masters ISBN 1-57270-315-6 May 2003, audio CD (unabridged, read by Michael Prichard)
- 2010, New York: Bantam Crimeline ISBN 978-0-307-75614-5 May 26, 2010, e-book
