= Richard Gordon (English author) =

English author (1921–2017)

- Photo by Susan Greenhill
- Born: Gordon Stanley Ostlere; 15 September 1921
- Died: 11 August 2017 (aged 95)
- Education: Selwyn College, Cambridge
- Occupations: Ship's surgeon, anaesthetist, and writer
- Known for: Doctor series of novels

Richard Gordon (born Gordon Stanley Benton, 15 September 1921 – 11 August 2017, also known as Gordon Stanley Ostlere), was an English ship's surgeon and anaesthetist. As Richard Gordon, Ostlere wrote numerous novels, screenplays for film and television and accounts of popular history, mostly dealing with the practice of medicine. He was best known for a long series of comic novels on a medical theme beginning with Doctor in the House, and the subsequent film, television, radio and stage adaptations. His The Alarming History of Medicine was published in 1993, and he followed this with The Alarming History of Sex.

== Life and work ==
Gordon was born in Paddington, London. He studied at Selwyn College, Cambridge, and worked as an anaesthetist at St. Bartholomew's Hospital (where he had been a medical student) and later as a ship's surgeon and as assistant editor of the British Medical Journal. He published several technical books under his own name, including Anaesthetics for Medical Students (1949), later published as Ostlere and Bryce-Smith's Anaesthetics for Medical Students in 1989; Anaesthetics and the Patient (1949), and Trichlorethylene Anaesthesia (1953). He left medical practice in 1952, and took up writing full-time. The early Doctor novels, set in the fictitious St. Swithin's, a teaching hospital in London, were witty and apparently autobiographical; later books included more sexual innuendo and farce. The novels were successful in Britain in Penguin paperback during the 1960s and 1970s. Gordon also contributed articles to Punch magazine, and published books on medicine, gardening, fishing and cricket.

The film adaptation of Doctor in the House (1954) was released two years after the book's publication. He had an uncredited role as an anaesthetist in the film. Doctor at Sea came out the following year, with Brigitte Bardot in the cast. Dirk Bogarde starred as Dr. Simon Sparrow in both. The later spin-off TV series were written by British comedy writers. In 1974, he walked off the set of This is Your Life when Eamonn Andrews appeared with the red book. He later changed his mind and the show was transmitted a week later.

== Personal life and death ==
Gordon's wife Mary Ostlere was also a physician, and the couple had four children, and nine grandchildren. Two of his children also became doctors. He lived in Bromley, Kent (Now the London Borough of Bromley) and died in Hospital on 11 August 2017 after suffering a stroke.

== Partial bibliography ==
- Doctor in the House. London: Joseph, 1952
- Doctor at Sea. London: Joseph, 1953
- The Captain's Table. London: Joseph, 1954
- Doctor at Large. London: Joseph, 1955
- Doctor in Love. London. Joseph, 1957
- Doctor and Son. London: Joseph, 1959
- Doctor in Clover. London: Joseph, 1960
- Doctor on Toast. London: Joseph, 1961
- Doctor in the Swim. London: Joseph, 1962
- The Summer of Sir Lancelot. Heinemann, 1963
- Love and Sir Lancelot. Heinemann, 1965
- Doctor on the Boil. Heinemann, 1970
- Doctor on the Brain. Heinemann, 1972
- Doctor in the Nude. Heinemann, 1973
- Doctor on the Job. Heinemann, 1976
- Doctor in the Nest. Heinemann, 1979
- Doctors' Daughters. Heinemann, 1981
- Doctor on the Ball. Hutchinson, 1985
- Doctor in the Soup. Century, 1986
- The Last of Sir Lancelot. Hale, 1999
- Nuts in May. Heinemann, 1964
- The Facemaker. Heinemann, 1967
- Surgeon at Arms. Heinemann, 1968
- The Facts of Life. Heinemann, 1969
- The Medical Witness. Heinemann, 1971
- The Sleep of Life. Heinemann, 1975
- The Invisible Victory. Heinemann, 1977
- The Private Life of Florence Nightingale. Heinemann, 1978
- The Private Life of Jack the Ripper. Heinemann, 1980
- The Private Life of Doctor Crippen. Heinemann, 1981
- Dr. Gordon's Casebook (diary). Severn House, 1982 ISBN 0727808389
- Great Medical Disasters, Hutchinson, 1983 ISBN 0091522307
- Great Medical Mysteries. Hutchinson, 1984 ISBN 0091556600
- The Bulldog and the Bear: A Play in Two Acts. Samuel French, 1984 ISBN 0573619085
- The Alarming History of Medicine, Sinclair-Stevenson, 1993 ISBN 1856192229
- The Literary Companion to Medicine: An Anthology of Prose and Poetry, Sinclair-Stevenson, 1993 ISBN 1856193357
- An Alarming History of Famous and Difficult Patients. St. Martin's Press, 1997 ISBN 0312150482
