= Sea of Sand =

1958 British film by Guy Green

- British film poster
- Directed by: Guy Green
- Written by: Robert Westerby
- Based on: Original story Sean Fielding
- Produced by: Robert S Baker & Monty Berman
- Starring: Michael Craig; John Gregson; Richard Attenborough
- Cinematography: Wilkie Cooper
- Edited by: Gordon Pilkington
- Music by: Clifton Parker
- Production company: A Tempean Film
- Distributed by: Rank Organisation
- Release date: 7 November 1958 (UK)
- Running time: 97 minutes
- Country: United Kingdom
- Language: English
- Budget: £125,000

Sea of Sand (released in the US as Desert Patrol) is a 1958 British war film starring Richard Attenborough, John Gregson and Michael Craig. Directed by Guy Green, it concerns a patrol of the Long Range Desert Group (LRDG) during the North African Campaign in the Second World War. It was shot on location in the Kingdom of Libya.

== Plot ==
On the eve of the Battle of El Alamein, Captain Tim Cotton leads a patrol on a raid to destroy a German fuel dump located deep behind enemy lines. Captain Williams of the Royal Engineers is posted to Cotton's patrol to deal with a minefield surrounding a German petrol dump. As a regular soldier, Williams takes time to adjust to the non-regulation way the LRDG operates. He finds a girl's torn up picture in Cotton's billet, who dismisses her as "old news". Later on Williams shows Cotton a picture of his son; Cotton says he has everything to live for.

The mission, which begins with five Chevrolet 30 cwt trucks, starts with a perilous journey through Axis-occupied Libya where the LRDG encounter Luftwaffe spotter planes and Africa Korps patrols. Six of their men are killed and two of their Chevrolets are destroyed by a German armoured car. On reaching the German supply depot, Williams does his job and creates a path through the minefield with the help of Corporal Mathieson. The rest of the group destroys the stocks of petrol but Sergeant Hardy is killed in the escape. However hidden within the dump is a large number of German panzers. Unfortunately Cotton cannot report this to base because the radio is smashed in a German ambush, during which 'Blanco' White is badly wounded in the leg.

Knowing the importance of the information, the group knows they must return and report it to base while there is time for it to be acted upon. During their return journey they are relentlessly pursued by a German officer determined to stop them. When two half-tracks attack them Cotton is wounded in the arm and Sergeant Nesbitt, the New Zealander, is killed. Eventually - with just 40 miles to go to the Allied base - the last truck runs out of fuel. Blanco volunteers to stay behind and man a Vickers machine gun, Brody offers to stay with his friend but Cotton says "Everyone who can goes on", as this will increase the chance of the important information they possess getting back to base. While the others head towards base, Blanco sacrifices himself slowing up the last pursuing German halftrack.

The group, with their water exhausted, sight another LRDG patrol on a truck. But before they can signal them, the chasing Germans are spotted. Williams grabs a Sten gun and leads the Germans away from his group. His actions allow the LRDG patrol to outflank and destroy the half-track; however, he is killed. Cotton laments that he had everything to live for.

The film concludes with Cotton reporting the tanks to his CO back at base. They also speak of Williams and the sacrifice he made for the group. The opening barrage of El Alamein starts.

== Cast ==
- Michael Craig as Captain Tim Cotton
- John Gregson as Captain Bill Williams R.E.
- Richard Attenborough as Trooper Brody
- Percy Herbert as Corporal "Blanco" White
- Barry Foster as Corporal Matheson
- Vincent Ball as Sergeant Nesbitt
- Andrew Faulds as Sergeant Parker
- George Murcell as Corporal Simms
- Ray McAnally as Sergeant Hardy
- Harold Goodwin as Road Watch
- Tony Thawnton as Captain Tom
- Wolf Frees as German Sergeant
- George Mikell as German Officer
- Martin Benson as German Half-track Officer (uncredited)
- Dermot Walsh as Commanding Officer (uncredited)

== Production ==
=== Writing ===
Producers Monty Berman and Bob Baker ran Tempean Films which specialised in "B" pictures. They wanted to make a film about the Long Range Desert Group and commissioned Sean Fielding, who knew Berman in the war, to do a story. The script was then written by author and screenwriter Robert Westerby. The film's technical advisor was Bill Kennedy Shaw, who served as the LRDG's intelligence officer during the North African Campaign.

The film was originally going to be made through George Minter of Renown as part of a four-picture slate. However Tempean succeeded in raising finance from the Rank Organisation. "We had made a few films by then but nothing of that scale," said Berman.

Michael Craig and John Gregson were loaned from Rank to make the film. Richard Attenborough was also cast in what he called "a minor variation on the same bloody character I seemed condemned to play forever."

Guy Green liked the script and said the producers "wanted to shoot it in the studio with a pile of sand, but I said I didn't think I could do that, so we shot it in Libya at a time when the king still held sway."

=== Soundtrack ===
The score was by Clifton Parker and was performed by the Sinfonia of London under the musical direction of Muir Mathieson.

=== Filming ===
The film was entirely shot on location over eight weeks. It was shot in Tripolitania, near to many sites that saw real action during the war in North Africa.

Michael Craig said "we drank far too much, slept far too little and misbehaved in every possible way." Filming began 12 May 1958.

Guy Green said although he had to struggle against "the penny pinching outfit", the film "came out well."

Most of the European extras in the film were British Army personnel who were stationed in Libya because of the military alliance between King Idris of Libya and the West (this relationship ended following the 1969 coup d'etat by army officers led by Muammar Gaddafi). As such, most of the military props used in the film are derived from British or American equipment. For instance, the Allied troops use contemporary Chevrolet 30 cwt WB trucks mounted with Vickers machine guns. However, the use of Sten submachine guns was incorrect (the real LRDG used either the .303 SMLE or the Thompson submachine gun as small arms). Likewise, American half-tracks, fitted with British Bren guns, were employed to portray Africa Korps Sd.Kfz. 251s.

Vincent Ball recalled "I think we had six of the worst old army trucks in North Africa; half the time they were being towed past the cameras, even though they’d had new engines fitted. But it was probably one of the best locations I’ve ever been on, staying at the Imperial Hotel by the sea. It was pretty rough filming in the desert but we played poker, drank a lot of beer, and swam."

Craig later wrote in his memoirs that although he thought it was a good film and a good part, he felt the British film industry should be making more contemporary stories instead of continually making war films. He discussed this with Richard Attenborough and mentioned a story; Attenborough, who had just formed a company with Bryan Forbes, was intrigued, and asked Craig to write it up - this became the film The Angry Silence, directed by Guy Green.

== Reception ==
=== Awards ===
The film was nominated for BAFTA awards for Best Film and British Film and Best British Actor for Michael Craig.

=== Critical ===
Variety praised the "excellent all-round acting and taut direction by Guy Green," and concluded, "Green and cameraman Wilkie Cooper splendidly capture the remote loneliness of the vast desert, the heat, the boredom and the sense of pending danger. The screenplay is predictable, but the dialog is reasonably natural and the various characters are well drawn."

Filmink called it "a solid guys-on-a-mission flick... a decent movie, well directed by Guy Green, part of the late ‘50s desert-sploitation war cycle (The Black Tent, Ice Cold in Alex, No Time to Die)."

=== Box Office ===
Kinematograph Weekly listed it as being "in the money" at the British box office in 1958. "It was a very patriotic film and it came at the right time," said Berman.

== Notes ==
- McFarlane, Brian (1997). An autobiography of British cinema : as told by the filmmakers and actors who made it.
