= John Gregson =

English actor (1919–1975)

- John Gregson (top) with Dinah Sheridan, Kenneth More and Kay Kendall, pictured in Genevieve
- Born: Harold Thomas Gregson; 15 March 1919; Liverpool, England
- Died: 8 January 1975 (aged 55); Porlock Weir, Somerset, England
- Occupation: Actor
- Years active: 1945–1975
- Spouse: Thea Gregory (m. 1947)
- Children: 6 (3 daughters, 3 sons)

Harold Thomas Gregson (15 March 1919 – 8 January 1975), known professionally as John Gregson, was an English actor of stage, television and film, with 40 credited film roles. He was best known for his crime drama and comedy roles.

Gregson was credited in 40 films between 1948 and 1971, and on television from 1960 until his death. He was often cast as a police inspector or as a navy or army officer, or in comedy roles in British films. Filmink magazine called him "a very under-rated star of this period."

== Biography ==
=== Early life and military service ===
Born in Liverpool of Irish descent, Gregson grew up in the city's Wavertree area, where he was educated at Greenbank Road Primary School and later at St Francis Xavier's College, Liverpool. He left school at 16, working first for a telephone company, then for Liverpool Corporation, as the city council was then known, before the Second World War. During this time, Gregson became interested in amateur dramatics, joining first the local Catholic church theatre group at St Anthony's in Mossley Hill.

When war broke out, Gregson was called up and joined the Royal Navy as a sailor on minesweepers. At one point, his minesweeper was torpedoed and he was rescued from the sea with a knee injury.

=== Early post-war career ===
After being demobilised in 1945, Gregson joined the Liverpool Playhouse for a year, before going on to Perth Theatre in Scotland. There he met his future wife, actress Ida Reddish from Nottingham (at the time using the stage name Thea Kronberg, though she later became Thea Gregory) who had recently arrived from the Birmingham Repertory Theatre. They moved to London in 1947, and married in Hampstead. The couple eventually had three daughters and three sons. Gregson appeared alongside Alec Guinness in the play The Human Touch in the West End. He also starred in Roger MacDougall's comedy Macadam and Eve and later enjoyed success in Hugh Hastings's play Seagulls Over Sorrento at the Apollo Theatre.

One of Gregson's first screen appearances was in the film Saraband for Dead Lovers (1948), a tearjerking romance starring Joan Greenwood and Stewart Granger. In the popular Scott of the Antarctic (also 1948) he played Tom Crean.

Gregson could also be seen in Ealing's Whisky Galore! (1949) and Train of Events (1949), as well as The Hasty Heart (1949), Cairo Road (1950), Treasure Island (1950) and The Lavender Hill Mob (1951). He had a lead role in Angels One Five (1951), a war film.

He was promoted to leading man for The Brave Don't Cry (1952), about a mining disaster. Gregson had the second lead in Rank's Venetian Bird and supported in The Holly and the Ivy (both 1952). He also had a leading role in another Ealing comedy, The Titfield Thunderbolt (1953). His performance in Venetian Bird led to him being offered a long-term contract by the Rank Organisation.

=== Stardom ===
Gregson became a star when cast in the comedy Genevieve (1953), which also starred Kenneth More, Dinah Sheridan and Kay Kendall. It was the second-most popular film of the year in Britain. Gregson tested for the role of the missionary in Miss Sadie Thompson but the role went to Jose Ferrer.

He was second-billed to Glynis Johns in a prison drama, The Weak and the Wicked (1954), another hit, and played the lead in a light drama, Conflict of Wings (1954). He was loaned to Adelphi Films for The Crowded Day (1954). He followed this with To Dorothy a Son (1954), a comedy co-starring Shelley Winters; and Three Cases of Murder (1955), an omnibus film co-starring Orson Welles.

Gregson had a big hit with a war film, Above Us the Waves (1956), playing an Australian, in support of John Mills. He did a comedy with Diana Dors, Value for Money, and a drama Jacqueline (both 1956). More successful was another war movie based on a true story, The Battle of the River Plate (1956) in which Gregson played F. S. Bell. This film helped British exhibitors vote him the eighth-biggest British film star in the country for 1956.

He followed it with True as a Turtle (1957), a comedy that attempted to repeat the success of Genevieve, only in a yacht, but it was not a success. Neither was Miracle in Soho (1957), a drama. That year he was the fourth-biggest British star. The following year he was eighth, his last year in the top ten; his films included Rooney (1958), a comedy in which he played an Irish sportsman; Sea of Sand (1958), a war film; and The Captain's Table (1959) a comedy. After making Rooney he ended his contract with Rank.

Gregson supported in SOS Pacific and Hand in Hand (both 1960), but was top-billed in Faces in the Dark (1960) and The Frightened City (1961). He had a support role in The Treasure of Monte Cristo (1961) and was one of many names in The Longest Day (1962). Gregson's final film roles of note were Live Now – Pay Later (1962) and Tomorrow at Ten (1962).

=== Later career ===
Gregson's film career faded after ten good years from 1952 to 1962. He was one of many leading men and women of the 1950s (the others including Kenneth More, Richard Todd, Patrick Holt, Michael Craig, Sylvia Syms and Muriel Pavlow) who struggled to maintain their status as leads beyond the early 1960s. From 1963 onwards, Gregson never played another leading film role.

Gregson also worked on TV. In Ivor Brown's BBC TV play William's Other Anne he played William Shakespeare revisiting his first girlfriend Anne Whateley. TV work became increasingly important to him from the mid-60s. He starred as Commander George Gideon in the 26 episodes of the series Gideon's Way (1964–66) (known as Gideon C.I.D. in America). He also appeared in The Saint with Roger Moore and a popular comedy adventure series with Shirley MacLaine, Shirley's World. He took over from Kenneth More in long-running TV adverts for coffee on British television. Gregson appeared in It's the Geography That Counts, the last play at the St James's Theatre before its closure and demolition in 1957.

== Death ==
In January 1975, Gregson died suddenly from a heart attack near Porlock Weir, Somerset, aged 55, whilst on holiday, walking on the path to St. Beuno's Church, Culbone. He left a widow, Thea Gregory, and six children.

Gregson's final television role was in the Southern Television serial Dangerous Knowledge, which was broadcast posthumously in 1976. His body was interred at Sunbury Cemetery, Sunbury-on-Thames, Surrey near his family home at Creek House, Chertsey Road, Shepperton. He left £64,917 and died intestate.

== Complete filmography ==
- London Belongs to Me (1948) – (uncredited)
- Saraband for Dead Lovers (1948) – (uncredited)
- Scott of the Antarctic (1948) – P.O. T. Crean R.N.
- Whisky Galore! (1949) – Sammy MacCodrun
- Train of Events (1949) – Malcolm Murray-Bruce (segment "The Composer")
- The Hasty Heart (1949) – Raw recruit in jungle (uncredited)
- Cairo Road (1950) – Coast Guardsman
- Treasure Island (1950) – Redruth
- The Lavender Hill Mob (1951) – Farrow
- Angels One Five (1952) – Pilot Officer 'Septic' Baird
- The Brave Don't Cry (1952) – John Cameron
- Venetian Bird (1952) – Renzo Uccello
- The Holly and the Ivy (1952) – David Paterson
- The Titfield Thunderbolt (1953) – Gordon
- Captain Brassbound's Conversion (1953 TV movie) – Captain Brassbound
- Genevieve (1953) – Alan McKim
- The Weak and the Wicked (1954) – Dr. Michael Hale
- Conflict of Wings (1954) – Cpl. Bill Morris
- The Crowded Day (1954) – Leslie
- To Dorothy a Son (1954) – Tony Rapallo
- Three Cases of Murder (1955) – Edgar Curtain ("You Killed Elizabeth" segment)
- Above Us the Waves (1955) – Lt Alec Duffy
- Value for Money (1955) – Chayley Broadbent
- Jacqueline (1956) – Mike McNeil
- The Battle of the River Plate (1956) – Captain Bell – H.M.S. Exeter
- True as a Turtle (1957) – Tony Hudson
- Miracle in Soho (1957) – Michael Morgan
- Ill Met by Moonlight (1957) – Sailor – (uncredited)
- Rooney (1958) – James Ignatius Rooney
- Sea of Sand (1958) – Capt. Williams
- The Captain's Table (1959) – Capt. Albert Ebbs
- SOS Pacific (1959) – Jack Bennett
- Hand in Hand (1960) – Father Timothy
- Faces in the Dark (1960) – Richard Hammond
- The Frightened City (1961) – Det. Insp. Sayers
- The Treasure of Monte Cristo (1961) – Renato
- The Longest Day (1962) – British Padre, Parachute Regiment – searching for his Communion Set
- Live Now – Pay Later (1962) – Callendar
- Tomorrow at Ten (1962) – Detective Chief Inspector Parnell
- The Night of the Generals (1967) – Colonel Sandauer
- Hans Brinker (1969 TV movie) – Mijnheer Brinker
- Speaking of Murder (1971 TV movie) – Charles Ashton
- Fright (1971) – Dr. Cordell

== Box office rankings ==
For several years British exhibitors listed Gregson as one of the most popular local stars at the box office.

- 1956 – 9th most popular British star
- 1957 – 4th most popular British star (7th overall)
- 1958 – 8th
