= The Gentle Gunman =

1952 film

- Directed by: Basil Dearden
- Written by: Roger MacDougall
- Based on: The Gentle Gunman by Roger MacDougall
- Produced by: Basil Dean; Michael Relph
- Starring: John Mills; Dirk Bogarde; Elizabeth Sellars; Robert Beatty
- Cinematography: Gordon Dines
- Edited by: Peter Tanner
- Music by: John Greenwood
- Production company: Ealing Studios
- Distributed by: General Film Distributors
- Release dates: October 1952 (UK); 30 September 1953 (U.S.)
- Running time: 86 minutes
- Country: United Kingdom
- Language: English

The Gentle Gunman is a 1952 British drama film directed by Basil Dearden and starring John Mills, Dirk Bogarde and Elizabeth Sellars. It was written by Roger MacDougall based on his 1950 play of the same title that was televised by the BBC in September 1950. It was produced by Ealing Studios. The film's sets were designed by the art director Jim Morahan.

== Plot ==
Terence and Matthew Sullivan are two IRA men in London during World War II. Terry starts questioning the worth of the IRA's war against the United Kingdom that involves planting bombs in a crowded London Underground station and becomes marked for death by the IRA. In addition to Terry's questioning of the IRA's methods, Matt is affected by a mother whose husband and son had joined the IRA with fatal results. Though Matthew escapes capture in London, his comrades-in-arms Connolly and Patsy are captured by the British police. Both Terry and the IRA leader Shinto vow to free the men and take them from their trial in Belfast to safety in the Irish Free State, but Shinto favours more violent methods than Terry.

== Cast ==
- John Mills as Terence Sullivan
- Dirk Bogarde as Matt Sullivan
- Robert Beatty as Shinto
- Elizabeth Sellars as Maureen Fagan
- Barbara Mullen as Molly Fagan
- Eddie Byrne as Flynn
- Joseph Tomelty as Dr Brannigan
- Gilbert Harding as Henry Truethome
- James Kenney as Johnny Fagan
- Liam Redmond as Connolly
- Michael Golden as Murphy
- Jack MacGowran as Patsy McGuire
- Terence Alexander as ship's officer (uncredited)
- Patric Doonan as sentry (uncredited)

== Critical reception ==
The Monthly Film Bulletin wrote: "The Gentle Gunman does not suffer from such familiar weaknesses of filmed theatre as restricted sets and excessive dialogue; rather, the stage original has been broken down so that climaxes come at moments of violence, and the flavour of the picture is primarily that of a thriller. But in spite of this the film retains a certain theatrical artificiality, notably in the last scenes, and the insistence on action has itself resulted in a scrappy organisation of the material and in a dissipation and lack of force in the presentation of the central theme."

Time Out stated the film was "stiff" and "overplotted".

Philip Kemp of the British Film Institute thought the film struggled to "find the right tone" and culminated with a "car-crash of an ending".

The New York Times indicated that the film had "failed to search beneath the surface" of the screen-play and described much of the content as "superficial".
