= To Dorothy, a Son =

1950 play

- Original language: English
- Written by: Roger MacDougall
- Genre: Comedy
- Setting: A cottage in Surrey, present day

Premiere
- Date: 11 September 1950
- Place: Theatre Royal, Nottingham

To Dorothy, a Son is a 1950 comedy play by the British writer Roger MacDougall. The plot revolves around a complex inheritance in which the American ex-wife of a man tries to prevent his current pregnant wife giving birth before a certain day, in order that she can claim the money.

It premiered at the Theatre Royal, Nottingham before it transferred to London's West End where it ran for 515 performances between 23 November 1950 and 16 February 1952 initially at the Savoy Theatre before moving to the Garrick Theatre. The original London cast included Richard Attenborough, Sheila Sim, Yolande Donlan and Gwenda Wilson. A 1951 Broadway version at the John Golden Theatre, with adaptations by Otis Bigelow and a cast that included Ronald Howard and Glynis Johns, lasted for just 8 performances.

It was revived in 1976 with Leslie Phillips and Hilary Pritchard in the cast.

== Film adaptation ==
In 1954 it was made into the film To Dorothy a Son directed by Muriel Box and starring Shelley Winters, John Gregson and Peggy Cummins.

== Bibliography ==
- Goble, Alan. The Complete Index to Literary Sources in Film. Walter de Gruyter, 1999.
- Wearing, J.P. The London Stage 1950-1959: A Calendar of Productions, Performers, and Personnel. Rowman & Littlefield, 2014.
