= Natasha Gregson Wagner =

American actress (born 1970)

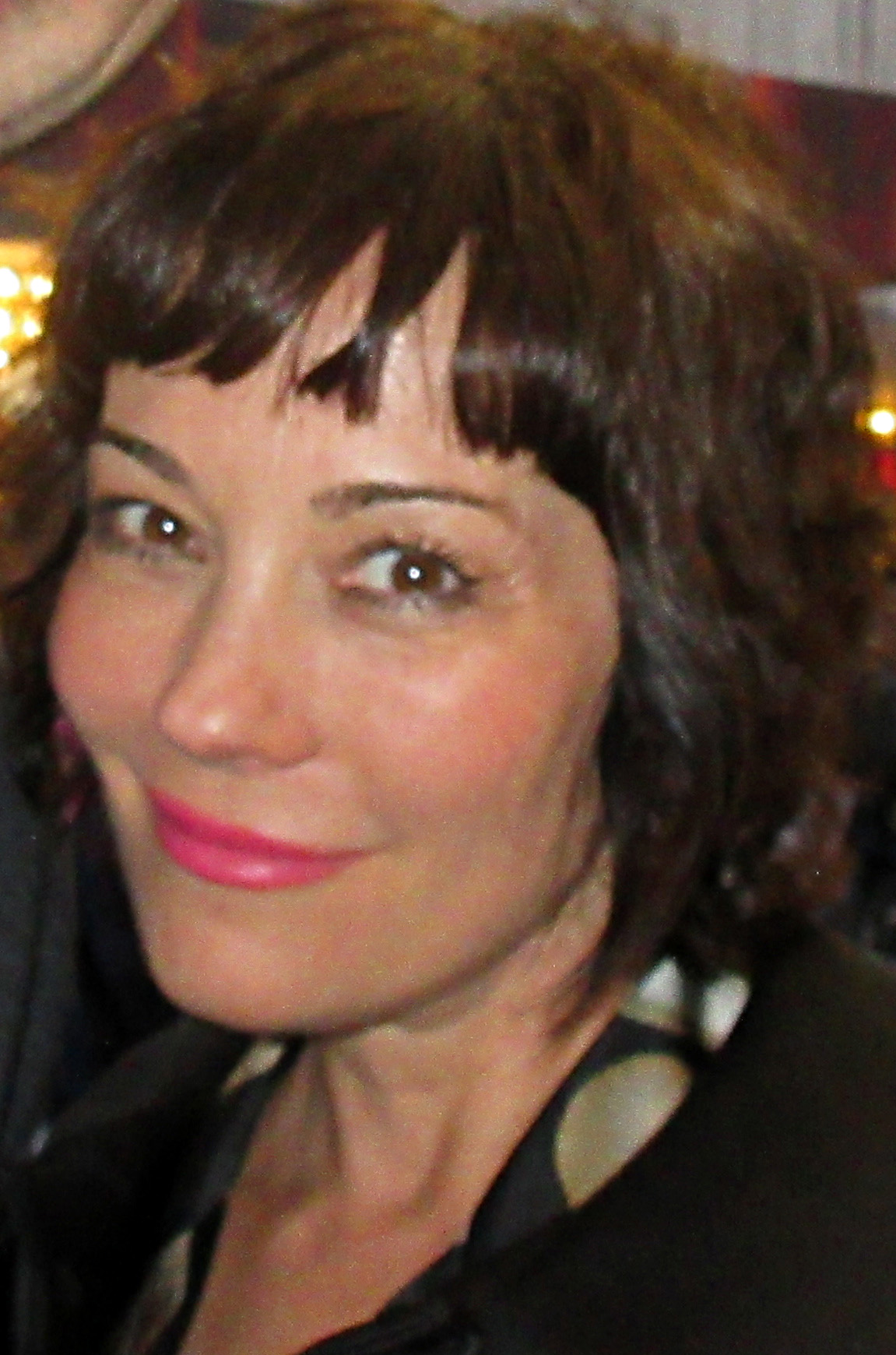
- Gregson Wagner in 2018
- Born: Natasha Gregson; September 29, 1970 (age 55); Los Angeles, California, U.S.
- Occupation: Actress
- Years active: 1992–present
- Spouses: D.V. DeVincentis (m. 2003; div. 2008); Barry Watson (m. 2014)
- Children: 1
- Parents: Richard Gregson; Natalie Wood
- Relatives: Lana Wood (maternal aunt); Michael Craig (paternal uncle); Jessica Gregson (paternal first cousin); Reginald Hanson (great-great grandfather); Julia Gregson (stepmother); Robert Wagner (stepfather); Jill St. John (stepmother); Katie Wagner (stepsister)

Natasha Gregson Wagner (née Gregson; born September 29, 1970) is an American actress. She is the daughter of film producer Richard Gregson and actress Natalie Wood. She has appeared in films including Lost Highway, Two Girls and a Guy, First Love, Last Rites (all 1997), Urban Legend, Another Day in Paradise (both 1998) and High Fidelity (2000).

== Early life ==
Gregson Wagner was born Natasha Gregson in Los Angeles to American actress Natalie Wood and British producer Richard Gregson. Her godmother was actress Ruth Gordon. Her parents separated when she was ten months old, and later divorced. After Wood remarried actor Robert Wagner in 1972, she added Wagner to Gregson's surname, though he never legally adopted her. Gregson Wagner's aunt, with whom she has no contact, is actress and producer Lana Wood. Through her father, she is a cousin of author Jessica Gregson, niece of actor Michael Craig, stepdaughter of journalist Julia Gregson and great-great granddaughter of Reginald Hanson, former Lord Mayor of London. She is distantly related by marriage to baseball player Tim Lincecum on her mother's side.

On November 29, 1981, Natalie Wood drowned near Santa Catalina Island. After her mother's death, Gregson Wagner and her half-sister were raised in California by Robert Wagner and actress Jill St. John.

Gregson Wagner attended Crossroads School in Santa Monica. She went on to Emerson College and later transferred to the University of Southern California. She left in 1992 to pursue an acting career.

== Career ==
Gregson Wagner's first film role was as Lisa in the 1992 crime drama film Fathers & Sons. She then had a small role in the movie Buffy the Vampire Slayer. Following that film she starred in several TV movies including Modern Vampires, Hefner: Unauthorized, and The Shaggy Dog. In 1995, she starred with her stepfather Robert Wagner in a Hart to Hart TV movie. She starred in the Wes Craven horror film Mind Ripper. In 1996, she co-starred with Jon Lovitz and Tia Carrere in the comedy High School High. She played Lou in the 1997 film Two Girls and a Guy. Gregson Wagner played a small role in the 1998 thriller Urban Legend. That same year she guest starred in an episode of Ally McBeal and co-starred with Vincent Kartheiser, James Woods and Melanie Griffith in Larry Clark's crime drama Another Day in Paradise. To avoid an NC-17 rating, a rough sex scene with Kartheiser had to be removed from the theatrical version.

In 2000, Gregson Wagner had roles in Stranger Than Fiction, and High Fidelity opposite John Cusack. In 2001, she was regular cast member in the short-lived prime time soap opera, Pasadena. In 2003, she played Barbara Richardson in the movie Wonderland. In 2004, she had a role in the Hallmark movie, Angel in the Family playing the part of Beth. In 2005 Gregson Wagner guest-starred on Cold Case and Medium. In 2006, she starred in two episodes of ER: "Bloodline" and "21 Guns". From 2005 to 2007, she had a recurring role on the TV show The 4400 as April Skouris, the sister of NTAC agent Diana Skouris. In 2008, she guest starred on CSI: Crime Scene Investigation and House M.D.

In 2020, Gregson Wagner produced the documentary film Natalie Wood: What Remains Behind, directed by Laurent Bouzereau.

== Personal life ==
From 1990 to 1997, Gregson Wagner dated Josh Evans, son of Ali MacGraw and Robert Evans. She was married to screenwriter D.V. DeVincentis from October 2003 to January 2008.

On May 30, 2012, Gregson Wagner and actor Barry Watson had a daughter who is the only grandchild of Natalie Wood. The couple married in December 2014.

== Filmography ==
=== Film ===
Year	Title	Role	Notes
1992	Fathers & Sons	Lisa	
1992	Dark Horse	Martha	
1992	Buffy the Vampire Slayer	Cassandra	
1994	Molly & Gina	Gina	
1994	Dead Beat	Kirsten	
1994	S.F.W.	Kristen	
1995	Mind Ripper	Wendy Stockton	
1996	The Method	Kelly	
1996	High School High	Julie Rubels	
1997	Lost Highway	Sheila	
1997	Quiet Days in Hollywood	Kathy	
1997	Two Girls and a Guy	Lou	
1997	First Love, Last Rites	Sissel	
1997	Glam	Vanessa Mason	
1997	Dogtown	Sara Ruth Van Horn	
1998	Another Day in Paradise	Rosie	
1998	Urban Legend	Michelle Mancini	
1998	Modern Vampires	Nico	
2000	Stranger than Fiction	Violet Madison	
2000	High Fidelity	Caroline Fortis	
2001	The Medicine Show	Lynn Piegi	
2002	Vampires: Los Muertos	Zoey	
2002	The Gray in Between	Julie	
2003	Sol Goode	Brenda	
2003	Wonderland	Barbara Richardson	
2004	How Did It Feel?	Maggie	
2011	Deep Blue Breath	The Mother	Short film
2012	A Kiss and a Promise	Samantha Beck	
2014	Vkus Ameriki	Irina	
2015	Anesthesia	Marta	
2016	Search Engines	Georgia	
2016	Thirty Nine	Tabatha	
2020	Natalie Wood: What Remains Behind	Herself	Documentary film; also producer

=== Television ===
Year	Title	Role	Notes
1993	Tainted Blood	Lissa Drew	Television film
1993	The Substitute	Jenny	Television film
1994	Birdland	Angie	Episode: Pilot
1994	Dragstrip Girl	Laura Bickford	Television film
1994	The Shaggy Dog	Allison	Television film
1995	Hart to Hart: Secrets of the Hart	Tibby	Television film
1998	Ally McBeal	Hannah Puck	Episode: "Story of Love"
1999	Chicago Hope	Dr. Sally Gates	Episode: "Curing Cancer"
1999	Hefner: Unauthorized	Bobbie Arnstein	Television film
2001–2002	Pasadena	Beth Greeley	Main role
2002	Night Visions	Sydney	Episode: "Switch"
2004	Angel in the Family	Beth	Television film
2005	Medium	Beverly Waller	Episode: "Time Out of Mind"
2005	Cold Case	Carmen Hayes in 1954	Episode: "Committed"
2005–2007	The 4400	April Skouris	Recurring role
2006	The Accidental Witness	Christine Sternwald	Television film
2006	ER	Mary Warner	Episode: "Twenty-One Guns", "Bloodline"
2007	State of Mind	Sonoma	Episode: "Snow Melts"
2008	Skip Tracer	Dolly Colbert	Television film
2008	CSI: Crime Scene Investigation	Cody Cook	Episode: "Grissom's Divine Comedy"
2008	House	Sandra	Episode: "Last Resort"
2010	The Closer	Cherie Walker	Episode: "The Big Bang"
2017	Date My Dad	Stephanie's friend	Episode: "Moving On"
