= Julia Gregson =

English writer (born 1947)

- Born: 1947 (age 78–79); London
- Occupation: Novelist
- Spouses: Unknown spouse (m. 1966; div. 1972) Richard Gregson (m. 1984; died 2019)
- Children: 1
- Relatives: Natasha Gregson Wagner (stepdaughter); Michael Craig (brother-in-law); Jessica Gregson (niece)
- Writing career
- Language: English
- Period: 2004 – present
- Genre: Historical fiction
- Notable works: Jasmine Nights; Band of Angels; East of the Sun
- Notable awards: Literary Review Short Story Award (1990); Prince Maurice Prize for Literary Love Stories (2009); Romantic Novel of the Year (2009)
- Website: juliagregson.net

Julia Gregson (born 1947) is a British writer of short stories and novels. Her first published short story won Ryman's Literary Review Short story award. In 2009, her novel East of the Sun won the Prince Maurice Prize for Literary Love stories, and the Romantic Novel of the Year Award by the Romantic Novelists' Association.

== Biography ==
=== Personal life ===
At age 19, Gregson married an equally young academic who worked at Sydney University. The marriage ended in divorce after six years.

She began dating producer/writer Richard Gregson in the late 1970s, and the couple married in 1984. Together they had one daughter, Poppy. She has four stepchildren from her husband's previous marriages, including actress Natasha Gregson Wagner.

Widowed since 2019, Gregson lives in Monmouthshire, Wales.

=== Career ===
Julia Gregson was a journalist for Sungravure Magazines in Australia before becoming a foreign correspondent in the United States. She went on assignments to Vietnam, India and Mexico. She started writing short-stories before publishing her first novel in 2004.

== Bibliography ==
- The Water Horse (2004) aka Band of Angels (US title)
- East of the Sun (2008)
- Jasmine Nights (2012)
- Crossing Borders (2014)
- Monsoon Summer (2016)
