= Richard Gregson =

British agent, film producer and screenwriter (1930–2019)

- Born: Richard John Gregson; 5 May 1930; Poona, British India
- Died: 21 August 2019 (aged 89); Whitebrook, Monmouthshire, Wales
- Occupations: Talent agent; film producer; screenwriter
- Spouses: Sally Ronaldson (m. 1958; div. 1967) Natalie Wood (m. 1969; div. 1972) Julia Gregson (m. 1984)
- Children: 5, including Natasha
- Relatives: Michael Craig (brother); Jessica Gregson (niece); Reginald Hanson (great-grandfather); Barry Watson (son-in-law)

Richard John Gregson (5 May 1930 – 21 August 2019) was a British talent agent, film producer and screenwriter.

== Career ==
Gregson spent his early career working in America, alongside stars such as Robert Redford, Julie Christie, Alan Bates and Gene Hackman and director John Schlesinger. He married the American actress Natalie Wood on 30 May 1969. The couple filed for divorce on 4 August 1971, and the divorce was finalised in April of the following year. Together they had one child, the actress Natasha Gregson Wagner, born 1970.

Gregson was nominated for the Academy Award for Best Original Screenplay at the 33rd Academy Awards for his work on The Angry Silence with his elder brother, Michael Craig, and Bryan Forbes.

Among his clients were Joe Janni, John Schlesinger, and Alan Bates.

== Personal life ==
He was born in India to Violet Hanson, a granddaughter of Reginald Hanson, who was Lord Mayor of London from 1886 to 1887, and her second husband, Captain Donald Gregson, formerly of the 3rd Indian Cavalry. In 1933, his uncle, Charlie Hanson, drowned somewhat questionably in the River Thames. Gregson's parents divorced in 1944 and his mother remarried; she died in 1999 at the age of 100.

In 2012, he published a memoir titled Behind the Screen Door: Tales from the Hollywood Hills.

Gregson had three children – Sarah, Charlotte and Hugo – by his first wife, Sally, whom he divorced in 1967. He had a daughter, Natasha, by his second wife, Natalie Wood. He was married to the British author Julia Gregson from 1984 until his death in 2019. The couple had one daughter, Poppy.

On 21 August 2019, his daughter, Natasha Gregson Wagner, announced his death from Parkinson's disease in Wales, on her mother's tribute Instagram account, also sharing a photo of him and her together taken earlier in the year. He was 89 years old.

== Select credits ==
- The Angry Silence (1960) – co-writer
- Downhill Racer (1969) – producer
