= To Dorothy a Son =

1954 film

- U.S. half sheet poster
- Directed by: Muriel Box
- Written by: Peter Rogers
- Based on: To Dorothy, a Son by Roger MacDougall
- Produced by: Peter Rogers; Ben Schrift
- Starring: Shelley Winters; John Gregson; Peggy Cummins; Wilfrid Hyde-White
- Cinematography: Ernest Steward; H. A. R. Thomson
- Edited by: Alfred Roome
- Music by: Lambert Williamson
- Production company: Welbeck Films
- Distributed by: Independent Film Distributors
- Release date: 29 November 1954
- Running time: 81 minutes
- Country: United Kingdom
- Language: English
- Box office: £104,557 (UK)

To Dorothy a Son (U.S. title: Cash on Delivery) is a black and white 1954 British comedy film in the form of a farce directed by Muriel Box and starring Shelley Winters, John Gregson and Peggy Cummins. It was written by Peter Rogers based on the 1950 play To Dorothy, a Son by Roger MacDougall. It was distributed in America by RKO Pictures in January 1956.

== Premise ==
Tony Rapallo, a composer, is married (or so he thinks) and his wife Dorothy is pregnant and expecting their child. All is thrown into confusion when his first wife Myrtle appears from America claiming that they are still married. However, her motivation is not to get Tony back, but to ensure she is the recipient of a $2 million inheritance from her New Yorker uncle, Uncle Joe. His will states that if a son is born to Tony before 9 am on a certain day, then the son will inherit the money; if not, then Myrtle inherits all. Myrtle therefore hopes the birth will be after 9 am.

It gets more complicated when the lawyer explains Tony and Myrtle were never legally married in the first place, because they were married in Tonga and although they thought they had been there 7 days they had only been there six days due to the International Date Line and therefore fell short of the minimum stay before marriage was permitted.

When the crucial 9 am passes, she celebrates, but Tony is more concerned about the baby. However, he suddenly realises the will meant 9 am New York time, which is five hours ahead. With 15 minutes to go and Myrtle in tow, a baby starts to cry. After brief celebration, it seems it is a girl so Myrtle still gets the money, but it is twins and the second child born with seconds to go is a boy. Tony offers Myrtle half the money, which she accepts. When she calls her boyfriend, he says the relevant time is actually 10am not 9am, because they are on Summer Time, so Myrtle is entitled to all the money. She decides to give Tony half.

== Cast ==
- Shelley Winters as Myrtle La Mar
- John Gregson as Tony Rapallo
- Peggy Cummins as Dorothy Rapallo
- Wilfrid Hyde-White as Mr Starke the lawyer
- Mona Washbourne as Cymbeline Appleby the midwife
- Hal Osmond as Livingstone Potts
- Hartley Power as Cy Daniel
- Maurice Kaufmann as Elmer, Myrtle's boyfriend
- John Warren as waiter
- Fred Berger as furrier
- Dorothy Bramhall as Starke's secretary
- Nicholas Parsons as passport official
- Ronald Adam as Parsons
- Martin Miller as Brodcynsky
- Alfie Bass as cab driver
- Anthony Oliver as Express reporter
- Joan Sims as telephone operator
- Aubrey Mather as Dr. Cameron
- Meredith Edwards as Mr Carter, the landlord
- Campbell Singer as pub landlord
- Joan Hickson as pub landlady
- Marjorie Rhodes as landlady
- Charles Hawtrey as waiter at pub
- Joan Newell as Mrs. Robinson
- Bartlett Mullins as mechanic
- Gudrun Ure as Cy Daniel's secretary
- Grace Denbeigh-Russell as spinster
- Charles Hammond as Express photographer
- John Warren as waiter

== Production ==
The film was independently financed by Sydney Box.

It was shot at Elstree Studios near London with sets designed by the art director George Provis.

== Critical reception ==
The New York Times wrote, "BELIEVE it or not, the running time of a stork determines the heir or heiress to $2,000,000 in Cash on Delivery, a bright, British farce that was fun on delivery at the Little Carnegie yesterday ... Shelley Winters, as Myrtle, is in one of those made-to-order roles. John Gregson, as Tony, and Peggy Cummins, as Dorothy, are fine. And Mona Washbourne makes a delightfully tart nurse. Deliver yourself to the Little Carnegie. You'll have a good time."

The Monthly Film Bulletin wrote: "A stagey film adapted from a stagey play. With the pregnant Dorothy in full view, the joke around which the story revolves seems rather tasteless. ... Direction and playing are rather ponderous, and Shelley Winters flings herself into a part more suitable for Judy Holliday."

Variety wrote: "It plays off in a succession of climaxes, mostly hectic, under the extremely broad direction by Muriel Box. Cast performances are in kind, and moderate chuckles result from the antics and the situations causing them."

Picturegoer wrote: "Witty adaptation of the successful stage farce, which should give you a pleasant, carefree hour and a half's entertainment. But it's still a photographed stage play, with the accent on dialogue, rather than action."

TV Guide described the film as "a time-zone comedy, with Winters leading a British cast to give the film US appeal ... None of it is terribly interesting".
