= Stranger than Fiction (2000 film) =

2000 film by Eric Bross

Stranger Than Fiction
- Directed by: Eric Bross
- Written by: Tim Garrick; Scott Russell
- Produced by: Ram Bergman; Dana Lustig
- Starring: Mackenzie Astin; Natasha Gregson Wagner; Todd Field; Dina Meyer
- Cinematography: Horacio Marquinez
- Edited by: Caroline Ross
- Music by: Larry Seymour
- Release date: 2000
- Running time: 90 minutes
- Country: United States
- Language: English

Stranger Than Fiction is a 2000 comedy-thriller film directed by Eric Bross and starring Mackenzie Astin.

== Plot ==
While waiting for their flight in a bar of an airport, the writer Donovan Miller tells the story of his best-seller to a stranger to kill time. In Salt Lake City; Violet Madison, Austin Walker, Emma Scarlett and Jared Roth are good friends. After going together to a bar, Jared comes wounded to Austin's apartment in the late night and confesses that he is gay and has just killed a man in his apartment. He asks his friends to help him to vanish with the body of the victim. The group agrees, and after many incidents, Violet stresses, jeopardizing the group. When Violet is found, having hanged herself in her house, many secrets are disclosed.

== Cast ==
- Mackenzie Astin as Jared Roth
- Todd Field as Austin Walker / Donovan Miller
- Dina Meyer as Emma Scarlett
- Natasha Gregson Wagner as Violet Madison
- Michael Flynn as Nick
- Steve O'Neill as Porter
- Scott Subiono as Homeless man
- Joe Unger as Bubba
- Frances Bay as Mrs. Steiner
- Robert Lewis as Policeman #1
- K.C. Clyde as Young Man
- Sharron Prince as Newscaster

== Reception ==
On Rotten Tomatoes the film has an approval rating of 38% based on reviews from eight critics.
