= The Angel Makers =

2007 novel by Jessica Gregson

- The Angel Makers
- Author: Jessica Gregson
- Language: English
- Genre: Novel
- Publisher: PaperBooks
- Publication date: June 2007
- Publication place: United Kingdom
- Pages: 304
- ISBN: 978-0-9551094-6-1
- OCLC: 73956072

The Angel Makers is a 2007 novel written by British author Jessica Gregson based on the true story of The Angel Makers of Nagyrév, two Hungarian women who sold arsenic to unhappily married women to kill their husbands. It was published by PaperBooks.

Gregson wrote The Angel Makers while working for the Home Office. While reading an encyclopedia on serial killers, Gregson saw an entry for the story of a group of women in Hungary who turned on their men during World War I.

== Plot summary ==
During World War I, the men of a Hungarian village leave to fight. In their absence, the women form powerful bonds. Their village is made into a camp for Italian prisoners of war and some women fall for these soldiers. When their men return and begin to mistreat them, the women become murderous in their fight to keep their freedom.
