= SOS Pacific =

1959 adventure drama film directed by Guy Green

- Directed by: Guy Green
- Written by: Bryan Forbes (additional scenes and dialogue)
- Screenplay by: Robert Westerby
- Based on: Gilbert Thomas (as Gilbert Travers Thomas) (based on a story by)
- Produced by: Patrick Filmer Sankey; John G. Nasht (as John Nasht)
- Starring: Richard Attenborough; Pier Angeli; John Gregson; Eva Bartok; Eddie Constantine
- Cinematography: Wilkie Cooper
- Edited by: Arthur Stevens
- Music by: Georges Auric
- Color process: Black and white
- Production companies: Sydney Box Associates; Remfield
- Distributed by: Rank Film Distributors
- Release date: 14 October 1959 (UK)
- Running time: 91 minutes
- Country: United Kingdom
- Language: English

SOS Pacific is a 1959 British adventure drama film directed by Guy Green and starring Richard Attenborough, Pier Angeli, John Gregson, Eva Bartok and Eddie Constantine.

== Plot synopsis ==
A flying boat is forced to ditch in the Pacific during a thunderstorm. Aboard are the owner-pilot Jack Bennett, the navigator Willy, the flight attendant Teresa, and six passengers: a policeman, Petersen; his prisoner Mark; Whitey Mullen, a witness against Mark; Dr Strauss, a German scientist; Miss Shaw, a middle-aged Englishwoman; and Maria, a young European woman.

The plane comes down near an island. The navigator has been killed by toxic gas produced when the wrong kind of extinguisher is used on an electrical fire aboard the plane but the others make it to land in two rubber dinghies. Just offshore a fleet of derelict ships is anchored. On the island are two concrete bunkers. In one, a number of goats are tethered. The other, which is lead-lined, contains cameras and measuring instruments. The cameras are trained on a device standing on a smaller island some distance away.

The castaways realise that they are in the middle of an H-Bomb testing range and that a bomb is to be detonated in a few hours.

== Cast ==
- Richard Attenborough as Whitey Mullen
- Pier Angeli as Teresa
- John Gregson as Jack Bennett
- Eva Bartok as Maria
- Eddie Constantine as Mark Reisner
- Jean Anderson as Miss Shaw
- Cec Linder as Willy
- Clifford Evans as Petersen
- Gunnar Möller as Krauss
- Harold Kasket as Monk (as Harold Kaskett)
- Andrew Faulds as sea captain
- Cyril Shaps as Louis
- Tom Bowman as Alberto

== Production ==
The script was originally developed by Joseph Losey and Ben Barzman which Losey called a "melodrama... intended as a warning about the dangers of the bomb and the moral consequences of exploding it." Sydney Box was to produce and Columbia agreed to finance subject to a star agreeing to play the lead. Box sent Losey to meet with Hardy Krüger who was making a film at Cambridge University called Bachelor of Hearts. Kruger agreed to make the film but Box said Columbia would not approve Losey as a director because of the Hollywood blacklist. However Box had a lower budgeted film he could finance, Blind Date, and Losey made that with Kruger instead.

Filming took place at Pinewood Studios with location work over five weeks shot on the Canary Islands. It was one of a number of movies the Rank Organisation financed around this time featuring European stars to appeal to European audiences.

Richard Attenborough called it "a pretty indifferent picture" but he enjoyed working with Pier Angeli so much he invited her to co star in his and Green's next film, The Angry Silence. According to Jean Anderson, Attenborough almost died filming an action sequence which rendered him unconscious.

== Reception ==
Green later said there was "nothing remarkable" about the film.

Filmink called it "a nice surprise: a sort of ‘40s Warner Bros melodrama with a great ticking clock (people stuck on an island where they’re about to set off a nuclear bomb)."
