= Faces in the Dark =

1960 British film by David Eady

- British quad poster
- Directed by: David Eady
- Screenplay by: Ephraim Kogan; John Tully
- Based on: Les Visages de l'ombre by Boileau-Narcejac
- Produced by: Jon Penington
- Starring: John Gregson; Mai Zetterling; John Ireland; Michael Denison
- Cinematography: Ken Hodges
- Edited by: Oswald Hafenrichter
- Music by: Mikis Theodorakis
- Production company: Penington Eady Productions
- Distributed by: Rank Film Distributors
- Release date: 22 November 1960
- Running time: 84 minutes
- Country: United Kingdom
- Language: English

Faces in the Dark is a 1960 black and white British thriller film directed by David Eady and starring John Gregson, Mai Zetterling and John Ireland. The screenplay, by Ephraim Kogan and John Tully, is based on the 1952 novel Les Visages de l'ombre by Boileau-Narcejac.

== Plot ==
Richard Hammond, an aggressive and ambitious business mogul and inventor with little or no time for his wife, friends or family, is blinded in an explosion on the same day that his long-suffering wife had planned to leave him. He becomes bitter at life.

Under protest Richard submits to a month's rest in his Cornwall house but he notices several inconsistencies there. Either he is losing his mind or there is a plot to murder him.

In desperation he runs away wildly and is nearly hit by a train. He wakes up in hospital in France. Unable to convince the doctor of his danger he is taken back into the custody of his wife and after pleading with her to let him live takes matters into his own hands in a dramatic finale.

== Cast ==
- John Gregson as Richard Hammond
- Mai Zetterling as Christiane Hammond
- John Ireland as Max Hammond
- Michael Denison as David Merton
- Tony Wright as Clem
- Nanette Newman as Janet
- Valerie Taylor as Miss Hopkins
- Roland Bartrop as French doctor

== Production ==
The script was rewritten by Mordecai Richler under the pseudonym Ephraim Koganc.

The film was shot at Shepperton Studios with sets designed by the art director Anthony Masters.

It was the last film made by Michael Denison, who called it "best forgotten... rather claptrappy." In his memoirs he described it as "the worst film with which I have been involved."

== Reception ==
=== Critical ===
Kinematograph Weekly wrote: "The opening reel intrigues, but uneven acting and direction, plus erratic continuity, soon divests it of clarity and punch. As for the twist climax, it strikes an ironic note yet leaves the audience, as well as the hero. still in the dark. Very moderate British thriller."

Monthly Film Bulletin said: "Though the central hypothesis of this horrific film – the urgent discovery, lease and furnishing of a house in France so like his own in Cornwall that a blind man couldn't tell the difference – is as far-fetched as anything yet adapted from Boileau and Narcejac, the situation itself is still an inviting one. David Eady's handling is sadly unambitious, however. Instead of using all the resources of the cinema to stress and elaborate the tension, he settles for a prosaic, television style of presentation. The photography is suitably harsh but the camerawork lacks fluidity; the characterisation is properly flat, but so is most of the acting. Only the tombstone incident, and Mai Zetterling’s enigmatic Christiane, have anything like the right Grand Guignol flavour."

The Radio Times wrote: "this tale of blindness and rage should have been a real nail-biter. Sadly, ex-documentary director David Eady simply doesn't have the thriller instinct and throws away countless opportunities to make the tension unbearable."

TV Guide wrote that "The film has some pot-holes, but the chilling climax is smooth as glass."

Allmovie noted: "Although there may be a few minor gaps here and there in the storyline, Faces in the Dark is a suspenseful drama."

Leslie Halliwell said: "Unlikely but watchable puzzler, betrayed by lifeless handing. Hitchcock would have worked wonders with such a plot."

Filmink called it "a creepy, quite atmospheric movie" although felt Gregson was "miscast".

=== Box office ===
The movie appears to have not been a commercial success. It was released on a double bill with The Boatmen and in December 1960 Kinematograph Weekly reported the double bill "is experiencing tough going. The films aren't bad of their kind, but, for reasons unknown, the programme's [sic] failed to attract."
