= The Emigrants (miniseries) =

- Written by: Brian Phelan; Charles Stamp; Peter Kenna; Keith Dewhurst
- Directed by: David Giles; Eric Taylor
- Starring: Penne Hackforth-Jones; Brian Deacon; Michael Craig
- Theme music composer: Laurie Lewis
- Countries of origin: Australia; United Kingdom
- Original language: English
- No. of episodes: 4 x 75mins

Production
- Producers: Frank Hatherley; Eric Taylor

Original release
- Network: ABC; BBC
- Release: 15 May 1977 – 1977

The Emigrants is a 1977 Australian-British miniseries about an English family who move to Australia.

== Cast ==
=== Regular ===
- Penne Hackforth-Jones as June Parker
- Brian Deacon as Michael Parker
- Joe Ritchie as William Parker, Sr.
- Michael Craig as Bill Parker
- Sheila Reid as May Parker
- Simon Gipps-Kent as Paul Parker
- Lesley Manville as Janice Parker
- Lance Stewart as Dave
- Terry Camilleri as Angelo

=== Guests ===
- Peter Gwynne as Les Nichols
- Drew Forsythe as Peter
