= A Choice of Kings =

- ITV Play of the Week episode
- Directed by: John Frankau
- Written by: John Mortimer
- Original air date: 11 October 1966
- Running time: 65 minutes

"A Choice of Kings" is a television drama film and stage play by John Mortimer. It was first produced in 1966 in the ITV Play of the Week series, directed by John Frankau, starring Michael Craig.

== Outline ==
The action is set at the court of Edward the Confessor, two years before the Battle of Hastings, and offers an unexpected explanation of the background to the quarrel between Harold Godwinson and William the Conqueror and the Norman invasion of England.

== Production and screenplay ==
The first production, by Rediffusion, was timed to commemorate the 900th anniversary of the Battle of Hastings, fought on 14 October 1066 and was first broadcast on 11 October, in the week of the original battle.

John Mortimer's script was published in Playbill 3 (1966), together with other screenplays by Alan Plater, Ray Jenkins, Ronald Duncan, and Alan Gosling. Having been published, the screenplay is sometimes performed on stage. There was a production by Ampleforth College in 1974.

== Reception ==
A review in the Birmingham Daily Post commented ”John Mortimer's play A Choice of Kings (ITV, Tuesday) was dead as a drama, but half revived by its whimsical touches. The Liverpool Echo drew attention to a minor detail, ”For Harold, as can be seen to-night on ITV in a new John Mortimer play, A Choice of Kings, was vain enough to wear a Diana Dors bob of golden shoulder-length hair.

== Cast ==
- Michael Craig as Harold Godwinson, Earl of Wessex
- Barbara Ewing as Edith Swan-neck, Harold's wife
- Julian Glover as William the Bastard, Duke of Normandy
- Amaryllis Garnett as Judith of Balbec, William's cousin
- Peter Jeffrey as Bishop Odo
- John Bailey as FitzOsbern
- Christopher Guinee as Theobald
- Michael Wennink as Wolfnoth, Harold's younger brother
