= The Gentle Gunman (play) =

1950 play

- Original language: English
- Written by: Roger MacDougall
- Genre: Thriller

Premiere
- Date: 24 July 1950
- Place: Cambridge Arts Theatre, Cambridge

The Gentle Gunman is a 1950 thriller play by the British writer Roger MacDougall. A former IRA gunman attempts to renounce his violent past, as he is now convinced a non-violent approach is best.

It premiered at the Cambridge Arts Theatre before transferring to the Arts Theatre in London's West End where it ran for 31 performances between 2 and 27 August 1950. The original London cast included Henry Hewitt, Robin Bailey, Victor Maddern, Larry Burns, Michael Golden, Harry Towb, Eddie Byrne, Kevin Stoney, Louise Hampton and Maureen Pryor. The production was televised by the BBC in September 1950.

== Adaptation ==
In 1952 it was made into a film of the same title by Ealing Studios, directed by Basil Dearden and starring John Mills, Dirk Bogarde and Elizabeth Sellars.

== Bibliography ==
- Goble, Alan. The Complete Index to Literary Sources in Film. Walter de Gruyter, 1999.
- Wearing, J.P. The London Stage 1950-1959: A Calendar of Productions, Performers, and Personnel. Rowman & Littlefield, 2014.
