= Guy Green (filmmaker) =

English film director and producer (1913–2005)

- Guy Green, 1992
- Born: Guy Mervin Charles Green; 5 November 1913; Frome, Somerset, England
- Died: 15 September 2005 (aged 91); Beverly Hills, California, US
- Occupations: Director; cinematographer; camera operator; screenwriter; producer
- Years active: 1929–1986
- Spouse: Josephine Smith (1948-2005) (His death)
- Awards: Best Cinematography, Black-and-White; 1947 Great Expectations

Guy Mervin Charles Green OBE BSC (5 November 1913 – 15 September 2005) was an English film director, producer, screenwriter, and cinematographer. In 1948, he won an Oscar as cinematographer for the film Great Expectations. In 2002, Green was given a Lifetime Achievement Award by the BAFTA, and, in 2004, he was named an Officer of the Order of the British Empire for his lifetime contributions to British cinema.

== Biography ==
Green was born in Frome, Somerset, England. He began working in film in 1929 and became a noted film cinematographer and a founding member of the British Society of Cinematographers. Green became a full-time director of photography in the mid-1940s, working on such films as David Lean's Oliver Twist in 1948.

About 1955, Green switched to directing, making his first films for Nat Cohen.

Green made some films for the Rank Organisation such as SOS Pacific.

He moved to Hollywood around 1962. In addition to directing A Patch of Blue (1965), Green also wrote and co-produced the film. After his death, his widow Josephine told AP that it was his proudest accomplishment. Among his other films as director are The Angry Silence (1960), The Mark (1961) (nominated for the Palme d'Or at the Cannes Film Festival), Jacqueline Susann's Once Is Not Enough (1975), and The Devil's Advocate (1977).

Green felt his career never recovered from the cancellation of a high profile film in 1969 during pre production.

Green died in his Beverly Hills home from kidney and heart failure, aged 91. In addition to his wife of 57 years, he was survived by his son, Michael; his daughter, Marilyn Feldman; and two grandchildren.

== Works ==
=== Selected filmography ===
- Song of the Plough (1933) aka Country Fair – clapper boy
- Radio Parade of 1935 (1934) – camera operator
- The Limping Man (1936) – camera operator
- The Price of Folly (1937) – camera operator
- Glamorous Night (1937) – camera operator
- The Spell of Amy Nugent (1941) aka Spellbound – camera operator
- Pimpernel Smith (1941) – camera operator
- In Which We Serve (1942) – camera operator
- One of Our Aircraft Is Missing (1942) – camera operator
- Escape to Danger (1943) – cinematographer
- The Way Ahead (1944) aka Immortal Battalion – cinematographer
- This Happy Breed (1944) – camera operator
- The Way to the Stars (1945) – 2nd unit
- Carnival (1946) – cinematographer, writer
- Great Expectations (1946) – cinematographer
- Take My Life (1947) – cinematographer
- Blanche Fury (1948) – cinematographer
- Oliver Twist (1948) – cinematographer
- The Passionate Friends (1949) – cinematographer
- Adam and Evalyn (1949) – cinematographer
- Madeleine (1950) – cinematography
- Night Without Stars (1951) – cinematography
- Captain Horatio Hornblower (1951) – cinematographer
- The Hour of 13 (1952) – cinematographer
- The Story of Robin Hood and His Merrie Men (1952) – cinematographer
- Decameron Nights (1953) – cinematography
- The Beggar's Opera (1953) – cinematography
- Rob Roy: The Highland Rogue (1953) – cinematography
- Cocktails in the Kitchen (1954) – cinematography
- Souls in Conflict (1954) – cinematography
- River Beat (1954) – director
- Postmark for Danger (1955) aka Portrait of Alison – writer, director
- The Warriors (1955) aka The Dark Avenger – cinematography
- I Am a Camera (1955) – cinematography
- Lost (1955) aka Tears for Simon – director
- House of Secrets aka Triple Deception (1956) – director
- Sea of Sand (1958) aka Desert Patrol – director
- The Snorkel (1958) – director
- SOS Pacific (1959)– director
- The Angry Silence (1960) – director
- ITV Play of the Week – episode "Hallelujah Corner" (1961) – writer
- The Mark (1961) – director
- Light in the Piazza (1962) – director
- Diamond Head (1963) – director
- 55 Days at Peking (1963) – director, uncredited
- A Patch of Blue (1965) – director, writer, producer
- Pretty Polly (1967) – director
- The Magus (1968) – director
- A Walk in the Spring Rain (1969) – director
- Luther (1974) – director
- Jacqueline Susann's Once Is Not Enough (1975) – director
- The Devil's Advocate (1977) – director
- The Incredible Journey of Doctor Meg Laurel (1979) (TV movie) – director
- Jennifer: A Woman's Story (1979) (TV movie) – director
- Jimmy B. and Andre (1980) (TV movie) – director
- Inmates: A Love Story (1981) (TV movie) – director
- Isabel's Choice (1981) (TV movie) – director
- Strong Medicine (1987) (TV Movie) – director
