= Macadam and Eve =

1950 play

- Written by: Roger MacDougall
- Original language: English
- Genre: Comedy
- Setting: Tillyfruin, a Scottish resort town, present day.

Premiere
- Date premiered: 7 February 1950
- Place premiered: Q Theatre, London

Macadam and Eve is a comedy play by the British writer Roger MacDougall. Adam arrives in modern Scotland still looking for his Eve.

It premiered at the Q Theatre near Kew Bridge in London before transferring to the Aldwych Theatre in London's West End where it ran for 55 performances between 12 March and 28 April 1951. The original West End cast included John Gregson, John Laurie, Richard Pearson, Sheila Latimer, Beatrice Varley and Patricia Dickson.

In 1956 it was adapted for an episode of the ITV Play of the Week.

== Bibliography ==
- Wearing, J.P. The London Stage 1950-1959: A Calendar of Productions, Performers, and Personnel. Rowman & Littlefield, 2014.
