= Michael Craig (actor) =

Indian-born British retired actor and screenwriter (born 1929)

- Born: Michael Francis Gregson; 27 January 1929 (age 97); Poona, Bombay Presidency, British India (now Pune, Maharashtra, India)
- Occupations: Actor; screenwriter
- Years active: 1949–2023
- Spouse(s): Babette Collier (m. 1955, divorced) Sue Walker
- Children: 3; including Jessica Gregson
- Relatives: Richard Gregson (brother); Natasha Gregson Wagner (niece); Reginald Hanson (great-grandfather); Julia Gregson (sister-in-law)

Michael Francis Gregson (born 27 January 1929), known professionally as Michael Craig, is an Indian-born British retired actor and screenwriter, known for his work in theatre, film and television both in the United Kingdom and in Australia.

== Biography ==
Craig was born in Poona, Bombay Presidency, British India, the son of Donald Gregson, who served in the 3rd Indian Cavalry as a captain. He was the elder brother of film producer and screenwriter Richard Gregson.

== Acting career ==
=== Stage ===
Craig began his entertainment career in the theatre. His first job was as an assistant stage manager at the Castle Theatre, Farnham, England in 1950. His stage credits include A Whistle in the Dark (Apollo Theatre, 1961), Wars of the Roses (RSC at Stratford 1963–64), Funny Girl (with Barbra Streisand at the Prince of Wales Theatre 1966), Pinter's The Homecoming (Music Box Theatre, Broadway 1966–67) and the lead role in Trying in Australia in 2007 and at the Finborough Theatre, London, in 2009.

=== Screen ===
Craig made his film debut in a non-speaking part, as an uncredited extra in the 1949 film Passport to Pimlico. He was then talent-spotted at the Oxford Playhouse and gained his first speaking part in an uncredited role in Malta Story (1953). He gained his first credited role the following year in 1954, in The Embezzler. Groomed as a star by the Rank Organisation, he appeared in a number of films, including Campbell's Kingdom (1957), Sea of Sand (1958), The Silent Enemy (1958), Sapphire (1959), Doctor in Love (1960), Cone of Silence (1960), Mysterious Island (1961), The Iron Maiden (1962), A Choice of Kings, Modesty Blaise (1966), Turkey Shoot (1982), Ride a Wild Pony (1975) and Appointment with Death (1988). He received a BAFTA Best actor nomination for his performance in Sea of Sand (1958).

In October 1956, John Davis, managing director of Rank, announced him as one of the actors under contract that Davis thought would become an international star. Filmink argued the success of Doctor in Love "vindicated Rank’s loyalty to Michael Craig over the years – the studio had given him numerous leading roles for little box office return, but still held on to him even after they jettisoned other back-up Bogardes like Patrick McGoohan and Ronald Lewis, and Craig turned down roles in films like The Gentleman and the Gypsy."

Craig's television credits include Arthur of the Britons (1973), The Emigrants (1976), Rush (1976), The Danedyke Mystery (1979), The Professionals (1980), Shoestring (1980), The Timeless Land (1980), Triangle (1981–83), Tales of the Unexpected (1982), Robin of Sherwood (1986), Doctor Who (in the serial Terror of the Vervoids 1986), the Australian series G.P. (1989–95), Brides of Christ (1991), Grass Roots (2000) and Always Greener (2003). He was the subject of an hour-long interview on his life and career recorded for and broadcast on Talking Pictures TV in 2018.

== Scriptwriting credits ==
Craig's scriptwriting credits include the ABC-TV trilogy The Fourth Wish (1974), which starred John Meillon in an award-winning performance as the father of a dying boy. Craig also wrote the screenplay for the feature film The Fourth Wish (1976), which was produced following the success of the television series. Alongside his co-writers, Richard Gregson (his brother) and Bryan Forbes, Craig was nominated for an Academy Award for the screenplay of The Angry Silence (1960).

== Personal life ==
Craig's first wife was Babette Collier. His second is the Australian actress Sue Walker. He is the father of Jessica Gregson; his brother was the film producer Richard Gregson and, because of Richard's marriage to Natalie Wood, Craig is an uncle of the actress Natasha Gregson Wagner. His autobiography, The Smallest Giant: An Actor's Life, was published in 2005.

== Filmography ==
=== Film ===
| Year | Title | Role | Type |
|---|---|---|---|
| 1949 | Passport to Pimlico | Uncredited | Feature film |
| 1951 | The Lady with a Lamp | Wounded Soldier | Feature film |
| 1953 | Malta Story | British Officer (uncredited) | Feature film |
| 1954 | The Love Lottery | Cameraman Assistant (uncredited) | Feature film |
| 1954 | The Embezzler | Dr. Forrest | Feature film |
| 1954 | Svengali | Zouzou | Feature film |
| 1955 | Passage Home | Burton | Feature film |
| 1956 | The Black Tent | Sheik Faris | Feature film |
| 1956 | Yield to the Night | Jim Lancaster | Feature film |
| 1956 | Eyewitness | Jay Church | Feature film |
| 1956 | House of Secrets | Larry Ellis / Steve Chancellor | Feature film |
| 1957 | High Tide at Noon | Nils Sorenson | Feature film |
| 1957 | Campbell's Kingdom | Boy Bladen | Feature film |
| 1958 | The Silent Enemy | Leading Seaman Sydney Knowles | Feature film |
| 1958 | Nor the Moon by Night | Rusty Miller | Feature film |
| 1958 | Sea of Sand | Captain Tim Cotton | Feature film |
| 1959 | Life in Emergency Ward 10 | Dr. Stephen Russell | Feature film |
| 1959 | Sapphire | Inspector Phil Learoyd | Feature film |
| 1959 | Upstairs and Downstairs | Richard Barry | Feature film |
| 1960 | The Angry Silence | Joe Wallace | Feature film |
| 1960 | Cone of Silence | Captain Hugh Dallas | Feature film |
| 1960 | Doctor in Love | Dr. Richard Hare | Feature film |
| 1961 | Payroll | Johnny Mellors | Feature film |
| 1961 | Mysterious Island | Captain Cyrus Harding | Feature film |
| 1961 | No My Darling Daughter | Thomas Barclay | Feature film |
| 1962 | A Pair of Briefs | Tony Stevens | Feature film |
| 1962 | Life for Ruth | John Paul Harris | Feature film |
| 1962 | The Iron Maiden | Jack Hopkins | Feature film |
| 1962 | The Captive City | Captain Robert Elliott | Feature film |
| 1963 | Stolen Hours | Dr. John Carmody | Feature film |
| 1965 | Sandra | Andrew Dawdson | Feature film |
| 1965 | Life at the Top | Mark | Feature film |
| 1966 | A Choice of Kings | Harold Godwinson | TV movie |
| 1966 | Modesty Blaise | Paul Hagan | Feature film |
| 1968 | Star! | Sir Anthony Spencer | Feature film |
| 1969 | The Royal Hunt of the Sun | Estete | Feature film |
| 1970 | Twinky | Daddy | Feature film |
| 1970 | Country Dance | Douglas Dow | Feature film |
| 1970 | Rendezvous with Dishonour | Colonel Stephen Mallory | Feature film |
| 1971 | A Town Called Bastard | Paco | Feature film |
| 1973 | The Vault of Horror | Maitland | Anthology film Segment 4: "Bargain in Death" |
| 1974 | Essington | | Feature film |
| 1975 | Last Rites | Eric Cordett | Feature film |
| 1975 | Inn of the Damned | Paul Melford | Feature film |
| 1975 | Ride a Wild Pony | James Ellison | Feature film |
| 1976 | The Fourth Wish | Dr. Richardson | Feature film |
| 1978 | The Irishman | Paddy Doolan | Feature film |
| 1982 | Turkey Shoot | Charles Thatcher | Feature film |
| 1988 | Appointment with Death | Lord Peel | Feature film |
| 2003 | Fat Pizza | Judge | Feature film |

=== Television ===
| Year | Title | Role | Type |
|---|---|---|---|
| 1970 | Shadows of Fear | | TV series |
| 1973 | Arthur of the Britons | Kurk | TV series |
| 1976 | The Emigrants | Bill Parker | TV miniseries |
| 1976 | Rush | | TV series |
| 1979 | The Danedyke Mystery | Reverend Septimus Treloar | TV series |
| 1980 | The Professionals | | TV series |
| 1980 | Shoestring | | TV series |
| 1980 | The Timeless Land | Stephen Mannion | TV series |
| 1981–83 | Triangle | Captain John Anderson | TV series |
| 1982 | Tales of the Unexpected | | TV series |
| 1986 | Robin of Sherwood | Earl of Huntingdon | TV series |
| 1986 | Doctor Who | Commodore Travers | TV series, Serial: Terror of the Vervoids |
| 1989–95 | G.P. | Dr. William Sharp | TV series |
| 1991 | Brides of Christ | | TV miniseries |
| 2000 | Grass Roots | Gordon Mahon | TV series |
| 2003 | Always Greener | | TV series |
| 2005 | The Incredible Journey of Mary Bryant | Judge Stephens | TV miniseries |
| 2018 | Talking Pictures TV | | TV special - interview |

== Stage ==
| Year | Title | Role | Type |
|---|---|---|---|
| 1953 | A Man About the House | | Oxford Playhouse |
| 1954 | Four Winds | Steve Graham | Connaught Theatre with Worthing Theatre Company |
| 1954 | Sailor, Beware! | Carnoustie Bligh | Connaught Theatre with Worthing Theatre Company |
| 1955 | The Wooden Dish | Ed Mason | Theatre Royal, Windsor with Windsor Repertory Company |
| 1957 | The Rainmaker | Bill Starbuck | Theatre Royal, Windsor with Windsor Repertory Company |
| 1961 | Three Posts on the Square | | Arts Theatre, London |
| 1961 | A Whistle in the Dark | Michael Carney Jnr | Theatre Royal, Stratford East, Apollo Theatre, London |
| 1963–64 | Henry VI | Earl of Suffolk | Stratford & Aldwych Theatre, London with Royal Shakespeare Company |
| 1963–64 | Wars of the Roses | | Stratford with Royal Shakespeare Company |
| 1964 | Edward IV | Jack Cade | Aldwych Theatre, London with Royal Shakespeare Company |
| 1964 | I Love You, Mrs. Patterson | Hal Patterson | St Martin's Theatre, Camden, London |
| 1965 | Richard II | Bolingbroke | Nottingham Playhouse Theatre Company |
| 1966 | The Country Wife | Mr Horner | Nottingham Playhouse Theatre Company |
| 1966 | Funny Girl | Nick Arnstein | Prince of Wales Theatre, London (with Barbra Streisand) |
| 1966–67 | The Homecoming | Teddy | Music Box Theatre, New York City & tour with Royal Shakespeare Company |
| 1971–72 | Move Over Mrs. Markham | Philip Markham | Theatre Royal, Sydney, Comedy Theatre, Melbourne |
| 1977 | The Tempest | Prospero | Sydney Opera House |
| 1982 | Deathtrap | Sidney Bruhl (replacement) | Beck Theatre, Hayes, Wimbledon Theatre & other locations with Newpalm Productions |
| 1983 | 84 Charing Cross Road | Frank Doel | Theatre Royal, Bath & Ashcroft Theatre, Croydon |
| 1983–84 | Candida | Rev James Mavor Morel | Ashcroft Theatre, Croydon, Yvonne Arnaud Theatre, Guildford |
| 1985 | Nightcap | Cliff Jordan | Grand Theatre, Blackpool, Alexandra Theatre, Birmingham & other locations |
| 1987 | Barnaby and the Old Boys | | Theatr Clwyd |
| 1988 | The Browning Version / Harlequinade | George Chudleigh / Dr Frobisher | His Majesty's Theatre, Perth, Canberra Theatre, Her Majesty's Theatre, Sydney, Comedy Theatre, Melbourne |
| 1990 | Love Letters | Andrew Makepeace III | Sydney Opera House |
| 1995 | Paradise Lost | | St George’s Cathedral, Perth |
| 1996 | Quartermaine’s Terms | | Marian Street Theatre, Sydney |
| 1998 | A Delicate Balance | | Sydney Opera House with STC |
| 2000 | Travelling North | | University of Sydney with Ensemble Theatre |
| 2001 | Julius Caesar | Julius Caesar | Sydney Opera House, Wagga Wagga Civic Theatre, Orange Civic Theatre, Playhouse, Melbourne, Playhouse, Canberra, Theatre Royal, Hobart, Geelong Arts Centre, Newcastle Civic Theatre, His Majesty's Theatre, Perth |
| 2003 | Broken Glass | | Ensemble Theatre, Sydney |
| 2005 | Love Letters | Andrew Makepeace III | NIDA Parade Theatre |
| 2005–07 | Under Milk Wood | First Voice / Captain Cat | Australian tour |
| 2007, 2009 | Trying | Francis Biddle | Ensemble Theatre, Sydney & Finborough Theatre, London |
