= Escapade (1955 film) =

1955 film by Philip Leacock

- Original British quad poster
- Directed by: Philip Leacock
- Screenplay by: Donald Ogden Stewart
- Based on: Escapade by Roger MacDougall
- Produced by: Daniel M. Angel; Hannah Weinstein
- Starring: John Mills; Yvonne Mitchell; Alastair Sim
- Cinematography: Eric Cross
- Edited by: John Trumper
- Music by: Bruce Montgomery
- Production company: Pinnacle Productions
- Distributed by: Eros Films; Distributors Corporation of America (US)
- Release date: 4 August 1955
- Running time: 87 minutes
- Country: United Kingdom
- Language: English

Escapade is a 1955 British comedy drama film directed by Philip Leacock and starring John Mills, Yvonne Mitchell and Alastair Sim. It was written by Donald Ogden Stewart based on the long-running West End play of the same title by Roger MacDougall.

== Plot summary ==
A husband and father becomes so preoccupied with a political cause that he neglects his familial responsibilities, leading to his children running away from home.

== Cast ==
- John Mills as John Hampden
- Yvonne Mitchell as Mrs. Stella Hampden
- Alastair Sim as Dr. Skillingworth
- Jeremy Spenser as L. W. Daventry
- Andrew Ray as Max Hampden
- Marie Lohr as Stella Hampden, Senior
- Colin Gordon as Deeson, reporter
- Nick Edmett as Paton
- Peter Asher as Johnny Hampden
- Christopher Ridley as Potter
- Sean Barrett as Warren
- Colin Freear as Richard 'Young Skilly' Skillingworth
- Kit Terrington as Smith
- Mark Dignam as Sykes
- James Drake as Kirkland
- Sonia Williams as Miss Betts
- John Rae as Curly

== Production ==
The film was produced in March 1955 at the Nettlefold Studios in Walton-on-Thames in Surrey. The film's sets were designed by the art director Bernard Robinson. The location shots of the school were filmed at Epsom College.

== Critical reception ==
The Monthly Film Bulletin wrote: "This adaptation of Roger MacDougall's play is a well-meant but unsatisfactory affair. ...The self-dramatising pacifist father is a vague, unresolved character (peculiarly unattractive in John Mills' performance), and the part of Skillingsworth has been expanded to provide some skilful but irrelevant comic interludes from Alastair Sim. Yvonne Mitchell brings her usual distinction to the somewhat unrewarding part of Stella, and Jeremy Spenser is excellent as the schoolfriend, Daventry."

In The New York Times, Bosley Crowther wrote: "It is a curiously notional and impractical expostulation against war, obviously well-intended but as humorless as a labored gag. ... Played with an air of forthright mischief, this slap at adult muddling might be appropriately sardonic and amusing. But there's nothing mischievous in the stilted and self-conscious manner in which director Philip Leacock has put it on the screen. The dialogue is ponderous and the actors – especially the kids – spout it out as if they are preaching sermons. The effect is depressingly flat."

Leonard Maltin gave it three out of four stars, calling it an "Ambitious, insightful, solidly acted drama about the cynicism and hypocrisy of adults and the idealism of youth."

TV Guide gave the film two out of four stars, calling it, "...an okay comedy with a message, but the play was better."
