= Escapade (play) =

1952 play

- Written by: Roger MacDougall
- Original language: English
- Genre: Drama

Premiere
- Date premiered: 22 December 1952
- Place premiered: Theatre Royal, Brighton

Escapade is a 1952 play by the British writer Roger MacDougall.

After premiering at the Theatre Royal, Brighton in December 1952 it transferred to the West End where it ran for 447 performances between 20 January 1953 and 20 February 1954, initially at St James's Theatre and then at the Strand Theatre. The original cast featured Phyllis Calvert, Nigel Patrick, Hugh Griffith, Michael Aldridge, Ernest Clark, Edith Sharpe and Patricia Marmont.

== Adaptation ==
In 1955 it was adapted into a film of the same title directed by Philip Leacock and starring John Mills, Yvonne Mitchell and Alastair Sim.

== Bibliography ==
- Goble, Alan. The Complete Index to Literary Sources in Film. Walter de Gruyter, 1999.
- Wearing, J.P. The London Stage 1950-1959: A Calendar of Productions, Performers, and Personnel. Rowman & Littlefield, 2014.
