= Natalie Wood =

American actress (1938–1981)

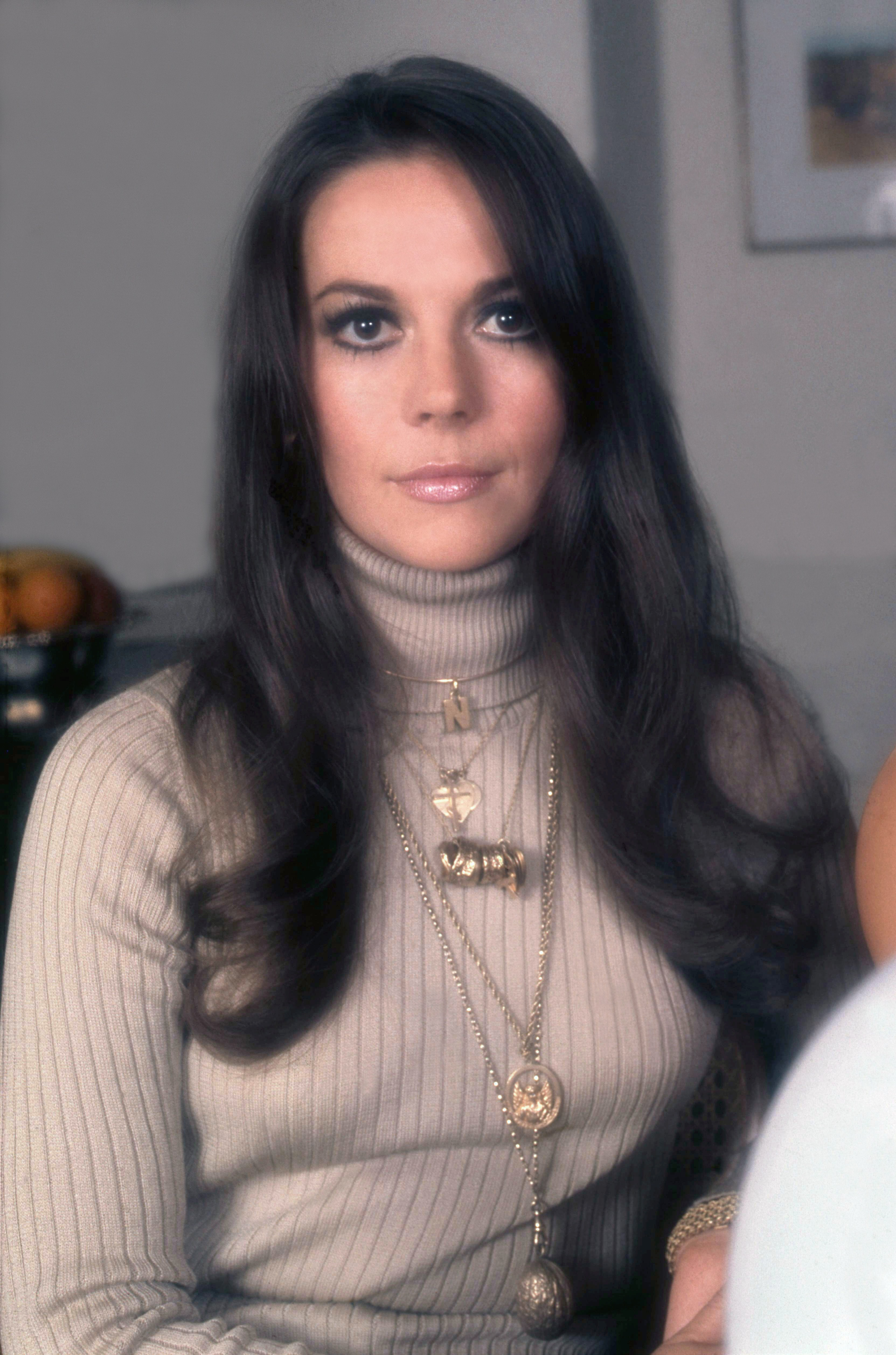
- Wood in 1973
- Born: Natalie Zacharenko; July 20, 1938; San Francisco, California, U.S.
- Died: November 29, 1981 (aged 43); Pacific Ocean near the Isthmus of Catalina Island
- Cause of death: "Drowning and other undetermined factors"
- Resting place: Westwood Village Memorial Park Cemetery
- Other name: Natasha Gurdin
- Occupation: Actress
- Years active: 1943–1981
- Spouses: Robert Wagner (m. 1957; div. 1962) (m. 1972) Richard Gregson (m. 1969; div. 1972)
- Children: 2, including Natasha Gregson
- Relatives: Lana Wood (sister); Barry Watson (son-in-law)

Natalie Wood (née Zacharenko; July 20, 1938 – November 29, 1981) was an American actress. She began acting at age four and co-starred at age eight in Miracle on 34th Street (1947). As a teenager, she was nominated for an Academy Award for Best Supporting Actress for her performance in Rebel Without a Cause (1955), followed by a role in John Ford's The Searchers (1956).

Wood starred in the musical films West Side Story (1961) and Gypsy (1962) and received nominations for an Academy Award for Best Actress for her performances in Splendor in the Grass (1961) and Love with the Proper Stranger (1963). Her career continued with films such as Sex and the Single Girl (1964), The Great Race (1965), Inside Daisy Clover (1965), This Property Is Condemned, Penelope (1966), and Bob & Carol & Ted & Alice (1969).

During the 1970s, Wood began a hiatus from film and had two daughters: one with Robert Wagner, her first husband, and one with her second husband, Richard Gregson. She acted in only two feature films throughout the decade, but she appeared slightly more often in television productions, including a remake of From Here to Eternity (1979) for which she won a Golden Globe Award. Wood's films represented a "coming of age" for her and for Hollywood films in general. Critics have suggested that her cinematic career represents a portrait of modern American womanhood in transition because she was one of the few to take both child roles and those of middle-aged characters.

On November 29, 1981, at the age of 43, Wood drowned in the Pacific Ocean at Santa Catalina Island during a break from production of her would-be comeback film Brainstorm (1983). She was with her husband Wagner and Brainstorm co-star Christopher Walken. The events surrounding her death have been the subject of conflicting witness statements, prompting the Los Angeles County Sheriff's Department, under the instruction of the coroner's office, to list her cause of death as "drowning and other undetermined factors" in 2012. In 2018, Wagner was named as a person of interest in the ongoing investigation into her death.

== Early life ==
Wood was born Natalie Zacharenko (Note: Though Natalia Nikolaevna Zakharenko (Note: In this name that follows East Slavic naming customs, the patronymic is Nikolaevna and the family name is Zakharchenko.) has been cited as Wood's real name, her birth certificate recorded it as, simply, Natalie Zacharenko (spelled with a "c", not a "k"), as did her birth announcement in the San Francisco Examiner.) in San Francisco on July 20, 1938, to Maria Zoudilova (sometimes transliterated Zoodiloff) (Note: Wood's mother was born on January 26, 1908, according to the earliest available records. Sometime in the mid-1930s, she shaved four years off her age—giving her birthdate as February 8, 1912, perhaps because her fiancé was younger—and maintained this lie for the rest of her life.) and second husband Nicholas Zacharenko. She was of Russian descent, and raised in the Russian Orthodox Church. Her mother, who also used the names Mary, Marie, and Musia, was from Barnaul, Russia.

Wood's maternal grandfather owned soap and candle factories, and an estate outside Barnaul. With the start of the Russian Civil War, his family fled Russia for China, settling as refugees in Harbin. Her mother was previously married to the Armenian mechanic Alexander Tatuloff from 1925 to 1936. They had a daughter named Olga (1928–2015) and moved to America by ship in 1930, before divorcing six years later.

Wood's father was a carpenter from Ussuriysk, Russia. Her paternal grandfather, a Primorsky Konditer chocolate factory employee who joined the anti-Bolshevik civilian forces during the war, was killed in a street fight between the Red Army and White Russian soldiers in Vladivostok. After that, his widow and three sons fled to Shanghai, relocating to Vancouver at the time of Wood's paternal grandmother's remarriage in 1927. By 1933, they moved to the United States. Nicholas met Wood's mother, four years his senior, while she was still married to Tatuloff. They were married in February 1938, five months before Wood was born.

A year after Natalie's birth, her father changed the family's surname to Gurdin. In 1942, they bought a home in Santa Rosa, California, where Wood was noticed by members of a crew during a film shoot downtown. After she started acting as a child, RKO executives David Lewis and William Goetz changed her surname to "Wood" to make it more appealing to English-speaking audiences and as a tribute to filmmaker Sam Wood. Her only full sibling, sister Svetlana, was born in Santa Monica in 1946, and later became an actress under the name Lana Wood.

== Child actress ==
=== Early roles ===
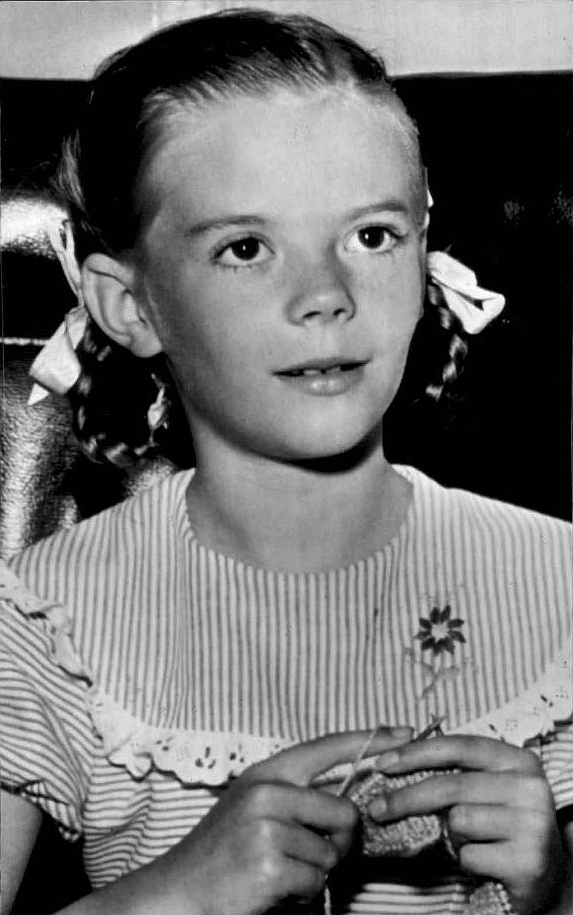
Wood in 1947

Wood's first appearance on screen came when she was just four years old in the March 1943 release of The Moon Is Down based on the John Steinbeck book of the same name. Shortly thereafter, she was cast again in a fifteen-second scene in the film Happy Land (1943). Despite the brief parts, she became a favorite of the director of both films, Irving Pichel. He remained in contact with Wood's family for two years, advising them when another role came up. The director telephoned Wood's mother and asked her to bring her daughter to Los Angeles for a screen test. Wood's mother became so excited that she "packed the whole family off to Los Angeles to live," writes Harris. Wood's father opposed the idea, but his wife's "overpowering ambition to make Natalie a star" took priority. According to Wood's younger sister Lana, Pichel "discovered her and wanted to adopt her."

Wood, then seven years old, got the part. She played a post-World War II German orphan, opposite Orson Welles as Wood's guardian and Claudette Colbert, in Tomorrow Is Forever (1946). When Wood was unable to cry on cue, her mother tore a butterfly to pieces in front of her to ensure she would sob for a scene. Welles later said that Wood was a born professional, "so good, she was terrifying." He also said "Natalie doesn't act from the script, she acts from the heart." Wood acted in another film directed by Pichel, The Bride Wore Boots, and went on to 20th Century Fox to play Gene Tierney's daughter in The Ghost and Mrs. Muir (1947).

=== Miracle on 34th Street ===
Wood's best-known film as a child was Miracle on 34th Street (1947), starring Maureen O'Hara and John Payne at Fox. She plays a cynical girl who comes to believe a kindly department store holiday-season employee portrayed by Edmund Gwenn is the real Santa Claus. The film has become a Christmas classic; Wood was counted among the top child stars in Hollywood after the film and was so popular that Macy's invited her to appear in the store's annual Thanksgiving Day parade.

Film historian John C. Tibbetts wrote that for the next few years, following her success in Miracle, Wood played roles as a daughter in a series of family films: Driftwood (1947), at Republic; Scudda Hoo! Scudda Hay! (1948); Chicken Every Sunday (1949); The Green Promise (1949); Fred MacMurray's daughter in Father Was a Fullback (1949), with O'Hara; Margaret Sullavan's daughter in No Sad Songs for Me (1950); the youngest sister in Our Very Own (1950); Never a Dull Moment (1950); James Stewart's daughter in The Jackpot (1950); Dear Brat (1951); Joan Blondell's neglected daughter in The Blue Veil (1951); The Rose Bowl Story (1952); Just for You (1952); and as the daughter of Bette Davis's character in The Star (1952). In all, Wood appeared in more than twenty films as a child. She also appeared on television in episodes of Kraft Theatre and Chevron Theatre.

Because Wood was a minor during her early years as an actress, she received her primary education on the studio lots wherever she was contracted. California law required that until age 18, child actors had to spend at least three hours per day in the classroom, notes Harris. "She was a straight A student", and one of the few child actors to excel at arithmetic. Director Joseph L. Mankiewicz, who directed her in The Ghost and Mrs. Muir (1947), said that, "In all my years in the business, I never met a smarter moppet." Wood remembered that period in her life, saying, "I always felt guilty when I knew the crew was sitting around waiting for me to finish my three hours. As soon as the teacher let us go, I ran to the set as fast as I could."

Wood's mother continued to play a vital role in her daughter's early career, coaching her, and micromanaging aspects of her career even after Wood acquired agents. As a child actress, Wood received significant media attention. By age nine, she had been named the "most exciting juvenile motion picture star of the year" by Parents magazine.

== Teen stardom ==
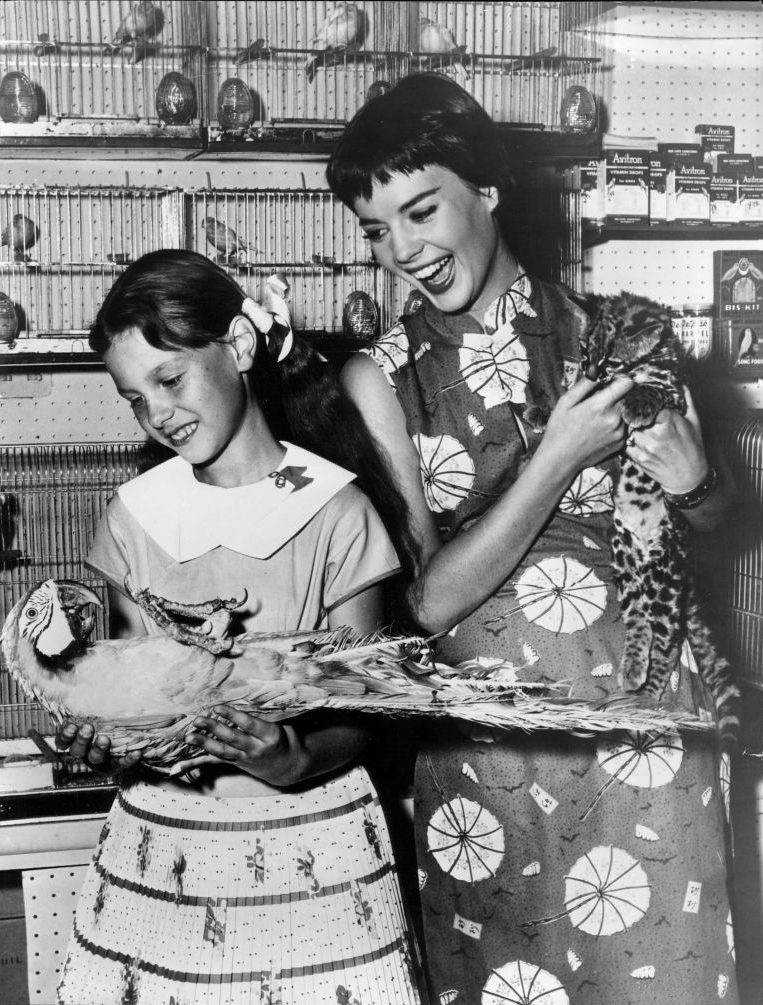
With her sister Lana, 1956

In the 1953–54 television season, Wood played Ann Morrison, the teenage daughter in The Pride of the Family, an ABC situation comedy. She appeared as a teenager on episodes of The Pepsi-Cola Playhouse, Public Defender, Mayor of the Town, Four Star Playhouse, The Ford Television Theatre, and General Electric Theater, and appeared in a TV version of Heidi. She described the GE Theater episode, "Carnival," as one of the best things she ever did. She had roles in the feature films The Silver Chalice (1954) and One Desire (1955).

=== Rebel Without a Cause ===
Wood successfully made the transition from child star to ingénue at age 16 when she co-starred with James Dean and Sal Mineo in Rebel Without a Cause (1955), Nicholas Ray's film about teenage rebellion. Wood had to sign to a long-term contract with Warner Bros. and she was nominated for an Academy Award for Best Supporting Actress. She later said it was the first script she read that she actually wanted to do as opposed to being told to do by her parents; she also said her parents were opposed to her doing it. "Until then I did what I was told," she said. She continued to guest star on anthology TV shows like Studio One in Hollywood, Camera Three, Kings Row, Studio 57, Warner Brothers Presents, and The Kaiser Aluminum Hour. She had a small but crucial role in John Ford's The Searchers (1956) and was the female lead in A Cry in the Night (1956).

=== Tab Hunter and Marjorie Morningstar ===
Wood graduated from Van Nuys High School in 1956. She signed with Warner Brothers and was kept busy during the remainder of the decade in many "girlfriend" roles, which she found unsatisfying. The studio cast her in two films opposite Tab Hunter, hoping to turn the duo into a box-office draw: it never materialized. However, she worked with Hunter in The Burning Hills (1956), a Western, and The Girl He Left Behind (1956). She also guest starred in episodes of Conflict.

Warner Bros tried teaming her with Efrem Zimbalist Jr. in Bombers B-52 (1957). She was given the lead in a prestigious project, Marjorie Morningstar (1958). As Marjorie Morningstar, Wood played the role of a young Jewish girl in New York City, who has to deal with the social and religious expectations of her family as she tries to forge her own path and separate identity.

== Adult career ==
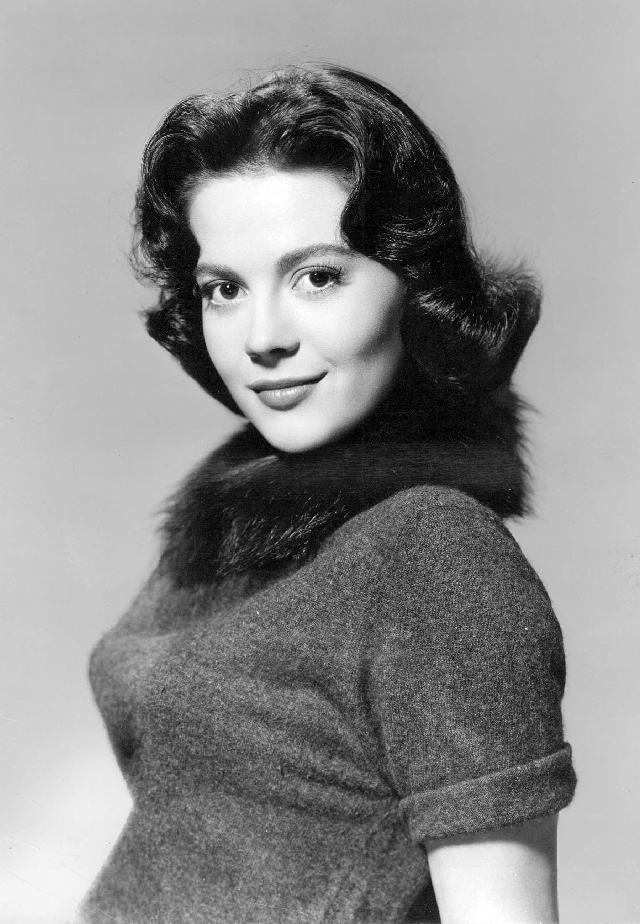
Wood in 1958

Tibbetts observed that Wood's characters in Rebel, Searchers, and Morningstar began to show her widening range of acting styles. Her former "childlike sweetness" was now being combined with a noticeable "restlessness that was characteristic of the youth of the 1950s."

She was the leading lady to Frank Sinatra in Kings Go Forth (1958), then refused roles, and was put on suspension by Warner Brothers. This lasted for a year until February 1959. She returned to be leading lady to James Garner in Cash McCall (1960). After Wood appeared in the box office flop All the Fine Young Cannibals (1960), she lost momentum. Wood's career was in a transition period, having consisted of roles as a child or as a teenager.

=== Splendor in the Grass ===
Biographer Suzanne Finstad wrote that a "turning point" in Wood's life as an actress took place when she saw the film A Streetcar Named Desire (1951): "She was transformed, in awe of director Elia Kazan, and of Vivien Leigh's performance... [who] became a role model for Natalie." "Her roles raised the possibility that one's sensitivity could mark a person as a kind of victim," noted Tibbetts.

After a "series of bad films, her career was already in decline," according to author Douglas Rathgeb. She was then cast in Kazan's Splendor in the Grass (1961) with Warren Beatty. Kazan wrote in his 1997 memoir that the "sages" of the film community declared her "washed up" as an actress, but he still wanted to interview her for his next film:

When I saw her, I detected behind the well-mannered 'young wife' front a desperate twinkle in her eyes... I talked with her more quietly then and more personally. I wanted to find out what human material was there, what her inner life was... Then she told me she was being psychoanalyzed. That did it. Poor R.J. [Wagner], I said to myself. I liked Bob Wagner, I still do.

Kazan cast Wood as the female lead in Splendor, and her career rebounded. He felt that despite her earlier innocent roles, she had the talent and maturity to go beyond them. In the film, Beatty's character was deprived of sexual love with Wood's character, and as a result turns to another, "looser" girl. Wood's character could not handle the betrayal, and after a breakdown, was committed to a mental institution. Kazan writes that he cast her in the role partly because he saw in Wood's personality a "true-blue quality with a wanton side that is held down by social pressure," adding that "she clings to things with her eyes," a quality he found especially "appealing."

Finstad felt that although Wood had never trained in method acting techniques, "working with Kazan brought her to the greatest emotional heights of her career. The experience was exhilarating, but wrenching for Natalie, who faced her demons on Splendor." She adds that a scene in the film, as a result of "Kazan's wizardry... produced a hysteria in Natalie that may be her most powerful moment as an actress."

Actor Gary Lockwood, who also performed in the film, felt that "Kazan and Natalie were a terrific marriage, because you had this beautiful girl, and you had somebody that could get things out of her." Kazan's favorite scene in the film was the last one, when Wood goes back to see her lost first love, Bud (Beatty). "It's terribly touching to me. I still like it when I see it," wrote Kazan. He added, "I didn't have to give her any direction for that final scene; she knew exactly how to play it."

For her performance in Splendor, Wood received nominations for the Academy Award, Golden Globe Award, and BAFTA Award for Best Actress in a Leading Role.

=== West Side Story ===
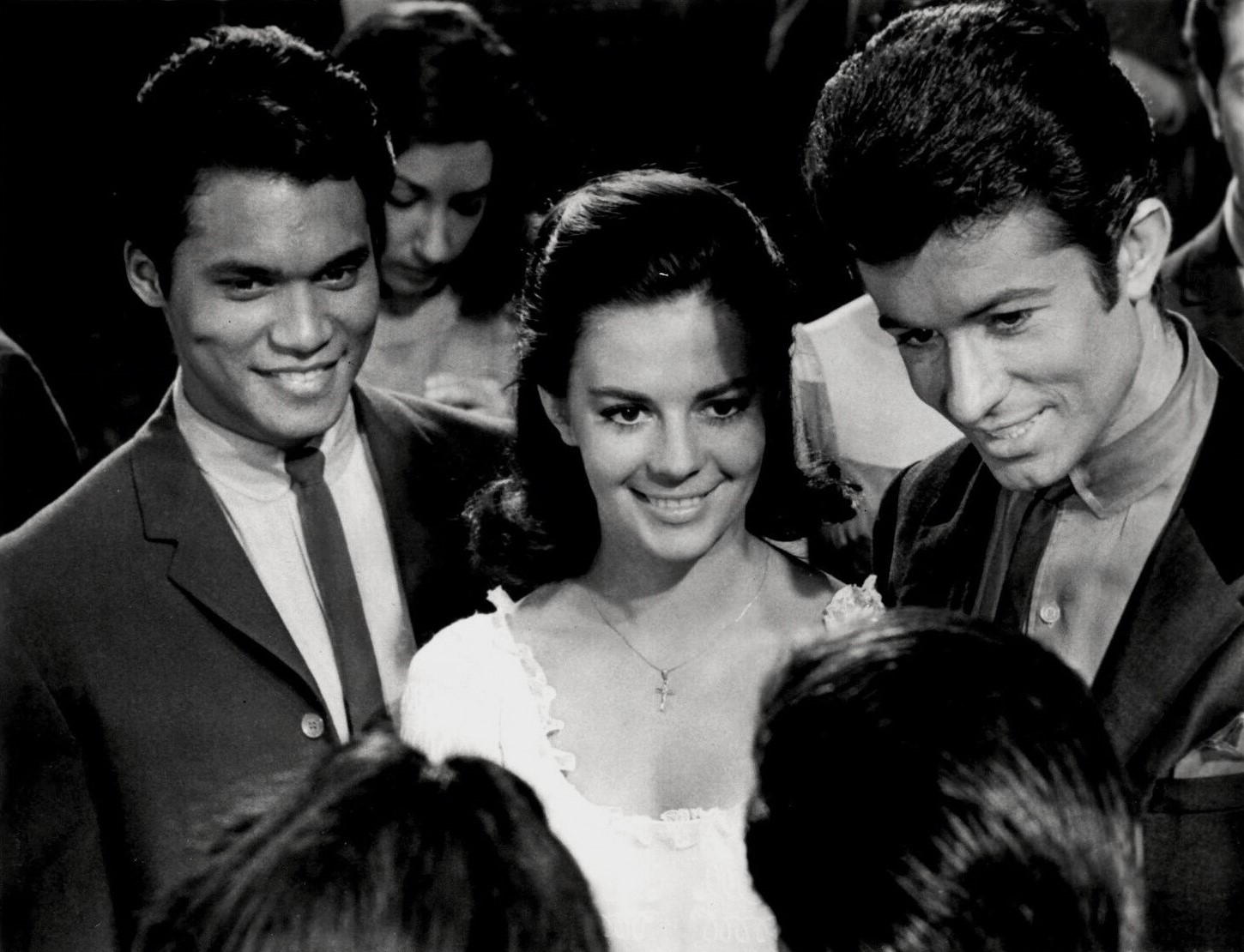
Wood as Maria in West Side Story

Wood played Maria, a restless Puerto Rican girl on the West Side of Manhattan, in West Side Story, a Jerome Robbins and Robert Wise's 1961 film of the stage musical, which was a critical and box-office success.

Tibbetts wrote of similarities in her role in this film and the earlier Rebel, saying that she represented the "restlessness of American youth in the 1950s", expressed by youth gangs and juvenile delinquency, along with early rock and roll. Both films, he observes, were "modern allegories based on the 'Romeo and Juliet' theme, including private restlessness and public alienation. Where in Rebel she falls in love with the character played by James Dean, whose gang-like peers and violent temper alienated him from his family, in West Side Story she enters into a romance with a white former gang member whose threatening world of outcasts also alienated him from lawful behavior."

Although Wood's singing in the film was voiced by Marni Nixon, West Side Story is still regarded as one of Wood's best films.

=== Peak years of stardom ===
Wood sang when she starred in the film Gypsy (1962) alongside Rosalind Russell. Her appearance in that film led critic Pauline Kael to comment "clever little Natalie Wood... [the] most machine-tooled of Hollywood ingénues."

At the age of 25, Wood received her third Academy Award nomination for Love with the Proper Stranger (1963), making Wood, along with Teresa Wright, the youngest person to score three Oscar nominations. This record was later broken by Jennifer Lawrence in 2013 and Saoirse Ronan in 2017, both of whom scored their third nominations at the age of 23.

Wood made two comedies with Tony Curtis: Sex and the Single Girl (1964) and The Great Race (1965), the latter with Jack Lemmon, and Peter Falk. In The Great Race, her ability to speak Russian was an asset given to her character Maggie DuBois, justifying the character's recording the progress of the race across Siberia and entering the race at the beginning as a contestant.

Director Sydney Pollack was quoted as saying about Wood, "When she was right for the part, there was no one better. She was a damn good actress." For Inside Daisy Clover (1965) and This Property Is Condemned (1966), both of which co-starred Robert Redford, Wood received Golden Globe nominations for Best Actress. In the mid 1960s, she was one of the biggest stars in Hollywood along with Elizabeth Taylor and Audrey Hepburn.

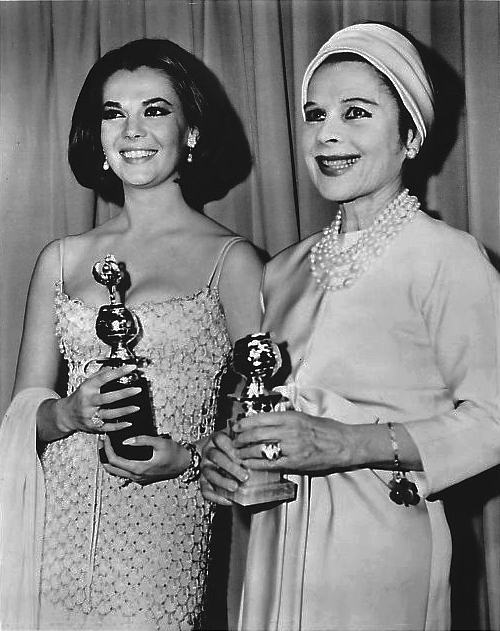
Wood and Inside Daisy Clover co-star Ruth Gordon at the Golden Globe Awards (1966)

With Peter Falk in Penelope (1966)

Although many of Wood's films were commercially successful, at times her acting was criticized. In 1966, Wood was given the Harvard Lampoon award for being the "Worst Actress of Last Year, This Year, and Next". She was the first person to attend and accept the award in person. The Harvard Crimson wrote she was "quite a good sport."

=== Personal struggles and career break ===
Following a disappointing reception of Penelope (1966), Wood took a three-year hiatus from acting. She was announced for I Never Promised You a Rose Garden, but she did not appear in it. Wood later said making Penelope was difficult for her. "I broke out in hives and suffered anguish that was very real pain every day we shot," she recalled. "Arthur Hiller, the director, kept saying, 'Natalie, I think you're resisting this film,' while I rolled around the floor in agony."

By 1966, Wood suffered emotionally. In an attempt to overcome her emotional problems, she sought professional therapy. She paid Warner Bros. $175,000 to cancel her contract and fired her entire support team: agents, managers, publicist, accountant, and attorneys. In the following years, Wood focused on her mental health, and began a relationship with Richard Gregson, whom she married in 1969.

=== Bob & Carol & Ted & Alice ===
After a three-year break from movies, Wood co-starred with Dyan Cannon, Robert Culp, and Elliott Gould in Bob & Carol & Ted & Alice (1969), a comedy about sexual liberation. According to Tibbetts, this was the first film in which "the saving leavening of humor was brought to bear upon the many painful dilemmas portrayed in her adult films." Bob & Carol & Ted & Alice became the signature film of Paul Mazursky and was a critical and commercial success. It was the sixth highest-grossing film of 1969.

Wood did not capitalize on the success of Bob & Carol & Ted & Alice. After becoming pregnant in 1970 with her first child, Natasha, she went into semiretirement and acted in only four more theatrical films during the remainder of her life. She made a brief cameo appearance as herself in The Candidate (1972), working once more with Robert Redford.

=== Semiretirement and television ===
Wood reunited on the screen with Robert Wagner in the television film of the week The Affair (1973), and with Laurence Olivier and Wagner in an adaptation of Cat on a Hot Tin Roof (1976) for the British series Laurence Olivier Presents broadcast as a special by NBC. In between these, she made Peeper (1975) with former beau Michael Caine.

She made cameo appearances on Wagner's prime-time detective series Switch in 1978 as Bubble Bath Girl, and his series Hart to Hart in 1979 as Movie Star.

In 1979, Wood received high ratings and critical acclaim for the made-for-TV movie The Cracker Factory and especially the miniseries remake of From Here to Eternity, with Kim Basinger and William Devane. Wood's performance in the latter won her a Golden Globe Award for Best Actress.

After another lengthy break from features, she appeared in the ensemble disaster film Meteor (1979) with Sean Connery, in which she demonstrated her fluency in Russian, and the sex comedy The Last Married Couple in America (1980) with George Segal and Valerie Harper. Her performance in the latter was praised and considered reminiscent of her performance in Bob & Carol & Ted & Alice. In Last Married Couple, Wood broke ground: although an actress with a clean, middle-class image, she used the word "fuck" in a frank marital discussion with her husband (Segal). She starred in The Memory of Eva Ryker, released in May 1980, which was her last completed production.

=== Brainstorm ===
At the time of her death, Wood was filming the science fiction film Brainstorm (1983), starring Christopher Walken, and directed by Douglas Trumbull. The ending of Brainstorm had to be re-written and Wood's character written out of at least three scenes, while a stand-in and sound-alikes were used to replace Wood for some of her crucial shots. By this time, Wood had already completed all of her major scenes, and Trumbull completed the film by rewriting the script and using Wood's sister Lana for her few remaining scenes. The film was released posthumously on September 30, 1983, and was dedicated to Wood in the closing credits.

She was scheduled to make her stage debut on February 12, 1982, in Anastasia at Ahmanson Theatre with Wendy Hiller. Wood had also purchased film rights to the Barbara Wersba book, Country of the Heart, and was planning to star with Timothy Hutton in the drama about the professional-romantic relationship between a tough-minded poet and her much younger student. The material was later adapted into a 1990 television film starring Jane Seymour. She expected to follow her performance as Anastasia on the stage with a starring stint in a film adaptation of the work.

Wood appeared in 56 films for cinema and television. In one of her last interviews before her death, she was defined as "our sexual conscience on the silver screen." Following her death, Time magazine noted that although critical praise for Wood had been sparse throughout her career, "she always had work."

== Personal life ==
=== Marriages and relationships ===
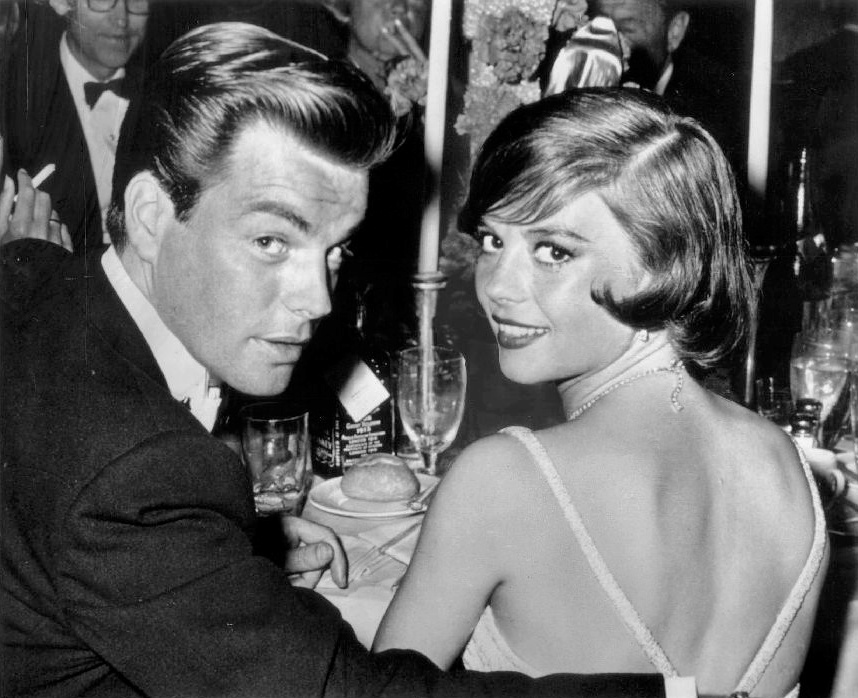
With Robert Wagner, 1960

Wood's two marriages to actor Robert Wagner were highly publicized. They first married on December 28, 1957, in Scottsdale, Arizona, when Wood was 19. At some point during the first half of 1961, according to several published accounts, she caught Wagner having an extramarital affair with another man. The couple announced their separation on June 20, 1961 (though Wagner has since said that they split up in 1960) and divorced on April 27, 1962.

Wood's subsequent boyfriends included Warren Beatty, Michael Caine, and David Niven Jr. She also had a broken engagement in 1965 with Venezuelan shoe manufacturer Ladislav Blatnik.

On May 30, 1969, Wood married British producer Richard Gregson after dating for nearly three years. They had a daughter, Natasha, born September 29, 1970. Wood filed for divorce from Gregson on August 4, 1971. It was finalized on April 12, 1972.

After a short-lived romance with future California governor Jerry Brown, Wood resumed her relationship with Wagner at the end of January 1972. They remarried on July 16 aboard the Ramblin' Rose, anchored off Paradise Cove in Malibu. Their daughter Courtney was born on March 9, 1974.

In 2015, after a third-party source had repeatedly published the claim, former FBI agent Donald Goodwin Wilson openly stated that he and Wood had had a four-year affair, from 1973 to 1977, that began when she was pregnant with Courtney Wagner. In 2016, Wilson spoke on camera about his alleged affair with Wood in a documentary for the cable network Reelz.

=== Rape allegation ===
Suzanne Finstad's 2001 biography of Wood alleges that she was raped by a powerful actor when she was 16, but in it, Finstad did not name the assailant. Through the recollection of Wood's close friends, which included actors Scott Marlowe and Dennis Hopper, Finstad said:

Though her five close friends' memories of some details or timing differ after forty-five years, the essence of what each recalls Natalie confiding to them is the same: that the same married film star lured or tricked Natalie, raped her so brutally she was physically injured, and she was too frightened or intimidated to report it to the police. Natalie "hated" her former screen idol afterward, "shuddering" if she heard his name. She would keep the horrible secret, and behave as if nothing happened whenever their paths intersected, too schooled by Mud [her mother] in the politics of Hollywood to cross a powerful movie star.

During a 12-part podcast about Wood's life in July 2018, Wood's sister Lana stated that Wood was raped as a teenager, and she also stated that the attack had occurred inside the Chateau Marmont during an audition and it went on "for hours." According to Professor Cynthia Lucia, who studied the claim, Wood's rape was brutal. In 2021, a year after the death of Kirk Douglas, Lana published the memoir Little Sister: My Investigation Into the Mysterious Death of Natalie Wood and identified Douglas as Wood's alleged assailant.

== Death ==
On November 29, 1981, Wood died under mysterious circumstances at the age of 43 during the making of Brainstorm. She was on a weekend boat trip to Santa Catalina Island on board Splendour, a 58-foot (18 m) motor yacht owned by her husband, Robert Wagner. Subsequently, she was found dead in the water. Many of the circumstances are unknown; for example, it has never been determined how she entered the water. Wood was with Wagner, her Brainstorm co-star Christopher Walken, and Splendour's captain Dennis Davern on the evening of November 28. (Note: There is still no explanation why Georgianne Walken did not accompany her husband Christopher on the Thanksgiving weekend boating trip.)

Authorities recovered her body at 8 a.m. on November 29, one mile (1.6 km) from the boat, with a small Valiant-brand inflatable dinghy beached nearby. Wagner said that she was not with him when he went to bed. The autopsy report revealed that she had bruises on her body and arms and an abrasion on her left cheek, but did not indicate how or when the injuries occurred.

Davern had previously stated that Wood and Wagner argued that evening, which Wagner denied at the time. In his memoir Pieces of My Heart, Wagner admitted that he had an argument with Wood before she disappeared. The autopsy found that Wood's blood alcohol content was 0.14% and that there were traces of a motion-sickness pill and a painkiller in her bloodstream, both of which increase the effects of alcohol.

The Los Angeles County coroner Thomas Noguchi ruled the cause of her death to be accidental drowning and hypothermia. According to Noguchi, Wood had been drinking and she may have slipped while trying to re-board the dinghy. Her sister Lana expressed doubts, alleging that Wood could not swim, had been "terrified" of water all her life, and that she would never have left the yacht on her own by dinghy. Two witnesses who were on a nearby boat, stated that they had heard a woman scream for help during the night.

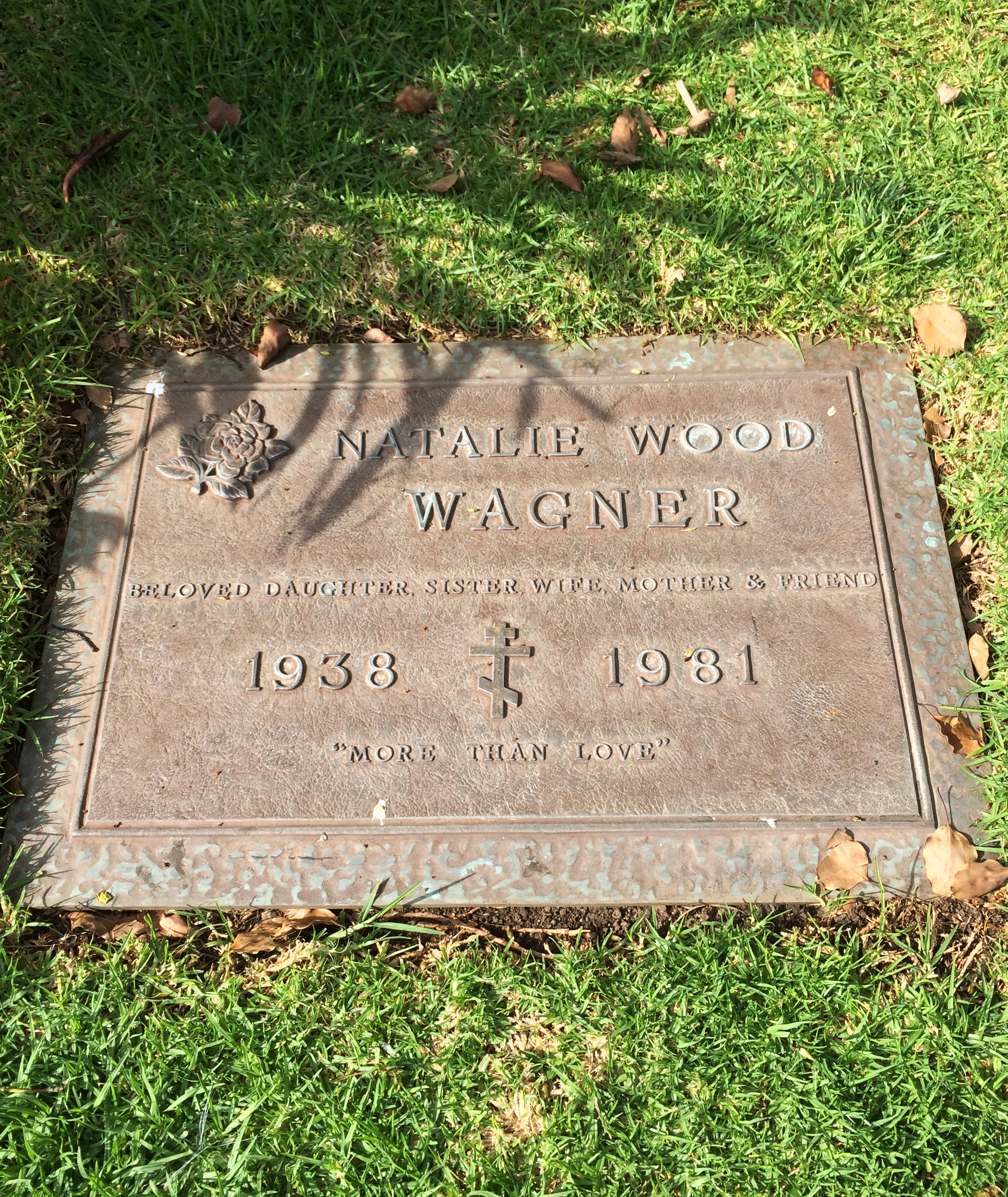
Natalie Wood's grave at Westwood Memorial Park

On December 2, Wood was buried at Westwood Village Memorial Park Cemetery in Los Angeles. Three days later, a coroner's office spokesman pronounced the case closed.

In November 2011, the case was reopened after Davern publicly stated that he had lied to police during the initial investigation and that Wood and Wagner had had an argument that evening. He also stated that Wagner had prevented Davern from turning on the search lights and notifying authorities after Wood's disappearance. Davern alleged that Wagner was responsible for her death. Wood's sister, Lana Wood, speaking to CBS News, said that Davern called her over a decade after the incident to explain the events, though she did not know why, as he was "not a close friend."

Lana Wood claimed Davern said "it appeared to him as though RJ [Wagner] shoved her away and she went overboard. Dennis panicked and RJ said, 'Leave her there. Teach her a lesson.' Dennis said he was very panicky that he was sitting and RJ kept drinking and kept drinking. And he'd say, 'Come on, let's get her.' And he said RJ was in such a foul mood, at that point, that he then shut up and was waiting for when, when are they gonna go to her rescue, until all the sound stopped." Walken hired a lawyer, cooperated with the investigation, and was not considered a suspect by authorities.

In 2012, Los Angeles County Chief Coroner Lakshmanan Sathyavagiswaran amended Wood's death certificate and changed the cause of death from accidental drowning to "drowning and other undetermined factors." The amended document included a statement that it is "not clearly established" how Wood ended up in the water. Detectives instructed the coroner's office not to discuss or comment on the case.

In January 2013, the Los Angeles County coroner's office offered a 10-page addendum to Wood's autopsy report. The addendum stated that Wood might have sustained some of the bruises on her body before she went into the water, but that this could not be definitively determined. Forensic pathologist Michael Hunter speculated that Wood was particularly susceptible to bruising because she had taken the drug levothyroxine.

In February 2018, Wagner was named a person of interest by the police in the investigation. The police stated that they know that Wagner was the last person to be with Wood before she disappeared. In a 2018 article, the Los Angeles Times, citing the coroner's report from 2013, reported that Wood had unexplained fresh bruising on her right forearm, her left wrist, and her right knee, a scratch on her neck, and a superficial scrape on her forehead. Officials said that it is possible that she was assaulted before she drowned.

In 2020, a medical doctor and former intern of Noguchi at the time of Wood's death stated that the bruises were substantial and consistent with someone being thrown out of a boat. He claimed that he made those observations to Noguchi.

== Portrayals in film ==
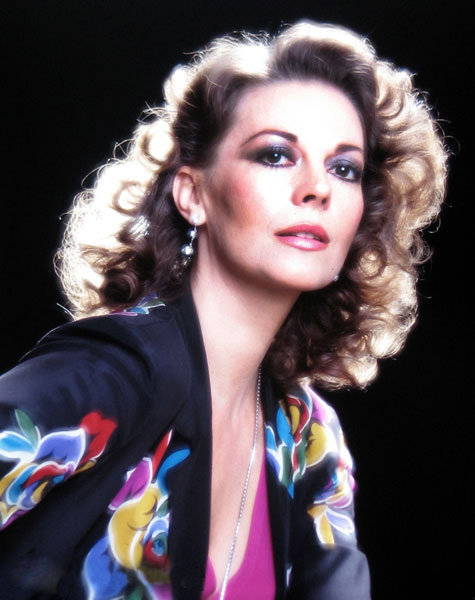
1979 photograph by Jack Mitchell

The 2004 TV film The Mystery of Natalie Wood chronicles Wood's life and career. Justine Waddell portrays Wood.

== Legacy ==
Wood was one of the few child actors who also achieved success as a movie star in adulthood. Wood's career was also a bridge between Old Hollywood and New Hollywood. Bob & Carol & Ted & Alice (1969), a successful film that Wood made after a period of professional and personal setbacks, cemented her place as an actress who was part of both worlds. Wood also achieved success in television, notably in the miniseries From Here to Eternity (1979) for which she won a Golden Globe Award.

However, Wood's professional legacy has, to a degree, been overshadowed by the enormous attention which has been given to her personal life. Her professional life has especially been overshadowed by the circumstances surrounding her death, as well as by her highly publicized marriage, her divorce and her remarriage to Robert Wagner, her relationships with several actors whom she dated in the 1960s, her mental health struggles, and her often troubled relationship with her mother. According to her daughter, Natasha Gregson Wagner, the focus on her death and the speculation about it, "overshadowed her life's work and who she was as a person."

== Accolades ==
Year	Association	Category	Nominated work	Result
1946	Box Office Magazine	Most Talented Young Actress of 1946	Tomorrow Is Forever	Won
1956	Academy Awards	Best Supporting Actress	Rebel Without a Cause	Nominated
1956	National Association of Theatre Owners	Star of Tomorrow Award		Won
1957	Golden Globe Award	New Star of the Year – Actress	Rebel Without a Cause	Won
1961	Grauman's Chinese Theatre	Handprint Ceremony		Inducted
1962	Academy Awards	Best Actress	Splendor in the Grass	Nominated
1962	Golden Globe Award	Best Actress – Motion Picture Drama	Splendor in the Grass	Nominated
1963	BAFTA Awards	Best Foreign Actress	Splendor in the Grass	Nominated
1963	Golden Globe Award	Best Actress – Motion Picture Comedy or Musical	Gypsy	Nominated
1964	Academy Awards	Best Actress	Love with the Proper Stranger	Nominated
1964	Golden Globe Award	Best Actress – Motion Picture Drama	Love with the Proper Stranger	Nominated
1964	Mar del Plata International Film Festival	Best Actress	Love with the Proper Stranger	Won
1966	Golden Globe Award	Best Actress – Motion Picture Comedy or Musical	Inside Daisy Clover	Nominated
1966	Golden Globe Award	World Film Favorite		Won
1967	Golden Globe Award	Best Actress – Motion Picture Drama	This Property Is Condemned	Nominated
1980	Golden Globe Award	Best Actress – Television Series Drama	From Here to Eternity	Won
1983	Saturn Awards	Best Supporting Actress	Brainstorm	Nominated
1986	Hollywood Chamber of Commerce	Hollywood Walk of Fame		Inducted
2011	Palm Springs, California, Walk of Stars	Golden Palm Star		Inducted
2016	Online Film & Television Association	OFTA Film Hall of Fame		Inducted

== See also ==
- List of unsolved deaths
