= The Angry Silence =

1960 British film by Guy Green

- Directed by: Guy Green
- Screenplay by: Bryan Forbes
- Story by: Richard Gregson; Michael Craig
- Produced by: Richard Attenborough; Bryan Forbes; Jack Rix
- Starring: Richard Attenborough; Pier Angeli; Michael Craig; Bernard Lee
- Cinematography: Arthur Ibbetson
- Edited by: Anthony Harvey
- Music by: Malcolm Arnold
- Production company: Beaver Films
- Distributed by: British Lion Film Corporation
- Release date: 15 March 1960
- Running time: 95 minutes
- Country: United Kingdom
- Language: English
- Budget: £97,000

The Angry Silence is a 1960 black-and-white British drama film directed by Guy Green and starring Richard Attenborough, Pier Angeli, Michael Craig and Bernard Lee.

The film marked the first release through screenwriter Bryan Forbes's production venture, Beaver Films, and Forbes won a BAFTA Award for Best British Screenplay at the 14th British Academy Film Awards and a nomination for the Academy Award for Best Original Screenplay at the 33rd Academy Awards for his contribution (shared with original story writers Michael Craig and Richard Gregson). Green called it a "landmark" in his career.

== Synopsis ==
Factory lathe worker Tom Curtis has two children and his wife, Anna, is pregnant, putting him under financial pressure. They live with his friend and co-worker, Joe Wallace. Consequently, Curtis refuses to take part in an unofficial strike, meaning a loss of wages, which he is entitled to do. The strike is planned by outside activist Travers and orchestrated by shop steward Bert Connolly, who concocts spurious demands as part of his campaign to pressure the management into agreeing to a closed shop, giving the union greater influence.

Those who continue to work find that their properties are subject to repeated attacks, including bricks through windows and arson, and join the strike out of fear. Connolly confronts the gang of young perpetrators (consisting of Eddie, Gladys, Mick, and Chuck), aware of their culpability. Curtis alone continues to work in a show of defiance against threats and intimidation. Joe finds himself unable to defend his friend, opting instead to "fall in line" with the majority.

When the strike ends, Curtis is accused of being a scab and sent to Coventry. Then, when anti-union newspapers interview him and report on his plight, Connolly demands his dismissal, backing his demand with a work to rule and overtime ban. Management fears that continued publicity will mean the loss of a major contract, while some workers take matters into their own hands.

Eventually, another wildcat strike occurs, causing a ruckus outside of the factory entrance. Curtis arouses the ire of two of the young thugs, Eddie and Gladys, the former of whom beats Curtis up while the latter keeps lookout. Curtis is sent to the hospital, where the doctors perform surgery to extract one of his eyes. Pat locates Joe, informing him of the news. He arrives at the hospital, whereupon he encounters Anna and the two reconcile. Afterwards, Joe tracks down Gladys and Eddie, running over Gladys's foot with his scooter. Eddie stabs Joe in the stomach during a subsequent struggle, but Joe overpowers him and punches his face several times before dragging him back to the factory. Joe takes the stage and berates the crowd for turning against Tom, ultimately summoning the courage to speak his own mind.

== Cast ==
- Richard Attenborough as Tom Curtis
- Pier Angeli as Anna Curtis
- Michael Craig as Joe Wallace
- Bernard Lee as Bert Connolly
- Alfred Burke as Travers
- Geoffrey Keen as Davis
- Laurence Naismith as Martindale
- Russell Napier as Thompson
- Penelope Horner as Pat
- Beckett Bould as Billy Arkwright
- Brian Bedford as Eddie Barrett
- Brian Murray as Gladys
- Oliver Reed as Mick
- David Jarrett as Chuck
- George Murcell as Jones
- Norman Bird as Roberts
- Lloyd Pearson as Howarth
- Norman Shelley as Seagrave
- Daniel Farson as himself
- Alan Whicker as himself
- Edna Petrie as Harpy
- Ronald Hines as Ball
- Bernard Horsfall as Pryce-Evans
- Roger Maxwell as Collins
- Gerald Sim as Masters
- Marianne Stone as Mavis
- Frederick Peisley as Lewis
- Stephen Lindo as Brian

== Production ==
Kenneth More was initially considered for the role of Tom Curtis but turned it down when offered the lead in Sink the Bismarck!. Director Guy Green said "we all felt very noble" not accepting full pay but says the film was excellent for his career. The film was entered into the 10th Berlin International Film Festival.

== Release ==
After the film's release, Richard Attenborough visited a working men's club in Aberdare, South Wales, that was refusing to show the film. Many such clubs had banned the film because of its anti-strike plot. However, after Attenborough explained his position on the film, the miners allowed it to be screened. This was important because, during the 1960s, films required such showings to drive ticket sales.

== Reception ==
=== Critical ===
The Monthly Film Bulletin wrote: "The first film of a new production company, The Angry Silence bears striking witness to the effect Room at the Top has had on British cinema. One notes its forthright dialogue, contemporary awareness and air of controversy, its energy and its ambition. Too much ambition, perhaps: the film has several themes – mob law, TUC weakness, bad industrial relations, the right to dissent – whose admixture and thorough working out, possible in a novel, are less ideally suited to the cinema. To cover them all successfully would demand a grasp that is as yet beyond Bryan Forbes', the scriptwriter's, capacities. To their credit, the producers, Forbes and Richard Attenborough, have taken evident pains to achieve a surface authenticity." Variety wrote that Guy Green had directed with "quiet skill, leaving the film to speak for itself'. Stanley Kauffmann of The New Republic described it as "an excellently made and disturbing film".

The Radio Times Guide to Films gave the film 3/5 stars, writing: "Although this fascinating melodrama was made decades ago, its attitudes to trade unionism and industrial action are curiously contemporary. Screenwriter Bryan Forbes explores a range of political issues, but the practised rhetoric sounds false in the mouths of the rank and file, and the best moments are not the confrontations between strikebreaker Richard Attenborough and his workmates, but those depicting the pressures on his marriage. Attenborough gives a sterling performance, but the acting honours go to Pier Angeli as his distraught wife and Alfred Burke as the devious agent provocateur."

Leslie Halliwell said: "Irresistibly reminding one of a po-faced I'm Alright Jack, this remains a fresh and urgent film which unfortunately lost excitement in its domestic scenes." Some critics have raised doubts about the politics of the film, particularly with regard to trivialisation of the needs and demands of the workers. Others suggest that the film is also a reflection of British working-class values at the time, such as 'an Englishman's home is his castle'. On Rotten Tomatoes the film has a rating of 80%, based on reviews from five critics.

=== Box office ===
Kinematograph Weekly said the film "comfortably got by" at the box office.

By 1971 the film had made an estimated profit of £58,000. In 1997 Bryan Forbes estimated the profit at £200,000.
