= Jessica Gregson =

British author (born 1978)

Jessica Gregson (born 24 June 1978) is a British author.

== Publications ==
Gregson's debut novel The Angel Makers was published in 2007 by PaperBooks. It is based on the true story of The Angel Makers of Nagyrév, two Hungarian women who sold arsenic to unhappily married women to kill their husbands.

Her second novel,The Ice Cream Army, was published by Legend Press in July 2009. It is based on the true story of the Battle of Broken Hill, where, in 1915, two men who had emigrated to Australia declared war on the country and attacked a train, killing two of the passengers. The novel is a fictionalised exploration of the racism and prejudice faced by two immigrants in a small town in rural Australia, and the events that led them to take the action that they did.

Gregson's most recent novel, After Silence, was published by Deixis Press in August 2022. Set during the Siege of Leningrad, the story focuses on a remarkable group of musicians, both soldiers and civilians, who come together to perform Shostakovich's Seventh Symphony.

== Personal life ==
Gregson is the daughter of actor Michael Craig and has lived in Australia, Azerbaijan, Sudan and South Sudan. She worked with refugees in the latter countries, and is now a humanitarian education specialist. She lives in Glasgow. She wrote The Angel Makers while working for the Home Office.

Gregson has a degree in anthropology from Churchill College at the University of Cambridge. She also holds a master's degree in Development Studies from the London School of Economics and a master's degree in education from the University of Glasgow.
