= Roger MacDougall =

Scottish playwright, screenwriter and director (1910–1993)

Roger MacDougall (2 August 1910, in Glasgow – 27 May 1993) was a Scottish playwright, screenwriter and director.

== Biography ==
MacDougall began writing the occasional screenplay in the late 30s, working both alone and in collaboration with others. Most of his plays were produced during the 50s. As a screenwriter, his best-known films are The Man in the White Suit (for which he received a 1952 Academy Award nomination) and The Mouse That Roared. He was a cousin of Alexander Mackendrick.

His 1952 play Escapade enjoyed a lengthy run in the West End and was subsequently adapted into a film of the same title.

== The Roger MacDougall diet ==
In 1953, he was diagnosed with multiple sclerosis which eventually resulted in significant disability.

Through disillusionment with orthodox medical treatments at the time, he developed a diet, loosely based on a Paleolithic diet, that apparently returned him to good health and sustained remission. Following this experience, he published a pamphlet describing his diet intended to help other patients to achieve similar results.

== Selected filmography ==
- Midnight at Madame Tussaud's (1936)
- Midnight Menace (1937)
- Cheer Boys Cheer (1939)
- Let's Be Famous (1939)
- Law and Disorder (1940)

== Selected plays ==
- The Gentle Gunman (1950)
- To Dorothy, a Son (1950)
- Macadam and Eve (1950)
- Escapade (1952)
