= Jane Eyre (disambiguation) =

Jane Eyre is a novel by Charlotte Brontë

Jane Eyre may also refer to:

- Jane Eyre (character), the novel's protagonist

== Film and television adaptations ==
- Jane Eyre (1910 film), starring Irma Taylor
- Jane Eyre (1921 film), starring Mabel Ballin
- Jane Eyre (1934 film), starring Virginia Bruce
- Jane Eyre (1943 film), starring Joan Fontaine
- Jane Eyre (Studio One), 1949, starring Charlton Heston
- Jane Eyre (1956 TV series), starring Daphne Slater
- Jane Eyre (1963 TV series), starring Ann Bell
- Jane Eyre (1970 film), starring Susannah York
- Jane Eyre (1973 miniseries), starring Sorcha Cusack
- Jane Eyre (1983 TV serial), starring Zelah Clarke
- Jane Eyre (1996 film), starring Charlotte Gainsbourg
- Jane Eyre (1997 film), starring Samantha Morton
- Jane Eyre (2006 miniseries), starring Ruth Wilson
- Jane Eyre (2011 film), starring Mia Wasikowska
  - Jane Eyre (soundtrack)

== Musical adaptations ==
- Jane Eyre (musical), 1995 musical with music by Paul Gordon
- Jane Eyre (Joubert), 1997 opera by John Joubert with a libretto by Kenneth Birkin
- Jane Eyre (Berkeley), 2000 opera by Michael Berkeley with a libretto by David Malouf
- Jane Eyre (Karchin), 2016 opera by Louis Karchin

== Other ==
- Jane Eyre (New Zealand artist)

== See also ==
- Eyre (disambiguation)
- Adaptations of Jane Eyre
