= Shanti Nilayam =

- Theatrical release poster
- Directed by: G. S. Mani
- Written by: Chithralaya Gopu
- Produced by: S. S. Vasan
- Starring: Gemini Ganesan; Kanchana
- Cinematography: Marcus Bartley
- Edited by: Umanath
- Music by: M. S. Viswanathan
- Production company: Gemini Studios
- Release date: 23 May 1969
- Running time: 149 minutes
- Country: India
- Language: Tamil

Shanti Nilayam (/ʃɑːnθi/ transl. Peaceful House) is a 1969 Indian Tamil-language musical drama film, directed by G. S. Mani in his debut. The film stars Gemini Ganesan and Kanchana, with Nagesh, Vijaya Lalitha, Pandari Bai, K. Balaji and V. S. Raghavan in supporting roles. It is based on the English novel Jane Eyre (1847) by Charlotte Brontë and the American film The Sound of Music (1965).

Shanti Nilayam was released on 23 May 1969, and ran for over 100 days in theatres. Marcus Bartley won the National Film Award for Best Cinematography, and S. P. Balasubrahmanyam won the Tamil Nadu State Film Award for Best Male Playback Singer. The film was remade in Telugu under the same title in 1972.

== Plot ==
Malathi, after losing her parents, lives with her aunt who tortures and treats her like a servant. One day she is dumped in a waste materials facility and she falls sick. Doctor Vijayan, who comes to treat her, sympathises and admits her in a private school-cum-hostel for orphans. Malathi grows up into a young lady and becomes a teacher in the same school.

Baskar, a rich estate owner, lives in Shanthi Nilayam with his older brother Sekar's children (four daughters and a son) and is finding it difficult to bring them up as they are very naughty and every governess he hires is scared away by the children. His cousin Ramu and his mother live at the estate too. Baskar conveys his need to Dr. Vijayan who convinces Malathi to accept the governess job. Initially, the children do not accept Malathi, but her understanding and maturity soon wins them over. Baskar appreciates her work.

Strange things happen in the house: Pappamma, the servant maid laughs and walks at midnight with a candle, Balu visits Baskar regularly for money. Malathi suspects something wrong in the house. She learns that one of the children, Geetha, an innocent, loves Ramu. One night Baskar's coat catches fire and Malathi douses it. She demands to know why Baskar looks like he has lost something, but he does not reply. Balu comes again and Baskar gives him money and tells him that he will not give him any more.

Baskar's family friend, Parvatham arrives with her husband and daughter Sheela. Parvatham suggests the marriage of Baskar and Sheela and Malathi is upset hearing this. Malathi's aunt, with her daughters Saradha and Sumathi, arrives there after having fallen in their lives. Ramu's mother accepts them and they stay with Malathi. Sheela and her mother treat Malathi and her relatives badly. They spread rumours about Malathi, and Baskar shouts at Malathi to behave properly like an educated person. Malathi feels that even Baskar is treating her like a servant and decides to leave the house. However, Ramu stops her and states the children's needs and she stays back. Baskar understands Malathi's commitment to the family and expresses his love for her. Sheela overhears this and shouts at Malathi for snatching away Baskar. Baskar asks Sheela and her family to leave. The children are happy about Malathi and Baskar uniting. Baskar schedules their wedding for the following Friday. One day, Malathi sees Balu with bloodstains and demands an explanation from Baskar who promises to reveal everything soon.

During the marriage proceeding, Balu arrives and states that Baskar has already married his sister. Baskar accepts and reveals that he indeed married Janaki, a mad woman and explains the circumstances of the marriage. Baskar's father in an altercation, hit Singaram, Balu's father, leading to his death. Balu blackmails Baskar's father to marry his sister to Bhaskar and give a part of the wealth to her. Baskar's father refuses, but Baskar, to save the family's prestige, agrees and marries Janaki, but finds her totally mad. He gives her the best medical treatment, but there is no improvement in Janaki. Pappamma cares for her. Baskar's brother Sekar was killed in a fire lit by Janaki. Ramu's mother confirms the facts and Malathi is shocked and leaves home. The children cry for her to stay and Kavitha, one of them, follows her. Kavitha falls down unconscious and Malathi stops and returns home along with Dr. Vijayan, who arrives there.

Meanwhile, Balu demands Baskar to transfer the wealth belonging to Janaki to him and threatens to kill him otherwise. Baskar takes him on and beats him. At the same time, Janaki comes out of her room and puts the house on fire. Balu, Janaki and Pappamma die in the fire. Malathi, Ramu and Dr. Vijayan arrive and save everybody. Baskar and Malathi marry.

== Cast ==
- Gemini Ganesan as Bhaskar
- Kanchana as Malathi
- Vijaya Lalitha as Sheela
- Nagesh as Ramu
- K. Balaji as Balu
- Pandari Bai as Ramu's mother
- V. S. Raghavan as Bhaskar's father
- Vijaya Chandrika as Janaki
- Leela as Paapamma
- Rama Prabha as Geetha
- Manjula as Bhaskar's niece
- Senthamarai as Singaram

== Production ==
Producer S. S. Vasan's son-in-law G. S. Mani sought to remake the American film The Sound of Music (1965) in Tamil and asked Chithralaya Gopu to write the screenplay for the Tamil version, then present it to Vasan as a surprise. Although Vasan liked the screenplay, he felt that the film would not cater to rural audiences, so it was rewritten to be closer to the Charlotte Brontë novel Jane Eyre (1847). The film was Mani's directorial debut. Cinematography was handled by Marcus Bartley, and editing by Umanath. Gopu's recommendation of Kanchana for the lead role was agreed upon by Mani. The film was entirely shot at Ooty and Mohana Kumari was in charge of the art direction. Camera techniques were used in the song "Bhoomiyil Iruppadhu" to show that a helium balloon was flying, while in reality it was not.

== Soundtrack ==
The soundtrack was composed by M. S. Viswanathan, with lyrics by Kannadasan. S. P. Balasubrahmanyam made his debut in Tamil cinema with this film by singing the song "Iyarkai Ennum", even though Adimai Penn (which he signed after Shanti Nilayam) was released first. Balasubrahmanyam's remuneration for the song was ₹150 (equivalent to ₹7,800 or US$81 in 2023).

Track listing
No.	Title	Singer(s)	Length
1.	"Iyarkai Ennum"	S. P. Balasubrahmanyam, P. Susheela	3.29
2.	"Kadavul Orunaal"	P. Susheela	4.33
3.	"Boomiyil Irupathum Vanathil"	T. M. Soundararajan	3.02
4.	"Selvangale"	P. Susheela	3.08
5.	"Pennai Parthum"	L. R. Eswari	3.24
6.	"Iraivan Varuvaan"	P. Susheela	3.52
Total length:			16.96

== Release and reception ==
Shanti Nilayam was released on 23 May 1969. The Indian Express said the film "succeeds extraordinarily in so far as it adapts (or copies) The Sound of Music. But it fails miserably in other parts". The critic lauded Marcus Bartley's cinematography, particularly the outdoor shots, but felt the indoor shots "do not go with the story", and though the sets were well designed, "nothing more than a few sofa sets are used". They also praised the music and said Ganesan was "very stiff" in romantic scenes and Kanchana was "ravishing" despite her role not being well written. The film ran for over 100 days in theatres, and Bartley won the National Film Award for Best Cinematography, while Balasubrahmanyam won the Tamil Nadu State Film Award for Best Male Playback Singer.

== Bibliography ==
- Dhananjayan, G. (2014). Pride of Tamil Cinema: 1931–2013. Blue Ocean Publishers. OCLC 898765509.
