= Jane Eyre (character) =

Fictional character

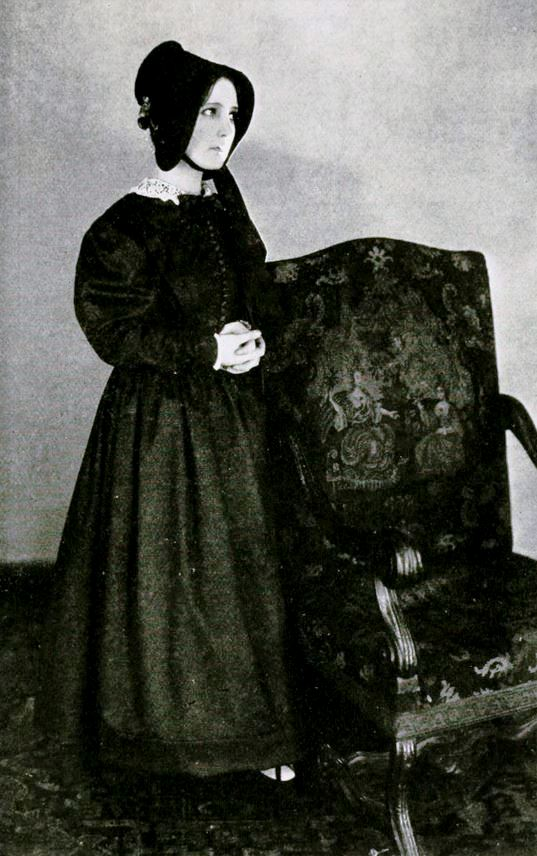
- Mabel Ballin as the title character in the 1921 film Jane Eyre.
- First appearance: Jane Eyre (1847)
- Created by: Charlotte Brontë

In-universe information
- Alias: Jane Elliott
- Nickname: Janet
- Title(s): Miss Eyre; Mrs Rochester
- Occupation: Governess
- Family: Reverend Eyre (father, deceased); Jane Eyre (née Reed) (mother, deceased)
- Spouse: Edward Fairfax Rochester
- Children: Adèle Varens (daughter, adopted); Unnamed son
- Relatives: John Eyre (uncle); Reed (uncle, deceased); Sarah Reed (née Gibson) (aunt by marriage); John Reed (cousin, deceased); Eliza Reed (cousin); Georgiana Reed (cousin); St. John Eyre Rivers (cousin); Diana Rivers (cousin); Mary Rivers (cousin)

Jane Eyre is the fictional heroine and the titular protagonist in Charlotte Brontë's 1847 novel of the same name. The story follows Jane's infancy and childhood as an orphan, her employment first as a teacher and then as a governess, and her romantic involvement with her employer, the mysterious and moody Edward Rochester. Jane is noted by critics for her dependability, strong mindedness, and individualism. The author deliberately created Jane as an unglamorous figure, in contrast to conventional heroines of fiction, and possibly part-autobiographical.

Jane is a popular literary figure due to critical acclaim by readers for the impact she held on romantic and feminist writing. The novel has been adapted into a number of other forms, including theatre, film and television.

== Development ==
Jane Eyre is an orphan living with her maternal uncle and his wealthy wife, Mrs. Reed. After Mr. Reed's death, his wife is left to care for Jane. Jane is mistreated by her aunt who resents, neglects, and abuses her while claiming that the only reason for her care of Jane is charity, which leads to Jane's overall anger towards the Reed family. After a violent argument with her older cousin John, Jane is locked into the Red Room, the room which Mr. Reed died in and which Jane believes is haunted. After Jane believes that she sees her uncle's ghost in the Red Room, she falls ill and faints. This leads to her being sent away to a school on the recommendation of the apothecary, Mr. Lloyd, who attends her, in lieu of a physician. Mrs. Reed then sends Jane to Lowood Institution, a school for poor and orphaned girls. At Lowood, Jane is faced with Mr. Brocklehurst, who funds the school which his mother founded but is abusive in his oversight of the girls. At the school Jane befriends Helen Burns, from whom she learns to be not only patient but also calm. Helen Burns later dies of consumption, while Jane survives a typhus epidemic at the school premises.

During her time at Lowood, Jane receives a thorough education and becomes a friend of Miss Maria Temple, the school's principal. After six years of schooling and two years of teaching at Lowood (without once returning to the Reeds' house in Gateshead) Jane decides to go out into the world on her own. She seeks work as a governess and is employed at Thornfield Hall to care for a French-born orphan, Adèle. At Thornfield, Jane learns about the absent master, Mr. Rochester, and starts to teach his ward.

One evening, when Jane is out walking, she helps a mysterious man when his horse slips and he falls. His harsh and condescending demeanor towards the modest young woman causes immediate friction between the two on the subject of one's place in society. She later learns that this is Mr. Rochester, her employer. Jane and Rochester are immediately interested in each other, though Jane controls her desires out of professionalism and respect for his position as her employer until their relationship becomes more serious. She is fascinated by his rough and dark appearance, as well as his abrupt, almost rude, manner, which she thinks is easier to handle than polite flattery. As for Mr. Rochester, he is very interested in Jane's strength of character, comparing her to an elf or sprite and admiring her unusual strength and stubbornness.

Rochester quickly learns that he can rely on Jane in a crisis. One night, after everybody has retired, strange sounds and smoke lead her to Rochester's room, where she finds Rochester asleep in his bed with all the curtains and bedclothes on fire; she puts out the flames and rescues him. While Jane is working at Thornfield, Rochester invites his acquaintances over for a week-long stay, including the beautiful Blanche Ingram. Rochester lets Blanche flirt with him constantly in front of Jane to make her jealous and encourages rumours that he is engaged to Blanche, which devastates Jane.

During the house party, a man named Richard Mason arrives, and Rochester appears to be afraid of him. At night, Mason sneaks up to the third floor and somehow gets stabbed and bitten. Rochester asks Jane to tend Richard Mason's wounds secretly while he fetches the doctor. The next morning before the guests find out what happened, Rochester sneaks Mason out of the house.

Before Jane can discover more about the mysterious situation, she gets a message that her Aunt Reed is very sick and is asking for her. Jane, forgiving Mrs. Reed for mistreating her when she was a child, goes back to see her dying aunt, despite Rochester's initial reluctance to her leaving and his reluctance to continue to pay her salary while she is gone - in hopes of keeping her dependent on him and Thornfield. When Jane returns to Thornfield, Blanche and her friends are gone, and Jane realizes how attached she is to Mr. Rochester. Although he lets her think for a little longer that he is going to marry Blanche, eventually Rochester stops teasing Jane and proposes to her. She accepts.

On the day of Jane's wedding, two men arrive claiming that Rochester is already married. Rochester admits that he is married to another woman, but tries to justify his attempt to marry Jane by taking them all to see his "wife". Mrs. Rochester is Bertha Mason, the "madwoman in the attic" who tried to burn Rochester to death in his bed, stabbed and bit her own brother (Richard Mason), and who has been carrying out several other unusual acts at night. Rochester was tricked into marrying Bertha fifteen years ago in Jamaica by his father, who wanted him to marry for money. Rochester tried to live with Bertha as husband and wife, but her behavior due to severe mental illness was far too difficult for him to manage, so he locked her up at Thornfield with a nursemaid, Grace Poole. Meanwhile, he travelled around Europe for ten years trying to forget Bertha and keeping various mistresses. Adèle Varens (Jane's student) is the daughter of one of these mistresses, though she may not be Rochester's daughter - a suspicion that led to his cold demeanor towards the girl, and consequently to the hire of Jane to care for her. Eventually he got tired of this lifestyle, came home to England and fell in love with Jane.

After explaining all this, Rochester claims that he was not really married because his relationship with Bertha wasn't a real marriage. He wants Jane to come and live with him in France, where they can pretend to be a married couple and live as husband and wife. Jane refuses to be his next mistress and runs away before she is tempted to agree, leaving behind all the nice items he had purchased for her.

Jane travels away from Thornfield. Having no money, she is almost starving to death before being taken in by the Rivers family, who live at Moor House near a town called Morton. The Rivers siblings – Diana, Mary, and St. John (pronounced "Sinjun") – are about Jane's age and well-educated, although somewhat poor. They take whole-heartedly to Jane, who has taken the pseudonym "Jane Elliott" so that Mr. Rochester can't find her. Jane wants to earn her keep, so St. John arranges for her to become the head of a charity school for the poor village girls. When Jane's uncle, Mr. Eyre, dies and leaves his fortune to his niece, it turns out that the Rivers siblings are actually Jane's cousins, and she shares her inheritance with the other three.

St. John, who is a devoted clergyman, wants to be more than Jane's cousin. He admires Jane's work ethic and asks her to marry him, learn Hindustani, and go with him to India on a long-term missionary trip. Jane is tempted because she thinks she would be good at it and that it would be an interesting life. Still, she refuses because she knows she doesn't love St. John, and he does not love her either. He simply believes Jane would make a good missionary's wife because of her skills. St. John actually loves a different girl named Rosamond Oliver, but he won't let himself admit it because he thinks she would make an unsuitable wife for a missionary.

Jane offers to go to India with him, but just as his cousin and co-worker, not as his wife. St. John won't give up and keeps pressuring Jane to marry him. As she is about to give in, she imagines Mr. Rochester's voice calling her name.

The next morning, Jane leaves Moor House and goes back to Thornfield to find out what has happened to Mr. Rochester. She finds out that he searched for her everywhere, and, when he couldn't find her, sent everyone else away from the house and shut himself up alone. After this, Bertha set the house on fire one night and burned it to the ground. Rochester rescued all the servants and tried to save Bertha, too, but she committed suicide and he was injured. Now Rochester has lost an eye and a hand and is blind in the remaining eye.

Jane goes to Mr. Rochester and offers to take care of him as his nurse or housekeeper - a new power dynamic between the two with Rochester's reliance being entirely on Jane. He asks her to marry him and they have a quiet wedding, and after two years of marriage Rochester gradually gets his sight back – enough to see their firstborn son.

== Characteristics and conception ==
Jane Eyre is described as plain, with an elfin look. Jane describes herself as, "poor, obscure, plain and little." Mr. Rochester once compliments Jane's "hazel eyes and hazel hair", but she informs the reader that Mr. Rochester was mistaken, as her eyes are not hazel; they are in fact green.

It has been said that "Charlotte Brontë may have created the character of Jane Eyre as a means of coming to terms with elements of her own life." By all accounts, Brontë's "homelife was difficult." It is apparent that much of the poverty and social injustice (particularly towards women) that are prevalent in the novel, were also a part of Charlotte Brontë's life. Jane's school, Lowood, is said to be based on the Clergy Daughters School at Cowan Bridge, where two of Brontë's sisters, Maria and Elizabeth, died. Brontë declared, "I will show you a heroine as plain and as small as myself," in regards to creating Jane Eyre.

When she was twenty, Brontë wrote to Robert Southey for his thoughts on writing. "Literature cannot be the business of a woman's life, and it ought not to be", he said. When Jane Eyre was published about ten years later, it was purportedly written by Jane, and called Jane Eyre: An Autobiography, with Currer Bell (Brontë) merely as editor. And yet, Brontë still published as Currer Bell, a man.

== Historical and cultural context ==
The Victorian Era in which Charlotte Brontë wrote her novel Jane Eyre provides the cultural framework in which the narrative was developed. Victorian themes are present throughout the novel, including the idea of an angel in the house, the standard of an ideal woman, and the various settings in which the story takes place. The complex role of the woman in Victorian society is highlighted by Bronte's exploration of the appropriate conventions of gender relations in tandem with economic class, marriage, and social status. This image of Victorian England is challenged by Bronte's representation of Eyre's relationship with Rochester, as one that is not motivated by calculated obligation to achieve a desirable social status but rather an autonomous choice made by a woman to marry for love.

Jane Eyre has been described by historian David Hackett Fischer as evocative of a cultural and geographic milieu of the North Midlands of England that in the mid-17th century had produced the Religious Society of Friends, a Protestant religious sect. Many members of this sect immigrated to North America and settled the Delaware Valley in the late 17th and early 18th century. This geographical area had for many centuries contained a significant population of Scandinavian-descended people who were oppressed by and resisted the Norman Conquest based in French Catholicism (the Gothic feature in Jane Eyre, represented by Edward Rochester) and had remained distinct from the Anglo-Saxon culture that produced the Puritan sect (the evangelical Calvinist feature in Jane Eyre, variants of which are represented by Brocklehurst and St. John).

== Analysis ==
Perhaps the first novel to express the idea of the self was Jane Eyre, who from the very start of the novel "resisted all the way" as she was being carried to the Red Room. As stated by Karen Swallow Prior of The Atlantic: "As unbelievable as many of the events of the novel are, even today, Brontë’s biggest accomplishment wasn’t in plot devices. It was the narrative voice of Jane—who so openly expressed her desire for identity, definition, meaning, and agency—that rang powerfully true to its 19th-century audience."

However, there are some details that are difficult to analyse as the author's intentions are unclear. For example, critics have debated if Jane Eyre is supposed to represent the author's life. Several critics have argued that Brontë wrote Jane Eyre as a reflection of how she sees herself: someone who is unglamorous and misunderstood. Other critics disagree and believe that Brontë disconnects herself entirely from the book by creating a fictional autobiography. They explain that is why Brontë chose to give the book its title, "Jane Eyre: An Autobiography".

== Portrayals in adaptations ==
=== Film ===
==== Silent films ====
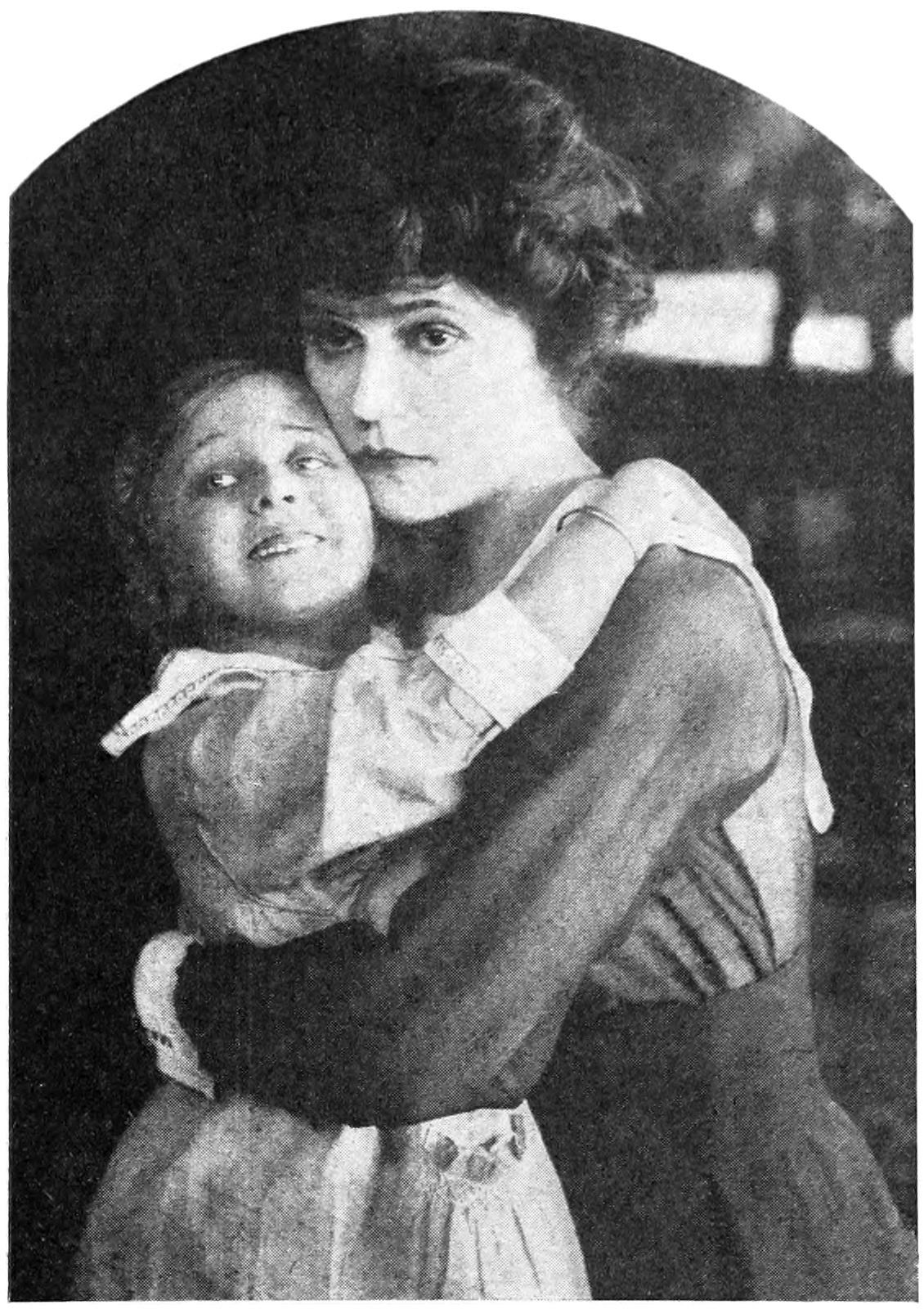
Alice Brady (right) as Jane Eyre in Woman and Wife (1918).

- Irma Taylor as adult Jane and Marie Eline as young Jane in Jane Eyre (1910)
- Lisbeth Blackstone in Jane Eyre (1914)
- Ethel Grandin in Jane Eyre (1914)
- Louise Vale in Jane Eyre (1915)
- Alice Brady in Woman and Wife (1918)
- Mabel Ballin in Jane Eyre (1921)
- Evelyn Holt in Orphan of Lowood (1926)

==== Feature films ====
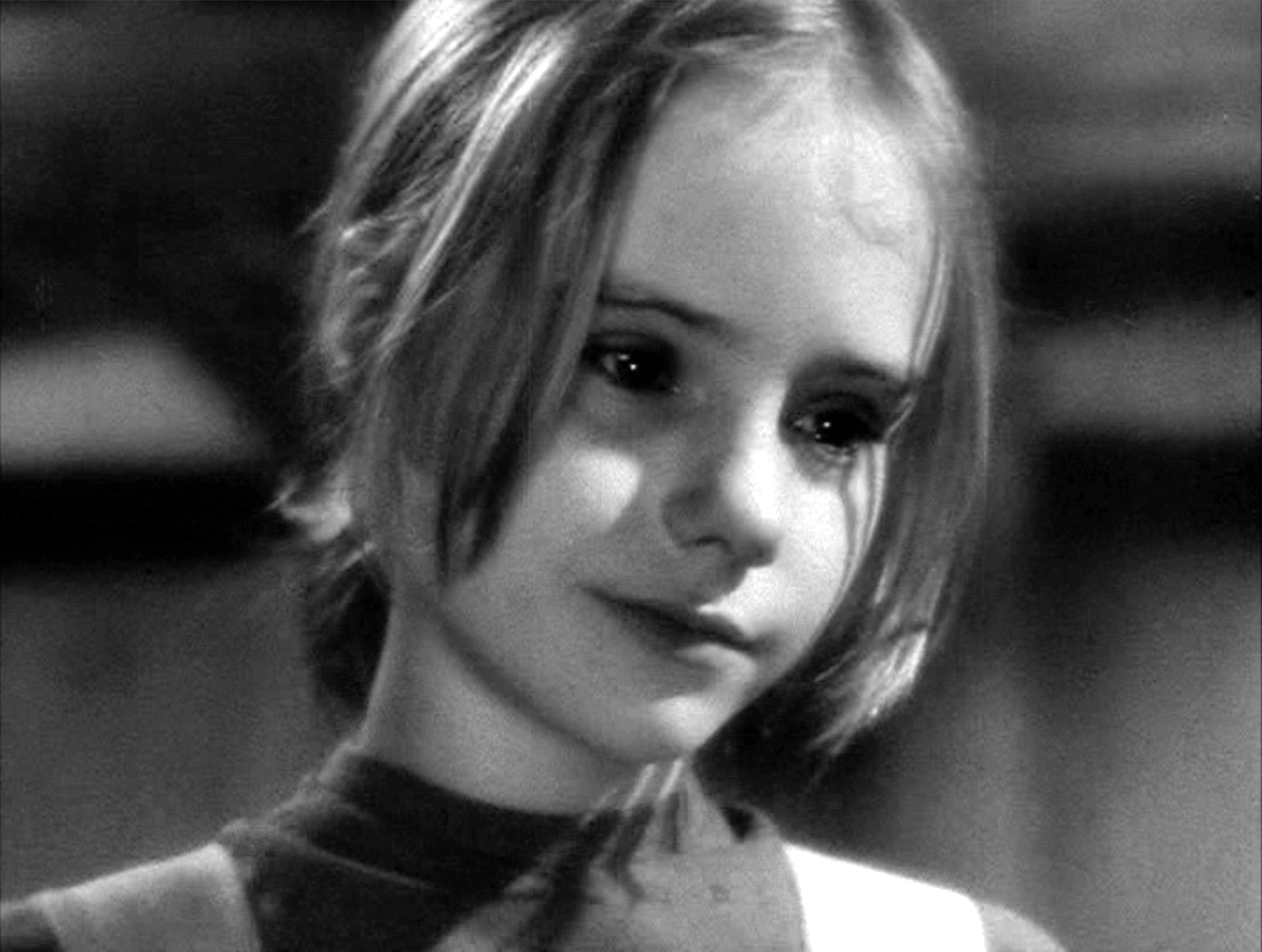
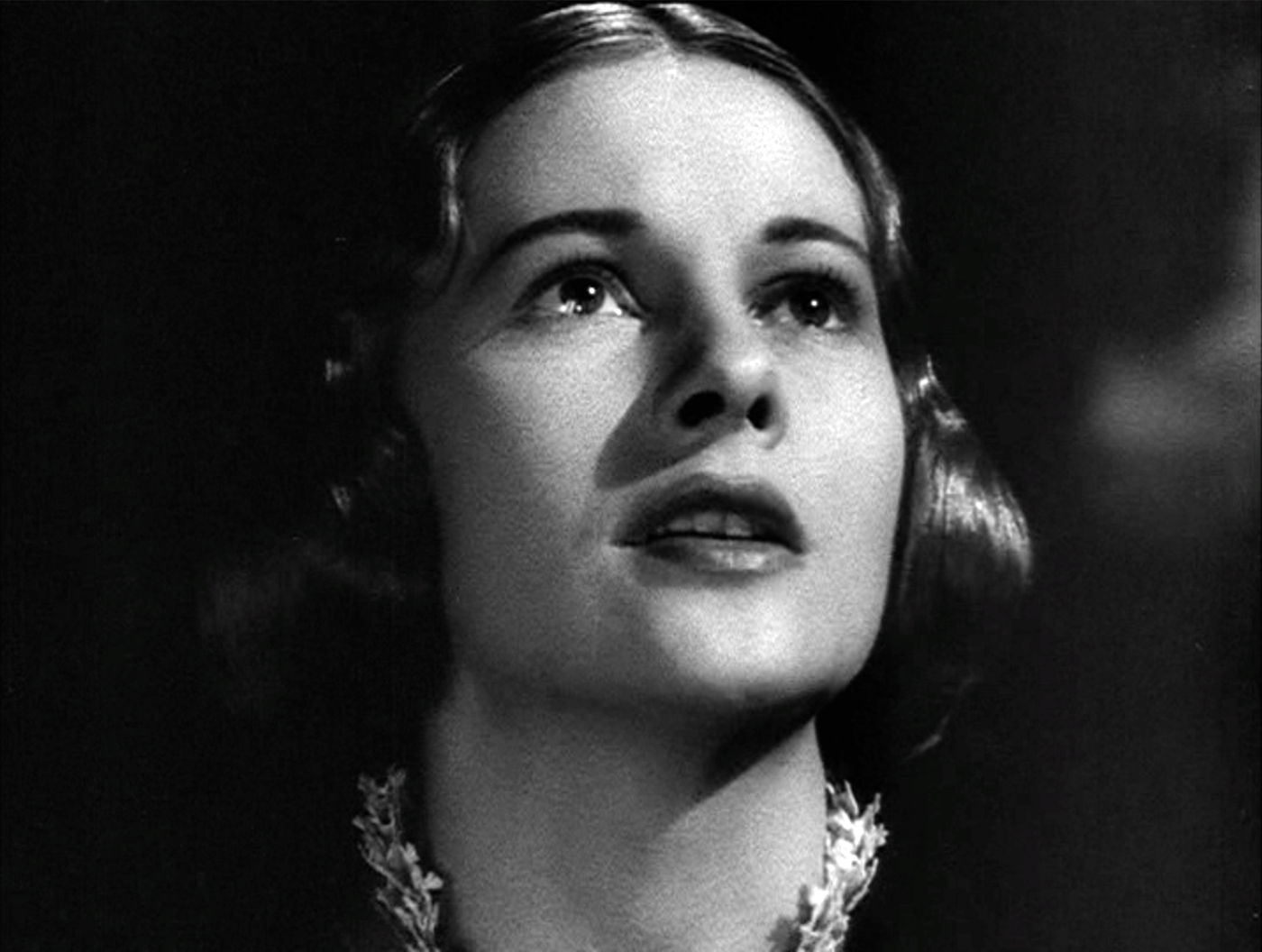
Peggy Ann Garner (left) and Joan Fontaine (right) as young and adult Jane respectively in Jane Eyre (1943).
- Virginia Bruce (adult) and Jean Darling (child) in Jane Eyre (1934)
- Joan Fontaine (adult) and Peggy Ann Garner (child) in Jane Eyre (1943)
- Madhubala as Kamala, Jane's equivalent in the 1952 Hindi-language adaptation Sangdil (transl. Stone-hearted)
- Magda al-Sabahi as Jane's equivalent in the 1962 Egyptian adaption The Man I Love
- Chandrakala as Jane's equivalent in the 1968 Indian Kannada-language film Bedi Bandavalu
- Kanchana as Malathi, Jane's equivalent in the 1969 Indian Tamil-language film Shanti Nilayam (transl. Peaceful House)
- Anjali Devi as Jane's equivalent in the 1972 Indian Telugu-language film Shanti Nilayam
- Susannah York (adult) and Sara Gibson (child) in Jane Eyre (1970)
- Charlotte Gainsbourg (adult) and Anna Paquin (child) in Jane Eyre (1996)
- Samantha Morton (adult) and Laura Harling (child) in Jane Eyre (1997)
- Mia Wasikowska (adult) and Amelia Clarkson (child) in Jane Eyre (2011)

=== Radio ===
Deborah Kerr as Jane Eyre (the narrator) in a 1949 adaptation by NBC University Theatre

- Madeleine Carroll in Jane Eyre by The Campbell Playhouse (31 March 1940)
- Bette Davis in Jane Eyre by The Screen Guild Theater (2 March 1941)
- Joan Fontaine in Jane Eyre by The Philco Radio Hall of Fame (13 February 1944)
- Loretta Young in Jane Eyre by The Lux Radio Theatre (5 June 1944)
- Gertrude Warner in Jane Eyre by Matinee Theater (3 December 1944)
- Alice Frost in Jane Eyre by The Mercury Summer Theatre of the Air (28 June 1946)
- Ingrid Bergman in Jane Eyre by The Lux Radio Theatre (14 June 1948)
- Deborah Kerr in Jane Eyre by NBC University Theatre (1949)
- Sophie Thompson in Jane Eyre on BBC Radio 7 (24–27 August 2009)
- Amanda Hale (adult) and Nell Venables (child) in Jane Eyre on BBC Radio 4's 15 Minute Drama (2016)

=== Television ===
- Mary Sinclair in the Studio One in Hollywood episode Jane Eyre, aired on 12 December 1949
- Katharine Bard in the Studio One in Hollywood episode Jane Eyre, aired on 4 August 1952
- Daphne Slater in the 1956 BBC miniseries Jane Eyre
- Joan Elan in the 1957 NBC Matinee Theatre drama Jane Eyre
- Sally Ann Howes in Jane Eyre, a 1961 television film directed by Marc Daniels
- Ann Bell (adult) and Rachel Clay (child) in the 1963 BBC series Jane Eyre
- Marta Vančurová in Jana Eyrová, a 1972 production by Czechoslovak Television
- Sorcha Cusack (adult) and Juliet Waley (child) in the 1973 BBC serial Jane Eyre
- Daniela Romo (adult) and Erika Carrasco (child) as Mariana, Jane's equivalent in the 1978 Mexican telenovela Ardiente secreto (transl. The Burning Secret)
- Andrea Martin in BBC Classics Presents: Jane Eyrehead, a parody by SCTV (1982)
- Zelah Clarke (adult) and Sian Pattenden (child) in the 1983 BBC serial Jane Eyre
- Ruth Wilson (adult) and Georgie Henley (child) in the 2006 BBC serial Jane Eyre
- Anarkali Akarsha as Suwimali, Jane's equivalent in the 2007 Sri Lankan teledrama Kula Kumariya, screened on Swarnavahini

=== Theatre ===
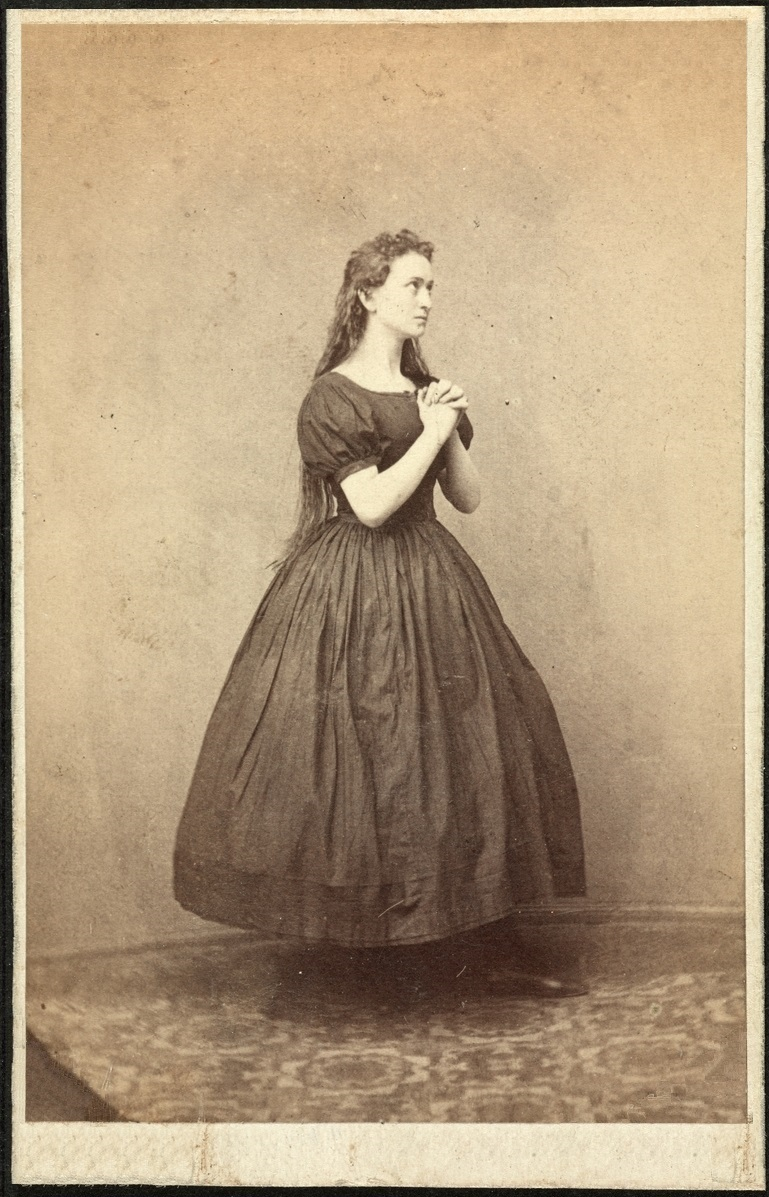
Fredrikke Nielsen performing as Jane Eyre, circa 1860.

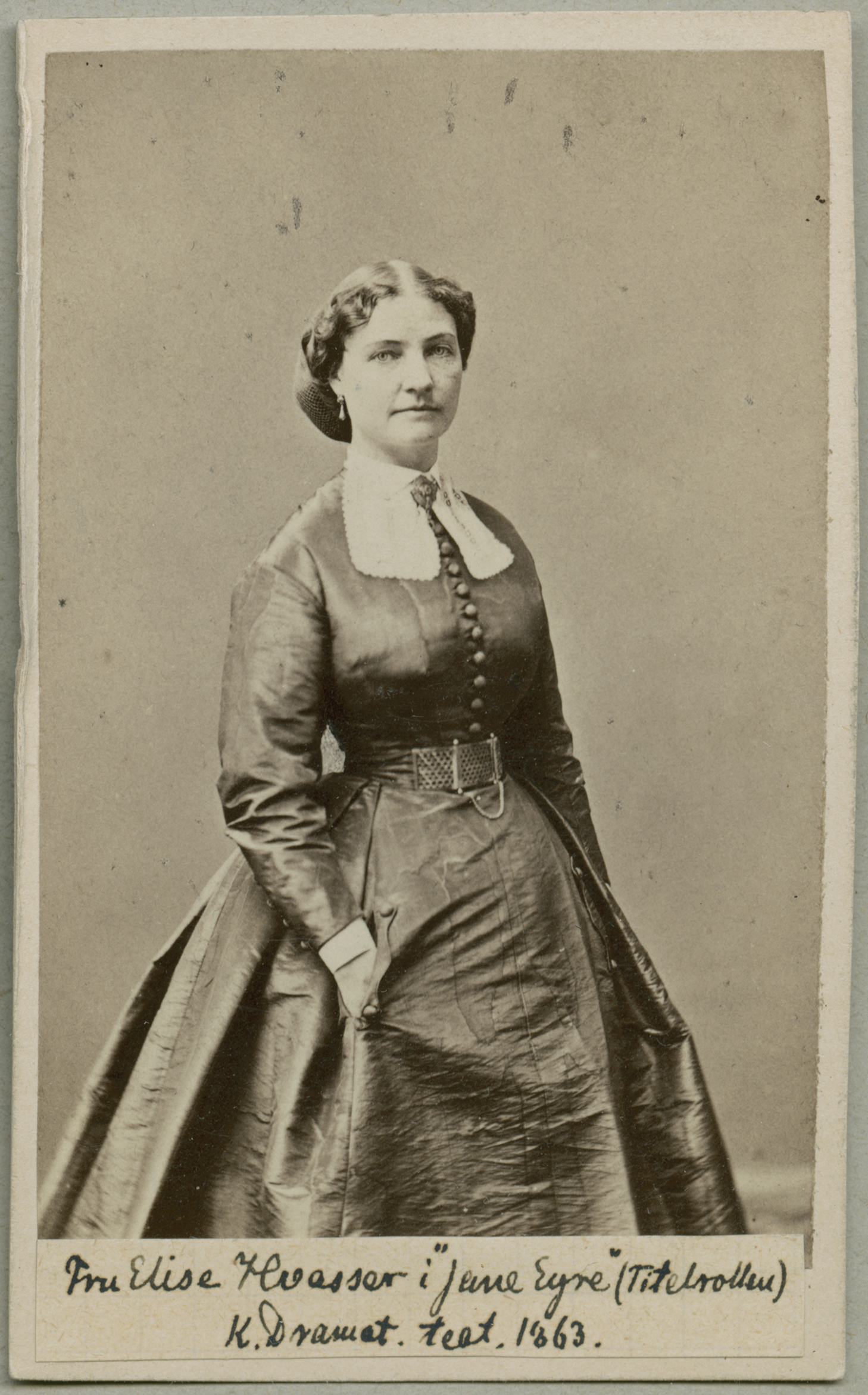
Elise Hwasser in the title role of the play Jane Eyre at Kungliga Dramatiska Teatern in 1863.

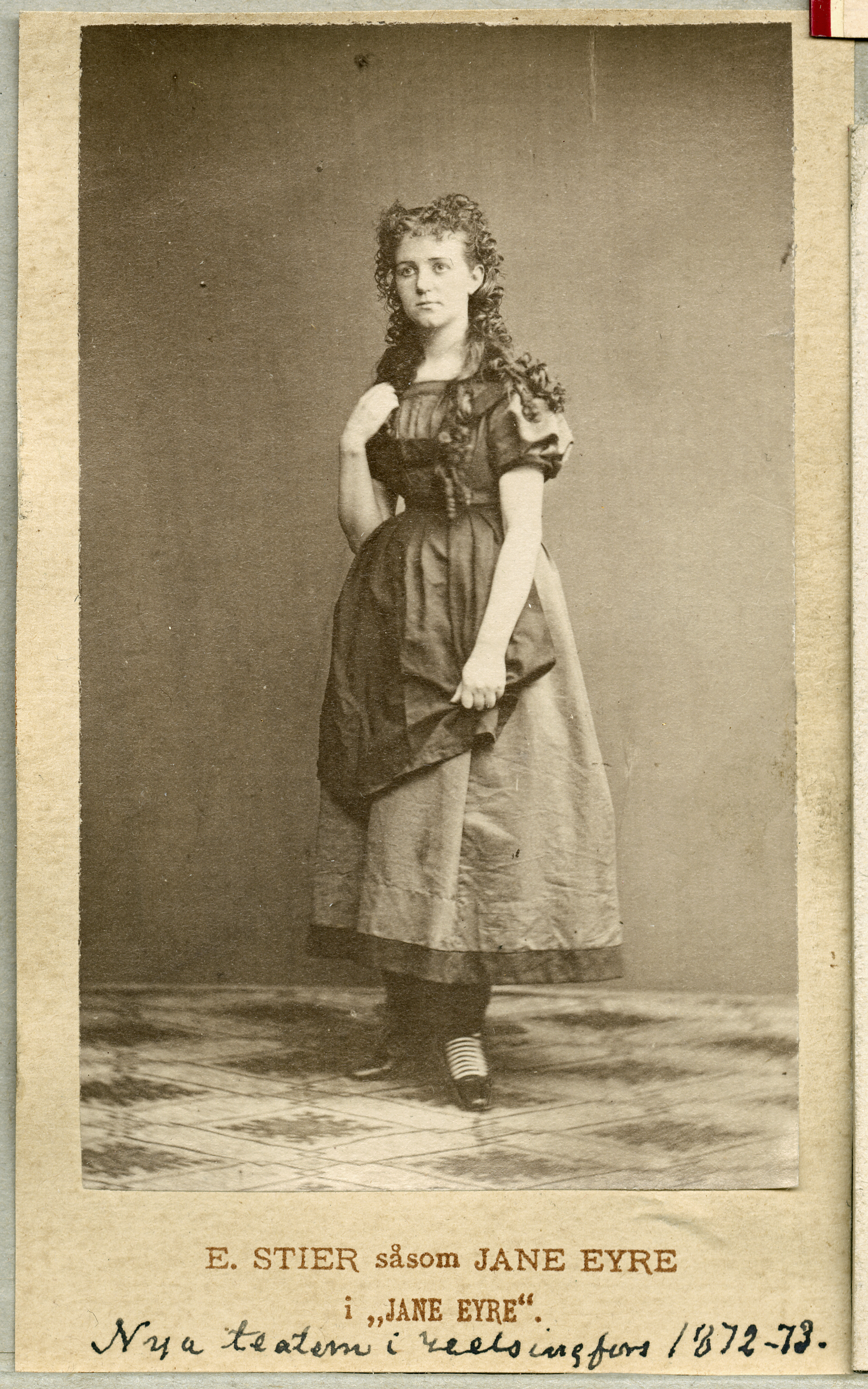
Elise Stier as Jane Eyre at the Swedish Theatre (Nya Teatern) in Helsinki, 1872.

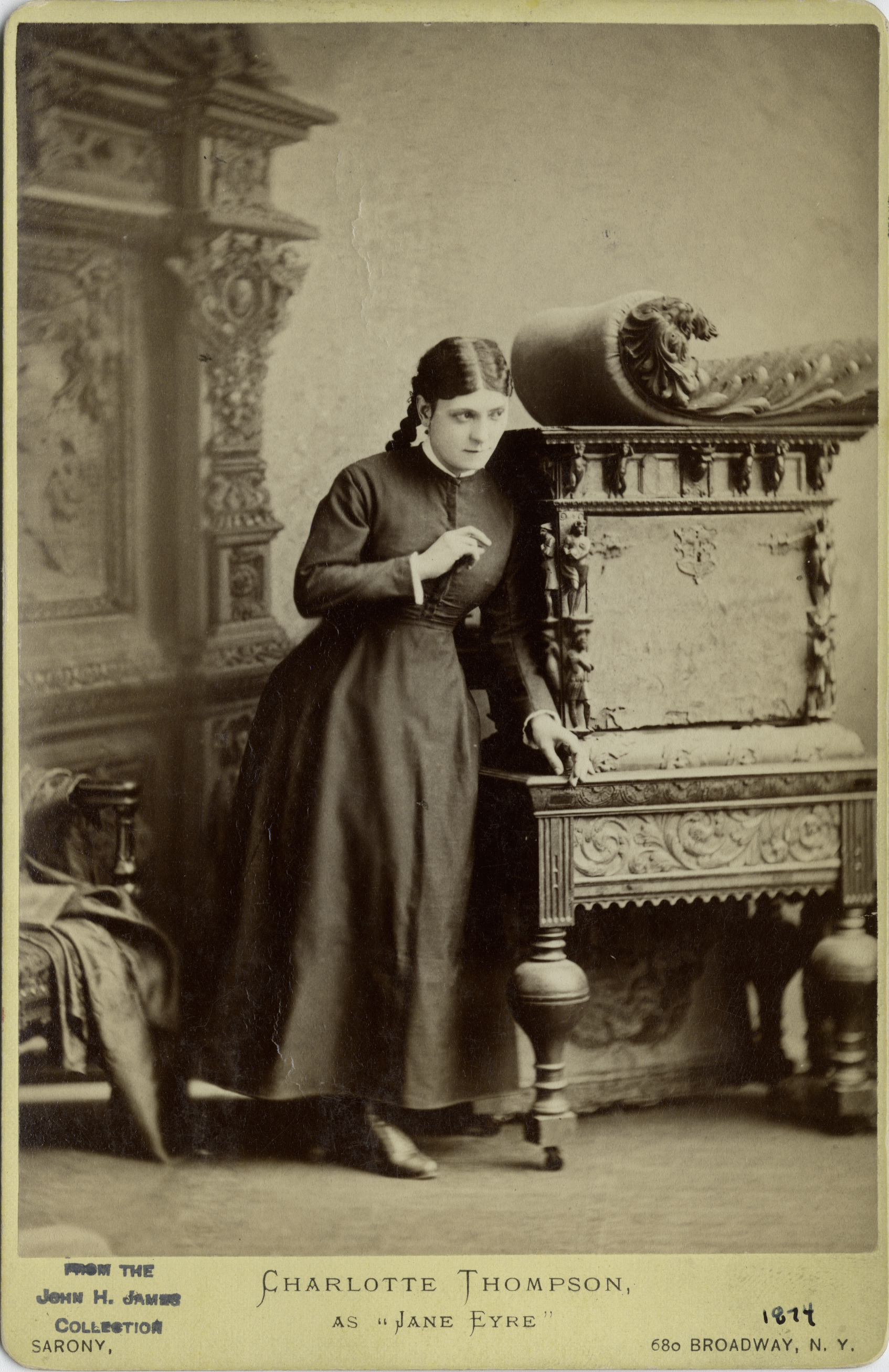
Charlotte Thompson as Jane Eyre in Charlotte Birch-Pfeiffer's stage adaptation (1874).

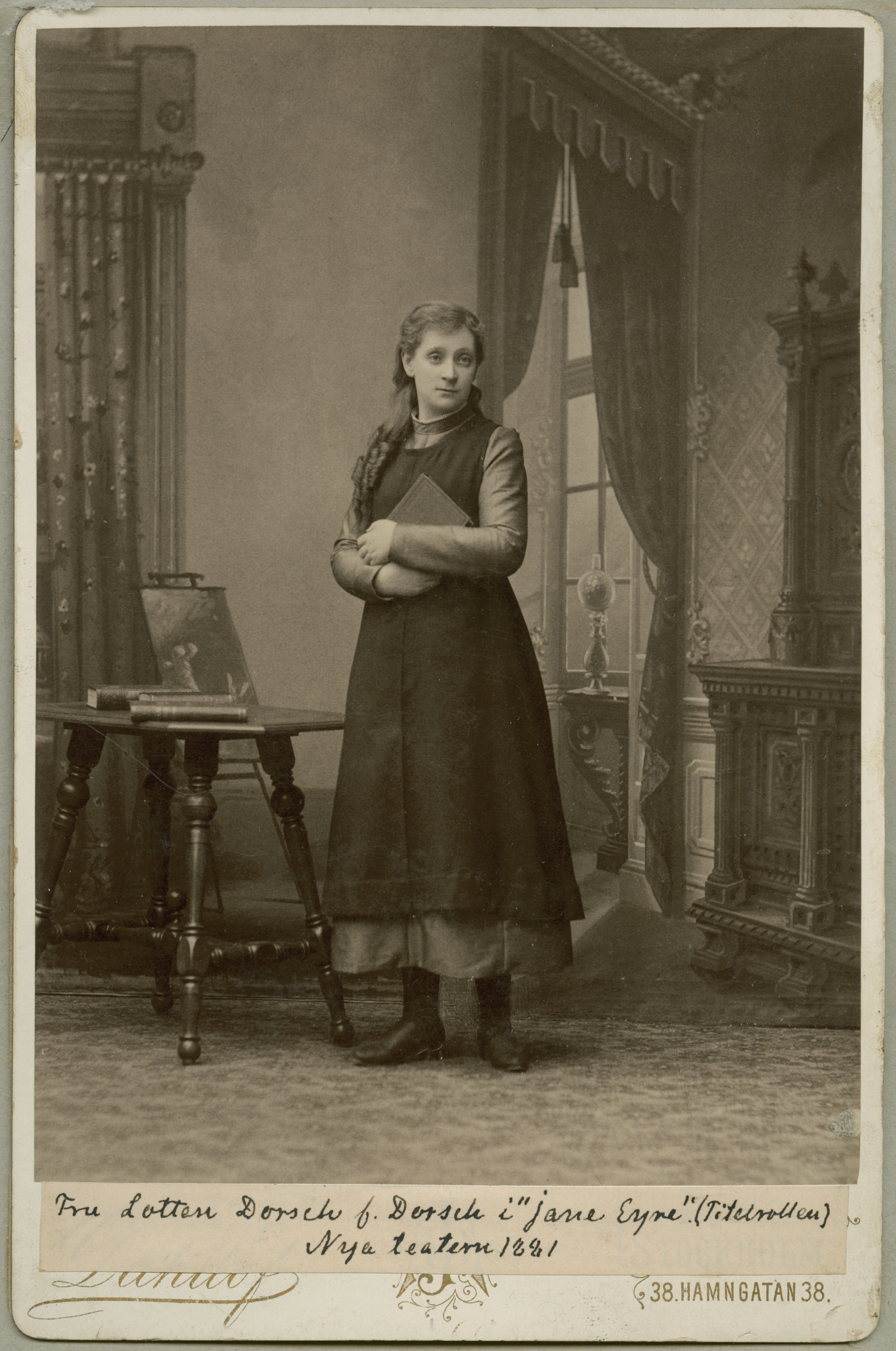
Lotten Dorsch in the title role of Jane Eyre at Nya Teatern in 1881.

== In other literature ==
The character of Jane Eyre features in much literature inspired by the novel, including prequels, sequels, rewritings and reinterpretations from different characters' perspectives.
