= Cosway =

Cosway is a surname. Notable people with the surname include:

- Maria Cosway (1760–1838), painter
- Richard Cosway (1742–1821), painter

== See also ==
- Cosway, Alberta
- Antoinette Cosway, a character in the novel Wide Sargasso Sea (a version of the Jane Eyre character Bertha Mason)
