= Jane Eyre (1996 film) =

1996 film directed by Franco Zeffirelli

- Theatrical release poster
- Directed by: Franco Zeffirelli
- Written by: Hugh Whitemore; Franco Zeffirelli
- Based on: Jane Eyre by Charlotte Brontë
- Produced by: Dyson Lovell
- Starring: William Hurt; Charlotte Gainsbourg; Joan Plowright; Anna Paquin; Geraldine Chaplin; Billie Whitelaw; Maria Schneider
- Cinematography: David Watkin
- Edited by: Richard Marden
- Music by: Claudio Capponi; Alessio Vlad
- Production companies: Miramax Films; Cineritino S.r.L. Flach Film; Mediaset; RCS Editori S.p.A. Rochester
- Distributed by: Warner Bros. (France); United International Pictures (Italy and Hungary); Guild Pathé Cinema (United Kingdom); Miramax Films (United States)
- Release date: April 12, 1996 (United States)
- Running time: 116 minutes
- Countries: Italy; United Kingdom; United States; France
- Languages: English; French
- Box office: $5,200,601

Jane Eyre is a 1996 romantic drama film adaptation of Charlotte Brontë's 1847 novel Jane Eyre. This Hollywood version, directed by Franco Zeffirelli, is similar to the original novel, although it compresses and eliminates most of the plot in the last quarter of the book (the running away, the trials and tribulations, new-found relations, and new job) to condense it into a two-hour film.

== Plot ==
Jane Eyre (portrayed as the orphan girl by Anna Paquin and as an independent woman by Charlotte Gainsbourg) is a plain, impoverished lady hired by Mr. Rochester (William Hurt) through Mrs. Fairfax (Joan Plowright) to work as a governess for Adèle (Josephine Serre). Despite her mild unprepossessing nun-like manner, Jane has strong hidden passions and shows her strong character by expressing her opinions and showing resolve in times of trouble. Rochester is a Byronic anti-hero, tortured and tormented by family troubles, past injustices and secrets. Rochester and Jane develop a mutual affinity. They fall in love and the marriage date is set. What Jane does not realize is that she must share the estate and, ultimately, Mr. Rochester with his wife, Bertha (Maria Schneider), who is mentally ill and is confined in an upstairs attic with a nurse, Grace Poole (Billie Whitelaw).

The marriage is stopped by Bertha's brother Richard Mason (Edward de Souza) and lawyer Briggs (Peter Woodthorpe). Jane flees; her world in ruins. She recovers in the parsonage, her aunt's original home, and discovers she is now wealthy through inheriting her long-lost uncle's fortune in Madeira. She receives a proposal of marriage from Parson St. John Rivers, but her heart and soul are with Rochester. Jane goes back to find Rochester's house, Thornfield Hall, burnt down and Rochester crippled and blinded by a fire set by Bertha, who perished. However, Jane's love for Rochester is undiminished; she nurses him back to health, he recovers his eyesight, and they marry.

== Cast ==
- Charlotte Gainsbourg as Jane Eyre
  - Anna Paquin as Young Jane Eyre
- William Hurt as Edward Fairfax Rochester
- Fiona Shaw as Mrs Reed
- John Wood as Mr. Brocklehurst
- Geraldine Chaplin as Miss Scatcherd
- Amanda Root as Miss Temple
- Leanne Rowe as Helen Burns
- Richard Warwick as John
- Joan Plowright as Mrs Fairfax
- Judith Parker as Leah
- Josephine Serre as Adèle Varens
- Billie Whitelaw as Grace Poole
- Elle Macpherson as Blanche Ingram
- Julian Fellowes as Colonel Dent
- Edward de Souza as Richard Mason
- Peter Woodthorpe as Briggs
- Ralph Nossek as Reverend Wood
- Maria Schneider as Bertha Mason
- Samuel West as St. John Rivers
- Charlotte Attenborough as Mary Rivers

== Production ==
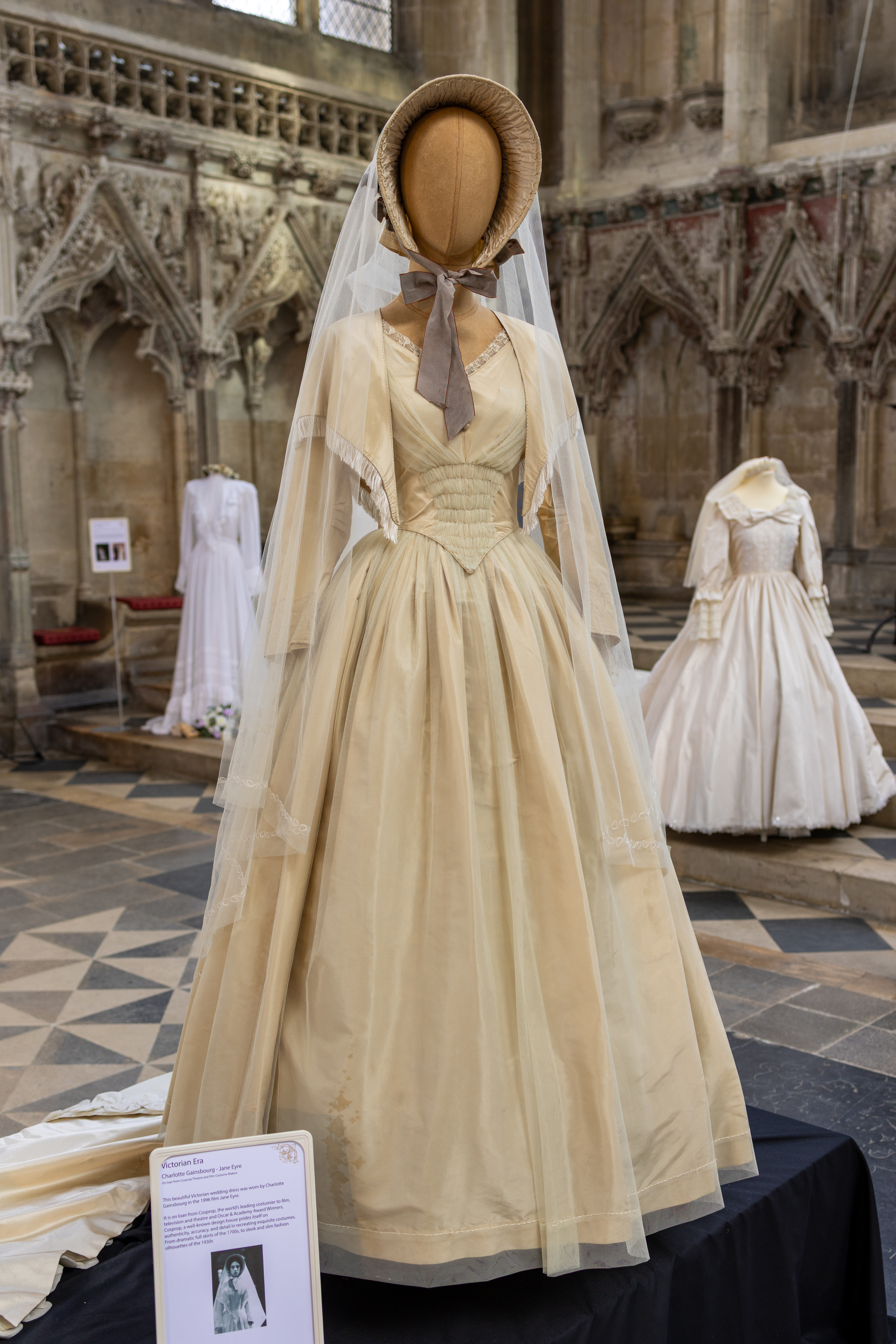
Wedding dress worn by Charlotte Gainsbourg in the film

The location for Thornfield Hall is Haddon Hall, Bakewell, Derbyshire, UK. Since Zeffirelli's use of Haddon Hall, subsequent versions of Jane Eyre have used it and it is now apparently synonymous with Thornfield Hall. Prior to Zeffirelli's location use, Haddon Hall had been once used (before Jane Eyre) as the castle for The Princess Bride.

== Release ==
The film was released on VHS and DVD by Miramax on February 24, 2003. The film debuted on the Blu-ray format for the first time on September 11, 2012, in a double feature with Becoming Jane (2007), released by Echo Bridge Entertainment.

== Reception ==
The film holds a positive rating of 75% at Rotten Tomatoes based on 28 reviews. The New York Times called Hurt "embarrassingly miscast as a Rochester more nearly a mild eccentric than a brooding, Byronic type", but conceded that the film "has its moments".
