= Jane Eyre (1973 TV series) =

1973 BBC television film

- DVD cover
- Written by: Jane Eyre by Charlotte Brontë
- Screenplay by: Robin Chapman
- Directed by: Joan Craft
- Starring: Sorcha Cusack; Michael Jayston
- Original languages: English; French
- No. of episodes: 5

Production
- Producer: John Mcrae
- Running time: 275 minutes

Original release
- Release: 27 September – 25 October 1973

Charlotte Brontë's novel Jane Eyre (1847) has been the subject of numerous television and film adaptations. This 1973 four-hour literary version was originally broadcast as a five-part BBC television drama serial. It was directed by Joan Craft and starred Sorcha Cusack and Michael Jayston.

== Plot ==
=== Episode One ===
Ten-year-old Jane Eyre is an orphan living at Gateshead Hall with her aunt by marriage, Mrs. Reed, and her children. John, her chief tormentor, along with his siblings and mother, constantly remind her of her dependent state. Eventually Jane is sent to Lowood Institution, where Mr. Brocklehurst embezzles funds for food and clothing and children are underfed. Helen Burns mentors her on how to get along and curb her rebellious streak. The school is quarantined in a typhoid epidemic. Conditions improve somewhat after the doctor blames Brocklehurst for poor conditions—the lack of food, wretched water, scant clothing—causing the students’ illness. Helen Burns dies of consumption in Jane's arms, believing that she is going to a better world.

Jane spends six years as a student and two as a teacher at the Lowood Institution. Applying for a position at Thornfield, she is hired by housekeeper Mrs. Fairfax as governess to Adele Varens, Mr. Edward Rochester's ward, the daughter of his former French paramour. While walking one evening, Jane encounters a gentleman on horseback whose horse stumbles and throws him. Unaware that this is Rochester, her employer, she helps the injured man to his feet.

=== Episode Two ===
The next morning Jane learns that the horseman of the night before is her employer, Edward Rochester. Over two evenings, Rochester questions Jane pointedly to learn about her upbringing at Lowood, ability at the piano, conversational skill, and spirited character. He asks Jane to agree to dispense with formalities because of his 20 years of superiority in life experience. She replies that his claim to superiority must depend on his use of his advantages, but she reminds him that she is his paid subordinate. Because he cares that a dependent is comfortable in dependency, however, she agrees to dispense with formalities. When he whines that adversity threw him on the wrong course at 21, turning him desperate then degenerate, she suggests reformation. When he asserts that he has new inspiration, she urges caution. When he says that unheard of circumstances require unheard of rules, she calls it a dangerous maxim.

While in bed Jane hears strange noises―pitiful sobs alternating with cackling laughter. Curious, Jane peers into the hall and spots smoke coming from Rochester's bedroom. His bed curtains are on fire, and he is asleep. She throws water from a pitcher to wake him and douse the fire. She tells Rochester of the strange laugh, and he tells her it is “Grace Poole,” a servant. Taking Jane's hand, Rochester thanks her for saving his life, saying he is pleased to be in her debt.

=== Episode Three ===
The next day Grace Poole acts strangely casual while mending the burnt curtains, and Jane is puzzled about Grace's attitude and continued presence. Rochester brings a neighbor's house party to stay at Thornfield. At the evening's soiree, Jane sees the beautiful but haughty Blanche Ingram flatter and flirt with Rochester. Dispirited, Jane slips out of the party. Rochester follows Jane and insists that she attend the other evenings. Jane now realizes that she is in love with Rochester, who is likely to marry Blanche.

When Rochester ostensibly is absent on business, Mr. Mason, from Jamaica, arrives. An "old gypsy" also arrives who tells the fortunes of the women, who are astonished that the gypsy knows all about them. The gypsy tells Jane that she must reach out and grasp her fortune. Jane laughs, recognizing Rochester in costume. The merriment ends when Jane informs him of Mason's presence. That night Rochester summons Jane to the attic, where Mason lies wounded and bloody, teeth marks among his wounds. Rochester scolds Mason for attempting to "see her" alone.

Jane is summoned to attend to Mrs. Reed, who has had a stroke. Though Rochester is reluctant to let her attend someone who cast her off, Jane complies with Mrs. Reed's dying wish. Mrs. Reed informs Jane that her uncle in Madeira, John Eyre, sent a letter 3 years before inquiring about her. Mrs. Reed had written back that Jane was dead but now confesses her deceit.

=== Episode Four ===
Jane returns to Thornfield, greeted by Rochester, who chides her for staying away a month. Jane says he must have been too busy planning his wedding to miss her, but she is glad to be back home. That evening in the garden, Rochester laments that conditions will change at Thornfield when he marries. Believing he will marry Blanche, Jane abandons caution, declaring that she has the right to tell him, soul to soul, how devastated she is at the prospect. If she had been gifted with status, she would make it as difficult for him to leave her—equal as they are in spirit. When Rochester asks Jane to marry him, she believes he is mocking her. He convinces her that he is serious, declaring her his equal, and she accepts. He confesses to having used Blanche Ingram to make her jealous so she would fall in love with him. Hoping to bring some small fortune to Rochester upon her marriage, Jane writes a letter to her uncle in Madeira.

A month later, on her wedding day, Jane is awakened by a dark figure who tears her wedding veil before departing. At the wedding ceremony, Mason appears, denouncing the intended marriage and announcing that Rochester has a living wife, his sister. Rochester takes the officiants to the attic to see his wife, the former Bertha Mason, of Spanish Town, Jamaica, daughter of three insane generations, who he was tricked by the two families to marry for her fortune when he was a young man. When his father and elder brother died, Rochester shut up his insane wife at Thornfield, keeping her a secret, with Grace Poole to care for her. Jane's letter to her uncle prompted him to send Mason to stop the fraudulent marriage. Jane forgives Rochester for his deceit but leaves Thornfield.

=== Episode Five ===
Traveling 60 miles from Thornfield, Jane loses her belongings in her distracted state. Destitute, Jane arrives at the home of the Rivers family. There, using the name “Jane Elliott”, she meets St. John Rivers, a minister who takes her in with his sisters Diana and Mary. Rivers arranges for Jane to teach at a poor local school. Rivers sees Jane's signature “Jane Eyre” on a slip of paper. Making inquiries, he learns of Jane's past, including her time at Thornfield. Rivers informs Jane that her uncle, John Eyre, has died and left her his entire fortune. He informs her that John Eyre was also his uncle and that they are cousins. Jane declares that she will divide the inheritance equally among herself and her three cousins. Deeming her intelligent, hard-working, and fit to be his assistant in missionary work in India, Rivers offers to marry her. Jane cannot see herself as his wife, unloved, valued only for use in missionary work. As she struggles against Rivers's persistence, Jane imagines she hears Rochester calling out to her. She decides to go to Thornfield to determine the state of affairs.

Jane finds Thornfield a ruin, destroyed in a devastating fire set by Bertha Rochester, who subsequently flung herself from the battlements to the ground. Trying to rescue Bertha, Rochester was blinded, maimed in his left arm and losing his left hand. Rochester now resides at a manor house, 13 miles away. Jane presents herself to the dispirited Rochester, convincing him that she still loves him and wishes to marry him in his present state. Her assurances revive his spirit. They marry and Rochester eventually regains his vision in one eye, able to see his child when his son is born.

== Cast ==
- Sorcha Cusack as Jane Eyre
- Juliet Waley as young Jane
- Michael Jayston as Edward Rochester
- Megs Jenkins as Mrs. Fairfax
- Stephanie Beacham as Blanche Ingram
- Brenda Kempner as Bertha Rochester
- Isabelle Rosin as Adele
- Geoffrey Whitehead as St. John Rivers
- Tina Heath as Helen Burns
- Ann Tirard as Miss Scatcherd

== Reception ==
Henry Mitchell in a 21 July 1982 review for The Washington Post noted of the mini-series that "At its best, it sounds like Jane Austen through a glass darkly and that is very good indeed." Richard Shepard's 21 July 1982 review for The New York Times was mixed, noting (of its highly literary style) that the production "is impeccably done, to judge from the first part, and appears to be faithful to the book, but perhaps because of this faithfulness it does not catch fire. It is an enactment from the book, and one must judge for oneself whether to honor or deprecate it for its literary fidelity." Shepard offers high praise of the cast, stating that, "as its heroine, Sorcha Cusack makes an uncommonly strong, yet reserved, Jane. She is not pretty but has a quiet beauty enhanced by a slight smile and an expression that is attractively quizzical. Her soft voice supplies bridging text from the book between scenes. Michael Jayston is craggily handsome and strong and more theatrical in his portrayal of Rochester, the imperious, troubled master whose service she enters and whose heart she captures."

== DVD ==
The DVD for this series is available, distributed by Acorn Media UK.
