= Jane Eyre (1934 film) =

1934 film by Christy Cabanne

- Theatrical release poster
- Directed by: Christy Cabanne
- Written by: Adele Comandini
- Based on: Jane Eyre by Charlotte Brontë
- Produced by: Ben Verschleiser
- Starring: Virginia Bruce; Colin Clive
- Cinematography: Robert Planck
- Edited by: Carl Pierson
- Music by: Mischa Bakaleinikoff (uncredited); Abe Meyer (uncredited)
- Production company: Monogram Pictures
- Distributed by: Monogram Pictures
- Release date: August 15, 1934
- Running time: 62 minutes
- Country: United States
- Language: English

Jane Eyre is a 1934 American romantic drama film directed by Christy Cabanne, starring Virginia Bruce and Colin Clive. It is based on the 1847 novel Jane Eyre by Charlotte Brontë, and is the first adaptation to use sound.

== Plot ==
A Victorian orphan secures a position as governess at Thornfield Hall. She falls in love with her employer.

== Cast ==
- Virginia Bruce as Jane Eyre
- Colin Clive as Edward Rochester
- Beryl Mercer as Mrs. Fairfax
- David Torrence as Mr. Brocklehurst
- Aileen Pringle as Lady Blanche Ingram
- Edith Fellows as Adele Rochester
- John Rogers as Sam Poole
- Jean Darling as Jane Eyre as a Child
- Lionel Belmore as Lord Ingram
- Jameson Thomas as Charles Craig
- Ethel Griffies as Grace Poole
- Claire Du Brey as Bertha Rochester
- William Burress as Minister
- Joan Standing as Daisy
- Richard Quine as John Reed
- Desmond Roberts as Dr. John Rivers (uncredited)
- Olaf Hytten as Jeweler (uncredited)
- Clarissa Selwynne as Mrs. Reed (uncredited)

== Production ==
Production began 17 May 1934 at General Service Studios.

== Critical reception ==
Critic Leonard Maltin gave the film 2 stars (out of four), describing it as a "[t]hin version of the oft-filmed Bronte novel, produced by Monogram, of all studios[...] Still, it's not uninteresting as a curio."

== Soundtrack ==
- Adele sings the "Bridal Chorus" from the opera Lohengrin, by Richard Wagner.
- Adele sings "My Bonnie Lies over the Ocean".
