= Jane Eyre (1956 TV series) =

1956 British TV series

- Genre: Period drama
- Based on: Jane Eyre by Charlotte Brontë
- Screenplay by: Constance Cox; Ian Dallas
- Directed by: Campbell Logan
- Starring: Stanley Baker; Daphne Slater
- Country of origin: United Kingdom
- Original language: English
- No. of episodes: 6 (list of episodes)

Production
- Running time: 30 minutes

Original release
- Network: BBC tv
- Release: 24 February – 29 March 1956

Jane Eyre is a six-part 1956 British TV adaptation of the 1847 novel by Charlotte Brontë. Unlike most BBC programming of the 1950s, the series survives intact, but had not been shown publicly in decades beyond a single 55 second clip on BBC iPlayer, until a complete bootlegged copy of all six episodes was uploaded to YouTube on 5 June 2025.

== Cast ==
- Daphne Slater as Jane Eyre
- Stanley Baker as Edward Rochester
- Philip Howard as Footman John
- Dorothy Black as The Mad Woman
