= Tamil Nadu State Film Award for Best Male Playback Singer =

Indian film award

The Tamil Nadu State Film Award for Best Male Playback Singer is given by the state government as part of its annual Tamil Nadu State Film Awards for Tamil (Kollywood) films. K. J. Yesudas has won the award a record five times, followed by SPB, who has bagged it four times.

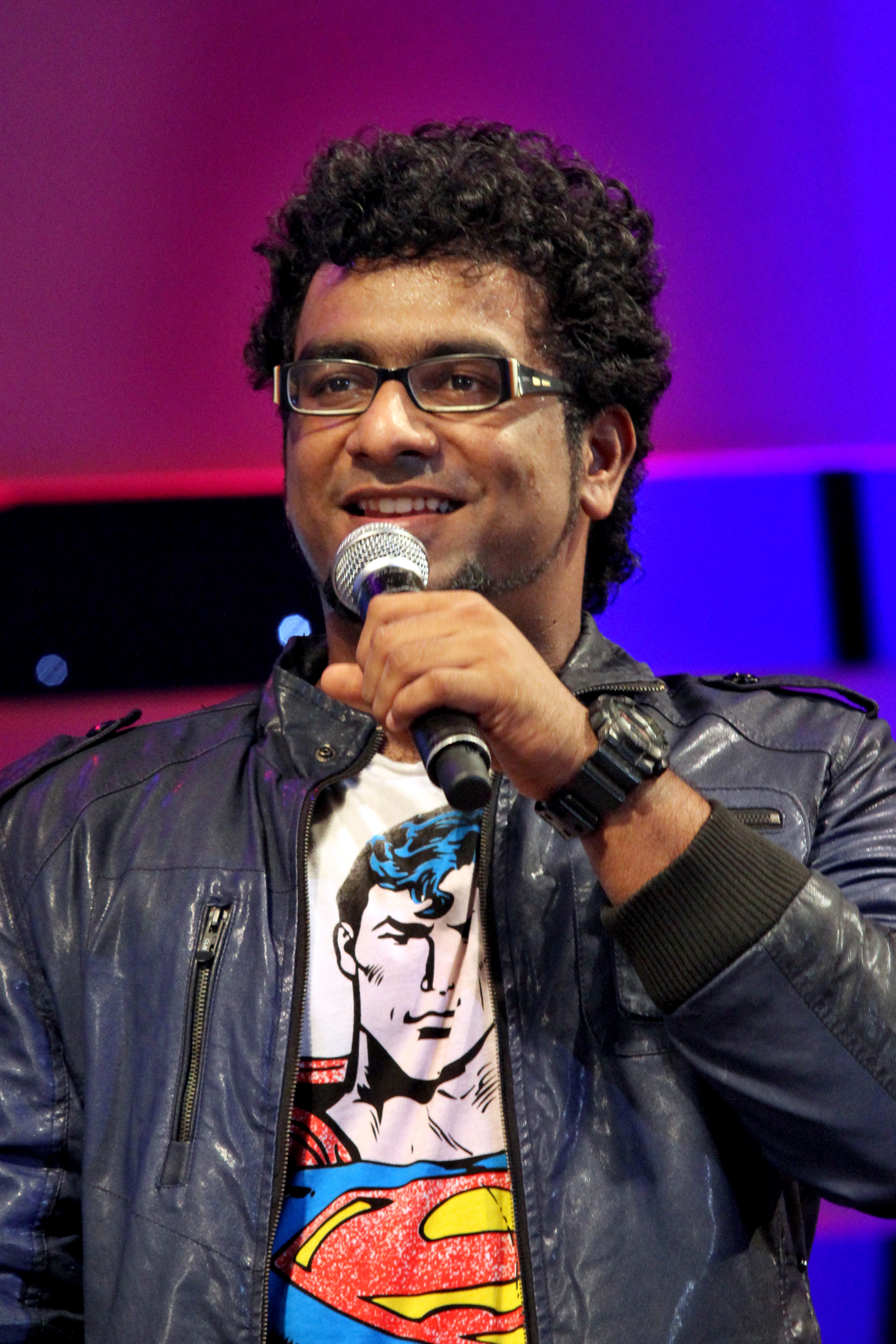
Latest winner Haricharan

== Superlative ==
- K. J. Yesudas - 5
- S. P. Balasubrahmaniam - 4
- Haricharan - 4

== Recipients ==
Here is a list of the award winners and the films for which they won.

Year	Singer	Song	Film(s)
1968	T. M. Soundararajan		Kudiyirundha Koyil, Lakshmi Kalyanam
1969	S. P. Balasubrahmanyam		Adimaippen, Shanti Nilayam
1970	Seerkazhi Govindarajan		Thirumalai Thenkumari
1977-78	K. J. Yesudas		Andaman Kathali, Madhuraiyai Meetta Sundharapandiyan
1978-79	Malaysia Vasudevan		Kizhake Pogum Rail
1979-80	T. M. Soundararajan		Thisai Maariya Paravigal
1980-81	S. P. Balasubrahmanyam		Nizhalgal
1981-82	K. J. Yesudas	Kanne Kalaimane	Moondram Pirai
1982-83	Deepan Chakravarthy		Kathal Oviyam
1983	No Award		
1984	No Award		
1985	No Award		
1986	No Award		
1987	No Award		
1988	K. J. Yesudas		Multiple films
1989	K. J. Yesudas		Nyaya Tharasu
1990	S. P. Balasubrahmanyam	"Mannil Enda Kadhal"	Keladi Kanmani
1991	Mano	"Thuliyela"	Chinna Thambi
1992	K. J. Yesudas	"Amma Endrazhaikatha"	Mannan
1993	Jayachandran	"Kathhalangattu Vazhi"	Kizhakku Cheemayile
1994	S. P. Balasubrahmanyam		Jai Hind
1995	Hariharan	"Konjum Naal"	Aasai
1996	Unni Menon	"Maana Madhurai"	Minsaara Kanavu
1997	Krishnaraj	"Tanjavoor Mannu"	Porkkaalam
1998	Malaysia Vasudevan	"Yennadi Nee"	En Aasai Rasave
1999	Srinivas	"Minsara Poove"	Padayappa
2000	Harish Raghavendra	"Nirpathuve Nadapathuve"	Bharathi
2001	P. Unnikrishnan	"Un Samayal Arayil"	Dhill
2002	Unni Menon	"Yaar Intha Devathai", "Enge andha vennila"	Unnai Ninaithu, Varushamellam Vasantham
2003	P. Unnikrishnan	"Chinna Chinna"	Ramachandra
2004	Hariharan	Multiple movies	
2005	Sriram Parthasarathy	"Suttum Vizhi Choodare"	Ghajini
2006	Madhu Balakrishnan	"Pesaa madandhaiye"	Mozhi
2007	Srinivas	"Maarghazhiyil"	Onbadhu Roobai Nottu
2008	Belly Raj	"Kangal Erandaal"	Subramaniyapuram
2009	M. Balamuralikrishna	"Anbaale Azhagaaguml"	Pasanga
2010	Karthik	"Usure Pogudhey"	Raavanan
2011	Haricharan	"Aariro"	Deiva Thirumagal
2012	Ranjith	"Sollitaley Ava Kaadhala"	Kumki
2013	S. P. Charan	"Enakkaaga Poranthaayae" "Onakkaga Poranthaenae",	Pannaiyarum Padminiyum
2014	Haricharan	• "Vaanga Makka Vaanga" • "Aye Mr. Minor!" • "Sandi Kuthirai" • "Alli Arjuna"	Kaaviya Thalaivan
2015	Gana Bala	'Vandha Kadha"	Vai Raja Vai
2016	Velmurugan	"Vaa Machchi"	Oru Kuppai Kathai
2017	Sathyaprakash	"Nee Paarkkum"	Thiruttu Payale 2
2018	Sid Sriram	Various	Multiple films
2019	Haricharan	Various	Multiple films
2020	Amresh Ganesh		Sandakkari
2021	Arivu	"Power"	Jai Bhim
2022	Haricharan	"Bejara"	Iravin Nizhal

== See also ==
- Tamil cinema
- Cinema of India
