= Jane Eyre (1997 film) =

1997 British television film

- Based on: Jane Eyre by Charlotte Brontë
- Written by: Richard Hawley; Kay Mellor; Peter Wright
- Directed by: Robert Young
- Starring: Samantha Morton; Ciarán Hinds; Gemma Jones; Rupert Penry-Jones
- Music by: Richard Harvey
- Country of origin: United Kingdom
- Original language: English

Production
- Producer: Greg Brenman
- Cinematography: John McGlashan
- Editor: Anthony Ham
- Running time: 108 minutes

Original release
- Network: ITV
- Release: 9 March 1997

Jane Eyre is a 1997 British television film produced by London Weekend Television, that first broadcast on ITV and stars Samantha Morton in the title role. It is an adaptation of Charlotte Brontë's 1847 novel of the same name.

This version of the story is noted for omitting the middle scenes with Mrs Reed, the Rivers' relationship to Jane, and her paternal uncle's inheritance from his estate in Madeira. It was originally shown on ITV on 9 March 1997 in the UK and shown on A&E on 19 October 1997 in the US. It is sometimes repeated on ITV3.

== Cast ==
- Samantha Morton as Jane Eyre
- Ciarán Hinds as Edward Fairfax Rochester
- Laura Harling as Young Jane
- Rupert Penry-Jones as St. John Rivers
- Gemma Jones as Mrs. Alice Fairfax
- Timia Berthome as Adele
- David Gant as Mr. Brocklehurst
- Abigail Cruttenden as Blanche Ingram
- Ben Sowden as John Reed
- Deborah Findlay as Mrs. Reed
- Kay Mellor as Mrs. Butterworth
- Sophie Reissner as Bertha Rochester
