= Judith Parker =

British judge

Dame Judith Parker DBE

Justice of the High Court
- In office 13 June 2008 – 2 July 2019

Personal details
- Born: Judith Mary Frances Parker; 19 June 1950 (age 76)
- Citizenship: United Kingdom
- Education: Somerville College, Oxford

Dame Judith Mary Frances Parker, DBE (born 19 June 1950) is a retired British judge and barrister. From 2008 to 2019, she was a Justice of the High Court of England and Wales.

== Early life and education ==
Judith Parker was born on 19 June 1950. She studied Jurisprudence at Somerville College, Oxford, and graduated with a Bachelor of Arts degree in 1972.

Parker is an Honorary Fellow of Somerville College.

== Legal career ==
In 1973, Parker was called to the Bar by Middle Temple. She then specialised in family law. On 9 April 1991, she was appointed Queen's Counsel (QC).

=== Judiciary ===
Between 1998 and 2000, Parker served as an assistant recorder (i.e. a part-time judge). On 7 March 2000, she was appointed a Master of the Bench of Middle Temple. On 18 July 2000, she was appointed a Recorder, and served as a part-time judge on the South Eastern Circuit.

On 13 June 2008, Parker was appointed a Judge assigned to the Family Division of the High Court of Justice. She was appointed Dame Commander of the Order of the British Empire (DBE) shortly after being appointed. In 2018, during an unknown hearing, she dozed off momentarily, for which she was given official advice. She retired shortly after.
