= Karen E. Rowe =

American literary critic and academic

- Born: 1945 (age 80–81)
- Education: Indiana University; Mount Holyoke College
- Occupation: Professor at UCLA
- Writing career
- Genres: Renaissance literature Women's studies
- Notable work: Saint And Singer : Edward Taylor's Typology And The Poetics Of Meditation

Karen E. Rowe (born 1945) is an American literary critic and a specialist in Renaissance literature. She is a professor of English at UCLA.

== Background ==
Rowe received her B.A. from Mount Holyoke College and Ph.D. from Indiana University.

== Awards ==
- UCLA Distinguished Teaching Award, 1982.
- Fellow of the Bryn Mawr/HERS Mid-Atlantic Institute for Women in Higher Education Administration, 1986.
- Executive Committee, Division on American Literature to 1800, Modern Language Association, 1989–94.
- Chair of the Division and MLA Program, 1992.
- Graduated from The American University in Cairo with highest honors 1966.
- Editorial Board Member, Early American Literature, 1987–1990.

== Selected bibliography ==
- Rowe, Karen E. (1986). Saint and singer: Edward Taylor's typology and the poetics of meditation. Cambridge Cambridgeshire New York: Cambridge University Press. ISBN 9780521308656.
- Rowe, Karen E. (2014), "Edward Taylor", in Lauter, Paul (ed.), The Heath anthology of American literature: volume A, beginnings to 1800, Heath Anthology of American Literature Series (7th ed.), Boston, Massachusetts: Cengage Learning, pp. 366–407, ISBN 9781133310228.
- Rowe, Karen E.; Kim, Byong-suh (June 1997). "The rise of women's education in the United States and Korea: a struggle for educational and occupational equality". Asian Journal of Women's Studies. 3 (2): 30–93. doi:10.1080/12259276.1997.11665795. Archived from the original on January 18, 2016. Pdf.
- Rowe, Karen E. (1986), "To spin a yarn: the female voice in folklore and fairy tale", in Ruth B., Bottigheimer (ed.), Fairy tales and society, University of Pennsylvania Press, pp. 53–74, ISBN 9780812212945.
- Rowe, Karen E. (1983), ""Fairy-born and human-bred": Jane Eyre's education in romance", in Abel, Elizabeth; Hirsch, Marianne; Langland, Elizabeth (eds.), The Voyage in: fictions of female development, Hanover, New Hampshire: Published for Dartmouth College by University Press of New England, pp. 69–89, ISBN 9780874512502.
- Rowe, Karen E. (January 1979). "Feminism and fairy tales". Women's Studies. 6 (3): 237–257. doi:10.1080/00497878.1979.9978487.
