= Jane Eyre (1970 film) =

- Original Movie Poster
- Directed by: Delbert Mann
- Screenplay by: Jack Pulman
- Based on: Jane Eyre by Charlotte Brontë
- Produced by: Omnibus Productions
- Starring: George C. Scott; Susannah York; Ian Bannen; Jack Hawkins; Nyree Dawn Porter; Rachel Kempson; Kenneth Griffith; Ken Barrie
- Cinematography: Paul Beeson
- Edited by: Peter Boita
- Music by: John Williams
- Distributed by: British Lion Film Corporation
- Release date: December 1970
- Running time: 110 minutes
- Country: United Kingdom
- Language: English
- Budget: $1.6 million

Jane Eyre is a 1970 British film directed by Delbert Mann, starring George C. Scott and Susannah York. It is based on the 1847 novel Jane Eyre by Charlotte Brontë. The film had its theatrical debut in the United Kingdom in 1970 and was released on television by NBC in the United States in 1971.

== Plot ==
Jane Eyre is an orphan raised by her tormentingly abusive aunt and cousins until she is sent to Lowood School, where cruelty is an education strategy. The headmaster reminds the students that "God saw fit to make them orphans." Jane's best friend, who had tuberculosis (called "consumption" in those days), was forced to stand in the rain as punishment and died the next day.

On leaving, Jane takes a position as governess to a girl named Adele at Thornfield Hall. Her employer, Edward Rochester, explains that Adele is not his daughter, but that of a man who ran off with Rochester's wife.

One night, Jane rescues Edward from a fire in his bed; he is moved that she saved his life. Jane wonders who left a candle burning on the floor outside her room.

Edward goes away to court a beautiful woman and Jane is heartbroken. He returns with the woman and an entourage. A man named Mason arrives and Edward confides in Jane that Mason could ruin his standing in society.

During the night, all are awakened by shrieks. Edward tells them a servant had a bad dream, but reveals to Jane that Mason was attacked by an insane former employee living in the attic. He escorts Mason out of Thornfield to a doctor.

When the guests leave, Edward declares his love and proposes to an initially disbelieving Jane in the garden of another property, and she accepts. However, during the ceremony, Mason returns and announces that Rochester is already married - to Mason’s sister, who was the insane woman in the attic.

Jane decides to leave rather than be the mistress of a married man, but Edward begs her to stay. While he sleeps, Jane leaves Thornfield and gets stranded on the moors. She is rescued by a minister, St John, and his two sisters. Jane teaches the local children. St John suggests they marry and travel to India to better serve God. However, Jane realises St John does not love her, and that she can only love God by experiencing human love.

Jane returns to Thornhill, but discovers the mansion is now a burnt shell. One of Edward's servants tells her Rochester’s wife started a fire, but died in the blaze. As the building collapsed, Edward was injured and blinded.

Not repelled by Edward's injuries, Jane meets him in the garden of the other property, gradually revealing her identity, and they rekindle their love.

== Cast ==
- George C. Scott as Edward Rochester
- Susannah York as Jane Eyre
- Sara Gibson as Jane Eyre as a child
- Ian Bannen as St. John Rivers
- Rachel Kempson as Mrs. Fairfax
- Nyree Dawn Porter as Blanche Ingram
- Jack Hawkins as Mr. Brocklehurst
- Jean Marsh as Mrs. Rochester
- Kenneth Griffith as Mason
- Angharad Rees as Louise
- Peter Copley as John
- Clive Morton as Mr. Eshton
- Jeremy Child as Harry Lynn
- Louise Pajo as Mary Lugram
- Michele Dotrice as Mary Rivers
- Rosalyn Landor as Helen Burns
- Stella Tanner as Grace Poole
- Ken Barrie as Edward Rochester (Singing voice)

== Production ==
The film was originally meant to star James Mason and the actresses mentioned for the title role were Rita Tushingham and Sinead Cusack.

Filming started 18 May 1970 in Yorkshire.

== Chinese release ==
In the 1980s, the movie was dubbed into Mandarin and widely released in China. The two leading voice actor and actress are Qiu Yuefeng (邱岳峰) and Li Zi (李梓). The dubbed version became dominant form by which the classic was known to the Chinese, with the dubbed monologues of the film becoming more widely recited than the original English. The dubbed version was also released on audio cassette tape, and the cassette version was more popular than the dubbed film.

== Awards ==
- 1972: Emmy Award - Outstanding Achievement in Music Composition (John Williams).

== Soundtrack ==
John Williams composed the score, recording it at Anvil Studios, Denham, outside London.

Jane Eyre: Limited Edition
No.	Title	Length
1.	"Love Theme from Jane Eyre"	3:15
2.	"Overture (Main Title)"	3:55
3.	"Lowood"	2:25
4.	"To Thornfield"	1:51
5.	"Festivity at Thornfield"	2:08
6.	"Grace Poole and Mason's Arrival"	3:00
7.	"Meeting"	3:07
8.	"Thwarted Wedding"	2:37
9.	"Across the Moors"	2:37
10.	"Restoration"	3:56
11.	"Reunion (End Title)"	4:22
