= Jane Eyre (1963 TV series) =

- Opening title
- Genre: Historical drama
- Based on: Jane Eyre by Charlotte Brontë
- Written by: Constance Cox
- Directed by: Rex Tucker
- Starring: Ann Bell; Richard Leech
- Composer: Tristram Cary
- Country of origin: United Kingdom
- Original language: English
- No. of series: 1
- No. of episodes: 6

Production
- Producer: Douglas Allen
- Running time: 25 minutes
- Production company: BBC

Original release
- Network: BBC TV
- Release: 7 April – 12 May 1963

Jane Eyre is a British six-part television series which first aired on the BBC in 1963. It is an adaptation of the 1847 novel of the same title by Charlotte Brontë.

The series is now complete after returns from the Hungarian archive, with 2 copies of episode 2 (one with Hungarian subtitles) confirmed by Kaleidoscope on 22/10/2025.

== Cast ==
- Ann Bell as Jane Eyre
- Richard Leech as Mr. Rochester
- Elsie Arnold as Mrs. Fairfax
- Stephanie Bidmead as Leah
- Nan Marriott-Watson as Grace Poole
- Elaine Pratt as Adèle
- Hira Talfrey as Mrs. Rochester
- Patricia Cree as Mary Ingram
- Brenda Dean as Mary Rivers
- William Devlin as Mr. Briggs
- Sonia Dresdel as Mrs. Reed
- Jane Eccles as Lady Ingram
- Alan Edwards as Lord Ingram
- Betty Hardy as Hannah
- Anthony Jacobs as Mr. Mason
- Arthur Lawrence as Colonel Dent
- Justine Lord as Blanche Ingram
- William Russell as St. John Rivers
- Penny Whittam as Diana Rivers
- Elizabeth Benzimra as Alice
- Michael Bilton as Landlord
- Rachel Clay as Jane Eyre as a child
- Mark Dignam as Mr. Brocklehurst
- Arthur Hewlett as Clergyman
- Marie Kean as Miss Miller
- Tonie MacMillan as Mrs. Brocklehurst
- Kika Markham as Helen Burns
- Jane Merrow as Rosamund Oliver
- Leonard Trolley as Doctor
- Margot Van der Burgh as Miss Temple
- Ann Way as Bessie
- Meadows White as John
- Joan Young as Nurse

== Bibliography ==
- Klossner, Michael. The Europe of 1500-1815 on Film and Television: A Worldwide Filmography of Over 2550 Works, 1895 Through 2000. McFarland & Company, 2002.
