= Ardiente secreto =

Mexican telenovela

- Daniela Romo & Joaquín Cordero
- Genre: Telenovela
- Created by: Original Story: Charlotte Brontë; Adaptation: Carlos Olmos
- Directed by: Julián Pastor
- Starring: Daniela Romo; Joaquín Cordero
- Country of origin: Mexico
- Original language: Spanish
- No. of episodes: 20

Production
- Executive producer: Irene Sabido
- Cinematography: Karlos Velázquez

Original release
- Network: Canal de las Estrellas
- Release: 1978 – 1978

Ardiente secreto is a Mexican telenovela produced by Irene Sabido for Televisa in 1978. It is based on the Charlotte Brontë's 1847 novel Jane Eyre.

== Plot ==
The orphan Mariana Cisneros was shut in (in a college) by an aunt who hates her, she suffers from some terrible pains, but she take advantage of the education and culture. When she turns 18 she finds a job as a governess of a silent and lonely child, Adela, who is the daughter of Eduardo. Mariana wins Adela's love and she is attracted by Eduardo. Mariana and Eduardo fall in love, but a terrible secret will take them apart. She discovers it on the day of their marriage. Mariana is desperate and she escapes, but for love she will return again.

== Cast ==
- Daniela Romo as Mariana
- Joaquín Cordero as Eduardo
- Lorena Velázquez
- Virginia Manzano
- Dolores Tinoco
- Patricia Tanus as Adela
- Ada Carrasco
- Eduardo Liñán
- Erika Carrasco as Mariana (child)
