= Woman and Wife =

1918 film

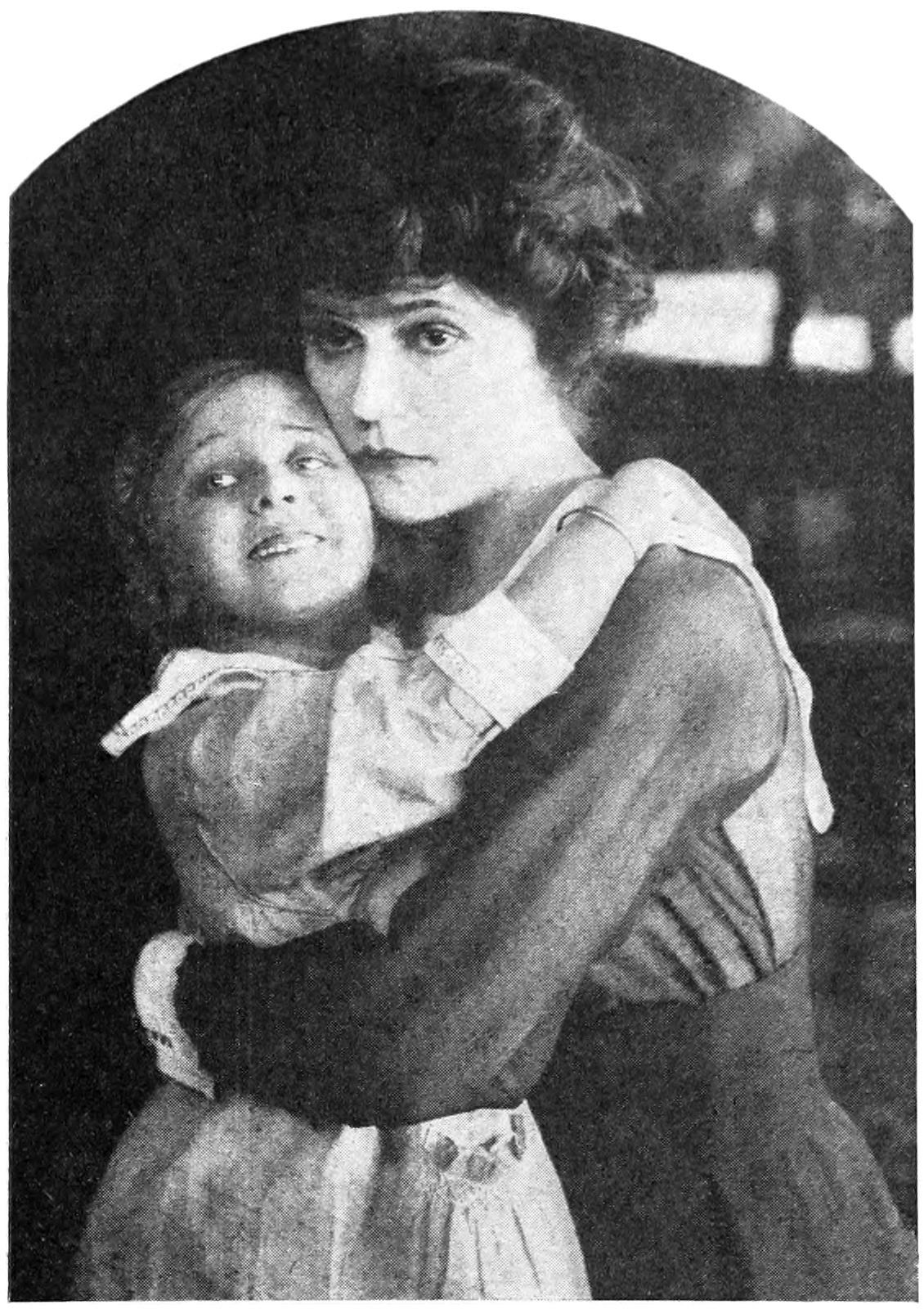
- Madge Evans and Alice Brady in Woman and Wife
- Directed by: Edward José
- Written by: Paul West (scenario)
- Based on: Jane Eyre by Charlotte Brontë
- Cinematography: Benjamin Struckman
- Production company: Select Pictures
- Distributed by: Select Pictures
- Release date: January 1918
- Running time: 5 reels
- Country: United States
- Language: Silent (English intertitles)

Woman and Wife is a 1918 American silent drama film directed by Edward Jose and starring Alice Brady. It is based on the 1847 novel Jane Eyre by Charlotte Brontë. The Select Pictures Corporation produced and distributed the film. The film was also known as The Lifted Cross.

The film survives in an incomplete state at the BFI National Film and Television Archive.

== Plot ==
As described in a film magazine, Jane Eyre (Brady) is sent to an orphan's home by her domineering aunt, and is expelled from that institution after she slaps the superintendent's face for trying to embrace her. She secures a position in the Rochester home as a governess for their only child. The lonesome Edward Rochester, believing his wife dead, proposes to Jane. His wife's brother appears, bringing along his demented sister, who is Edward's wife. He hides her in a room, and while the household is asleep the demented woman escapes and stabs Edward. Upon his recovery, the wedding proceeds, and at its height Edward's demented wife escapes from her room and interrupts the ceremony. Pursued by servants, she throws herself into a pool and drowns.

== Cast ==
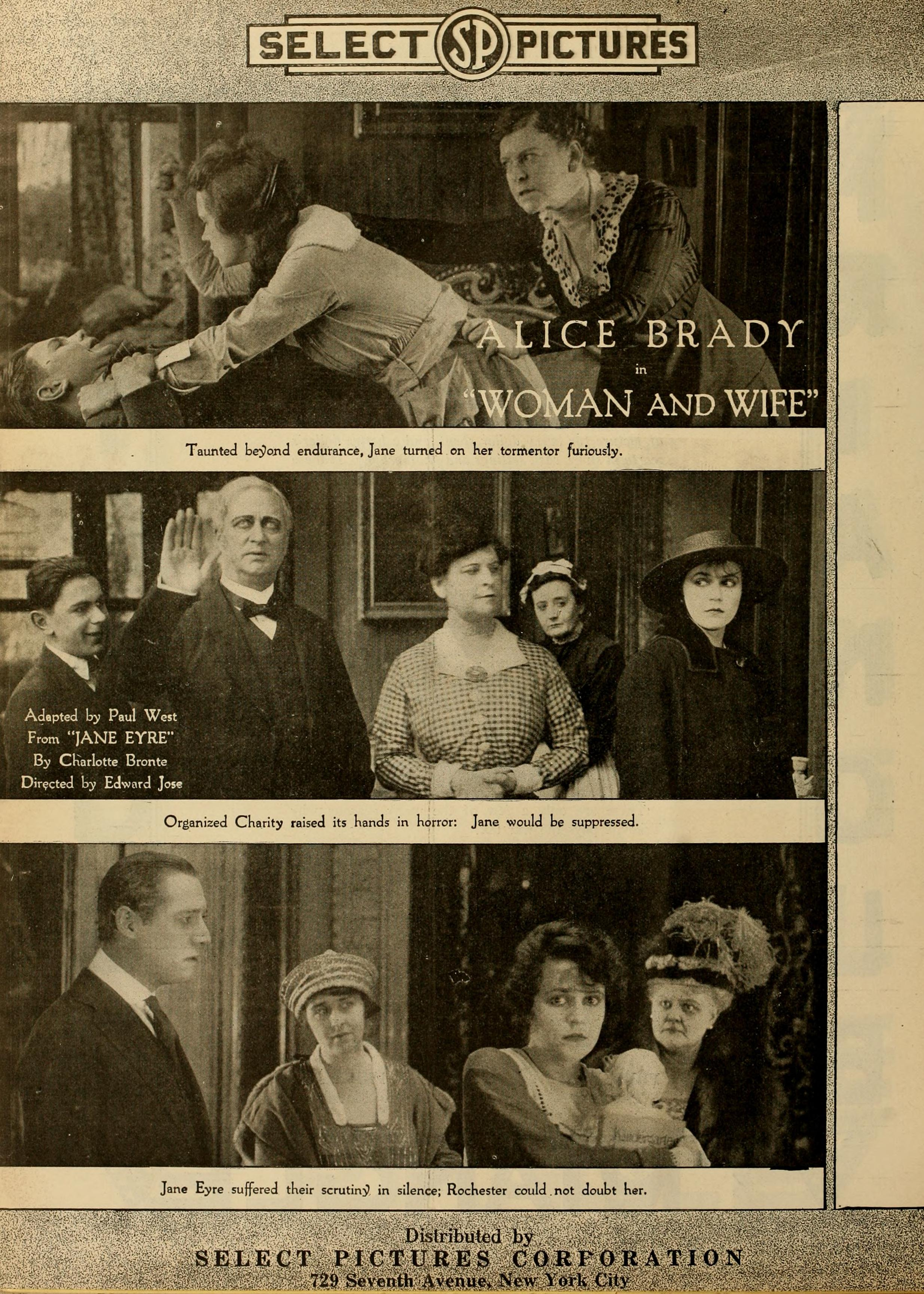
Advertisement for Woman and Wife

- Alice Brady as Jane Eyre
- Elliott Dexter as Edward Rochester
- Helen Greene as Therese
- Helen Lindroth as Grace Poole
- Victor Benoit as Raoul Daquin
- Leonora Morgan as Valerie Rochester
- Madge Evans

== Reception ==
Like many American films of the time, Woman and Wife was subject to cuts by city and state film censorship boards. For example, the Chicago Board of Censors required a cut in Reel 1 of the first scenes of the woman drinking.
