= Bertha Mason =

Fictional character from the novel Jane Eyre

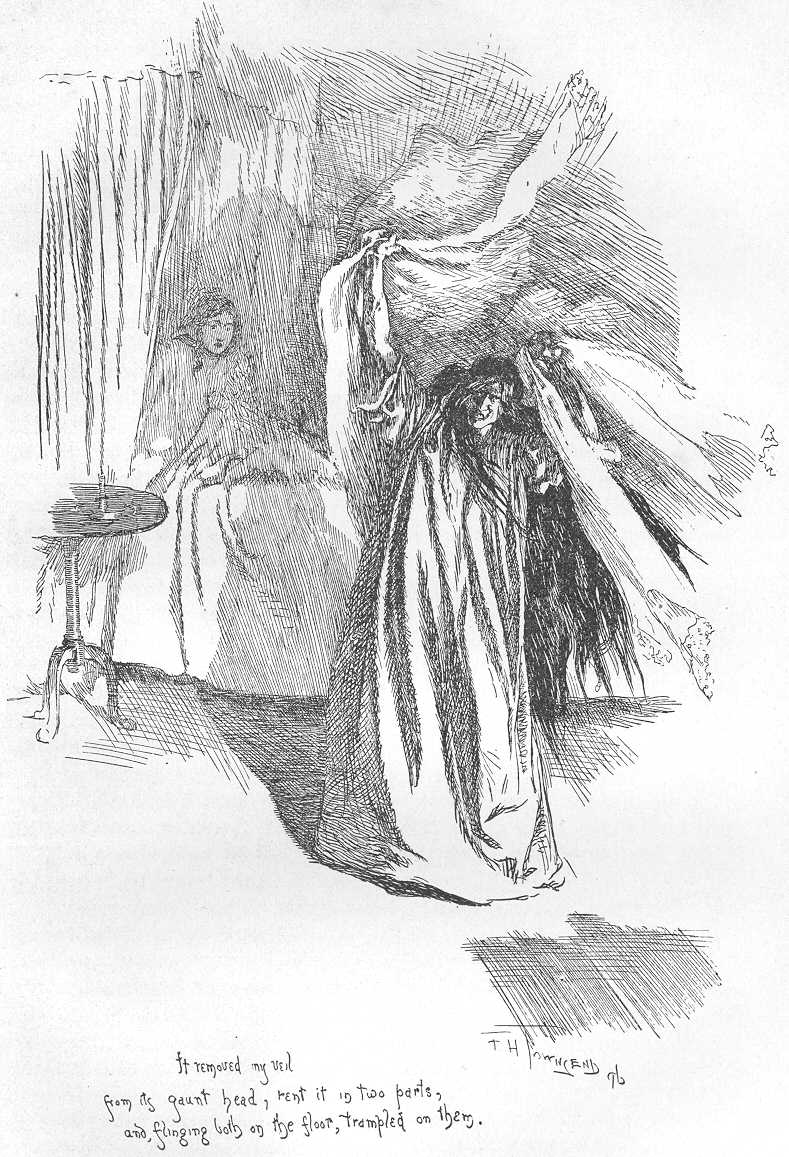
Bertha Mason in the foreground, an illustration by F. H. Townsend for the second edition of Jane Eyre, published in 1847

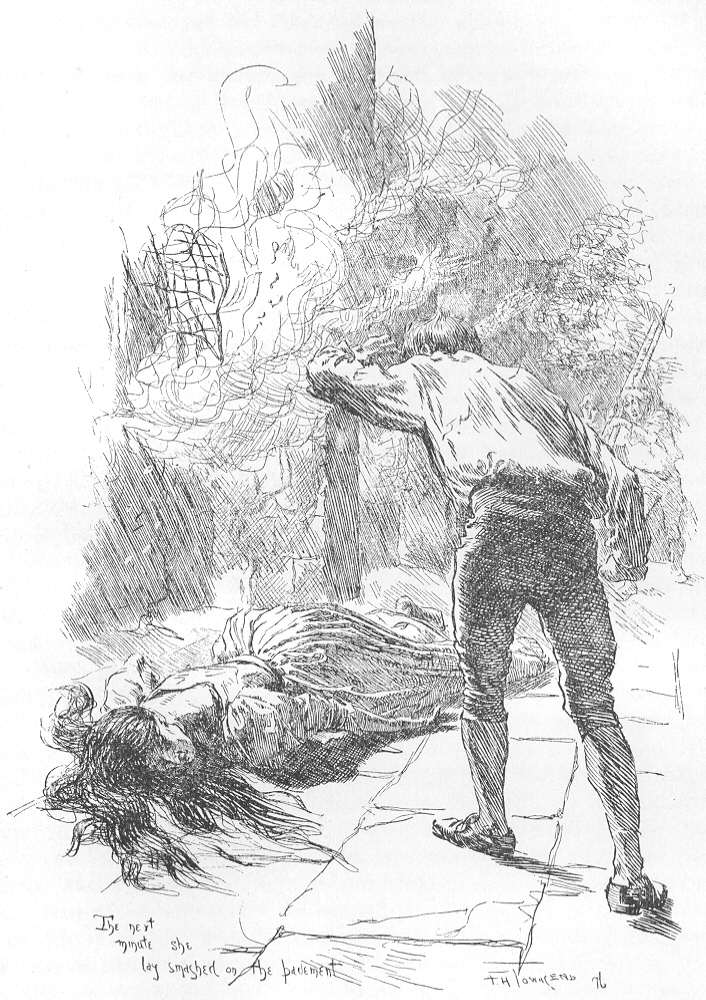
Bertha Mason smashed on the pavement after throwing herself off the roof when Thornfield Hall is on fire

Bertha Antoinetta Rochester (née Mason) is a character in Charlotte Brontë's 1847 novel Jane Eyre. Bertha is described as the violently insane first wife of Edward Rochester, who moved her to Thornfield Hall and locked her in a room on the third floor.

== In Jane Eyre ==
Bertha Mason is the only daughter of a very wealthy family living in Spanish Town, Jamaica. The reader learns of her past not from her perspective but only through descriptions of her by Edward Rochester, her unhappy husband. She is described as being of Creole heritage on her mother's side. According to Rochester, Bertha was famous for her beauty: she was the pride of the town and sought after by many suitors. Upon leaving college, Rochester was persuaded by his father to visit the Mason family and court Bertha. As he tells it, he first meets her at a ball she attended with her father and brother Richard, where he was entranced by her loveliness. Despite never being alone with her (although this was not unusual, as at the time it was considered inappropriate for a young, unmarried woman to be left unchaperoned with a man), and supposedly having had scarcely any interaction or conversation with her, he married her for her wealth and beauty, and with fierce encouragement from his own father and the Mason family. Rochester and Bertha began their lives as husband and wife in Jamaica. In recounting the history of their relationship, Rochester claims,

I thought I loved her. ... Her relatives encouraged me; competitors piqued me; she allured me: a marriage was achieved almost before I knew where I was. Oh, I have no respect for myself when I think of that act! ... I never loved, I never esteemed, I did not even know her.

Rochester explains that he was not warned that violent insanity and intellectual disability ran in the Mason family and that the past three generations succumbed to it. He assumed Bertha's mother to be dead and was never told otherwise, but she was locked away in an asylum. Bertha also had an intellectually disabled younger brother. Rochester's father knew of this but did not bother to tell his son, caring only about the vast fortune the marriage would bring him, and the Mason family clearly wanted Bertha off their hands as quickly as possible. Rochester asserts that Bertha's mental health deteriorated quickly, though it is unclear which form of mental illness she has. Her insane, violent behaviour becomes frightening to behold. Her laughter is described as "demonic", she crawls on all fours, snarling, and behaving in a bestial manner.

Rochester returns with her to England and has her imprisoned in a third-floor room off the gallery of his house for ten years with Grace Poole, a hired nurse who keeps her under control. Rochester travels abroad to forget his horrible marriage. However, Grace drinks sometimes, and Bertha manages to escape, causing havoc in the house: starting a fire in Mr Rochester's bed and biting and stabbing her visiting brother.

Rochester's marriage to Bertha eventually stands in the way of his marrying Jane Eyre, who is unaware of Bertha's existence and whom he truly loves. (He later admits to Jane that he once thought he loved Bertha). As Bertha is insane he cannot divorce her, due to her actions being uncontrollable and thus not legitimate grounds for divorce. Years of violence, insanity, and confinement in an attic destroy Bertha's looks: when she sees Bertha in the middle of the night, Jane describes Bertha as looking "savage", even going so far as to compare her with a "vampire". Bertha destroys Jane's wedding veil (an action that hints that Bertha is at least sane enough to be aware that her husband is planning to enter a bigamous marriage). Despite not loving her, Rochester attempts to save Bertha from a fire she starts in the house when she again escapes. Bertha dies after throwing herself off the roof, leaving her husband free to marry Jane.

Though her race is never mentioned, it is sometimes conjectured that she was of mixed race. Rochester suggests that Bertha's father wanted her to marry him, because he was of "good race", implying that she was not pure white, while he was. There are also references to her "dark" hair, and "discoloured" and "black" face. A number of Victorian writers at the time suggested that madness could result from a racially "impure" lineage, compounded by growing up in a tropical West Indian climate.

== Bertha's imprisonment in Jane Eyre ==
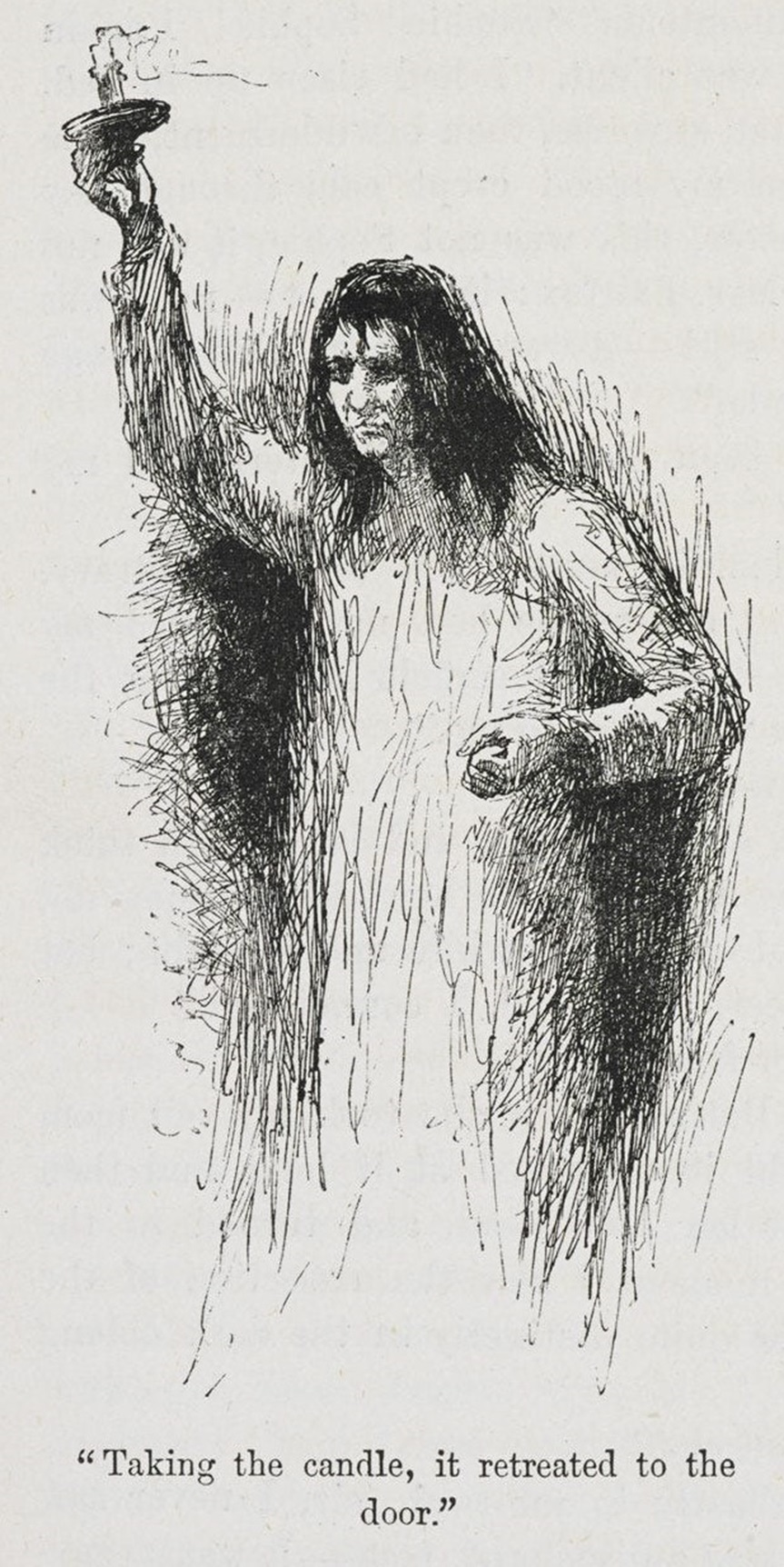
Bertha Mason as depicted by Edmund Henry Garrett (1890)

Bertha never speaks for herself so readers have only Rochester's account of their relationship. His reliability soon comes into question, as, in his confession to Jane, he repeatedly claims Bertha is not his wife: "'I am a fool!' cried Mr. Rochester suddenly. 'I keep telling her [Jane] I am not married, and do not explain to her why. I forget she knows nothing of the character of that woman, or of the circumstances attending my infernal union with her." Obviously, he is married to Bertha, a circumstance he lied about to Jane so that she would agree to marry him. Though he claims to love her, this is an act that would ruin Jane's life should it be discovered. Because of this, his trustworthiness is in doubt, as is his reliability as a narrator. In his confession to Jane, he explains that ten years earlier, he imprisoned Bertha in a room on the third story because she is mad. He later states that he asked his father and brother to keep the marriage secret:

My father and brother had not made my marriage known to their acquaintance; because, in the very first letter I wrote to apprise them of the union—having already begun to experience extreme disgust of its consequences, and, from the family character and constitution, seeing a hideous future opening to me—I added an urgent charge to keep it secret ...

In addition, he tells Jane of his plan to return to England, where he could keep his marriage secret by imprisoning Bertha in Thornfield Hall:

‘Go,’ said Hope, ‘and live again in Europe: there it is not known what a sullied name you bear, nor what a filthy burden is bound to you. You may take the maniac with you to England; confine her with due attendance and precautions at Thornfield: then travel yourself to what clime you will, and form what new tie you like. That woman, who has so abused your long-suffering, so sullied your name, so outraged your honour, so blighted your youth, is not your wife, nor are you her husband. See that she is cared for as her condition demands, and you have done all that God and humanity require of you. Let her identity, her connection with yourself, be buried in oblivion: you are bound to impart them to no living being. Place her in safety and comfort: shelter her degradation with secrecy, and leave her.

The legality of Rochester’s plan seems doubtful, but, earlier in the novel, Bertha's brother Richard Mason did not contest the confinement of his sister. The reason for this is that by mid-nineteenth century English marriage laws, what Rochester did was legal. Called the doctrine of coverture, it allowed husbands total control of their wives. So, within the context of the 1847 novel, Rochester's behavior goes unquestioned, because English law gave husbands the power to confine their wives. Under coverture, when a woman married, her legal identity merged with her husband's; her legal existence was paused under a principle called unity of person. Husbands and wives were a single legal unit under the control of the husband. Further, husbands gained control of their wives' property, including any earnings or inheritances that she received after marriage. As a wife, a woman could not sign contracts or sue in court. Everything she owned belonged to her husband, including her clothes. Even her children were her husband's, and should she divorce, she would be left with only the clothes on her back. Further, coverture allowed husbands to confine and even physically abuse their wives. Rochester uses the doctrine of coverture to not just confine Bertha, but make her disappear, while he escapes to continental Europe to live in luxury on the money she brought to the marriage. Bertha's marriage to Rochester is an extreme example of what could happen to a wife under coverture – her complete erasure. In this light, Bertha's madness might take on another dimension, as does the way she expresses herself through her actions. It is unclear how mad Bertha was when Rochester confined her, because he says in his confession to Jane:

I had some trouble in finding an attendant for her, as it was necessary to select one on whose fidelity dependence could be placed; for her ravings would inevitably betray my secret: besides, she had lucid intervals of days—sometimes weeks—which she filled up with abuse of me.

Rochester explains that Bertha "had lucid intervals of days – sometimes weeks", which means he continued to confine her even when she had periods of recovery. That Bertha would be angry with him makes sense; his insistence that he was the one who was abused is ironic. Viewing the events of their relationship from Bertha's perspective reveals her suffering: her husband had her declared insane, took her from her homeland and her family, and imprisoned her in an attic room in a foreign country. Confined for ten years, she has had contact with only Rochester, Grace Poole, the doctor and her brother. Such treatment would be deleterious to the mental health of even a stable person. By the time Jane becomes a governess at Thornfield Hall, Bertha has lost her verbal abilities, but her actions demonstrate how she feels about Rochester. However, it is more difficult to parse Bertha's actions toward Jane. For example, since veil has a double meaning, when Bertha tears Jane's bridal veil, it is perhaps a warning to Jane that her relationship with Rochester is not what it seems, and that by marrying him Jane will be ruined.

== Antoinette Cosway in Wide Sargasso Sea ==
The 1966 parallel novel Wide Sargasso Sea by Jean Rhys serves as a prequel to Brontë's novel. It is the story of Bertha (there called Antoinette Cosway) from the time of her youth in the Caribbean to her unhappy marriage and relocation to England. Rhys's novel re-imagines Brontë's devilish madwoman in the attic. Bertha serves as Jane's "double", juxtaposing the feminist character to a character constrained by domesticity.

In Wide Sargasso Sea, "Bertha Mason" is portrayed as being a false name for Antoinette Cosway. Rhys's novel purports to tell Antoinette's side of the story, as well as Rochester's, and to account for how she ended up alone and raving in the attic of Thornfield Hall. According to the book, Antoinette's insanity and drunkenness are the result of Rochester's misguided belief that madness is in her blood and that she was part of the scheme to have him married blindly.

Antoinette's family were impoverished by the abolition of slavery in Jamaica. After her widowed, mentally frail, Martiniquais mother remarries the wealthy Englishman, Mr. Mason, vengeful former slaves burn down the family estate, angry that their oppressors' fortunes are restored. The fire kills Pierre, Antoinette's younger brother, and drives her mother's mental state over the brink. Mr. Mason exiles his wife, and forgets about her. Mason then arranges for Antoinette to marry Rochester, and the marriage is doomed from the start.

The characters of Jane Eyre and Antoinette are portrayed as being very similar: independent, vivacious, imaginative young women with troubled childhoods, educated in religious establishments and looked down on by the upper classes—and, of course, they both marry Mr Rochester. However, Antoinette is more rebellious than Jane and less mentally stable. She displays a deep vein of morbidity verging on a death-wish and, in contrast with Jane's overt Christianity, holds a cynical viewpoint of both God and religion in general.
