= 55th Tony Awards =

2001 US theatrical awards ceremony

- Date: June 3, 2001
- Location: Radio City Music Hall, New York City, New York
- Hosted by: Matthew Broderick and Nathan Lane

Highlights
- Most wins: The Producers (12)
- Most nominations: The Producers (15)
- Website: tonyawards.com

Television/radio coverage
- Network: CBS
- Viewership: 8.9 million
- Produced by: Ricky Kirshner; Gary Smith
- Directed by: Glenn Weiss

The 55th Annual Tony Awards was held at Radio City Music Hall on June 3, 2001 and broadcast by CBS. "The First Ten" awards ceremony, produced in association with Thirteen/WNET New York was telecast on PBS television . The event was co-hosted by Nathan Lane and Matthew Broderick. The Producers, starring Lane and Broderick, won 12 awards (every award it was eligible to win), breaking the 37-year-old record set by Hello, Dolly! to become the most awarded show in Tony Awards history. Mel Brooks's win made him the eighth person to become an EGOT.

== Eligibility ==
Shows that opened on Broadway during the 2000–01 season before May 3, 2001 are eligible.

Original plays

- The Dinner Party
- The Gathering
- George Gershwin Alone
- The Invention of Love
- Judgment at Nuremberg
- King Hedley II
- Proof
- Stones in His Pockets
- The Tale of the Allergist's Wife

Original musicals

- The Adventures of Tom Sawyer
- Blast!
- A Class Act
- The Full Monty
- Jane Eyre
- The Producers
- Seussical

Play revivals

- The Best Man
- Betrayal
- Design for Living
- Macbeth
- The Man Who Came to Dinner
- One Flew Over the Cuckoo's Nest
- The Search for Signs of Intelligent Life in the Universe

Musical revivals

- Bells Are Ringing
- Follies
- 42nd Street
- The Rocky Horror Show

== The ceremony ==
Presenters: Joan Allen, Dick Cavett, Kristin Chenoweth, Glenn Close, Dame Edna, Edie Falco, Kathleen Freeman, Gina Gershon, Heather Headley, Cherry Jones, Jane Krakowski, Marc Kudisch, Eric McCormack, Audra McDonald, Reba McEntire, Donna McKechnie, Brian Stokes Mitchell, Gwyneth Paltrow, Sarah Jessica Parker, Bernadette Peters, Natasha Richardson, Doris Roberts, Gary Sinise, Lily Tomlin, Henry Winkler, and three "Broadway Babies" (Meredith Patterson, Bryn Bowling, and Carol Bentley).

The musicals that performed were:

- A Class Act ("Follow Your Star"/"Better"/"Self Portrait"—Nancy Anderson, Jeff Blumenkrantz, Donna Bullock, Randy Graff, David Hibbard, Lonny Price, Patrick Quinn, Sara Ramirez);
- Bells Are Ringing ("I'm Going Back" -- Faith Prince);
- 42nd Street ("42nd Street"—David Elder, Kate Levering and company);
- Follies ("I'm Still Here" -- Polly Bergen with Louis Zorich, Jessica Leigh Brown, Colleen Dunn, Amy Heggins, and Wendy Waring);
- The Full Monty ("Let It Go"—John Ellison Conlee, Jason Danieley, André De Shields, Kathleen Freeman, Romain Fruge, Marcus Neville, Patrick Wilson, Thomas Fiss, and company);
- Jane Eyre ("Sirens" -- Marla Schaffel and James Barbour);
- The Producers, the new Mel Brooks Musical ("Along Came Bialy" -- Roger Bart, Gary Beach, Matthew Broderick, Cady Huffman, Nathan Lane, Brad Oscar, and company); and
- The Rocky Horror Show ("Time Warp" -- Dick Cavett, Lea Delaria, Jerrod Emick, Kristen Lee Kelly, Alice Ripley, Daphne Rubin-Vega, Tom Hewitt, Raul Esparza, Sebastian LaCause, and company).

Plays were also presented:

- The Invention of Love, introduced by playwright Tom Stoppard. Montage with voice-over by Richard Easton.
- King Hedley II, introduced by playwright August Wilson. Excerpt performed by Viola Davis and Brian Stokes Mitchell.
- One Flew Over the Cuckoo's Nest, introduced by Joan Allen. Excerpt performed by Gary Sinise, Amy Morton, Tim Sampson, Bruce McCarty, Jeanine Morick, and Afram Bill Williams.
- Proof, introduced by playwright David Auburn. Scene with Mary-Louise Parker and Ben Shenkman.
- The Tale of the Allergist's Wife, introduced by playwright Charles Busch. Scene with Linda Lavin, Tony Roberts, and Michele Lee.

== Winners and nominees ==
Winners are in bold

Source: BroadwayWorld

Best Play	Best Musical
**Proof – David Auburn**; The Invention of Love – Tom Stoppard; King Hedley II – August Wilson; The Tale of the Allergist's Wife – Charles Busch	**The Producers**; A Class Act; The Full Monty; Jane Eyre
Best Revival of a Play	Best Revival of a Musical
**One Flew Over the Cuckoo's Nest**; Betrayal; The Best Man; The Search for Signs of Intelligent Life in the Universe	**42nd Street**; Bells Are Ringing; Follies; The Rocky Horror Show
Best Performance by a Leading Actor in a Play	Best Performance by a Leading Actress in a Play
**Richard Easton – The Invention of Love as A. E. Housman**; Seán Campion – Stones in His Pockets as Jake Quinn; Conleth Hill – Stones in His Pockets as Charlie Conlon; Brian Stokes Mitchell – King Hedley II as King; Gary Sinise – One Flew Over the Cuckoo's Nest as Randle P. McMurphy	**Mary-Louise Parker – Proof as Catherine**; Juliette Binoche – Betrayal as Emma; Linda Lavin – The Tale of the Allergist's Wife as Marjorie Taub; Jean Smart – The Man Who Came to Dinner as Lorraine Sheldon; Leslie Uggams – King Hedley II as Ruby
Best Performance by a Leading Actor in a Musical	Best Performance by a Leading Actress in a Musical
**Nathan Lane – The Producers as Max Bialystock**; Matthew Broderick – The Producers as Leo Bloom; Kevin Chamberlin – Seussical as Horton the Elephant; Tom Hewitt – The Rocky Horror Show as Frank N Furter; Patrick Wilson – The Full Monty as Jerry Lukowski	**Christine Ebersole – 42nd Street as Dorothy Brock**; Blythe Danner – Follies as Phyllis Rogers Stone; Randy Graff – A Class Act as Sophie; Faith Prince – Bells Are Ringing as Ella Peterson; Marla Schaffel – Jane Eyre as Jane Eyre
Best Performance by a Featured Actor in a Play	Best Performance by a Featured Actress in a Play
**Robert Sean Leonard – The Invention of Love as A. E. Housman**; Larry Bryggman – Proof as Robert; Ben Shenkman – Proof as Hal; Charles Brown – King Hedley II as Elmore; Michael Hayden – Judgment at Nuremberg as Oscar Rolfe	**Viola Davis – King Hedley II as Tonya**; Johanna Day – Proof as Claire; Penny Fuller – The Dinner Party as Gabrielle Buonocelli; Michele Lee – The Tale of the Allergist's Wife as Lee; Marthe Keller – Judgment at Nuremberg as Mme. Bertholt
Best Performance by a Featured Actor in a Musical	Best Performance by a Featured Actress in a Musical
**Gary Beach – The Producers as Roger DeBris**; Roger Bart – The Producers as Carmen Ghia; Brad Oscar – The Producers as Franz Liebkind; John Ellison Conlee – The Full Monty as Dave Bukatinsky; André DeShields – The Full Monty as Noah "Horse" T. Simmons	**Cady Huffman – The Producers as Ulla**; Kate Levering – 42nd Street as Peggy Sawyer; Mary Testa – 42nd Street as Maggie Jones; Polly Bergen – Follies as Carlotta Campion; Kathleen Freeman – The Full Monty as Jeanette Burmeister
Best Book of a Musical	Best Original Score (Music and/or Lyrics) Written for the Theatre
**Mel Brooks and Thomas Meehan – The Producers**; Linda Kline and Lonny Price – A Class Act; Terrence McNally – The Full Monty; John Caird – Jane Eyre	**The Producers – Mel Brooks (music and lyrics)**; A Class Act – Edward Kleban (music and lyrics); The Full Monty – David Yazbek (music and lyrics); Jane Eyre – Paul Gordon (music and lyrics)
Best Scenic Design	Best Costume Design
**Robin Wagner – The Producers**; Bob Crowley – The Invention of Love; Heidi Ettinger – The Adventures of Tom Sawyer; Douglas W. Schmidt – 42nd Street	**William Ivey Long – The Producers**; Theoni V. Aldredge – Follies; Roger Kirk – 42nd Street; David C. Woolard – The Rocky Horror Show
Best Lighting Design	Best Orchestrations
**Peter Kaczorowski – The Producers**; Jules Fisher and Peggy Eisenhauer – Jane Eyre; Paul Gallo – 42nd Street; Kenneth Posner – The Adventures of Tom Sawyer	**Doug Besterman – The Producers**; Larry Hochman – A Class Act; Jonathan Tunick – Follies; Harold Wheeler – The Full Monty
Best Direction of a Play	Best Direction of a Musical
**Daniel Sullivan – Proof**; Marion McClinton – King Hedley II; Ian McElhinney – Stones in His Pockets; Jack O'Brien – The Invention of Love	**Susan Stroman – The Producers**; Christopher Ashley – The Rocky Horror Show; Mark Bramble – 42nd Street; Jack O'Brien – The Full Monty
Best Choreography
**Susan Stroman – The Producers**; Jerry Mitchell – The Full Monty; Jim Moore, George Pinney and Jonathan Vanderkolff – Blast!; Randy Skinner – 42nd Street

== Special awards ==
Regional Theatre Award

- Victory Gardens Theater, Chicago, Illinois

Special Theatrical Event

- Blast!

Special Lifetime Achievement Tony Award

- Paul Gemignani

Tony Honors for Excellence in the Theatre

- Betty Corwin and the Theatre on Film and Tape Archive of the New York Public Library for the Performing Arts
- New Dramatists
- Theatre World

=== Multiple nominations and awards ===
These productions had multiple nominations:

- 15 nominations: The Producers
- 10 nominations: The Full Monty
- 9 nominations: 42nd Street
- 6 nominations: King Hedley II and Proof
- 5 nominations: A Class Act, Follies, The Invention of Love and Jane Eyre
- 4 nominations: The Rocky Horror Show
- 3 nominations: Stones in His Pockets and The Tale of the Allergist's Wife
- 2 nominations: The Adventures of Tom Sawyer, Bells Are Ringing, Betrayal, Blast!, Judgment at Nuremberg and One Flew Over the Cuckoo's Nest

The following productions received multiple awards.

- 12 wins: The Producers
- 3 wins: Proof
- 2 wins: 42nd Street and The Invention of Love

== See also ==
- Drama Desk Awards
- 2001 Laurence Olivier Awards – equivalent awards for West End theatre productions
- Obie Award
- New York Drama Critics' Circle
- Theatre World Award
- Lucille Lortel Awards
