= Anthony Crivello =

American actor

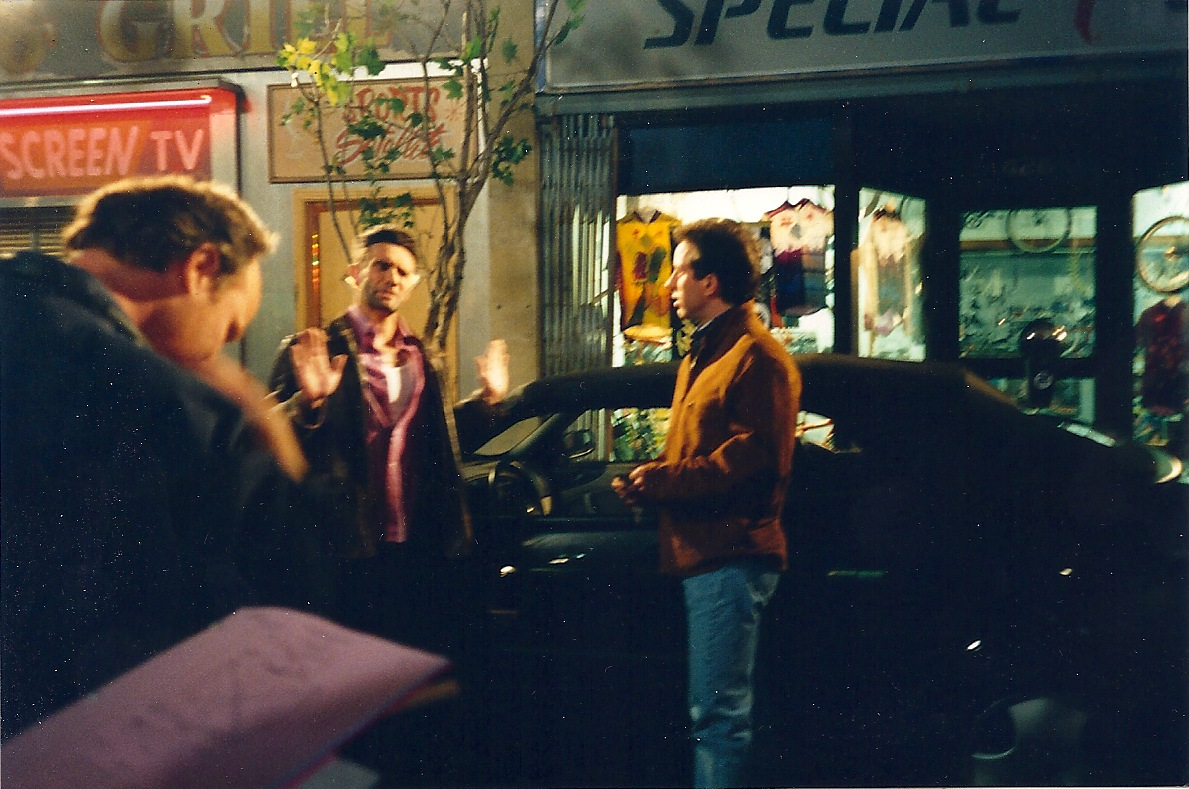
- Crivello (center) with Jerry Seinfeld, filming the Seinfeld episode "The Maid"
- Born: August 2, 1955 (age 71); Milwaukee, Wisconsin, U.S.
- Occupations: Actor, singer
- Known for: The Phantom of the Opera; Kiss of the Spider Woman; Evita; Les Misérables
- Spouse: Dori Rosenthal (m. 2005)
- Children: 2

Anthony Crivello (born August 2, 1955) is an American actor, known for his performances on both stage and screen. He appeared in the original cast of several Broadway shows, including playing Grantaire and Inspector Javert in Les Misérables, Valentin in Kiss of the Spider Woman, Eddie Fuseli in Golden Boy, Dante Keyes in Marie Christine, and the Killer in The News. He also originated the title role in The Phantom of the Opera: The Las Vegas Spectacular and stayed with the cast through its closing six years later. He starred as Che in the original Broadway production of Andrew Lloyd-Webber Tim Rice’s Evita directed by Hal Prince. In 1993, he won the Tony Award for Best Featured Actor in a Musical for his performance as Valentin in Kiss of the Spider Woman also directed by Hal Prince.

== Early life ==
Crivello was born in Milwaukee, Wisconsin, the son of Josephine (née Mussomeli) and Vincent J. Crivello. He graduated from Saint Rita's Grade School on Milwaukee's East Side, and then All-Boys Catholic Saint Thomas More High School in 1973. In high school he participated in varsity football, varsity soccer and wrestling. During that same time, early in his career, he appeared in 12 high school and community theatre productions, including three at Sunset Playhouse, directed by Alan Furlan and Mary H. Strong. He married actress/commercial talent agent Dori Rosenthal on May 14, 2005, and they have two children together. He was inducted into the Saint Thomas More Alumni Hall of Fame in 1995.

== Career ==
He is a lifetime member of the Actors Studio (NYC/LA). His former acting teachers include: Tony Greco, Estelle Parsons, Harvey Keitel, Barbara Bain, Martin Landau as well as Michael Howard, Terry Schreiber and Mary H. Strong. His vocal coach for over thirty years is Anne Perillo/DePaul University. He studied comic improv with Del Close at The Second City in Chicago.

Crivello is an Honored Member of Marquette University's Century of Scholarship. He was the recipient of Marquette University's College of Speech & Communications 2003 Communicator of the Year Award. He is listed in Who's Who in America, and is a member of the Saint Thomas More High School Alumni Hall of Fame. He was inducted into the Marquette University Hall of Fame with his image displayed in Johnston Hall in the Diederich College of Communication on the campus of Marquette University.

In 2008, Crivello was the host of his own radio show on FOX SPORTS/ 920 AM Las Vegas called Tony Crivello and The Sicilians. Mr. Crivello has also moonlighted as a ring announcer & commentator for ESPN2's Kickboxing Championships, and owns stock with the NFL's Green Bay Packers.

=== Theater ===
Crivello got his Equity Card at age 19, playing Conrad Birdie in a production of Bye Bye Birdie by Milwaukee's Melody Top Theatre. He broke into the Chicago theater scene in 1979, originating the role of "Felix 'The Filth Fiend' Linder" in the original cast of John R. Powers' Do Black Patent Leather Shoes Really Reflect Up? at Chicago's Forum Theatre. Shortly thereafter, in 1980, he was cast in a national touring company of Evita by director Harold Prince, where he played "Che". Prince eventually cast Crivello replacing Mandy Patinkin in the original Broadway production of Evita in 1981; it was Crivello's Broadway debut .

After completing his “Evita” run, he appeared off-Broadway in Wendy Kesselman's The Juniper Tree as well as The Lincoln Center production of Shakespeare's Measure For Measure directed by Mark Lamos.

He appeared in the musical The News starring as “The Killer”, first in Jupiter, Florida receiving a Carbonelle Award for “Outstanding Performance by a Lead Actor.” He performed that same role at Westport Country Playhouse, and then on Broadway at the Helen Hayes Theatre. He was an original Broadway cast member of Alain Boublil and Claude-Michel Schonberg's Les Misérables for directors Trevor Nunn and John Caird and producer Cameron Mackintosh, first as Grantaire, and ten months later taking over the leading role of Javert. (He would later play Grantaire once again in a special tenth-anniversary concert at the Royal Albert Hall, London in “The Dream Cast/10th Anniversary Production of Les Miserables in Concert.)

He starred on Broadway as "Valentin" in the Kander and Ebb Terrence McNally musical Kiss of the Spider Woman in 1993 directed by the incomparable Harold Prince. For his performance, he was nominated for a Dora Mavor Moore Award while in try-outs in Toronto. He then originated the same role in London's West End Production of “Kiss” prior to its Broadway engagement. For his portrayal, Crivello won Broadway's 1993 Tony Award as "Best Featured Actor in a Musical." In 1999, he starred in Michael John LaChiusa's Marie Christine directed by Graciela Daniele at The Lincoln Center's Vivian Beaumont Theatre on Broadway opposite Audra McDonald and Mary Testa. Two years later, he received a Los Angeles Ovation Award nomination, a Garland Award nomination, a Robby Award nomination, and a Los Angeles Drama Critics Award nomination for "Outstanding Performance by a Lead Actor in a Musical" for Do I Hear a Waltz? at the Pasadena Playhouse directed by David Lee.

Crivello starred in the Goodman Theater of Chicago production of The House Of Martin Guerre for which he received Chicago's Joseph Jefferson Award for his portrayal of Martin Guerre directed by David Petrarca. In August 2005, he appeared at the La Jolla Playhouse in San Diego, California in a workshop production of Zhivago, a musicalisation of the Boris Pasternak novel by Marsha Norman and Lucy Simon, and directed by Des McAnuff. He starred in the Steve Martin adaptation of The Underpants at the Geffen Playhouse, directed by John Rando, as well as David Ives' adaptation of A Flea in Her Ear for the Chicago Shakespeare Theatre directed by Gary Griffin for which he received his second Joseph Jefferson Award nomination. He starred in the John Caird and Paul Gordon musical Jane Eyre, first in 1994 while in development in Wichita, KS and then in the 1996 Toronto staging of “Jane Eyre.” Mr. Crivello received a second Dora Mavor Moore nomination in Canada for his portrayal of Edward Fairfax Rochester with that production.

In 2006, he was cast by director Hal Prince as one of two actors rotating in the title role in the Las Vegas production of The Phantom of the Opera. Subsequently, he was cast as “The Phantom", and by September 2012, he appeared in over 2,400 performances.

He appeared in the Lincoln Center 75th Anniversary revival of Clifford Odets' Golden Boy at the Belasco Theatre in New York City, produced by Lincoln Center Theatre in 2012–2013, acting alongside Tony Shalhoub, Seth Numrich, and Yvonne Strahovski, Michael Aronov and directed by Bartlett Sher. In 2014, he appeared in the Kevin Murphy / Laurence O'Keefe Heathers Off-Broadway in New York City at New World Stages, and directed by Andy Fickman.

In 2015 and 2016, Crivello starred in producer Hershey Felder's production of Louis and Keely Live at the Sahara directed by Taylor Hackford, and written by Hackford, Vanessa Claire Stewart and Jake Broder. The musical was performed at the Royal George Theatre in Chicago, as well as the Geffen Playhouse in Los Angeles. Stewart played the role of Keely Smith to Crivello's 'Las Vegas Lounge Legend' Louis Prima and Crivello received this third Joseph Jefferson Award nomination for his work.

In 2017, Crivello portrayed the Marquette University Naismith Basketball Hall Of Fame 1977 NCAA basketball championship coach / NBC broadcaster Al McGuire in the Milwaukee Repertory Theatre one man play McGuire, written by HOF broadcaster Dick Enberg. Crivello received critical praise for his work in the show and won the 2017 Wisconsin Footlights Award for Outstanding Performance by a Leading Actor in a Play. An eight-minute presentation of McGuire was presented at the 2017 Wisconsin Sports Awards on May 20, 2017, at the University of Wisconsin Field House. Crivello reprised his award-winning performance in McGuire in a relaunched new touring production in 2022 at Milwaukee's Next Act Theatre, produced by Bob Rech and Rech Entertainment, and directed by Edward Morgan.

In 2019, Crivello portrayed "The Old Man" Santiago in Ernest Hemingway's The Old Man and the Sea, adapted for the stage by A. E. Hotchner and Tim Hotchner, presented at the Pittsburgh Playhouse on the campus of Point Park University, directed by Ronald Allan-Lindblom and produced by RWS Entertainment Group of New York City/Long Island City, receiving critical praise for his work.

In July 2019, Crivello made his Hollywood Bowl debut as "The Mysterious Man" in the star-studded production of Into the Woods by Stephen Sondheim directed by Robert Longbottom.

He has also performed comic improv Off-Broadway and is a resident company alumni of Chicago City Limits in New York City.

As a producer, he has co-produced the plays Hear What's In The Heart and Mcguire at the Next Act Theatre, as well as Please Leave with Rob Sedgwick at The Theatre Center in New York City. He produced readings of his screenplays and plays Scouting Patti Style, The Great Stupid, Allegoria, 2B Caesar, and The Chicken Brothers and screenplays by Charles D. Zicari. He served as executive producer on Bobby Sheehan's documentary films Mr. Prince and The Talent Collector.

=== Television and film ===
Crivello is slated to shoot a guest star spot on the acclaimed HBO MAX series The Pitt in 2026.

Crivello started his feature film work co-starring in two films: Crocodile Dundee II opposite Paul Hogan in 1988, and Shakedown opposite Sam Elliot. He then starred in director Janet Greek's MGM film Spellbinder with Kelly Preston and Tim Daly. He was featured in director James Ivory's comedy Slaves of New York in 1989 opposite Bernadette Peters.

Crivello co-starred in the Jim Abrahams film comedy Mafia! (1998), Texas Rangers (2001), Material Girls (2006), Independence Day, and Trade (2007). In 1992, Crivello starred in the short film The Bet for director Ted Demme. Crivello has also starred in the independent short films Petal Of A Rose, Henry Toy for director Anthony Engelken in 2014, and portrayed "Boonie" in director Taryn Kosviner's NYShorts Festival's The Mark in 2016.

In 2016, he starred in the Hallmark Television movie Emma's Chance. Director John Gray had him starring in his television movie The Lost Capone. In 1995 he starred in the Roger Corman produced Dillinger and Capone, opposite Martin Sheen and Monster Mash: The Movie. He also appeared in Dominic Dunne's 919 Fifth Avenue. In 1996 he followed with Alien Avengers. In 2000, he was featured in the Wonderful World Of Disney made-for-television musical Geppetto. In 1988, Crivello guest starred as Miguel Carrera in Miami Vice directed by Don Johnson.

Crivello has guest starred on the science fiction television series Star Trek: Voyager, Team Knight Rider, and Babylon 5. He also co-starred in director Ron Krauss's Sci-Fi Channel/SONY film Alien Hunter opposite James Spader. He has appeared in numerous sitcoms, including Seinfeld, Frasier, In-Laws and Normal, Ohio, and TV police procedurals, including CSI: New York and Law & Order.

In 2013, he appeared in the Liberace biopic Behind the Candelabra, directed by Steven Soderbergh. Crivello appeared as British film director David Lean in director/producer Ryan Murphy's 2017 FOX miniseries Feud opposite Jessica Lange.

In 2021, he appeared in Black Easter.

In 2022, Crivello completed principal photography, starring as "Joe" in the independent feature film Children of God. In 2023, he recurred as a comedic officious butler “Sebastian” at “Snickering Mansion” in Disney's comedic anthology Pretty Freekin Scary. Additionally in 2024, he starred as Police Chief D. W. Johnson in the independent film The Omro Heist and also served as executive producer. And in 2025, he is set to be heard as "Franco Bertinelli” in the animated film Batman: Knightfall Part One for Warner Brothers Animation. In 2026, he starred in director Corbin Pitt's short film drama White Knuckle Day.

WRITER for Film, Television, Theater and Music- SCREENPLAYS: Carny Trash Pastime (with Vincent Jerman-Jerosa) Michael Corleone Says Hello Frankly OCD Frank (with Anthony Drazan) Scouting Patti Style (with John Nelson) Accidental Johnny (with Peer Bazarini and Ronald Bazarini) The Great Stupid (with Peer Bazarini and Ronald Bazarini) Innocent Violent (with Ronald Bazarini) Pinocchina The Dark Dells (with Charlotte J. Crivello) The Last Lady (with Charles Zicari) Hustle-Bustle A-Ram-A - the short film Pretzels (with Vincent Jerman-Jerosa)

- 14 episodes of a Television anthology series Between Hell and Hunts Point (with Vincent Jerman-Jerosa) - 4 episodes of a TV SITCOM The Chicken Brothers - A treatment/pitch for the TV SERIES An Evening with Frankie Bal - Developing an Interview TV SERIES for television Wisdom Of The Ages - Wrote and directed for Mandalay Films a TV SERIES PITCH entitled Everyday Heroes - Co-wrote the MUSICAL/OPERA book and lyrics entitled 2B Caesar (with Ronald Bazarini and Dale Gutzman) - Co-wrote the MUSICAL book and lyrics for Allegoria - An Irreverent Fairy Tale Musical (with Dale Gutzman) - Wrote additional dialogue for the ONE-MAN STAGE PLAY Hear What’s In The Heart (with Steve Scionti and James Shanta) - Collaborated with Hall Of Fame broadcaster Dick Enberg on his ONE-MAN STAGE PLAY entitled Mcguire (Mr. Crivello portrayed the title character... basketball legend and broadcaster Al Mcguire.) - Currently writing a ONE-MAN STAGE PLAY The King Of Sicily ...and writing a treatment of that play for the screen. - Written over 25 SONGS, including Love is Worth It, If Together We've Cried for the HBO film Midnight Blue (co-written with composer Eric Allaman) -Currently collaborating/writing two books about acting with Professor/Director and 4 time New England Emmy Award winner Edward Wierzbicki.

He starred in the ABC Daytime series One Life to Live as mobster Johnny Dee Hesser from 1990 to 1991. He has also appeared on the daytime series The Bold and The Beautiful and The Guiding Light.

== Stage credits ==
Year(s)	Title	Role	Notes
1977	Bye Bye Birdie	Conrad Birdie	Regional
1979–1980	Do Black Patent Leather Shoes Really Reflect Up?	Felix Lindor	Regional
1980	Evita	Person of Argentina u/s Che	US Tour
1980–1981	Evita	Che	US Tour
1981–1983	Evita	Che	Broadway
1985	The News	The Killer	Broadway
1987	Les Misérables	Grantaire / Bamatabois / Chain Gang u/s Inspector Javert	Broadway
1987–1988	Les Misérables	Inspector Javert	Broadway
1989	Measure for Measure	Father Thomas / Barnardine	Broadway
1992	Kiss of the Spider Woman	Valentin	Canada
1992–1993	Kiss of the Spider Woman	Valentin	West End
1993–1995	Kiss of the Spider Woman	Valentin	Broadway
1995	Camila	Father Ladislao Gutierrez	NYC
1995	Les Misérables: The Dream Cast in Concert	Grantaire	Royal Albert Hall
1996	The House of Martin Guerre	Arnaud	Regional
1996	Jane Eyre	Edward Fairfax Rochester	Canada
1999-2000	Marie Christine	Dante Keyes	Broadway
2000	Expecting Isabel	Nick	Regional
2001	Do I Hear a Waltz?	Renato Di Rossi	Regional
2003	Romantique	Eugene Delacroix	Regional
2003	Assassins	Giuseppe Zangara	Concert
2004	Kismet	The Caliph	Regional
2004	The Underpants	Frank Versati	Regional
2005	Doctor Zhivago	Victor Komarovsky	Workshop
2006–2012	The Phantom of the Opera	The Phantom of the Opera	Las Vegas Spectacular
2012–2013	Golden Boy	Eddie Fuseli	Lincoln Center
2014	Heathers: The Musical	Bill Sweeney / Big Bud Dean / Coach Ripper	Off-Broadway
2015	Louis and Keely Live at the Sahara	Louis Prima	Regional
2016	Louis and Keely Live at the Sahara	Louis Prima	Geffen Playhouse
2016	Evita	Juan Perón	Regional
2017	McGuire	Al McGuire	Regional
2019	The Old Man and the Sea	The Old Man	Regional
2019	Into the Woods	The Mysterious Man	Hollywood Bowl
2022	McGuire	Al McGuire	Regional

== Discography ==
- Phantom: The Las Vegas Spectacular (The Phantom Of The Opera)
- Kiss of the Spider Woman (Original Broadway Cast)
- Marie Christine (Original Broadway Cast)
- Jane Eyre (Toronto, Canada – Original Cast)
- Les Misérables (Original Broadway Cast)
- Les Misérables – 10th Anniversary 'The Dream Cast' in Concert-live from Royal Albert Hall, London
- Do I Hear a Waltz? (Pasadena Playhouse)
- Heathers: The Musical (Original Off-Broadway Cast)
- Cabaret Noel: A Broadway Cares Christmas
- Living Water: Wasser Fur Die Welt (Germany)
- Andreas Vollenweider's Dancing With The Lion (Guest Artist)
- Lucid Structure: Measures (vocals on "Village of Sand")
- The Prince of Egypt – Playing with the Big Boys Demo (with Stephen Schwartz) 1998
- Cry To Heaven by Matthew Wilder – Demo
- Lucky Lucy and The Fortune Man by Corinna Manetto and Ronald Bazarini – Demo
- "Love Is Worth It If Together We've Cried" co-written with Eric Allaman, from the soundtrack from the film "Midnight Blue"
- "Ave Maria" from the soundtrack for the film The Glass Jar
- Night Of A Thousand Voices, A Tribute to John Kander and Fred Ebb – Live from Royal Albert Hall, London, 2007
- The News by Paul Schierhorn – Demo
- Deep Song – music by Mchael Moricz, lyrics by Eduardo Machado and Michael Moricz Demo
- Wake Up – Music by Eric Allaman Demo
- Kiss of the Spider Woman (Original Toronto Cast Press Demo)

== Filmography ==
- 1979: Bog - Hunter
- 1988: Crocodile Dundee II - Subway Hitman
- 1988: Shakedown - Punk on the Roller Coaster
- 1988: Spellbinder - Aldys Rule
- 1989: Slaves of New York - Hairdresser
- 1990: The Lost Capone - Frank Capone
- 1992: The Bet - Carbo
- 1995: Dillinger and Capone - Lou Gazzo
- 1995: Monster Mash: The Movie - Count Vladimir Dracula
- 1996: Alien Avengers - Jesse Sharp
- 1996: Independence Day - Lincoln
- 1997: Twisted - Eddie
- 1998: Jane Austen's Mafia! - Luigi Cortino
- 2001: Texas Rangers - Ringmaster
- 2003: Alien Hunter - Pilot
- 2006: Material Girls - Surly Man
- 2006: Trade Detective Henderson
- 2014: Henry Toy (Short) - Henry Toy
- 2016: Emma's Chance - Wade Thompson
- 2016: The Mark (Short) - Boonie
- 2021: Black Easter Ram's Father
- 2022: Children of God - Joe
- 2025: The Omro Heist - Police Chief D. W. Johnson
- 2026: BATMAN: Knightfall Part 1 - Franco Bertinelli, Priest, Prisoner, Hoodlum who loses his arms.
- 2026: White Knuckle Day (Short) - Azoff

== Television ==
- 1988 – Miguel Carrera, "Hostile Takeover," Miami Vice, NBC
- 1990 – Celine, "Prisoner of Love," Law & Order, NBC
- 1990 – Johnny Dee, One Life to Live, ABC
- 1995 – 919 Fifth Avenue (also known as Dominick Dunne's 919 Fifth Avenue)
- 1996 – Adin, "Warlord," Star Trek: Voyager, UPN
- 1996 – Grantaire, Les Misérables: The Dream Cast in Concert – Live from London's Royal Albert Hall, Great Performances PBS
- 1997 – Linder, "Everything to Fear," Team Knight Rider
- 1998 – John, "No Compromises," Babylon 5
- 1998 – Maxwell, "The Maid," Seinfeld, NBC
- 2000 – Reverend Burns, "Just Another Normal Christmas," Normal, Ohio, Fox Broadcasting Company
- 2002 – Band Leader, "Love Is the Key," In-Laws, NBC
- 2003 – Albert DiSalvo, "Strangled," Crossing Jordan, NBC
- 2003 – Maître d', "The Placeholder," Frasier, NBC
- 2005 – Ringmaster, "Blood, Sweat, and Tears," CSI: NY, CBS
- 2013 – Stage Hand, Behind the Candelabra HBO
- 2015 – Valentin, Great Performances Kiss of the Spider Woman, PBS – Chita Rivera: A Lot of Livin' to Do
- 2017 – David Lean, Feud: Bette and Joan; FX

== Other work ==
=== Voice overs ===
- "Jethro" in The Merry Beggqars 40 part series/audio production of "THE EXODUS"
- "Alessandro Serenelli" in The Merry Beggars’ 5 part series/audio production of MARIA GORETTI “The Saints"
- Nobody Studios/Promotional-Parentipity
- Crazy Ex-Girlfriend/Looping-CW Network
- Mistresses/Looping-ABC
- NASCAR/VO / TV Spot-NBC
- The Black List (Promo)-NBC
- Domino's/"Braveheart" Manager
- Atlantic Bell Telephone/Pizza Restaurant Owner

=== Video games ===
- Raven/WB ‘’Quiddich’'
- Witches/Formosa Interactive
- Midnight/Formosa Interactive
- Ubisoft/Company CEO 'Tony'/Ubisoft
- Hot Shots Golf Fore!/SONY PlayStation

=== Commercials ===
- Peugeot (UK/Europe)/Principal Performer
- Silo Audio/Video NYC
- Cherry 7-up /Leo Burnett
- Security Force/ "Monsters"/Frankenstein
- FIAT 500 "Tony Fixes It" SUV 2015 /Tony
- FIAT / Various TV- Internet/ Funny or Die
- FIAT 500 "Tony Fixes It" SEDAN 2015 /Tony
- FIAT / Various TV- Internet/ Funny or Die

=== Audio books ===
- Calvin The Christmas Tree
- Christmas Is
- Christmas Is Special Things
- Grandma's Spooky House
- Winston Has Lunch
