= John Caird (director) =

English theatre director and writer (born 1948)

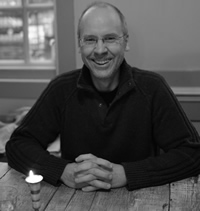
- Caird in 2011
- Born: John Newport Caird; 22 September 1948 (age 78); Edmonton, Alberta, Canada
- Spouse(s): Helen Brammer (m. 1970; div. 19??); Ann Dorszynski (m. 1982; div. 19??) Frances Ruffelle (m. 1990; div. 1993) Maoko Imai (m. 1998)
- Children: 8, including Eliza
- Awards: Laurence Olivier Award for Best Director; 1980 The Life and Adventures of Nicholas Nickleby; Tony Award for Best Direction of a Play; 1982 The Life and Adventures of Nicholas Nickleby; Tony Award for Best Direction of a Musical; 1987 Les Misérables
- Website: johncaird.com

John Newport Caird (born 22 September 1948) is an English stage director and writer of plays, musicals and operas. He is an honorary associate director of the Royal Shakespeare Company, was for many years a regular director with the Royal National Theatre of Great Britain and the principal guest director of the Royal Dramatic Theatre, Stockholm (Dramaten).

== Early years ==
Caird was born in Edmonton, Alberta, Canada, to English parents George Bradford Caird, Oxford theologian and principal of Mansfield College, Oxford and Viola Mary Newport (born 1922 in Reigate, Surrey), poet and librarian.

He lived in Montreal and attended Selwyn House School. His family moved back to England in 1959 to Oxford, where he attended Magdalen College School from 1959 to 1967. He studied acting at the Bristol Old Vic Theatre School from 1967 to 1969.

Caird worked as an actor and stage manager at various English repertory theatres and in London's West End before embarking on his directorial career at Contact Theatre, in Manchester in 1973.

== Career ==
=== Theatre ===
Caird was an associate director of Contact Theatre for two years, from 1973 to 1975, where he directed plays by Shakespeare, Christopher Bond, John Osborne, James Saunders, Samuel Beckett, wrote and acted in Theatre in Education programmes for Manchester's schools and prisons, and was an actor and musician in plays by Brecht, Goldoni, and Jellicoe.

He then worked as a freelance director for various fringe theatre companies. For Sidewalk Theatre he directed Last Resort by Peter Flannery. For Avon Touring he directed Regina versus Stephens by the late David Illingworth.

Caird also taught for one semester at the University of Ottawa Drama Department, Canada, where he directed The Changeling by Middleton and Rowley. In 1975, he founded, with Stephen Barlow and others, Circle of Muses – a touring music theatre troupe that took musical entertainments around classical music clubs in England and Wales.

In 1977, Caird joined the Royal Shakespeare Company as assistant director, becoming a resident director in December 1977 and an associate director in 1980.

From 1977 to 1990, Caird directed over 20 productions for the RSC, including Shakespeare's Twelfth Night with Zoë Wanamaker, John Thaw, Daniel Massey, and Emrys James, Romeo and Juliet with Daniel Day-Lewis, Amanda Root, and Roger Allam, Midsummer Night's Dream with John Carlisle, Clare Higgins, and Richard McCabe, Merchant of Venice, As You Like It, and Antony and Cleopatra.

At the RSC's Swan Theatre he directed Ben Jonson's comedies Every Man in His Humour with Simon Russell Beale, Henry Goodman and Pete Postlethwaite and The New Inn with John Carlisle and Fiona Shaw, the first night of this play being the second-ever professional performance since it first appeared in 1629. His last production at the Swan was his own new version of John Gay's The Beggar's Opera with music composed by Ilona Sekacz.

Caird's other productions at the RSC included classic works by Farquhar, Shaw, Strindberg, Gorky and Brecht and world premières of plays by Peter Flannery, Jonathan Gems, Mary O'Malley, John Berger, Nella Bielski, Charles Wood, and Richard Nelson.

At the RSC Caird also co-directed four productions with Trevor Nunn. The first was Merry Wives of Windsor in 1978 with Ben Kingsley, David Threlfall, and Timothy Spall. Next was Nicholas Nickleby in 1980, a nine-hour adaption from Dickens by David Edgar that ran for three separate seasons at the Aldwych Theatre and then transferred to the Plymouth Theatre on Broadway. Caird and Nunn then collaborated on a new version of J. M. Barrie's Peter Pan, the first-ever production of the play to use a male actor in the title role. The production ran for three consecutive seasons at the Barbican Theatre from 1982 to 1984, with Miles Anderson, Mark Rylance and John McAndrew all playing Peter. Lastly Les Misérables in 1985, a musical by Claude-Michel Schönberg and Alain Boublil that was a co-production between the RSC and Cameron Mackintosh. It ran for eight weeks at the Barbican Theatre before transferring to the Palace Theatre in the West End, moving to the Queen's Theatre in 2004, where it is still running. It opened at The Broadway Theatre in New York in 1987 and thereafter has played all over the world.

Caird started directing at London's Royal National Theatre in 1993 under the artistic directorship of Richard Eyre. His first production was Trelawney of the 'Wells' with Helen McCrory and Robin Bailey. Chekhov's The Seagull followed in 1994 in a new version by Pam Gems with Judi Dench, Helen McCrory and Bill Nighy. In 1996, he directed the world premiere of Pam Gems' play Stanley based on the life of the English painter Stanley Spencer, with Antony Sher in the title role. Stanley later transferred to the Circle in the Square Theatre on Broadway. He continued to direct plays at the National under the Artistic Directorship of Trevor Nunn with Peter Pan in 1997 starring Daniel Evans as Pan and Ian McKellen as Hook and, in the NT Ensemble season of 1999, Bulwer-Lytton's Money and his own new version of the Voltaire/Bernstein Candide, both with Simon Russell Beale and the late Denis Quilley. In 2000, he again directed Simon Russell Beale, this time in Hamlet, a production that toured the UK and Europe, going to Elsinore, Stockholm and Belgrade, before transferring to the Brooklyn Academy (BAM) in New York. Caird's last production at the National Theatre was the world première of Humble Boy by Charlotte Jones, with Diana Rigg and Simon Russell Beale. The play transferred to the Gielgud Theatre in the West End where Felicity Kendal joined the cast and it opened in New York in 2003 at Manhattan Theatre Club.

Caird's other productions in the West End have included Macbeth at the Almeida Theatre with Simon Russell Beale and Emma Fielding, Anouilh's Becket at the Theatre Royal Haymarket with Jasper Britton and Dougray Scott, Charles Dyer's Rattle of a Simple Man with Michelle Collins and Stephen Tompkinson and Michael Weller's What the Night Is For with Gillian Anderson and Roger Allam, both at the Comedy Theatre and his own musical Daddy Long Legs at the St James Theatre with Megan McGinnis and Rob Hancock.

In 2015, Caird directed James Phillips' new play McQueen, which opened in May at the St James’s Theatre in May starring Steve Wight and Dianna Agron and transferred to the Haymarket Theatre in the West End in August, starring Wight and Carly Bawden. McQueen was designed by David Farley, with lighting by David Howe, choreography by Chris Marney and sound by John Leonard.

Caird also directed two new Shakespeare productions in 2015: a Japanese language production of Twelfth Night in Tokyo for the Toho Company, opening in March at the Nissay Theatre – and Love's Labour's Lost for the Stratford Festival in Canada with a cast including Mike Shara and Juan Chioran, designs by Patrick Clark, lighting by Michael Walton and music by Josh Schmidt, opening in August and playing in repertoire for the rest of the season.

In the spring of 2017, Caird directed Hamlet at Geigeki Theatre in Tokyo with Seiyo Uchino in the title role.

In 2022, Caird directed and co-adapted, with Maoko Imai, a live theatre version of Hayao Miyazaki's animated film Spirited Away for Toho Company in Japan. The production transferred to the London Coliseum in the West End where it played for a sell-out 18 week run in the spring and summer of 2024.

=== Sweden ===
In 2009, Caird was made principal guest director at Sweden's national stage, the Royal Dramatic Theatre of Stockholm. His first production in Sweden was As You Like It (Som ni vill ha det) for Stadsteatern (Stockholm City Theatre) in 1984, with Stina Ekblad and Mats Bergman. Since then he has directed exclusively for the Royal Dramatic Theatre with A Midsummer Night's Dream (En midsommarnattsdröm) in 2000, Twelfth Night (Trettondagsafton) in 2002, Strindberg's Dödsdansen (The Dance of Death) in 2007 with Stina Ekblad and Örjan Ramberg and The Merry Wives of Windsor (Muntra fruarna i Windsor) with Börje Ahlstedt as Falstaff in 2009.

Caird's production of Shakespeare's The Tempest (Stormen) opened at the Royal Dramatic Theatre in October 2010 with Orjan Ramberg, Stina Ekblad and Jonas Karlsson. He returned to the Royal Dramatic Theatre in 2011 to direct Shakespeare's Romeo and Juliet (Romeo och Julia), starring Christoffer Svensson and Sofia Pekkari.

In February 2014, Caird worked for the first time in the Royal Dramatic Theatre's intimate stage, Målarsalen, where he directed Hjalmar Söderberg's classic Swedish drama Gertrud with Anna Björk, Jonas Malmsjö, Otto Hargne, Magnus Ehrner, and Mia Benson. The play was designed by Jan Lundberg, costumes by Ann-Margret Fyregård, lighting by Hans-Åke Sjöquist and music by William Stenhammer.

=== Japan ===
Caird's Japanese productions started with Les Misérables, which opened at the Imperial Theatre (Teikoku Gekijo) in 1987 and has been running in repertoire with other works at the same location ever since, as well as touring extensively throughout Japan.

In 2006, he directed his own version of The Beggar's Opera for the Nissay Theatre in Tokyo, starring Seiyo Uchino as Macheath, the production being revived in 2008. His 2007 production of A Midsummer Night's Dream (Natsu no Yo no Yume) for the New National Theatre (Shinkokuritsu Gekijo) was revived in 2009. His play Kinshu adapted from Teru Miyamoto's famous novel opened at the Galaxy Theatre in 2007 and was revived in 2009. He has also directed Coward's Private Lives (Shiseikatsu) at Theatre Crié in 2008 and Jane Eyre at the Nissay Theatre in 2009.

In 2010, Caird directed his own National Theatre version of Bernstein's Candide at the Imperial Theatre in Tokyo, starring Inoue Yoshio and Ichimura Masachika.

He returned to Tokyo in the summer of 2012 to direct the Japanese première of his musical Daddy Long Legs at Theatre Crié, with music by Paul Gordon and Japanese libretto and lyrics by Maoko Imai. The production was designed by David Farley, and starred Maaya Sakamoto and Yoshio Inoue. The production has been revived since then on numerous occasions, with the same cast and was filmed by Wowow Television. In the summer of 2022, the same production will open with Mone Kamishiraishi playing the part of Jerusha and Yoshio Inoue continuing in the role of Jervis.

His revival of the Shochiku production of Jane Eyre opened at the Nissay Theatre in the autumn of 2012 and toured to Hakata-za in Kyushu. Daddy Long Legs was revived at Theatre Crié in January 2013 and again in 2014 and 2015. Further revivals are to be programmed for 2019 and beyond. A CD of the songs and a DVD of the show were both released by Toho in 2014.

In the spring of 2015, Caird directed a new production of Shakespeare's Twelfth Night for the Toho Company at the Nissay Theatre in Tokyo, starring Kei Otozuki, Tomoko Nakajima, Satoshi Hashimoto and Songha. The play was translated by Kazuko Matsuoka, with song lyrics by Maoko Imai, designs by the late Johan Engels, lighting by Ryuichi Nakagawa and music by John Cameron.

In 2017, Caird directed Hamlet at Geigeki Theatre in Tokyo with Seiyo Uchino in the title role, Jun Kunimura as Claudius, Yuko Asano as Gertrude and Shihori Kanjiya as Ophelia. The play was translated by Kazuko Matsuoka and Maoko Imai, Yukio Horio designed the sets, Nobuko Miyamoto designed the costumes, the lighting was by Ryuichi Nakagawa and Dozan Fujiwara composed and performed the music.

Caird directed the world première of his new musical Knight's Tale, with music by Paul Gordon and Japanese libretto and lyrics by Maoko Imai, at the Imperial Theatre in Tokyo in July 2018, starring Koichi Doumoto and Yoshio Inoue. The show was orchestrated by Brad Haak, designed by Jon Bausor, choreographed by David Parsons and lit by Ryuichi Nakagawa. Knight's Tale was revived in a lockdown concert version in 2020, playing in the Geigeki Concert Hall in Ikebukuro and Opera City Concert Hall in Hatsudai. Caird directed remotely from London. The production was revived in full in the autumn of 2021 at Umegei Theatre in Osaka and subsequently played at the Imperial Theatre in Tokyo and at Hakata-za in Fukuoka. In the summer of 2025, a new concert version of Knight’s Tale was mounted at the 6,000 seat Garden Theatre in Tokyo, where it played for 12 sell-out performances.

Caird wrote and directed a new theatre adaptation of Hayao Miyazaki's Studio Ghibli anime, Spirited Away, produced by Toho. It opened in Tokyo in February 2022, subsequently touring to Osaka, Hakata, Sapporo and Nagoya. The production was co-adapted by Caird and Maoko Imai and designed by Jon Bausor, with Toby Olié designing and directing the puppets. Brad Haak arranged and orchestrated Joe Hisaishi's musical score and Jiro Katsushiba directed the lighting. The play starred Kanna Hashimoto, and Mone Kamishiraishi, both playing the role of Chihiro. The entire company transferred the show to the London Coliseum in the spring and summer of 2024.

=== Opera ===
In opera, Caird has directed Mozart's Zaide with a new libretto by Italo Calvino at Musica nel Chiostro, the Batignano Opera Festival in Tuscany, in 1991, conducted by Paul McGrath. In 2005, he directed Verdi's Don Carlos at the Welsh National Opera in Cardiff, conducted by Carlo Rizzi. In the same year, he directed a staged reading of The Screams of Kitty Genovese, a new opera by Will Todd and David Simpatico at the Public Theater in New York.

He remounted Don Carlos for the Canadian Opera Company in Toronto in October 2007 and directed a new production of Verdi's Aida for WNO in 2008.

In 2007–2008, he wrote the libretto for Brief Encounter, a new opera by André Previn based on the play Still Life by Noël Coward and the Brief Encounter screenplay by Coward and David Lean. The opera had its world première performance at Houston Grand Opera in 2009 conducted by Patrick Summers and starring Elizabeth Futral and Nathan Gunn with designs by Bunny Christie. Brief Encounter is published by G. Schirmer's in New York and a CD of the original live production was released by Deutsche Grammophon in April 2011.

Caird directed Puccini's Tosca for HGO for the 2010 season, with Patricia Racette as Tosca, Alexey Dolgov as Cavaradossi and Raymond Aceto as Scarpia, conducted by Patrick Summers with designs by Bunny Christie.

Caird returned to WNO in the autumn of 2011 to direct a new production of Mozart's Don Giovanni, conducted by Lothar Koenigs with designs by John Napier and lighting by David Hersey. David Kempster sang the title role with David Soar as Leporello, Nuccia Focile as Elvira and Canilla Roberts as Anna.

He returned to Houston Grand Opera in April 2012 to direct Verdi's Don Carlos, conducted by Patrick Summers. This was the third leg of a co-production with Welsh National Opera and Canadian Opera Company.

In October 2012, Caird mounted a new production of Puccini's La Bohème for Houston Grand Opera, conducted by Evan Rogister with designs by David Farley and lighting by Michael Clark. This co-production with Canadian Opera Company and San Francisco Opera opened in Toronto in the autumn of 2013, conducted by Carlo Rizzi and San Francisco in 2014, conducted by Giuseppe Finzi.

In May 2013, Caird's production of Tosca opened in Los Angeles at LA Opera, conducted by Plácido Domingo with Sondra Radvanovsky in the title role, Marco Berti as Cavaradossi and Lado Ataneli as Scarpia.

In November 2013, Caird directed a new production of Wagner's Parsifal at the Lyric Opera of Chicago, conducted by Sir Andrew Davis with sets by Johan Engels. The singers included Paul Groves, in the title role, Kwangchul Youn as Gurnemanz and Thomas Hampson as Amfortas. Daveda Karanas sang Kundry and Tomas Tomasson was Klingor. This production was revived at Houston Grand Opera in January 2024, with Russell Thomas in the title role, Ryan McKinney as Amfortas, Andrea Silvestrelli as Klingsor, and Kwangchul Youn repeating the role of Gurnemanz. Kundry was sung by Elena Pankratova. The conductor was Eun Sun Kim.

In 2015, Caird remounted his production of Tosca for both the Lyric Opera of Chicago and Houston Grand Opera. The Chicago production was conducted by Dmitri Jurowski with Tatiana Serjan in the title role, Brian Jagde as Cavaradossi and Evgeny Nikitin as Scarpia. In Houston, Patrick Summers conducted and the roles were sung by Liudmyla Monastyrska, Alexey Dolgov and Andrzej Dobber.

In 2017, Caird’s productions of Tosca and La Bohème were revived at LA Opera and San Francisco Opera respectively. In LA, Sondra Radvanovsky once again sang the title role in Tosca with Russell Thomas as Cavaradossi and Ambrogio Maestri as Scarpia. James Conlon conducted. In San Francsisco, Carlo Montanaro conducted Bohème with Erika Grimaldi and Julie Adams sharing the role of Mimi, Ellie Dehn as Musetta, Arturo Chacón-Cruz as Rodolfo and Audun Iversen as Marcello.

The same production of Bohème will be revived at Houston Grand Opera in the autumn of 2018 with James Lowe conducting, Nicole Heaston as Mimi, Ivan Magri as Rodolfo, Michael Sumuel as Marcello and Pureum Jo as Musetta.

Caird's adaptation of Bernstein’s musical Candide, originally written and staged for the National Theatre in London in 1999, is increasingly being used by opera companies, most recently in Francesca Zambello's production for the Glimmerglass Festival in New York, Bordeaux Opera and Los Angeles Opera and Martin Berger's production for Weimar Opera in Germany.

In February 2018, Caird's production of Mozart's Don Giovanni was revived at Welsh National Opera, where it was staged by Caroline Chaney, with James Southall conducting.

In 2019, Caird directed the world première of his new opera The Phoenix, with music by Tarik O’Regan, at Houston Grand Opera. The story was derived from the life of Mozart's librettist, Lorenzo Da Ponte. Patrick Summers conducted the opera with Thomas Hampson and Luca Pisaroni playing Da Ponte at different stages of his life. The designs were by David Farley with lighting by Michael Clarke and choreography by Tim Claydon.

In the spring of 2022, Caird directed Monteverdi's Orfeo for Garsington Opera in the UK. Laurence Cummings conducted the English Concert, Rob Jones designed the set and costumes, Arielle Smith was the choreographer and Paul Pyant was the lighting designer. Ed Lyon sung the role of Orfeo and Diana Montague was the Messenger. In the summer of 2026 Caird directed a new production of Monteverdi’s Il ritorno d’Ulisse in patria for Garsington Opera with Laurence Cummings and the English Concert, working with the same creative team as in their production of Orfeo in 2022. Ed Lyon and Cecelia Hall led the cast in the rôles of Ulisse and Penelope. The same creative team will complete the Monteverdi cycle at Garsington in 2028 with L’Incoronazione di Poppea.

=== Musical theatre ===
Caird's introduction to musical theatre was directing the world première production of Andrew Lloyd Webber's Song and Dance, which ran at the Palace Theatre in London from 1982 to 1984.

Caird adapted and co-directed, with Trevor Nunn, Schönberg and Boublil's Les Misérables for the RSC and Cameron Mackintosh. The show opened at the Barbican Theatre in 1985, transferring to the Palace Theatre in November 1985 and later to the Queen's Theatre in Shaftebury Avenue, where it is still running after 31 years, the longest running musical in the West End.

Caird also wrote and directed Children of Eden with music by Stephen Schwartz, which ran in the West End in 1991. Since being published by Music Theatre International in 1998 Children of Eden has now had over 2000 separate productions worldwide.

Caird also wrote and directed Jane Eyre with music by Paul Gordon, which played in La Jolla, Toronto and at the Brooks Atkinson Theatre on Broadway from 1998 to 2000 and Leonard Bernstein's Candide which he adapted from the original Voltaire novel for the National Theatre season of 1999. Jane Eyre and Candide have since both been published by Music Theatre International and have had numerous productions across the US and worldwide. His version of Candide is now being used by opera companies all around the world, most recently in Weimar, Bordeaux, Los Angeles and the Glimmerglass Festival in New York.

The Japanese première of Caird's version of Candide opened at the Imperial Theatre in Tokyo in June 2010, directed by Caird and designed by Yoon Bae, after the original designs by John Napier.

Caird also wrote and directed, with the designer John Napier, The Siegfried and Roy Spectacular, a magic show for the Mirage Hotel in Las Vegas, starring Siegfried Fischbacher and Roy Horn and their menagerie of white tigers. The show opened in February 1991 and ran until October 2004, finally closing when Roy was injured by one of his beloved tigers.

Caird's adaptation of Daddy Long Legs, Jean Webster's classic novel, with music by Paul Gordon, had its world première at the Rubicon Theatre in Ventura, California in 2009, starring Megan McGinnis and Robert Adelman Hancock before touring to Palo Alto, Cincinnati and numerous other theatres in the US. Daddy Long Legs won three LA Ovation Awards and transferred to London in the autumn of 2012 where it played at the newly opened St James Theatre. In September 2015, the show opened in New York at the Davenport Theatre, off-Broadway, with Megan McGinnis and Paul Nolan as Jerusha and Jervis. Adam Halpin replaced Paul Nolan later in the run and the show was recorded with Halpin and McGinnis for Broadway HD. Daddy Long Legs was published by Music Theatre International in 2016 and has had numerous productions all around the world.

In collaboration with Paul Gordon and Sam Caird, Caird wrote and directed an up-dated amalgamation of Dickens's novels A Christmas Carol and Great Expectations, entitled Little Miss Scrooge. It previewed at the Rubicon Theatre in Ventura, California, in December 2012 and had its first full production there in December 2013. It was subsequently rewritten and retitled Estella Scrooge and premièred in a film version in the autumn of 2020.

In 2018, Caird directed the world première of his own new musical Knights' Tale, based on Fletcher's & Shakespeare's Two Noble Kinsmen, Chaucer’s Knight’s Tale and Boccaccio’s Teseida, translated into Japanese by Maoko Imai. Paul Gordon was the composer and lyricist, Brad Haak the orchestrator, David Parsons the choreographer, Jon Bausor and Jean Chan designed set and costumes and Ryuichi Nakagawa was the lighting designer. The show opened at the Imperial Theatre in Tokyo with Yoshio Inoue and Koichi Doumoto as Palamon and Arcite, Kei Otozuki as Emilia and Mone Kamishiraishi as Flavina, before transferring to the Umeda Arts Theatre in Osaka.

=== Film and television ===
Caird's television work includes his own adaptation of Shakespeare's plays Henry IV, Parts 1 and 2 for the BBC's performance series in 1995, starring David Calder, Ronald Pickup, Rufus Sewell, Jonathan Firth, Elizabeth Spriggs, Simon McBurney, Jane Horrocks and Paul Eddington amongst others.

Many of Caird's theatrical productions have been filmed or televised: Nicholas Nickleby directed by Jim Goddard for Primetime Television in 1982 won an Emmy Award for outstanding limited series. Swedish TV have screened As You Like It and Dödsdansen. WOWOW Television in Japan have screened Jane Eyre, The Beggar's Opera and Daddy Long Legs while NHK have screened Kinshu and Hamlet. Daddy Long Legs was filmed by Broadway HD.

Caird's latest musical Estella Scrooge was released by Streaming Musicals as a Christmas family entertainment in December 2020.

=== Other work ===
Caird has devised and staged two celebrations for WWF, the Worldwide Fund for Nature: the Religion and Inter-faith Ceremony at Assisi in 1986 and Gifts for Living Planet at Bakhtapur, Nepal, in 2000.

Caird also devised and directed (with Paul Robertson, the leader of the Medici String Quartet) Intimate Letters, a series of dramatised concerts based on the chamber-works and letters of Janáček, Smetana, Mozart, Elgar, and Beethoven.

In 2001, he set up the Caird Company with Holly Kendrick to encourage young playwrights and directors. The company produced a number of rehearsed play-reading festivals in fringe theatres and rehearsal spaces all around London, organised writing and directing workshops and seminars and produced Theatre Café, a festival of European Theatre at the Arcola Theatre, The Arab-Israeli Cookbook, a verbatim play by Robin Soans at the Gate Theatre and the Lemon Princess by Rachel McGill for West Yorkshire Playhouse.

Caird directed a production of the melodrama, Murder in the Red Barn for marionette puppets, as a fund-raiser to save the Tiller-Clowes Marionettes for the nation at the Britten Theatre, Royal College of Music, starring Joanna Lumley, Gary Kemp, Bill Nighy and others.

For the 25th anniversary of the National Theatre, Caird directed the NT 'Chain Play', a drama written in 25 consecutive scenes by 25 NT dramatists.

In 2005, Caird wrote and directed Twin Spirits, a dramatised concert based on the music and letters of Robert and Clara Schumann, in aid of the Royal Opera House, Covent Garden's educational outreach programme. It was produced by June Chichester and starred amongst others Sting, Trudie Styler, Ian McKellen, Simon Keenlyside, and Rebecca Evans. Since then it has played at numerous venues in Europe and America, always for charitable causes – at the New Victory Theater on Broadway in aid of Broadway Cares/Equity Fights Aids, at Windsor Castle in aid of the Prince's Trust and the Soil Association, at Salisbury Cathedral in aid of the Choir Foundation, at the Cortona Festival in Tuscany in aid of the Mustardseed Trust and at the Lincoln Center in New York and at the Mark Taper Forum, Los Angeles in aid of Music Unites. The performers for these venues have included Derek Jacobi, Joshua Bell, Natasha Paremski, Natalie Clein, Jonathan Pryce, Jeremy Denk, and John Lithgow. The concert was televised by Opus Arte at the Royal Opera House and is now available on DVD.

In March 2014, Caird devised and directed At Home in the World – a charity concert in collaboration with the Japanese orphan's charity Ashinaga and Vassar College of New York, involving young musicians and dancers from Japan, Uganda and America. The concert was performed in theatres in Tokyo and Tohoku, the area of Japan badly affected by the tsunami of 2011. At Home in the World was revived in 2015 at the Rose Theatre, Lincoln Centre, New York and the Warner Theatre in Washington DC with new songs by Matt Gould and Tarik O'Regan and choreography by Griffin Matthews. In 2016, the third leg of the journey was completed with a visit to Kampala, Uganda where the young performers played an outdoor gala at the Ndere Centre in support of Ashinaga's African Initiative.

In 2016, Caird co-curated and directed, with Tom Morris and Emily Blacksell, the Bristol Old Vic Theatre's 250th Anniversary Gala - with a star-studded cast of BOV alumni, including Stephanie Cole, Pippa Haywood, Toby Jones, Michael Morpurgo, Sian Phillips, Tim Pigott-Smith, Caroline Quentin, and Timothy West.

In 2025, Caird contributed an English Kyrie and Dies Irae for Tarik O'Regan’s Critcal Mass, first performed at Cadogan Hall in London in April 2026.

=== Writing ===
Caird's book about directing for the stage, Theatre Craft, was published by Faber and Faber in March 2010 in London and New York.

=== Mustardseed Trust ===
Caird founded the Mustardseed Arts and Educational Trust in 2001 to encourage and promote Artistic and Educational projects, especially in the developing world. In 2018, Mustardseed Trust, in partnership with Magdalen College School, Oxford, Ambrosoli School, Kampala and Kenneth Buwule, Head Teacher, founded the building and establishment of Mustardseed Junior School in Sentema, Uganda.

=== Personal life ===
Caird has been married four times and has four sons and four daughters. His first marriage was to Helen Brammer in Oxford in 1970. His second was to Ann Dorszynski (Annie Caird) in Finsbury, London, in 1982. They have three children: Joanna (Jo) (born 29 January 1983), Benjamin (Ben) (born 10 October 1984) and Samuel (Sam) (born 8 July 1987). His third was to Frances Ruffelle in 1990, in Westminster, London. They have two children: Eliza (born 15 April 1988) and Nathaniel (born 17 June 1990). His fourth was to Maoko Imai in Argiano, Italy, in 1998. They have three children: Yoji (born 19 October 1998), Miyako (Mimi) (born 18 January 2000) and Yayako (Yaya) (born 14 March 2002).

His elder brother James is an architect, town planner and heritage consultant. His younger brother George (Geordie) is an oboist and principal emeritus of the Birmingham Conservatoire. His sister Dr. Margaret (Meg) Laing (1953–2023) was research fellow in mediaeval dialectology at the University of Edinburgh.

Caird is an honorary Fellow of Mansfield College, Oxford, an honorary member of the Royal Academy of Music, an honorary Fellow of the Royal Welsh College of Music & Drama (Coleg Brenhinol Cerdd a Drama Cymru) has an honorary D.Litt. from the University of East Anglia and is a Companion of LIPA (The Liverpool Institute for Performing Arts). He is also a member of the Kenjin-Tatsujin Council for the orphans charity Ashinaga Ikuekai in Japan.

== Stage productions ==
1977: Dance of Death (Other Place, Warehouse & Aldwych, London 1978)

1978: Savage Amusement (Warehouse)

1978: Look Out! Here Comes Trouble (Warehouse)

1978: The Adventures of Awful Knawful (Warehouse)

1979: Merry Wives of Windsor (Stratford & Aldwych, 1980)

1979: Caucasian Chalk Circle (Touring & Warehouse Theatre)

1980: The Life and Adventures of Nicholas Nickleby (Aldwych 1980–1)

1981: Naked Robots (Warehouse)

1981: The Twin Rivals (Other Place & The Pit Theatre, London, 1982)

1982: Nicholas Nickleby (Plymouth Theatre, Broadway)

1982: Song and Dance (Palace Theatre, London)

1982: Our Friends in the North (Other Place, The Pit Theatre, London)

1982: Peter Pan by JM Barrie (Barbican Theatre, London)

1983: Twelfth Night (Stratford)

1984: Romeo and Juliet (Touring, The Other Place & The Pit 1985–6)

1984: The Merchant of Venice (Stratford)

1984: Red Star (The Pit, London)

1984: As You Like It (Som Ni Vill Ha Det) (Stadsteatern, Stockholm)

1984: Nicholas Nickleby (Stratford & Ahmanson Theatre LA & Broadway)

1985: Les Misérables (Barbican, Palace Theatre & Broadway 1986)

1985: Philistines (Other Place & The Pit Theatre, London, 1986)

1986: Misalliance (Barbican)

1986: Every Man in His Humour (The Swan Theatre, Stratford)

1987: The New Inn (The Swan)

1987: Les Misérables (Imperial Theatre, Tokyo)

1988: A Question of Geography (Other Place & The Pit, London)

1989: A Midsummer Night's Dream (Stratford & Barbican & UK Tour, 1990)

1989: As You Like It (Stratford & Barbican, 1990)

1990: Siegfried and Roy Spectacular (Le Mirage, Las Vegas, USA)

1991: Zaïde (Musica nel Chiostro, Batignano, Italy)

1991: Children of Eden (Prince Edward Theatre, London)

1992: Anthony and Cleopatra (Stratford & Barbican, 1993)

1992: Columbus and the Discovery of Japan by Richard Nelson (Barbican)

1992: The Beggar's Opera (Swan Theatre & Barbican, 1993)

1993: Trelawny of the Wells (Olivier Theatre, RNT, London)

1993: Life Sentences (Second Stage Theatre, Broadway, NY)

1994: The Seagull (Olivier Theatre, RNT, London)

1995 The Millionairess (UK Tour)

1996: Stanley (Cottesloe Theatre, RNT & Circle in the Square, Broadway, 1997)

1997: Jane Eyre (Royal Alexandra Theatre, Toronto)

1997: Peter Pan (Olivier Theatre, RNT)

1998: Jane Eyre (La Jolla Playhouse, California)

1999: Candide, (Olivier Theatre, RNT)

1999: Money (Olivier Theatre, RNT)

2000: Hamlet (Olivier Theatre, RNT, Elsinore, EuropeanTour & BAM, 2001)

2000: A Midsummer Night's Dream (En midsommarnattsdröm) (Royal Dramatic Theatre)

2000: Jane Eyre (Broadway)

2001: Humble Boy (Cottesloe Theatre, RNT & Gielgud Theatre, 2002)

2002: Twelfth Night (Trettondagsafton) (Royal Dramatic Theatre, Stockholm)

2002: What the Night is For (Comedy Theatre, London)

2003: Humble Boy (Manhattan Theatre Club, New York)

2004: Rattle of a Simple Man (Comedy Theatre, London)

2004: Becket (Theatre Royal Haymarket, London)

2004: Les Misérables (Queen's Theatre, London)

2005: Macbeth (Almeida Theatre, London)

2005: Twin Spirits (Royal Opera House, Covent Garden)

2005: Don Carlos (Welsh National Opera, Cardiff & UK Tour)

2005: The Screams of Kitty Genovese (Public Theater, New York)

2006: The Beggar's Opera (Nissay Theatre, Tokyo)

2006: Twin Spirits (New Victory Theater, New York)

2006: Les Misérables (Broadhurst Theatre, New York)

2007: Dödsdansen (Royal Dramatic Theatre, Stockholm)

2007: A Midsummer Night's Dream, (Natsu no Yo no Yume) (New National, Tokyo)

2007: Kinshu (Galaxy Theatre, Tokyo)

2007: Don Carlos (Canadian Opera Company, Toronto)

2008: The Beggar's Opera (Nissay Theatre, Tokyo & Osaka)

2008: Aida (Welsh National Opera, Cardiff and Birmingham)

2008: Private Lives (Shiseikatsu) (Theatre Crié, Tokyo)

2009: Merry Wives of Windsor (Muntra fruarna i Windsor) (Royal Dramatic Theatre)

2009: Brief Encounter (Houston Grand Opera)

2009: Midsummer Night's Dream (Natsu no Yo no Yume) (Tokyo & Toyama)

2009: Jane Eyre (Nissay Theatre, Tokyo)

2009: Daddy Long Legs (Rubicon Theatre, Ventura, California)

2009: Kinshu (Galaxy Theatre, Tokyo & Japanese tour)

2010: Tosca (Houston Grand Opera)

2010: Candide (Imperial Theatre, Tokyo)

2010: Daddy Long Legs (US Tour)

2010: The Tempest (Stormen) (Royal Dramatic Theatre)

2011: Romeo and Juliet (Romeo och Julia) (Royal Dramatic Theatre)

2011: Don Giovanni (Welsh National Opera – Cardiff and UK Tour)

2012: Don Carlos (Houston Grand Opera)

2012: Daddy Long Legs (Theatre Crié, Tokyo)

2012: Jane Eyre (Nissay Theatre Tokyo & Hakata-za, Kyushu)

2012: La Bohème (Houston Grand Opera)

2012: Daddy Long Legs (London)

2012: Little Miss Scrooge (Rubicon Theatre, Ventura, California)

2013: Tosca (LA Opera)

2013: La Bohème (Canadian Opera Company, Toronto)

2013: Parsifal (Chicago Lyric Opera)

2013: Little Miss Scrooge (Ventura)

2014: Gertrud (Royal Dramatic Theatre, Stockholm)

2014: La Bohème (San Francisco Opera)

2015: Tosca (Chicago Lyric Opera)

2015: Twelfth Night (Nissay Theatre, Tokyo)

2015: McQueen (St. James & Haymarket Theatres, London)

2015: Love’s Labour’s Lost (Stratford Festival, Canada)

2015: Daddy Long Legs (Davenport Theatre, New York)

2015: Tosca (Houston Grand Opera)

2015: At Home in the World (Tokyo, NY and DC)

2016: At Home in the World (Ndere Centre, Kampala)

2017: Hamlet (Geigeki Theatre, Tokyo)

2017: La Bohème (San Francisco)

2018: Don Giovanni (WNO, Cardiff)

2018: Knights’ Tale (Imperial Theatre, Tokyo)

2019: The Phoenix (Houston Grand Opera)

2020: Estella Scrooge (Streaming Musicals)

2021: Knights’ Tale (Tokyo and Japan Tour)

2022: Spirited Away (Tokyo and Japan Tour)

2022: Orfeo (Garsington Opera)

2024: Parsifal (Houston Grand Opera)

2024: Spirited Away (London Coliseum)

2025: La Bohème (Houston Grand Opera)

2025: Spirited Away (Shanghai)

2025: Knights’ Tale Concert (Tokyo)

2025: Daddy Long Legs (Tokyo)

2026: Spirited Away (Seoul)

2026: Il ritorno d’Ulisse in patria (Garsington Opera)

== Publications ==
- Peter Pan Dramatists Play Service, NY (1987)
- Children of Eden Music Theatre International, NY (1997)
- The Beggar's Opera Dramatists Play Service, NY (1999)
- Peter Pan Methuen Publishing, UK (1999)
- Candide Music Theatre International, NY (2002)
- Jane Eyre Music Theatre International, NY (2003)
- Daddy Long Legs Music Theatre International, NY (2016)
- Theatre Craft Faber & Faber (2010)

== Recordings ==
- Les Misérables, First Night Records, 1985 (& numerous further cast recordings worldwide.)
- Children of Eden, First Night Records, 1991 (& RCA Victor/BMG 1998).
- The Beggar's Opera, London Records, 1992.
- Jane Eyre, Angel Records, 1998 (& Sony Music Entertainment 2000).
- Candide, RNT & First Night Records, 2000.
- Daddy Long Legs (Paul Gordon Music) 2010
- Brief Encounter Deutsche Grammophon (2011)
- Daddy Long Legs (Toho Records) 2014
- Daddy Long Legs (Ghostlight Records 2015)

== Awards ==
1980 Laurence Olivier Award for Best Director for Nicholas Nickleby.

1981 Evening Standard Drama Award for Best Director for Nicholas Nickleby.

1982 Tony Award for Best Director for Nicholas Nickleby.

1982 Outer Critics Circle Award, Special Citation for Nicholas Nickleby.

1987 Outer Critics Circle Award for Outstanding Director of a Musical for Les Misérables.

1987 Tony Award for Best Director for Les Misérables.

1994 Laurence Olivier Award (Nomination) for Best Director of a Musical for The Beggar's Opera

1994 Laurence Olivier Award (Nomination) for Best Musical Revival for The Beggar's Opera

1997 Outer Critics Circle Award for Outstanding Director of a Play for Stanley

1997 Tony Award (Nomination) for Best Direction of a Play for Stanley

1999 Laurence Olivier Award for Best Musical Revival for Candide.

2001 Outer Critics Circle Award (Nomination) Outstanding Broadway Musical for Jane Eyre

2001 Tony Award (Nomination) for Best Musical for Jane Eyre

2001 Tony Award (Nomination) for Best Original Score for Jane Eyre

2001 Tony Award (Nomination) for Best Book of a Musical for Jane Eyre

2006 Nippon Engeki Kogyo Kyukai Award for Kinshu, Midsummer Night's Dream and Beggar's Opera.

2007 Kikuta Kazuo Theatre Award for Special Achievement in Japanese Theatre

2010 LA Ovation Award (Nomination) for Director of a Musical for Daddy Long Legs

2010 LA Ovation Award for Book of a Musical for Daddy Long Legs

2016 Drama Desk Award (Nomination) for Outstanding Musical for Daddy Long Legs

2016 Drama Desk Award for Outstanding Book of a Musical for Daddy Long Legs

2022 Nippon Engeki Kogyo Kyukai Award for Spirited Away

2023 Royal Philharmonic Society Awards (Shortlist) Orfeo

2025 What's On Stage Award for Best New Play - Spirited Away

2025 Olivier Award (nomination) for Best Entertainment - Spirited Away
