= Daddy Long Legs (musical) =

2007 musical by Paul Gordon and John Caird

- Off-Broadway artwork
- Music: Paul Gordon
- Lyrics: Paul Gordon
- Book: John Caird
- Setting: Early 20th century, New England
- Basis: Daddy-Long-Legs by Jean Webster
- Premiere: October 17, 2009: Rubicon Theatre, Ventura County, California
- Productions: 2009 Ventura County, California; 2012 West End; 2015 Off-Broadway
- Awards: Drama Desk Award for Outstanding Book of a Musical; Ovation Award for Book of an Original Musical; Ovation Award for Lyrics/Music of an Original Musical

Daddy Long Legs is a stage musical with a book by John Caird, and music and lyrics by Paul Gordon. It is based on the 1912 novel of the same name by Jean Webster. Set in turn-of-the-century New England, the musical tells the story of orphan Jerusha Abbott of the John Grier Home and her mysterious benefactor who agrees to send her to college, who she dubs "Daddy Long Legs" after seeing his elongated shadow. Under the conditions of her benefactor, Jerusha sends him a letter once a month, describing her new-found experiences with life outside the orphanage.

The musical was developed as part of the Ann Deal/Fashion Forms Plays-in-Progress Series at Rubicon Theatre in Ventura County, California in 2007. It was co-premiered by the Rubicon, TheatreWorks Silicon Valley, and Cincinnati Playhouse in 2009–2010. The musical then premiered in London's West End at the St. James Theatre in 2012, and Off-Broadway at the Davenport Theatre in 2015. The musical opened in Tokyo in 2012 and Canada in 2013.

== Productions ==
=== World premiere ===
Workshop readings for the musical were done at the Rubicon Theatre Company as early as 2008, with Leslie Henstock as Jerusha and Robert Adelman Hancock as Jervis. The world-premier was a co-production with Rubicon, TheatreWorks Silicon Valley, and the Cincinnati Playhouse in the Park, beginning at the Rubicon Theatre on October 17, 2009, with direction by John Caird, music and lyrics by Paul Gordon, musical direction by Laura Bergquist, scenic and costume design by David Farley, lighting design by Paul Toben, and sound design by Jonathan Burke. Megan McGinnis starred as Jerusha Abbott and Hancock starred as Jervis Pendleton. The same cast and production team continued onto a production at TheatreWorks Silicon Valley, January 20 - February 14, which extended through February 21, 2010 followed by a production at the Cincinnati Playhouse in the Park March 13 – April 10, 2010.

=== West End ===
The production opened in London's West End at the St. James Theatre on October 31, 2012, and ran until December 08. McGinnis and Hancock returned to their roles as Jerusha Abbott and Jervis Pendleton.

=== Off-Broadway ===
Producers Ken Davenport and Michael Jackowitz presented a private New York industry reading of the musical on January 24, 2014, with McGinnis and Hancock reprising their roles. The musical opened Off-Broadway at the Davenport Theatre on September 28, 2015, with an open-ended run. McGinnis reprised her role again, with Paul Alexander Nolan joining her as Jervis Pendleton. In addition to the original creative team, the production has sound design by Peter Fitzgerald, lighting adaptation by Cory Pattak, and musical direction, arrangements, and orchestration by Brad Haak. The role of Jervis was temporarily played by understudy Will Reynolds from October 29 to November 19, after Nolan's departure to join the company of Bright Star. Adam Halpin, McGinnis' real-life husband, then assumed the role on November 20. On November 29, it was announced that the production would be streamed live online on December 10, 2015, becoming the first Broadway or Off-Broadway production to do so. According to the provided statistics, the livestream was watched by 150,055 people from 135 countries. The Off-Broadway production celebrated its 200th performance on March 22, 2016. The production played its final performance on June 6, 2016.

=== US regional productions ===
The production was co-premiered by the Rubicon, TheatreWorks Silicon Valley at the Mountain View Center for the Performing Arts in Mountain View, California from January 20 until February 14, 2010; (extended through February 21), and Cincinnati Playhouse in the Park from March 13 until April 10, 2010; in what was called as a "rolling world premiere," due to the various changes continually made to the show on the road. TheatreWorks Silicon Valley participated in the New York casting, and built the sets, props, and costumes, which were shipped to Rubicon for the initial performances. Subsequent productions included the Northlight Theatre in Illinois from September 16 until October 24, 2010; the Cleveland Play House's Allen Theatre at Playhouse Square from October 21 until November 13, 2011; the Gem Theatre in Detroit, Michigan from October 12 until November 20, 2011; the Merrimack Repertory Theatre in Lowell, Massachusetts from February 9 until March 4, 2012; the Skylight Music Theatre's Cabot Theatre in Milwaukee, Wisconsin from March 9 to April 1, 2012; and Florida Studio Theatre's Gompertz Theatre from February 5 until April 5, 2014. McGinnis and Hancock returned to play the roles of Jerusha and Jervis in some of the stagings. Several stagings featured Ephie Aardema, Christy Altomare and Penny McNamee as Jerusha and Kevin Earley as Jervis. The production was presented a second time by TheatreWorks Silicon Valley, November 30 - December 31, 2016, extended through January 7, 2017. The revival, directed by Robert Kelley, starred Hilary Maiberger and Derek Carley.SimonFest Theatre Company presented the musical in Cedar City, Utah, from July 7 to July 31, 2021, at the Heritage Center Theater, before transferring to the Center for the Arts at Kayenta in Ivins, Utah, where it played August 11–14, 2021. The production was directed by Douglas Hill and starred Sceri Ivers as Jerusha Abbott and Ian Oliver as Jervis Pendleton, with scenic design by Brad Shelton, lighting design by Rebekah Bugg, and costume design by Tonya Christensen.

=== UK regional productions ===
A new production of the musical opened at the Barn Theatre in Cirencester, United Kingdom in October 2019. The production marked the first time the musical had been produced by a British theatre. The production ran from 2 October to 2 November 2019. The production was directed by Kirstie Davis with design by Gregor Donnelly, musical direction by Charlie Ingles, lighting design by Sam Rowcliffe-Tanner and sound design by Christopher Cleal and Harry Smith. It starred Rebecca Jayne-Davies as Jerusha Abbott and Ryan Bennett as Jervis Pendleton.

=== International productions ===
The Australian premiere of Daddy Long Legs opened at the Brisbane Powerhouse in Queensland September 23, 2019. Starring Ella Macrokanis, Jerusha, and Shaun Kohlman, Jervis. Directed by Connor Clarke Nominated for Best Musical - Matilda Awards 2019 and Ella Macrokanis was nominated for the Billy Brown Award -Best Emerging Artist 2019

The Japanese premiere of the production opened at the Theatre Creation in Tokyo from September 2–19, 2012, and toured to theatres in Niigata, Oita, Osaka and Fukuoka where it closed on October 3, 2012. The production returned to the Theatre Creation on January 5–9, 2013. Caird's book and Gordon's lyrics were translated into Japanese by Maoko Imai. The Japanese productions starred Sakamoto Maaya as Jerusha and Inoue Yoshio as Jervis.

The Korean premiere of the production opened at the Daemyung Culture Factory in Seoul from July 19, 2016, and closed on October 3, 2016. Caird's book and Gordon's lyrics were translated into Korean by Lee Heejun and directed by Nell Balaban. The Korean productions are multi-cast, with 2 Jerushas and 3 Jervises. It starred Lee Jisook and Yuria as Jerusha and Shin Sungrok, Song Wongeun, and Kang Dongho as Jervis.

The Canadian premiere of the production, starring McGinnis and Hancock, opened at the Royal Manitoba Theatre Centre Mainstage in Winnipeg, from March 14 until April 6, 2013.

Music Theatre International (MTI) currently holds the worldwide licensing rights to the musical. The university premiere of the show was at the University of Maryland, Baltimore County on December 2 and 3, 2017.

The Russian premiere of the production made into Dear Mr. Smith opened at the Theatre "Shelter of Comedians" in Saint Petersburg June 4–6, 2021. Caird's book and Gordon's lyrics were translated into Russian Maria Kuznetsova and directed by Aleksey Frandetti. The Russian productions starring Yulia Dyakina, Jerusha, and Ivan Ozhogin, Jervis. From May 11 to June 17, 2020, the musical play staged with same artists on the Instagram and same director, following the events of the novel into the 21st century.

== Plot Synopsis ==
Note: While relatively retaining elements from Webster's book, some details have been changed, added, or removed (e.g.: In the book, Jerusha changes her name to Judy, whereas in the stage musical, she does not). The current synopsis reflects the current Off-Broadway production.

=== Act One ===
In an orphanage called the John Grier Home, Jerusha Abbott calls the first Monday of every month a "perfectly awful day" due to orphanage's trustees' monthly visit and how she bears the load of the preparations. After the visit, Mrs. Lippett, the home's matron, calls for Jerusha in her office. On her way there, she glimpses one of the Trustee's long, spindly, and spidery shadow cast by the headlights of his awaiting car ("The Oldest Orphan in the John Grier Home"). Mrs. Lippett hands her a letter from the Trustee she just saw leaving the home. Impressed by her amusing satirical essays about life at the orphanage, he devised a nine-point plan for her further education. The Trustee will be sending her to a local college with all expenses paid, with the intention that she educate herself to become a writer. The only condition is that Jerusha must write to him reporting her progress and impressions of the college, and that he will remain anonymous, only to be addressed as "Mr. Smith". Her letters will never be answered, nor take the slightest attention to them ("Who Is This Man?"). Jerusha arrives at the college, and begins to pen her first letter. She complains regarding her benefactor's alias: "Why couldn't you have picked out a name with a little personality?" After musing over what she'll call her mysterious benefactor, she finally decides on "Daddy Long Legs" due to his tall figure and she imagining him to be old and gray ("Mr. Girl Hater"). In his study in Manhattan, young philanthropist Jervis Pendleton, Jerusha's benefactor, is amused and puzzled over her first letter ("She Thinks I'm Old").

Jerusha writes about her lessons from her freshman year classes ("Freshman Year Studies"), and describes her anxiety over trying to fit in with the other girls at her college due to her upbringing in an orphanage ("Like Other Girls"). She then writes about her embarrassment at her lack of education and her excitement about learning ("Things I Didn't Know"). During the Christmas vacation, Jerusha stays behind in the college to catch up on her reading, and sends her love to Daddy Long Legs in her loneliness. The shy and awkward Jervis finds her affection-filled letters disconcerting ("What Does She Mean By Love?"). Jerusha flunks two of her first exams and is mortified. She becomes ill and writes angrily to Daddy Long Legs, accusing him of not caring for her and simply supporting her merely out of charity. Moved by this, Jervis sends her a bouquet of flowers, and Jerusha is penitent ("I'm A Beast").

Enthralled by her letters, Jervis arranges to meet his young beneficiary, under the pretence that he is meeting his niece Julia, who happens to be Jerusha's least favorite friend ("When Shall We Meet?"). After meeting Jervis, Jerusha is immediately drawn to him: "He's a real human being, not a Pendleton after all ... he looked at me as if he really knew me, almost better than I know myself." Despite this, Jerusha becomes more and more curious regarding her old and gray Daddy Long Legs ("The Color of Your Eyes").

The summer arrives, and Jerusha begs Daddy Long Legs not to send her back to the John Grier Home, as she has nowhere to go to. Jervis, adopting another guise as a "secretary" to Mr. Smith, sends her to Lock Willow Farm, where she explores her talent as a writer. Jerusha then proclaims that she finally knows what the secret of happiness is, and that is to live in the now ("The Secret of Happiness"). She also stumbles upon a connection between Jervis Pendleton and Lock Willow Farm, yet doesn't connect this information to her Daddy Long Legs. Jerusha expresses her longing to finally see her Daddy Long Legs, while Jervis becomes increasingly frustrated on whether he should reveal himself as her benefactor or not, realizing he is falling in love with her ("The Color of Your Eyes (Reprise)").

=== Act Two ===
Upon returning to the college for her sophomore year, Jerusha continues her studies and her writing, as well as become socially involved with the family of her friend Sallie McBride ("Sophomore Year Studies"). Jervis, upon reading of Jerusha's attachment to Sallie's attractive brother Jimmy, realizes that he is already falling for her. He then invites Jerusha, Julia, and Sallie for a long cultural weekend ("My Manhattan"). The summer arrives again, and Jerusha asks for permission to spend her vacation at the McBrides' country home on the Adirondacks. Jervis, through his secretarial alias, insists that she spend the summer at Lock Willow Farm instead due to his fear of Jerusha falling in love with Jimmy. Feeling alone and trapped, Jerusha writes an angry letter in response to his domineering nature and finds it hard to forgive Mr. Smith ("I Couldn't Know Someone Less").

Jervis struggles to finally reveal himself to Jerusha as her Daddy Long Legs and subsequently confess his feelings. He thinks that Jerusha will never forgive him if he comes clean regarding his true identity ("The Man I'll Never Be"). Jervis visits Jerusha in Lock Willow, the farm where he grew up as a boy. The couple enjoy the countryside together and find themselves growing more and more attached to one another ("The Secret of Happiness (Reprise)"). Jerusha receives an invitation from Sallie to join her family at Camp McBride, and another from Jervis to meet him at Lock Willow. Despite Mr. Smith's warnings, Jerusha proceeds to Camp McBride due to some negative remarks she received from Jervis when he found out she turned down an invitation to Paris from Julia, to work as a teacher in French and algebra to support herself. Jervis then contemplates his controlling nature, both as Jervis and as Mr. Smith ("Humble Pie"). After four years, Jerusha completes her studies and invites Mr. Smith to her graduation ceremony to finally meet him. Jervis does attend the ceremony as Julia's guest, but does not reveal himself to the bitterly disappointed Jerusha ("Graduation Day"). Back in his Manhattan study, Jervis reflects on the concept of charity and its effects on both the benefactor and the beneficiary, and how Jerusha became a recurring character in his life ("Charity").

In Lock Willow, Jerusha writes to Mr. Smith that she will never think of him again after his no-show at her graduation ceremony ("I Have Torn You From My Heart"). After a few months, she writes that her first novel has been accepted by a publisher, and enclosed a check of $1000 as a first installment of her repayment of her college fees. She then tells him that she will continue to repay her debt to him, and all future royalties will proceed to the John Grier Home, making her a trustee and therefore, meeting him at last. Jervis is overwhelmed by this gesture and overjoyed at her success as a writer ("My Manhattan (Reprise)").

Jervis visits Jerusha in Lock Willow to ask her hand in marriage. Unable to tell him of her origins, she turns him down, thinking that he and his family might feel indifferent towards her when she does tell him. In her final letter, Jerusha declares her love for Jervis, and appeals for a personal meeting with Mr. Smith. Jervis, writing as Mr. Smith, agrees to meet her.

Jerusha finally arrives at their meeting place, and is surprised to see Jervis, whom she initially and skeptically assumes to be Mr. Smith's secretary. Jervis finally reveals to her that he is Mr. Smith or Daddy Long Legs. Distressed over this revelation, as well as realising that he has read her private letters about him, Jerusha accuses him of playing with her feelings and the mere fact that he didn't even write back over the course of four years, which Jervis acquiesces to ("I'm A Beast (Reprise)"). At last, he declares his love for Jerusha, which she reciprocates. Jerusha finally understands the grand scheme of things that led her to where she is now ("All This Time").

== Characters ==
- Jerusha Abbott - The "Oldest Orphan in the John Grier Home". She is selected by Jervis Pendleton, under the alias "John Smith", to be educated in a local women's college under the instruction that she must send him a letter once a month, which he will never answer. She gives Pendleton the nickname "Daddy Long Legs" due to his tall shadow.
- Jervis Pendleton - A shy and socially awkward philanthropist. Under the guise of Mr. John Smith (nicknamed "Daddy Long Legs" by Jerusha), he provides for Jerusha's college education due to her promising writing skills and ends up falling in love with her.

== Musical numbers ==
Act 1

- "The Oldest Orphan in the John Grier Home" - Jerusha
- "Who Is This Man?" - Jerusha
- "Mr. Girl Hater" - Jerusha, Jervis
- "She Thinks I'm Old" - Jervis
- "Like Other Girls" - Jerusha, Jervis
- "Freshman Year Studies" - Jerusha, Jervis
- "Things I Didn't Know" - Jerusha, Jervis
- "What Does She Mean By Love?" - Jervis
- "I'm a Beast" - Jerusha
- "When Shall We Meet?" - Jervis
- "The Color of Your Eyes" - Jerusha, Jervis
- "The Secret of Happiness" - Jerusha, Jervis
- "The Color of Your Eyes" (Reprise) - Jerusha, Jervis

Act 2

- "Sophomore Year Studies"* - Jerusha, Jervis
- "My Manhattan"# - Jervis
- "I Couldn't Know Someone Less" - Jerusha
- "The Man I'll Never Be" - Jervis
- "The Secret of Happiness (Reprise)" - Jervis, Jerusha
- "Humble Pie" - Jervis
- "Graduation Day"# - Jerusha, Jervis
- "Charity" - Jervis
- "I Have Torn You From My Heart" - Jerusha
- "My Manhattan (Reprise)"* - Jervis
- "I'm A Beast (Reprise)" - Jervis
- "All This Time" - Jerusha, Jervis

*Not present in any of the recordings

#Present in any of the recordings but in a different form (different melody and/or lyrics)

- In the Original Cast and Japanese recordings, "Girl in the Window Display" was a duet by Jerusha and Jervis and was the predecessor to "My Manhattan"

== Casts ==
Character	World Premiere Rubicon Theatre Company, 2009	Original West End Cast St. James Theatre, 2012	Original Off-Broadway Cast Davenport Theatre, 2015	Live Streamed / Closing Off-Broadway Cast
Jerusha Abbott	Megan McGinnis	Megan McGinnis	Megan McGinnis	Megan McGinnis
Jervis Pendleton	Robert Adelman Hancock	Robert Adelman Hancock	Paul Alexander Nolan	Adam Halpin

Off-Broadway understudies

- Jerusha Abbott - Hannah Corneau, Ephie Aardema
- Jervis Pendleton - Will Reynolds

== Reviews ==
The show received positive reviews. According to the aggregator Show-Score, the show received a score of 81%, combining both scores from professional critics and audience reviews. The performers, especially McGinnis, received praise for their performances. However, critics are divided on the show itself, most faulting the epistolary approach to the libretto.

Alexis Soloski, reviewing the Off-Broadway production for The New York Times, found that Gordon's music and lyrics "have a charm and ease, though the songs can blur into one another in ways that are sometimes purposeful and sometimes not" and Caird's book "appealing" and direction "nimble." She wrote of McGinnis having a "bright spirit, a mass of curly hair and a dulcet soprano" and of Nolan being "softly debonair" and possesses a "tender tenor that nicely encircles Ms. McGinnis's voice in their duets."

Steven Suskin, reviewing the Off-Broadway production for The Huffington Post, found that the "letter-by-letter format inevitably leads to too many similar sections," yet found the musical "imaginative" and Caird's two-actor scheme "economical," in contrast with his "ponderously overdone" work for Jane Eyre (another collaboration between him and Gordon). He wrote of McGinnis to be charming, despite the "baldly expository opening number ('The Oldest Orphan in the John Grier Home')" and of Nolan to be "sweetly sympathetic here as he was harshly disruptive in Zhivago."

== Recordings ==
The original cast recording, featuring McGinnis and Hancock, was released by Paul Gordon Music on February 1, 2010. The Japanese cast recording, featuring Sakamoto and Inoue, was released on June 18, 2014, by Toho Music and included 26 tracks in the Japanese language, translated by Maoko Imai. The original Off-Broadway cast recording, featuring McGinnis and Nolan, was released by Ghostlight Records on November 13 (US digital release), November 20 (international digital release), and December 18, 2015 (CD release).

Demo recordings of the songs from the musical were recorded in 2004 and 2005, with Jayne Paterson and Paul Gordon performing.

== Awards and nominations ==
Year	Award Ceremony	Category	Nominee	Result	Ref
2010	Ovation Awards	Best Production of a Musical (Large Theater)	Rubicon Theatre Company	Nominated	
2010	Ovation Awards	Lead Actress in a Musical	Megan McGinnis	Won	
2010	Ovation Awards	Director of a Musical	John Caird	Nominated	
2010	Ovation Awards	Book for an Original Musical	John Caird	Won	
2010	Ovation Awards	Lyrics/Music for an Original Musical	Paul Gordon	Won	
2010	Ovation Awards	Scenic Design (Large Theater)	David Farley	Nominated	
2010	Ovation Awards	Sound Design (Large Theater)	Jonathan Burke	Nominated	
2016	Drama Desk Award	Outstanding Musical		Nominated	
2016	Drama Desk Award	Outstanding Book of a Musical	John Caird	Won	
2016	Outer Critics Circle Award	Outstanding New Off-Broadway Musical		Nominated	
2016	Outer Critics Circle Award	Outstanding Book of a Musical	John Caird	Nominated	
2016	Outer Critics Circle Award	Outstanding New Score	Paul Gordon	Nominated	
2016	Off-Broadway Alliance Awards	Best New Musical		Nominated	
