= The News (musical) =

1985 Broadway musical

- Playbill cover from original Broadway run
- Music: Paul Schierhorn
- Lyrics: Paul Schierhorn
- Book: Paul Schierhorn; R. Vincent Park; David Rotenberg
- Premiere: November 7, 1985: Helen Hayes Theatre

The News is a rock musical with music and lyrics by Paul Schierhorn. It tells the story of the editor of a lurid tabloid newspaper and a serial killer whose actions the paper reports on.

After tryouts in Florida and Connecticut, The News premiered on Broadway on November 7, 1985. It received extremely negative reviews and closed after just four performances. A 1986 production in London received a better response.

== Synopsis ==
None of the story's characters are named. They are referred to only by generic titles such as 'Girl' and 'Executive Editor'.

The stage is divided into three parts, with the newsroom in the center, Girl's bedroom on one side, and Killer's apartment on the other. The action takes place mostly in the newsroom of The Mirror, a fictional tabloid in an unnamed large city.

Executive Editor tries to drive readership with sensational reporting and outrageous headlines, such as "Head Red Dead", and "Live Goat Found in Madonna's Stomach". He is an inattentive father to a 15-year-old, Girl, speaking to her only over the phone.

Girl makes a connection with a mysterious man, Killer, through a series of personal ads ("Classifieds/Personals"). She makes an off-handed remark to Killer that someone should kill all the unethical figures who work in the media. Killer takes Girl's remark to heart and resolves to go on a killing spree ("Shooting Stars").

The staff at The Mirror are excited to cover the subsequent spate of murders. They hold a contest inviting readers to name the serial killer.

In a climax which commentators have described as "confusing", and "unbelievable", Killer and Girl meet in person, with Killer ultimately "blow[ing] himself away".

== Development ==
Paul Schierhorn wrote the music and lyrics for The News. The book was written by Schierhorn, R. Vincent Park and David Rotenberg, who also directed. The three had little or no experience on Broadway. Schierhorn and Rotenberg had met while studying at the Yale School of Drama.

In an interview with The Globe and Mail before opening night, Rotenberg described the venture as a "gamble", with close to one million dollars invested in the show, and acknowledged that if reviews were bad, they might have to close the following day.

== Productions ==
The show went through tryouts at the Burt Reynolds Jupiter Theatre in Jupiter, Florida. It later played for two weeks at the Westport Country Playhouse in Westport, Connecticut, starting September 24. The show began previews at the Helen Hayes Theatre on Broadway on October 18, 1985, opening on November 7 and closing on November 9. In all, the show played 22 previews and 4 performances on Broadway.

A year after its Broadway failure, another production was staged in London with a new cast, most notably Richard O'Brien as Killer. The show opened on September 18, 1986, at the Paramount City theatre (formerly known as the Windmill Theatre, known for its nude revues), and ran for approximately one month. Patrons were seated at tables and drinks were served, creating a "theatre club atmosphere".

In 2002, Tulane University Theatre (where Schierhorn was then teaching in the drama department) staged what they described as the first American production of The News in 17 years. Schierhorn co-directed the production with choreographer Beverly Trask.

=== Original Broadway cast ===
The following are the members of the original Broadway cast (in alphabetical order, as they appeared in the show's programme):

- Cheryl Alexander – Reporter
- Frank Baier – Circulation Editor
- Jeff Conaway – Executive Editor
- Anthony Crivello – Killer
- Michael Duff – City Editor
- Jonathan S. Gerber – Feature Editor
- Anthony Hoylen – Talk Show Host
- Patrick Jude – Reporter
- Lisa Michaelis – Girl (daughter of Executive Editor)
- Charles Pistone – Reporter
- John Rinehimer – Sports Editor
- Peter Valentine – Style Editor
- Billy Ward – Managing Editor

== Reception ==
Critical reception of The News was overwhelmingly negative. In The New York Times, Frank Rich wrote that "every minute of The News, as it happens, is agony". Writing for the Associated Press, Michael Kuchwara called the show "ludicrous and distasteful". Writing for New York magazine, John Simon described it as "a monstrosity so noxious and nauseating, so sophomoric and witless, so pretentious and pointless, and, above all, so loud, that past horrors seem to beckon from the oubliettes of memory".

Critics disparaged virtually every aspect of the show. The set design was criticized as "unattractive" and "dingy", with Rich writing that the newsroom had been "inexplicably designed to resemble a sushi bar". Costumes were derided as cheap and ugly. Many reviewers found the plot confusing. The music was described as too loud and "aggressively screechy". Reviews were also critical of the cast, with Michaelis' portrayal of Executive Editor's 15-year-old daughter widely considered inept. Simon wrote that she looks "30 and appalling". Some faint praise was given to Crivello's portrayal of Killer, with Simon writing that he "at least tries for a genuine performance", and Kuchwara calling his song "Shooting Stars" the best of the evening. Some reviewers speculated that the show had combined its two acts into one after previews to prevent the audience from escaping during intermission.

The News was nominated for Best Original Score at the 40th Tony Awards. The New York Times noted that the nominees were the only four productions eligible in the category that year.

=== London production ===
The London production received a positive review in The Times. Andrew Rissik wrote that the show combined two clichés (a cynical view of tabloid journalism, and a melodramatic story of "loneliness and broken dreams") into an "invigorating and enjoyable" product. He praised Richard O'Brien's performance as Killer, writing that he "held the evening together" with his sinister stage presence.
