= Paul Gordon (composer) =

American songwriter

- Birth name: Paul Howard Gordon
- Occupations: Musical theatre writer; songwriter
- Years active: 1970s–present
- Website: paulgordonmusic.com

Paul Howard Gordon is an American composer of popular songs and music for the theatre.

== Career ==
Gordon composed the music and lyrics for the stage musical Jane Eyre which ran on Broadway in 2000–2001, for which he received a nomination for the Tony Award for Best Original Score. The musical was later produced by TheatreWorks at the Mountain View Center for the Performing Arts in Mountain View, California, in 2003. Of this production, the talkinbroadway.com reviewer wrote: "The music of Paul Gordon fits this production like a glove, with unbroken strings of music and lyrics that give the audience the mood of the story." The Wall Street Journal noted the musical has "a lyrical score".

His musical Emma played an engagement at the Old Globe Theatre (San Diego, California) in 2011.

The stage musical The Front, for which Gordon wrote the music and lyrics with Jay Gruska, had a reading at the Manhattan Theatre Club in April 2007, and private industry readings in 2008.

He composed the music and lyrics for the stage musical Daddy Long Legs with the book and direction by John Caird, which premiered at the Rubicon Theatre Company, Ventura, California in October 2009 and then had an engagement with TheatreWorks at the Mountain View Center for the Performing Arts from January through February 2010.

In progress is a musical entitled Little Miss Scrooge, which had a workshop production at the Rubicon Theatre in 2013.

A concert of Gordon's music played at Joe's Pub (New York City) in 2007, and featured his works from stage musicals performed by Marla Schaffel, Brian d'Arcy James and others.

Gordon has written popular songs, including the no. 1 songs "The Next Time I Fall" recorded by Peter Cetera and Amy Grant, and "Friends and Lovers", which was no. 1 on both pop and country charts. He has also written for films (including Ghostbusters II) and television.

As of 2019 Gordon's new musical adaptation of Jane Austen's Pride and Prejudice will receive its world premiere in December 2019 presented by TheatreWorks (Silicon Valley) at the Lucie Stern Theatre in Palo Alto, California.

In 2023 Gordon's musical The Gospel According to Heather debuted off-Broadway at Theater 555 in New York City. The show was directed by Rachel Klein, produced by Amas Musical Theatre and Jim Kierstead and featured Katey Sagal.

== Musical scores ==
- Greetings from Venice Beach (1993)
- Jane Eyre (1995)
- Emma (2006)
- The Front; music also by Jay Gruska
- Daddy Long Legs (2009)
- Sense & Sensibility (2015)
- Pride & Prejudice (2018)
- The Gospel According to Heather (2024)
- Juliet and Romeo (2025)

== Awards and nominations ==
Tony Awards

- 2001: Nominated for Best Original Score for the original Broadway production of Jane Eyre, which was also nominated for Best Musical.

Bay Area Critics Circle Awards

- 2007: Won the San Francisco Bay Area Theatre Critics Circle Award for Original Script for Emma at TheatreWorks

Ovation Awards

- 2010: Won the award for Lyrics/Music for an Original Musical for the Rubicon Theatre Company production of Daddy Long Legs

Jeff Awards

- 2015: Won the award for New Work—Musical for Sense and Sensibility at the Chicago Shakespeare Theater
