= Jane Eyre (musical) =

- Original Cast Recording
- Music: Paul Gordon
- Lyrics: Paul Gordon
- Book: John Caird
- Basis: Jane Eyre by Charlotte Brontë
- Productions: 1995 Wichita, Kansas; 1995 Toronto; 1999 La Jolla Playhouse; 2000 Broadway; 2009 Tokyo; 2012 Tokyo; 2023 Tokyo; 2023 Brno; 2026 Manhattan Concert Production; 2026 Off-West End Premiere

Jane Eyre is a musical drama with music and lyrics by composer-lyricist Paul Gordon and a book by John Caird, based on the 1847 novel by Charlotte Brontë. The musical premiered on Broadway in 2000.

On February 15th, 2026, the musical was part of the Manhattan Concert Production Broadway Series at Lincoln Center’s David Geffen Hall starring Erika Henningsen and Ramin Karimloo.

30 years on since the original production, the musical will make its UK premiere at London's Southwark Playhouse on 28th August 2026. It will be directed by John Caird.

== Production history ==
A workshop of the musical was performed at Manhattan Theatre Club in 1995. The musical had a work-in-progress workshop production in Wichita, Kansas in Autumn 1995 at the Centre Theatre. Minor roles and the large ensemble of schoolgirls for the scenes at Brocklehurst's school were cast locally, while the directors brought several members of the principal cast from New York. The musical was well received, and a recording of this rendition allowed the creative team and their backers to slowly move the project towards an opening on Broadway. The musical had its world premiere at the Royal Alexandra Theatre in Toronto, Ontario, Canada in late 1996. The musical then had a pre-Broadway try-out at La Jolla Playhouse, San Diego, California, July 14, 1999 to August 29, 1999. The cast had been reduced from 30 in Toronto to 19.

The musical debuted on Broadway at the Brooks Atkinson Theatre on November 9, 2000, with an official opening on December 10, 2000 and closed on June 10, 2001 after 36 previews and 209 performances. Marla Schaffel, who played the title character, won a Drama Desk Award and the Outer Critics Circle Award (in a tie with Christine Ebersole) for her performance. The production was directed by John Caird and Scott Schwartz, choreography by Jayne Paterson, set designer by John Napier, costumes by Andreane Neofitou, and lighting by Jules Fisher and Peggy Eisenhauer. Days after the Tony Award nominations were announced, a closing date of May 20 was announced. Alanis Morissette, a friend of Paul Gordon's, bought $150,000 worth of tickets to the musical and donated them to various charity groups. This would allow the show to be open past the Tony Award telecast, although the show closed a week after.

Years later in 2018, it was announced a new version of the musical would have its world premiere at Cleveland Musical Theatre, directed by Miles Sternfeld. The new production would feature a 10-person cast, instead of the original 21, as well as new songs written by Gordon. Every actor in the ensemble (except Jane and Rochester) would play multiple roles throughout the course of the show. The production opened in late August to rave reviews. Cool Cleveland stated in their review: "Jane Eyre in its new form and format is a musical that shows that a "small" production, in which care is taken with directing, casting and technical aspects, can make musical theater more captivating than big, splashy, overproduced shows".

The 2023 Tokyo production was recorded for Blu-ray release.

John Caird and Paul Gordon's 2000 musical version of Jane Eyre will get a long-awaited UK debut at Southwark Playhouse, Elephant later in 2026, directed by Megan McGinnis, with performances running August 28 - October 24. Opening night will be September 8. News of this production also comes just after the launch of a new chamber revision of the musical with theatrical licensor Music Theatre International. Having premiered in 2024 at North Carolina's Theatre Raleigh with a smaller orchestration, reduced casting needs, and changes to the lyrics and book, this edition will likely serve as the basis for the upcoming UK premiere at the 310-seat venue.

== Characters and original cast ==
| Character | Wichita (1995) | Toronto (1996) | La Jolla Playhouse (1999) | Broadway (2000) | London (2026) |
|---|---|---|---|---|---|
| Jane Eyre | Marla Schaffel | Marla Schaffel | Marla Schaffel | Marla Schaffel | Charlie Burn |
| Edward Fairfax Rochester | Anthony Crivello | Anthony Crivello | James Barbour | James Barbour | Ashley Gilmour |
| Mrs. Fairfax / Marigold | Martha Hawley | Mary Stout | Mary Stout | Mary Stout | Gemma Page |
| Blanche Ingram | Nicole Dooley | Elizabeth DeGrazia | Elizabeth DeGrazia | Elizabeth DeGrazia | Eve Shanu-Wilson |
| Young Jane Eyre | Jennifer Bedore / Taryn Southern | Sara Farb | Tiffany Scarritt | Lisa Musser | Poppy Jason / Emily-Rose Samuel |
| Adèle Varens | Ashley Sinclair | Frannie Diggins/Sharai-Ann Ross-Laney | Joelle Shapiro | Andrea Bowen | Poppy Jason / Emily-Rose Samuel |
| St. John Rivers | Chad Frisque | Aloysius Gigl | Christopher Yates | Stephen R. Buntrock | Melad Hamidi |
| Helen Burns | Angela Lockett | Angela Lockett | Megan Drew | Jayne Paterson | Isabelle Methven |
| Robert | —N/a | Bruce Dow | Bruce Dow | Bruce Dow | Connor Wood |
| Richard Mason | Charles Parker | Bill Nolte | Bill Nolte | Bill Nolte | Jonathan Andrew Hume |
| Bertha Mason | Heather Ayers | Gina Ferrall | Marguerite MacIntyre | Marguerite MacIntyre | Hannah Lindsey |
| Miss Scatcherd | Martha Hawley | Gina Ferrall | Marguerite MacIntyre | Marguerite MacIntyre | Hannah Lindsey |
| Mrs. Dent | Heather Ayers | Nell Balaban | Marguerite MacIntyre | Marguerite MacIntyre | N/A |
| Colonel Dent | Don Richard | Don Richard | Don Richard | Don Richard | N/A |
| Mr. Brocklehurst | Don Richard | Don Richard | Don Richard | Don Richard | Jonathan Andrew Hume |
| Mrs. Reed | Charlene Ayers | Brooks Almy | Anne Allgood | Gina Ferrall | Gemma Page |
| Lady Ingram | Charlene Ayers | Beth Anne Cole | Anne Allgood | Gina Ferrall | Hannah Lindsey |
| Grace Poole | Charlene Ayers | Brooks Almy | Nell Balaban | Nell Balaban | Claire Greenway |
| Amy Eshton | Tracy Gardner | Kelli Rabke | Nell Balaban | Nell Balaban | N/A |
| Mr. Eshton | Paul Jackson | Mark E. Smith | Christopher Yates | Stephen R. Buntrock | N/A |
| Louisa Eshton | Angela Lockett | Angela Lockett | Rachel Ulanet | Gina Lamparella | N/A |
| Mary Ingram | Mary Jeanette Warlick | Lavonda Elam | Jayne Paterson | Jayne Paterson | Izzi Levine |
| Vicar | Chad Frisque | Kevin McGuire | Don Richard | Don Richard | Connor Wood |
| Young John Reed | Ryan Bogner | Peter McCutcheon | Lee Zarrett | Lee Zarrett | Connor Wood |
| Young Lord Ingram | Charles Parker | Aloysius Gigl | Lee Zarrett | Lee Zarrett | N/A |
| Jane's Father | Anthony Crivello | Anthony Crivello | Christopher Yates | N/A | Melad Hamidi |
| Jane's Mother | Heather Ayers | Jayne Paterson | Jayne Paterson | N/A | Izzi Levine |
| Miss Temple | Heather Ayers | Nell Balaban | N/A | N/A | N/A |

== Musical numbers ==
Act I

- Jane — Edward Fairfax Rochester
- The Orphan — Jane Eyre ^
- Children of God — Schoolgirls, Mr. Brocklehurst, Mrs. Reed, Miss Scatcherd and Ensemble ^
- Forgiveness — Helen Burns, Young Jane and Jane Eyre ^
- The Death of Helen Burns — Helen Burns, Young Jane, Ensemble
- The Graveyard — Jane Eyre, Young Jane and Ensemble ^
- Sweet Liberty — Jane Eyre and Ensemble ^
- Secrets of the House — Ensemble ^
- Perfectly Nice — Mrs. Fairfax, Adèle and Jane Eyre ^
- The Icy Lane — Ensemble
- The Master Returns — Mrs. Fairfax, Robert
- Captive Bird — Edward Fairfax Rochester
- As Good As You — Edward Fairfax Rochester ^
- You're Word to God — Edward Fairfax Rochester
- The Fire — Bertha Mason, Ensemble
- After the Fire — Edward Fairfax Rochester
- Secret Soul — Jane Eyre and Edward Fairfax Rochester ^
- Society's Best — Mrs. Fairfax
- Galloping Up to the Drive — The Guests
- The Finer Things — Blanche Ingram ^
- Oh How You Look In The Light — Edward Fairfax Rochester, Blanche Ingram and Ensemble
- The Pledge — Jane Eyre and Edward Fairfax Rochester ^
- Sirens — Edward Fairfax Rochester, Jane Eyre and Bertha ^

Act II

- Things Beyond This Earth — Ensemble ^
- The Scream — Richard Mason, Bertha Mason, Edward Fairfax Rochester, Ensemble
- Painting Her Portrait — Jane Eyre ^
- In The Light Of The Virgin Morning — Jane Eyre and Blanche Ingram^
- The Gypsy — Marje Bubrosa ^
- The Proposal — Jane Eyre and Edward Fairfax Rochester ^
- The Chestnut Tree — Grace Poole, Servants 1 + 2
- Slip of a Girl — Mrs. Fairfax, Jane Eyre, Robert and Adèle ^
- The Wedding — Ensemble
- Wild Boy — Edward Fairfax Rochester, Jane Eyre, Bertha and Ensemble
- Sirens (Reprise) — Jane Eyre and Edward Fairfax Rochester ^
- Farewell Good Angel — Edward Fairfax Rochester ^
- Rain — Woman, Ensemble ^
- The Death of Mrs. Reed — Mrs. Reed, Jane Eyre and Ensemble
- The Voice Across The Moors — St. John Rivers, Jane Eyre and Edward Fairfax Rochester ^
- Poor Sister — Richard Mason and Jane Eyre ^
- Brave Enough For Love — Jane Eyre, Edward Fairfax Rochester and Ensemble ^

^ = songs on the soundtrack ----- Poor Master on the soundtrack is sung by Richard Mason, so it's slightly different.---- Before the song "Rain", on the CD, a cut song from the show "My Maker" is sung by Jane.

== Synopsis ==
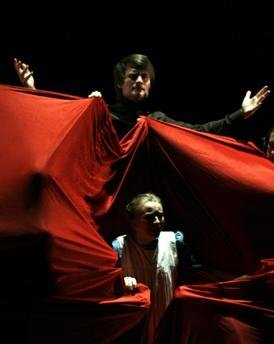
Mr Reed torments young Jane in Suffolk Youth Theatre's 2008 production

Act 1

Jane Eyre, a young orphan, is living at Gateshead but is ill-treated by her Aunt Mrs. Reed and cousin John Reed. Jane is sent to a boarding school. Over the years, Jane becomes a teacher at the boarding school but longs to see other sights. She becomes a tutor of Adèle Varens, a young French girl who lives at Thornfield Hall as the ward of the owner, Edward Rochester. When a fire breaks out, Jane puts it out and saves Edward's life, and the two become close. Edward, however, cannot accept his affection for Jane, and so invites wealthy guests as a distraction. It appears that Blanche Ingram and Edward may be getting married, and Jane is unhappy over this.

Mason, an old friend, arrives, and Edward is disturbed. He asks Jane whether she would leave if he had a terrible secret, and she vows her faithfulness.

Act 2

When Mason is attacked in the attic, he is helped by Jane and Edward and leaves.

Edward, pretending to be a gypsy, tells Blanche Ingram that he is not rich, and she hastily departs Thornfield. Edward at last tells Jane that he loves her and proposes marriage, and Jane happily accepts. However, on the day of the wedding, Mason tells the secret. Edward is already married to Bertha (who is Mason's sister) and his mad wife lives in the attic of Thornfield. Jane, unwilling to live with Edward without being married, leaves. Bertha meanwhile sets fire to Thornfield, and dies in the flames.

Jane, hungry and exhausted after wandering the moors, has returned to Gateshead Hall, and discovers that her aged aunt is near death. Mrs. Reed has tried to steal her inheritance, but Jane forgives this last evil treatment. St. John Rivers, a clergyman, proposes marriage and Jane almost accepts. But, she hears Edward calling out to her. She returns to Thornfield to see that it has been destroyed. Jane and Edward, blind and crippled in the attempt to save his wife, are married. Edward's sight is partially restored as Jane shows him their new-born son.

== Comparison between the book and musical ==
According to Variety, "Most of the novel's unforgettable Gothic incidents are here: the orphaned Jane's cruel treatment at the hands of her aunt and her spoiled, sadistic cousin; further humiliation at the Lowood school, where she is befriended by the angelic Helen Burns, who then departs --- lickety-split --- to join her immortal brethren; and, of course, Jane's great, doomed romance with her employer Edward Fairfax Rochester (James Barbour), dark of brow and gloomy of spirit, but sexy as hell."

The New York Times reviewer wrote that "The overall gallop through Bronte's significant plot has the teasing quality of a movie trailer. We barely see Bertha when she sneaks down from the attic to set Rochester's bed aflame."

In the book, Jane's aunt left her nothing when she died. It was Jane's uncle, whom we never meet, that made her rich.

In the book, Jane does not return to Gateshead Hall after leaving Edward but is found by St. John Rivers, who then helps her get a teaching position.

The character of Miss Temple, the caring teacher at the Lowood Institution, was cut from the stage musical in between its productions in Toronto and La Jolla.

== Response ==
The Talkin Broadway reviewer wrote: "A successful dramatic interpretation of the ever-popular novel by Charlotte Bronte, Jane is also blessed with a luxuriant score, haunting and memorable music, and crisp, intelligent lyrics which speak from the very heart of this tragic and romantic story. John Caird, who wrote the book, and Paul Gordon, who wrote the music and lyrics, have come up with a major contender come Spring's award time...With Jane Eyre, Marla Schaffel joins that small group of great stars of the American musical theatre - Angela Lansbury, Julie Andrews, and Bernadette Peters - who, lady-like to the core, can effortlessly carry a major musical on their delicate shoulders and enchant an audience with a smile."

Bruce Weber reviewing for The New York Times wrote "With such an opulence of imagery and emotion to work with, so much history and psychodrama to forage in, it is no surprise that the novel has attracted adapters for the screen and stage. But even with a dignified, assured performance by Marla Schaffel in the title role, the gloomy and mundane musical version of Jane Eyre that opened yesterday on Broadway at the Brooks Atkinson Theater captures few of the richly available nuances."

== Awards and nominations ==
=== Original Broadway production ===
| Year | Award Ceremony | Category | Nominee | Result |
|---|---|---|---|---|
| 2001 | Tony Award | Best Musical | | Nominated |
| 2001 | Tony Award | Best Book of a Musical | John Caird | Nominated |
| 2001 | Tony Award | Best Original Score | Paul Gordon | Nominated |
| 2001 | Tony Award | Best Performance by a Leading Actress in a Musical | Marla Schaffel | Nominated |
| 2001 | Tony Award | Best Lighting Design | Jules Fisher and Peggy Eisenhauer | Nominated |
| 2001 | Drama Desk Award | Outstanding Actress in a Musical | Marla Schaffel | Won |
