= Nissay Theatre =

Theater in Chiyoda Ward, Tokyo, Japan

Coordinates: 35.673153°N 139.758425°E

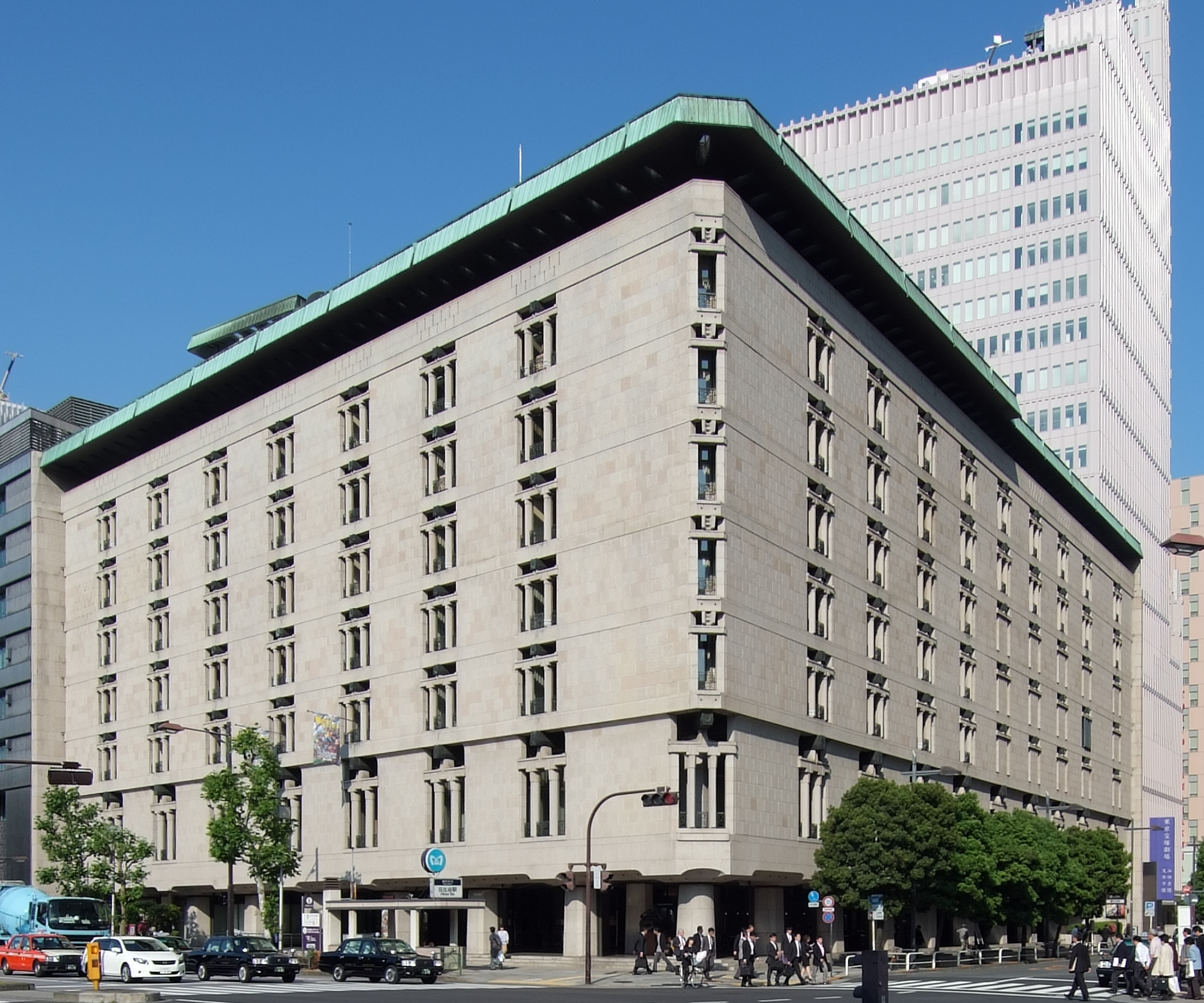
- Interactive map of Nissay Theatre
- Location: 1-1-1 Yūrakuchō, Chiyoda, Tokyo
- Owner: Nissay Culture Foundation
- Seating type: Reserved
- Capacity: 1,330
- Type: Indoor theatre

Construction
- Groundbreaking: 1960
- Built: 1961
- Opened: 1963

Website
- https://www.nissaytheatre.or.jp/

The Nissay Theatre (日生劇場, Nissei Gekijō) is a theatre in Chiyoda, Tokyo, Japan. It is located in the Nissay Hibiya Building, designed by the architect Togo Murano. It was constructed for the 70th anniversary of Nippon Life, a leading insurance company.

The theatre was completed in 1963 and opened with the Japanese premiere of Beethoven's opera Fidelio by the Deutsche Oper Berlin. Since then, a wide variety of performing arts shows have been staged at the theatre, including kabuki, operas, musicals, and family programs. In the field of opera, there are light or comic opera performed at the Nissay, like Mozart's The Marriage of Figaro, Rossini's The Barber of Seville, Donizetti's La fille du régiment or Johann Strauss' Die Fledermaus − mostly with Japanese cast. In the field od tragic operas, the Nissay performs mostly the classic operas like Lucia di Lammermoor, Macbeth, La traviata or the Puccini operas. From time to time there are also operas from the 20th century and contemporary operas on the programs — such as Henze's Gogo no eiko, based on the novel by Yukio Mishima, or Ainadamar by Osvaldo Golijov.

Inside the 1,330-seat theatre, the walls and ceilings are curved and there are no straight lines. The ceiling is decorated with 20,000 pearl oyster shells.

For many years, until the company acquired its first permanent theater, it staged numerous productions by the Shiki Theatre Company.
