= Marla Schaffel =

American actress

- Born: Orlando, Florida
- Education: Juilliard School (BFA)
- Occupation: actress
- Years active: 1991–present
- Family: Dani Schaffel (sister)

Marla Schaffel is an American actress, especially in musical theatre, noted for her award winning performance in the title role in the musical adaptation of Jane Eyre.

== Personal life ==
Schaffel was raised in Miami, Florida, and attended Miami Palmetto High School. She attended the Juilliard School's drama division, as a member of Group 19 (1986–1990), where her classmates included Jeanne Tripplehorn and Laura Linney. She then attended the Moscow Art Theatre School and was featured at the first Soviet International Theatre Festival. She graduated from Juilliard in 1990.

== Career ==
Schaffel's first major acting job was in 1991 with the original Broadway production of Les Misérables, as a swing and understudying the role of Fantine. She performed opposite Natalie Toro (as Eponine) and J. Mark McVey (as Valjean). She left the theatre after turning down the coveted role of Christine Daaé in Andrew Lloyd Webber's The Phantom of the Opera. She had a small role in the television series Kung Fu: The Legend Continues, as Tyler Smith, Peter Caine's girlfriend in season 1.

In 1995, she won over several competitors for the title role in the Manhattan Theatre Club workshop of Jane Eyre - The Musical. She was featured alongside Anthony Crivello as Edward Rochester and Mary Stout as Mrs. Fairfax. Later that year, she was featured in the world première of the musical, starring these two as well, in Wichita, Kansas at the Center for Arts. In 1996, the musical had its Canadian premiere at The Royal Alexandra Theatre in Toronto. The show released a cast recording.

In 1995, she starred in the title role of Evita, as part of the national tour in order to promote the film. In 1997, she starred as Maria in West Side Story at the Westchester Broadway Theatre in New York.

She starred in Julie Davis' first film I Love You, Don't Touch Me!, which premiered at the Sundance Film Festival in 1997.

She played her second Broadway role in Titanic, as a replacement for the role of Caroline Neville, from April 14, 1998 until March 28, 1999.

Following Titanic, Jane Eyre received its Broadway try-out at the La Jolla Playhouse in San Diego from July to September 1999. Schaffel was cast once more as Jane, with former castmates Mary Stout, Elizabeth DeGrazia and Don Richard; joining as Rochester was James Stacy Barbour. Jane Eyre opened on Broadway at the Brooks Atkinson Theatre on December 10, 2000. The show received mixed notices, several of which claimed Marla was too pretty to play a "Plain Jane". The show announced a closing for May 20, but Alanis Morissette (a Canadian herself, as was the composer and many of the cast including DeGrazia) supported the show to last out through the Tony Awards, for which was nominated as Best Leading Actress. Jane Eyre closed on June 10, 2001.

Before Jane Eyre opened on Broadway, she originated and created the role of Judith in the play Glimmerglass at the Goodspeed Opera House for the world première in 1999.

Schaffel appeared in the York Theatre Company's production of Enter Laughing as Angela. The show opened in January 2009 and closed in March.

Schaffel has been Artist-in-Residence at The Mirror Theater Ltd’s GAAR in Greensboro, Vermont since 2012 and has performed in numerous productions to universally positive reviews. In 2005, Schaffel made a brief appearance on season 6 of NBC’s “Law and Order SVU.” She was credited as “Girl,” in episode 20 named “Night.”

== Awards and nominations ==
Awards

- 2001 - Drama Desk Award for Outstanding Actress in a Musical – Jane Eyre
- 2001 - Outer Critics Circle Award for Best Actress in a Musical – Jane Eyre

Nominations

- 2001 - Tony Award for Best Actress in a Musical – Jane Eyre
- 2002 - Leon Rabin Award for Outstanding Performance by a Leading Actress – My Fair Lady (Dallas Production)
