= A Class Act =

Musical

- Original Logo
- Music: Edward Kleban
- Lyrics: Edward Kleban
- Book: Linda Kline; Lonny Price
- Basis: The life of Edward Kleban
- Productions: 2000 Off-Broadway; 2001 Broadway

A Class Act is a quasi-autobiographical musical loosely based on the life of composer-lyricist Edward Kleban, who died at the age of 48 in 1987. Featuring a book by Linda Kline and Lonny Price along with music and lyrics by Kleban himself, the musical uses flashbacks and the device of time running backwards to retrace the high and low points of the composer's personal and professional life.

The original production concept was haphazardly thrown together by Kleban's close friend and author of the book by using a trunkful of songs that Kleban had written for a number of unproduced musicals, and writing new scenes or reworking original scenes around them, with Price polishing up the results.

In addition to serving as a tribute to one of the award-winning collaborators of A Chorus Line, A Class Act provides another behind-the-scenes glimpse at how a musical is created and brought to the stage. In contrast to A Chorus Line, the piece offers a more severe warning about how an artist's personal life—including struggles with mental illness and cancer—can interfere with, obstruct, and eventually doom his professional and personal pursuits.

== Productions ==
The musical was initially produced Off-Broadway by the Manhattan Theatre Club at Stage II, opening on October 3, 2000 and running through December 10, 2000.

Director Lonny Price cast himself as the lead in the Off-Broadway production, and the cast was rounded out by Randy Graff as Sophie, Jonathan Freeman as Lehman Engel, Carolee Carmello as Lucy, Ray Wills as both Charlie and Marvin Hamlisch, Julia Murney as Felicia, Nancy Anderson as Mona, and David Hibbard as both Bobby and Michael Bennett.

A Class Act transferred to Broadway on March 11, 2001 at the Ambassador Theatre, where it ran for 30 previews and 105 regular performances. Price, Graff, Hibbard, and Anderson were retained from the Off-Broadway company, with Patrick Quinn replacing Freeman, Donna Bullock replacing Carmello, Jeff Blumenkrantz replacing Wills, and Sara Ramirez replacing Murney.

=== Canadian premiere ===
A Class Act had its Canadian premiere presented by the Toronto Civic Light Opera Company as the company's 30th anniversary production in May 2009. The show starred Joe Cascone (Ed Kleban), Caroline Moro-Dalicandro (Sophie), David Haines (doubling as Bobby and Marvin Hamlisch), Joanne Kennedy (Lucy), Eric Botosan (Lehman Engel), Julie Lennick (Felicia), Stephanie Douglas (Mona) and Larry Gibbs (doubling as Charley and Michael Bennett).

Like the original New York productions, the Toronto production was directed by its leading player, Joe Cascone, with choreography by Lesley Ansell and musical direction by Paul Christman. This production dropped the song "Don't Do It Again".

== Plot ==
In 1988, a memorial service to Ed Kleban is being held at the Shubert Theatre. Ed appears at his own memorial. His friends and colleagues remember him and think back over the past. As the time shifts backwards, the friends reminisce about the songwriting workshop held by Lehman Engel (now known as the BMI Lehman Engel Musical Theater Workshop). As Ed interacts with the people in his life, he deals with ambitions, success, failures, and loves.

== Characters ==
- Ed – Edward Kleban, lyricist and composer
- Sophie – Ed's oldest friend and first love, an oncologist
- Lehman Engel – head of the songwriting workshop
- Michael Bennett – director/ choreographer of A Chorus Line
- Marvin Hamlisch – composer of A Chorus Line
- Lucy – Ed's last significant other, member of the BMI Workshop
- Felicia – Ed's boss at Columbia Records, member of the BMI Workshop
- Bobby – Ed's best friend, member of the BMI Workshop
- Charlie – a friend from the workshop, member of the BMI Workshop
- Mona – one of Ed's many love affairs, member of the BMI Workshop

== Song list ==
Act I

- "Light on My Feet" – Ed and Company
- "The Fountain in the Garden" – Company
- "One More Beautiful Song" – Ed and Sophie
- "Fridays at Four" – Company
- "Bobby's Song" – Bobby
- "Charm Song" – Lehman and Company
- "Paris Through The Window" – Ed, Bobby and Charley
- "Mona" – Mona
- "Under Separate Cover" – Sophie, Lucy and Ed
- "Don't Do It Again" – Felicia and Ed
- "Gauguin's Shoes" – Ed and Company
- "Don't Do It Again (Reprise)" – Lehman
- "Follow Your Star" – Sophie and Ed

Act II

- "Better" – Ed and Company
- "Scintillating Sophie" – Ed
- "The Next Best Thing To Love" – Sophie
- "Broadway Boogie Woogie" – Lucy
- "Better (Reprise)" – Ed and Company
- "I Choose You" – Ed and Lucy
- "The Nightmare" – Ed
- "Say Something Funny" – Company
- "When the Dawn Breaks" – Ed
- "Self Portrait" – Ed

== Recording ==
A recording by the Off-Broadway cast was released by RCA Victor Broadway on February 20, 2001.

== Critical reception ==
The New York Times reviewer wrote of the Broadway production that it "... seems smaller in almost every respect, and perhaps more curiously it is a better and more satisfying show, one that has found its rightful dimensions. ...The choreography could be more lively and original .... overall the show's alteration in spirit carries the day."

The CurtainUp.com reviewer of the Manhattan Theatre Club production wrote: "It also left me filled with admiration for the eight talented performers who deserve a standing ovation for turning this small musical into a big treat for the eye, the ear and the heart. ...The entire song cycle has the flavor of the traditional musical esthetic. The music is tuneful and bouncy (often danceable). The lyrics full of clever lines."

== Awards and nominations ==
=== Original Broadway production ===
Year	Award Ceremony	Category	Nominee	Result
2001	Drama Desk Award	Outstanding Featured Actress in a Musical	Randy Graff	Nominated
2001	Drama Desk Award	Outstanding Lyrics	Edward Kleban	Nominated
2001	Drama Desk Award	Outstanding Music	Edward Kleban	Nominated
2001	Tony Award	Best Musical		Nominated
2001	Tony Award	Best Book of a Musical	Linda Kline and Lonny Price	Nominated
2001	Tony Award	Best Original Score	Edward Kleban	Nominated
2001	Tony Award	Best Performance by a Leading Actress in a Musical	Randy Graff	Nominated
2001	Tony Award	Best Orchestrations	Larry Hochman	Nominated
