= Russell Thomas =

American operatic tenor

Russell Thomas (born 1976/1977) is an American operatic tenor. He has performed leading roles at some of the world's leading opera houses, including the Metropolitan Opera, Los Angeles Opera, Lyric Opera of Chicago, the English National Opera, Deutsche Oper Berlin, and the Royal Opera House, Covent Garden, among others.

== Early life ==
Born in Miami, Florida, Thomas did not discover his voice until the age of 18, when a voice teacher suggested he could make a career out of singing. He went on to study music at conservatory, and sang in the chorus of Miami Opera as an undergraduate. Thomas went on to be a young artist with Seattle Opera Young Artist Program, the Florida Grand Opera, the Opera Theatre of Saint Louis, and Sarasota Opera.

== Career ==
In 2008 Thomas moved to Atlanta, Georgia. In 2014 he was made Atlanta Symphony Orchestra's first Artist-In-Residence.

He has sung the role of Tito in Mozart's La clemenza di Tito and Rodolfo in Puccini's La Boheme at the Metropolitan Opera, and at the Royal Opera House, Covent Garden he appeared as Gabriele Adorno in Verdi's Simon Boccanegra. He performed the role of Canio in a 2021 online video of Ruggero Leoncavallo's Pagliacci, produced by Lyric Opera of Chicago (LOC). He later performed the role live with the LOC in 2025. At the same opera house he performed as Florestan in Beethoven's Fidelio in 2024.

He was the Artist in Residence for the Los Angeles Opera until 2024.

== Personal life ==
Thomas is an openly gay man who became a father through adoption.
