= Randy Graff =

American actress (born 1955)

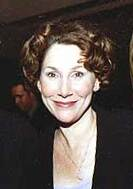
- Graff in 2004
- Born: May 23, 1955 (age 71); New York City, U.S.
- Education: Wagner College
- Occupations: Actress, singer
- Awards: Tony Award for Best Featured Actress in a Musical; Tony Award for Best Actress in a Musical
- Website: Randygraff.com

Randy Graff (born May 23, 1955) is an American actress and singer known for her work in Drexell's Class and Les Misérables.

== Early years ==
Born in Brooklyn, New York on May 23, 1955, Graff was part of a musically oriented family. Her grandmother "was the lead soprano in temple", and her uncle sang with, and arranged for, vocal groups of the swing era. She graduated from Port Richmond High School and Wagner College.

== Career ==
Graff's professional debut occurred at the Village Dinner Theater in Raleigh, North Carolina, in 1976. She has been in feature films such as Keys to Tulsa and Rent as well as being in television shows such as NBC's Law & Order a number of times. In addition to film and television, Graff has been in several Broadway shows.

In 1990 Graff won a Tony Award and a Drama Desk Award for her work in City of Angels, and in 2001 she was nominated for a Tony Award for her performance in A Class Act.

She originated the role of Fantine in the musical Les Misérables when the production opened on Broadway in 1987, which included "I Dreamed a Dream", also on the soundtrack released in 1990.

While Graff points out that she was the first person to sing "I Dreamed a Dream" in the U.S., this discounts a performance by Patti LuPone, who sang it on The Joan Rivers Show shortly before the musical opened in New York. She has also appeared in Broadway revivals of the musicals Damn Yankees and Fiddler on the Roof.

Graff teaches at the Manhattan School of Music.

== Filmography ==
- Working It Out: "Pilot" (1990) TV Episode – Andy #1
- Law & Order
  - "Sonata for Solo Organ" (1991) TV Episode – Dr. Martha Kershan
  - "Attorney Client" (2002) TV Episode – Hillary Morton
  - "Publish and Perish" (2005) TV Episode – Helen DeVries
- Drexell's Class (1991) TV Series – Principal Francine E. Itkin
- Mad About You: "Bedfellows" (1993) TV Episode – Sharon, Paul's older sister
- Bless This House: "Pilot" (1995) TV Episode – Marion
- Keys to Tulsa (1997) – Louise Brinkman
- Ed: "The Stars Align" (2001) TV Episode – Attorney
- Rent (2005) - Mrs. Cohen
- Learning to Drive (2014) – Attorney

== Theatre ==
Broadway

- Grease (1972)
- Saravá (1979)
- Les Misérables (1987) – Original Broadway cast
- City of Angels (1989) – Original Broadway cast, Tony Award winner for Best Featured Actress in a Musical
- Falsettos (1992)
- Laughter on the 23rd Floor (1993)
- Moon Over Buffalo (1995)
- High Society (1998)
- A Class Act (2001) – Original Broadway cast, Tony Awards nominee for Best Actress in a Musical
- Fiddler on the Roof (2004) – Revival
- Mr. Saturday Night (2022)

Off-Broadway

- A... My Name Is Alice (1983 and 1984)
- Do Re Mi (1999) Encores!, New York City – Kay Cram
- Hotel Suite (2000) – Millie
- A Class Act (2000) – Sophie
- Damn Yankees (2008) – Revival
- The Babylon Line (2016–2017) Lincoln Center Newhouse Theater – Frieda Cohen; Lucille Lortel Award for Featured Actress

Regional

- A Little Night Music (2002) – "Charlotte", Kennedy Center for the Performing Arts, Washington, DC
- Elegies: A Song Cycle (2006) – "Reprise! Broadway's Best "Marvelous Musical Mondays", Los Angeles, California
- Hello, Dolly! (2007) – "Dolly", The Muny, St. Louis, Missouri
- Broadway: Three Generations (2008) – Kennedy Center for the Performing Arts, Washington, DC
- Damn Yankees (2008) – The New York City Center
- Motherhood Out Loud (2009) – Bay Street Theatre, Sag Harbor, New York
