= Fort Collins Lincoln Center =

Arts center in Fort Collins, Colorado

Coordinates: 40°34′56.56″N 105°4′58.97″W

Situated in the heart of Fort Collins, The Lincoln Center is the premier multi-venue performing and visual arts center in Northern Colorado. It was founded in 1978 through a community initiative called “Designing Tomorrow Today” that resulted in a voter-approved $2.2 million capital improvements tax, with the community raising an additional $300,000 to complete a new performing and visual arts center for Fort Collins.

Today, The Lincoln Center is one of Colorado's largest and most diverse presenters of professional theatre, dance, music, comedy, visual arts, and children's programs. It is the largest Northern Colorado presenter of nationally touring performances including Broadway musicals and big-name acts. In addition, its community partners such as OpenStage Theatre, Canyon Concert Ballet, Larimer Chorale, The Fort Collins Symphony and Debut Theater help make The Lincoln Center a frequent gathering place for families and arts and culture lovers alike.

Following an $8.4 million renovation in 2010, The Lincoln Center is refreshed, renewed and remarkable. The renovation and expansion focused on improving the patron experience, performer amenities, and infusing new life into this community treasure. Community members throughout Northern Colorado have been flocking to see the “new” Lincoln Center, which now features elegant and expanded lobbies, a new rooftop deck, several new and inviting bar spaces, a beautiful new art gallery and a start-of-the-art sound system.

== Facilities and uses ==
=== Performance Hall ===
The Lincoln Center's Performance Hall is the venue of choice for large productions; ranging from fully staged theatrical performances to major meetings and presentations.

The Performance Hall is a proscenium theatre with ample production and support space and top-of-the-line audience amenities. This 1,187-seat theatre features large private dressing rooms as well as a spacious lobby with a built-in bar for pre and post-event gatherings.

The Performance Hall is used for productions by the Fort Collins Symphony Orchestra, as well as for plays and other musical performances. Notable visitors to the Performance Hall include U2, Ray Charles, Randy Newman, Jeff Dunham, STOMP, The Producers, Hairspray and many more. The Performance Hall features a hydraulic orchestra pit that can be lowered for use by an orchestra or for use as a service elevator.

=== Magnolia Theatre ===
Fully equipped with lighting, sound and projection systems, The Lincoln Center's Magnolia Theatre is appropriate for a wide range of performances, seminars, convention activities or special events. It is primarily used by local groups, children's and youth theater productions, community theater companies and business lectures and presentations.

The Magnolia Theatre is a proscenium theatre with ample production and support space and top of the line audience amenities. The Magnolia Theatre features large private dressing rooms as well as a spacious lobby for with a built-in bar for pre and post-event gatherings.

=== Canyon West Ballroom ===
The Canyon West Ballroom is the largest indoor event venue at The Lincoln Center. With over 5,000 square feet of space, it is ideal for weddings and receptions, large business meetings, conferences and special events.

This elegant ballroom features six chandeliers, coffered ceilings, beautiful wood accents and earth tone carpeting. The Canyon West Ballroom is fully equipped with dramatic lighting and built-in professional sound and presentation systems. Easy access to the attached kitchen makes Canyon West ideal for catered events.

=== Columbine Room ===
The Lincoln Center's Columbine Room is the second largest event rental facility, with just over 2,700 square feet of space. The Columbine Room provides an excellent indoor space for meetings, classes, small receptions and special events.

The Columbine Room is decorated in warm earth tones providing a modern and professional setting. This room includes a built-in sound system and projection screen to accommodate any audio visual needs, as well as built-in adjustable lighting. Easy access to Fort Collins Lincoln Center's kitchen makes catered events practical and convenient.

=== Rooftop deck ===
The rooftop deck at The Lincoln Center is a unique outdoor venue, ideal for parties, wedding ceremonies, wedding receptions or any number of special events. Located on the second floor, just outside the balcony lobby, this 2,400 square foot open-air space is situated among the tree tops and overlooks the entrance plaza.

The rooftop deck is accessible by the grand staircase or handicapped accessible by elevator. This sophisticated event space features stone pavers, treetop views in the daylight, sparkling Tivoli lights at night and a built-in bar located just inside the lobby.

=== Terrace ===
The Lincoln Center's Terrace is a spacious outdoor venue, with over 2,800 square feet, perfect for receptions, luncheons or musical events. Surrounded by trees, garden greenery and a beautiful fountain, the Terrace offers a quaint and ideal setting for an outdoor event.

Located just outside The Lincoln Center's main level, the Terrace provides the beauty of the outdoors with the convenience of indoor amenities nearby for you and your guests. The Terrace is completely paved for easy set-up and has electrical outlets for sound and lighting systems.

=== Founders Room ===
This elegant and intimate reception room is located right off The Lincoln Center's main lobby, next to the Performance Hall. The Founders Room is the perfect space to host a pre or post performance reception, banquet or any event requiring an inviting and personal setting.

The Founders Room features warm neutral colors and elegant décor that creates a unique and appealing atmosphere for you and your guests. This space also offers a discreet catering area with a sink and prep station.

=== Art Gallery ===
The Lincoln Center's Art Gallery is the main exhibit gallery, hosting approximately nine to twelve events annually. Fine art exhibitions can create an exciting and provocative setting for a special event. The Art Gallery is a unique space for intimate receptions, small gatherings or cocktail parties.

Because the care and preservation of the art is its first consideration, food and beverage is generally not permitted in the gallery. Other areas in the building may provide an alternative space for food, beverages and additional space for people to gather.

Exhibits change on a regular basis, and the particular installation will determine the number of people the gallery will hold at any given time. This space is available on a limited basis in accordance with gallery exhibits and performance schedules.

== Performing Arts Season ==
The Lincoln Center presents shows as LC LIVE. These shows are scheduled as part of The Lincoln Center's performing arts season, which typically runs September–May. LC LIVE presents a variety of programming including professional theatre, dance, music, comedy and family-friendly programs. LC LIVE curated series include Showstoppers, National Geographic Live, Laugh Riot, Anything Goes, Dance, Classical Convergence and Imagination.
