= Megan McGinnis =

American stage actress

- Born: December 5, 1979 (age 46); Pasadena, California
- Education: Columbia University (BA)
- Occupation: Actress/Singer
- Years active: 1998–present
- Spouse: Adam Halpin

Megan McGinnis (born December 5, 1979) is an American Broadway actress, who performed in the role of Éponine, in the revival of Les Misérables. She created the role of Jerusha Abbott in the Off-Broadway production of Daddy Long Legs. She also played Belle in Beauty and the Beast on Broadway and created the role of Beth March in Little Women.

== Broadway career ==
McGinnis made her Broadway debut in The Diary of Anne Frank as Margot Frank, in 1998. She had her next big role in The Sound of Music on the national tour as Liesl. She returned to Broadway in 2002 to play the role of Lucille in Thoroughly Modern Millie, and was also a member of the ensemble.

McGinnis break-out role was Belle in Disney's Beauty and the Beast, which she played from April 15, 2003, to February 10, 2004. She was replaced by Christy Carlson Romano

McGinnis' next big project was the musical Little Women, in which she played the role of Beth from workshops to Broadway. Following Little Women, McGinnis began understudying the role of Éponine in the revival of Les Misérables under Celia Keenan-Bolger and Mandy Bruno. Even though Bruno was the lead in this role, McGinnis often played Éponine, as Bruno was involved in a television soap-opera. After Bruno left, McGinnis took over the role of Éponine regularly from June 23, 2007 – January 6, 2008.

From 2009 to 2016, McGinnis created the role of Jerusha Abbott in the musical adaptation of Daddy Long Legs, based on the 1912 novel of the same name in various Regional tryouts before running Off Broadway from 2015 to 2016. During her time with the show Off Broadway, she performed alongside her husband Adam Halpin as Jervis Pendleton when the show made history as the first Broadway show ever to be livestreamed while the show was running. She now plays Barbara in Beetlejuice on Broadway.

== Personal life ==
McGinnis attended Columbia University, graduating with a Bachelor of Arts in English.

== Theatre Credits ==
- Trojan Women
- The Sound of Music, Liesl, US Tour
- Annie
- 1940's Radio Hour
- Babes in Toyland
- The Diary of Anne Frank, Miep Gies (u/s)/Margot Frank (u/s), Broadway, 1998
- Parade, Ensemble/Assistant (u/s)/Essie (u/s)/Iola Stover (u/s)/Lizzie Phagan (u/s)/Monteen (u/s)/Monteeni (u/s)/Nurse (u/s)/Ensemble (u/s), Broadway, 1998
- The Dead, Lily, US Tour
- The Robber Bridegroom, workshop
- Beauty and the Beast, Belle (replacement), Broadway
- Thoroughly Modern Millie, Lucille/Miss Dorothy Brown (u/s) (replacement), Broadway, 2003–04
- Little Mary Sunshine, Ensemble, reading, 2003
- Good Vibrations, Performer, workshop, 2004
- Dangerous Beauty, Performer, workshop, 2005
- Little Women, Beth March/Rodrigo Two, Broadway, 2005
- Triangle, Performer, reading, 2006
- Les Misérables, Female worker/whore/Éponine (u/s), Broadway, 2006–07
- Les Misérables, Éponine, Broadway, 2007–08
- Daddy Long Legs, Jerusha Abbott, West End, 2012
- Side Show, Daisy Hilton (s/b)/Violet Hilton (s/b), Broadway, 2014–15
- Daddy Long Legs, Jerusha Abbott, off-Broadway, 2015
- Come from Away, Bonnie and others, National tour, 2018
- Beetlejuice, Barbara Maitland (replacement), National tour, 2023

== Awards and nominations ==
Ovation Awards

- 2010: Won the award for Lead Actress in a Musical for the role of Jerusha in the Rubicon Theatre Company production of "Daddy Long Legs"
