= 81st Academy Awards =

- Official poster
- Date: February 22, 2009
- Site: Kodak Theatre; Hollywood, Los Angeles, California, United States
- Hosted by: Hugh Jackman
- Preshow hosts: Jess Cagle; Tim Gunn; Robin Roberts
- Produced by: Bill Condon; Laurence Mark
- Directed by: Roger Goodman

Highlights
- Best Picture: Slumdog Millionaire
- Most awards: Slumdog Millionaire (8)
- Most nominations: The Curious Case of Benjamin Button (13)

TV in the United States
- Network: ABC
- Duration: 3 hours, 30 minutes
- Ratings: 36.94 million 20.88% (Nielsen ratings)

The 81st Academy Awards ceremony, presented by the Academy of Motion Picture Arts and Sciences (AMPAS), honored the best films of 2008 and took place on February 22, 2009, at the Kodak Theatre in Hollywood, Los Angeles, beginning at 5:30 p.m. PST / 8:30 p.m. EST. During the ceremony, the Academy of Motion Picture Arts and Sciences presented Academy Awards (commonly referred to as Oscars) in 24 categories. The ceremony was televised in the United States by ABC, and was produced by Bill Condon and Laurence Mark and directed by Roger Goodman. Hugh Jackman hosted the show for the first time. Two weeks earlier in a ceremony at the Beverly Wilshire Hotel in Beverly Hills, California held on February 7, the Academy Awards for Technical Achievement were presented by host Jessica Biel.

Slumdog Millionaire won eight awards, including Best Picture. Other winners included The Curious Case of Benjamin Button with three awards, The Dark Knight and Milk with two, and Departures, The Duchess, La Maison en Petits Cubes, Man on Wire, The Reader, Smile Pinki, Toyland, Vicky Cristina Barcelona, and WALL-E with one. The telecast garnered almost 37 million viewers in the United States.

== Winners and nominees ==
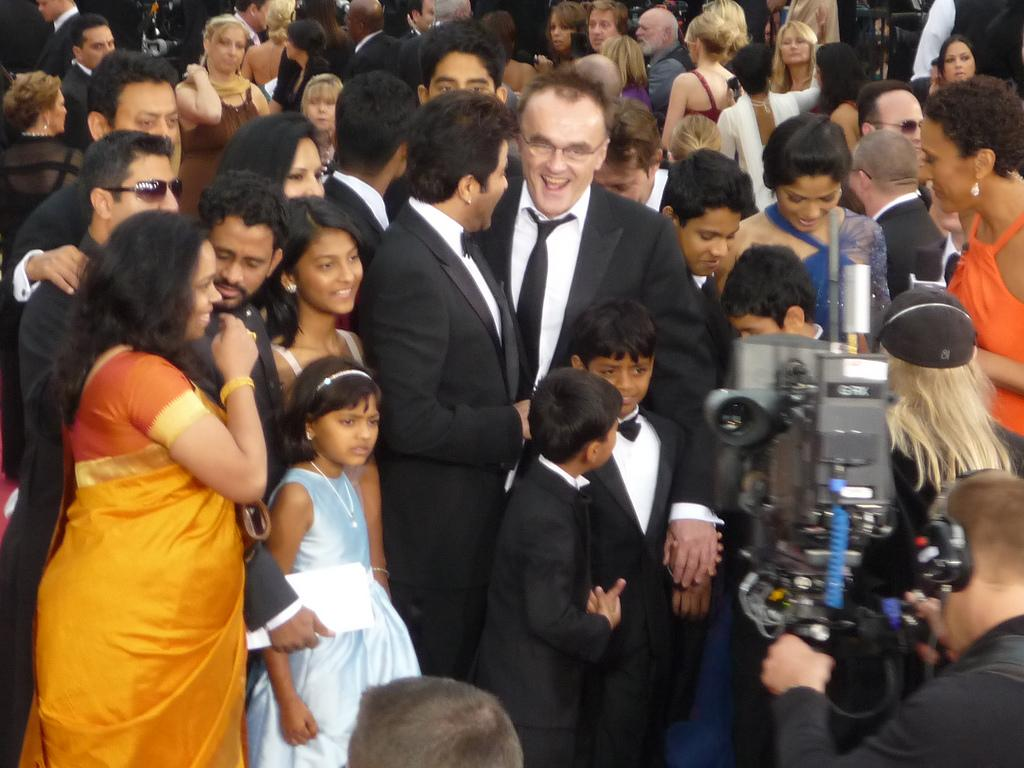
The Slumdog Millionaire team at the 81st Academy Awards

The nominees for the 81st Academy Awards were announced on January 22, 2009, at 5:38 p.m. PST (13:38 UTC) at the Samuel Goldwyn Theater in Beverly Hills, California, by Sid Ganis, president of the Academy, and the actor Forest Whitaker. The Curious Case of Benjamin Button received the most nominations with thirteen (the ninth film to garner that many nominations); Slumdog Millionaire came in second with ten. This would be the fifth year that all five Best Picture nominees were also nominated for Best Director; it would also be the last due to the Academy extending the number of Best Picture nominees from five to ten for the following ceremonies.

The winners were announced during the awards ceremony on February 22, 2009. Slumdog Millionaire was the eleventh film to win Best Picture without any acting nominations. Sean Penn became the ninth person to win Best Lead Actor twice. Best Supporting Actor winner Heath Ledger became the second performer to win a posthumous acting Oscar. The first actor to receive this distinction was Peter Finch, who posthumously won Best Actor for Network two months after his death in January 1977. Coincidentally, both actors were the first native Australians to win Oscars in their respective categories. With its six nominations, WALL•E tied with 1991's Beauty and the Beast as the most nominated animated film in Oscar history.

=== Awards ===
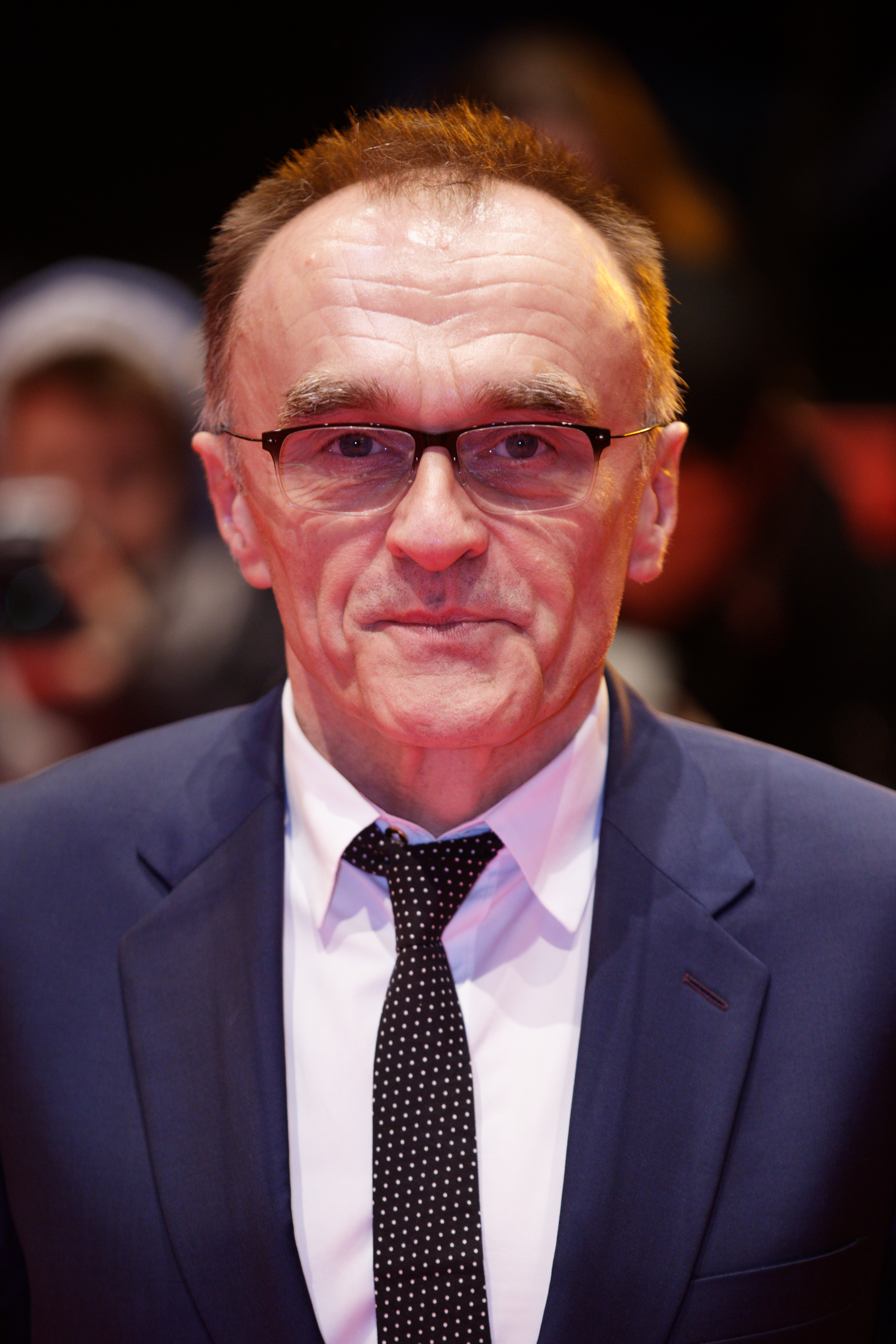
Danny Boyle, Best Director winner

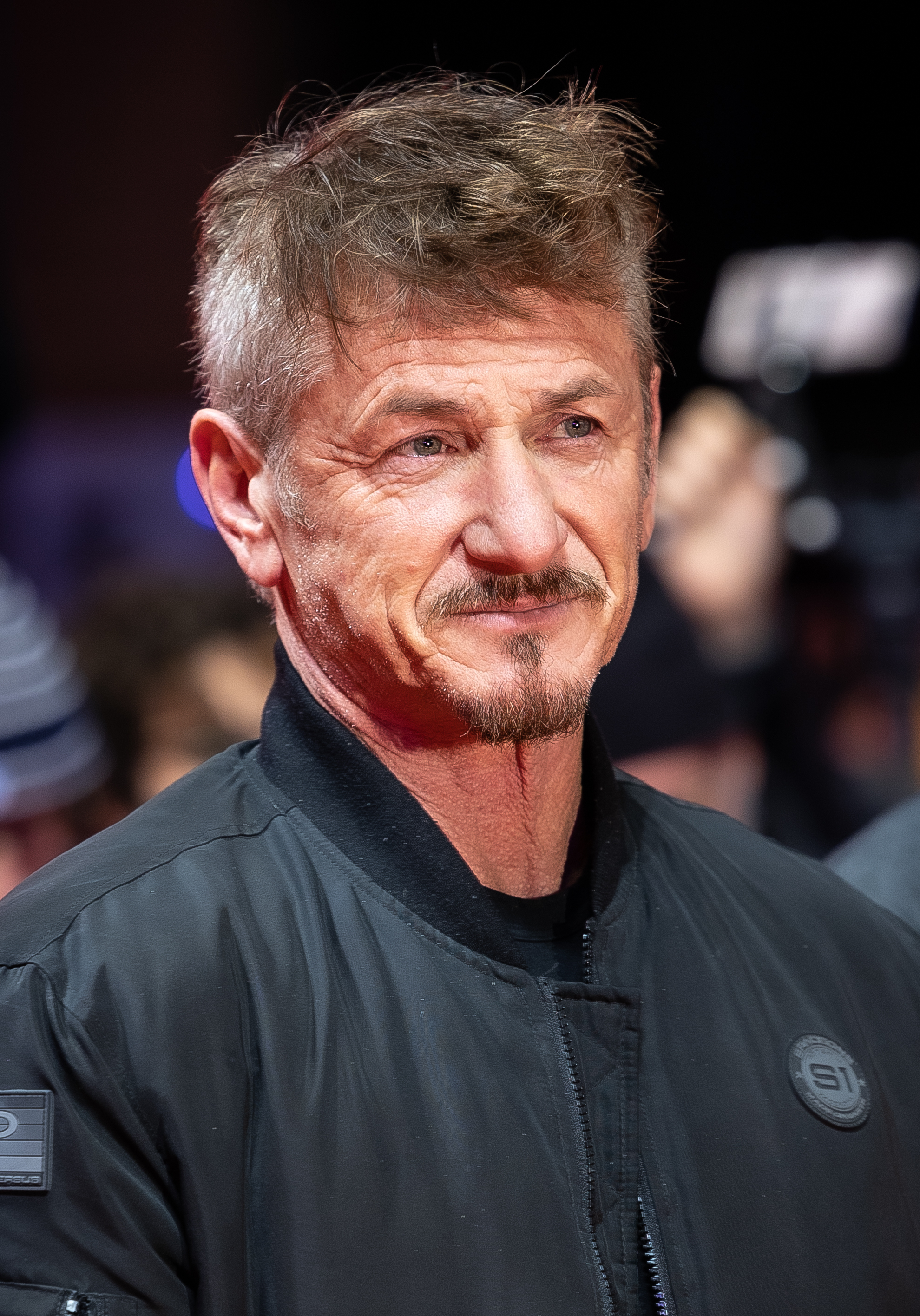
Sean Penn, Best Actor winner

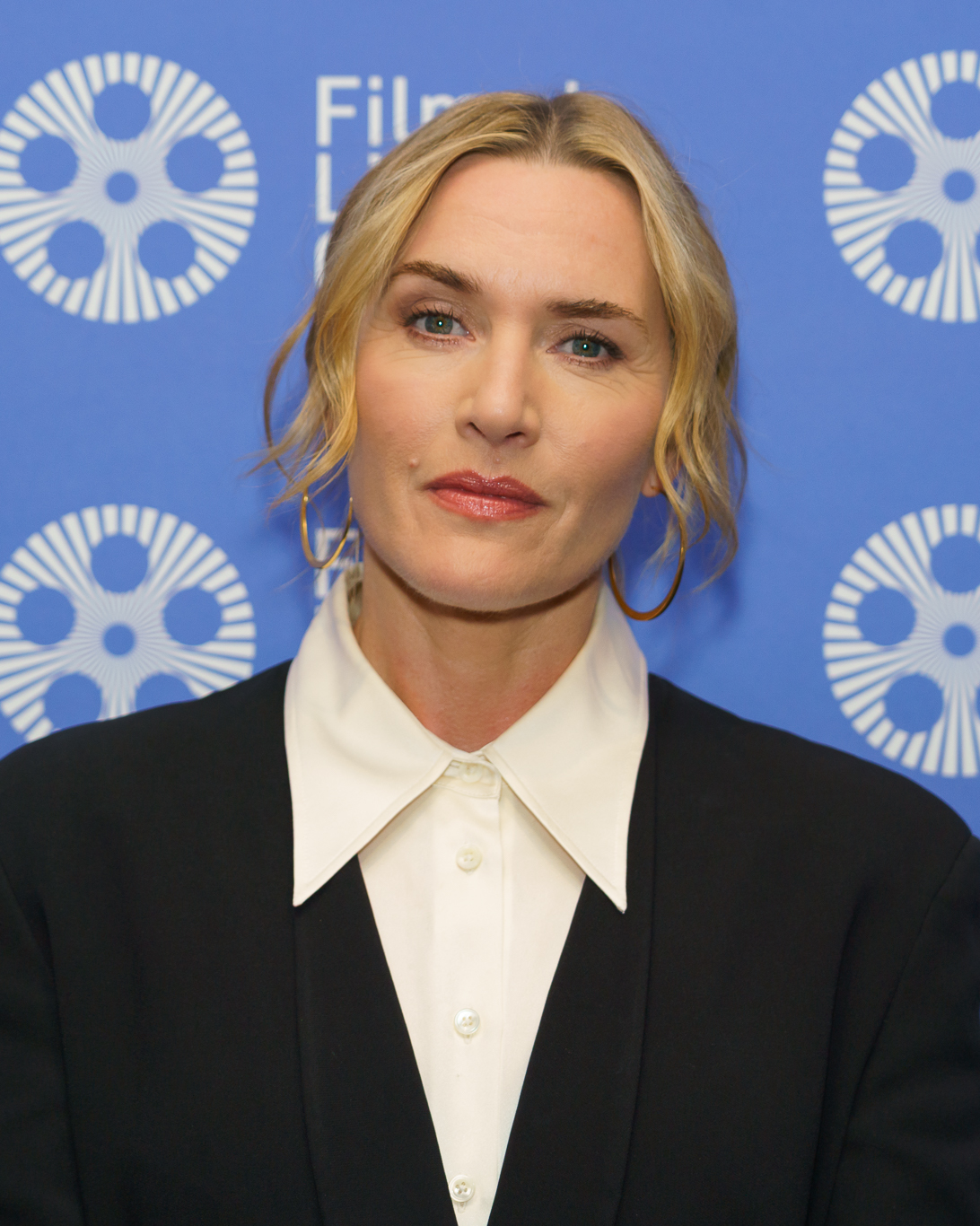
Kate Winslet, Best Actress winner

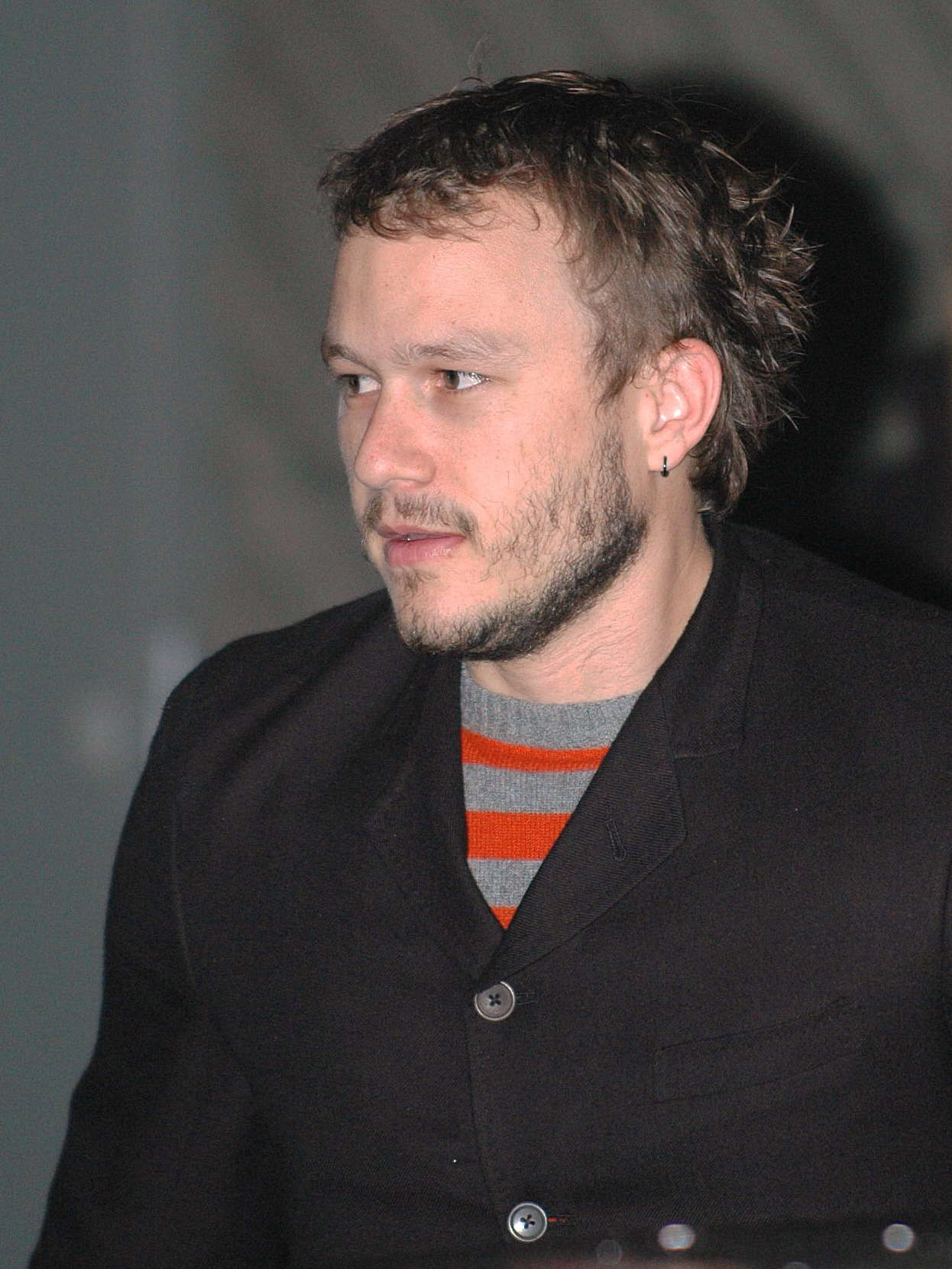
Heath Ledger, Best Supporting Actor winner

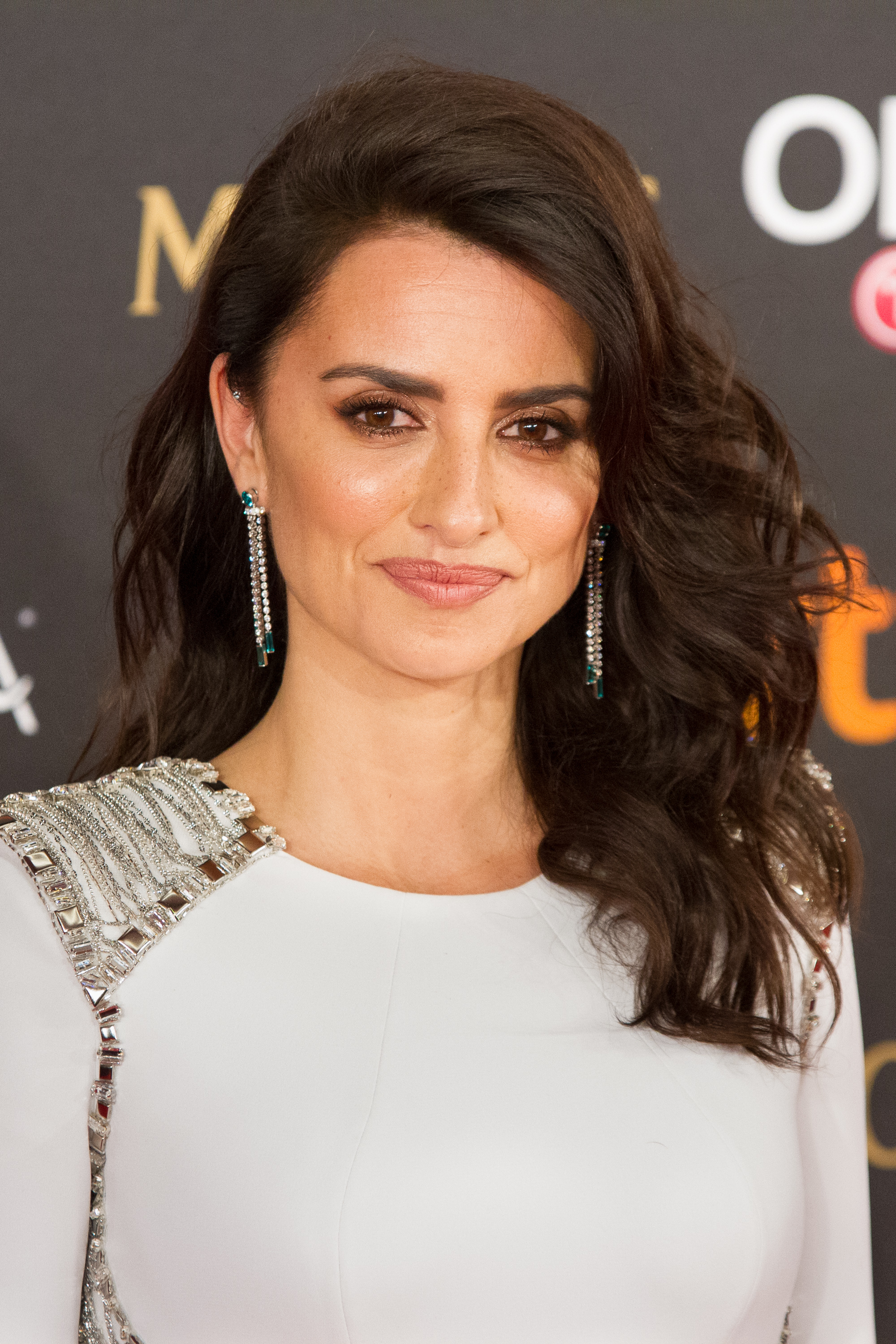
Penélope Cruz, Best Supporting Actress winner

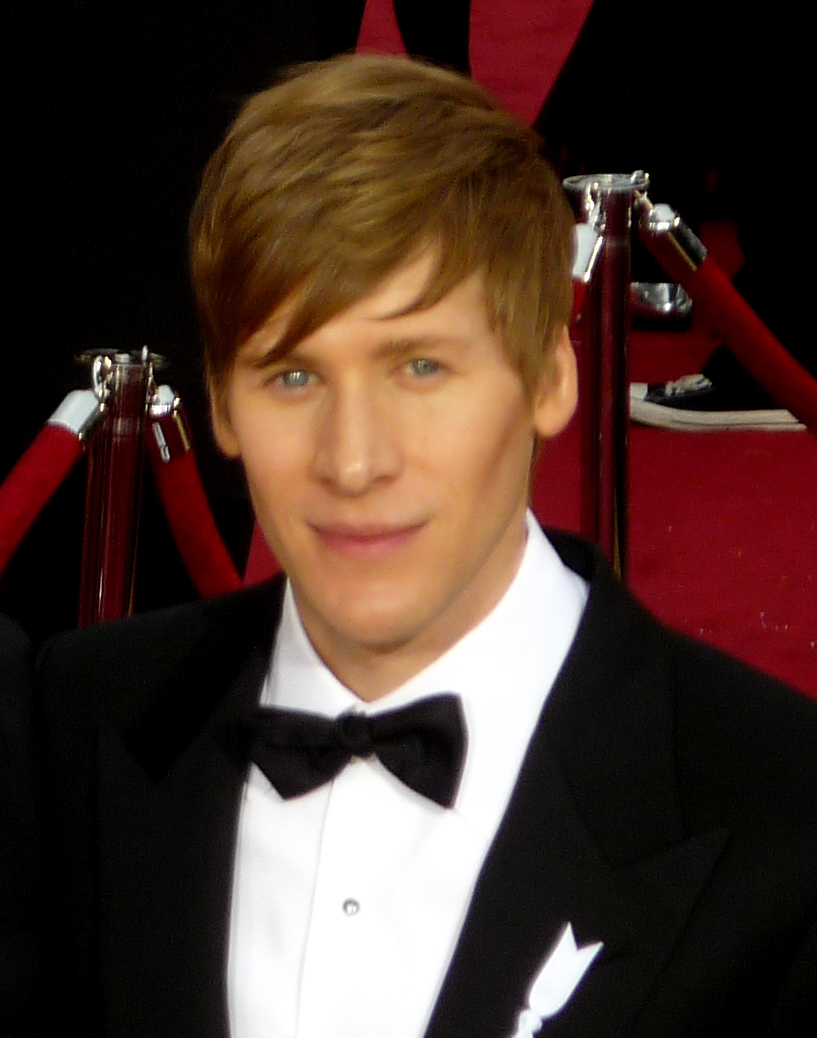
Dustin Lance Black, Best Original Screenplay winner

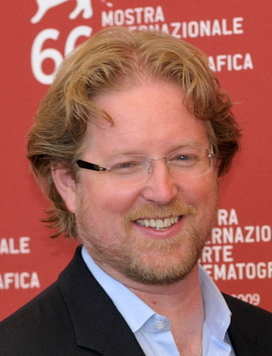
Andrew Stanton, Best Animated Feature winner

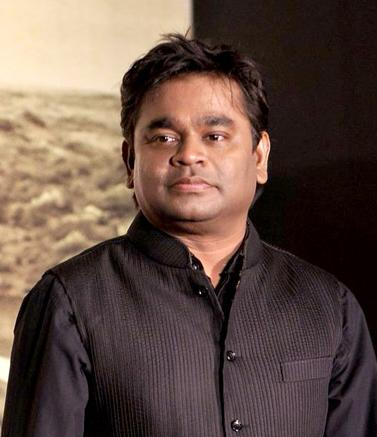
A. R. Rahman, Best Original Score winner and Best Original Song co-winner

Winners are listed first, highlighted in boldface and indicated with a double dagger (‡).

**Best Picture**: **Slumdog Millionaire – Christian Colson, producer**‡; The Curious Case of Benjamin Button – Kathleen Kennedy, Frank Marshall and Ceán Chaffin, producers; Frost/Nixon – Brian Grazer, Ron Howard and Eric Fellner, producers; Milk – Dan Jinks and Bruce Cohen, producers; The Reader – Anthony Minghella, Sydney Pollack, Donna Gigliotti and Redmond Morris, producers	**Best Directing**: **Danny Boyle – Slumdog Millionaire**‡; David Fincher – The Curious Case of Benjamin Button; Ron Howard – Frost/Nixon; Gus Van Sant – Milk; Stephen Daldry – The Reader
**Best Actor in a Leading Role**: **Sean Penn – Milk as Harvey Milk**‡; Richard Jenkins – The Visitor as Walter Vale; Frank Langella – Frost/Nixon as Richard Nixon; Brad Pitt – The Curious Case of Benjamin Button as Benjamin Button; Mickey Rourke – The Wrestler as Randy "The Ram" Robinson	**Best Actress in a Leading Role**: **Kate Winslet – The Reader as Hanna Schmitz**‡; Anne Hathaway – Rachel Getting Married as Kym Buchman; Angelina Jolie – Changeling as Christine Collins; Melissa Leo – Frozen River as Ray Eddy; Meryl Streep – Doubt as Sister Aloysius Beauvier
**Best Actor in a Supporting Role**: **Heath Ledger† – The Dark Knight as The Joker**‡ (posthumous award (Note: Following talks with his family in Australia, the Academy determined that Ledger's daughter, Matilda Rose Ledger, would own the award. However, due to Matilda's age, she did not gain full ownership of the statuette until her eighteenth birthday in 2023. Until that time, her mother, actress Michelle Williams, owned the statuette in trust for Matilda; it was held at the Western Australian Museum. Ledger's family attended the ceremony and his parents and sister accepted the award on stage on his behalf.)); Josh Brolin – Milk as Dan White; Robert Downey Jr. – Tropic Thunder as Kirk Lazarus; Philip Seymour Hoffman – Doubt as Father Brendan Flynn; Michael Shannon – Revolutionary Road as John Givings Jr.	**Best Actress in a Supporting Role**: **Penélope Cruz – Vicky Cristina Barcelona as María Elena**‡; Amy Adams – Doubt as Sister James; Viola Davis – Doubt as Mrs. Miller; Taraji P. Henson – The Curious Case of Benjamin Button as Queenie; Marisa Tomei – The Wrestler as Cassidy/Pam
**Best Writing (Original Screenplay)**: **Milk – Dustin Lance Black**‡; Frozen River – Courtney Hunt; Happy-Go-Lucky – Mike Leigh; In Bruges – Martin McDonagh; WALL-E – Screenplay by Andrew Stanton and Jim Reardon; Original story by Andrew Stanton and Pete Docter	**Best Writing (Adapted Screenplay)**: **Slumdog Millionaire – Simon Beaufoy; based on the novel Q & A by Vikas Swarup**‡; The Curious Case of Benjamin Button – Screenplay by Eric Roth; Screen story by Eric Roth and Robin Swicord; based on the short story by F. Scott Fitzgerald; Doubt – John Patrick Shanley; based on his play; Frost/Nixon – Peter Morgan; based on his stage play; The Reader – David Hare; based on the novel Der Vorleser by Bernhard Schlink
**Best Animated Feature Film**: **WALL-E – Andrew Stanton**‡; Bolt – Chris Williams and Byron Howard; Kung Fu Panda – John Stevenson and Mark Osborne	**Best Foreign Language Film**: **Departures (Japan) in Japanese – Yōjirō Takita**‡; The Baader Meinhof Complex (Germany) in German – Uli Edel; The Class (France) in French – Laurent Cantet; Revanche (Austria) in German – Götz Spielmann; Waltz with Bashir (Israel) in Hebrew – Ari Folman
**Best Documentary (Feature)**: **Man on Wire – James Marsh and Simon Chinn**‡; The Betrayal – Nerakhoon – Ellen Kuras and Thavisouk Phrasavath; Encounters at the End of the World – Werner Herzog and Henry Kaiser; The Garden – Scott Hamilton Kennedy; Trouble the Water – Tia Lessin and Carl Deal	**Best Documentary (Short Subject)**: **Smile Pinki – Megan Mylan**‡; The Conscience of Nhem En – Steven Okazaki; The Final Inch – Irene Taylor Brodsky and Tom Grant; The Witness: From the Balcony of Room 306 – Adam Pertovsky and Margaret Hyde
**Best Short Film (Live Action)**: **Toyland (Spielzeugland) – Jochen Alexander Freydank**‡; Manon on the Asphalt – Elizabeth Marre and Olivier Pont; New Boy – Steph Green and Tamara Anghie; On the Line (Auf der Strecke) – Reto Caffi; The Pig (Grisen) – Tivi Magnusson and Dorte Høgh	**Best Short Film (Animated)**: **La Maison en Petits Cubes – Kunio Katō**‡; Lavatory – Lovestory – Konstantin Bronzit; Oktapodi – Emud Mokhberi and Thierry Marchand; Presto – Doug Sweetland; This Way Up – Alan Smith and Adam Foulkes
**Best Music (Original Score)**: **Slumdog Millionaire – A. R. Rahman**‡; The Curious Case of Benjamin Button – Alexandre Desplat; Defiance – James Newton Howard; Milk – Danny Elfman; WALL-E – Thomas Newman	**Best Music (Original Song)**: **"Jai Ho" from Slumdog Millionaire – Music by A. R. Rahman; lyrics by Gulzar**‡; "Down to Earth" from WALL-E – Music by Peter Gabriel and Thomas Newman; lyrics by Peter Gabriel; "O Saya" from Slumdog Millionaire – Music and lyrics by A. R. Rahman and Maya Arulpragasam
**Best Sound Editing**: **The Dark Knight – Richard King**‡; Iron Man – Frank Eulner and Christopher Boyes; Slumdog Millionaire – Glenn Freemantle and Tom Sayers; WALL-E – Ben Burtt and Matthew Wood; Wanted – Wylie Stateman	**Best Sound Mixing**: **Slumdog Millionaire – Ian Tapp, Richard Pryke and Resul Pookutty**‡; The Curious Case of Benjamin Button – David Parker, Michael Semanick, Ren Klyce and Mark Weingarten; The Dark Knight – Lora Hirschberg, Gary Rizzo and Ed Novick; WALL-E – Tom Myers, Michael Semanick and Ben Burtt; Wanted – Chris Jenkins, Frank A. Montaño and Petr Forejt
**Best Art Direction**: **The Curious Case of Benjamin Button – Art Direction: Donald Graham Burt; Set Decoration: Victor J. Zolfo**‡; Changeling – Art Direction: James J. Murakami; Set Decoration: Gary Fettis; The Dark Knight – Art Direction: Nathan Crowley; Set Decoration: Peter Lando; The Duchess – Art Direction: Michael Carlin; Set Decoration: Rebecca Alleway; Revolutionary Road – Art Direction: Kristi Zea; Set Decoration: Debra Schutt	**Best Cinematography**: **Slumdog Millionaire – Anthony Dod Mantle**‡; Changeling – Tom Stern; The Curious Case of Benjamin Button – Claudio Miranda; The Dark Knight – Wally Pfister; The Reader – Chris Menges and Roger Deakins
**Best Makeup**: **The Curious Case of Benjamin Button – Greg Cannom**‡; The Dark Knight – John Caglione Jr. and Conor O'Sullivan; Hellboy II: The Golden Army – Mike Elizalde and Thomas Floutz	**Best Costume Design**: **The Duchess – Michael O'Connor**‡; Australia – Catherine Martin; The Curious Case of Benjamin Button – Jacqueline West; Milk – Danny Glicker; Revolutionary Road – Albert Wolsky
**Best Film Editing**: **Slumdog Millionaire – Chris Dickens**‡; The Curious Case of Benjamin Button – Kirk Baxter and Angus Wall; The Dark Knight – Lee Smith; Frost/Nixon – Mike Hill and Dan Hanley; Milk – Elliot Graham	**Best Visual Effects**: **The Curious Case of Benjamin Button – Eric Barba, Steve Preeg, Burt Dalton and Craig Barron**‡; The Dark Knight – Nick Davis, Chris Corbould, Tim Webber and Paul Franklin; Iron Man – John Nelson, Ben Snow, Dan Sudick and Shane Mahan

=== Jean Hersholt Humanitarian Award ===
- Jerry Lewis

=== Films with multiple nominations and awards ===
The following 15 films received multiple nominations:

Films with multiple nominations
Nominations	Film
13	The Curious Case of Benjamin Button
10	Slumdog Millionaire
8	The Dark Knight
8	Milk
6	WALL•E
5	Doubt
5	Frost/Nixon
5	The Reader
3	Changeling
3	Revolutionary Road
2	The Wrestler
2	The Duchess
2	Frozen River
2	Iron Man
2	Wanted

The following four films received multiple awards:

Films with multiple awards
Awards	Film
8	Slumdog Millionaire
3	The Curious Case of Benjamin Button
2	The Dark Knight
2	Milk

== Presenters and performers ==
The following individuals presented awards or performed musical numbers.

=== Presenters ===
Name(s)	Role
Gina Tuttle	Announcer for the 81st annual Academy Awards
Whoopi Goldberg; Goldie Hawn; Anjelica Huston; Eva Marie Saint; Tilda Swinton	Presenters of the award for Best Supporting Actress
Tina Fey; Steve Martin	Presenters of the awards for Best Original Screenplay and Best Adapted Screenplay
Jennifer Aniston; Jack Black	Introducers of the Animation 2008 montage and presenters of the awards for Best Animated Feature Film and Best Animated Short Film
Daniel Craig; Sarah Jessica Parker	Presenters of the awards for Best Art Direction, Best Costume Design and Best Makeup
Robert Pattinson; Amanda Seyfried	Introducers of the Romance 2008 montage
Natalie Portman; Ben Stiller	Presenter of the award for Best Cinematography
Jessica Biel	Presenter of the segment of the Academy Awards for Technical Achievement and the Gordon E. Sawyer Award
James Franco; Seth Rogen; Janusz Kamiński	Presenters of the award for Best Live Action Short Film
Alan Arkin; Cuba Gooding Jr. Joel Grey; Kevin Kline; Christopher Walken	Presenters of the award for Best Supporting Actor
Bill Maher	Presenter of the awards for Best Documentary Feature and Best Documentary Short Subject
Will Smith	Presenter of the awards for Best Visual Effects, Best Sound Mixing, Best Sound Editing and Best Film Editing
Eddie Murphy	Presenter of the Jean Hersholt Humanitarian Award
Zac Efron; Alicia Keys	Presenters of the awards for Best Original Score and Best Original Song and introducers of the special song and dance number performing the Best Original Song nominees
Liam Neeson; Freida Pinto	Presenters of the award for Best Foreign Language Film
Queen Latifah	Presenter of the "In Memoriam" tribute
Reese Witherspoon	Presenter of the award for Best Director
Halle Berry; Marion Cotillard; Nicole Kidman; Sophia Loren; Shirley MacLaine	Presenters of the award for Best Actress
Adrien Brody; Michael Douglas; Robert De Niro; Anthony Hopkins; Ben Kingsley	Presenters of the award for Best Actor
Steven Spielberg	Presenter of the Best Picture segment and the award for Best Picture

=== Performers ===
Name(s)	Role	Performed
Michael Giacchino	Musical Arranger	Orchestral
Hugh Jackman; Anne Hathaway	Performers	Opening Number
Hugh Jackman; Beyoncé; Zac Efron; Vanessa Hudgens; Amanda Seyfried; Dominic Cooper; Spirit of Troy	Performers	"Top Hat, White Tie and Tails" from Top Hat "Singin' in the Rain" from Singin' in the Rain "Big Spender" from Sweet Charity "Maria" from West Side Story "You're the One That I Want" from Grease "Maria" from The Sound of Music "All That Jazz" from Chicago "Lady Marmalade" from Moulin Rouge! "One Night Only" from Dreamgirls "You Can't Stop the Beat" from Hairspray "I Don't Know How to Love Him" from Jesus Christ Superstar "At Last" from Orchestra Wives "Last Chance" from High School Musical 3: Senior Year "Mamma Mia" from Mamma Mia! "Don't Cry for Me Argentina" from Evita "Over the Rainbow" from The Wizard of Oz "Somewhere" from West Side Story
A.R. Rahman	Performer	"O Saya" from Slumdog Millionaire
John Legend; Soweto Gospel Choir	Performers	"Down to Earth" from WALL-E
A.R. Rahman; Mahalakshmi Iyer; Tanvi Shah	Performers	"Jai Ho" from Slumdog Millionaire
Queen Latifah	Performer	"I'll Be Seeing You" during the annual "In Memoriam" tribute

== Ceremony information ==
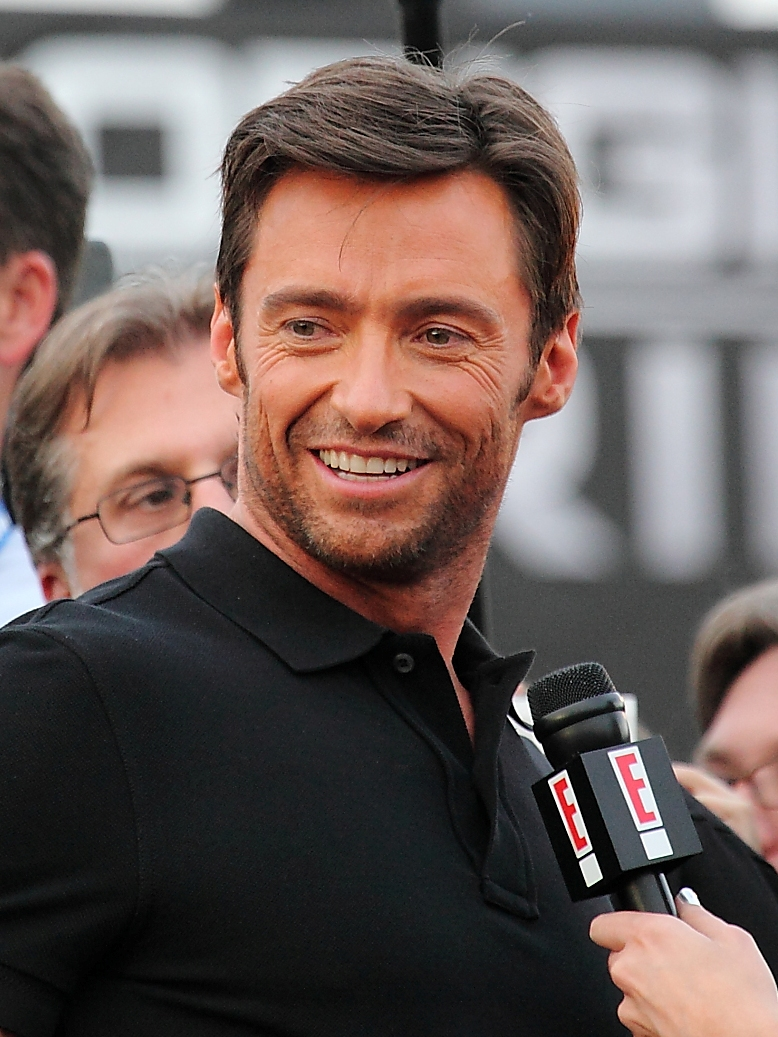
Hugh Jackman hosted the 81st Academy Awards.

Due to the declining viewership of the recent Academy Awards ceremonies, AMPAS had contracted an entirely new production team in an attempt to revive interest surrounding both the awards and festivities. In September 2008, the Academy selected producers Bill Condon and Laurence Mark to co-produce the telecast. Nearly three months later, actor Hugh Jackman, who had previously emceed three consecutive Tony Awards ceremonies between 2003 and 2005, was chosen as host of the 2009 gala. Jackman expressed his anticipation of the awards in the few days preceding, and had commented that he was thrilled with preparations for the ceremony.

Notable changes were introduced in the production of the telecast. In an attempt to build suspense and curiosity leading up to the awards, Condon and Mark announced that they would not reveal any of the presenters or performers who would participate in the Oscarcast. Another unique feature of the ceremony was that the orchestra performed onstage instead of being relegated to a pit. In a break from previous presentations, five previous Oscar-winning performers presented each of the acting categories as opposed to only one or two. In addition, the Academy announced that for the first time since Oscar began broadcasting on television, film studios would be able to televise advertisements promoting their upcoming films. Furthermore, a montage of upcoming 2009 films was shown over the ceremony's closing credits.

Several other people participated in the production of the ceremony. Chris Harrison hosted "Road to the Oscars", a weekly behind-the-scenes video blog on the Oscar ceremony website. David Rockwell designed a new set and stage design for the ceremony. Film historian and author Robert Osborne greeted guests entering the festivities at the Hollywood and Highland Center. Film director Judd Apatow filmed a comedy montage which featured Seth Rogen and James Franco reprising their roles from Pineapple Express. Director Baz Luhrmann produced a song and dance number saluting movie musicals.

Peter Gabriel, who was originally scheduled to perform his nominated song "Down to Earth" from WALL-E during the live broadcast, declined to perform after learning that he would be allowed to sing only 65 seconds of the song during the ceremony's Best Original Song nominee performances. Gabriel still attended the ceremony but singer John Legend, backed by the Soweto Gospel Choir, performed the song in place of Gabriel. Similarly, M.I.A. declined to perform her nominated song "O... Saya" once she learned the performance would last for only one minute.

=== Box office performance of nominated films ===
Continuing a trend in recent years, the field of major nominees favored independent, low-budget films over blockbusters. However, one of the nominees for Best Picture had grossed over $100 million before the nominations were announced (compared with none from the previous year). The combined gross of the five Best Picture nominees when the Oscars were announced was $188 million with an average gross of $37.7 million per film.

The Curious Case of Benjamin Button was the highest earner among the Best Picture nominees with $104.4 million in domestic box office receipts. The film was followed by Slumdog Millionaire ($44.7 million), Milk ($20.7 million), Frost/Nixon ($8.8 million), and finally The Reader ($8.3 million). Among the rest of the top 50 releases of 2008 in U.S. box office before the nominations, 33 nominations went to nine films on the list. Only The Dark Knight (1st), WALL-E (5th), Kung Fu Panda (6th), Bolt (19th), Tropic Thunder (20th), and The Curious Case of Benjamin Button (21st) were nominated for directing, acting, screenwriting, Best Picture or Animated Feature. The other top-50 box office hits that earned nominations were Iron Man (2nd), Wanted (16th), and Hellboy II: The Golden Army (41st).

=== Faked winners leak ===
Shortly after the voting polls were closed for the awards, a purported list of winners was posted online. The list, which bore a purported signature from Academy president Sid Ganis, stated that Mickey Rourke won for Best Actor, Kate Winslet won for Best Actress, Amy Adams won for Best Supporting Actress, Heath Ledger won for Best Supporting Actor, and Slumdog Millionaire won for Best Picture. AMPAS spokeswoman Leslie Unger later revealed that the list was "a complete fraud", and that PricewaterhouseCoopers had just begun to count the ballots.

=== Critical reviews ===
The show received a mixed reception from media publications. Some media outlets received the broadcast more positively. Television critic Robert Bianco of USA Today gave Jackman an average review but extolled producers Condon and Mark saying that the broadcast felt "faster and more intimate without sacrificing Hollywood glamour." Vanity Fair columnist Julian Sancton gave high marks for Jackman's hosting performance stating "After several years of glamour-deflating wisecracks from blasé hosts like Jon Stewart, Ellen DeGeneres, and Steve Martin, the new producers hired an M.C. who was willing to break a sweat." Film critic Roger Ebert lauded Jackman's performance noting that he "would be a charmer as host, and he was." Of the show itself, Ebert added, "It was the best Oscar show I've ever seen, and I've seen plenty."

Other media outlets were more critical of the show. Los Angeles Times columnist Mary McNamara thought Jackman's performance "obliterated all memory" of David Letterman's hosting the ceremony in 1995, which was widely panned. Time television critic James Poniewozik wrote that Jackman was "charming and game and I bet he absolutely killed in the room. But he didn't really project beyond the room, nor did he much seem to be trying to." He also noted that while there were some entertaining moments, "the broadcast overall had problems of pacing." Maureen Ryan of the Chicago Tribune remarked, "The whole thing was driven by a manic desire to bring some old-school glamor to the proceedings." She added that the long introductions praising the acting nominees slowed down the proceedings.

=== Ratings and reception ===
The American telecast on ABC drew in an average of 36.94 million people over its length, which was a 13% increase from the record lows of the previous year's ceremony. An estimated, 68.48 million total viewers watched all or part of the awards. The show also drew higher Nielsen ratings compared to the previous ceremony, with 20.88% of households watching over a 32.44 share. In addition, the program scored a 12.43 rating over a 30.61 share among the 18–49 demographic, which was a 13 percent increase.

In July 2009, the ceremony presentation received ten nominations at the 61st Primetime Emmys. Two months later, the ceremony won four awards including Outstanding Choreography (Rob Ashford), Outstanding Original Music and Lyrics (Hugh Jackman Opening Number: William Ross, John Kimbrough, Dan Harmon, Rob Schrab, Ben Schwartz), Outstanding Short Form Picture Editing, (Best Motion Picture Montage: Kyle Cooper, Hal Honigsberg), and Outstanding Sound Mixing for a Variety Or Music Series Or Special.

== "In Memoriam" ==
The annual "In Memoriam" tribute was presented by actress Queen Latifah. She performed the song "I'll Be Seeing You" during the segment.

- Cyd Charisse – Actress
- Bernie Mac – Actor, comedian
- Bud Stone – Executive
- Ollie Johnston – Animator
- Van Johnson – Actor
- J. Paul Huntsman – Sound actor
- Michael Crichton – Writer, director
- Nina Foch – Actress
- Pat Hingle – Actor
- Harold Pinter – Writer
- Charles H. Joffe – Producer
- Kon Ichikawa – Director
- Charles H. Schneer – Producer
- Abby Mann – Screenwriter
- Roy Scheider – Actor
- David Watkin – Director of photography
- Robert Mulligan – Director
- Evelyn Keyes – Actress
- Richard Widmark – Actor
- Claude Berri – Director
- Maila Nurmi – Actress
- Isaac Hayes – Musician, actor
- Leonard Rosenman – Composer
- Ricardo Montalbán – Actor
- Manny Farber – Film critic
- Robert DoQui – Actor
- Jules Dassin – Director
- Paul Scofield – Actor
- John Michael Hayes – Screenwriter
- Warren Cowan – Publicist
- Joseph M. Caracciolo – Producer
- Stan Winston – Special effects
- Ned Tanen – Executive producer
- James Whitmore – Actor
- Charlton Heston – Actor
- Anthony Minghella – Director, producer
- Sydney Pollack – Director, producer
- Paul Newman – Actor

== See also ==
- 15th Screen Actors Guild Awards
- 29th Golden Raspberry Awards
- 51st Grammy Awards
- 61st Primetime Emmy Awards
- 62nd British Academy Film Awards
- 63rd Tony Awards
- 66th Golden Globe Awards
- List of submissions to the 81st Academy Awards for Best Foreign Language Film
