= Jochen Alexander Freydank =

German film director (born 1967)

- Born: 1967 (age 58–59); East Berlin, East Germany
- Occupation: Film director

Jochen Alexander Freydank is a German film director. Freydank has directed feature films, TV movies, commercials and stage plays, and won various awards, including an Academy Award for his short film Toyland in 2009.

Jochen Alexander Freydank was born in 1967 in East Berlin. He started his career as an editor and assistant director. He is also known as a screenwriter for television and film productions and worked as a producer. He produced one of Germany's most successful TV series. In 1999 he founded his film production company, Mephisto Film.

Freydank's first short film was the macabre comedy Happy End, followed by the short film Emergency. In 2002, he wrote and directed Duty, which had its world premiere at the Montreal World Film Festival. Freydank then directed, co-wrote and produced the short film Toyland, which won more than 30 international awards. In February 2009 TOYLAND won the Oscar for best live-action short film.

Freydank's directorial credits include feature films and TV movies, among them HOMEFRONT, ALLMÄCHTIG, Tatort, and the tragicomedy Und weg bist du, which won the best director award at Bayerischer Fernsehpreis. In 2010 Freydank directed the stage play Johnny Chicago at Berliner Volksbühne. In 2013/2014 he wrote, directed and produced the feature film KAFKA'S THE BURROW. The film had its world premiere at the Busan International Film Festival and its European premiere at the Warsaw International Film Festival. 2014 Freydank wrote and directed GROSSE FISCHE – KLEIE FISCHE, followed by three prime-time movies for German TV in 2015: DER WILDE SVEN, the thriller ZORN – WIE SIE TÖTEN and ENGELMACHER, a police crime drama. In 2016 he directed the TV movies DÜNNES EIS and TRUGSPUR. He then directed two German TV movies in Barcelona, Spain: ÜBER WASSER HALTEN and TOD AUS DER TIEFE, and in 2017 the thriller "DAS JOSHUA PROFIL" based on the best selling novel Das Joshua Profil by Sebastian Fitzek. In 2018 he realized another thriller: DEIN LEBEN GEHÖRT MIR and 2019 a four episodes miniseries called DU SOLLST NICHT LÜGEN. In 2020 another literary adaptation followed: ZERO. Zero is a dark social media thriller based on the bestselling novel by Marc Elsberg starring Heike Makatsch. 2021 he directed a miniseries called HERZOGPARK for RTL+. In 2022 he wrote and directed the miniseries RIESENDING - JEDE STUNDE ZÄHLT, based on a true story. The award-winning German, Austrian, Swiss, Croatian coproduction told the story of the extremely challenging rescue of a cave explorer in Europes deepest cave and was released July 2023 on Netflix.

Freydank is a member of the Academy of Motion Picture Arts and Sciences.

== Filmography as director ==
- 2023: Tatort: Aus dem Dunkel
- 2022: Riesending - Jede Stunde zählt (miniseries)
- 2021: Herzogpark (miniseries)
- 2021: Zero
- 2020: Du sollst nicht luegen (miniseries)
- 2019: Dein Leben gehoert mir
- 2018: Das Joshua Profil
- 2017: Tod aus der Tiefe
- 2017: Über Wasser halten
- 2016: Trugspur
- 2016: Polizeiruf 110: Duennes Eis
- 2015: Zorn – Wie sie töten
- 2015: Der wilde Sven
- 2015: Engelmacher
- 2014: Grosse Fische – Kleine Fische
- 2014: Kafka's The Burrow
- 2013: Tatort: Allmächtig
- 2012: Und weg bist du
- 2010: Tatort: Heimatfront (Homefront)
- 2007: Toyland (Spielzeugland)
- 2002: Duty (Dienst)
- 2001: Emergency (Notfall)
- 1999: Happy End (Glückliches Ende)

== Theatre ==
- 2010: Johnny Chicago (Berliner Volksbühne)

== Filmography as producer ==
- 2014: Kafka's The Burrow
- 2007–2009: In aller Freundschaft
- 2007: Endlich Samstag!
- 2007: Toyland (Spielzeugland)
- 2002: One Single Moment
- 2002: Duty (Dienst)
- 2002: The Last Journey
- 2001: Emergency (Notfall)
- 1999: Happy End (Glückliches Ende)

== Filmography as writer ==
- 2022: Riesending - Jede Stunde zählt (miniseries)
- 2015: Grosse Fische – Kleine Fische
- 2014: Kafka's The Burrow
- 2008: Polizeiruf 110 – Taximord
- 2007: Toyland
- 2003: Medicopter 117 – Jedes Leben zählt
- 2002: Duty (Dienst)
- 2001: Klinikum Berlin Mitte – Leben in Bereitschaft
- 2001: Emergency (Notfall)
- 1999: Happy End (Glückliches Ende)

== Awards ==
=== 2022 ===
- Grimme Preis, nomination "Riesending - Jede Stunde zählt"
- Blauer Panther, nomination Lisa Maria Potthoff, best actress "Herzogpark"
- Jupiter Award, nomination Heike Makatsch, best actress "Herzogpark"

=== 2021 ===
- Jupiter Award, nomination "Du sollst nicht lügen" best TV series
- Bayerischer Fernsehpreis, nomination Barry Atsma, best actor "Du sollst nicht lügen"
- Hessischer Fernsehpreis, nomination Felicitas Woll, best actress "Du sollst nicht lügen"

=== 2020 ===
- Jupiter Award, nomination Vladimir Burlakov, best actor "Dein Leben gehört mir"

=== 2016 ===
- Jupiter Award, nomination Kristina Klebe, best actress "Kafka's the Burrow"

=== 2015 ===
- Edinburgh International Film Festival, nomination for "Kafka's the Burrow"
- Neisse Film Festival, best set design for "Kafka's the Burrow"
- Shanghai International Film Festival, nomination for "Kafka's the Burrow"
- Bari International Film Festival, nomination for "Kafka's the Burrow"

=== 2014 ===
- Busan International Film Festival, nomination for "Kafka's the Burrow"
- Warsaw International Film Festival, nomination for "Kafka's the Burrow"

=== 2013 ===
- Bayerischer Fernsehpreis, best director for "Und weg bist du"

=== 2009 ===
- OSCAR live action short film for Toyland
- Phoenix Film Festival, United States, world cinema best short for Toyland
- Anchorage Film Festival, United States, audience award for Toyland
- Washington Jewish Film Festival, United States, audience award for Toyland
- Kansas City Film Fest, United States, best narrative short for Toyland
- Pittsburgh Jewish Film Festival, United States, audience award for Toyland
- Hong Kong Jewish Film Festival, audience award for Toyland
- Rehoboth Film Festival, United States, audience award for Toyland
- Villa Mare Film Festival, Italy, audience award for Toyland
- Reno Film Festival, United States, best foreign film for Toyland
- Portland International Film Festival, United States, audience award (second place) for Toyland
- Lenola Film Festival, Italy, best film + "best Soundtrack" for Toyland
- Shorts at moonlight, Germany, audience award for Toyland
- New Jersey Film Festival, United States, honorable mention for Toyland
- Cleveland International Film Festival, United States, audience award for Toyland
- San Diego Jewish Film Festival, United States, audience award for Toyland

=== 2008 ===
- Short Shorts Film Festival Tokyo, Japan, audience award for Toyland
- Friedrich-Wilhelm-Murnau-Stiftung, Germany short film award for Toyland
- Bermuda International Film Festival, Bermuda Short Film Award for Toyland
- Rhode Island International Film Festival, United States, second place International Discovery Award for Toyland
- Giffoni Film Festival, Italy, APEC Award in gold for Toyland
- Montreal World Film Festival, Canada nomination for "Toyland"
- Alpinale, Austria, audience award, for Toyland
- Odense International Film Festival, Danmark, best children and youth film for Toyland
- Alemeria en Corto, Filmfestival, Spain, jury award & audience award for Toyland
- Los Angeles Jewish Film Festival, United States audience award for Toyland
- Palm Springs International Festival of Short Films, United States, audience award for Toyland
- Sedicicorto – International Film Festival Forli, Italy, Best short film for Toyland
- Asheville Film Festival, United States, Best short film for Toyland
- Victoria Independent Film Festival, Australia, Best short under 20 minutes for Toyland
- Festival Internacional de Cortometrajes de Almería, Spain, audience award- and jury award for Toyland

=== 2007 ===
- Valladolid International Film Festival, Spain, Golden Spike for Toyland

=== 2004 ===
- Montecatini Film Festival, Italy, best film International Panorama for "Duty"

=== 2003 ===
- Rüsselsheimer Kurzfilmtage, special award for "Duty"
- Montreal World Film Festival, Canada nomination for "Duty"
- Fantastisk Filmfestival Malmö, Sweden, nomination for best European short film for "Duty"

=== 2002 ===
- Audience award, Spotlight, internationales TV- und Werbefilm Festival for Hanfstreu
- Cindy Award in Gold by the Association of Audio Visual Communicators for Hanfstreu
- Silberner Bär, Festival der Nationen, Austria for Emergency
- Corto web award, Arcipelago Film Festival, Rome, Italy for Emergency

=== 2001 ===
- Kommunikationsverband: "Die Klappe in Bronze", for Hanfstreu
- Audience award at the online film festival "Shorts welcome" for Happy End (Glückliches Ende)
