= Michael Kuhn =

English film producer

Michael Ashton Kuhn (born 7 May 1949) is a Kenyan-born English film producer based primarily in England.

== Career ==
Kuhn was born in 1949 in Nairobi, Kenya. At age 13, he traveled to England to study at Dover College and then read law at Clare College, Cambridge. He joined PolyGram in 1975, and in 1991 he set up the subsidiary PolyGram Filmed Entertainment (PFE). In 1999, when PolyGram merged with Universal Music Group, he went independent and formed the production company Qwerty Films. He published his memoir 100 Films and a Funeral in 2001. This was later turned into a documentary of the same name, charting the rise and fall of PolyGram Filmed Entertainment. In 2002 he was appointed Chair of the National Film and Television School.

Kuhn was appointed Commander of the Order of the British Empire (CBE) in the 2021 New Year Honours for services to the film industry.

== Personal life ==
Kuhn married his wife Caroline in 1995 and has two sons. One, named George, the other Jacob.

== Filmography ==
- P.I. Private Investigations (1987)
- The Blue Iguana (1988)
- Kill Me Again (1989)
- Fear, Anxiety & Depression (1989)
- Daddy's Dyin': Who's Got the Will? (1990)
- Wild at Heart (1990)
- Ruby (1992)
- Red Rock West (1993)
- Being John Malkovich (1999)
- Wondrous Oblivion (2003)
- The Order (2003)
- Stage Beauty (2004)
- Kinsey (2004)
- I Heart Huckabees (2004)
- The Amateurs (2005)
- Alien Autopsy (2006)
- Severance (2006)
- The Duchess (2008)
- The Last Days on Mars (2013)
- Suite Française (2014)
- Florence Foster Jenkins (2016)
- Golda (2022)
- Cleaner (2025)

== Arms ==
Coat of arms of Michael Kuhn
Notes Granted 25 November 2021 (183/329). Crest Upon a Helm with a Wreath Or and Sable A Raccoon statant Proper. Escutcheon Or a Chevronel issuant in sinister chief throughout the lower limb in fess the whole chevronny reversed Argent and Sable. Motto Kindness Is All Badge A Bear rampant Sable holding between the forepaws a Fountain.
