= Matthias Paul =

Matthias Paul may refer to:

- Matthias Paul (actor) (born 1964), a German actor
- Matthias Paul (DJ) (born 1971), a German DJ, producer and musician known under the stage name Paul van Dyk

== See also ==
- Matthias Paul Kramer
- Paul Matthias Wehner
- Matthias (given name)
- Paul (name)
