= Michael O'Connor (costume designer) =

British costume designer (born 1965)

- Born: 27 October 1965 (age 60); London, England
- Years active: 1993–present

Michael O'Connor (born 27 October 1965) is a British costume designer. His accolades include an Academy Award and a BAFTA Award.

== Life and career ==
O'Connor was born in London, England. He began his training as a dresser at the Old Vic and then spent six years in a costume house before deciding to go freelance.

In the 1990s, O'Connor went into the film industry. His early works as a wardrobe supervisor was on such films as The House of the Spirits (1993) and Emma (1996). Then he was elevated to an assistant costume designer and worked in this role on several notable films, these include Oscar and Lucinda (1997), Topsy-Turvy (1999), and Quills (2000). In addition, he was an associate costume designer on Harry Potter and the Chamber of Secrets (2002).

After working as costume designer on several minor British films, he came to prominence with his work on Tom Brown's Schooldays, a TV movie for ITV. He then worked on his most high-profile film up until then, the film version of Giles Foden's bestselling novel, The Last King of Scotland. He then worked on Brick Lane as well as Miss Pettigrew Lives for a Day.

He came to the attention of the film industry in 2009, when he received the Academy Award for Best Costume Design, the BAFTA Award for Best Costume Design as well as the Satellite Award for Best Costume Design for The Duchess.

In 2014, he started working on costumes for Tulip Fever.

In 2021, he was nominated for another BAFTA Award for Best Costume Design for his work on Ammonite.

== Filmography ==
Year	Title
2001	The Mystic Masseur
2005	Nomad: The Warrior
2006	The Last King of Scotland
2007	Brick Lane
2008	Miss Pettigrew Lives for a Day
2008	The Duchess
2011	The Eagle
2011	Jane Eyre
2012	Dredd
2013	The Invisible Woman
2015	Suite Française
2015	Muhammad: The Messenger of God
2017	Tulip Fever
2018	A Private War
2018	All Is True
2019	Fanny Lye Deliver'd
2020	Ammonite
2021	The Electrical Life of Louis Wain
2022	Emily
2022	Out of Darkness
2023	Firebrand
2023	Lee
2026	The Runner

== Awards and nominations ==
Major associations

Academy Awards

Year	Category	Nominated work	Result	Ref.
2009	Best Costume Design	The Duchess	Won	
2012	Best Costume Design	Jane Eyre	Nominated	
2014	Best Costume Design	The Invisible Woman	Nominated	

BAFTA Awards

Year	Category	Nominated work	Result	Ref.
British Academy Film Awards
2009	Best Costume Design	The Duchess	Won	
2012	Best Costume Design	Jane Eyre	Nominated	
2014	Best Costume Design	The Invisible Woman	Nominated	
2021	Best Costume Design	Ammonite	Nominated	

Miscellaneous awards

List of Michael O'Connor other awards and nominations
Award	Year (Note: Indicates the year of ceremony. Each year is linked to the article about the awards held that year, wherever possible.)	Category	Title	Result	Ref.
Apolo Awards	2022	Best Costume Design	Ammonite	Nominated	
British Independent Film Awards	2008	Best Technical Achievement	The Duchess	Nominated	
British Independent Film Awards	2020	Best Costume Design	Ammonite	Nominated	
British Independent Film Awards	2021	Best Costume Design	The Electrical Life of Louis Wain	Nominated	
British Independent Film Awards	2024	Best Costume Design	Firebrand	Won	
Capri Hollywood International Film Festival	2008	Capri Umberto Tirelli Award	The Duchess	Won (Note: Tied with Daniela Ciancio for Il divo)	
Costume Designers Guild Awards	2009	Excellence in Period Film	The Duchess	Won	
Costume Designers Guild Awards	2012	Excellence in Period Film	Jane Eyre	Nominated	
Critics' Choice Awards	2012	Best Costume Design	Jane Eyre	Nominated	
European Film Awards	2021	Best Costume Designer	Ammonite	Won	
Evening Standard British Film Awards	2012	Technical Achievement	Jane Eyre	Nominated	
Phoenix Film Critics Society Awards	2008	Best Costume Design	The Duchess	Won	
Phoenix Film Critics Society Awards	2011	Best Costume Design	Jane Eyre	Nominated	
Satellite Awards	2008	Best Costume Design	The Duchess	Won	
Satellite Awards	2011	Best Costume Design	Jane Eyre	Nominated	
Satellite Awards	2014	Best Costume Design	The Invisible Woman	Won	
