= Blackout (Elsberg novel) =

2012 novel by Marc Elsberg

Blackout: Tomorrow Will Be Too Late
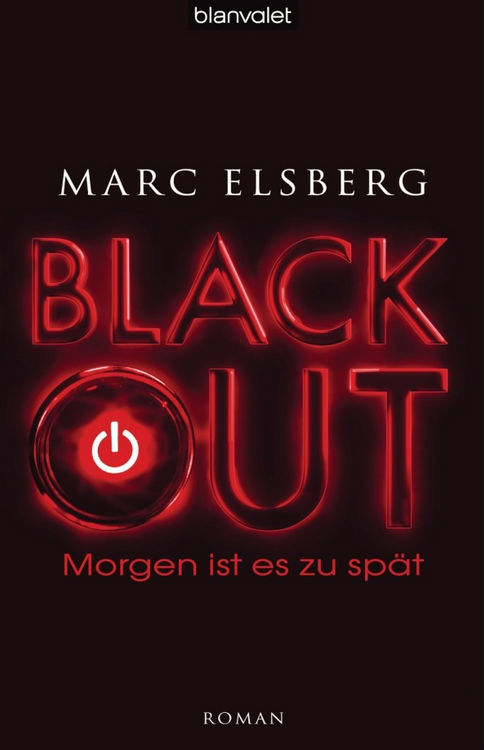
- Cover of the German edition (2012).
- Author: Marc Elsberg
- Original title: Blackout – Morgen ist es zu spät
- Language: German
- Subject: Power outage
- Genre: thriller
- Publisher: Black Swan
- Publication date: 2012
- English publication date: 2017
- Pages: 350
- Awards: Wissenschaftsbuch des Jahres 2012
- ISBN: 978-1784161897 (first edition in English)
- Followed by: Zero – Sie wissen, was du tust

Blackout: Tomorrow Will Be Too Late is a disaster thriller book by the Austrian author Marc Elsberg, described by Penguin Books as "a 21st-century high-concept disaster thriller".

Published in German in 2012, as of 2016 it had been translated into fifteen languages and sold a million copies worldwide. The English version was published in 2017.

The novel is about a European power outage due to a cyberattack. For realism the book is written on the basis of interviews with intelligence and computer security officials.

== Plot ==
The novel starts with a collapse of electrical grids across Europe, plunging the population into darkness and disaster. The prolonged electricity cut causes major problems: no more petrol, no telephone, no food in supermarkets, no cash machines working, nuclear disasters, etc. A former computer hacker and IT professional tries to find out the root cause for this. While doing so he himself becomes a hunted person as officials find suspicious e-mails sent from his laptop and think that he is involved.

== Film adaptation ==
The novel is currently being adapted into a miniseries starring Moritz Bleibtreu, directed by Oliver Rihs and Lancelot von Naso and is scheduled to begin filming in fall 2020.

== See also ==
- Societal collapse
- Cyberwarfare
- Smart meter § Security
