= Tom Hodge =

British composer

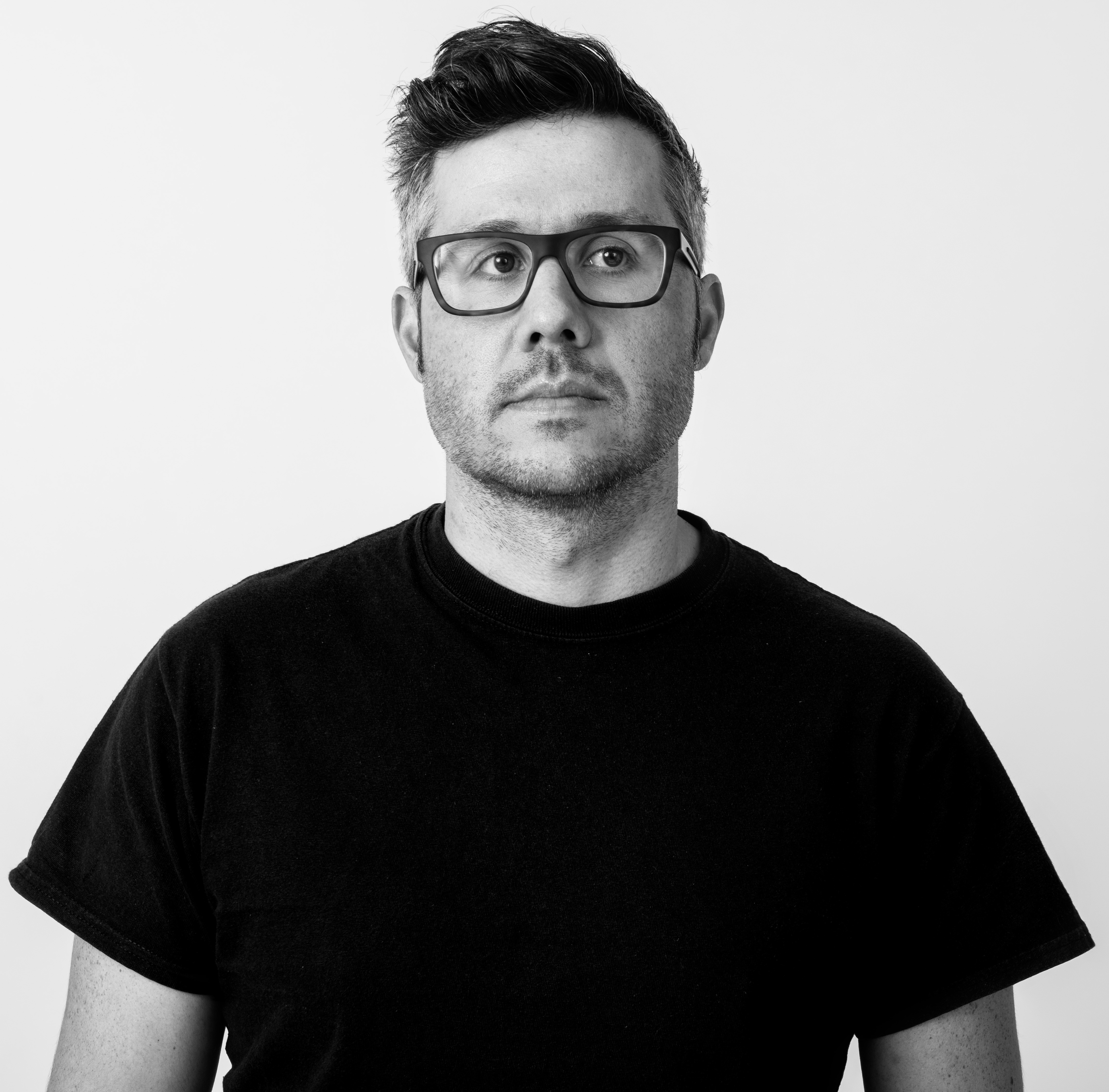
- Tom Hodge in 2016

Background information
- Occupation: Composer
- Years active: 2000s–present

Tom Hodge is a British composer known for his work in film, television and documentary. He is based between London and Cork, Ireland. His credits include The Mauritanian, McMafia, The Ipcress File, Cleaner and Testimony. He won the Ivor Novello Award for Best Original Film Score for Testimony in 2026.

== Career ==
Tom Hodge composed the score for the feature film The Mauritanian, directed by Kevin Macdonald and starring Jodie Foster, Tahar Rahim and Benedict Cumberbatch. His collaborations with Macdonald include High & Low: John Galliano, Last Song from Kabul, and Klitschko: More Than a Fight.

In 2026, he composed the music for The Last First: Winter K2, a documentary film directed by Amir Bar-Lev and acquired globally by Apple Original Films.

In 2025, Hodge composed the score for the action thriller Cleaner, directed by Martin Campbell and starring Daisy Ridley, Clive Owen and Taz Skylar.

He has also composed music for television series including McMafia and The Ipcress File. He contributed additional music to the Netflix action film Extraction 2 starring Chris Hemsworth. In 2019, he received an Ivor Novello Award nomination for his score for the BBC and PBS documentary series Rise of the Nazis. In 2026, Hodge won the Ivor Novello Award for Best Original Film Score for Testimony, directed by Aoife Kelleher.

== Artist releases ==
Alongside his film and television work, Hodge has released music as a recording artist and collaborator. With electronic musician Franz Kirmann, he formed the duo Piano Interrupted, which released the albums Two by Four, The Unified Field and Landscapes of the Unfinished.

Hodge collaborated with electronic producer Max Cooper on the EPs Fragmented Self Part One and Fragmented Self Part Two, which combined contemporary classical composition and electronic music.

In 2018, Hodge collaborated with Czech composer and multimedia artist Floex on the album A Portrait of John Doe, released by Mercury KX. The album was reviewed positively by several specialist music publications.

== Selected filmography ==
=== Film ===
- The Mauritanian (2021)
- High & Low: John Galliano (2023)
- Last Song from Kabul (2023)
- Klitschko: More Than a Fight (2024)
- Testimony (2025)
- Cleaner (2025)
- The Last First: Winter K2 (2026)
- The Runner (2026)

=== Television ===
- McMafia (2018)
- The Ipcress File (2022)
- Rise of the Nazis (2019)

== Awards and nominations ==
Year	Award	Category	Work	Result	Ref.
2019	Ivor Novello Awards	Best Television Soundtrack	Rise of the Nazis	Nominated	
2026	Ivor Novello Awards	Best Original Film Score	Testimony	Won	
