= This Way Up (film) =

This Way Up is a 2008 short film directed by Alan Smith and Adam Foulkes. It follows the story of two undertakers trying to deliver a body to a graveyard. It was nominated for the Academy Award for Best Animated Short Film at the 81st Academy Awards, but lost to Japanese film La Maison en Petits Cubes.
