= The Last First: Winter K2 =

2026 film by Amir Bar-Lev

- Promotional release poster
- Directed by: Amir Bar-Lev
- Produced by: Howard T. Owens; Ben Silverman; Sean Richard; Sarah Thomson; John Battsek
- Cinematography: Will Pugh
- Edited by: Joe Carey
- Music by: Tom Hodge
- Production companies: Propagate; Ventureland; Object Studios
- Distributed by: Apple Original Films (worldwide); Dogwoof (United Kingdom)
- Release dates: January 22, 2026 (Sundance); October 2, 2026 (United States)
- Running time: 97 minutes
- Countries: United Kingdom; United States
- Languages: English; Urdu; Icelandic

The Last First: Winter K2 is a 2026 documentary film which follows a team of mountaineers who, in 2021, attempt to make the first successful winter ascent of K2, the second-highest mountain on Earth in Pakistan. The film is directed by Amir Bar-Lev. It premiered at the 2026 Sundance Film Festival and received positive reviews from critics.

== Release ==
The film was released in the United States in select theaters and streaming on Apple TV on October 2, 2026.

== Reception ==
On the review aggregator website Rotten Tomatoes, 97% of 33 critics' reviews are positive, with an average rating of 7.5/10. Metacritic, which uses a weighted average, assigned the film a score of 72 out of 100, based on nine critics, indicating "generally favorable" reviews.

=== Footage and consent concerns ===
Mingma David Sherpa, one of the climbers who completed K2's first winter ascent, raised concerns about the documentary's factual representation, subtitle translations, and use of expedition footage and images of Nepali climbers. He questioned whether permission had been obtained for the material and called on the production company and Apple TV to clarify its ownership, authorization and commercial use.
