= Rebecca Alleway =

English set decorator

- Occupation: set decorator
- Years active: 1994–present
- Website: http://www.rebeccaalleway.com/

Rebecca Alleway is an English set decorator. She was nominated at the 81st Academy Awards in the category of Best Art Direction for her work on the film The Duchess—sharing her nomination with art director Michael Carlin—, and won an Emmy for Production Design for the Andor episode "Who Are You?"—with Luke Hull and Toby Britton.

Alleway attended the John Hanson Community School and Cricklade College, both in Andover, Hampshire.

== Selected filmography ==
- What a Girl Wants (2003)
- The Duchess (2008)
- The Eagle (2011)
- Salmon Fishing in the Yemen (2011)
- Cloud Atlas (2012)
- Tulip Fever (2015)
- A United Kingdom (2016)
- Murder on the Orient Express (2017)
