= Michael Carlin (art director) =

Australian art director

- Occupation: production designer
- Years active: 1990-present

Michael Carlin is an Australian art director who was nominated at the 81st Academy Awards for the film The Duchess. He was nominated for Best Art Direction, which his nomination was shared with Rebecca Alleway.

== Selected filmography ==
- What a Girl Wants (2003)
- The Last King of Scotland (2006)
- Mr. Bean's Holiday (2007)
- The Duchess (2008)
- In Bruges (2008)
- Salmon Fishing in the Yemen (2011)
- Red Tails (2012)
