= Cleaner (2025 film) =

2025 British film by Martin Campbell

- Theatrical release poster
- Directed by: Martin Campbell
- Screenplay by: Simon Uttley; Paul Andrew Williams; Matthew Orton
- Produced by: Michael Kuhn; Gavin Glendinning; Sebastien Raybaud; Callum Christopher Grant; Thomas Fanning; Chris Arthur; Cindy Cowan
- Starring: Daisy Ridley; Taz Skylar; Clive Owen
- Cinematography: Eigil Hensen
- Edited by: Jim Page; Cheryl Potter
- Music by: Tom Hodge
- Production companies: Anton; Qwerty Films
- Distributed by: Sky Cinema
- Release dates: 21 February 2025 (United States); 2 May 2025 (United Kingdom)
- Running time: 97 minutes
- Country: United Kingdom
- Language: English
- Budget: $25 million
- Box office: $1.3 million

Cleaner is a 2025 British action thriller film directed by Martin Campbell and written by Simon Uttley, Paul Andrew Williams, and Matthew Orton. The film stars Daisy Ridley, Taz Skylar and Clive Owen.

Cleaner was released in the United States on 21 February 2025, and in the United Kingdom by Sky Cinema on 2 May 2025.

== Plot ==
Joanna "Joey" Locke and her older brother Michael grow up in a troubled London household, which has forced Joey to take up wall-climbing to escape her abusive father. Twenty years later, as an adult and former soldier, Joey looks after Michael, who is autistic and crusading online against corruption at his care homes. One day, Joey is forced to take him to her workplace at One Canada Square, Canary Wharf, where she works as a window cleaner.

While Joey cleans windows on the highrise alongside her colleague Noah, Michael slips away in an attempt to join her. Amidst a shareholder gala held by the Agnian Energy Company in the building, an environmental activist group naming itself Earth Revolution, of which Noah is a member, executes a violent takeover using sleeping gas canisters and taking Agnian's administration, including company owners Geoffrey and Gerald Milton, and guests hostage. Marcus Blake, the group's leader, is intent on exposing Agnian's hypocrisy, as the company is promoting environmental exploitation and pollution, contrary to its publicly declared goal of switching to cleaner, renewable forms of energy, and has even murdered arrested members of the group before they could testify in their trials. When Geoffrey tries to parley with them, Noah kills him despite Blake's orders, and Gerald runs off to hide. After the fugitive is cornered, Noah, who disagrees with Blake's idealism, murders him and his loyalists, usurps leadership of the group and rigs the hostages with explosives fitted with a dead man's switch synchronized to Noah's heartbeat.

Joey and Michael just barely escape being knocked out, but Joey is stuck on the building's facade. Her use of a SOS fire signal alerts the terrorists to her presence, but they leave her outside, believing her neutralized. As the police surround the building, Noah forces the hostages to record confessions about their crimes for Agnian or their complicity in them, and coerces Joey into framing herself as a terrorist, focusing the authorities' attention on her for the moment. Claire Hume, the leader of the police task force, luckily doubts appearances and allows Joey to contact her, thus learning about the actual situation. After Hume vainly tries to negotiate with Noah, she reluctantly gives Joey permission to infiltrate the building and create an opening for the SWAT teams' assault.

Noah tries to murder Joey by lowering an explosive charge down to her position, but she barely escapes and has Hume have SWAT shoot several holes into the building's bulletproof glass windows, allowing her entry with Michael's help. Noah sends some of his men after them, but Joey and Michael kill them and seize their weapons. After taking over the control room, and seeing one of Noah's old antihumanist YouTube video clips in which Noah announces his intention of blowing up the building and the hostages, Michael feeds it into the internet, exposing Noah's crusade as a farce, and transfers the forced confessions to a USB drive.

After sending Michael downstairs and telling Hume to send her men in, Joey lures Noah to her in order to disable the bomb trigger. While the commandos secure the hostages, Joey and Noah face off in a brutal brawl near a hole in the facade caused by the earlier explosion. During their fight, Joey swipes the trigger device from Noah's wrist and attaches it to her own, then pushes Noah out of the blast hole to fall to his death. After the police clear the building and a short debriefing with Hume, Joey reunites with Michael. They use the information on the drive to expose Agnian's corruption to the world, and retreat to the coast for some quiet time together.

== Cast ==
- Daisy Ridley as Joanna "Joey" Locke, a former SRR working as a window cleaner
  - Poppy Townsend White as young Joey
- Matthew Tuck as Michael Locke, Joey's older brother, who is autistic and an online anti-corruption crusader
  - Dudley Watts as young Michael
- Clive Owen as Marcus Blake, the leader of a radical ecoactivist group called Earth Revolution
- Taz Skylar as Noah Santos / Lucas Vander, Joey's coworker, a member of Earth Revolution and a radical antihumanist
- Flavia Watson as Zee, a member of Earth Revolution and the group's hacking specialist
- Ruth Gemmell as Superintendent Claire Hume (erroneously credited as "DS - Detective Sergeant - Hume")
- Ray Fearon as DI Kahn, Hume's assistant
- Howard Charles as Captain Royce, leader of the police SWAT team
- Rufus Jones as Geoffrey Milton, owner and CEO of Agnian Energy and Gerald's brother
- Lee Boardman as Gerald Milton, owner of Agnian Energy and Geoffrey's brother
- Richard Hope as Alistair Lawson
- Gavin Fleming as Derek, Joey's supervisor

== Production ==
The film was directed by Martin Campbell and produced by Anton, with Sebastien Raybaud and Callum Grant as producers.

=== Casting ===
In May 2023, Daisy Ridley was confirmed in the lead role. Later that month, Clive Owen joined the cast. In October 2023, Taz Skylar joined the cast.

=== Filming ===
Principal photography was reported by Screen Daily to have started in London in September 2023. First look images from Ridley filming in London appeared in the media in October 2023. Parts of Canary Wharf were recreated in Winnersh Film Studios.

== Release ==
Sky Original Film acquired the rights to the film with plans for an early 2025 release on Sky Cinema. The film was released in the United States on 21 February 2025, by Quiver Distribution.

== Reception ==
On the review aggregator website Rotten Tomatoes, 51% of 95 critics' reviews are positive, with an average rating of 5.4/10. The website's consensus reads: "Daisy Ridley's credible action chops and Martin Campbell's smooth direction keep Cleaner from being a mess, but this thriller borrows one too many elements from better predecessors to have a polished identity of its own." Metacritic, which uses a weighted average, assigned the film a score of 51 out of 100, based on 17 critics, indicating "mixed or average" reviews.

Frank Scheck of The Hollywood Reporter gave the film a positive feedback and wrote, "Director Campbell clearly knows his way around this sort of material, resulting in some tense, well-staged action sequences that make Cleaner reasonably diverting for its concise running time."

Robert Kojder of Flickering Myth rated the film a rating of 3/5 and said, "This film deserves to find an audience; 10 or 15 years ago, it would entertain at multiplexes and likely do solid box office numbers. The whole Hollywood system needs cleaning."

Giving a 3/4 rating, Mick LaSalle of San Francisco Chronicle wrote, "Cleaner is a good-not-great thriller in the Die Hard mold that gets an extra lift from Campbell's skillful direction and from Ridley, who is slowly but surely showing herself to be a performer of wide range and appeal."

== See also ==
- Die Hard (1988)
