= High & Low – John Galliano =

- Theatrical release poster
- Directed by: Kevin Macdonald
- Produced by: Kevin Macdonald; Chloe Mamelok
- Cinematography: David Harriman; Magda Kowalczyk; Patrick Blossier; Nelson Hume
- Edited by: Avdhesh Mohla
- Music by: Tom Hodge
- Production companies: TF1 Studio; Anton; KGB Films; Condé Nast Entertainment
- Distributed by: Mubi
- Release dates: 1 September 2023 (Telluride); 8 March 2024 (United States, United Kingdom, and Ireland)
- Running time: 116 minutes
- Countries: United Kingdom; United States; France
- Languages: English; French
- Box office: $340,994

High & Low – John Galliano is a 2023 documentary film which details the career of fashion designer John Galliano. It was directed by Kevin Macdonald.

== Reception ==
On the review aggregator website Rotten Tomatoes, 87% of 38 critics' reviews are positive, with an average rating of 7.1/10. The website's consensus reads: "High & Low - John Galliano surveys a public figure's fall from grace with intelligence and even-handedness, making for a consistently compelling watch." Metacritic, which uses a weighted average, assigned the film a score of 58 out of 100, based on 14 critics, indicating "mixed or average" reviews.
