= Toyland (film) =

- Poster
- Directed by: Jochen Alexander Freydank
- Written by: Johann A. Bunners; Jochen Alexander Freydank
- Produced by: Jochen Alexander Freydank, David C. Bunners, Christoph Nicolaisen
- Starring: Julia Jäger; Cedric Eich; Tamay Bulut Öztavan; Torsten Michaelis; Claudia Hübschmann; David C. Bunners; Gregor Weber; Jürgen Trott; Klaus-Jürgen Steinmann; Heike W. Reichenwallner; Matthias Paul
- Cinematography: Christoph Nicolaisen
- Edited by: Anna Kappelmann
- Music by: Ingo Ludwig Frenzel
- Production company: Mephistofilm
- Release date: 2007
- Running time: 14 minutes
- Country: Germany
- Language: German
- Budget: 30,000 Euro

Toyland (German: Spielzeugland) is a 2007 German short film directed and co-written by Jochen Alexander Freydank. It won the 2009 Oscar for Best Live Action Short Film.

== Cast ==
- Julia Jäger - Marianne Meißner
- Cedric Eich - Heinrich Meißner
- Tamay Bulut Öztavan - David Silberstein
- Torsten Michaelis - Herr Silberstein
- Claudia Hübschmann - Frau Silberstein
- David C. Bunners - SS-Obersturmführer Falke
- Gregor Weber - SS officer Werner
- Jürgen Trott - Policeman
- Klaus-Jürgen Steinmann - Blockwart
- Heike W. Reichenwallner - neighbor
- Matthias Paul - Gestapo officer

== Synopsis ==
The film is set in Nazi Germany in 1942. An Aryan family, the Meißners, and a Jewish family, the Silbersteins, are neighbors and friends. The respective sons in each family, Heinrich Meißner and David Silberstein, discreetly take piano lessons together. The deportation of the Silbersteins to a concentration camp is imminent, and when Heinrich asks why they may have to go soon, Frau Meißner does not tell Heinrich the truth. She instead invents a story that the Silbersteins will go to a new place called "Toyland". Heinrich says that when the Silbersteins go, he wants to go with them, so that he can still be with his friend David, which terrifies Frau Meißner.

The morning the Silbersteins are taken away for deportation, Heinrich is found missing from his room. His mother, Marianne Meißner begins to search for Heinrich. She encounters ridicule from Gestapo officers after she explains her situation, because they think that she is Jewish. However, after she shows her papers that prove that she is Aryan, they accept her story about Heinrich and assist in searching for him. The search continues until the last moment before the train with the Silbersteins on it must leave.

When the train doors are opened, Marianne calls out to Heinrich. The crowd moves aside and Marianne sees a boy she thinks is Heinrich hugging the Silbersteins, but instead it is David. A flashback shows that when the Silbersteins were taken away, Heinrich was not allowed to join them. Marianne realizes that Heinrich is not with them, but - to save his life - calls out to David as though he is Heinrich. The Silbersteins let go of him and all continue the ruse that David is Heinrich. David returns to the Meißners home where he is raised with Heinrich as their own son.

== Production ==
According to Freydank, it took two years to secure financing for the production, whose costs totaled €30,000. The actors and production crew initially received no salary. Starting on 22 January 2007, the film was shot in 5 days in and around the Berlin area. Exactly one year later, on 22 January 2008, the film received its German premiere at the Saarbrücken "Film Festival Max Ophüls Preis". The nominations of the Academy of Motion Picture Arts and Sciences of the 2008 short subjects were announced on 22 January 2009, with Spielzeugland on the list. On 22 February 2009, Spielzeugland received the Oscar for Best Short Subject (Live Action).

== Awards ==
=== 2009 ===
- Oscar for Best Live Action Short Film for Toyland
- Washington Jewish Film Festival, USA, audience award for Toyland
- Kansas City Film Fest, USA, best narrative short for Toyland
- Phoenix Film Festival, USA, world cinema best short for Toyland
- Pittsburgh Jewish Film Festival, USA, audience award for Toyland
- Hong Kong Jewish Film Festival, USA, audience award for Toyland
- Rehoboth Film Festival, USA, audience award for Toyland
- Villa Mare Film Festival, Italy, Publikumspreis for Toyland
- Reno Film Festival, USA, best foreign film for Toyland
- Portland International Film Festival, USA, audience award (second place) for Toyland
- Lenola Film Festival, Italien, best film + "best Soundtrack" for Toyland
- Shorts at moonlight, D, audience award for Toyland
- Anchorage Film Festival, USA, audience award for Toyland
- New Jersey Film Festival, USA, honorable mention for Toyland
- Cleveland International Film Festival, USA, audience award for Toyland
- San Diego Jewish Film Festival, USA, audience award for Toyland

=== 2008 ===
- Short Shorts Film Festival Tokio, Japan, audience award for Toyland
- Friedrich-Wilhelm-Murnau-Stiftung short film award for Toyland
- Bermuda International Film Festival, Bermuda Short Film Award for Toyland
- Rhode Island International Film Festival, second place International Discovery Award for Toyland
- Giffoni Film Festival, Italy, APEC Award in Gold for Toyland
- Alpinale Vorarlberg, Austria, audience award, for Toyland
- Odense International Film Festival, Danmark, best children and youth film for Toyland
- Alemeria en Corto, Filmfestival, Spanien, jury award & audience award for Toyland
- Los Angeles Jewish Film Festival, USA audience award for Toyland
- Palm Springs International Festival of Short Films, USA, audience award for Toyland
- Sedicicorto – International Film Festival Forli, Italy, Best short film for Toyland
- Asheville Film Festival, USA, Best short film for Toyland
- Victoria Independent Film Festival, Australia, Best short under 20 minutes for Toyland
- Festival Internacional de Cortometrajes de Almería, audience award- and jury award for Toyland

=== 2007 ===
- Semana Internacional de Cine de Valladolid|Valladolid International Film Festival, Golden Spike for Toyland
