= Winnersh Film Studios =

British film studio

- Interactive map of the Winnersh Film Studios area

General information
- Location: 1100 Eskdale Road, Winnersh, Berkshire, England
- Coordinates: 51.4387°N 0.8855°W
- Current tenants: Parkside Film Studios
- Opening: 2022, 2025

Winnersh Film Studios is a film studio located in Winnersh, Berkshire, England. It is located around 4 miles (6.4 km) from central Reading and is operated by Parkside Film Studios.

== History ==
Winnersh Film Studios was a part of a new wave of film studios being developed in the UK in the early 2020s to meet the growing demand for production space. The studio was a project by Stage Fifty, a company that provides "rapid-build" and high-spec sound stages. The long-term ambition for the site, located at the Winnersh Triangle Business Park, was to create a new "creative-quarter" with up to six sound stages.

In March 2022, Wokingham Borough Council granted temporary planning permission for two sound stages and eight workshops for a period of five years. This was to meet immediate demand for studio space. Permanent permission was later granted in January 2024 for these stages, along with a third, larger stage. The studio's location was considered advantageous due to its proximity to the M4 motorway, a railway station, and other film studios in the area such as Shinfield and Arborfield Studios.

In April 2024, Winnersh Film Studios and its parent company, Stage Fifty, entered into administration. The companies cited a "detrimental impact" on cash flow from the 2023 Hollywood writers' and actors' strikes. Following the administration, the studio ceased operations.

In April 2025, an application was made to Wokingham Borough Council to demolish the studio's buildings. The council approved the demolition plans, with the aim of redeveloping the site for other business purposes. The company "Winnersh Film Studios Ltd" was officially dissolved in July 2025.

In September 2025, it was reported that a European investment firm, SCIO Capital, had secured a 30-year lease for the site and planned to relaunch the studios on a smaller footprint under the new name Parkside Studios Limited.

Since operations recommended, Parkside Studios has undertaken a raft of upgrades to the infrastructure of the site including installation of mains water, mains drainage, high speed fibre-line connections to its offices, sound stages and workshops. Also a number of security upgrades including: access control systems, Installation of site wide CCTV systems, new perimeter high security fencing and automated gates providing a secure compound operated and manned 24/7/365.

As of June 2026, Parkside welcomed its first high end TV production following earlier commercials and pick-ups, with an international cast, produced by a huge European media and production company.

== Productions ==
- The Boys in the Boat (2023)
- Ghostbusters Frozen Empire (2024)
- Cleaner (2025)
- A Working Man (2025)
- Dinner with the Parents (2024)
- Argylle (2024)
- Kraven the Hunter (2024)
- Red Bulls Racing Promotional Video (2025)
- The Roses (2024)
- Too Much S1, E1 (2025)
