= Jane Eyre (2011 film) =

2011 film by Cary Joji Fukunaga

- British cinema poster
- Directed by: Cary Joji Fukunaga
- Screenplay by: Moira Buffini
- Based on: Jane Eyre by Charlotte Brontë
- Produced by: Alison Owen; Paul Trijbits
- Starring: Mia Wasikowska; Michael Fassbender; Jamie Bell; Judi Dench
- Cinematography: Adriano Goldman
- Edited by: Melanie Oliver
- Music by: Dario Marianelli
- Production companies: Focus Features; BBC Films; Ruby Films
- Distributed by: Focus Features (United States); Universal Pictures (International)
- Release dates: 9 March 2011 (New York premiere); 11 March 2011 (United States); 9 September 2011 (United Kingdom)
- Running time: 120 minutes
- Countries: United Kingdom; United States
- Languages: English; French
- Box office: $41.4 million

Jane Eyre is a 2011 romantic gothic drama film directed by Cary Joji Fukunaga and written by Moira Buffini based on Charlotte Brontë's 1847 novel of the same name, starring Mia Wasikowska and Michael Fassbender.

The film was released on 11 March 2011 in the United States and 9 September in Great Britain and Ireland. It received positive reviews from critics. The film's costume design, led by Michael O'Connor, was nominated for an Academy Award.

== Plot ==
A tearful Jane Eyre runs away from Thornfield Hall, finding herself alone on the moors. She collapses at the doorstep of Moor House, home of St. John Rivers and his sisters Diana and Mary; they take Jane in and nurse her back to health.

The film flashes between Jane's recovery and her grim childhood. An orphan, she is treated cruelly by her cousin John and aunt Mrs. Reed. Jane is sent to the Lowood School for Girls; under the strict Mr. Brocklehurst, the girls are beaten, but Jane befriends fellow pupil Helen Burns, who dies of consumption.

Eight years later, Jane, now 18, leaves Lowood for a position at Thornfield Hall. Welcomed by the kindly housekeeper Mrs. Fairfax, Jane begins a plain and isolated life as governess to Adèle Varens, the young French ward of Thornfield's owner. One day, Jane sees a rider thrown by his horse and comes to his aid. Returning to Thornfield, she learns the man is Edward Rochester, master of the house. He grudgingly praises her instruction of Adèle, and her own "openness and unpolluted mind”; the two find themselves curiously attracted to one another.

One night, Jane discovers Rochester's room on fire, which they manage to extinguish; he warns her not to speak of the incident, and they share a chaste but passionate moment. The next day, Rochester leaves suddenly to call on Blanche Ingram, who Mrs. Fairfax tells Jane is Rochester's prospective wife; she and her family return with him a few weeks later on a grand visit to Thornfield.

Rochester confronts Jane, who is hurt by Blanche's presence, but is interrupted by an unexpected guest – Richard Mason from Spanish Town, Jamaica, whose arrival disturbs Rochester. That night, the household is awakened by a scream. Rochester reassures the guests, but brings Jane to tend to Mason, who has been badly injured. Jane notices a hidden door in Rochester's room before Mason is taken away by a doctor. Rochester confides in Jane, cryptically, that he is haunted by a past mistake but has fallen for a new woman in his life; Jane believes he means Blanche.

Jane receives word that her cousin John has committed suicide, leading her aunt to suffer a stroke. Jane returns to her dying aunt, who gives her a letter from Jane's paternal uncle, John Eyre, asking that Jane live with him in Madeira as his heir. The letter is three years old, and Mrs. Reed admits to writing to John to the effect that Jane had died at Lowood. Jane forgives her aunt and returns to Thornfield, beginning a correspondence with John.

Faced with Rochester's impending marriage to Blanche, Jane tells Rochester she will leave Thornfield and confesses her true feelings for him. Rochester declares that Jane is his only love and proposes; she accepts. At their wedding, Mason appears with a lawyer and reveals that Rochester is already married to Mason's sister, Bertha. Rochester admits the truth and takes Jane to meet his violently deranged wife, kept in a hidden room at Thornfield. Rochester explains that his father made him marry Bertha for her money, but she gradually descended into madness and he locked her away rather than subject her to an asylum; she had been responsible for the strange happenings in the house. Rochester pleads with Jane to stay, but wounded by his deception, she leaves Thornfield.

After her recovery at Moor House, St. John gives Jane a teaching position and a cottage. One night, she imagines a knock at her door to be Rochester, but instead finds St. John with news that her uncle John has died and left her his fortune of £20,000 (equivalent to £1,200,000 in 2011). Jane offers to share her inheritance with St. John and his sisters, and the four live together at Moor House. St. John asks Jane to marry and accompany him to India as missionaries, but she rejects him.

Jane returns to Thornfield to find the house a blackened ruin. She learns from Mrs. Fairfax that Bertha set fire to the house; Rochester was able to rescue everyone but his wife. Jane visits Rochester, now blind, and the two are reunited.

== Cast ==
- Mia Wasikowska as Jane Eyre
- Michael Fassbender as Edward Fairfax Rochester
- Jamie Bell as St. John Rivers
- Judi Dench as Mrs Fairfax
- Sally Hawkins as Mrs Reed
- Holliday Grainger as Diana Rivers
- Tamzin Merchant as Mary Rivers
- Simon McBurney as Mr Brocklehurst
- Imogen Poots as Blanche Ingram
- Sophie Ward as Lady Ingram
- Su Elliot as Hannah
- Jayne Wisener as Bessie Lee
- Amelia Clarkson as young Jane
- Romy Settbon Moore as Adèle Varens
- Freya Parks as Helen Burns
- Harry Lloyd as Richard Mason
- Valentina Cervi as Bertha Antoinetta Mason
- Craig Roberts as John Reed
- Ben Roberts as Briggs

== Production ==
=== Pre-production ===
The film was produced by Alison Owen's company Ruby Films, with financial support from BBC Films, Focus Features and Lipsynch Productions. The script by Moira Buffini appeared on the 2008 Brit List, a film-industry-compiled list of the best unproduced screenplays in British film. The story is largely presented by way of flashbacks. In October 2009, it was announced that Cary Fukunaga would direct the adaptation. Fukunaga had been in England promoting a film when he attended meetings at the BBC and learned about their plans for a new adaptation. The filmmakers decided to play up the Gothic elements of the classic novel. Fukunaga stated, "I've spent a lot of time rereading the book and trying to feel out what Charlotte Brontë was feeling when she was writing it. That sort of spookiness that plagues the entire story... there's been something like 24 adaptations and it's very rare that you see those sorts of darker sides. They treat it like it's just a period romance and I think it's much more than that."

=== Casting ===
Mia Wasikowska starred as the title character and Michael Fassbender as Edward Rochester. Fukunaga and the producers wanted an actress close to Jane Eyre's age in the novel, in contrast to many previous versions. Fukunaga liked Wasikowska's "sense of observation in her eyes" and that "[she] could communicate [Jane's inner turmoil] in a way that didn't feel theatrical". He felt her looks could be played down as required for the role. On casting Rochester, the director stated that while there were actors closer in appearance, he felt Fassbender had the spirit of the character. Jamie Bell, Judi Dench, Sally Hawkins, Simon McBurney, Imogen Poots, Holliday Grainger and Tamzin Merchant also joined the cast.

=== Filming ===
Principal photography began on 22 March 2010 and concluded in mid-May. Filming locations included London and various locations in Derbyshire and the Derbyshire Dales, including Chatsworth House, Haddon Hall, the village of Froggatt and the Fox House pub in Sheffield, as well as Broughton Castle in Oxfordshire and Wrotham Park in Hertfordshire. The score is composed by Academy Award winner Dario Marianelli. Another Academy Award winner, Michael O'Connor, designed the costumes. Although they estimated the setting was the late 1830s, they settled on four to five years later in 1843. Fukunaga commented that "the clothing style of the '30s was just awful. Every woman looked like a wedding cake." However, they decided to allow a few characters in older fashions to reflect that some would not have updated their style.

He looked at some 60 residences for one to represent Thornfield Hall but settled on Haddon Hall as it had not undergone much redecorating; the same location was also used in the 2006 series of Jane Eyre. The conditions were very cold and Fukunaga admitted that Wasikowska nearly got hypothermia on the second day while shooting the rain sequence; however, he could not imagine filming anywhere else, saying "Northern England – Yorkshire and Derbyshire, the moors and dales – they look like they're something straight out of a Tim Burton horror film. The trees are all twisted by the wind; the bracken and the heather on the moors have this amazing hue. And the weather is so extreme and it changes all the time. The house even, Haddon Hall, is just so steeped in history, the spaces, the galleries, they sort of just breathe and you feel the presence of the history." Key scenes were filmed in Broughton Castle.

== Release ==
=== Box office ===
The film had a limited release on four screens in the United States on 11 March 2011. It grossed $182,885, for a per cinema average of $45,721 – the best speciality debut of 2011. As of 14 July 2011, its North American total stood at $11,242,660. After the United States, it was released in a number of countries during the spring and summer of 2011, but not until 9 September was it released in the United Kingdom and Ireland. In its opening week, Jane Eyre moved to third place in the UK box office, behind The Inbetweeners Movie and Friends with Benefits.

=== Critical reception ===
Review aggregator Rotten Tomatoes gives the film an approval score of 85% based on 170 critical reviews, with an average rating of 7.3/10. The site's consensus reads, "Cary Fukunaga directs a fiery and elegant adaptation, while Mia Wasikowska delivers possibly the best portrayal of the title character ever." It also has a score of 76 out of 100 on Metacritic, based on 35 critics, indicating "generally favorable" reviews.

A. O. Scott made the film an "NYT Critics' Pick", saying "This Jane Eyre, energetically directed by Cary Joji Fukunaga (Sin Nombre) from a smart, trim script by Moira Buffini (Tamara Drewe), is a splendid example of how to tackle the daunting duty of turning a beloved work of classic literature into a movie. Neither a radical updating nor a stiff exercise in middlebrow cultural respectability, Mr. Fukunaga's film tells its venerable tale with lively vigor and an astute sense of emotional detail."

Richard Corliss of Time named Mia Wasikowska's performance one of the Top 10 Movie Performances of 2011.

== Accolades ==
Year of ceremony	Award	Category	Recipient(s)	Result
2011	National Board of Review Awards	Spotlight Award	Michael Fassbender (Also for Shame, A Dangerous Method, and X-Men: First Class)	Won
2011	Satellite Awards	Best Costume Design	Michael O'Connor	Nominated
2011	British Independent Film Awards	Best Actress	Mia Wasikowska	Nominated
2011	Los Angeles Film Critics Association Awards	Best Actor	Michael Fassbender (Also for Shame, A Dangerous Method, and X-Men: First Class)	Won
2012	Central Ohio Film Critics Association Awards	Actor of the Year	Michael Fassbender (Also for Shame, A Dangerous Method, and X-Men: First Class)	Nominated
2012	Goya Awards	Best European Film		Nominated
2012	Australian Academy of Cinema and Television Arts Award	Best Actress - International	Mia Wasikowska	Nominated
2012	Evening Standard British Film Awards	Best Actor	Michael Fassbender (Also for Shame)	Won
2012	Evening Standard British Film Awards	London Film Museum Award for Technical Achievement	Michael O'Connor	Nominated
2012	BAFTA Awards	Costume Design	Michael O'Connor	Nominated
2012	Academy Awards	Best Costume Design	Michael O'Connor	Nominated
2012	Sant Jordi Award	Best Foreign Actor	Michael Fassbender (Also for A Dangerous Method and X-Men: First Class)	Won
