= Qwerty Films =

British film production company

- Formerly: Kuhn & Co. (1999-2003)
- Type: Private
- Founded: July 9, 1999; 27 years ago
- Founder: Michael Kuhn
- Headquarters: 5 First Floor, 5 Fleet Place, London, United Kingdom

Qwerty Films is a British film production company set up by film producer Michael Kuhn in 1999; the name likely comes from the letters that start off most computer keyboards, "Q-W-E-R-T-Y".

== Productions ==
- Cleaner (2025)
- Golda (2022)
- Florence Foster Jenkins (2016)
- Suite française (2014)
- The Last Days on Mars (2013)
- Carrying the Light (2011) (TV)
- The Duchess (2008)
- Severance (2006)
- Alien Autopsy (2006)
- The Amateurs (2005)
- I Heart Huckabees (2004)
- Kinsey (2004)
- Stage Beauty (2004)
