= The Duchess (film) =

2008 film by Saul Dibb

- Theatrical release poster
- Directed by: Saul Dibb
- Screenplay by: Jeffrey Hatcher; Anders Thomas Jensen; Saul Dibb
- Based on: Georgiana, Duchess of Devonshire by Amanda Foreman
- Produced by: Gabrielle Tana; Michael Kuhn
- Starring: Keira Knightley; Ralph Fiennes; Charlotte Rampling; Dominic Cooper; Hayley Atwell; Simon McBurney; Aidan McArdle; John Shrapnel
- Cinematography: Gyula Pados
- Edited by: Masahiro Hirakubo
- Music by: Rachel Portman
- Production companies: BBC Films; Qwerty Films; Magnolia Mae Films
- Distributed by: Pathé Distribution (France and United Kingdom); BIM Distribuzione (Italy); Paramount Vantage (United States)
- Release dates: 5 September 2008 (United Kingdom); 10 October 2008 (United States); 12 November 2008 (France); 23 December 2008 (Italy)
- Running time: 110 minutes
- Countries: France; Italy; United Kingdom; United States
- Language: English
- Budget: £13.5 million
- Box office: $43.3 million

The Duchess is a 2008 historical drama film directed by Saul Dibb, who co-wrote the screenplay with Jeffrey Hatcher and Anders Thomas Jensen, based on the 1998 book Georgiana, Duchess of Devonshire by Amanda Foreman, about the late 18th-century English aristocrat Georgiana Cavendish, Duchess of Devonshire. She was a distant relation of Diana, Princess of Wales, from whom the quote "There were three people in her marriage" on the promotional poster comes from. The Duchess was the older sister of Lady Diana's great-great-great-grandfather, George Spencer, 2nd Earl Spencer.

The Duchess was released on 5 September 2008 in the United Kingdom. The film received generally positive reviews from critics. It won the Best Costume Design and was nominated for Best Art Direction at the 81st Academy Awards.

== Plot ==
In 1774, the young Georgiana Spencer is contracted in marriage to William Cavendish, Duke of Devonshire, with the expectation that she produce his male heir. She is quickly disillusioned by her husband, especially when Charlotte, William’s illegitimate child whose mother has died, comes to live with them while Georgiana is pregnant. William expects Georgiana to tolerate the child's presence and practice "mothering" on her.

When Georgiana gives birth to a girl, William is displeased. In his mind, he has fulfilled his obligations to her as her husband. However, by failing to provide him with a legitimate male heir, she has failed in her obligations as his wife.

Georgiana becomes a leading light in fashionable society. She socialises with the young Lady Bess Foster at Bath and invites her to live with them since Bess has nowhere else to go. William has an affair with her, causing Georgiana to feel robbed of her only friend and betrayed by Bess. Bess tells Georgiana that her motive is to regain her three sons (whom her husband has taken from her), so she continues to live with them.

Georgiana begins an affair with Charles Grey. They have known each other since their youth, and he declares he has always loved her. William is outraged when Georgiana suggests that since he has Bess, she should be allowed Charles. He rapes her; a male child is the product. Bess encourages the affair between Georgiana and Charles after the birth of Georgiana's son.

Soon, the whole of London society learns of Georgiana's affair. William threatens to end Charles's political career and forbids Georgiana from seeing her children again if she does not end the relationship. After initially refusing, Georgiana ends her relationship with Charles Grey.

However, Georgiana tells William that she is pregnant with Charles's child. She is sent to the countryside where she gives birth to her daughter with Charles Grey, Eliza Courtney, who is given to the Grey family to raise as Charles's niece. Georgiana finds comfort in Bess's friendship when she gives birth to Eliza. Georgiana and William come to terms with one another, and along with Bess, continue their lives together.

The after-credits reveal Georgiana secretly visits her daughter Eliza. Eliza goes on to name her own daughter Georgiana, after her mother. Charles later becomes prime minister under William IV. Before she dies, Georgiana permits William and Bess to marry.

== Cast ==
- Keira Knightley as Georgiana Cavendish, Duchess of Devonshire
- Ralph Fiennes as William Cavendish, 5th Duke of Devonshire
- Charlotte Rampling as Georgiana Spencer, Countess Spencer, Georgiana's mother
- Dominic Cooper as Charles Grey, 2nd Earl Grey
- Hayley Atwell as Lady Elizabeth 'Bess' Foster
- Simon McBurney as The Right Honourable Charles James Fox
- Aidan McArdle as The Right Honourable Richard Brinsley Sheridan
- John Shrapnel as General Grey, the 1st Earl Grey
- Alistair Petrie as Heaton
- Richard McCabe as Sir James Hare
- Calvin Dean as Devonshire House Servant
- Emily Jewell as Nanny
- Bruce Mackinnon as actor playing Sir Peter Teazle in The School for Scandal
- Georgia King as actress playing Lady Teazle in The School for Scandal
- Sebastian Applewhite as Sir Augustus Clifford, 1st Baronet
- Camilla Arfwedson as Lady Charlotte

== Production ==
The Duchess was produced by British Qwerty Films and American Magnolia Mae Films, with financial support from BBC Films, French Pathé, and Italian BIM Distribuzione. The film was shot at Twickenham Film Studios and on location at Chatsworth, Bath, Holkham Hall, Clandon Park, Kedleston Hall, Somerset House, King's College London and the Old Royal Naval College in Greenwich.

Regarding lead actress Keira Knightley, director Saul Dibb said The Duchess was "a chance to take a character from late childhood – she's married at 17 – into full adulthood, 10 years later." It was also a chance for Knightley to work with Ralph Fiennes, whom she regarded as one of her most accomplished co-stars to date; Dibb said, "When I said, 'We've got Ralph interested in playing the Duke,' we both took a gulp and went, 'F---.' [sic] ... But I didn't for one second feel that she wasn't up to the task." Originally, the film was to be directed by Susanne Bier.

== Release ==
=== Marketing ===
The film advertisements which featured Diana, Princess of Wales were criticised by Knightley and Amanda Foreman, the author of the film's source material.

Studio executives wanted to use digitally altered images of Keira Knightley in promotional materials. The alterations were specifically aimed at enlarging her breasts. Knightley objected to the alterations, and they were not used. Although multiple media reports suggested that the use of parallels between the central character's life and that of Diana, Princess of Wales was being used as a marketing strategy for the project, Knightley denied any such connection.

=== Theatrical release ===
The BBFC has classified the film as a 12A, citing the scene of implied marital rape, which is "delivered through Georgiana's screams of protest, heard from outside the bedroom door." The BBFC's PG rating allows implied sex as long as it is discreet and infrequent; the board decided that the scene in The Duchess is more than "discreet" or "implied". The film had its world premiere on 3 September 2008, in Leicester Square and was released nationwide in the United Kingdom on 5 September.

== Reception ==
=== Critical response ===
The film received mostly positive reviews. Rotten Tomatoes gives a score of 62% based on 170 reviews, with an average rating of 6.3/10. The site's consensus reads: "While The Duchess treads the now-familiar terrain of the corset-ripper, the costumes look great and Keira Knightley's performance is stellar in this subtly feminist, period drama." Metacritic assigned the film a weighted average score of 62 out of 100, based on 34 critics, indicating "generally favorable reviews".

Most reviewers highly praised Knightley and Fiennes' performances. Time Out London wrote: "[Saul Dibb] is also helped enormously by a mature, restrained portrayal from Knightley, a masterclass in passive aggression from Fiennes and a performance of tender seduction from Atwell." Film Ireland writes "It is a slow movie, but it is well-acted with Knightley and Fiennes suited to their roles, especially Fiennes who gives a formidable and powerful performance." Cameron Bailey, the co-chair of the Toronto International Film Festival comments, "The Duchess of Devonshire, with Keira Knightley, which is a beautiful film and she gives a really mature performance. You're seeing her really turn into something beyond the kind of pretty face that we've seen her do already so well. But she's actually a very serious actress, and she's turning into a great, great performer."

Peter Bradshaw of The Guardian wrote that "Dibb's movie looks good" but complained the film was "exasperatingly bland and slow-moving at all times" handing out a 2 of 5-star rating. However, Paul Hurley gave the film 8/10 and called The Duchess "an excellent new film" and states that "The Duchess stands a good chance of taking home some very big prizes at the end of the year".

Roger Ebert gave the film 3.5 stars out of 4, writing, "I deeply enjoyed the film, but then I am an Anglophile. I imagine the behavior of the characters will seem exceedingly odd to some viewers. Well, it is."

=== Accolades ===
Awards ceremony	Award Category	Subject	Result
Academy Awards	Best Art Direction	Michael Carlin and Rebecca Alleway	Nominated
Academy Awards	Best Costume Design	Michael O'Connor	Won
British Academy Film Awards	Best Costume Design	Michael O'Connor	Won
British Academy Film Awards	Best Make-Up and Hair	Daniel Phillips and Jan Archibald	Nominated
British Independent Film Awards	Best Actress	Keira Knightley	Nominated
British Independent Film Awards	Best Supporting Actor	Ralph Fiennes	Nominated
British Independent Film Awards	Best Supporting Actress	Hayley Atwell	Nominated
British Independent Film Awards	Best Technical Achievement	Michael O'Connor (Costume)	Nominated
London Film Critics' Circle	British Actor of the Year	Ralph Fiennes	Nominated
London Film Critics' Circle	British Actress in a Supporting Role	Hayley Atwell	Nominated
Golden Globe Awards	Best Supporting Actor	Ralph Fiennes	Nominated
People's Choice Awards	Favorite Actress	Keira Knightley	Nominated
People's Choice Awards	Favorite Independent Movie	The Duchess	Nominated
Satellite Awards	Best Art Direction and Production Design	Karen Wakefield and Michael Carlin	Nominated
Satellite Awards	Best Cinematography	Gyula Pados	Nominated
Satellite Awards	Best Costume Design	Michael O'Connor	Won
