= Torsten Michaelis =

German actor (1961–2025)

Torsten Michaelis (31 January 1961 – 17 August 2025) was a German actor.

== Life and career ==
Michaelis was born in East Berlin on 31 January 1961. In 1982, he made his film debut in the three-parter Konrads Erbtanten directed by Gerald Hujer. This was followed by several smaller television roles at the DEFA and the DFF, including in the television series Der Staatsanwalt hat das Wort (1988) and Little Herr Friedemann (1990). When Germany was reunified, he appeared in the Sat.1 crime series Inspektor Rolle (2002).

In 1986, he was awarded the Erich Weinert Medal, Art Prize of the FDJ.

Michaelis died on 17 August 2025, at the age of 64.
