= In memoriam segment =

Part of a show that honors a recently deceased person

Esperanza Spalding (lower left) performing during the In Memoriam segment at the 84th Academy Awards (February 26, 2012)

An in memoriam segment is a memorial to the people, of a particular field or industry, who have recently died. Typically, such memorials air on television, mostly during awards ceremonies. The segments consist of images or video clips of the recently departed individuals, edited together into a montage and usually accompanied by music. These memorials have been featured in the Oscars, the Emmys, the Grammys, the Tonys, the Olivier Awards, the SAG Awards, BBC Sports Personality of the Year, and by the NFL during Super Bowl week. The segment is always followed by a commercial break.

== History ==
In 1978, the 50th annual ceremony for the Academy Awards (the Oscars) honored the golden anniversary of the award with a special segment featuring Sammy Davis Jr., singing the Marvin Hamlisch song, “Come Light the Candles,” over a memorial montage. It wasn't until 1994, though, that the In Memoriam segment—paying tribute to the movie stars, film crew members, and Hollywood movie executives who had died in the previous year—became an annual Oscar tribute, beginning with the 66th Academy Awards. Soon after that, the Grammys, the Emmys, and the Screen Actors Guild (SAG) Awards followed suit with their own annual memorial segments. By the beginning of the 21st century, the in memoriam tribute had become one of the most popular, and most scrutinized, segments at annual awards ceremonies. A notable editor of In Memoriam segments was Academy Award-winning filmmaker Chuck Workman.

An awards show that is known for not featuring an in memoriam segment is the ceremony for the Golden Globe Awards. In lieu of a televised memorial, the Golden Globes honors those who have recently died with a special tribute page on their official website.

== Selection process ==
Typically, for an awards show, the decision on who gets honored during the in memoriam segment lies not with the ceremony's producers, but with a committee assigned to the task of making the final decision. The committee would usually start out with a long list, featuring the names of hundreds of recently deceased individuals; from there, the committee would whittle the list down to a feasible number. Footage of all the honorees must collectively fit into a montage running no more than a few minutes in length. For the Grammys, that means honoring roughly 50 people in a span of about three minutes. For the Oscars, it usually entails fitting 40-45 tributes into a three- to four-minute film. The final montage, usually accompanied by what producer Chuck Workman called "some schmaltzy music," is typically finished several days in advance of the ceremony in which it is to be shown.

Being included in the Oscars' In Memoriam segment, does not mean the honoree was a member of the Academy of Motion Picture Arts and Sciences (AMPAS). The final decision of whether or not a person is included depends on that person's level and quality of contributions to the movie industry. According to Bruce Davis, executive director of AMPAS from 1990 to 2011, if it is doubtful that a given actor belongs in the Oscars' memorial tribute, and the actor was better known for work performed on television or Broadway, the committee would typically cut the actor in question from the Oscars’ In Memoriam montage.

Sometimes, a deceased person is given an individual tribute in lieu of, or apart from, inclusion in an in memoriam segment, depending on factors like the timing of the individual's death or the magnitude of impact the deceased person had on his or her peers in the same field or industry. In 1996, at the 68th Academy Awards, dancer Savion Glover performed a special dance to the song "Singin' in the Rain", in tribute to Gene Kelly, who had died earlier that year. The In Memoriam segment was presented later on in the ceremony.

In 2009, at the 63rd Tony Awards, actress Bebe Neuwirth presented a special tribute to Tony-winning actress Natasha Richardson, who died suddenly earlier that year following a skiing accident. Afterward, Neuwirth mentioned the death of Gerald Schoenfeld, head of Broadway's prestigious Shubert Organization, before introducing the in memoriam segment which paid tribute to the rest of Broadway's stars who had died in the previous year's time. In 2012, singer Whitney Houston died just 36 hours before the 54th Annual Grammy Awards were to take place. In response, Grammy producers decided to make major last-minute changes to the ceremony in order to allow the show's performers and presenters to pay tribute to Houston throughout the show.

In 2017, the day before the 89th Academy Awards, movie actor Bill Paxton died. He was not officially included in the Oscars' In Memoriam segment the next day, since the montage was completed before his death. However, actress Jennifer Aniston, during her presentation of the memorial montage, tearfully paid verbal tribute to Paxton before it played.

== Controversies ==
During the awards season, those working in the public relations industry might lobby for a deceased person's inclusion in a particular award show's in memoriam segment. If a certain person is excluded from the montage, it is bound to generate heated discussion afterwards. On many occasions, there has been glaring controversy over the exclusion, or inclusion, of certain people with respect to an in memoriam segment. Sometimes, the controversy focuses on the way the montage was presented.

Controversy emerged at the 82nd Academy Awards when it was discovered that Farrah Fawcett was excluded from the In Memoriam segment. Fawcett died on June 25, 2009, which was largely overshadowed in the media by reporting on the death of Michael Jackson on the same day; Jackson, who was more widely recognized for his contributions to the music industry than his film performances, was included while Fawcett was omitted. Ryan O'Neal, Roger Ebert, Jane Fonda and several other individuals in attendance expressed outrage at the decision to exclude Fawcett.

In 2011, during the 83rd Academy Awards, the In Memoriam segment neglected to include actor Corey Haim, who died on March 11, 2010, at the age of 38. Afterward, Haim's frequent movie co-star, Corey Feldman, did multiple interviews expressing his dismay over Haim's exclusion. As of March 2018, Feldman has remained angry at the Oscars, saying that it was a "travesty and a tragedy" that his fellow Corey was not part of their In Memoriam tribute.

In 2014, CBS decided that for its telecast of the 68th Tony Awards, it would not play the annual in memoriam segment on television, opting instead to let the memorial montage be shown exclusively to the live audience at Radio City Music Hall during a commercial break. This decision was backed by the ceremony's producers, but was panned by many Broadway insiders.

In 2016, at the 58th Annual Grammy Awards, Natalie Cole was featured prominently during the in memoriam segment, appearing on screen for 45 seconds at the end. After the segment played, members of her family complained that they wanted a longer tribute to Cole.

In 2017, during the 89th Academy Awards, one of the images shown as part of the In Memoriam segment was of Jan Chapman (in place of Janet Patterson), who was alive at the time of the telecast. The Academy released an apology for the error and stated the mistake was corrected on their website.

In February 2018, during the week leading up to Super Bowl LII, an in memoriam video that honored recently deceased people associated with the NFL was shown at U.S. Bank Stadium, the venue of the game; one of the honorees in the montage was Aaron Hernandez, a former professional football player who had killed himself in his prison cell ten months earlier. Hernandez was convicted, in 2014, for the murder of Odin Lloyd, though the conviction was under appeal at the time of Hernandez's death.

In April 2018, the Laurence Olivier Awards came under fire for not including Sir Peter Hall, an acclaimed British theatre director, in its in memoriam segment. To make up for this omission, the Olivier Awards renamed its Best Director trophy the "Sir Peter Hall Award for Best Director."

In September 2018, viewers of the 70th Primetime Emmy Awards were outraged when said ceremony's in memoriam segment included recently deceased politician John McCain, but not rapper Mac Miller.

In March 2025, after the 97th Academy Awards, viewers were visibly outraged when actress Michelle Trachtenberg was not included in the In Memoriam segment, as she died on February 26, 2025, four days before the ceremony. Her death was announced one day before the deaths of actor Gene Hackman and his wife Betsy Arakawa, where Hackman, unlike Trachtenberg, was included in the montage. Many viewers condemned her omission, calling it "disrespectful" and "a huge oversight", despite having a more prominent career in television than in film.

=== Response ===
The producers of In Memoriam segments frequently defend their decisions to include some but not others because they say there is not enough time in an award show to honor every single person who has recently died. As a longtime AMPAS member put it:

It's all about status. It's impossible to be fair. You try, every year, to add in a certain number of editors and art directors. It's about a person's prominence in their field, and you don't want to just go with the movie stars or the big-time directors.

Ken Ehrlich, longtime producer of the Grammy Awards, says that "there's always criticism...we start with a list of 300 worthy people. We can't do 300 worthy people. At some point, it becomes subjective." Chuck Workman, a past editor of the Oscars' memorial tribute, notes that when deciding how many people get into the montage, the audience's patience must be taken into consideration. "I don't think they want to sit for 10 minutes," says Workman. In addition to the televised In Memoriam segment, the Oscars features on its website a much longer obituary montage with many more names listed.

== See also ==
- Turner Classic Movies - known for their year-end In Memoriam segments, TCM Remembers
- Collage film
