= Endlich Samstag! =

- Country of origin: Germany

Endlich Samstag! is a German television series.

== See also ==
- List of German television series
