= Matthias Paul (actor) =

German actor, singer, and director

Matthias Paul (born 15 July 1964 in Frankfurt (Oder)) is a German actor, singer and director.

== Life and career ==
Matthias Paul has been living in Berlin since 1972. After school, he completed an apprenticeship as an aircraft mechanic at Berlin-Schönefeld Airport. Later he went to the television of the GDR and worked as the first camera assistant. From 1987 to 1991 he studied at the Ernst Busch Academy of Dramatic Arts, Berlin. In 1996, he attended the Actors Workshop with Eric Morris in Los Angeles.

Paul works as an actor and presenter. He also speaks audiobooks and was on stage as a singer of chansons and love ballads. In 1999, he played a major role in the action series "Die Motorrad-Cops – Hart am Limit".

Since 2009 he works as a director for television, increasingly for soap operas, and has directed some 300 episodes (up to 2019).

He is married since September 2006, lives in Pritzwalk and Berlin and has 3 children.

== Theatre ==
- 1994: Romeo & Julia (Kleist-Theater Frankfurt (Oder))
- 1993: Michael Kohlhaas (Kleist-Theater Frankfurt (Oder))
- 1993: Hase Hase (Kleist-Theater Frankfurt (Oder))
- 1993: Exekutor 14 (Kleist-Theater Frankfurt (Oder))
- 1992: Leonce & Lena (Theater Kampnagel Hamburg)
- 1992: Der Cassernower (Kleine Bühne Das Ei at Friedrichstadt-Palast Berlin)
- 1992: Penthesilea (Kleist-Theater Frankfurt (Oder))
- 1992: Frühlingserwachen (Berliner Kammerspiele)
- 1991: Das Wintermärchen (Schaubühne am Lehniner Platz Berlin)
- 1989: Der Lohndrücker (Deutsches Theater Berlin)

== Filmography ==
=== Actor ===
- 1991: Bronstein's Children
- 1992: Zorc-Tim
- 1993: Fahrschule Kampmann
- 1994: Feuerbach
- 1995: Coeur pour coeur, dent pour dent
- 1995: Les Alsaciens/Die Elsässer
- 1995: Eine Frau wird gejagt
- 1995: Kinder der Nacht
- 1996: Boom Baby Boom
- 1996: Gone Wrong
- 1996: Hollister
- 1997: Die Geliebte (television series): Jedes Ende ist ein neuer Anfang
- 1997: Lisa Falk, Anwältin
- 1997: Ritter der Lüfte
- 1998: Einfach Klasse…
- 1998: Medicopter 117 – Jedes Leben zählt (television series): Der Kronzeuge
- 1998: SK-Babies (television series): Der Ausbrecher
- 1999–2000: Die Motorrad-Cops – Hart am Limit (television series, 23 episodes)
- 1999: In aller Freundschaft (television series, 5 episodes, cast)
- 1999–2002: Alarm für Cobra 11 – Die Autobahnpolizei (television series, 3 episodes, including Vater und Sohn)
- 2003: Der Zauberstein
- 2003: Ei verbibbsch
- 2003: Die Rosenheim-Cops (television series): Die sündige Sennerin
- 2004: Das Kommando
- 2004: Sabine! (television series, 7 episodes)
- 2004: Sharia-Gods Law
- 2004: Siska (television series): Zuerst kommt die Angst
- 2006–2007: Schmetterlinge im Bauch (soap, 82 episodes)
- 2007: Spielzeugland
- 2007–2008: Rote Rosen (soap, 16 episodes, cast)
- 2008–2009: Rosamunde Pilcher: Entscheidung des Herzens (series, 6 episodes)
- 2010–2011: Schloss Einstein (television series, 53 episodes, cast)
- 2014–2015: Große Fische, kleine Fische
- 2015: Nord bei Nordwest: Der wilde Sven
- 2017: Professor T.: Der perfekte Mord
- 2017: Das Joshua-Profil
- 2017–2018: Tatort: Die robuste Roswita
- 2018: Happiness is a warm gun (short film)

=== Director ===
- 1998: The Real Psycho (short film)
- 1997: Schrei leise (short film)
- 2009: Gute Zeiten, schlechte Zeiten (soap, RTL)
- 2009–2010: Verbotene Liebe (soap, ARD)
- 2010–2011: Anna und die Liebe (soap, Sat.1, 14 episodes)
- 2010–2013: Alles was zählt (soap, RTL, 107 episodes)
