= Severance (film) =

- Theatrical release poster
- Directed by: Christopher Smith
- Screenplay by: James Moran; Christopher Smith
- Story by: James Moran
- Produced by: Jason Newmark; Finola Dwyer
- Starring: Danny Dyer; Laura Harris; Tim McInnerny; Toby Stephens; Claudie Blakley; Andy Nyman; Babou Ceesay
- Cinematography: Ed Wild
- Edited by: Stuart Gazzard
- Music by: Christian Henson
- Production companies: Qwerty Films; UK Film Council; Isle of Man Film; N1 European Film Produktions GmbH & Co. KG; Dan Films; HanWay Films; Wildgaze Films
- Distributed by: Pathé Distribution (United Kingdom); Splendid Film (Germany)
- Release dates: 25 August 2006 (United Kingdom); 30 November 2006 (Germany)
- Running time: 96 minutes
- Countries: United Kingdom; Germany
- Language: English
- Budget: $10 million
- Box office: $5.9 million

Severance is a 2006 comedy horror film co-written and directed by Christopher Smith. Co-written with James Moran, it stars Danny Dyer and Laura Harris. The film tells the story of a group of British and Canadian co-workers who go to a remote mountain forest in Hungary, where they become victims of murderous attacks by a group of poachers.

Severance received mostly positive reviews. In 2009, media interest in the film was revived following the alleged copycat murder of a UK teenager.

== Plot ==
The European Sales division of Palisade Defence military arms corporation are en route to a team-building weekend at a lodge in the Mátra Mountains of Hungary. When a fallen tree blocking the road halts their bus's progress, the driver refuses to take a dirt road through the woods and, after an argument, drives off, leaving the group to walk the remaining distance to the lodge.

The lodge is old and in disrepair, but the manager, Richard, convinces them to enter. Inside, they discover a filing cabinet full of Palisade documents written in Russian. This leads Harris to relate something he heard: the lodge was a mental institution, and in the early 20th century a Palisade-made nerve gas was used to clear it out after the inmates took over. Jill heard something different: the lodge was a "reeducation center" for Russian war criminals and poachers, and after an escape, a Palisade-made nerve gas was used to clear escapees out of nearby buildings. Both mention a lone survivor who swore revenge on Palisade. Steve starts to tell his own story about the lodge's past as a clinic for rich elderly men, when he finds a human tooth in the meat pie the group is eating for dinner. After chastising Gordon for serving them a pie he found in the kitchen, everyone goes to bed.

That night, Jill sees someone looking into the lodge from the trees. Though nobody is found outside, everyone but Richard agrees that they should leave the lodge. The next morning Richard sends Harris and Jill to the top of the hill to call the driver back, but upon reaching the hill, the two find the bus abandoned and the driver's brutally slain corpse in a nearby creek. At the lodge, Gordon steps into a bear trap. After failed attempts by Steve and Billy to pry the trap open, Gordon's left leg is completely severed. Harris and Jill arrive in the bus, load everyone in and head back to town. On the way, a spike strip is thrown in front of the bus, which causes it to crash. Harris is thrown clear off the bus and is decapitated by a masked killer with a machete. Jill is tied to a tree, doused with petrol, and burned alive. The rest of the group discover Harris's body and return to the lodge for the night, where they barricade themselves into the cellar.

Maggie and Steve tend to a gravely injured Gordon, with the latter giving him Ecstacy to help with the pain. While Maggie and Steve are discussing the best way to ensure everyone's survival, a barely conscious Gordon is dragged away by a masked intruder. Discovering a newly opened door, the remaining four enter a sub-basement, which leads to an underground prison. Through one door, they find the now-dead Gordon with the Palisade logo carved into his torso along with one of the killers, who fires a shotgun at them. Steve and Richard flee, but Maggie and Billy hide in a cell, where Billy dies from a gunshot wound to the chest. A distraught and vengeful Maggie arms herself with the killer's machete and heads back upstairs. While trying to evade the killer, Maggie falls through the damaged upstairs hallways floor. After the killer falls through the hole in the floor and gets stuck, Maggie retrieves his gun and shoots him in the head.

Believing they are safe, Maggie and Steve exit the lodge, but discover five more armed, Russian-speaking killers awaiting them outside. The two run into the woods and encounter Richard, who ran into the woods and accidentally stepped on a Palisade-made land mine which he cannot step off without detonating it. Richard guides Maggie and Steve through the minefield. Meanwhile, the killers use a fallen branch to pass over the minefield and torment Richard with insults and stones. Accepting his situation, Richard steps off the mine, killing himself as well as two killers.

Steve and Maggie come to another building, the real Palisade lodge. Inside, they find their boss George, who is partying with two escorts Steve ordered earlier. George brings out a prototype missile launcher and fires it at the approaching killers, but the missile locks on to a passing commercial jet instead, destroying it. The five run into the woods, where George is the next to be killed.

Maggie and Steve are left to fight the killers with what they have at hand, becoming separated. Maggie is captured by one of the killers who tries to rape her but she overpowers him and smashes his head with rock, while after a struggle, Steve is able to kill two more. Maggie ends up in what appears to be an abandoned military complex, where she is cornered by the last killer, who is armed with a flamethrower. She breaks her leg running away from him but is saved when Steve and the two escorts arrive, one of whom shoots their attacker. Steve, Maggie and the escorts make it to a rowboat, and paddle off to safety.

== Cast ==
- Laura Harris as Maggie
- Claudie Blakley as Jill
- Toby Stephens as Harris
- Andy Nyman as Gordon
- Babou Ceesay as Billy
- Tim McInnerny as Richard
- Danny Dyer as Steve
- David Gilliam as George
- Juli Drajkó as Olga
- Judit Viktor as Nadia
- Sándor Boros as Coach Driver

== Release ==
=== Home video ===
Severance was released in the United Kingdom on DVD by 20th Century Fox Home Entertainment on 8 January 2007. In the United States it was released on DVD by Magnolia Pictures on 27 September 2007. Severance has also been released on DVD in Australia by Warner Home Video, in France by Fox Pathé Europa, in Germany by Splendid Film and in Hong Kong by Deltamac.

== Reception ==
Severance received generally favorable reviews. The film holds an approval rating of 66% on the film critic site Rotten Tomatoes based on 91 reviews, with an average rating of 6.2/10. The consensus reads: "A twisted and bloody spoof on office life, Severance nicely balances comedy and nasty horror." On Metacritic, the film holds a score of 62 out of 100 sampled from 23 critics' reviews, indicating "generally favorable reviews".

Peter Travers of Rolling Stone commended Smith's "mischievous blending [of] The Office with Friday the 13th", awarding the film three stars out of four. Peter Bradshaw of The Guardian gave not such a positive review, saying, "It is being billed as Deliverance meets The Office – a tellingly misleading description," giving the film only two out of five stars. In 2012, Total Film ranked it as the 36th best independent horror film of all time.

== Connections ==
Mentioned in the film, the CRM-114 land mine is a reference to the CRM-114 radio discriminator in Dr. Strangelove. Severance and Dr. Strangelove both end with the song "We'll Meet Again".

On 28 April 2009, the BBC reported that the murder of a 17-year-old student from Norfolk was allegedly based on a scene from the film. According to the BBC news report, "Norwich Crown Court was told how Simon Everitt, from Great Yarmouth, was tied up and petrol poured down his throat before he was set on fire. Simon's body was found in woodland at Mautby in June 2008." Jurors at the trial of Jonathan Clarke and two other co-defendants were played a scene from Severance and told that, when Mr. Clarke had watched the DVD, "he made a comment to this effect: 'Wouldn't it be wicked if you could actually do that to someone in real life?'" On 29 May 2009, the trio were convicted of Everitt's murder.

== See also ==
- Deliverance
- Survival film, about the film genre, with a list of related films
