= Marc Elsberg =

Austrian author

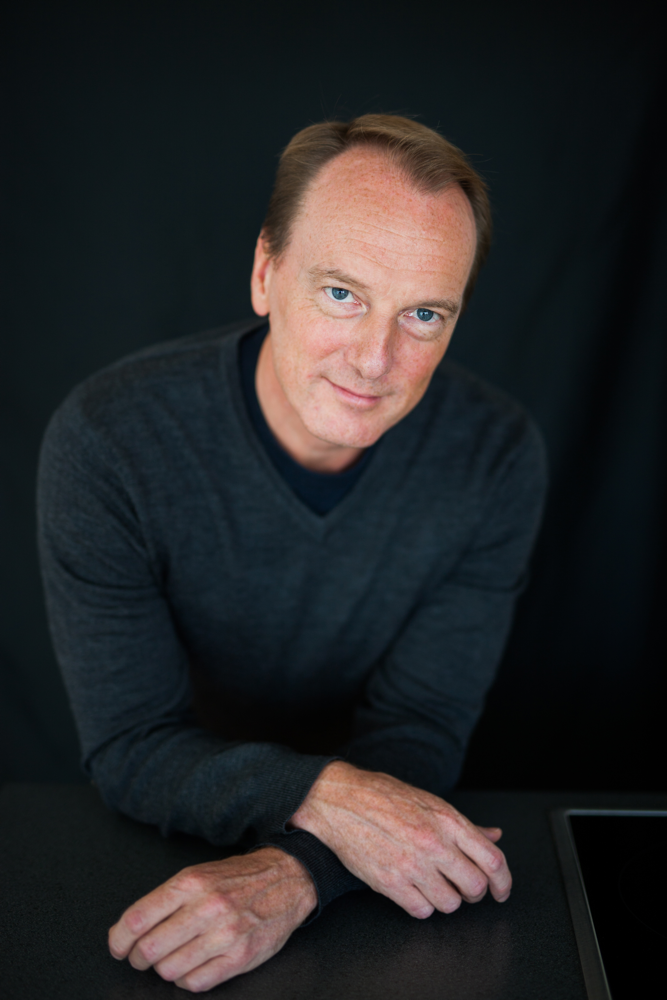
- Marcus Rafelsberger (2016)
- Born: 3 January 1967; Vienna, Austria
- Education: University of Applied Arts Vienna
- Occupation: Novelist
- Writing career
- Period: since 2000
- Genres: satirical novel; crime novel; popular science

Marc Elsberg (born 3 January 1967, in Vienna, real name Marcus Rafelsberger) is an Austrian author. His works have been published by Blanvalet Verlag of the Penguin Random House publishing group since 2012. They have been translated into numerous languages and made into a series and a film.

== Life and education ==
Marc Elsberg was born in Vienna in 1967. After graduating in 1985, he began studying industrial design at the University of Applied Arts Vienna. Elsberg worked as a strategy consultant and creative director in the advertising industry, among others in Vienna and Hamburg agencies. He received awards for his work from the Creative Club Austria, among others. At the same time, he began to create a column for the Austrian daily newspaper Der Standard under the title "No ad by Marcus Rafelsberger". Since 2021, Marc Elsberg has been teaching "Storytelling" at the University of Applied Arts Vienna as a university lecturer.

== Career ==
Marc Elsberg made his literary debut in 2000, still under his civil name Marcus Rafelsberger, with the satirical novel Saubermann (Mr. Clean) published by Espresso-Verlag in Berlin, about a detergent's fictional advertising character becoming president. In 2004, Emons Verlag in Cologne published Das Prinzip Terz a crime novel in which the eponymous detective must solve the death of the head of an advertising agency while becoming a murderer himself. Other works under his civil name were Menschenteufel (2009) and Wienerherz (2011).

In 2012, Elsberg achieved greater fame with the thriller Blackout – Tomorrow will be too late with the scenario of a widespread collapse of the power supply and its consequences. The book was predominantly positively reviewed; among other things the Handelsblatt called it a "grippingly narrated thriller". Bild der Wissenschaft judged that the plot was "well researched and realistically portrayed". In 2013, it was among the iBookstore's "10 books you have to read this summer", and Blackout was also on Spiegel's bestseller list for several years. At its peak, the book reached second place there in July 2013. The novel has sold over 1.8 million copies in German-speaking countries alone. It has been translated into over a dozen languages. Also, Blackout received Germany's 2012 Wissensbuch des Jahres award in the entertainment category. This is awarded by a jury of renowned science journalists on the initiative of Bild der Wissenschaft. The book was filmed for a television series by Joyn/Sat.1 starring Moritz Bleibtreu.

In 2014 Elsberg's sixth novel entitled Zero – Sie wissen, was du tust was published, dealing with Big data and data protection. The title reached second place on the Spiegel bestseller list. and was named Science Book of the Year in the "Entertainment" category. Elsberg was the first author to receive the award twice. The Guardian called it "a thriller with its finger on the zeitgeist". WDR secured the rights for its film adaptation. Heike Makatsch played the leading role. In 2016, the seventh novel, titled Helix – Sie werden uns ersetzen, was published dealing with the subject of genetics. It is an "exciting and educational scientific thriller" that combines scientific details with ethical issues. This work also became a bestseller. There are translated editions of Helix as well.

In 2019, his eighth novel Gier – Wie weit würdest du gehen? was published, in which Elsberg dealt with economic concepts, findings, and theories and the consideration of whether comprehensive cooperation between economic partners and economic sectors would lead to broader prosperity. He drew on scientific work on ergodicity economics by a group led by Ole Peters at the London Mathematical Laboratory, supported by Nobel laureates Murray Gell-Mann and Ken Arrow, among others (afterword). "Greed" reached third place on Spiegel's bestseller list.

== Works ==
=== as Marcus Rafelsberger ===
- Saubermann, Berlin: Espresso, 2000, ISBN 3-88520-781-8
- Das Prinzip Terz / Kommissar Terz' erster Fall, Köln: Emons, 2004, ISBN 3-89705-351-9
- Menschenteufel, Köln: Emons, 2009, ISBN 978-3-89705-668-8
- Wienerherz, Köln: Emons, 2011, ISBN 978-3-89705-839-2

=== as Marc Elsberg ===
- Blackout – Morgen ist es zu spät, München: Blanvalet, 2012, ISBN 978-3-7645-0445-8
- Zero – Sie wissen, was du tust, München: Blanvalet, 2014, ISBN 978-3-7645-0492-2
- Helix – Sie werden uns ersetzen, München: Blanvalet, 2016, ISBN 978-3-7645-0564-6
- Gier – Wie weit würdest du gehen?, München: Blanvalet, 2019, ISBN 978-3-7645-0632-2
  - Greed. Black Swan, 2020. ISBN 9781784163471
- Der Fall des Präsidenten, München: Blanvalet, 2021, ISBN 978-3-7645-1047-3
- °C - Celsius, München: Blanvalet, 2023, ISBN 978-3-7645-0633-9
