= Adaptations of Jane Eyre =

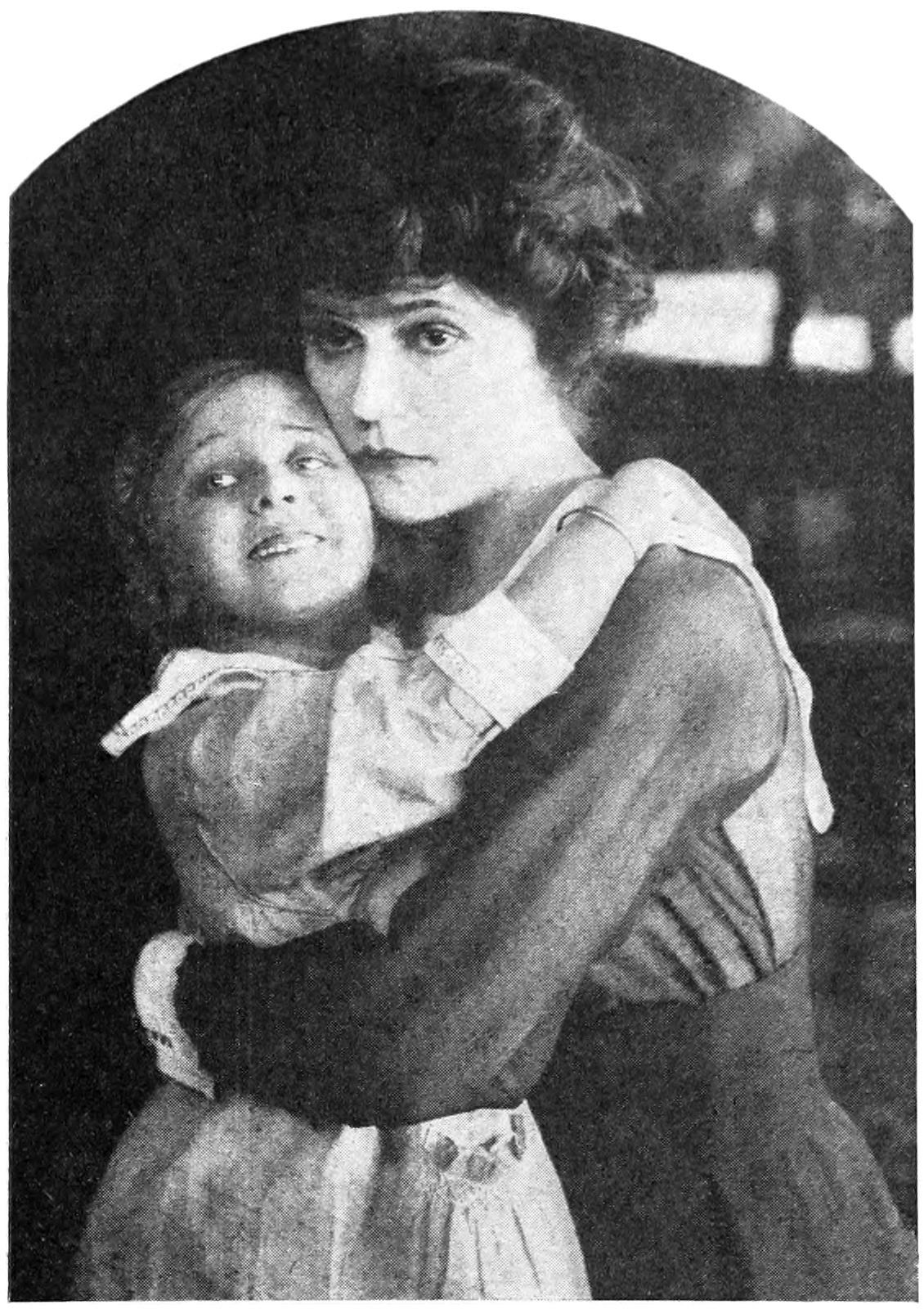
Alice Brady as Jane Eyre in Woman and Wife (1918)

Jane Eyre, the 1847 novel by English writer Charlotte Brontë, has frequently been adapted for film, radio, television, and theatre, and has also inspired a number of rewritings and reinterpretations.

== Film ==
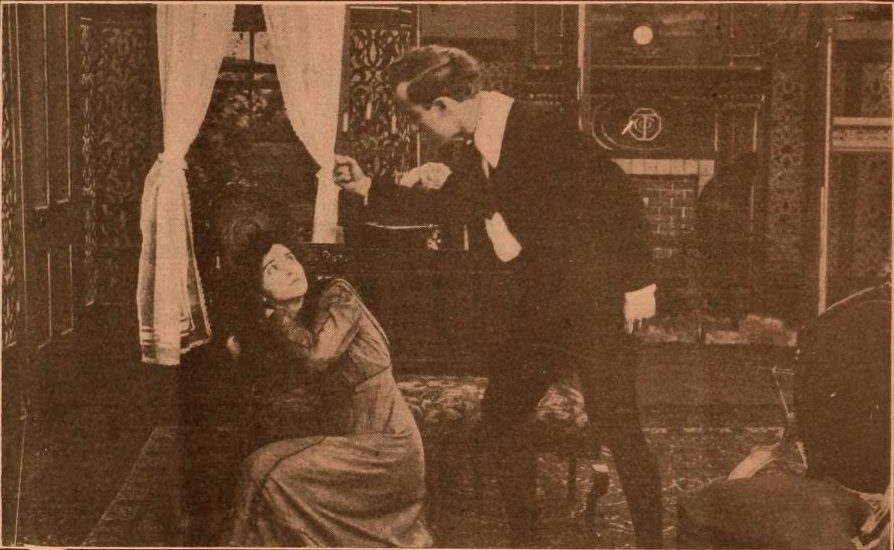
Irma Taylor as Jane and Charles Compton as John Reed in the Thanhouser Company's Jane Eyre (1910)

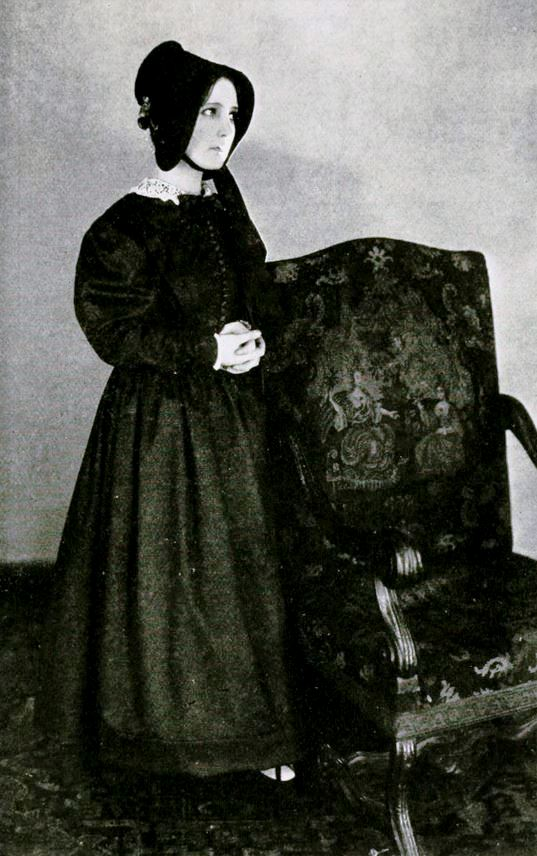
Mabel Ballin in Jane Eyre (1921), directed by Hugo Ballin

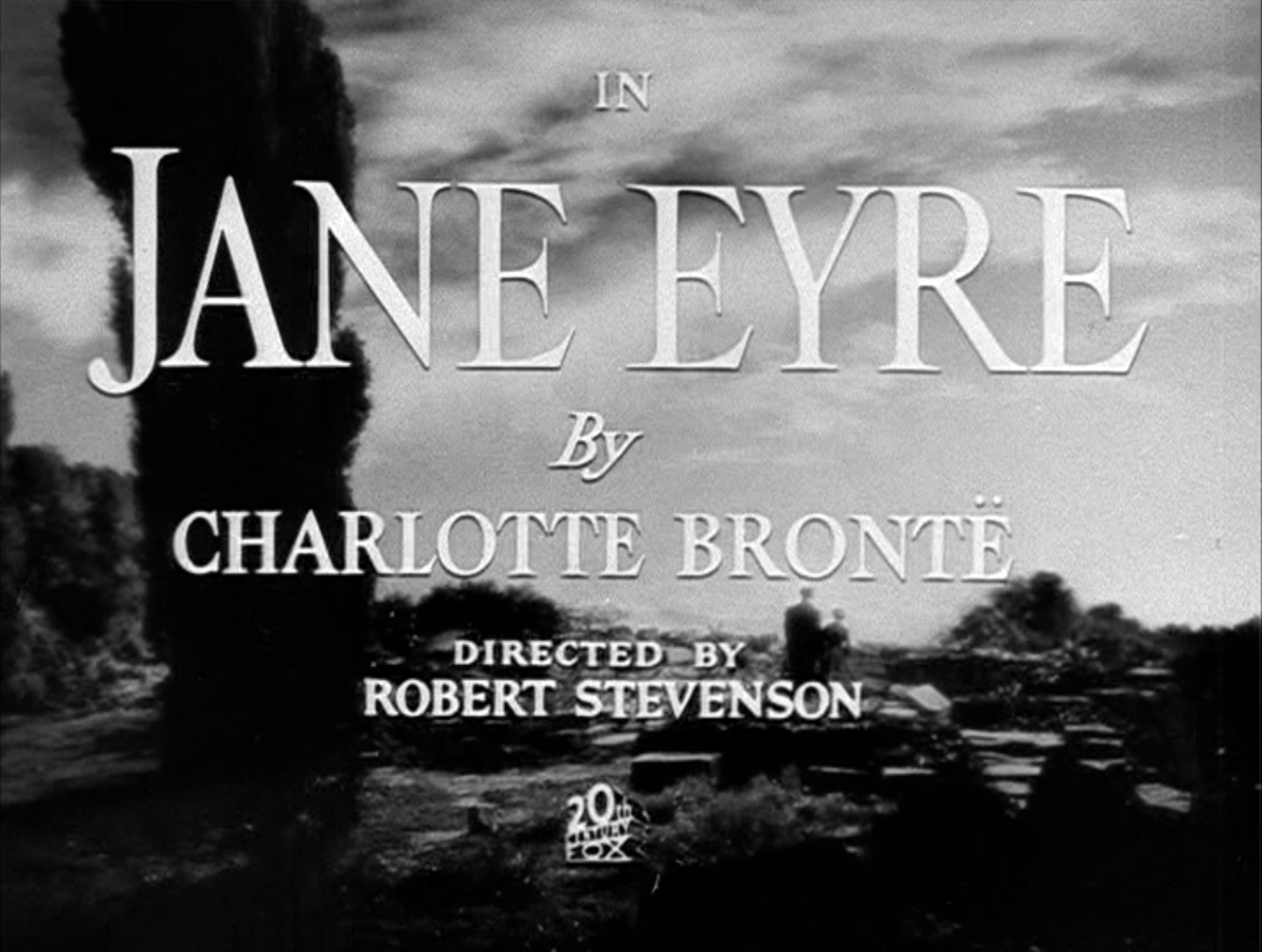
Orson Welles and Joan Fontaine in Jane Eyre (1943), directed by Robert Stevenson

=== Silent films ===
- 1910: Jane Eyre, starring Irma Taylor (Jane), Marie Eline (Young Jane), and Frank Hall Crane (Rochester)
- 1914: Jane Eyre, starring Lisbeth Blackstone, Dallas Tyler, Harrish Ingraham, and John Charles
- 1914: Jane Eyre, directed by Frank Hall Crane, starring Ethel Grandin (Jane) and Irving Cummings (Rochester)
- 1915: Jane Eyre, starring Louise Vale
- 1915: The Castle of Thornfield, produced in Italy
- 1918: Woman and Wife, adapted by Paul West, directed by Edward José, starring Alice Brady
- 1921: Jane Eyre, directed by Hugo Ballin, starring Norman Trevor and Mabel Ballin
- 1926: Orphan of Lowood, produced in Germany, directed by Curtis Bernhardt

=== Sound films ===
- 1934: Jane Eyre, starring Colin Clive and Virginia Bruce
- 1943: I Walked with a Zombie, a Val Lewton horror movie loosely based on Jane Eyre, starring Tom Conway and Frances Dee
- 1943: Jane Eyre, screenplay by John Houseman and Aldous Huxley, starring Orson Welles (Rochester), Joan Fontaine (Jane), Agnes Moorehead (Mrs. Reed), Margaret O'Brien (Adele), Peggy Ann Garner (Young Jane), and Elizabeth Taylor (Helen Burns).
  Fontaine also starred in Alfred Hitchcock's 1940 film Rebecca, based upon the Daphne du Maurier novel influenced by Jane Eyre.
- 1952: Sangdil (also known as Jane Eyre), an Indian Hindi-language version directed by R. C. Talwar, starring Madhubala.
- 1956: The Orphan Girl, from Hong Kong
- 1962: The Man I Love, from Egypt, directed by Hussein Hilmy El Mohandes and starring Magda al Sabahi and Yehia Chahine
- 1963: El Secreto (English: "The Secret"), released in Mexico
- 1968: Bedi Bandavalu, Indian Kannada-language film adaptation directed by C. Srinivasan, starring Chandrakala and Kalyan Kumar in the lead roles.
- 1970: Jane Eyre, starring George C. Scott and Susannah York; released in theatres in Europe but direct-to-TV in the U.S. in 1971
- 1972: Shanti Nilayam, an Indian adaptation in Tamil directed by G.S. Mani, starring Kanchana
- 1972: Shanti Nilayam, an Indian adaptation in Telugu directed by C. Vaikuntarama Sastry, starring Anjali Devi
- 1996: Jane Eyre, directed by Franco Zeffirelli, starring William Hurt (Rochester), Charlotte Gainsbourg (Jane), Elle Macpherson (Blanche Ingram), Joan Plowright (Mrs. Fairfax), Anna Paquin (Young Jane), Fiona Shaw (Mrs. Reed), and Geraldine Chaplin (Miss Scatcherd)
- 1997: Jane Eyre, directed by Robert Young, starring Ciarán Hinds and Samantha Morton
- 2011: Jane Eyre, directed by Cary Fukunaga, starring Mia Wasikowska (Jane), Michael Fassbender (Rochester), and Judi Dench (Mrs. Fairfax)

== Radio ==
A 1949 adaptation for NBC University Theatre, starring Deborah Kerr

- 1938: The Mercury Theatre on the Air, 18 September 1938, with Orson Welles and music by Bernard Herrmann; the acetate recording was irreparably damaged by its use in preparing the 1943 motion picture
- 1940: The Campbell Playhouse, 31 March 1940, with Orson Welles and Madeleine Carroll
- 1941: The Screen Guild Theater, 2 March 1941, with Brian Aherne and Bette Davis
- 1943: The Weird Circle, 26 December 1943, in a half-hour adaptation using almost none of the novel's original dialogue and with no cast credits
- 1944: The Philco Radio Hall of Fame, 13 February 1944, an "impression" by Joan Fontaine (20:40–32:20)
- 1944: The Lux Radio Theatre, 5 June 1944, with Orson Welles and Loretta Young
- 1944: Matinee Theater, 3 December 1944, with Victor Jory and Gertrude Warner
- 1946: The Mercury Summer Theatre of the Air, 28 June 1946, adapted by Norman Corwin, with Orson Welles and Alice Frost
- 1948: The Lux Radio Theatre, 14 June 1948, with Ingrid Bergman and Robert Montgomery
- 1949: NBC University Theatre
- 1994: Jane Eyre, British radio, January 1994, with Sophie Thompson and Ciarán Hinds
- 1994 "BBC Radio Presents Jane Eyre" (Abridged) AudioBook (4 audiocassettes); ISBN 978-0-553-47397-1; Running Time: 240 minutes; Performance by Juliet Stevenson; Bantam Doubleday Dell; BBC Enterprises;
- 2009: Jane Eyre, British radio, August 2009
- 2016: Jane Eyre, BBC Radio 4 as ten 15-minute episodes, from 29 February 2016, with Amanda Hale and Tom Burke

== Television ==
- 1949: Studio One in Hollywood – Jane Eyre, 12 December 1949, with Charlton Heston and Mary Sinclair
- 1952: Studio One in Hollywood – Jane Eyre, 4 August 1952, with Kevin McCarthy and Katharine Bard
- 1956: Jane Eyre, a BBC series starring Stanley Baker and Daphne Slater
- 1957: Jane Eyre, an NBC Matinee Theatre production starring Patrick Macnee and Joan Elan
- 1957: Jane Eyre, an Italian television miniseries starring Raf Vallone and Ilaria Occhini
- 1961: Jane Eyre, a TV movie directed by Marc Daniels starring Sally Ann Howes and Zachary Scott
- 1963: Jane Eyre, a BBC series starring Richard Leech and Ann Bell.
- 1970: Jane Eyre, starring George C. Scott and Susannah York; direct-to-TV in the U.S. but given theatrical release in Europe (also listed above)
- 1971: Jane Eyre, part of Novela (TVE), starring María Luisa Merlo as Jane and Rafael Arcos as Rochester, there are 15 episodes total with a run time of 372min total.
- 1972: Jana Eyrová, produced by Czechoslovak television, starring Marta Vančurová (Jane) and Jan Kačer (Rochester)
- 1973: Jane Eyre, a BBC series starring Sorcha Cusack (Jane), Michael Jayston (Rochester), Juliet Waley (Young Jane), and Tina Heath (Helen Burns); much of the dialogue is taken directly from the original novel
- 1978: Telenovela – Ardiente secreto (English: The Impassioned Secret), a 20-part serial novel broadcast in Mexico
- 1982: BBC Classics Presents: Jane Eyrehead, a parody by SCTV starring Andrea Martin (Jane Eyrehead), Joe Flaherty (Rochester), John Candy, Eugene Levy and Martin Short
- 1983: Jane Eyre, a BBC series starring Zelah Clarke (Jane), Timothy Dalton (Rochester), Sian Pattenden (Young Jane) and Colette Barker (Helen Burns), directed by Julian Charles Becket Amyes
- 1995: Persistence of Vision (Star Trek: Voyager)
- 1996: Ruk Diow Kong Jenjira, a Thai TV drama on Channel 3, starring Willie McIntosh and Sirilak Pongchoke.
- 1997: Jane Eyre, an ITV film starring Ciarán Hinds and Samantha Morton
- 2006: Jane Eyre, a BBC series starring Ruth Wilson (Jane), Georgie Henley (Young Jane), and Toby Stephens (Rochester)
- 2007: Kula Kumariya, a Sri Lankan teledrama screened on Swarnavahini, directed by Bermin Lylie Fernando, starring Ravindra Randeniya (Mr. Edward Daraniyagala) and Anarkali Akarsha (Suwimali)
- 2027: Jane Eyre, a television series written by Miriam Battye and produced by Working Title Films, starring Aimee Lou Wood as Jane Eyre.

== Theatre ==
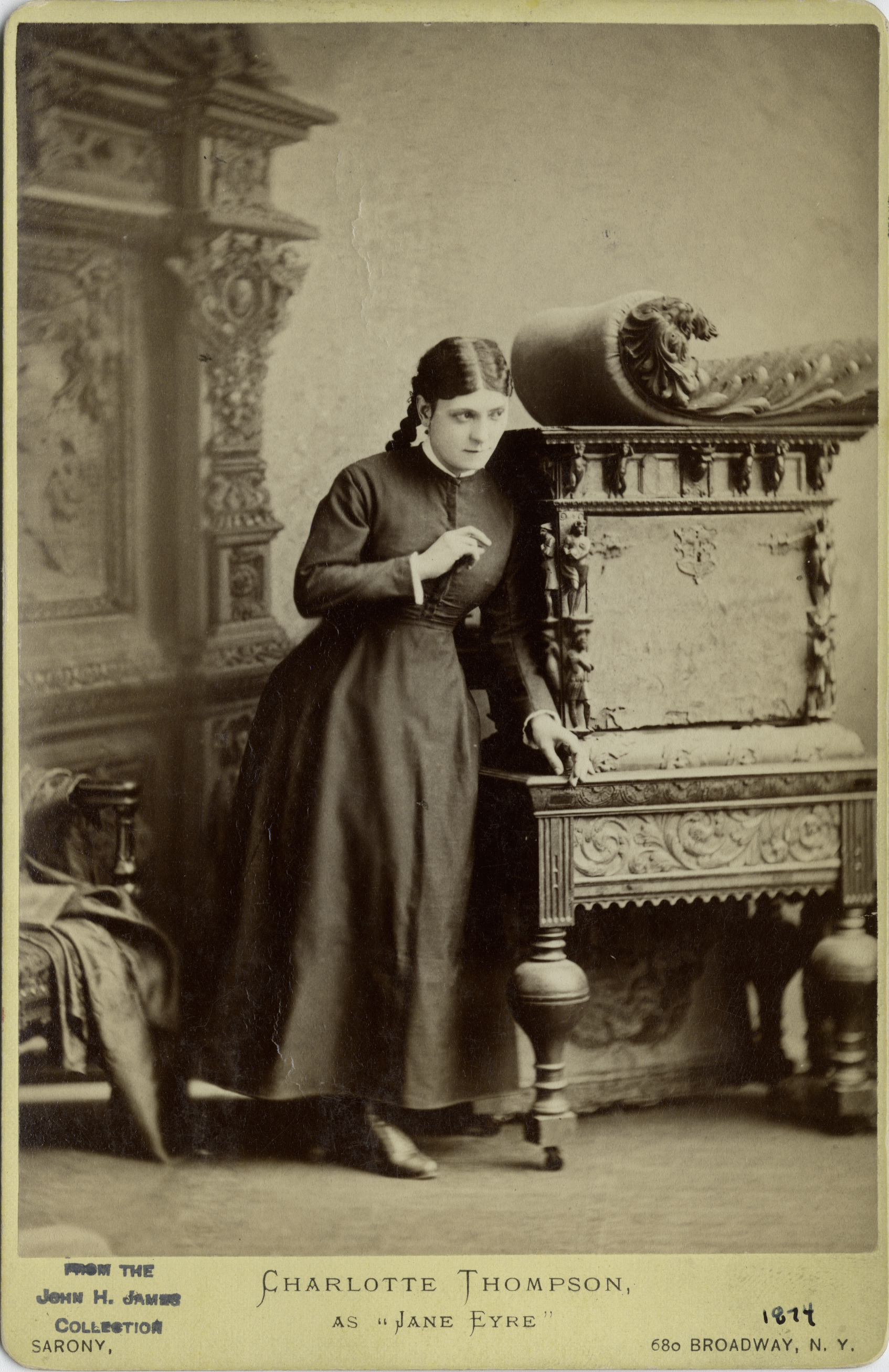
Charlotte Thompson in Charlotte Birch-Pfeiffer's stage adaptation of Jane Eyre (1874)

- 1849: Jane Eyre, a drama in five acts by John Brougham
- 1870: Jane Eyre, or The Orphan of Lowood by Charlotte Birch-Pfeiffer
- 1879: Poor Relations by James Willing.
- 1958: Jane Eyre, a drama in three acts and five scenes adapted by Huntington Hartford and performed at the Belasco Theatre on Broadway (1 May 1958 – 14 Jun 1958), starring Eric Portman as Mr. Rochester. In 1959 the production was nominated for a Tony Award for Best Scenic Design by Ben Edwards.
- 1994: A two-act ballet of Jane Eyre was created for the first time by the London Children's Ballet in 1994, with an original score by composer Julia Gomelskaya and choreography by Polyanna Buckingham.
- 1997: Jane Eyre, an opera in three acts, Op. 134, was composed by John Joubert in 1987–1997 to a libretto by Kenneth Birkin after the novel. The world premiere of a revised version took place at Ruddock Performing Arts Centre in Birmingham (England) on 25 October 2016, with April Fredrick (soprano) as Jane and David Stout (baritone) as Rochester. The performance was later released on CD by SOMM Recordings. It received a fully staged premiere at the Arcola Theatre in London in 2025.
- 1998: A musical version with music by Michael Malthaner, lyrics by Charles Corritore, and book by David Matthews, was written and produced in 1998. The world premiere was in Toronto, Canada, with Marla Schaffel as Jane and Anthony Crivello as Rochester.
- 2000: Jane Eyre, a musical version with a book by John Caird and music and lyrics by Paul Gordon, with Marla Schaffel as Jane and James Stacy Barbour as Mr. Rochester, ran at the Brooks Atkinson Theatre from 10 December 2000 through 10 June 2001.
- 2000: Jane Eyre, an opera based on the novel, was written in 2000 by English composer Michael Berkeley, with a libretto by David Malouf. It was given its premiere by Music Theatre Wales at the Cheltenham Festival.
- 2004: Jane Eyre, an Odd Socks Production, written and performed in 2004. It was shared on YouTube in 2020 to support the theatre while it was closed.
- 2006 Charlotte Brontë's Jane Eyre, adapted by Polly Teale. Company - Shared Experience performed at the Trafalgar Studios.
- 2007: The ballet Jane, based on the book, was created in 2007, a Bullard/Tye production with music by Max Reger. Its world premiere was scheduled at the Civic Auditorium, Kalamazoo, Michigan, 29 and 30 June, performed by the Kalamazoo Ballet Company, Therese Bullard, Director.
- 2008: A musical production directed by Debby Race, book by Jana Smith and Wayne R. Scott, with a musical score by Jana Smith and Brad Roseborough, premiered in 2008 at the Lifehouse Theatre in Redlands, California
- 2009: A symphony (7th) by Michel Bosc premiered in Bandol (France), 11 October 2009.
- 2013: A one-act musical farce version of Jane Eyre by Gerald P. Murphy was published by Lazy Bee Scripts in 2013 Jane Eyre - A One Act, Musical Farce by Gerald P. Murphy
- 2013: The Autobiography of Jane Eyre, an ongoing modernized web series adaptation. It was created by Nessa Aref and Alysson Hall, produced by Nessa Aref and Erika Babins, and stars Alysson Hall as Jane.
- 2014: A new stage adaptation directed by Sally Cookson was devised by the company at the Bristol Old Vic as two-parts. The production opened as a one-part play in the Lyttleton Theatre at the National Theatre, London (in a co-production with Bristol Old Vic) in 2015 before touring to Bristol Old Vic, Nottingham Theatre Royal, Hong Kong Arts Festival and touring the rest of the UK in 2017, ending with another run at the National Theatre.
- 2016: A new ballet adaptation from Northern Ballet choreographed by Cathy Marston with a score by Philip Feeney premiered in the UK at the Cast Theatre in Doncaster, England with Dreda Blow as Jane and Javier Torres as Rochester. In 2017 the production was nominated for the South Bank Sky Arts Award for Dance, and Northern Ballet announced the ballet will be revived in 2018 to venues including Leeds Grand Theatre, The Lowry, and Sadler's Wells.
- 2016: Jane Eyre, a 2016 opera by Louis Karchin
- 2020: Dramatic adaptation by Elizabeth Williamson. The Oregon Shakespeare Festival produced it during their 2024 season; this was its west coast premiere.

== Works inspired by the novel ==
=== Literature ===
==== Sequels ====
- The novelist Angela Carter was working on a sequel to Jane Eyre at the time of her death in 1992. This was to have been the story of Jane's stepdaughter Adèle Varens and her mother Céline. Only a synopsis survives.
- 1997: Mrs. Rochester: A Sequel to Jane Eyre by Hilary Bailey
- 2003: Jane Eyre: The Graphic Novel. Script Adaptation: Amy Corzine; Artwork: John M. Burns; Lettering: Terry Wiley; Classical Comics Ltd.

==== Re-workings ====
- 1958: Nine Coaches Waiting by Mary Stewart makes implicit and explicit reference to Jane Eyre. The novel is a gothic romance set in a remote French château in the 1950s. The heroine, Linda, is, like Jane, an orphan who takes on the role of governess, this time to a young boy. She compares her situation to that of Jane Eyre on several occasions.
- 2002: Jenna Starborn by Sharon Shinn, a science-fiction novel based upon Jane Eyre
- 2010: Jane Slayre by Sherri Browning Erwin. In the same vein as Pride and Prejudice and Zombies, this has Jane Eyre battling vampires while also working through the events of the original story.
- 2010 Sloane Hall by Libby Sternberg, a retelling set in 1929 Hollywood as films shifted from silent to sound. ISBN 9781594149177
- 2010: Jane by April Lindner. Set in the 20th century with Mr. Rochester as Nico Rathburn, a world-famous rockstar
- 2015: Re Jane: A Novel by Patricia Park pictures Jane as a half-Korean, half-American orphan in Flushing, Queens.
- 2016: Jane Steele by Lyndsay Faye; inspired by her reading of Jane Eyre, the titular protagonist tells her story, which follows a similar path to the original, but this Jane is a serial killer.
- 2016: A manga adaptation by Crystal S. Chan was published by Manga Classics Inc., with artwork by Sunneko Lee.
- 2017: Jane by Aline Brosh McKenna and Ramon K. Perez; a graphic novel published by Boom! Studios, it is a contemporary reworking of the novel set in modern-day New York, with Jane being a nanny for a Westchester recluse and St. John being reimagined as her crossdressing fashion designer roommate Hector.
- 2018: Brightly Burning by Alexa Donne. A young adult romantic mystery set in space.

==== Re-tellings ====
- 2006: The Translator by Leila Aboulela, a Sudanese British Muslim retelling.
- 2007: Thornfield Hall: Jane Eyre's Hidden Story by Emma Tennant.
- 2010: I am Jane Eyre by Teana Rowland. This version of Jane Eyre delves into some of the unexplained aspects of the novel.
- 2015: Jane Eyre: My Private Autobiography by W.J. Harrison. This version of Jane Eyre works in some novel twists that fit into the original plot, such as Jane's pursuit of Rochester and St. John's homosexuality.
- 2021: The Wife Upstairs by Rachel Hawkins.
- 2023: Jane & Edward by Melodie Edwards. Retelling of Jane Eyre in modern times.

==== Prequels ====
- 1966: Wide Sargasso Sea by Jean Rhys. The character Bertha Mason serves as the main protagonist for this novel which acts as a prequel to Jane Eyre. It describes the meeting and marriage of Antoinette Cosway (later renamed Bertha by Mr. Rochester) and Mr. Rochester. In its reshaping of events related to Jane Eyre, the novel suggests that Bertha's madness is not congenital, but rather the result of terrible childhood experiences and Mr. Rochester's unloving treatment of her. Wide Sargasso Sea has been adapted into film twice.
- 2026: Je by Lilia Hassaine. This French novel is a re-telling of Jean Rhys’ Wide Sargasso Sea written as a book Antoinette Cosway writes for her son Pierre as she is being kept in Edward Rochester’s attic.

==== Spin-offs ====
- 2001: The novel The Eyre Affair by Jasper Fforde revolves around the plot of Jane Eyre. It portrays the book as originally largely free of literary contrivance: Jane and Mr. Rochester's first meeting is a simple conversation without the dramatic horse accident, and Jane does not hear his voice calling for her and ends up starting a new life in India. The protagonist's efforts mostly accidentally change it to the real version.
- 2009: Becoming Jane Eyre by Sheila Kohler. A novel about Charlotte Brontë writing the story.
- 2009: Jane Airhead by Kay Woodward. A novel about a present-day teenage girl obsessed with Jane Eyre.

==== Re-tellings from another character's point of view ====
- 1966: Wide Sargasso Sea by Jean Rhys. Bertha's story beginning with her origins in the Caribbean, where she was forced to marry Rochester, and ending with her entrapment and suicide in Rochester's English home.
- 2000: Adèle: Jane Eyre's Hidden Story by Emma Tennant
- 2006: The French Dancer's Bastard: The Story of Adèle From Jane Eyre by Emma Tennant. This is a slightly modified version of Tennant's 2000 novel.
- 2009: Adele, Grace, and Celine: The Other Women of Jane Eyre by Claire Moise. This both retells the story from the point of view of three other women and explains their fate after the main events of the story.
- 2010: Rochester: A Novel Inspired by Jane Eyre by J.L. Niemann. Jane Eyre told from the first-person perspective of Edward Rochester.
- 2011: Jane Eyre's Rival: The Real Mrs Rochester by Clair Holland. Told from the perspective of Bertha Antoinetta Mason, Mr. Rochester's first wife, by Lisa Mason, Antoinetta's modern-day descendant.
- 2011: Jane Eyre's Husband – The Life of Edward Rochester by Tara Bradley. Rochester's entire life.
- 2017: Mr Rochester by Sarah Shoemaker – Edward Fairfax Rochester's life before he meets Jane, then essentially, Jane Eyre from his perspective.
- 2022: Reluctant Immortals by Gwendolyn Kiste. Reimagines Rochester as am immortal villain and Bertha as a victim who becomes immortal.
- 2022: Reader, I Murdered Him by Betsy Cornwell. Tells Adele's story starting from before Rochester takes her to England through the novel and focuses on her time after Jane Eyre at school in London.

==== Other influences ====
- 1938: Rebecca by Daphne du Maurier has parallels with Jane Eyre. However, the author never confirmed any direct influence of Jane Eyre on her novel.

=== Music ===
- 2019: Madwoman in the Attic, a song by Blackbriar and featured on their album Our Mortal Remains, is inspired by the novel.
