= Westway =

Westway may refer to:

- Westway (London), a main road in London
- Westway (New York) a proposed but unbuilt highway
- Westway (radio series), a BBC World Service soap opera
- Westway (TV series), a British TV series made in 1976
- Westway, Texas
- The Westway, the western extension of Lawrence Avenue (Toronto), Toronto, Ontario
- Kingsview Village-The Westway, a Toronto, Ontario neighbourhood in Etobicoke

== See also ==
- West Way (disambiguation)
