= Alexa Donne =

American author

- Born: 1984 (age 41–42)
- Education: Boston University
- Occupations: Author, youtuber
- Years active: 2017–present
- Website: alexadonne.com

Alexa Donne is an American author and Internet personality. She has published the young adult science fiction retellings Brightly Burning and The Stars We Steal, as well as various young adult thriller novels. Her latest thriller The Bitter End was published in 2024 by Random House Children's Books.

== Early life and education ==
Donne studied German in high school, taking part in the German American Partnership Program where she spent three weeks at the Berufskolleg Bergisch Gladbach vocational school. She then did a yearlong exchange to the Albert Schweitzer Gymnasium as part of the Congress-Bundestag Youth Exchange program. Donne has stated that this experience inspired various aspects of her books, from the German cultural inspirations in the protagonist of her second novel, The Stars We Steal.

Donne graduated from Boston University.

== Career ==
=== Marketing and mentorship ===
Donne moved to Los Angeles to work in television marketing.

In 2016, Donne co-founded the Author Mentor Match program with Heather Kaczynski, now a fellow author. Donne also mentors with WriteGirl, an organization for professional women writers in Los Angeles.

=== Writing career ===
In 2017, Donne started a YouTube channel documenting her experience writing and publishing her first novel. As of 2025, Donne has 164,000 subscribers and 572 videos on the publishing industry and writing process.

Donne's first novel Brightly Burning was published by HMH Teen in 2018. The novel is a young adult science fiction retelling of Jane Eyre, and was nominated for the 2018 Dragon Awards in the Best Young Adult / Middle Grade Novel category. In 2020, Donne published The Stars We Steal, a Persuasion science fiction retelling and companion novel to her first publication.

In 2021, Donne published her young adult thriller debut The Ivies with the Crown Publishing Group. The novel was featured in the 2022 Top Ten Titles of the Young Adult Library Services Association.

The following year, Donne published Pretty Dead Queens with the same publisher. The novel was a finalist for the Best Young Adult Novel category of the Edgar Allan Poe Award.

In 2024, Donne published her fifth novel and third thriller, The Bitter End, loosely based on Agatha Christie's And Then There Were None, which tells the story of a group of students on a ski trip at a remote mountain location.

== Bibliography ==
=== Young adult sci-fi ===
- Donne, Alexa (2018). Brightly Burning. HMH Teen. ISBN 978-1328948939.
- Donne, Alexa (2020). The Stars We Steal. HMH Teen. ISBN 978-1328948946.

=== Young adult thriller ===
- Donne, Alexa (2021). The Ivies. Crown. ISBN 978-0593303702.
- Donne, Alexa (2022). Pretty Dead Queens. Crown. ISBN 978-0593479827.
- Donne, Alexa (2024). The Bitter End. Random House Children's Books. ISBN 978-0593651063.
