= Debris (TV series) =

2021 American science fiction drama television series

- Genre: Science fiction; Drama
- Created by: J. H. Wyman
- Starring: Jonathan Tucker; Riann Steele; Norbert Leo Butz; Scroobius Pip
- Theme music composer: Raney Shockne and J. H. Wyman
- Composer: Raney Shockne
- Country of origin: United States
- Original language: English
- No. of seasons: 1
- No. of episodes: 13

Production
- Executive producers: Brad Anderson; Samantha Corbin-Miller; Jeff Vlaming; Jason Hoffs; J. H. Wyman
- Producers: Tanya Swerling; Bonnie R. Benwick; Jeff Rafner
- Cinematography: Michael Wale
- Editor: Tanya Swerling
- Camera setup: Single-camera
- Running time: 42–43 minutes
- Production companies: Frequency Films; Legendary Television; Universal Television

Original release
- Network: NBC
- Release: March 1 – May 24, 2021

Debris is an American science fiction television series that premiered on March 1, 2021, on NBC. The series, produced by Universal Television and Legendary Television, was created and co-executive produced by J. H. Wyman. In May 2021, the series was canceled after one season.

== Premise ==
Debris of an alien spacecraft has been falling across Earth over the last six months. An international task force is formed to identify and collect these pieces because they are found to have unusual and often deadly effects on humans and their surroundings. The show follows partners CIA operative Bryan Beneventi and MI6 operative Finola Jones as they track down these pieces. But there are also others who are seeking the pieces for themselves.

== Cast and characters ==
=== Main ===
- Jonathan Tucker as Bryan Beneventi, a CIA operative
- Riann Steele as Finola Jones, a MI6 operative
- Norbert Leo Butz as Craig Maddox, a CIA operative and Beneventi's handler
- Scroobius Pip as Anson Ash, a member of Influx, an extremist group that seeks to use the debris for unknown purposes.

=== Recurring ===
- Anjali Jay as Priya Ferris, Jones' MI6 handler
- Gabrielle Ryan as Dee Dee, Jones' younger sister
- Sebastian Roché as Brill, another MI6 agent. Roché also plays an unidentified individual who has stolen Brill's identity.
- Thomas Cadrot as Tom, an Orbital team member
- Andrea Stefancikova as Irina, a Russian secret agent
- Tyrone Benskin as George Jones, a scientist who is Finola's and Dee Dee's father
- Armin Karame as Brandt, an Orbital technician
- Jennifer Copping as Julia Maddox, Craig's wife
- Christian Rose as Dario Maddox, Craig and Julia Maddox's son
- Ben Cotton as Loeb, a member of Influx
- John Noble as Otto, a member of Influx.

== Episodes ==
No.	Title	Directed by	Written by	Original air date	U.S. viewers (millions)
1	"Pilot"	Brad Anderson	J. H. Wyman	March 1, 2021	4.37
Debris from a wrecked alien spacecraft has been falling to Earth for the past six months. CIA officer Bryan Beneventi and MI6 agent Finola Jones lead a task force assigned to identify, locate, and recover the debris before the fragments fall into the wrong hands. After two men illegally purchasing a piece of debris at a hotel narrowly escape capture (although one later turns up trapped in a concrete pillar), Bryan and Finola are redirected to Wichita to investigate several missing persons tied to a large chunk of debris. Finola succumbs to the debris' influence, which manifests as the deceased son of a grieving mother: the debris sensed her pain and is now trying to sustain itself by feeding on the life energy of various men and women which it believes are its "parents". Bryan finds the boy's sister and convinces her to speak to her comatose mother. When the girl pleads with her mother to accept her brother's death, the boy vanishes and Finola and the other victims return to normal. On the flight back, Bryan is contacted by his handler, Maddox, who asks him to keep a secret from his partner, Finola: Finola's father, astrophysicist George Jones, who killed himself and was believed to be dead, is found alive on airport security footage.
2	"You Are Not Alone"	Padraic McKinley	J. H. Wyman	March 8, 2021	3.36
The team is called to investigate a ring of metallic objects forming a barrier around the town of Fleetwood, Pennsylvania. In trying to locate a piece of debris, they find multiple copies of a man named Eric who all struggle with amnesia and eventually die. Using the epicenter of the ring, they locate Eric's house and find a piece of debris had struck him, creating the copies to try to locate what he values most while forming the barrier to keep others out. The debris begins cloning Bryan, forcing him to shoot his own clone. Finola discovers the original Eric likely made it to his car before passing out, which had been dragged into the barrier. She also discovers Eric had just gotten a job in San Francisco and broken up with his girlfriend. As the rest of the team shuts down the debris to contain it, Bryan and Finola race to recover the real Eric as the barrier starts contracting. Eric calls his ex-girlfriend to commit to staying in Fleetwood, ending the debris' effects. Meanwhile, Bryan learns that the CIA and MI6 plan to exhume Jones' body, while Finola tries to reconcile with her sister Dee.
3	"Solar Winds"	Rebecca Rodriguez	J. H. Wyman	March 15, 2021	3.27
A utility worker in Millersburg, Ohio discovers a strange 2-dimensional object that, by studying the work of George Jones, Bryan identifies as an obscure window to another dimension. It keeps disappearing and reappearing at odd intervals. The team learns that a missing teenager, Nicole, and others are trapped inside this other dimension. As they try to figure out a way to open the window and rescue those trapped inside it, Bryan's handler Maddox meets with his Russian counterpart to discuss a secret project, Orbital, that seeks to reverse engineer the debris. The team eventually manages to communicate with Nicole by bringing in her father Richard, but the window keeps disappearing before they can get her out. Finola and Bryan locate some nearby debris, which is slowly running out of power to maintain the portal. After Finola improvises a solution using a piece of debris to pierce the portal, it releases Nicole along with a dozen other people, some of whom were trapped for decades. Finola wonders if the emotional bonds they shared with their missing loved ones is what kept them alive. The CIA exhumes Jones' remains in London, and through surveillance footage of the day of his death, realize that a body double was buried in his place.
4	"In Universe"	Karen Gaviola	Kyle Lierman & Ryan Wagner	March 22, 2021	2.77
A piece of debris begins to terraform the area around a Midwestern farm, causing a group of migrant farmers to mutate so that they can only breathe chlorine instead of oxygen, and will thus die if they try to leave. Bryan and Finola locate Efraim, a man with family members on the farm, and analyze his blood for ideas on how to save the workers. Ultimately, the decision is made to remove the debris when it begins to spread uncontrollably, even though this means the workers will die. Finola then suggests using another piece of debris to place them in suspended animation until a cure can be found. Bryan convinces her not to share the truth with Efraim, arguing that doing so will only complicate the situation. Finola is then contacted by MI6, learning that not only is her father still alive, but that Bryan knew and deliberately hid the truth from her. Because of this, she decides to tell Efraim and free him to make his own decision about what to do. He runs into the area to be mutated so he can join his family. Bryan is bothered by this and tries to ask Finola to explain to him why she did what she did. Finola, unable to trust him, simply leaves.
5	"Earthshine"	Rebecca Rodriguez	Tracy Bellomo & Tiffany Shaw Ho	March 29, 2021	2.61
An extremist group known only as Influx is linked to an incident in New Jersey involving the disappearance of a bus via a wormhole. The group plans to recreate this on a much bigger scale in the heart of New York City, and Bryan and Finola only have two hours to stop them. Bryan suggests that a video file from an incident in China might help, but the file has been deleted and Finola's handler Priya has to send a physical copy. When it arrives, the courier warns her not to trust Priya. By watching the video, the team realizes that opening the wormhole requires two points of convergence, and split up into squads to search every possible location. By the time they find the pieces, however, they are almost fully charged and ready to open the wormhole. Bryan, with the help of a wounded colleague, performs a shut-down procedure to destabilize the connection just in time to stop it while Finola helps take one of Influx's leaders into custody, hoping he'll know something about her father. Afterwards, she turns down a call from Priya and instead watches a clip of a song she used to sing with her sister. Unbeknownst to her, the captive starts singing the same song.
6	"Supernova"	Steven A. Adelson	Jeff Vlaming & Davia Carter	April 5, 2021	2.43
The team investigates a series of missing elderly persons in rural Tennessee, which at first seem to be kidnappings. However, it quickly becomes apparent that the missing individuals went willingly and have managed to attain a form of eternal youth by using a piece of debris. Bryan finally decides to break confidentiality and reveal to Finola the extent to which he has deceived her. Finola, in turn, begins to realize that Priya has also been manipulating her. The man carrying the debris is identified as Kurt Cox, who stubbornly refuses to hand it over until his guilt-ridden wife Clara convinces him to abandon the debris and commit suicide with her by jumping off a cliff. The debris is recovered, and Kurt's remaining followers are moved to a facility to live out the rest of their lives. Maddox trades with the Russians for a portion of debris, seemingly for personal reasons. While on the road, Finola tries to convince Bryan to work against Maddox, arguing that they can trust no one but themselves. Bryan is reluctant as Maddox once saved his life, but tells Finola that she is being surveilled by the CIA.
7	"You Can Call Her Caroline"	Tim Southam	Samantha Corbin-Miller and Tracy Bellomo	April 12, 2021	2.62
Maddox gives the team a lead on a potential Influx cell in Maine, and assigns them to investigate. Meanwhile, he oversees the use of electroshock equipment to force Anson Ash to remember where he hid George Jones. In Maine, Bryan and Finola find a dead man, a woman who doesn't remember taking a bag from him, the man's socially repressed brother Luke, and his daughter Caroline, who is collecting shards of debris from a marsh behind her house. At first, they struggle to put the pieces together until Finola deduces that the debris is being used to mentally control and manipulate people. Bryan then realizes that Luke, a veteran like him, is angry at the military and has been using the debris to give himself temporary psychic abilities so he can carry out a terrorist attack. Luke controls Bryan and Finola and compels them to leave, then tries to force Bryan to commit suicide until Caroline sacrifices her own psychic abilities to kill him. Finola gets a call from Dee that leaves her concerned; unbeknownst to her, the call was made at the behest of Priya. Maddox contacts the team and orders them to prepare to rescue George.
8	"Spaceman"	Clare Kilner	J. H. Wyman	April 19, 2021	2.51
During prep work for the raid, Maddox gives Bryan secret instructions to assassinate George; however, Finola is instructed by Priya to bring George to a courier who will secretly send him to England. The two reveal their orders to each other and agree to work to save George's life. The raid goes smoothly until Finola locates her father, and Bryan is forced to shoot a fellow agent to protect him. Another agent is killed in the crossfire. Finola is contacted by her sister, who confirms what she had feared: neither Maddox nor Priya can be trusted. She and Bryan take George to a motel, where he explains that Influx forced him to build a device to locate a piece of debris that he describes as a "game-changer.” He also tries to make amends with his angry daughter, telling her that finding all of the debris is the key to fixing what he sees as a dying world. Bryan helps George to make a list of materials he needs to build a similar device, while Finola contacts Priya and tells her to gather files on Orbital in exchange for Finola's keeping her informed on their progress. That night, George goes to sleep after covering himself with sheets of aluminum foil.
9	"Do You Know Icarus?"	Padraic McKinley	J. H. Wyman and Ryan Wagner	April 26, 2021	2.60
On the way to another piece of debris, Finola and Bryan stop at a house. When they ring the doorbell, a young man named Shelby answers the door. Shelby begins to tell them that he knows how to use the debris. The debris takes you two days in the past. He tells them that the device is out in the ocean and that he and his sister, Kathleen, were using it for fun. However, Kathleen disappeared the last time they used it. Shelby asks them to contact George Jones for help. George tells Finola that Shelby must stop using the debris because it is causing the universe to unravel. Shelby runs out and uses the device again. When reality is reset, Bryan manages to get close enough to the debris that he gets caught in the jump and is taken to another reality. When Bryan tries to explain the situation to his new partner, she refuses to listen to him. Bryan asks her to call George Jones, and she tells him that he killed George Jones in a raid weeks previously. She goes outside to call Maddox, and Bryan calls Finola at the Orbital headquarters in London.
10	"I Am Icarus"	Padraic McKinley	J. H. Wyman and Kyle Lierman	May 3, 2021	2.52
Bryan and Shelby agree to continue using the debris together to try to get back to their reality. However, when Bryan rings the doorbell for the house this time, Kathleen answers the door instead of Shelby. Inside the house, portals to other universes have appeared. When Bryan and Kathleen decide to use the debris again, we see Finola and her new partner in the SUV on the way to the debris instead of Bryan. When Finola rings the doorbell, Kathleen answers. She explains to Finola what has been happening. Kathleen and Finola go into the kitchen where they see Shelby and Bryan on the other side of a portal into another reality. Bryan and Finola write to each other to figure out how to fix the universe. They decide to synchronize their jumps so all four of them use the debris at the same time. When they do, Bryan and Finola are back together in the car on the way to the debris. They ring the doorbell of the house, and both Shelby and Kathleen answer the door.
11	"Asalah"	Eagle Egilsson	J. H. Wyman and Ryan Wagner	May 10, 2021	2.43
Orbital agents are searching in the woods for a piece of debris when one of them comes across a woman sitting with a shimmer near her. The only words she will say is "Bryan Beneventi." George leaves the cabin in Oregon and drives himself across the country to go to Virginia. Finola and Bryan are called about the woman in the woods, and they drive there to her. The woman's name is Mariel Caldwell. When Bryan tries to talk to her, she begins to recite snippets of conversations that Bryan recognizes. She grabs Bryan's arm, and he goes into a trance where he relives his past in Afghanistan. As a soldier in Afghanistan, Bryan meets a young Afghan woman named Asalah. She tries to help him find the Taliban insurgents in order to protect her grandfather. However, she is killed in the crossfire. As Bryan sees Mariel appear in a chair, he tries to find out why she made him relive this. However, at the last minute, he is brought out of his trance by Orbital.
12	"A Message from Ground Control"	Brad Anderson	Glen Whitman and Kyle Lierman	May 17, 2021	2.32
George, Finola and Bryan arrive at an abandoned satellite station. George begins work on getting the satellites to look for the “game-changer” debris. Meanwhile, some debris pieces at Orbital are mysteriously moving around on their own. Finola and Bryan are called back to find out what is happening with the debris. When they go in to investigate, they find several technicians in a trance, lined up in a hallway, and another two technicians moving, zombie-like, grabbing boxes and lining them up in one of the aisles. Then the boxes start to fling themselves, one by one, into an invisible portal. A few seconds later, the individual boxes are then flung out of the portal, crushed and mangled, onto the floor. They find a way to stop the process. However, when Bryan goes alone to another area, he sees a vision of Mariel Caldwell. This time, he is able to get an answer about why the debris wanted him to relive the past. Afterwards, he convinces Finola to let the debris finish their process of constructing something. When the process is finished, a ball of light appears and then leaves. Anson Ash breaks out of prison. When he meets up with Loeb, they are told by Otto that George Jones has found the “game-changer” debris.
13	"Celestial Body"	Eagle Egilsson	J. H. Wyman	May 24, 2021	2.43
George finds the game-changer debris. He tells Finola and Bryan that they must leave immediately. They travel to a stone quarry and find a group of people standing in a trance. George and Finola find the large hunk of debris, shimmering. Bryan goes down the slope to get the instruments to shut down the debris. While he is gone, George talks to Finola and admits that this debris is not a map-maker that will show where all the other pieces of debris are, like he told them earlier. This debris is something more powerful that can change humanity. When Finola becomes upset during their conversation, George tells her that Influx is coming and will be there soon. He called them. Ash, Loeb and Otto all arrive almost instantly and subdue Finola. George works to release the people from the debris’ influence, but informs her that when he does this, the process will erase the memories of everyone there, including Bryan. Finola refuses to go with George. George runs the program, releasing the people from the debris, and he and Influx escape. Finola runs to Bryan, who somehow still has his memories. She informs him that George betrayed them and asks him what to do about Maddox.

== Production ==
=== Development ===
The series was ordered as a pilot by NBC in January 2020, the first drama to be given a pilot order by the network for the 2020–21 season. The same day it was also announced that Jason Hoffs would be joining J.H. Wyman as co-executive producer. On June 29, 2020, NBC picked up the pilot to series. On May 27, 2021, NBC canceled the series after one season.

=== Casting ===
On February 11, 2020, it was announced that Jonathan Tucker had been cast in the pilot as the male lead, in the character of Bryan Beneventi. Shortly after, it was announced that Riann Steele had been cast to portray the character of Finola Jones, the female lead. The same month, it was announced that Norbert Leo Butz would be joining the series main cast as Craig Maddox. On October 20, 2020, Anjali Jay was cast in a recurring role. On December 18, 2020, Gabrielle Ryan joined the cast in a recurring capacity. On January 26, 2021, Scroobius Pip was listed as being a main cast member. On February 3, 2021, Sebastian Roché was cast in a recurring role.

=== Filming ===
Though the series was greenlighted only in January 2020, the majority of the pilot was filmed before production was suspended across the United States due to the COVID-19 pandemic. Filming for the remainder of the first season took place from November 2, 2020 to April 9, 2021, in Vancouver, British Columbia. In the first episode, the airport hangar scene is filmed in the Heritage Hangar at the Boundary Bay Airport in Delta, British Columbia. Many outdoor scenes were filmed around the Delta, Ladner, Surrey areas of British Columbia.

== Broadcast ==
The series premiered on March 1, 2021, on NBC. Legendary Television secured a deal with TF1 and U-Next for exclusive distribution rights to the series in France and Japan.

== Reception ==
=== Critical response ===
On Rotten Tomatoes, the series holds an approval rating of 72% based on 18 critic reviews, with an average rating of 6.75/10. The website's critical consensus reads, "Though Debris early characterization is a shade too ambiguous, its central mystery has enough spooky sci-fi juice to keep viewers guessing—for at least one season." On Metacritic, it has a weighted average score of 63 out of 100 based on 11 critic reviews, indicating "generally favorable reviews".

Saloni Gajjar of The A.V. Club gave the series a B− and wrote a review saying, "As much as they're trying, the actors don't yet have the prowess to carry the emotive weight of the show. To find its space in this television landscape, Debris should rely on the power of the titular space junk."

=== Ratings ===
Viewership and ratings per episode of Debris
No.	Title	Air date	Rating (18–49)	Viewers (millions)	DVR (18–49)	DVR viewers (millions)	Total (18–49)	Total viewers (millions)
1	"Pilot"	March 1, 2021	0.6	4.37	0.3	2.48	0.9	6.85
2	"You Are Not Alone"	March 8, 2021	0.4	3.36	0.3	2.35	0.7	5.71
3	"Solar Winds"	March 15, 2021	0.4	3.27	—N/a	—N/a	—N/a	—N/a
4	"In Universe"	March 22, 2021	0.4	2.77	—N/a	—N/a	—N/a	—N/a
5	"Earthshine"	March 29, 2021	0.3	2.61	—N/a	—N/a	—N/a	—N/a
6	"Supernova"	April 5, 2021	0.4	2.43	—N/a	—N/a	—N/a	—N/a
7	"You Can Call Her Caroline"	April 12, 2021	0.4	2.62	0.3	2.03	0.7	4.65
8	"Spaceman"	April 19, 2021	0.4	2.51	0.3	2.03	0.7	4.54
9	"Do You Know Icarus?"	April 26, 2021	0.4	2.60	0.2	1.80	0.6	4.40
10	"I Am Icarus"	May 3, 2021	0.4	2.52	0.2	1.63	0.6	4.12
11	"Asalah"	May 10, 2021	0.4	2.43	0.3	1.66	0.7	4.10
12	"A Message from Ground Control"	May 17, 2021	0.3	2.32	0.2	1.65	0.5	3.97
13	"Celestial Body"	May 24, 2021	0.3	2.43	0.3	1.59	0.6	4.01
