= Bad Girls series 1 =

Bad Girls
- Season 1
- Re-release DVD
- Starring: Simone Lahbib; Mandana Jones; Debra Stephenson; Jack Ellis
- No. of episodes: 10

Release
- Original network: ITV
- Original release: 1 June – 3 August 1999

Series chronology
- Next → Series 2

The first series of Bad Girls premiered on ITV on 1 June 1999, and ended on 3 August 1999. It consists of ten episodes. The show was produced by Shed Productions as part of Shed Media. After the first episode aired, the show became an instant hit in the United Kingdom. The show also became successful in several countries including the United States, Australia and Republic of Ireland.

== Storylines ==
The first series focuses on the growing relationship between new G-Wing governor Helen Stewart and prisoner Nikki Wade. Helen tries to show the prisoners that she on their side by taking matters such as miscarriage, bullying and drugs seriously, whereas the other officers, like Sylvia Hollamby, don't take any interest in the prisoners' problems. Helen doesn't get the support she needs from her officers and tries to convince Nikki that she needs her help in running an orderly wing. This is when Nikki's attraction for Helen begins to grow. Other major storylines in the first series is top dog, Shell Dockley's bullying against new prisoner Rachel Hicks, her drug dealing and her affair with senior officer Jim Fenner who also begins an affair with Rachel, as they become involved in a love triangle, Shell and her sidekick Denny Blood torture Rachel to the point where she takes her own life. New prisoner Zandra Plackett struggles to kick her drug habit, and things get worse when she discovers she's pregnant. Monica Lindsay, another new prisoner on G-Wing, finds it hard to cope when she worries about how her son, Spencer, who has Down's syndrome, will deal with his mother's wrongful imprisonment.

== Cast ==
=== Main ===
- Simone Lahbib as G-Wing Governor Helen Stewart
- Mandana Jones as Nicola "Nikki" Wade
- Debra Stephenson as Michelle "Shell" Dockley
- Jack Ellis as James "Jim" Fenner
- Alicya Eyo as Daniella "Denny" Blood
- Luisa Bradshaw-White as Lorna Rose
- Joe Shaw as Dominic McAllister
- Lara Cazalet as Zandra Plackett
- Jane Lowe as Monica Lindsay
- Sharon Duncan Brewster as Crystal Gordon
- Helen Fraser as Sylvia Hollamby
- Victoria Alcock as Julie Saunders
- Kika Mirylees as Julie Johnston
- Joanne Froggatt as Rachel Hicks

=== Recurring ===
- Oliver Fox as Sean Parr
- Roland Oliver as Simon Stubberfield
- Eugene Walker as Officer Blakeson
- Timmy Lang as Spencer Lindsay
- Gideon Turner as Robin Dunstan
- Denise Black as Jessie Devlin
- Victoria Pritchard as Trisha
- Linda Henry as Yvonne Atkins

=== Guest ===
- Ashley Miller as Carol Byatt
- Penny Ryder as Nellie Snape
- Shelley Longworth as Ms Wall
- Susan Aderin as Ms Carter
- Pauline Whitaker as Nun
- Daryl Fisher as Mrs Hicks
- Vinny Dhillon as Clinic Nurse
- Sheila Ruskin as Mrs Dunstan
- David Case as Chaplain
- Jean Ainslie as Sister Jill
- Ian Flintoff as Vicar
- Jane Galloway as Mary
- Andrew Frame as Officer Donegan
- Alastair Stewart as Newsreader/Himself

== Episodes ==
| No. overall | No. in series | Title | Directed by | Written by | Original release date | UK viewers (millions) |
|---|---|---|---|---|---|---|
| 1 | 1 | "Them and Us" | Mike Adams | Maureen Chadwick | 1 June 1999 | 7.99 |
As the inmates rehearse for a fashion show, a miscarrying inmate almost dies in her cell. Helen is forced into an alliance with difficult prisoner Nikki Wade. A smelly inmate returns and upsets everyone with her nasty habits and Fenner plays dangerous games with Shell and Rachel. Note: first appearances of Helen Stewart (Simone Lahbib), Nikki Wade (Mandana Jones), Shell Dockley (Debra Stephenson), Jim Fenner (Jack Ellis), Denny Blood (Alicya Eyo), Lorna Rose (Luisa Bradshaw-White), Dominic McAllister (Joe Shaw), Sylvia Hollamby (Helen Fraser), Julie Saunders (Victoria Alcock), Julie Johnston (Kika Mirylees) and Rachel Hicks (Joanne Froggatt)
| 2 | 2 | "Drug Wars" | Mike Adams | Maureen Chadwick | 8 June 1999 | 7.39 |
Helen takes a tough stance on drugs. New inmate Monica Lindsay is in for a complete culture shock but quickly proves that she's no pushover. An old inmate returns to the wrath of Denny and Shell. Note: first appearance of Zandra Plackett (Lara Cazalet) and Monica Lindsay (Jane Lowe)
| 3 | 3 | "Love Rival" | Laurence Moody | Phil Ford | 15 June 1999 | 6.36 |
Jim takes advantage of his authority and begins to regret it when Shell bullies Rachel. A new religious inmate, Crystal Gordon, arrives and she ruffles feathers. Zandra is heartbroken when she is dumped by her fiancé while she is organising her wedding. Note: first appearance of Crystal Gordon (Sharon Duncan Brewster)
| 4 | 4 | "The Victim" | Laurence Moody | Martin Allen | 22 June 1999 | 6.86 |
Rachel's troubles increase when her mother gives her daughter to foster care, causing Rachel to completely break down and takes her own life on the wing. Nikki is left heartbroken when Tricia confesses she has met someone else. Zandra makes a bid for freedom. Note: final appearance of Rachel Hicks (Joanne Froggatt)
| 5 | 5 | "Tangled Web" | Laurence Moody | Louise Page | 29 June 1999 | 7.05 |
Nikki and Shell finally come to blows following Rachel's death. Helen investigates Rachel's death and all the evidence points to a cover-up involving Principal Officer Fenner. Nikki struggles to come to terms with her growing feelings for Helen. Dominic announces his desire to leave Larkhall.
| 6 | 6 | "A Big Mistake" | Jim O'Hanlon | Tom Higgins | 6 July 1999 | 7.02 |
New prisoner Jessie Devlin arrives at Larkhall and uncovers a past she thought closed forever. Zandra blackmails Officer Lorna Rose into bringing drugs into Larkhall.
| 7 | 7 | "Playing with Fire" | Jim O'Hanlon | Ann McManus | 13 July 1999 | 7.67 |
Nikki makes a desperate bid to show Helen how much she loves her. Shell is stripped of her privileges when drugs are found in her cell and someone's going to pay.
| 8 | 8 | "Falling Apart" | Mike Adams | Sally Wainwright | 20 July 1999 | 7.60 |
Monica's thoughts turn suicidal when she learns some terrible news about her son. The Julies hatch a plan to bring some good cheer to Larkhall, in the form of wine.
| 9 | 9 | "Pay Back Time" | Mike Adams | Martin Allen | 27 July 1999 | 7.32 |
Shell teams up with Crystal, who believes Shell has changed for good. Shell takes her full revenge on Lorna and nearly ruins Helen's career in the process. Helen struggles unsuccessfully to resist Nikki's charms. Note: final appearance of Lorna Rose (Luisa Bradshaw-White); first appearance of Yvonne Atkins (Linda Henry)
| 10 | 10 | "Love Hurts" | Mike Adams | Maureen Chadwick | 3 August 1999 | 7.66 |
Helen has to tell Sean a few home truths while they organise their wedding. Sean later turns up at Larkhall with a lighter and white spirit. Monica hears some good news about her appeal. Shell spills the beans about her affair with Fenner – to his wife.

== Reception ==
=== Ratings ===
| No. | Title | Air date | Timeslot | Weekly ratings | | Ref(s) |
| No. | Title | Air date | Timeslot | Viewers | Rank | Ref(s) |
|---|---|---|---|---|---|---|
| 1 | "Them and Us" | 1 June 1999 | Tuesday 9:00 pm | 7,990,000 | 17 | |
| 2 | "Drug Wars" | 8 June 1999 | Tuesday 9:00 pm | 7,390,000 | 16 | |
| 3 | "Love Rival" | 15 June 1999 | Tuesday 9:00 pm | 6,360,000 | 18 | |
| 4 | "The Victim" | 22 June 1999 | Tuesday 9:00 pm | 6,860,000 | 17 | |
| 5 | "Tangled Web" | 29 June 1999 | Tuesday 9:00 pm | 7,050,000 | 19 | |
| 6 | "A Big Mistake" | 6 July 1999 | Tuesday 9:00 pm | 7,020,000 | 14 | |
| 7 | "Playing with Fire" | 13 July 1999 | Tuesday 9:00 pm | 7,670,000 | 12 | |
| 8 | "Falling Apart" | 20 July 1999 | Tuesday 9:00 pm | 7,600,000 | 15 | |
| 9 | "Payback Time" | 27 July 1999 | Tuesday 9:00 pm | 7,320,000 | 12 | |
| 10 | "Love Hurts" | 3 August 1999 | Tuesday 9:00 pm | 7,660,000 | 14 | |

== Home media ==
Original UK DVD

The first series of Bad Girls has been released in the United Kingdom via Condender Entertainment Group on VHS and DVD. It has also been released on DVD in Australia by Shock Records and in the United States and Canada from Capital Entertainment.

The original UK DVD release contains a cropped 4:3 fullscreen aspect ratio, as well as the omission of all recaps at the beginning of episodes, while the soundtrack that was used as part of original broadcasts were replaced for home media due to copyright. The original Australian release is exact to the UK set. The U.S. release, which contains different artwork, released the series in its original 16:9 widescreen aspect ratio.

The series was re-released in both UK and Australia, complete with all recaps and the 16:9 aspect ratio reinstated, from Acorn Media and Shock Records, respectively.

| Title | Region | Release | | | Ref. |
| Title | Region | VHS | DVD | DVD (Reissue) | Ref. |
|---|---|---|---|---|---|
| The Complete First Season | Region 1 | — | 9 May 2006 | — | |
| Series One | Region 2 | 2 June 2000 | 18 June 2001 | 7 February 2011 | |
| Series One | Region 4 | — | 24 March 2003 | 12 January 2011 | |
Features
Specifications: 10 episodes; 4-disc set (original UK & Australia); 3-disc set (U.S.); 3-disc set (re-release UK & Australia); 4:3/1.33:1 aspect ratio (cropped VHS transfer, UK & Australia); 16:9/1.78:1 original aspect ratio (U.S.); 16:9/1.78:1 original aspect ratio (re-release UK & Australia); Subtitles: no; Language: English (stereo); Special features: Documentary: Bad Girls in Oxford*; Commentary Track: Episode 10*; Cast Interviews: Simone Lahbib (Helen); Mandana Jones (Nikki); Debra Stephenson (Shell); Jack Ellis (Jim); Alicya Eyo (Denny); Helen Fraser (Sylvia); Victoria Alcock (Julie S); Kika Mirylees (Julie J); Outtakes; Fan Featurette: Bad Girls Book Signing*; Photo Library*; Note: Special features marked (*) are not available on the re-release DVD
