= Rex Taylor =

American screenwriter

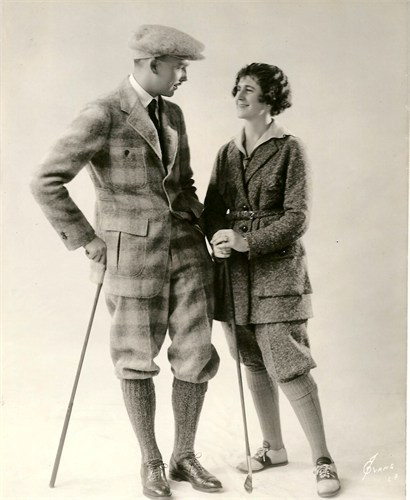
- Rex and Irma Taylor
- Born: November 1, 1889; Iowa, United States
- Died: December 27, 1968 (aged 79); San Pedro, California, United States
- Occupation: Screenwriter
- Years active: 1916-1966

Rex Taylor (November 1, 1889 – December 27, 1968) was an American screenwriter. He wrote for more than 80 films between 1916 and 1966. He was born in Iowa and died in San Pedro, California. He married the actress Irma Taylor (née Whepley) in about 1910; the 1920 and 1930 United States Census Records show the couple as living in Los Angeles in 1920 and 1930.

== Partial filmography ==
- The Stranger (1918)
- A Nymph of the Foothills (1918)
- Set Free (1918)
- Leave It to Susan (1919)
- Twin Beds (1920)
- The Way of a Maid (1921)
- My Lady Friends (1921)
- Marry the Poor Girl (1921)
- Seeing's Believing (1922)
- They Like 'Em Rough (1922)
- Blow Your Own Horn (1923)
- A Noise in Newboro (1923)
- Lights Out (1923)
- The Social Code (1923)
- The Reckless Age (1924)
- Jack O'Clubs (1924)
- The Ridin' Kid from Powder River (1924)
- High and Handsome (1925)
- Irene (1926)
- Rolling Home (1926)
- The Clinging Vine (1926)
- Mulhall's Greatest Catch (1926)
- More Pay, Less Work (1926)
- Don't Tell the Wife (1927)
- Cocktails (1928)
- Adam's Apple (1928)
- Weekend Wives (1928)
- Under the Greenwood Tree (1929)
- The Compulsory Husband (1930)
- The Poor Millionaire (1930)
- Sit Tight (1931)
- The Oil Raider (1934)
- Sitting on the Moon (1936)
- Hawk of the Wilderness (1938)
- Daredevils of the Red Circle (1939)
- Junior G-Men (1940) serial
