= They Like 'Em Rough =

1922 silent film

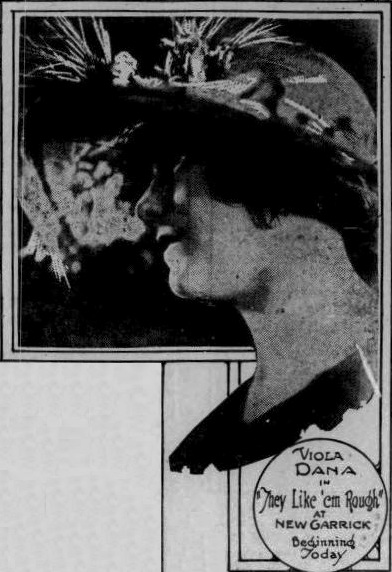
- Directed by: Harry Beaumont
- Written by: Irma Taylor; Rex Taylor
- Starring: Viola Dana; W.E. Lawrence; Hardee Kirkland
- Cinematography: John Arnold
- Production company: Metro Pictures
- Distributed by: Metro Pictures
- Release date: June 12, 1922
- Running time: 50 minutes
- Country: United States
- Languages: Silent; English intertitles

They Like 'Em Rough is a lost 1922 American silent comedy film directed by Harry Beaumont and starring Viola Dana, W.E. Lawrence and Hardee Kirkland.

== Cast ==
- Viola Dana as Katherine
- W.E. Lawrence as Richard Wells Jr.
- Hardee Kirkland as Richard Wells Sr.
- Myrtle Rishell as Mrs. Wells
- Colin Kenny as Waddie
- Steve Murphy as Grogan
- Walter Rodgers as Kelly
- Burton Law as La Grande
- Bradley Ward as Pete
- Knute Erickson as Dr. Curtis
- Elsa Lorimer as Mrs. Curtis

== Preservation ==
With no holdings located in archives, They Like 'em Rough is considered a lost film.

== Bibliography ==
- James Robert Parish & Michael R. Pitts. Film directors: a guide to their American films. Scarecrow Press, 1974.
