= Sonia Dresdel =

British actress (1909–1976)

- in The Clouded Yellow (1950)
- Born: Lois Obee; 5 May 1909; Hornsea, East Riding of Yorkshire, England
- Died: 18 January 1976 (aged 66); Canterbury, Kent, England
- Occupations: Actress, theatre director

Sonia Dresdel (5 May 1909 – 18 January 1976) was an English actress, whose career ran between the 1940s and 1970s.

== Life ==
Dresdel was born Lois Obee in Hornsea, East Riding of Yorkshire, England. She and her family moved to Aberdeen when she was 3 years old. She was educated at Aberdeen High School for Girls, RADA, and the Royal Academy of Music, receiving the degree of licentiate. She graduateed from the University of Aberdeen. Her father, J. H. Obee, was secretary and treasurer of the Hornsea Musical Union.

== Career ==
=== As Lois Obee ===
In the 1920s she performed on radio, including a broadcast of the sketch "An Afternoon Tea Party" on Aberdeen 2BD on 7 June 1927.

Her professional debut came in Northampton with a repertory company, after which she worked with another company in Harrogate. She was with that troupe five years.

She provided the singing voice for Pola Negri in the film The Way of Lost Souls (1929).

In 1931, Dresdel (billed as Lois Obee) acted in Almost a Honeymoon at the Prince of Wales Theatre. In 1933, she performed with the Repertory Theatre in Northampton, England.

By 1944 she had begun using Sonia Dresdel as her stage name.

=== Later career ===
In Dresdel's West End debut, her performance in the lead role of Ibsen's Hedda Gabler at the Westminster Theatre in 1942 "was legendary. It was the performance on which her reputation was founded. James Agate was ecstatic..." For a decade Dresdel was regarded as one of England's foremost stage actresses. Her leading role in the 1947 film While I Live also gained her a great deal of acclaim. In the film she plays Julia Trevelyan, a spinster living in a lonely cliff top house in Cornwall and haunted by the death of her sister 25 years earlier.

During World War II, Dresdel toured with the Entertainments National Service Association.

Her best remembered role is as Mrs. Baines in the film version of Graham Greene's The Fallen Idol (1948), which starred Ralph Richardson, Michèle Morgan and Bobby Henrey. The film received Academy Awards nominations for Best Director (Sir Carol Reed) and Best Screenplay.

In the 1950s, as well as appearing increasingly on television, Dresdel moved more to the management side of things, becoming a theatre director under the aegis of the New White Rose Players, directing plays including the thriller Night of the Shoot. She directed the White Rose Players for one year, 1959.

In the 1970s she played the Witch in BBC Television series Lizzie Dripping, and played Lady Dorothy in the series “Sykes” series 2 episode 5 “Rolls”.

== Later years and death ==
In her later years, Dresdel lived in a cottage in Merstham. She died on 18 January 1976 in Canterbury Hospital in Canterbury of lung cancer, aged 67. The critic Philip Hope-Wallace, said Dresdel was "an actress of high definition with a real power to take an audience by the wrist and give them the works. She had terrific personality and was terribly underused and misused. She would have been the Lady Macbeth of all Lady Macbeths."

== Partial filmography ==
- The World Owes Me a Living (1945) as Eve Heatherley
- While I Live (1947) as Julia Trevelyan
- This Was a Woman (1948) as Sylvia Russell
- The Fallen Idol (1948) as Mrs. Baines
- The Clouded Yellow (1950) as Jess Fenton
- The Third Visitor (1951) as Steffy Millington
- Now and Forever (1956) as Miss Fox
- The Secret Tent (1956) as Miss Mitchum-Browne
- David Copperfield (1956) as Betsey Trotwood
- Death Over My Shoulder (1958) as Miss Upton
- The Trials of Oscar Wilde (1960) as Lady Wilde
- George and the Dragon (1967–1968, TV Series) as Priscilla
- The Break (1962) as Sarah
- Jane Eyre (1963, TV series) as Mrs. Reed
- Public Eye (1968, TV Series) as Mrs. Briggs
- Dixon of Dock Green (1968) as Mrs. Dewar
- The Caesars (1968) as Livia
- Last of the Long-haired Boys (1968) as Miss Dearborn
- Bachelor Father (1970–1971, TV Series) as Mother
- Paul Temple (1971, TV Series) as Agnes Armadyne
- Wives and Daughters (1971, TV Mini-Series) as Lady Cumnor
- The Strauss Family (1972, TV Mini-Series) as Lucari
- Lady Caroline Lamb (1972) as Lady Pont
- The Onedin Line (1972, TV Series) as Lady Lazenby
- Lizzie Dripping (1973–1975, TV Series) as The Witch
- The Pallisers (1974, TV Mini-Series) as the Marchioness of Auld Reekie
