= West Way =

West Way may refer to the following:

- West Way, Oxfordshire, a road in Oxfordshire, England
- West Way, New York, a road in New York, USA
- West Way (Black Forest), a 285-km-long trail in the Black Forest in Germany and Switzerland

== See also ==
- Westway (disambiguation)
