= Jane Lowe =

English actress (born 1943)

- Born: 5 June 1943 (age 83); Wigan, Lancashire, England
- Occupation: Actress
- Years active: 1967–present
- Television: Lizzie Dripping; Jonny Briggs; Bad Girls

Jane Lowe (born 5 June 1943) is an English actress. She is best known for portraying the roles of Aunt Blodwen in Lizzie Dripping (1973–1975), Mam in the BBC children's programme Jonny Briggs (1985–1987) and Monica Lindsey in the ITV drama Bad Girls (1999–2001). Throughout her career on stage and screen that has spanned over five decades, she has appeared in Coronation Street, The Bill and Doctors on numerous occasions as various characters and co-starred in the horror film The Creeping (2022).

== Life and career ==
Lowe was born on 5 June 1943 in Wigan, Lancashire. She began her acting career in 1967, appearing in six episodes of the ITV soap opera Crossroads as Mrs. Coburn, before making her stage debut the same year appearing in productions of The Heir and Bread and Butter at the Castle Theatre in Farnham. Over the next five years, she had minor roles in drama series such as Mr. Rose, Crime Buster, Fraud Squad and Who-Dun-It. She also appeared in episodes of ITV Playhouse and ITV Sunday Night Theatre, as well as an episode of Coronation Street. In 1972, Lowe portrayed Aunt Blodwen in an episode of Jackanory Playhouse which spawned into a spin-off series Lizzie Dripping the following year, and became Lowe's first regular acting job, portraying the character between 1973 and 1975.

Lowe maintained her acting career throughout the next decade, portraying various guest roles in several television shows before appearing in Young Sherlock: The Mystery of the Manor House as Mrs Cunliffe in 1982, and subsequently joining the cast of the 1984 BBC comedy drama Cockles as Mabel Gutteridge. In 1985, Lowe began portraying Mam in the BBC children's television series Jonny Briggs, starring in both series before the show's cancellation in 1987. In 1990, Lowe appeared in Perfect Scoundrels as Mrs. Frobisher and portrayed Toni Spuhler in an episode of the BBC2 anthology series Performance in 1992. In 1993, she made guest appearance in series' such as Gallowglass, May to December and Lovejoy. She also appeared in Cracker (1995) and Hetty Wainthropp Investigates (1996). Lowe also appeared in various stage productions including Who's Afraid of Virginia Woolf? (1992), The Card (1994) and My Mother Said I Never Should (1997).

In 1999, Lowe joined the cast of the ITV drama Bad Girls as Monica Lindsey, a middle-aged, middle-class woman who had been sentenced to five years imprisonment for handling stolen money. The character was released on appeal in the final episode of the first series, however Lowe briefly returned as Monica during the third series, in which she is seen having opened a halfway house for other prisoners.

Lowe has since made regular appearances in television soap operas. She has appeared in the BBC medical soap opera Doctors on seven occasions in various roles, as well as appearing in The Bill five times and Coronation Street four times. She also appeared in an episode of the BBC sitcom Not Going Out in 2013. In 2022, Lowe co-starred in the horror film The Creeping. For her portrayal of Lucy Blakeley, she won the award for Best Supporting Actress at the Houston Horror Film Festival.

== Filmography ==
Year	Title	Role	Notes
1967	Crossroads	Mrs. Coburn	6 episodes
1968	Mr. Rose	First woman	Episode: "The Unlucky Dip"
1968	Crime Buster	Unknown	Episode: "Howzat"
1969	Fraud Squad	Rose	Episode: "Anybody Here Seen Kelly?"
1969	Who-Dun-It	Phillipa Best	Episode: "Crime at the Panto"
1969	ITV Playhouse	Bucky Branch	Episode: "Ancient and Modern"
1971	Coronation Street	Barbara Bromley	3 episodes
1972	ITV Sunday Night Theatre	Mrs. Boyle	Episode: "Whose Life Is It Anyway?"
1972	Jackanory Playhouse	Aunt Blodwen	Episode: "Lizzie Dripping and the Orphans"
1973–1975	Lizzie Dripping	Aunt Blodwen	Main role
1975	Play for Today	Norma	Episode: "Wednesday Love"
1975	Daft as a Brush	Factory worker's wife	Television film
1975	Angels	Beryl	Episode: "Off Duty"
1975	The Nearly Man	Phyllis	Episode: "Casualties: August 1975"
1976	Westway	Paula Harvey	Main role
1976	Coronation Street	Doreen Thornley	1 episode
1977	Play for Today	Public relations girl	Episode: "Spend Spend Spend"
1977	Jubilee	Hilde	Episode: "Wind of Change"
1977	Rooms	Aunt Rose	Recurring role
1978	Z-Cars	Mrs. Thomas	Episode: "Quilley on the Spot"
1978	Disraeli	Charlotte de Rothschild	Episode: "The Great Game 1858–1872"
1979	Telford's Change	Mary	Episode: "The Philistines Of Sussex/Situation Vacant"
1979	Crown Court	Sarah Fine	3 episodes
1979	The Strange Affair of Adelaide Harris	Mrs. Harris	5 episodes
1979	Leave it to Charlie	Dora Rickenbacker	Episode: "Ole Brown Eyes"
1969	ITV Playhouse	Joanna	Episode: "Casting the Runes"
1980	Ladykillers	Edna Baker	Episode: "Lucky, Lucky Thirteen!"
1980	ITV Playhouse	Janice	Episode: "Hands"
1980	Life for Christine	Headmistress	Television film
1982	Young Sherlock: The Mystery of the Manor House	Mrs. Cunliffe	Main role, 7 episodes
1984	Cockles	Mabel Gutteridge	Main role
1985	One by One	Mrs. Younger	Episode: "Pride of Place"
1985	I Woke Up One Morning	Maureen	1 episode
1985	Late Starter	Jean	3 episodes
1985–1987	Jonny Briggs	Mam	Main role
1986	The Bill	Mrs. Simpson	Episode: "Ringer"
1986	The Practice	Miriam Raintree	2 episodes
1989	The Bill	Debbie's mother	Episode: "Street Games and Board Games"
1989	Boon	Amelia Woods	Episode: "All in a Day's Pork"
1990	Perfect Scoundrels	Mrs. Frobisher	Episode: "The Day of Jubilo"
1992	Performance	Toni Spuhler	Episode: "Tales from Hollywood"
1993	Gallowglass	Iris	1 episode
1993	May to December	Snooty customer	Episode: "Baby Love"
1993	Lovejoy	Camilla	Episode: "A Going Concern"
1995	Casualty	Alice Munton	Episode: "When All Else Fails"
1995	Cracker	Landlady	Episode: "True Romance: Part 1"
1996	Hetty Wainthropp Investigates	Alice Baynes	Episode: "Safe as Houses"
1996	The Bill	Jean Booth	Episode: "Minding"
1997	Wokenwell	Alma Watling	1 episode
1997	EastEnders	Brenda	1 episode
1998	The Bill	Carol Houghton	Episode: "The Parent Trap"
1998	Peak Practice	Jayne Swift	Episode: "Once in a Lifetime"
1999	The Blonde Bombshell	Millicent Lake	1 episode
1999	Four Fathers	Mrs. Pagel	1 episode
1999–2001	Bad Girls	Monica Lindsey	Main role
2000	Heartbeat	Mrs. Edna Bostwick	Episode: "Child's Play"
2001	Lies... In Love	Nancy's mother	Film
2001	Down to Earth	Lady Wharton	3 episodes
2001	Doctors	Maeve Ripley	Episode: "Sleeping Beauty"
2002	Crime and Punishment	Landlady	Television film
2002	Judge John Deed	Mary Hay	Episode: "Nobody's Fool"
2003	Silent Witness	Enid Parkin	Episode: "Beyond Guilt: Part 1"
2004	Doctors	Barbara Martin	Episode: "Cuckoo in the Nest"
2005	Holby City	Joyce Harris	Episode: "Thinking Outside the Box"
2005–2007	Cold Blood	Mary Osbourne	2 episodes
2005	Spooks	Fiona's mother	Episode: "The Russian"
2006	Housewife, 49	Mrs Higham	Television film
2007	Doctors	Cecily Langer	Episode: "Up, Up and Away"
2008	Holby City	Kate Pervis	2 episodes
2008	The Royal	Mrs. Smythe	Episode: "Against All Odds"
2009	Hustle	Miriam	Episode: "Politics"
2009	Doctors	Elsa Scott	3 episodes
2010	The Bill	Margaret Cooper	Episode: "Time Bomb"
2010	Moving On	Maureen	Episode: "Losing My Religion"
2011	7 Lives	Mary's mum	Film
2011	Doctors	Mrs. Zelda Smith	Episode: "Night Thoughts"
2013	Doctors	Evelyn Bowe	Episode: "Sweet Sixteen"
2013	Casualty	Georgina Melbury	Episode: "What You Believe"
2013	Not Going Out	Carol	Episode: "The House"
2015	Emmerdale	Mrs. Biggs	1 episode
2015	Doctors	Eileen Grant	Episode: "Injecting a Little Spice"
2017	Doctors	Alice Lawson	Episode: "Magpie"
2017	Loose Ends	Biddy	Short film
2018	Casualty	Valerie Clerk	Episode: "Rage in Resus"
2018	Coronation Street	Bertha Plumtree	1 episode
2020	Coronation Street	Margaret Newsome	3 episodes
2022	The Creeping	Lucy Blakeley	Film

== Stage ==
Year	Title	Role	Venue
1967	The Heir	Margherita	Castle Theatre, Farnham
1967	Bread and Butter	Miriam (butter)	Castle Theatre, Farnham
1970	What the Butler Saw	Mrs Prentice	Queen's Theatre, Hornchurch
1970	Dead Silence	Mrs Masters	Queen's Theatre, Hornchurch
1970	Someone Waiting	Vera Nedlow	Hippodrome, London
1970	Someone Waiting	Vera Nedlow	Palace Theatre, Manchester
1971	Barefoot in the Park	Mrs Banks	Liverpool Playhouse
1971	The Woman in White	Marian Halcombe	Castle Theatre, Farnham
1974	Candida	Candida Morell	Watford Palace Theatre
1979	Saturday Sunday Monday	Unknown	Royal Lyceum Theatre
1984	Mandragola	Sostrata	Royal National Theatre
1985	A Man for All Seasons	Lady Alice More	Nottingham Playhouse
1985	Me Mam Sez	Mam	Nottingham Playhouse
1987	A Cuckoo in the Nest	Mrs Spoker	Redgrave Theatre, Farnham
1988–1989	The Beaux' Stratagem	Lady Bountiful	Unknown
1989	Death of a Salesman	Mrs Spoker	Redgrave Theatre, Farnham
1990	Rebecca	Unknown	Churchill Theatre
1990	The Entertainer	Phoebe Rice	Redgrave Theatre, Farnham
1991	Steel Magnolias	M'Lynn	New Wolsey Theatre
1991	Hay Fever	Judith Bliss	New Wolsey Theatre
1992	Who's Afraid of Virginia Woolf?	Martha	New Wolsey Theatre
1992	Medea	Woman of Corinth	Almeida Theatre
1993	The Belle of Belfast City	Vi	Orange Tree Theatre
1994	The Card	Mrs Machin	Regent's Park Open Air Theatre
1993–1994	Medea	Woman of Corinth	Liverpool Playhouse
1993–1994	Medea	Woman of Corinth	Wyndham's Theatre
1996	Romeo and Juliet	Unknown	New End Theatre
1996	The Verge	Adelaide	Orange Tree Theatre
1997	My Mother Said I Never Should	Margaret	The Young Vic Theatre
2000	Venecia	Rita	Gate Theatre
2002	Long Time No See	Freda	Stratford Circus
2003	True West	Mom	Bristol Old Vic
2006	Hedda Gabler	Aunt Juli	West Yorkshire Playhouse
2006	Hedda Gabler	Aunt Juli	Liverpool Playhouse
2011	Notes to Future Self	Daphne	Birmingham Repertory Theatre
2011	Buried Child	Halie	Curve Theatre
2012	Calcutta Kosher	Mozelle	Arcola Theatre
2013	The Summer House	Tatiana	Soho Theatre
2013	As Is	Hospice worker	Trafalgar Studios
