= The Creeping (film) =

- Directed by: Jamie Hooper
- Written by: Jamie Hooper
- Produced by: Helen Miles
- Starring: Riann Steele; Jane Lowe; Sophie Thompson; Taliyah Blair; Jonathan Nyati; Peter MacQueen; Phillipa Peak; David Horovitch
- Cinematography: Ben Heckling
- Music by: Stephanie Taylor
- Production company: Cryptoscope Films
- Release date: 1 May 2022 (Panic Fest)
- Country: United Kingdom
- Language: English

The Creeping, is a 2022 British horror film directed by Jamie Hooper, starring Riann Steele and Jane Lowe.

== Cast ==
- Riann Steele as Anna Reynolds
  - Taliyah Blair as Young Anna
- Jane Lowe as Lucy Blakely
  - Phillipa Peak as Young Lucy
- Sophie Thompson as Karen Marrow
- Jonathan Nyati as Harry Reynolds
- Peter MacQueen as William Blakeley
- David Horovitch as Reverend Joseph

== Release ==
The film premiered at Panic Fest on 1 May 2022.

== Reception ==
Michelle Swope of the Daily Dead rated the film 3.5 stars out of 5, writing "Boasting a great cast and marvelous nostalgic scares, The Creeping skillfully succeeds at telling a spellbinding and frightening ghost story." Chad Collins of Dread Central rated the film 3 stars out of 5, calling it "a delightful, throwback ghost story that perhaps leans too heavily on its haunted past." John Dotson of GameRant rated the film 3 stars out of 5. The film received positive reviews in Horror Obsessive and Screen Zealots.
