= Richard Holian =

British actor

Richard Holian (born 1975) is a Leeds-born actor most famous for playing the title role in the BBC children's television programme Jonny Briggs, that ran for two series in 1985 and 1986.

He subsequently had roles in:

- All Creatures Great and Small
- Emmerdale
- Heartbeat
- Wives and Daughters
- At Home with the Braithwaites
- Children's Ward

Following his acting career Holian moved into banking. In January 2017 he appeared in a children's television special edition of quiz show Pointless Celebrities, alongside his Jonny Briggs co-star Sue Devaney.
