= Riann Steele =

British actress (born 1987)

- Born: 23 May 1987 (age 39); Brooklyn, New York, U.S.
- Education: Arts Educational Schools, London
- Occupation: Actress
- Years active: 2009–present
- Children: 2

Riann Steele is a British actress. She began her career in theatre. Her films include Treacle Jr. (2010), Sket (2011), and The Creeping (2022). On television, she starred in the E4 comedy Crazyhead (2016) and the NBC series Debris (2021).

She had recurring roles in the BBC medical soap Holby City (2009–2010) and the Channel 4 sitcom Lovesick (2014–2016), and season 5 of the Syfy series The Magicians (2020).

== Early life ==
Steele was born in Brooklyn and grew up in Ealing, West London. She studied at the Arts Educational School (a.k.a. ArtsEd).

== Career ==
After completing her studies, Steele appeared in various Royal Shakespeare Company productions, including A Midsummer Night's Dream, Love's Labours Lost and Hamlet (including its subsequent BBC television film adaptation in 2009) alongside David Tennant. From 2009 to 2010, she played Nurse Lauren Minster in Holby City. Her first feature film role was opposite Aidan Gillen in Treacle Jr., released in 2010. In 2012, she starred in the film Sket as Shaks, the girlfriend of a violent gang leader portrayed by Ashley Walters, and in Doctor Who (series 7) as Queen Nefertiti. She has also appeared as Cleo, a therapist, in the Channel 4/Netflix comedy series Lovesick and also appeared as Sydney Halliday in four episodes of NCIS: New Orleans Season 4.

In 2021, Steele played the role of Finola Jones in the short lived NBC drama Debris.

== Personal life ==
Steele has two children, twin daughters born in October 2022.

== Select filmography ==
Year	Title	Role	Notes
2009	Hamlet	Lady-in-waiting	Film
2009–2010	Holby City	Lauren Minster	12 episodes
2010	Pete versus Life	N/A	Episode: "Marriage of Convenience"
2010	Treacle Jr.	Linda	Film
2011	360	Waitress	Film
2011	Sket	Shaks	Film
2011	Death in Paradise	Abigail Lightfoot	Episode: "An Unhelpful Aid"
2012	Sadie J	Daisy	Episodes: "Pixiepopalistic: Parts 1 and 2"
2012	Doctor Who	Nefertiti	Episode: "Dinosaurs on a Spaceship"
2013	Misfits	Naomi	Episode 5.4
2014–2016	Lovesick	Cleo	4 episodes
2016	Crazyhead	Suzanne	Main cast
2018	NCIS: New Orleans	Sydney Halliday	4 episodes
2018	Ant-Man and the Wasp	Catherine Starr	Film
2019	Legacies	Ablah	Episode: "There's a World Where Your Dreams Came True"
2020	The Magicians	Plum Chatwin	Recurring role (season 5)
2021	Debris	Finola Jones	Main cast
