= Leave It to Susan =

1918 film directed by Clarence G. Badger

- Directed by: Clarence G. Badger
- Written by: Rex Taylor; Irma Whipley Taylor
- Produced by: Samuel Goldwyn
- Starring: Madge Kennedy; Wallace MacDonald; Alfred Hollingsworth
- Cinematography: Marcel Le Picard
- Production company: Goldwyn Pictures
- Release date: May 29, 1919 (US)
- Running time: 5 reels
- Country: United States
- Languages: Silent; English intertitles

Leave It to Susan is a 1918 American silent comedy Western film directed by Clarence G. Badger and written by Rex Taylor and Irma Whipley Taylor. The film stars Madge Kennedy, Wallace MacDonald, and Alfred Hollingsworth.

== Cast list ==
- Madge Kennedy as Susan Burbridge
- Wallace MacDonald as Jimmy Dawson
- Alfred Hollingsworth as Pa Burbridge
- Anna Hernandez as Ma Burbridge
- Walter Hiers as Horace Peddingham
- George Kunkel as Two-Gun Smith
- Bill Patton
- William McPherson
- Tuck Reynolds
- Walter Cameron
