= Jonny Briggs =

- Starring: Richard Holian; Leslie Schofield; Jane Lowe; Sue Devaney; Tommy Robinson; Jeremy Austin
- Country of origin: United Kingdom
- No. of episodes: 33

Production
- Running time: 15 minutes

Original release
- Network: BBC1

Jonny Briggs is a Children's BBC kitchen sink realism television programme first broadcast in 1985. It revolves around the exploits of a young boy, the eponymous hero (played by Richard Holian), his pet dog, Razzle, and his eccentric family members: Mam (Jane Lowe) and Dad (Leslie Schofield), older sister Rita (Sue Devaney) and older brothers Albert (Tommy Robinson), and Humph (Humphrey) (Jeremy Austin). Another older sister, Marilyn, is mentioned but never seen. The stories often centre on Jonny's school life.

Previously some of the Jonny Briggs books by Joan Eadington were read on Jackanory.

The programme was filmed in Bradford.

The theme tune "The Acrobat" was composed by J A Greenwood in 1936, and recorded by trombonist Colin Buchanan.

== Cast ==
- Jonny Briggs (Richard Holian)
- Rita Briggs (Sue Devaney)
- Albert Briggs (Tommy Robinson)
- Humphrey Briggs (Jeremy Austin)
- Dad (Leslie Schofield)
- Mam (Jane Lowe)
- Mavis (Debbie Norris)
- Miss Broom (Karen Meagher)
- Mr Box (Harry Beety)
- Mr Hobbs (Simon Chandler)
- Mr Badger (John Forbes-Robertson)
- Pamela Dean (Georgina Lane)
- Jinny (Adele Parry)
- Josie (Rachel Powell)
- Nadine (Abigail Fisher)
- Martin (Dexter Lynch)
- Lily Spencer (Sophie Buckley)
- Peter (Alex Moran)
- Razzle (Fizzy)

== Series guide ==
- Series 1: 13 episodes, broadcast 11 November 1985 – 23 December 1985
- Series 2: 20 episodes, broadcast 10 November 1986 – 20 January 1987
