= Jane Eyre (1910 film) =

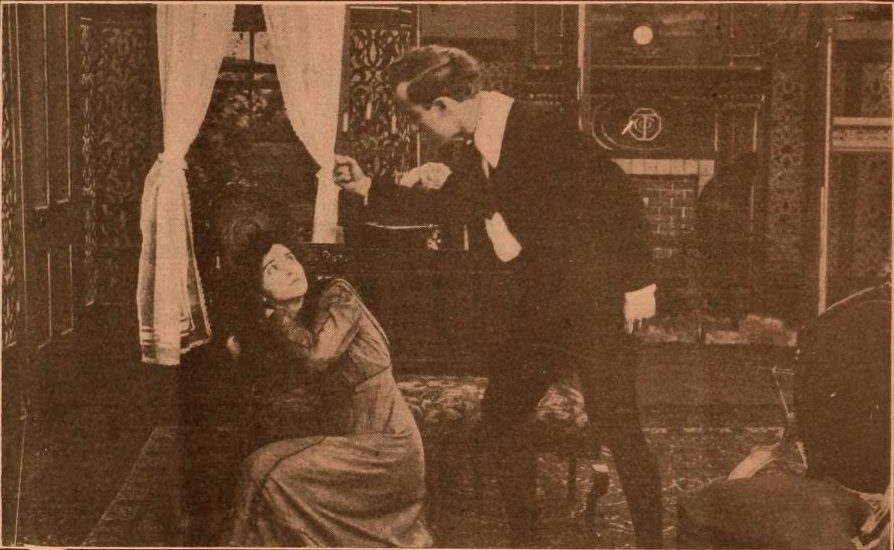
- Irma Taylor as Jane and Charles Compton as John Reed in a film still from the lost work
- Produced by: Thanhouser Company
- Release date: May 6, 1910
- Country: United States
- Languages: Silent film English intertitles

Jane Eyre is a 1910 American silent short classic drama produced by the Thanhouser Film Corporation. (Note: On January 13, 1913, the Thanhouser studio burned. Whether copies of Jane Eyre were incinerated in the event is unknown.) Adapted from Charlotte Brontë's 1847 novel, Jane Eyre, the film mirrors the events and plot of the original book. The writer of the scenario is unknown, but Lloyd Lonergan probably adapted the work. The film's director is often and erroneously claimed to be Theodore Marston, but Barry O'Neil or Lloyd B. Carleton are possible candidates. The cast of the film was credited, an act rare and unusual in the era.

This was the first American, first English language and second or third worldwide movie adaptation, of at least 27 film and television versions – of the novel. (Note: The New York Times erroneously claimed that this was the first of the series (it is apparently the first English language version), while overlooking two Italian versions (one in 1909 and another in 1910) that may predate the 1910 film. The "Enthusiasts' Guide" states: "Jane Eyre (1909) Italian silent film Jane Eyre (1910) Italian silent film Director: Mario Caseini" [Emphasis added.] “It underwent four American film adaptations in 1910, 1914, 1915 and 1921 . . .” At least 18 films and 9 iterations made for television. Cary Fukunaga, "the director of the new movie version of Jane Eyre ... joked recently that there was an unwritten law requiring that Jane Eyre be remade every five years. It sometimes feels that way. Of all the classic 19th-century novels, Charlotte Brontë’s Jane Eyre has been by far the most filmed, outstripping even the ever-durable Pride and Prejudice. [The films] 'sometimes seem to quote from one another as much as from the novel.'” "In 1915 alone, there were at least seven different movie productions of Jane Eyre internationally.") Such repeated dissemination has made the Brontë sisters' two major works ubiquitous. (Note: The "two famous Bronte novels have passed into the general culture, including stage, film and television versions, book illustrations, comic books and paintings, operatic, ballet and musical versions, parodies, allusion, all kinds of incidental references, and also later 're-workings' of the original plot." Art Times reviewer Henry P. Raleigh suggests that it is the most filmed novel. As director Cary Joji Fukunaga noted before directing one on his own: “I was like, holy crap, there are a lot of Jane Eyres out there.")

The single reel film, approximately 1000 feet long, was released on May 6, 1910. It was later credited by Edwin Thanhouser as marking the assured success of the company. The popularity of the production resulted in the production of additional copies, so the Thanhouser company had more orders than could be filled. Critical reception to the film was generally positive, but with some minor criticisms. The film is presumed lost.

== Plot ==
This shortened and streamlined version of Jane Eyre follows the overall themes of the original novel. The condensed events were summarized and the official synopsis was published in The Moving Picture World. It states, "Jane Eyre is left an orphan and penniless at the age of 14. She is adopted by her uncle, who has ample means of providing for her, and who also loves her dearly. Her uncle's kin, however, consider her adoption as an intrusion, do all in their power to prevent her becoming a member of the family. But her uncle insists on her remaining, and during his lifetime she receives some degree of kindness and consideration. Unfortunately, Uncle Reed dies and leaves Jane without a friend in the world. She is sent to an orphan asylum by her unfeeling aunt. Five years later, she leaves the asylum to [accept] the position of governess to Lord Rochester's little niece. The child is the daughter of Rochester's dead brother. Her mother has become insane and is living in Lord Rochester's home, under his protection."

"Jane is engaged by Lord Rochester's housekeeper, during his absence from home, and her first meeting with her employer is both exciting and romantic. She is sitting by the edge of the road reading when Lord Rochester rides up to his ancestral home. The sight of his huge dog, coming upon her suddenly, so startles Jane that she jumps to her feet, causing Lord Rochester's horse to shy and throw its rider. He injures his ankle, and has to be assisted to remount by 'the little witch,' as he calls her, who is the cause of his accident. One evening the maniac escapes from her nurse and sets fire to the room in which Lord Rochester has fallen asleep. He is saved from a horrible death by Jane. When next Jane's haughty aunt and cousins call upon Lord Rochester, they are just in time to be introduced to his bride, who is none other than the despised Jane Eyre."

== Cast ==
- Marie Eline as a young Jane Eyre
- Irma Taylor as adult Jane Eyre
- Gloria Gallop as Georginia Reed
- Frank H. Crane as Lord Rochester (Mr. Rochester in original)
- Amelia Barleon as Mrs. Rochester
- Charles Compton as John Reed
- Martin Faust as Uncle Reed
- Alphonse Ethier
- William Garwood

== Production ==
The scenario for the film was adapted from Charlotte Brontë's 1847 novel Jane Eyre. Brontë's work was modeled after her own life. The book was considered a classic for many decades before the Thanhouser adaptation. The film adaptation was not the first, the earliest known adaption being a 1909 Italian silent film. The writer of the scenario is unknown, but it may have been Lloyd Lonergan. Lonergan was an experienced newspaperman still employed by The New York Evening World while writing scripts for the Thanhouser productions. He was the most important script writer for Thanhouser, averaging 200 scripts a year from 1910 to 1915.

There has been considerable debate over the identity of the film's director. Most commonly, the directional credit is given to Theodore Marston. The apparent origin of this error is from the American Film-Index 1908–1915. Film historian Q. David Bowers consulted one of the co-authors of the book, Gunnar Lundquist, and confirmed that the credit of Marston was in error. Theodore Marston worked with Pathé, Kinemacolor Company of America, Vitagraph and other companies, but there is no record of Marston working with Thanhouser. This error has persisted in the following decade in several publications. Also, I sentieri del cinema: guida per argomenti al primo secolo di film also credits Marston. Among the more prominent citations of Marston's role at Thanhouser is in American Silent Horror, Science Fiction and Fantasy Feature Films, 1913–1929 by John T. Soister. While the director of the film is not known, two Thanhouser directors are possible. Barry O'Neil was the stage name of Thomas J. McCarthy, who would direct many important Thanhouser pictures, including its first two-reeler, Romeo and Juliet. Lloyd B. Carleton was the stage name of Carleton B. Little, a director who would stay with the Thanhouser Company for a short time, moving to Biograph Company by the summer of 1910. Bowers does not attribute either as the director for this particular production nor does Bowers credit a cameraman. Blair Smith was the first cameraman of the Thanhouser company, but he was soon joined by Carl Louis Gregory who had years of experience as a still and motion picture photographer. The role of the cameraman was uncredited in 1910 productions.

Cast in the role of a young Jane Eyre was Marie Eline, soon to be known and famous as the "Thanhouser Kid". Almost nothing is known about Gloria Gallop's role or work in the Thanhouser productions, but she is credited with the minor filler subject, The Cigars His Wife Brought and this film. Frank H. Crane was an early leading man of the Thanhouser company and was already credited in four previous films by the company. Amelia Barleon was a minor actress at Thanhouser with more stage experience. It is unknown how many films she appeared in, but this is credited as her first and The Winter's Tale as her second and last. Charles Compton may have had his film career start in this Thanhouser production, but he was better known for his juvenile roles on the stage. Bowers credits Martin J. Faust as one of the most important actors in for Thanhouser in 1910 and 1911, but Faust's role in productions often went uncredited. Both Irma Taylor and Alphonse Ethier were actors that appeared in Thanhouser productions with few credits. The last identified member of the cast is William Garwood, who was among the most important actors at Thanhouser. He joined the company in late 1909 and remained until 1911 before returning in 1912. This is known as his first credited work with Thanhouser.

== Release and reception ==
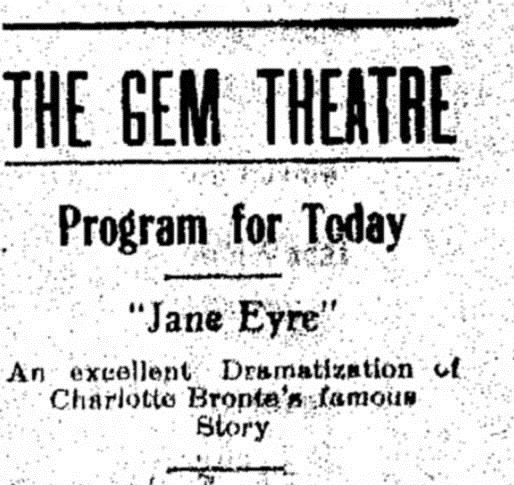
An advertisement in the Moberly Monitor-Index

The single reel film, approximately 1,000 feet (300 m) long, was released on May 6, 1910. Publicity for the release of this film was handled by Bert Adler and was successful in generating trade interest and promised a better work then Thanhouser's St. Elmo from the previous month. The high expectations for the film were picked up and included in subsequent articles in The Moving Picture World and The New York Dramatic Mirror in advance of its release. Also, the players in the production were credited for their work, something which was rare and unusual at the time. Edwin Thanhouser would later mark Jane Eyre as the point in which he became confident in the success of the company. The release saw the new company suddenly having more orders than it could fill and the laboratory had to work overtime to produce additional prints to meet the demand. The popularity of the stage production in advertisements makes identifying the showings of the film more difficult than other Thanhouser productions of the time, but theaters across the nation displayed advertisements for the film. Theaters include Indiana, Kansas, Missouri, and North Carolina.

Jane Eyre helped secure the future of the Thanhouser Company and reviewers were largely positive with only minor criticism about the acting or photography. The Morning Telegraph said the production was excellent save for the lack of emotion displayed over the death of Uncle Reed. There were two reviews of the film in The Moving Picture World, both of which were positive. The first review was positive for its acting and clear adaption, but cautioned itself against further flattery of Edwin Thanhouser's new company. The reviewer noted there were signs of inexperience the company's best work – in the fall from the horse having been depicted as instead as a clumsy dismount. The second review was much more positive, it praised the adaptation and acting, but found the photography to not be of the same standard as its previous work. The film is presumed lost.

== See also ==
- List of American films of 1910
- Adaptations of Jane Eyre
