= Treacle Jr. =

- Film poster
- Directed by: Jamie Thraves
- Written by: Jamie Thraves
- Produced by: Rob Small
- Starring: Aidan Gillen; Tom Fisher; Riann Steele
- Release dates: October 2010 (Dinard); July 11, 2011
- Running time: 85 minutes
- Country: United Kingdom
- Language: English

Treacle Jr. is a 2010 British film written and directed by Jamie Thraves and starring Aidan Gillen, Tom Fisher, and Riann Steele.

== Plot ==
The film opens with Tom eating with his family. He drives to Birmingham, and boards the London train. After walking all day, he sleeps outside a shop. In the morning, he throws his phone into a lake, bins his bank cards (eventually retaining a family photo) but keeps his money. That night, drinking in the park, he is attacked by a gang of youths; fleeing, he runs into a tree, injuring himself. The next morning, waiting in A&E, Aidan behaves disruptively, then starts talking to Tom before Tom is called for examination. When Tom leaves, Aidan follows him.

Walking together, Aidan goes to urinate. Tom, seeing his chance, flees, spots a couple having sex but then runs into Aidan again. When Tom, who is still trying to drop Aidan, faints outside Aidan's flat, and Aidan takes him inside and gives him a beer. Aidan's 'girlfriend' Linda arrives home, surprising Tom, who saw her having sex. She is displeased Aidan made little money, punches him and says to throw Tom out. Tom leaves and tries to buy a tea. Finding his pocket empty, he returns to the flat. Linda denies knowledge of the money, will not let him look for it and smirks as he leaves.

After begging for change successfully, he buys tea in a café. Aidan enters with a cat carrier and offers mousecatching. The manager takes him to the back of the shop, and attacks him. Tom hears the assault and checks his health. Aidan realizes the cat, which belongs to Aidan’s elderly neighbour, is missing. They find it dead and buy a kitten for the cat's owner, who yells at them to leave.

Aidan takes Tom to show him a drum kit he is saving for, having dreams of fame. Tom tells him to leave him alone, admitting he cannot cope with people, including his family. Depressed, Tom takes out the family photo, and finds a bank card, which he uses to withdraw cash. He goes back to Aidan's flat, apologizes, and asks to stay, offering £200. Aidan tells Linda Tom has paid £100 (keeping the rest for his kit), and they celebrate. However Aidan, drunk, tells Linda that he actually received £200 and is saving towards a drum kit. Linda also realizes that Tom is "Mr. Moneybags" and masturbates him.

The next day, Aidan takes Tom to the Horniman Museum and they enjoy making music with the instruments for public use. Aidan later withdraws his savings, but is seen by a man, who may have been following him. As Aidan walks home, the man mugs him. Tom asks for a description and realizes the mugger was Linda's sexual partner. Linda returns home with many designer clothes. Linda, allergic to cats, finds the kitten hidden in the wardrobe and attacks Aidan. When Tom protests, Linda threatens hims with retaliation by her gangster friends. Tom then menaces her with a knife, grabbing her by the throat and demanding she confesses to stealing the money. Frightened, she has an asthma attack. Aidan grabs for her inhaler, but it falls under the fridge. With Linda falling into unconsciousness, they eventually recover it. Aidan kicks her out permanently and suffers her abuse.

Aidan goes to the shop to see the drum kit, but finds it has been sold, which greatly upsets him. He returns home and finds Tom gone, making him more upset. Entering his bedroom, he finds the kit, which Tom has bought for him. The film ends with Aidan drumming and Tom walking to a train station and taking the train home.

== Cast ==
- Tom Fisher as Tom
- Aidan Gillen as Aidan^{a}
- Riann Steele as Linda
- Chris Wade as Drug Dealer (and the man who steals Aidan's money)
- Judy Norman as Clairvoyant
- Carrie Cohen as Mrs Brophy, the elderly neighbour
- Cristina Catalina as Waitress
- Taylan Halici as Café Owner
- Liz Fleming as Ruby
- Spencer Cowan as Honeytrap Thug
- Atli Gunnarsson as Thug
- Lucas Hansen as Thug
- Steven James Tyler as Thug

== Reception ==
Peter Bradshaw of The Guardian gave the film three out of five stars, describing it as a "low-key portrait of a south-east London odd-job man with a big performance by Aidan Gillen, and the return of promising film-maker Jamie Thraves". As of late-2014, it held an 84% positive review on Rotten Tomatoes.

== Notes ==
- Gillen reportedly based the character of Aidan on his long-term acquaintance, musician Aidan Walsh
