= Cockles (TV series) =

1984 British television series

- Genre: Comedy drama
- Written by: Douglas Livingstone
- Directed by: Barry Davis; Tony Virgo
- Starring: Joan Sims; James Grout; Norman Rodway
- Country of origin: United Kingdom
- Original language: English
- No. of series: 1
- No. of episodes: 6

Production
- Producer: Ruth Boswell
- Running time: 55 minutes
- Production company: BBC

Original release
- Network: BBC One
- Release: 4 January – 8 February 1984

Cockles is a 1984 British comedy drama television series which originally aired on BBC One.

== Main cast ==
- James Grout as Arthur Dumpton
- Joan Sims as Gloria du Bois
- Norman Rodway as Jacques du Bois
- Elizabeth Edmonds as Emma
- Jane Lowe as Mabel Gutteridge
- Tim Wylton as George
- Fanny Carby as Madame Rosa
- David Bamber as Graham
- Katie Verner as Elsie

Actors who appeared in individual episodes of the series include Trudie Styler, Tessa Peake-Jones, Perry Benson, John Welsh, Roger Brierley, Albert Moses, Clive Merrison, Judy Holt, Bernard Hepton, Gawn Grainger, Bryan Pringle, Ralph Nossek, Brenda Fricker, Julian Curry, Rowena Cooper, Shirin Taylor, William Simons, Constance Chapman, Julia St John, Sarah Crowden and Tony Selby.

== Bibliography ==
- Jerry Roberts. Encyclopedia of Television Film Directors. Scarecrow Press, 2009.
