= Tom Fisher (actor) =

English actor (born 1968)

- Born: 1968 (age 57–58); Camden, London, England
- Occupation: Actor
- Years active: 1986–present

Tom Browne (born 1968), known professionally as Tom Fisher, is an English actor who has appeared in various films, including The Mummy Returns (2001), Enigma (2001), Shanghai Knights (2003), Van Helsing (2004), The Illusionist (2006), The Young Victoria (2009), Holy Flying Circus (2011), and The King (2019).

Fisher directed the feature film Radiator under his real name Tom Browne.

== Filmography ==
=== Film ===
Year	Title	Role	Notes
1988	Dangerous Love	Brig Bartender	
1990	The Hunt for Red October	Seaman – USS Dallas	
1996	Crimetime	Dempster	
1996	Surviving Picasso	German Officer	
1997	Firelight	Davey	Uncredited
1999	Simon Magus	Thomas	
2000	The Nine Lives of Tomas Katz	No / Tomas Katz	
2001	Enigma	Upjohn	
2001	The Mummy Returns	Jacob Spivey	
2001	The Truth Game	Alan	
2001	Mean Machine	Inmate commentator	
2002	Club Le Monde	Davida	
2003	Shanghai Knights	Artie Doyle	
2004	Van Helsing	Top Hat	
2006	The Illusionist	Willigut	
2006	Amazing Grace	John Ramsay	
2007	Cassandra's Dream	Nigel	
2009	The Young Victoria	Lord Chamberlain	
2010	Treacle Jr.	Tom	
2017	The Current War	Southwick Brown	
2017	Marrowbone	Father	
2019	The King	Northumberland	
2019	Looted	Oswald	

=== Television ===
Year	Title	Role	Notes
1996	Karaoke	Dean	Episode: "Friday"
1998	The Bill	Martin Cookson	Episode: "Deep End"
2000	In Defence	Tony Decker	Episode #1.1
2001	Casualty	Al	2 episodes
2002	Wire in the Blood	Angelica Bain	3 episodes
2003	Foyle's War	Connor	Episode: "War Games"
2005	To the Ends of the Earth	Askew	3 episodes
2005	The Queen's Sister	Greg	Television film
2006	Casualty	Andy Maizels	Episode: "What You See Is What You Get"
2007	Murphy's Law	Billy Driscoll	3 episodes
2007	The Bill	Ben Henley	Episode: "A Model Murder: Part 1"
2007–2009	Kingdom	Ted	9 episodes
2008	The Last Enemy	Andrew Batz	2 episodes
2008	The Middleman		Episode: "The Pilot Episode Sanction"
2008	The Bill	'Death' Jim McManus	Episode: "Second Chance"
2011	Midsomer Murders	Crusty	Episode: "The Oblong Murders"
2011	Holy Flying Circus	Graham Chapman / Tramp	Television film
2012	Treasure Island	Abraham Gray	Television film
2012	Whitechapel	Calvin Mantus	Episode #3.6
2012	New Tricks	Colin Henry	Episode: "Body of Evidence"
2013	Mayday	Seth Docker	5 episodes
2016	The Rack Pack	Pete	Television film
2019	Harlots	Dr. Swinton	2 episodes
