= Westway (TV series) =

1976 British children's TV series

- Country of origin: United Kingdom
- Original language: English
- No. of series: 1
- No. of episodes: 7

Production
- Executive producer: Patrick Dromgoole
- Producer: Leonard White
- Production company: HTV

Original release
- Network: ITV
- Release: 28 April – 9 June 1976

Westway is a British television series was made by HTV for the ITV network and aired for seven episodes between 28 April and 9 June 1976.

The series dealt with the lives of three families living together in a commune (set in a castle) in Bristol, and explored issues of self-sufficiency also addressed by BBC series of the period such as The Good Life and Survivors.

== Cast ==
- Simon Gipps-Kent as Crispin Ryder
- Sylvestra Le Touzel as Samantha Ryder
- Donald Morley as Pete Ryder
- Ann Lynn as Jan Ryder
- Ashley Knight as Phil Saxby
- Nigel Rhodes as Mark Saxby
- Ivor Salter as Len Saxby
- Chris Range as Anna Saxby
- Dean Lawrence as Ron Harvey
- Jane Lowe as Paula Harvey
- Sarah Sutton as Sue Harvey
- Daphne Heard as Miss. Marlbury
- Tim Preece as Graham Lawrence

== Episode list ==
All seven episodes were written by Guy Slater.

| No. | Title | Directed by | Original release date |
|---|---|---|---|
| 1 | "The Saxby Invaders" | Mike Vardy | 28 April 1976 |
| 2 | "A Do-It-Yourself School" | Mike Vardy | 5 May 1976 |
| 3 | "A Growing Concern" | Don Leaver | 12 May 1976 |
| 4 | "Happy Families" | Don Leaver | 19 May 1976 |
| 5 | "Noughts and Crosses" | Leonard White | 26 May 1976 |
| 6 | "A Highly Desirable Property" | Derek Clark | 2 June 1976 |
| 7 | "The Tenant's Feast" | Leonard White | 9 June 1976 |

The series survives complete on 1" videotape as part of the HTV collection which is now held by ITV plc.
