= WriteGirl =

Non-profit that partners writing mentors and mentees

- Founded: 2001
- Founder: Keren Taylor
- Type: Non-Profit 501(c)(3)
- Purpose: Partnering Writing Mentors and Mentees, workshops
- Location: Los Angeles, California
- Region served: Los Angeles, California
- Website: http://www.writegirl.org

WriteGirl is a Los Angeles–based project of Community Partners, founded by Keren Taylor in 2001. Taylor was recognized by CNN as a "CNN Hero" in 2021. The organization's focus is connecting professional women writers in Los Angeles, CA with underserved teenage girls who might not otherwise have access to creative writing or mentoring programs. The mentoring program focuses on creative writing and empowerment through self-expression. WriteGirl Alum Amanda Gorman, was chosen as the Inaugural Poet for the 59th Inaugural Ceremonies on Jan. 20, 2021, when Joe Biden was sworn in as President of the United States. In 2013, WriteGirl was honored by-then first lady, Michelle Obama, with the National Arts and Humanities Youth Program Award.

== WriteGirl Mentorship Program ==
WriteGirl was founded by Keren Taylor in 2001. The program is based on one-on-one mentoring and monthly creative writing workshops where girls are given techniques, insights, and topics for writing in all genres from professional women writers. Workshops and mentoring sessions explore poetry, fiction, creative non-fiction, songwriting, journalism, screenwriting, playwriting, persuasive writing, journal writing, and editing.

- Mentees

WriteGirl's mentees have a high success rate of graduating seniors entering college, many on full or partial scholarships. Many of the mentees come from underserved communities. The WriteGirl program was designed to give girls individualized guidance and the education support providing in-depth college entrance guidance to all Core Mentoring Program high school juniors and seniors and their families.

- In-Schools/Bold Ink Writers Program

WriteGirl's In-Schools Program mentee pregnant, parenting and/or incarcerated girls attending alternative schools by bringing them weekly creative writing workshops. Bold Ink Writers, work with incarcerated and system-involved boys at Los Angeles County juvenile detention camps and day reporting facilities, working in partnership with the Arts for Incarcerated Youth Network (AIYN) and the Los Angeles County Probation Department. Volunteers lead weekly writing sessions designed to improve literacy and communication skills.

- Lights, Camera, WriteGirl

Lights, Camera, WriteGirl is an annual event benefiting WriteGirl and its programming. The event showcases scenes and monologues written by WriteGirl teens, brought to life by a celebrity cast of actors which have included Wendi McLendon-Covey, Seth Rogen, Keiko Agena, Wayne Brady, Angela Bassett, and Kelsey Scott, among others. In 2019, actor, author and WriteGirl volunteer Lauren Graham, emceed the event.

- WriteGirl Bold Ink Awards

WriteGirl hosts the Bold Ink Awards, an annual event honoring women writers who serve as positive role models for teens. Recipients of the Bold Ink Awards include Kara DioGuardi, Sarah Silverman, and Aline Brosh McKenna, among others.
