= Irma Taylor =

American actress

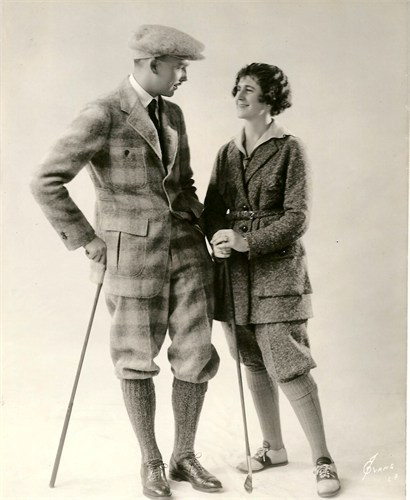
Rex and Irma Taylor

Irma Taylor (14 December 1890 – 17 April 1974) was an American screenwriter and actress of the silent era notable for playing Jane Eyre in Jane Eyre (1910), the English language film of the novel of the same name.

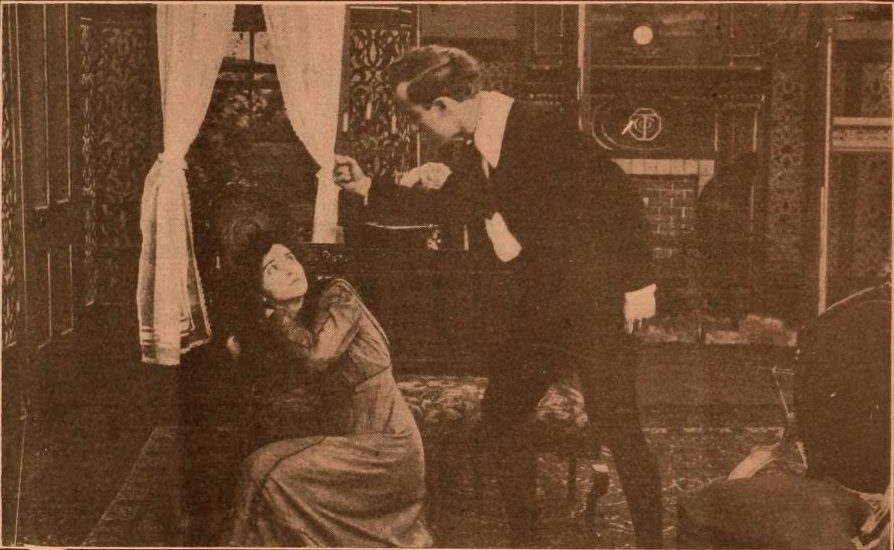
Irma Taylor as Jane and Charles Compton as John Reed in Jane Eyre (1910)

Born in Michigan in the United States in 1890 as Irma Whepley, the daughter of Dora Alice Smith née Beardsley and William Long Whepley, she married the screenwriter Rex Allison Taylor in about 1910. The marriage was later dissolved, following which she married George Fife, which lasted until her death. She was an actress with the Thanhouser Company for whom she appeared in various films released from 1910 through 1912. In the latter year she went to St. Augustine with the Thanhouser players.

With the Thanhouser Company she played the title role in Jane Eyre (1910) and appeared in The Lady from the Sea (1911), and as Ustane in She (1911). She provided the story to the screenplay by her husband for the films The Menace (1918), The Other Man (1918), Leave It to Susan (1919) and They Like 'Em Rough (1922). In 1944, to a melody by her relative Harry James Beardsley she wrote the lyrics to the published song "All of my heart went with you".

She died in Glendale in California in 1974.
