= Tina Heath =

British actress and former television presenter

Tina Heath (born 1953) is a British actress and former television presenter.

== Early career ==
Her first television appearance was in 1969, when she appeared in Broaden Your Mind on BBC 2 alongside Graeme Garden and Tim Brooke-Taylor. A one-off appearance in Z-Cars followed in 1970. She appeared in the Look and Read serial Cloud Burst in 1974.

== Lizzie Dripping ==
In 1973, she played the title role in the children's television serial Lizzie Dripping after first playing the character in an episode of Jackanory Playhouse in 1972. Her character was supposed to be 12 years old, but in fact Heath was already 20 at the time.

== Further television appearances ==
The BBC serial production of Jane Eyre, (1973), followed, and Heath played the character of Helen Burns, the fourteen-year-old boarding-school girl who is cruelly birched by Miss Scatcherd, and who befriends the ten-year-old Jane when Jane is a newcomer to Lowood Institute.

Other television appearances included a BBC Play of the Month production of The Linden Tree by J.B. Priestley, in September 1974; Crown Court, (Regina versus McDowell), 1974, (which replaced 'The Traffic Warden's Daughter', which wasn't originally aired); Churchill's People in 1975; Muriel Spark's The Girls Of Slender Means; and The Sweeney, in 1976.

== The Sunday Gang ==
Her first television presentational role was on BBC 1's The Sunday Gang which ran from August 1976 on Sunday mornings, a role that continued for two years, where she met her future husband, Dave Cooke, who worked as musical director on the show. (Cooke took part in the 1981 A Song for Europe contest as part of the group 'Headache', placing 7th of the 8th entrants.) Heath continued to act during this period, appearing in BBC Two's Maiden's Trip in 1977.

== Blue Peter ==
On 5 April 1979, she joined the children's series, Blue Peter, and left on 23 June 1980 to have her daughter, Jemma Victoria Cooke. She was the first incumbent Blue Peter presenter to become pregnant. During her 14-month stint, she had an ultrasound scan live on television and climbed to the top of Westminster Abbey, while heavily pregnant.

In 1981, she returned to Blue Peter, to model corsets alongside her successor, Sarah Greene. In 2001, she appeared in the special Blue Peter pantomime Rock n' Roll Christmas, where she played the role of 'Miss Dripping'.

== Personal life ==
Heath and her husband Dave Cooke have two children and four grandchildren. During the COVID-19 pandemic, they set up the podcast The Home Service.
