= German American Partnership Program =

Department of State, Bureau of Educational and Cultural Affairs

The German American Partnership Program (GAPP) is a high school exchange program between schools in the United States and Germany, sponsored by the German Foreign Office and the U.S. Department of State's Bureau of Educational and Cultural Affairs. Organizational support is provided by the Goethe-Institut. The program was started in 1977 . Over 200,000 students have participated in the program .

An exchange in this program is organized by two schools which enter into a long-term partnership. Each exchange itself, however, is defined as a short-term exchange. Students from the partner schools are eligible to participate in the annual or bi-annual school visits. These last between three and four weeks each. According to the program rules, 10 to 20 students from each school can participate and are accompanied by teachers from their home schools.
