= Brightly Burning =

2018 novel by Alexa Donne

- First edition
- Author: Alexa Donne
- Language: English
- Genre: Young adult fiction
- Publisher: HMH Books
- Publication date: 2018-03-01
- Publication place: US
- Media type: print
- Pages: 400
- ISBN: 978-1-328-94893-9
- Followed by: The Stars We Steal
- Website: https://alexadonne.com/books/brightly-burning/

Brightly Burning is a 2018 novel by Alexa Donne, an American young adult sci-fi and thriller author. The novel is frequently described as a retelling or reimagining of Jane Eyre.

== Plot ==
Brightly Burning and the companion novel The Stars We Steal (published February 2020) are set in the far future, when humanity has fled Earth due to an Ice Age, living instead in orbit on spaceships. Pitched as Jane Eyre in space, Brightly Burning follows seventeen-year-old engineer Stella Ainsley, who lives on the Stalwart, one of the oldest and poorest ships in the fleet. Wishing to escape the Stalwart, Stella is hired on as a governess on the private ship, the Rochester, captained by the young and handsome Hugo Fairfax, who has a secret that could threaten the safety of the entire fleet.

== Reception ==
Before release, Entertainment Weekly called it "one of the most anticipated YA debuts of 2018". According to Publishers Weekly, it's an "entertaining, loose adaptation of Brontë’s classic novel" (referring to Jane Eyre) with "solid sci-fi worldbuilding, creative details, and a diverse cast," though they criticized lack of development of the heroine’s childhood and the social criticism the story intends to deliver. Kirkus Reviews called it "a gripping examination of class, romance, and survival."
