= Graham Greene bibliography =

Bibliography of English novelist

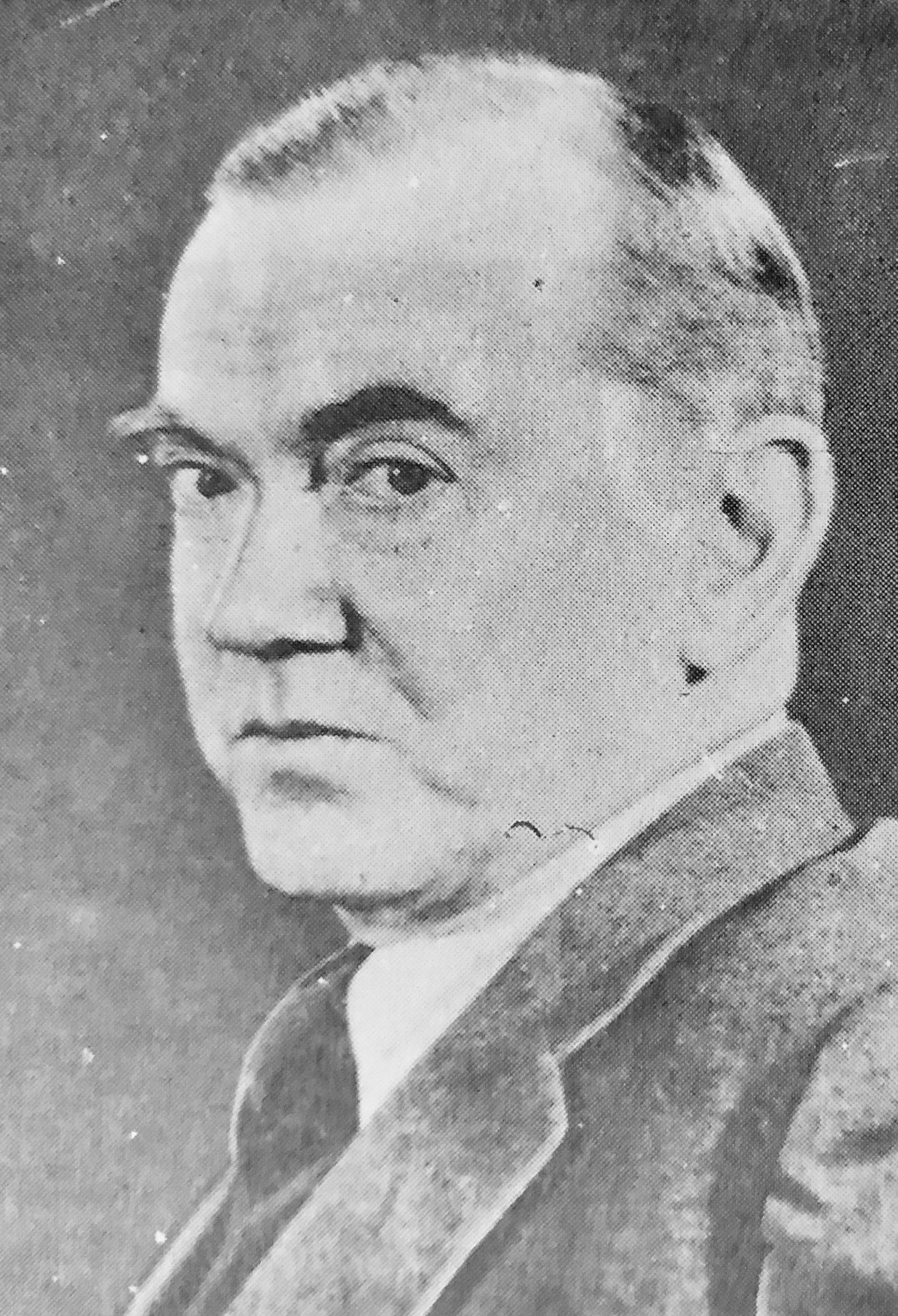
Greene in 1963

Graham Greene (1904–1991) was an English novelist regarded by many as one of the greatest writers of the 20th century. Combining literary acclaim with widespread popularity, Greene acquired a reputation early in his lifetime as a major writer, both of serious Catholic novels, and of thrillers (or "entertainments" as he termed them). He was shortlisted, in 1966 and 1967, for the Nobel Prize for Literature. He produced 26 novels, as well as several plays, autobiographies, and short stories.

== Novels ==
- The Man Within (Heinemann, 1929)
- The Name of Action (Heinemann, 1930) (repudiated by author, never re-published)
- Rumour at Nightfall (Heinemann, 1931) (repudiated by author, never re-published)
- Stamboul Train (Heinemann, 1932) (also published as Orient Express)
- It's a Battlefield (Heinemann, 1934)
- England Made Me (Heinemann, 1935) (also published as The Shipwrecked)
- A Gun for Sale (Heinemann, 1936) (also published as This Gun for Hire)
- Brighton Rock (Heinemann, 1938)
- The Confidential Agent (Heinemann, 1939)
- The Power and the Glory (Heinemann, 1940) (also published as The Labyrinthine Ways)
- The Ministry of Fear (Heinemann, 1943)
- The Heart of the Matter (Heinemann, 1948)
- The Third Man (1949) (novella, as a basis for the screenplay)
- The End of the Affair (Heinemann, 1951)
- The Quiet American (Heinemann, 1955)
- Loser Takes All (Heinemann, 1955)
- Our Man in Havana (Heinemann, 1958)
- A Burnt-Out Case (Heinemann, 1960)
- The Comedians (The Bodley Head, 1966)
- Travels with My Aunt (The Bodley Head, 1969)
- The Honorary Consul (The Bodley Head, 1973)
- The Human Factor (The Bodley Head, 1978)
- Doctor Fischer of Geneva or The Bomb Party (The Bodley Head, 1980)
- Monsignor Quixote (Bodley Head, 1982)
- The Tenth Man (The Bodley Head and Anthony Blond, 1985)
- The Captain and the Enemy (Reindhart Books, 1988)

== Short stories ==
- "The Bear Fell Free" (1935)
- Twenty-One Stories (Heinemann, 1954) (originally The Basement Room (Cresset Press, 1935) with 8 stories; then Nineteen Stories (Heinemann, 1947) adding 11 new stories; then Twenty-One Stories [1954] adding 4 new stories and removing 2 previous)

1. "The End of the Party" (1929)
2. "The Second Death" (1929)
3. "Proof Positive" (1930)
4. "I Spy" (1930)
5. "A Day Saved" (1934)
6. "Jubilee" (1936)
7. "Brother" (1936)
8. "A Chance For Mr Lever" (1936)
9. "The Basement Room" (1936) (adapted by the author as The Fallen Idol, a film directed by Carol Reed)
10. "The Innocent" (1937)
11. "A Drive in the Country" (1937)
12. "Across the Bridge" (1938)
13. "A Little Place Off the Edgware Road" (1939)
14. "The Case for the Defence" (1939)
15. "Alas, Poor Maling" (1940)
16. "Men at Work" (1940)
17. "When Greek Meets Greek" (1941) (elsewhere retitled "Her Uncle Versus His Father")
18. "The Hint of an Explanation" (1948)
19. "The Blue Film" (1954)
20. "Special Duties" (1954) (elsewhere retitled "A Peculiar Affair of Westbourne Grove")
21. "The Destructors" (1954)

- A Visit to Morin (Heinemann, 1960)
- A Sense of Reality (The Bodley Head, 1963)

1. "Under the Garden"
2. "A Visit to Morin" (previously published in a limited edition)
3. "Dream of a Strange Land"
4. "A Discovery in the Woods"

- May We Borrow Your Husband? (The Bodley Head, 1967)

1. "May We Borrow Your Husband?"
2. "Beauty"
3. "Chagrin in Three Parts"
4. "The Over-night Bag"
5. "Mortmain"
6. "Cheap in August"
7. "A Shocking Accident"
8. "The Invisible Japanese Gentlemen"
9. "Awful When You Think of It"
10. "Doctor Crombie"
11. "The Root of All Evil"
12. "Two Gentle People"

- Collected Stories (The Bodley Head & William Heinemann, 1972) (including May We Borrow Your Husband?, A Sense of Reality, and Twenty-One Stories)
- How Father Quixote Became a Monsignor (Sylvester & Orphanos, 1980) (later becoming the first chapter of the novel Monsignor Quixote [1982])
- "The New House" (Eurographica, 1988)
- The Last Word and Other Stories (Reindhart Books, 1990)

1. "The Last Word"
2. "The News in English"
3. "The Moment of Truth"
4. "The Man Who Stole the Eiffel Tower"
5. "The Lieutenant Died Last"
6. "A Branch of the Service"
7. "An Old Man's Memory"
8. "The Lottery Ticket"
9. "The New House" (previously published in a limited edition)
10. "Work Not in Progress"
11. "Murder for the Wrong Reason"
12. "An Appointment With the General"

- The Complete Short Stories (Penguin Books, 2005) (adding The Last Word, and adding or reinstating 4 stories, to Collected Stories)

1. "The Blessing" (1966)
2. "Church Militant" (1956)
3. "Dear Dr Falkenheim" (1963)
4. "The Other Side of the Border" (1936 unfinished novel originally published in Nineteen Stories [1947])

- No Man's Land (Hesperus Press, 2005) (a film story, posthumously published with an incomplete film story, The Stranger's Hand)

== Plays ==
- The Great Jowett (1939, radio play)
- The Living Room (1953)
- The Potting Shed (1957)
- The Complaisant Lover (1959)
- Carving a Statue (1964)
- The Return of A.J. Raffles (1975)
- Yes and No (1980)
- For Whom the Bell Chimes (1980)

== Screenplays ==
- The Future's in the Air (1937, short)
- The New Britain (1940, short)
- 21 Days (1940, based on the play The First and the Last by John Galsworthy)
- Brighton Rock (1947)
- The Fallen Idol (1948)
- The Third Man (1949)
- Loser Takes All (1956)
- Saint Joan (1957, based on the play by Bernard Shaw)
- Our Man in Havana (1959)
- The Comedians (1967)
- Monsignor Quixote (1985)

== Verse ==
- Babbling April (Basil Blackwell, 1925)
- A Quick Look Behind: Footnotes to an Autobiography (Sylvester & Orphanos, 1983)

== Nonfiction ==
=== Autobiography ===
- A Sort of Life (The Bodley Head, 1971)
- Ways of Escape (The Bodley Head, 1980)
- Getting To Know The General: The Story of an Involvement (Simon & Schuster, 1984)
- A World of My Own: A Dream Diary (Reindhart Books, 1992)

=== Travel books ===
- Journey Without Maps (Heinemann, 1936)
- The Lawless Roads (Longmans, 1939; published as Another Mexico in the United States)
- In Search of a Character: Two African Journals (The Bodley Head, 1961)
- A Weed Among the Flowers (Sylvester & Orphanos, 1990)

=== Essays and criticism ===
- British Dramatists (1942)
- The Lost Childhood and Other Essays (1951)
- Collected Essays (1969)
- The Pleasure-Dome: The Collected Film Criticism, 1935–40 (ed. John Russell Taylor, 1980)
- J'Accuse: The Dark Side of Nice (1982)
- Yours, etc.: Letters to the Press (1989)
- Reflections (1991)
- The Graham Greene Film Reader: Reviews, Essays, Interviews and Film Stories (ed. David Parkinson, 1993, also published as Mornings in the Dark: The Graham Greene Film Reader)
- Articles of Faith: The Collected Tablet Journalism of Graham Greene (ed. Ian Thomson, 2006)

=== Biography ===
- Lord Rochester's Monkey: Being the Life of John Wilmot, Second Earl of Rochester (1974)
- An Impossible Woman: The Memories of Dottoressa Moor of Capri (ed. Greene, 1975)

=== Other non-fiction ===
- The Old School: Essays by Divers Hands (ed. Greene, 1934)
- Why Do I Write? An Exchange of Views between Elizabeth Bowen, Graham Greene and V.S. Pritchett (1948)
- The Spy's Bedside Book (ed. with Hugh Greene, 1957)
- Reflections on Travels With My Aunt (1989)
- Why the Epigraph? (1989)
- Graham Greene: A Life in Letters (ed. Richard Greene, 2007)

== Children's books ==
- The Little Train (1946, illus. Dorothy Craigie; 1973, illus. Edward Ardizzone)
- The Little Fire Engine (1950, illus. Dorothy Craigie; 1973, illus. Edward Ardizzone)
- The Little Horse Bus (1952, illus. Dorothy Craigie; 1974, illus. Edward Ardizzone)
- The Little Steamroller (1953, illus. Dorothy Craigie; 1974, illus. Edward Ardizzone)
