= Immodest Proposals =

2001 collection of science fiction stories by William Tenn

- The cover of the first hardcover edition
- Author: William Tenn, Edited by Mary Tabasko and James A. Mann
- Cover artist: H. R. Van Dongen
- Language: English
- Series: The Complete Science Fiction of William Tenn
- Genre: Science fiction
- Publisher: NESFA Press
- Publication date: February 2001
- Publication place: United States
- Media type: Print (hardback)
- Pages: 618
- ISBN: 1-886778-19-1
- OCLC: 47205614
- Followed by: Here Comes Civilization

Immodest Proposals is a collection of 33 science fiction stories by British-American writer William Tenn, the first of two volumes presenting Tenn's complete body of science fiction writings. It features an introduction by Connie Willis. Tenn provides afterwords to each story, describing how they came to be written.

== Contents ==
- Bernie the Scheherazade by Connie Willis
- "Firewater" - novella - Astounding, Feb. 1952
- "Lisbon Cubed" - novelette - Galaxy, Oct. 1958
- "The Ghost Standard" - short story - Playboy, Dec. 1994
- "The Flat-Eyed Monster" - novelette - Galaxy, Aug. 1955
- "The Deserter" - short story - Star Science Fiction Stories #1, ed. Frederik Pohl, Ballantine, 1953
- "Venus and the Seven Sexes" - novelette - The Girl With the Hungry Eyes, ed. Donald A. Wollheim, Avon, 1949
- "Party of the Two Parts" - novelette - Galaxy, Aug. 1954
- "The Liberation of Earth" - short story - Future Science Fiction, May 1953
- "Eastward Ho!" - short story - F&SF, Oct. 1958
- "Null-P" - short story - Worlds Beyond, Jan. 1951
- "The Masculinist Revolt" - novelette - F&SF, Aug. 1965
- "Brooklyn Project" - short story - Planet Stories, Fall 1948
- "Child's Play" - novelette - Astounding March 1947
- "Wednesday's Child" - short story - Fantastic Universe, Jan. 1956
- "My Mother Was a Witch" - P.S., Aug. 1966
- "The Lemon-Green Spaghetti-Loud Dynamite-Dribble Day ("Did Your Coffee Taste Funny This Morning?") - short story - Cavalier, Jan. 1967
- "The Tenants" - short story - F&SF, April 1954
- "Generation of Noah ("The Quick and the Bomb") - short story - Suspense, Spring 1951
- "Down Among the Dead Men" - novelette - Galaxy, June 1954
- "Time in Advance" - novelette - Galaxy, Aug. 1956
- "The Sickness" - novelette - Infinity Science Fiction, Nov. 1955
- "The Servant Problem" - novelette - Galaxy, April 1955
- "A Man of Family" - short story - The Human Angle, Ballantine, 1956
- "The Jester" - short story - Thrilling Wonder Stories, Aug. 1951
- "Project Hush" - short story - Galaxy, Feb. 1954
- "Winthrop Was Stubborn" ("Time Waits for Winthrop") - novella - Galaxy, Aug. 1957
- "The Dark Star" - short story - Galaxy, Sep. 1957
- "Consulate" - short story - Thrilling Wonder Stories, June 1948
- "The Last Bounce" - novelette - Fantastic Adventures, Sep. 1950
- "Venus Is a Man's World" - novelette - Galaxy, July 1951
- "Alexander the Bait" - short story - Astounding May 1946
- "The Custodian" - novelette - If, Nov. 1953
- "On Venus, Have We Got a Rabbi" - novelette - Wandering Stars, ed. Jack M. Dann, Harper, 1974

== See also ==
- A Modest Proposal
