= Across the Bridge =

Across the Bridge may refer to:

- "Across the Bridge" (short story), a 1938 short story by Graham Greene
- Across the Bridge (film), a 1957 British film, based on the short story
- "Across the Bridge" (Australian Playhouse), a 1966 Australian television play by Liane Keen
