= Henrey =

Henrey is a surname. Notable people with the surname include:

- Blanche Henrey (1906–1983), English botanical writer and bibliographer
- Bobby Henrey (born 1939), Anglo-French actor
- Madeleine Henrey (1906–2004), French-born writer

== Other uses ==
- Henrey Automobile, a Chinese electric automaker

== See also ==
- Henry (surname)
