= Children of Wonder =

1953 anthology of science fiction and fantasy stories edited by William Tenn

- First edition
- Editor: William Tenn
- Language: English
- Genre: Science fiction, fantasy
- Publisher: Simon & Schuster
- Publication date: 1953
- Publication place: United States
- Media type: Print (hardback & paperback)
- Pages: xiv + 336
- OCLC: 28803491

Children of Wonder is an anthology of science fiction and fantasy stories edited by William Tenn, published in hardcover by Simon & Schuster in 1953. It was reprinted in paperback in 1954 by Permabooks, under the title Outsiders: Children of Wonder. The only anthology edited by Tenn, its stories feature children with superhuman or supernatural talents.

== Contents ==
- "Introduction", William Tenn
- "The Rocking-Horse Winner", D. H. Lawrence (The Ghost Book 1926)
- "The Words of Guru", Cyril M. Kornbluth (Stirring Science Stories 1941)
- "Baby Is Three", Theodore Sturgeon (Galaxy 1952)
- "The Small Assassin", Ray Bradbury (Dime Mystery Magazine 1946)
- "The Story of a Panic", E. M. Forster (Independent Review 1904)
- "The Piper’s Son", Henry Kuttner & C. L. Moore (Astounding 1945)
- "Miriam", Truman Capote (Mademoiselle 1945)
- "Adam and Eve and Pinch Me", A. E. Coppard (Adam and Eve and Pinch Me 1921)
- "Child’s Play", Alice Mary Schnirring (Weird Tales 1942)
- "The Open Window", Saki (Westminster Gazette 1911)
- "The End of the Party", Graham Greene (London Mercury 1932)
- "The Idol of the Flies", Jane Rice (Unknown 1942)
- "That Only a Mother", Judith Merril (Astounding 1948)
- "Born of Man and Woman", Richard Matheson (F&SF 1950)
- "Keyhole", Murray Leinster (Thrilling Wonder Stories 1951)
- "Terminal Quest", Poul Anderson (Super Science Stories 1951)
- "The Origin of the Species", Katherine MacLean (original)
- "In Hiding", Wilmar H. Shiras (Astounding 1948)
- "The Hatchery," Aldous Huxley (Brave New World 1932)
- "Errand Boy," William Tenn (Astounding 1947)
- "Nightmare for Future Reference", Stephen Vincent Benét (Scholastic 1938)

"The Words of Guru" originally carried the "Kenneth Falconer" byline. "The Piper's Son" originally carried the "Lewis Padgett" byline.

== Reception ==
P. Schuyler Miller reviewed the anthology favorably in Astounding, saying it included "both top-notch stories and good but routine items, fairly representative of the field."
