= The Wonder Kid =

- Directed by: Karl Hartl
- Written by: Gene Markey; Karl Hartl
- Produced by: Karl Hartl
- Starring: Bobby Henrey; Elwyn Brook-Jones; Muriel Aked; Oskar Werner
- Cinematography: Günther Anders; Robert Krasker
- Edited by: Reginald Beck
- Music by: Willy Schmidt-Gentner
- Production company: London Films
- Distributed by: British Lion Films
- Release date: 26 May 1952
- Running time: 85 minutes
- Country: United Kingdom
- Language: English
- Box office: £79,912 (UK)

The Wonder Kid (also known as Wonder Boy and Wonder Child) is a 1952 British drama film directed by Karl Hartl and starring Bobby Henrey, Elwyn Brook-Jones and Oskar Werner. It was written by Gene Markey and Hartl.

== Plot ==
Sebastian Giro is a ten-year-old French boy and child musical prodigy found in an orphanage by Mr Gorik who exploits the youngster’s talent as a classical pianist and turns him into an international celebrity. He tells everyone that the boy is only seven years old to make the boy's talent seem more remarkable.

But Gorik is also a crook who embezzles the takings so that he has almost all the money and Sebastian gets hardly any. Gorik won’t allow Sebastian to enjoy the simple pleasures of being a little boy, like playing with other boys or even reading comic books, because, when Sebastian is not performing, Gorik is not making any money out of him. He works the over tired boy like a slave who must continually practice on the piano.

Sebastian’s elderly English governess, Miss Frisbie is very concerned about the boy and confronts Gorik about his crooked activities. But he dismisses her from her post. Miss Frisbie then pays a gang of crooks to "kidnap" Sebastian and take him to stay in a remote lodge in the Austrian Tyrol, where the boy has never been so free and happy and Gorik will not get him back until he pays a huge ransom which is, in effect, all the money he has stolen from the boy.

== Cast ==
- Bobby Henrey as Sebastian Giro
- Elwyn Brook-Jones as Mr. Gorik
- Muriel Aked as Miss Frisbie
- Oskar Werner as Rudi
- Robert Shackleton as Rocks Cooley
- Christa Winter as Anni
- Sebastian Cabot as Pizzo
- Klaus Birsch as Nik
- Paul Hardtmuth as Professor Bindl
- June Elvin]as Miss Kirsch

== Production ==
The Wonder Kid was filmed on location in Austria and at Isleworth Studios in England in late 1949 and early 1950, but not released until 1952. The film's sets were designed by the art directors Joseph Bato and Werner Schlichting.

== Reception ==
The Monthly Film Bulletin wrote: "The story is too simple for the framework of the film, and the Austrian director never appears to have a firm grip on his own screenplay. The interlude in the chateau where Sebastian is learning to throw a ball, swim and play with a dog is incredibly drawn out, the point of the story is obscured and the climax so long delayed that one cares little for his ultimate fate. His character – that of an effeminate, precocious little prig – calls for little sympathy, however, and Bobby Henrey's playing of the part is much inferior to his performance in The Fallen Idol. The other players have few chances with their novelettish, one sided characters. Some of the photography is excellent, but too reminiscent of a travelogue. The film, incidentally, has been made in two versions, English and German."

Kine Weekly wrote: "The picture is nothing like The Fallen Idol, but even so it is a challenge to Bobby Henrey, who distinguished himself in that dazzling opus. Unfortunately for the lad, director-cum-author Karl Hartl is no Carol Reed nor Graham Greene. Innocuous hue and cry, staged in the Austrian Tyrol, the film has little to support it apart from its scenic splendour."

Picturegoer wrote: "Silly tale about a famous child pianist who is handed to a gang of international crooks by his governess because his manager is cheating him of the money he earns. As virtuoso Sebastian Giro, Bobby Henrey retains some of his Fallen Idol promise – except when he plays the piano; in these sequences his expression suggests he is playing nothing more musical than trains. His emotional Continental manager (Elwyn Brook-Jones) can't, apparently, make up his mind whether he's in the concert world or burlesque business. Muriel Aked, as the governess, tries hard with some inane lines. However, Robert Shackleton, the kindhearted American who joins the gang after leaving America in a hurry, is first rate."

Picture Show wrote: "Fresh, wholesome, comedy drama."
