= The End of the Party =

The End of the Party may refer to:

- The End of the Party (book), a book by British political journalist Andrew Rawnsley
- The End of the Party (short story), a short story by the English writer Graham Greene
