= Stamboul Train =

1932 novel by Graham Greene

- First edition
- Author: Graham Greene
- Cover artist: Youngman Carter
- Language: English
- Genre: Novel
- Publisher: William Heinemann
- Publication date: 1932
- Publication place: United Kingdom
- Media type: Hardcover (first edition)
- Pages: 307 (first edition)

Stamboul Train is the second significant novel by Graham Greene. Set on a train journey from Ostend to Istanbul, the book was renamed Orient Express when it was published in the United States. The novel appeared in 1932 and was Greene's first true success. It was taken on by the Book Society and in 1934 adapted as the film Orient Express.

== Introduction ==
Stamboul Train is one of a number that the author classed as an "entertainment". But though some elements in the novel have been described as "melodramatic incidents that could find a place in the most conventional of thrillers", Greene's aim is to use them to go beyond their basic paradigm in order "to produce work that can be taken as art while also reaching a large audience".

His book followed two unsuccessful novels that Greene later disowned, The Name of Action (1930) and Rumour at Nightfall (1932). Writing in his autobiography, he describes how "for the first and last time in my life I deliberately set out to write a book to please, one which with luck might be made into a film". Among the preparations for writing his book, he mentions taking notes on a train journey to Cologne – "you may be sure the allotments outside Bruges were just where I placed them in April, 1931". He also plotted key scenes in which the characters were to be established through dialogue and he put himself in the mood by daily playing Arthur Honegger's "Pacific 231" on his gramophone at home.

The characters include a businessman, a lesbian, and a revolutionary intellectual. The character of a self-regarding popular author Q. C. Savory got Greene into trouble even before the book appeared. J. B. Priestley was given a review copy and, coming to the conclusion that Savory was based upon him, threatened a libel suit and also to leave their joint publisher, Heinemann. Greene was therefore forced to make changes that involved the replacement of some twenty pages.

== Plot summary ==
The novel focuses on the lives of individuals aboard a luxury express making a three-day journey from Ostend to Istanbul (although Greene uses the old name for the city, Constantinople). The novel opens on board the ferry, on which several of the novel's major characters have travelled from England. Mabel Warren and Janet Pardoe join the train later in Cologne and Josef Grünlich joins it in Vienna. Although these characters are travelling for different purposes, their lives are intertwined in the course of the journey. Other scenes in places through which the train passes are also described, as well as Carleton Myatt's high-speed journey by car through the snow-laden countryside to and from the railway station at Subotica.

A major part of the plot focuses on Myatt, a shrewd and practical businessman who trades in currants and has business interests in Istanbul. He is travelling because he is concerned that the firm's agent in Turkey, Eckman, has been cheating him. As he crosses interwar Europe, Myatt has to face antisemitic attitudes, both on and off the train. Because he feels sorry for the sick dancer Coral Musker, who is travelling second class to join a show in Turkey, he buys her a first class ticket. The grateful Coral falls in love with him and spends the night in his compartment, during which, to his surprise, he discovers that she is a virgin. After she disappears from the train at Subotica he travels back to rescue her, but fails and barely escapes after rescuing the crook Grünlich under gun fire.

Dr. Czinner is an escaped communist leader and former physician, travelling on a forged British passport after five years teaching in an English boys' school. He plans on leading a communist revolution in Belgrade, but discovers that the uprising has taken place too early and failed. Nonetheless, he decides to go back to Belgrade to stand trial as a political gesture. But he has been recognised by Mabel Warren, a lesbian journalist living in Cologne, who is travelling with her partner, Janet Pardoe. Warren now believes that she is onto a major news story. When the train arrives at Vienna, she leaves the carriage to phone her office but is stranded in the city when her bag is stolen. The thief is Grünlich, who has just killed a man during a failed robbery and now boards the train with Warren's money. Left behind, the angry Warren vows to get Czinner's story through other means.

At Subotica the train is stopped on the Yugoslav border and Czinner is arrested. Also arrested are Grünlich, for having a revolver, and Coral, to whom Czinner has given a letter to deliver for him. A court martial is held at which Czinner is allowed to give the pointless political speech he intended for his show trial. He is sentenced to be shot that evening, while Grünlich is to be imprisoned for a month and then deported back to Vienna, where the police will be looking for him. Coral is to be deported back to England the next day.

The three prisoners are kept in a waiting room, but when they realise that Myatt has returned in a car, the resourceful Grünlich breaks open the door and all three make a run for it. Only Grünlich escapes; Czinner is wounded and Coral hides him in a barn, where he dies. Next morning, Mabel Warren arrives at Subotica in pursuit of her news story and takes Coral back to Cologne. Mabel fancies Coral as a new partner but the account breaks off as Coral collapses in the back of the car with a heart condition and her ultimate fate is left open.

After the train arrives at Istanbul, Myatt discovers that Janet Pardoe is the niece of Stein, a rival businessman and potential business partner. He steals her from the proprietorship of the Cockney novelist Savory, who is travelling to the East in search of copy for his next book. Despite his own brief encounter with Coral, Myatt now considers marrying Janet and confirming the contract, signed by Eckman, to take over Stein's currant business.

== Themes ==
The novel in part reflects the author's financial circumstances at the time he wrote it, and partly the gloom of the Depression era in England. In 1971, Greene judged that "The pages are too laden by the anxieties of the time and the sense of failure. […] By the time I finished Stamboul Train the day of security had almost run out. Even my dreams were full of disquiet."

The epigraph given the book is from George Santayana, "Everything is lyrical in its ideal essence; tragic in its fate and comic in its existence", which indicates its ambivalence of mood. A major theme there is also the issue of fidelity, the duty to others vis-à-vis duty to self, and whether or not faithfulness to others pays; this theme is most clearly shown in the mental struggles of Czinner and Coral.

The portrayal of antisemitism, shown by several characters and particularly impacting on Myatt, was later to become a subject of controversy. The question has been raised how far Greene shared these views himself and was demonstrating them in his portrayal of Myatt. This was Michael Shelden's view in his "prosecutional and problematic" Graham Greene: The Man Within (1994). For David Pearce, however, "Anti-Semitism is not Greene. It is society in 1932." He also quotes Maria Aurora Couto, who interviewed Greene in 1980. "Myatt is the underdog and the outsider, and a character treated with great sympathy. I interpret these [early] novels as an attack upon capitalism rather than against the Jewish race, or religion."

== Adaptations ==
Two films were adapted from Greene's novel: The 1934 Orient Express and the BBC TV adaptation 1962 Stamboul Train. The author was dismissive of both. "This film manufactured from my book came last and was far and away the worst [of several others on the same theme], although not so bad as a later television production by the BBC."

Two versions were also written for radio. Shelden Stark's Orient Express was broadcast in the CBS Escape series on 19 February 1949. This was only a half-hour drama very approximately based on the novel. Its American businessman narrator is Myatt, while Czinner, whom he rescues from death, is a naturalised US citizen. Jeremy Front's ninety-minute Stamboul Train was broadcast by BBC Radio 4 on 18 November 2017.

== Bibliography ==
- Greene, Graham: Ways of Escape, 1980, Vintage reprint 1999
- Mellor, Leo: Early Graham Greene, Oxford Handbooks Online, 2014
