= May We Borrow Your Husband? =

May We Borrow Your Husband? may refer to:

- May We Borrow Your Husband? (short story collection), a 1967 collection of short stories by Graham Greene
- May We Borrow Your Husband? (film), a 1986 British television movie
