= Ray Ring =

Ray Ring may refer to:

- Ray Ring (writer)
- Ray Ring (politician)
