= Twenty-One Stories =

1954 short story collection by Graham Greene

- First edition cover
- Author: Graham Greene
- Language: English
- Genre: Short story collection
- Publisher: Heinemann
- Publication date: 1954

Twenty-One Stories (1954) is a collection of short stories by Graham Greene. All but the last four stories appeared in his earlier 1947 collection Nineteen Stories (two stories, "The Other Side Of The Border" and "The Lottery Ticket" were not included in the later collection).

== Stories ==
The collection usually presents the stories in reverse chronological order

1. "The End of the Party" (1929)
2. "The Second Death" (1929)
3. "Proof Positive" (1930)
4. "I Spy" (1930)
5. "A Day Saved" (1935)
6. "Jubilee" (1936)
7. "Brother" (1936)
8. "A Chance for Mr Lever" (1936)
9. "The Basement Room" (1936) (adapted by the author as The Fallen Idol, a film directed by Carol Reed)
10. "The Innocent" (1937)
11. "A Drive in the Country" (1937)
12. "Across the Bridge" (1938) (made into a 1957 film starring Rod Steiger)
13. "A Little Place off the Edgware Road" (1939)
14. "The Case for the Defence" (1939)
15. "Alas, Poor Maling" (1940)
16. "Men at Work" (1940)
17. "Greek Meets Greek" (1941)
18. "The Hint of an Explanation" (1948)
19. "The Blue Film" (1954)
20. "Special Duties" (1954)
21. "The Destructors" (1954)
