= The Lost Childhood =

The Lost Childhood is the title of several books. It may refer to -

- The Lost Childhood and Other Essays, a collection by Graham Greene, published 1951
- The Lost Childhood (Nir book), by Yehuda Nir, published 2002
