= Here Comes Civilization =

2001 collection of science fiction stories written by William Tenn

- Author: William Tenn, Edited by Mary Tabasko and James A. Mann
- Cover artist: Rolf Mohr
- Language: English
- Series: The Complete Science Fiction of William Tenn
- Genre: Science fiction
- Publisher: NESFA Press
- Publication date: September 2001
- Publication place: United States
- Media type: Print (hardback)
- Pages: 545
- ISBN: 1-886778-28-0
- OCLC: 48590735
- Preceded by: Immodest Proposals

Here Comes Civilization is a collection of 27 science fiction stories written by William Tenn, the second of two volumes presenting Tenn's complete body of science fiction writings. It features an introduction by Robert Silverberg and an afterword by George Zebrowski. Tenn provides afterwords to each story, describing how they came to be written.

== Contents ==
- "Here Comes Civilization", (essay by Robert Silverberg)
- "Bernie the Faust" (novelette, originally published in Playboy in November 1963)
- "Betelgeuse Bridge" (short story, originally published in Galaxy, April 1951)
- "Will You Walk a Little Faster" (short story, originally published in Marvel Science Fiction, November 1951)
- "The House Dutiful" (short story, originally published in Astounding SF, April 1948)
- "There Were People on Bikini, There Were People on Attu" (short story, originally published in The Best of Omni Science Fiction, No.5, 1983)
- "She Only Goes Out at Night..." (short story, originally published in Fantastic Universe, October 1956)
- "Mistress Sary" (short story, originally published in Weird Tales, May 1947)
- "The Malted Milk Monster" (novelette, originally published in Galaxy, August 1959)
- "The Human Angle" (short story, originally published in Famous Fantastic Mysteries, October 1948)
- "Everybody Loves Irving Bommer" (short story, originally published in Fantastic Adventures, August 1951)
- "A Matter of Frequency" (short story, originally published in Science Fiction Quarterly, May 1951)
- "The Ionian Cycle" - (novelette, originally published in Thrilling Wonder Stories, August 1948)
- "Hallock's Madness" - (novelette, originally published in Marvel Science Stories, May 1951)
- "Ricardo's Virus" (short story, originally published in Planet Stories, March 1953)
- "The Puzzle of Priipiirii" (short story, originally published in Out of This World Adventures, July 1950)
- "Dud" (short story, originally published in Thrilling Wonder Stories, April 1948)
- "Confusion Cargo" (short story, originally published in Planet Stories, Spring 1948)
- "The Discovery of Morniel Mathaway" (short story, originally published in |Galaxy, October 1955)
- "Sanctuary" (short story, originally published in Galaxy, December 1957)
- "Me, Myself, and I" (short story, originally published in Planet Stories, Winter 1947)
- "It Ends with a Flicker" (short story, originally published in Galaxy, December 1956, published as "Of All Possible Worlds")
- "The Girl with Some Kind of Past. And George." (short story, originally published in Asimov's Science Fiction, October 1993)
- "Flirgleflip" (novelette, originally published as "The Remarkable Flirgleflip" in Fantastic Adventures, May 1950)
- "Errand Boy"(short story, originally published in Astounding SF, June 1947)
- "A Lamp for Medusa" (novella, originally published in Fantastic Adventures, October 1951)
- "On the Fiction in Science Fiction" - (essay, originally published in Science Fiction Adventures, March 1954)
- Of Men and Monsters (novel, originally published by Ballantine Books in June 1968)
- "Afterword: William Tenn: The Swiftest Tortoise", (essay by George Zebrowski)
