= Orient Express (1934 film) =

1934 film by Paul Martin

- Spanish poster
- Directed by: Paul Martin
- Written by: William M. Conselman; Carl Hovey
- Based on: Stamboul Train by Graham Greene
- Produced by: Sol M. Wurtzel
- Starring: Heather Angel; Norman Foster; Ralph Morgan
- Cinematography: George Schneiderman
- Music by: Hugo Friedhofer; Samuel Kaylin; Arthur Lange
- Production company: Fox Film Corporation
- Distributed by: Fox Film Corporation
- Release date: February 28, 1934
- Running time: 73 minutes
- Country: United States
- Language: English

Orient Express is a 1934 American pre-Code drama film directed by Paul Martin and starring Heather Angel, Norman Foster and Ralph Morgan. It is based on the 1932 novel Stamboul Train by Graham Greene, the first of his works to be adapted for the screen. It was produced and distributed by Fox Film. Fox were persuaded to hire Martin as director by Lilian Harvey, the actress who was in a relationship with him, and had signed with the studio after starring in several films directed by Martin in Germany. It was his only Hollywood film and he returned to Germany where he again directed Harvey in several more hits. The film is part of a group set almost entirely on trains or ocean liners during the decade.

== Plot ==
A group of passengers travel from Ostend to Istanbul on the Orient Express.

== Cast ==
- Heather Angel as Coral Musker
- Norman Foster as Carlton Myatt
- Ralph Morgan as Dr. Richard Czinner
- Herbert Mundin as Herbert Thomas Peters
- Una O'Connor as Mrs. Peters
- Irene Ware as Janet Pardoe
- Dorothy Burgess as Mabel Warren
- Lisa Gora as Anna
- Roy D'Arcy as Josef Grunlich
- Perry Ivins as Major Petrovich
- Frederick Vogeding as Colonel Hartep
- Marc Loebell as Lieutenant Alexitch

== Critical reception ==
Reviews were generally negative with the New York Herald Tribune noting "the story is a tangle of loose ends and rough edges which grows increasingly obscure as the tale unwinds" while the New York Times critic felt "the earlier sequences are pieced together in a crude way, and the latter ones are unbelievable". This was in line with a wider poor reception of releases by Fox before the merger with Darryl F. Zanuck's Twentieth Century Pictures revived the company's production quality.

== Bibliography ==
- Ascheid, Antje. Hitler's Heroines: Stardom & Womanhood In Nazi Cinema. Temple University Press, 2010.
- Dooley, Roger B. From Scarface to Scarlett: American Films in the 1930s. Harcourt Brace Jovanovich, 1981.
- Solomon, Aubrey. The Fox Film Corporation, 1915-1935: A History and Filmography. McFarland, 2011.
