= Madeleine Henrey =

French writer

- Born: Madeleine Mathilde Gal; August 13, 1906; Clichy, Île-de-France, France
- Died: 25 April 2004 (aged 97); Villers-sur-Mer, Normandy, France
- Occupation: Author
- Spouse: Robert Selby Henrey
- Children: 1
- Writing career
- Pen name: Mrs Robert Henrey
- Language: English, French
- Genre: Autobiography
- Notable works: A Farm in Normandy, The Little Madeleine

Madeleine Mathilde Henrey (1906–2004, née Gal, pseud. Mrs Robert Henrey) was a French-born writer. She wrote over 30 books, mainly of an autobiographical nature, that enjoyed considerable fame in post-war Britain.

== Life ==
Madeleine Mathilde Gal, the daughter of a miner and seamstress, moved as a child to Soho, London, following her father's death. She met her future husband, Robert Selby Henrey, at the Savoy Hotel; they were married in 1928 and their romance would prove to be a lifelong attachment lasting until his death in 1982.

Her son, Bobby Henrey, was a child actor, notably in the film The Fallen Idol, the making of which was described in her book A film star in Belgrave Square. Her writing career stretched from 1941 to 1979 and during this time she brought many of the events of her childhood and career to public attention. She enjoyed a long relationship with publishers, J. M. Dent & Sons, and most of her works, particularly her early ones, were a commercial success.

== Works ==
Publisher is London: J. M. Dent & Sons, unless stated.

=== Fiction ===
- Delphine (1947), writing as Robert Henrey, London: Peter Davies

A series of stories

- An Attic in Jermyn Street (1948), writing as Robert Henrey

The story of a girl reporter

- Philippa (1949), writing as Mrs Robert Henrey

=== Non-fiction ===
- A Farm in Normandy (1941), writing as Mrs Robert Henrey

The birth of her child

- A Village in Picadilly (1942), writing as Mrs Robert Henrey

The author's experiences during the air raids on London

- Letters from Paris, 1870-1875 ([1942]) by C. de B., trans. and ed. by M.H. writing as Mrs Robert Henrey

C. de B. was a political informant to the head of the London house of Rothschild

- A Journey to Gibraltar (1943), writing as Mrs Robert Henrey

The author's experiences during the London Blitz

- The Incredible City (1944), writing as Mrs Robert Henrey

Part of her London trilogy

- Bloomsbury Fair (1944), writing as Mrs Robert Henrey

Three London families

- The Foolish Decade (1945), writing as Mrs Robert Henrey

London social life and customs

- The Siege of London (1946), writing as Mrs Robert Henrey

Part of her London trilogy, an account of life in London from February 1944 to May 1945

- The King of Brentford (1946), writing as Mrs Robert Henrey, London : Peter Davies

On the life of Thomas Selby Henrey

- The Return to the Farm (1947), writing as Mrs Robert Henrey, London: Peter Davies

Life on their Normandy farm during the Second World War

- A Film Star in Belgrave Square (1948), writing as Mrs Robert Henrey, London: Peter Davies

The making of the film The Fallen Idol, starring her son, Bobby.

- London (1948), writing as Mrs Robert Henrey

with watercolours by Phyllis Ginger

- A Journey to Vienna (1950), writing as Mrs Robert Henrey

Her small son becomes briefly a film star

- Mathilda and the Chickens (1950), writing as Mrs Robert Henrey

The farm in Normandy just after the war

- Paloma (1951), writing as Mrs Robert Henrey

The story of a friend, a story of friendship

- The Little Madeleine (1951), writing as Mrs Robert Henrey

Her girlhood

- An Exile in Soho (1952), writing as Mrs Robert Henrey

Her adolescence

- Madeleine Grown Up (1953), writing as Mrs Robert Henrey

Her love story and marriage

- Madeleine Young Wife (1954), writing as Mrs Robert Henrey

War and peace on her farm in Normandy

- A Month in Paris (1954), writing as Mrs Robert Henrey

She revisits the city of her birth

- Milou's Daughter (1955), writing as Mrs Robert Henrey

She goes in search of her father's Midi

- Madeleine's Journal, writing as Mrs Robert Henrey

London during coronation year, her contemporary journal

- This Feminine World (1956), writing as Mrs Robert Henrey

Paris dressmakers

- A Daughter for a Fortnight (1957), writing as Mrs Robert Henrey
- The Virgin of Aldermanbury (1958), writing as Mrs Robert Henrey

Rebuilding of the City

- Mistress of Myself (1959), writing as Mrs Robert Henrey

A golden summer by the sea, a summer on her farm

- The Dream Makers (1961), writing as Mrs Robert Henrey

The world of women's magazines

- Spring in a Soho Street (1962), writing as Mrs Robert Henrey
- Her April Days (1963), writing as Mrs Robert Henrey

The death of her mother

- Wednesday at Four (1964), writing as Mrs Robert Henrey

An afternoon in London and a journey to Moscow, one year in her life

- Winter Wild (1966), writing as Mrs Robert Henrey

Clouds on the horizon

- She Who Pays (1969), writing as Mrs Robert Henrey

Background to a near 'revolution'

- A Girl At Twenty (1974), writing as Mrs Robert Henrey

Six months in the life of young Madeline, she works in Coventry Street.

== See also ==
=== Bibliography ===
- Roger Greaves, Reading Madeleine : Mrs Robert Henrey, authoress, Entrevaux, les Editions d'En Face, 2024, 270 p., (ISBN 978-2-84656-026-9)

=== External links ===
- Reading Madeleine : A digital companion (https://readingmadeleine.com)
