= Double Take (2001 film) =

2001 film by George Gallo

- Theatrical release poster
- Directed by: George Gallo
- Written by: George Gallo
- Based on: Across the Bridge by; Guy Elmes; Dennis Freeman; "Across the Bridge" by Graham Greene
- Produced by: David Permut; Brett Ratner
- Starring: Eddie Griffin; Orlando Jones; Edward Herrmann
- Cinematography: Theo van de Sande
- Edited by: Malcolm Campbell
- Music by: Graeme Revell
- Production companies: Touchstone Pictures; Permut Presentations; Rat Entertainment
- Distributed by: Buena Vista Pictures Distribution
- Release date: January 12, 2001
- Running time: 88 minutes
- Country: United States
- Language: English
- Budget: $24 million
- Box office: $31.6 million

Double Take is a 2001 American buddy action comedy film written and directed by George Gallo and starring Eddie Griffin and Orlando Jones. It is a remake of the 1957 British drama film Across the Bridge, which was in turn based on the short story by Graham Greene. The supporting cast includes Edward Herrmann, Gary Grubbs, Garcelle Beauvais, and Daniel Roebuck.

== Plot ==
Daryl Chase is a successful investment banker who handles international accounts for a major New York City firm. On his way to work he notices a man named Freddy Tiffany in a brawl against a thief with a knife. Freddy, able to defend himself, almost gets falsely arrested for theft. But Daryl and his doorman run over to clear Freddy from the police. Daryl gives Freddy $105 for injuries. Moments later Daryl notices Freddy and the man he fought with talking and laughing and realizes the fight was all for pretend as he rushes over but the two run off in a hurry. Chase discovers to his office's surprise, that Don Carlos Cola, a soda company transferred an sum of $106 million, to its owner's account. Daryl and his boss Charles "C.A." Allsworth, discover the money from Daryl's assistant Shari.

Later at Daryl's girlfriend Chloe's fashion show, Daryl finds out and informs C.A. that the soda company does not exist and does not want to be arrested and charged for laundering money. Then, Thomas "Minty" Chela, Daryl's client who made the deposit, shows up to the show with his girlfriend Maque Sanchez to give gratitude to Daryl for catching his deposit. Later Freddy shows up and dances on stage with Chloe, much to Daryl's irritation.

After the show ends, Daryl and Chloe are attacked by a man who is then shot dead by CIA agents, Timothy Jarrett "T.J." McReady and Martinez. McReady explains that the man he was attacked by was an assassin from a drug cartel, who under the guise of the soda company, Don Carlos, made the $106 million deposit to Daryl's bank. He then shows Daryl and Chloe pictures of Freddy, two drug dealers, and the assassin. McReady tells the two that he has to return to Mexico for an investigation and Martinez has to stay to protect them.

The next day Daryl notices the drug dealers at his office and quickly loses them after a chase. Daryl later goes over to Shari's house and notices her dead with another assassin who shoots at him and two officers who appeared at the front door, leaving the three dead and neighbors noticing Daryl with a gun. Daryl calls McReady and informs him of what happened and McReady tells him to get on a train to Mexico and avoid talking to anybody. At Penn Station, Freddy notices Daryl there and he persuades Freddy to switch clothes and identities, so Freddy poses as a businessman and Daryl poses as Freddy.

On the train, Daryl informs Freddy of the situation. Freddy thinks they are being followed and watched by another man on the train. They both knock the man unconscious noticing he has a picture of Daryl and a gun in his pocket and Freddy takes him off the train. Freddy reads a newspaper and notices a column about Daryl being a suspect in the murder of the cops from earlier. He tells Daryl that there is a $100,000 reward for his whereabouts. Daryl becomes suspicious of Freddy, thinking that he might turn him over to the police.

Freddy then reveals that he believes Daryl is innocent and that he is an FBI agent and his 'street' act was a front and that he is protecting Daryl on the way to Mexico and will then to take out the real criminals. Daryl then knocks Freddy out and then throws him off the train. Daryl is then kicked off for having Delores, Freddy's dog on the train.

Daryl poses as Freddy at the border between Texas and Mexico, then notices a wanted photo of Freddy for the murder of Governor Eduardo Quintana. Daryl panics and rushes the border, getting shot at. Daryl ditches his car, only to be intercepted by Freddy. They both drive to a gas station. When Freddy gets distracted by music, Daryl steals the car and leaves Freddy and Delores.

Daryl goes to an emu ranch motel. Then the owner, Junior, notices Freddy's card on Daryl and his wanted photo, assuming Daryl is Freddy, ready to turn him in. Daryl calls McReady, who is undercover. McReady informs Daryl that Freddy was kicked out of the Bureau a couple of years ago because he was mental. Daryl then calls Chloe with Agents Norville and Gradney who only pretended to be drug dealers but were still after Daryl for the murders. Freddy arrives at the motel to show him that he had placed a transmitter on Daryl when they swapped clothes so he would not lose him if he ran.

At a bar, Freddy informs Daryl that McReady and Martinez are corrupt agents, the Don Carlos soda company is actually a drug front and "Thomas Chela", who made the deposit is really Minty Gutierrez who runs the drug cartel. He is suspected of being involved in Quintana's murder because he was caught on camera at the side of his house.

Daryl and Freddy go back to the motel and Freddy notices soda, water, and cookie brand trucks approaching to kill Freddy. Freddy realizes those are McReady's men out there to kill him and tries to use a pen to get a strike team over to him fast but can't find the right one. A shootout occurs between the CIA masquerading as Fiji Water truckers and the Texas State Troopers with Daryl being grabbed and forced at gunpoint by the motel's owner, taken to the Mexican-U.S. border with the Mexican guards escorting Junior and Daryl to a police station and Freddy escaping from the shootout. At the station, the capatain is ecstatic that he will be rewarded for apprehending Freddy but Daryl informs the captain he's not really Freddy Tiffany and the motel owner had made a mistake. The captain believes him until Maque shows pretending to be the spouse of 'Freddy'. Daryl tries to explain that he has only met her once at the fashion show. But instead, the police lock Daryl in a cell.

McReady shows up to get Daryl out of jail. As McReady signs Daryl out, Daryl notices Martinez and the assassin who attacked him before, still alive. He also notices a photo of Delores next to Quintana, McReady with a dog's bite mark on his leg, revealing that McReady was Quintana's murderer and that Freddy was right the whole time. Daryl runs from the station and into Freddy, Norville and Gradney. Freddy informs Daryl of their real identities. Gradney, who is also a corrupt agent, shoots Norville dead and drives away with Delores in the car as Freddy shoots at him. Arriving at Quintana's mansion with Minty, McReady, Martinez, C.A. and Maque there, Gradney blows Maque's cover as she is an FBI agent as well as Freddy's wife and partner and that the dog's bite connects them to the murders. Daryl and Freddy arrive at the mansion with both having swapped back to their clothes Daryl, Freddy and Maque get the upper hand in the room. McReady informs them that Quintana didn't want to join them and attempted to stop them.

Minty then tells C.A. that he has over $600 million in the American banks which the government had frozen and the only chance of him recovering his money is to turn him, McReady, Martinez and Gradney over to the Justice Department which Freddy and Maque are members of. C.A. realizes that was the whole reason Minty made the deposit, leading to a confession. The assassin shows up with Chloe hostage, leading Freddy to shoot him. As a shootout occurs, McReady shoots and kills Minty, while Freddy kills Gradney and Martinez. McReady shoots Freddy in the arm as Daryl shoots at him but misses every shot. McReady prepares to kill them, but Delores bites him in the leg leading him to accidentally shoot his foot, causing him to fall down the stairs and shoot himself numerous times, with one to his head, killing him.

The next morning, C.A. is arrested, and Shari reveals to be alive and an FBI agent who had to get Daryl out of New York for his safety. Later Daryl and Freddy are now close friends as well as Chloe and Maque hanging out at a beach. Daryl tries to sign a check, but grabs the wrong pen and moments later, a strike team storms the beach.

== Cast ==
- Eddie Griffin as FBI Agent Freddy Tiffany
- Orlando Jones as New York investment firm broker Daryl Chase
- Gary Grubbs as CIA chief Timothy Jarrett McReady
- Edward Herrmann as New York investment firm manager Charles Allsworth
- Garcelle Beauvais as Daryl's wife Chloe
- Andrea Navedo as FBI Agent Maque Sanchez/Freddy's (Frederico)/Daryl's/Minty's posing wife
- Shawn Elliott as Thomas Chela/Minty Gutierrez
- Sterling Macer Jr. as FBI Agent Agent Gradney
- Benny Nieves as FBI Agent Martinez
- Daniel Roebuck as Agent Norville
- Vivica A. Fox as FBI Agent Shari and Daryl's posing secretary
- Pamela Kosh as Nun
- Willow the dog as Freddy's dog Delores

== Box office ==
The film opened at #4 at the North American box office making $11.7 million USD in its opening weekend behind Traffic, Cast Away and Save the Last Dance, which debuted at the top spot.

== Reception ==
The film received mostly negative reviews. According to review aggregator Rotten Tomatoes, 12% of 78 reviews are positive with an average score of 5.4/10, with the site's consensus: "Despite a good performance by Orlando Jones, the movie is ruined by a ridiculous, messy plot and fails to generate laughs". Dwayne E. Leslie of Boxoffice Magazine writes; "(it) suffers from a scattershot approach to rapid-fire jokes that usually miss their mark, though Griffin's comedic talents brighten the proceedings and Jones does his part to add his own flavor to the mix." Christy Lemire of Associated Press writes; "Double Take is so convoluted, so unnecessarily mind-boggling, it should be called Quintuple Take." John R. McEwen of Film Quips Online writes; "I think Double Take would have worked much better as a simple buddy comedy, without trying to have the plot of a serious thriller." Metacritic, which uses a weighted average, assigned the film a score of 25 out of 100, based on 22 critics, indicating "generally unfavorable" reviews.

== Music ==
A dance competition in the film features the song "Return of the Tres" by hip-hop group Delinquent Habits. A remix of the Joe song "Stutter" featuring Mystikal was featured in this film. This version of the song was marketed as "The Double Take Remix", due to its appearance in this film.
