= William Tenn =

Science fiction author

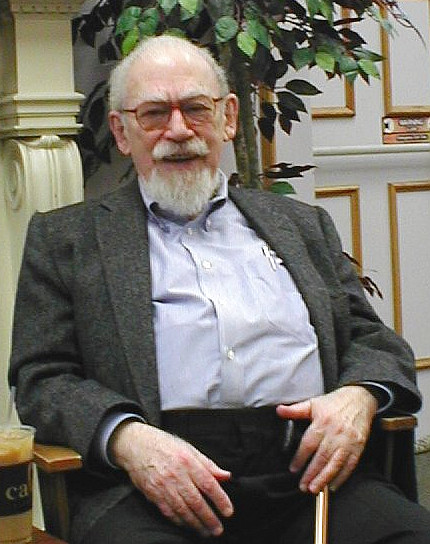
- Tenn in 2002
- Born: Philip Klass; May 9, 1920; London, England
- Died: February 7, 2010 (aged 89); Mt. Lebanon, Pennsylvania, United States
- Resting place: Queen of Heaven Catholic Cemetery
- Spouse: Fruma Klass
- Writing career
- Language: English
- Period: 1946–2004
- Genre: Science fiction
- Notable awards: Author Emeritus
- Website: dpsinfo.com/williamtenn

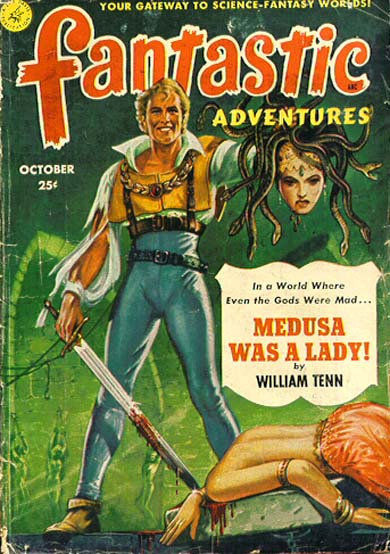
Tenn's short novel "Medusa Was a Lady" was the cover story in the October 1951 issue of Fantastic Adventures, but would not appear in book form (as A Lamp for Medusa) until 1968

William Tenn was the pseudonym of Philip Klass (May 9, 1920 – February 7, 2010), a British-born American science fiction author, notable for many stories with satirical elements.

== Biography ==
Born to a Jewish family in London, Phillip Klass moved to New York City with his parents before his second birthday and grew up in Brooklyn, the oldest of three children. After serving in the United States Army during World War II as a combat engineer in Europe, he held a job as a technical editor with an Air Force radar and radio laboratory and was employed by Bell Labs.

Phillip and Fruma Klass married in 1957, and they moved in 1966 to State College, Pennsylvania, where he taught English and comparative literature at Penn State University for 22 years. His students who would go on to professional careers as writers included Rambo creator David Morrell, screenwriter Steven E. de Souza, technology writer Steven Levy and crime novelist Ray Ring.

Phil's wife, Fruma Klass (1935–2026), grew up in New York City and graduated from the Bronx High School of Science and Brooklyn College to work as a lab technician, a medical editor and a Harper & Row copy editor. At Penn State, she was a writing instructor and a copy editor for the Penn State University Press.

When Phil Klass retired, the couple moved to the Pittsburgh suburb of Mt. Lebanon in 1988, and Fruma took a job as an editor with Black Box Corporation. That same year, her first short story, "Before the Rainbow", was published in the anthology Synergy 3. In 1996, her second story, "After the Rainbow", won a Writers of the Future prize; the story was published in Writers of the Future, Vol. XII. In 2004, she entered a worldwide essay competition, the Power of Purpose Awards, sponsored by the John Templeton Foundation. Competing against 7,000 entrants from 97 countries, she won $25,000 for her essay "Streets of Mud, Streets of Gold".

Phil and Fruma Klass were members of the Pittsburgh Area Real Time Science Fiction Enthusiasts Consortium (PARSEC) and were frequent speakers at its local conference, Confluence.

Phil Klass was a Guest of Honor at Noreascon 4, the 2004 World Science Fiction Convention. He was the Author Guest of Honor at Loscon 33 at the LAX Marriott in Los Angeles in 2006.

He has published most of his fiction as William Tenn and much of his nonfiction as Phil (or Philip) Klass. He is sometimes confused with UFO debunker Philip J. Klass, who was born six months earlier and who died August 9, 2005.

Klass was related to other writers, including his nieces Perri Klass and Judy Klass, his nephew David Klass, and his brother Morton Klass.

He died on February 7, 2010, of congestive heart failure, and was survived by his wife Fruma, daughter Adina, and sister Frances Goldman-Levy.

== Writing ==
Klass published academic articles, essays, two novels and more than 60 short stories. He began writing while working at Bell Labs, and his radar lab experience prompted his first story, "Alexander the Bait", about a radar beam aimed at the Moon. It was published in Astounding Science Fiction (May 1946), and within months a Signal Corps lab bounced a radar beam off the Moon, making his story obsolete. He commented: "It was a bad story, just good enough to be published. Others in the same magazine were much better, so I really worked hard on my second one. I did as well as I knew how."

Some of the nonfiction articles in the trade periodical TWX Magazine have been attributed to Klass during his employment at Bell Labs, although most were published without by-lines.

His second story, the widely reprinted "Child's Play" (1947), told of a lawyer who creates people with his Bild-A-Man kit, a Christmas gift intended for a child of the future. After publication in Astounding Science Fiction (May 1946), Tenn was soon hailed as the science fiction field's reigning humorist, and during the early 1950s, readers of Galaxy Science Fiction looked forward to issues featuring his satirical science fiction.

Many stories followed, including "Venus and the Seven Sexes" (1951), "Down Among the Dead Men" (1954), "The Liberation of Earth", "Time in Advance" (1956) and "On Venus, Have We Got a Rabbi" (1974). One of his non-fiction articles, "Mr. Eavesdropper", was later collected in Best Magazine Articles, 1968. His essay and interview collection Dancing Naked was nominated for a Hugo Award for Best Related Book in 2004. He was given the Author Emeritus honor by the Science Fiction and Fantasy Writers of America in 1999.

The Encyclopedia of Science Fiction ranked Tenn as "one of the genre's very few genuinely comic, genuinely incisive writers of short fiction". Theodore Sturgeon summed up Tenn's humorous viewpoint on life:

It would be too wide a generalization to say that every SF satire, every SF comedy and every attempt at witty and biting criticism found in the field is a poor and usually cheap imitation of what this man has been doing since the 1940s. His incredibly involved and complex mind can at times produce constructive comment so pointed and astute that the fortunate recipient is permanently improved by it. Admittedly, the price may be to create two whole categories for our species: humanity and William Tenn. For each of which you must create your ethos and your laws. I've done that. And to me it's worth it.

Tenn wrote two novels, both published in 1968. Of Men and Monsters is an expansion of his story "The Men in the Walls", originally in Galaxy Science Fiction (October 1963). A Lamp for Medusa was published as a double novel with Dave Van Arnam's The Players of Hell. This novella was an expansion of his story "Medusa Was a Lady!" from the October 1951 issue of Fantastic Adventures.

== Theater ==
In 1978, the University Readers at Penn State University presented a dramatization, directed by Joseph Wigley, of four of Tenn's short stories under the title Four From Tenn. The selected stories were "The Discovery of Morniel Mathaway", "Bernie the Faust", "The Tenants", and "My Mother Was a Witch".

Pittsburgh's Malacandra Productions staged a nine-character play adapted by John Regis from the classic Tenn science fiction short story "Winthrop Was Stubborn". Directed by David Brody for the Three Rivers Arts Festival, this production ran from June 2 through June 17, 2006.

== Works ==
- The Evolution of William Tenn or Myself When Young (1939; these stories were first published in book form by the Pretentious Press in 1995)
- Null-P (1951)
- The Jester (1951) humorous science fiction short story
  A standup comedian purchases a robot to help write his jokes, but eventually the robot becomes a star displacing his owner.
- Children of Wonder (anthology edited by William Tenn) (1953)
- Of All Possible Worlds (1955)
- The Human Angle (1956)
- Time in Advance (1958)
- A Lamp for Medusa (novella published as a double with The Players of Hell by Dave Van Arnam) (1968)
- Of Men and Monsters (novel) (1968)
- Once Against the Law (anthology of crime fiction edited by Tenn and Donald E. Westlake) (1968)
- The Seven Sexes (1968)
- The Square Root of Man (1968)
- The Wooden Star (1968)
- On Venus, Have We Got a Rabbi! (1974); published in several collections
- Immodest Proposals: The Complete Science Fiction of William Tenn, Volume I (omnibus) (2000)
- Here Comes Civilization: The Complete Science Fiction of William Tenn, Volume II (omnibus) (2001)
- Dancing Naked, the Unexpurgated William Tenn (non-fiction omnibus) (2004) [Hugo Nominee, Best Related Book, 2005]

=== Online ===
- William Tenn: "Constantinople" (full text).
- William Tenn: "Poul Anderson" (full text).
- William Tenn: "Remembrance of Worldcons Past" (full text)
- William Tenn: "Welles or Wells: The First Invasion from Mars" (full text).
- "Streets of Mud, Streets of Gold," $25,000 award-winning essay by Fruma Klass (full text)
- William Tenn: "On Venus, Have We Got a Rabbi!" (full text)

== Sources ==
- Clute, John and Peter Nicholls. The Encyclopedia of Science Fiction. New York: St. Martin's Griffin, 1993 (2nd edition 1995). ISBN 0-312-13486-X.
- Stephensen-Payne, Phil and Gordon Benson Jr. William Tenn, High Klass Talent: A Working Bibliography. Galactic Central Publications, 1993. ISBN 1-871133-39-4.
