= Phyllis Ginger =

English painter (1907–2005)

- Born: 19 October 1907; New Malden, Surrey, England
- Died: 3 April 2005 (aged 97); Kew, London, England
- Education: Kingston School of Art; Richmond School of Art; Central School of Art and Design
- Known for: Painting, drawing
- Website: phyllisginger.co.uk

Phyllis Ethel Ginger (19 October 1907 – 3 May 2005) was a British artist and illustrator who, although she had a long career in several different media, is now best known for the topographical watercolours she produced during the Second World War for the Recording Britain project.

Ginger was also a book illustrator and designer of graphic advertisements and book covers.

== Biography ==
Ginger was born in New Malden, Surrey, and attended the Tiffin Girls' School in Kingston upon Thames, where she showed some aptitude for art and attended evening classes at Kingston School of Art. Although her father, who worked for the Post Office, was an amateur artist her parents persuaded Ginger of the need for a more conventional career and she spent some years working as a junior civil servant. In 1932, Ginger enrolled at the Richmond School of Art and then began taking evening classes at the Central School of Art and Design. Aged 30, she won a scholarship which allowed her to attend the Central School on a full-time basis until 1939.

In 1938 she exhibited at the Royal Academy for the first time and in 1939 joined the Senefelder Club and also the Allied International Artists group, with which she showed twice. Her work began to attract international attention.

In 1939 she was commissioned to paint a picture of a London bridge as a gift for the retiring American ambassador to London and the Library of Congress purchased her lithograph, Snow Day at St Bartholomew's Hospital.

During World War Two, Ginger worked for the Recording Britain project which aimed to produce a visual record of buildings and landscapes considered "at risk", either from wartime bombing or urbanization and development. Several of the watercolours Ginger produced, such as her depictions of the Council House, Bristol and of Catherine Place in Bath include elements of bomb damage. American servicemen feature in her pictures of Cheltenham while a barrage balloon is visible in one of the three paintings she made of Regent's Park during the conflict. During the Blitz, Ginger painted the scene at the Goldsmiths' Hall in London after it had been damaged by bombing and both the War Artists' Advisory Committee and the Worshipful Company of Goldsmiths acquired versions of the painting.

In 1946, Ginger returned to London, having moved to Keynsham near Bristol and then Marlow during the War and resumed her commercial career. In 1947 she illustrated Joan Lamburn's book The Mushroom Pony which was published by Noel Carrington, the founder of Puffin Books. In 1943, Ginger wrote and illustrated a children's book Alexander, the Circus Pony, also for Puffin. She produced illustrations, beginning in 1941 with A Farm in Normandy, for several books by the author Madeleine Henrey. In 1947, Ginger produced a colour lithograph, Town Centre, for the School Prints series. In 1952 she was elected to Royal Society of Painters in Watercolours, she exhibited with them for the rest of her life and was the featured artist in their 1990 Spring Exhibition. In the 1970s she exhibited a number of etchings at both the Royal Academy and with the Royal Society of Painter-Ethchers and Engravers. Later in life she focused more on portraiture work.

== Personal life ==
Ginger married the silversmith Leslie Durbin in 1940. The couple had met when they were both students at the Central School and had two children, a son and a daughter, together. For many years the family lived in Kew in London. Durbin died a few months before Ginger in 2005.
