= Shades of Greene =

British TV drama series (1975–1976)

- Starring: John Gielgud; Leo McKern; Virginia McKenna; Paul Scofield; Roy Kinnear
- Country of origin: United Kingdom
- No. of episodes: 18

Production
- Running time: 60 minutes

Original release
- Network: ITV
- Release: 9 September 1975 – 10 February 1976

Shades of Greene is a British television series based on short stories written by the author Graham Greene. The series began in 1975, with each hour-long episode featuring a dramatisation of one of Greene's stories, many of which dealt with issues such as guilt and the Catholic faith, as well as looking at life in general. Actors to have appeared in the series include John Gielgud, Leo McKern, Virginia McKenna, Paul Scofield, Lesley Dunlop, John Hurt and Roy Kinnear.

The series began on 9 September 1975 and ran for two seasons.

== List of episodes ==
=== Season 1 ===
Episode	Title	Dramatised by	Original air date
Episode 1	When Greek Meets Greek	Clive Exton	9 September 1975
Episode 2	Cheap in August	Philip Mackie	16 September 1975
Episode 3	The Invisible Japanese Gentlemen	John Mortimer	23 September 1975
Episode 4	Special Duties	John Mortimer	23 September 1975
Episode 5	Two Gentle People	William Trevor	30 September 1975
Episode 6	The Root of All Evil	Clive Exton	7 October 1975
Episode 7	A Little Place off the Edgware Road	John Mortimer	14 October 1975
Episode 8	The Blue Film	John Mortimer	14 October 1975
Episode 9	The Destructors	John Mortimer	21 October 1975

=== Season 2 ===
Episode	Title	Dramatised by	Original air date
Episode 1	The Case for the Defence	John Mortimer	6 January 1976
Episode 2	Chagrin in Three Parts	John Mortimer	6 January 1976
Episode 3	A Chance for Mr. Lever	Clive Exton	13 January 1976
Episode 4	Alas, Poor Maling	Graham Greene	20 January 1976
Episode 5	Mortmain	John Mortimer	20 January 1976
Episode 6	A Drive in the Country	Philip Mackie	27 January 1976
Episode 7	The Over-night Bag	Clive Exton	2 February 1976
Episode 8	Dream of a Strange Land	Robin Chapman	2 February 1976
Episode 9	Under the Garden	Robin Chapman	10 February 1976

== Overseas sales ==
The series was broadcast by the Nine Network in Australia.

== Book ==
These 18 short stories were re-published in their original form, with cast list and names of dramatiser and director, in the collection Shades of Greene jointly by The Bodley Head and William Heinemann, London, in 1975. ISBN 0 370 10604 0
