= Of All Possible Worlds =

1955 collection of science fiction stories by William Tenn

- First edition
- Author: William Tenn
- Cover artist: Richard M. Powers
- Language: English
- Genre: Science fiction
- Publisher: Ballantine Books
- Publication date: 1955
- Media type: Print (paperback)
- Pages: 160

Of All Possible Worlds is a collection of science fiction stories by American writer William Tenn. It was published in hardcover by Ballantine Books in 1955, with a cover by Richard Powers. Ballantine issued paperback editions in 1955, 1960, and 1968; a British hardcover appeared in 1956 with a paperback following in 1963. It was Tenn's first collection.

== Contents ==
- "On the Fiction in Science Fiction" (essay) (Science Fiction Adventures 1954)
- "Down Among the Dead Men" (Galaxy 1954)
- "Me, Myself, and I" (Planet Stories 1947)
- "The Liberation of Earth" (Future 1953)
- "Everybody Loves Irving Bommer" (Fantastic Adventures 1951)
- "Flirgleflip" (as "The Remarkable Flirgleflip", Fantastic Adventures 1950)
- "The Tenants" (F&SF 1954)
- "The Custodian"" (If 1953)

"Me, Myself, and I" was originally bylined "Kenneth Putnam".

== Reception ==
Anthony Boucher praised the collection, saying it "do[es] not include a dull line" and declaring it "less than firstrate only by Tenn's own high standards", noting then Tenn had "wisely" decided to exclude several of his best stories, which were already easy to find in anthologies. P. Schuyler Miller, reported that Of All Possible Worlds was "superior entertainment" from "one of the few [sf] writers to handle humor deftly."

Aldiss and Wingrove declared Of All Possible Worlds to be Tenn's "best collection," singling out "The Liberation of Earth" as "Tenn's most satisfying and durable satire."
