= Venus and the Seven Sexes =

- Short story by William Tenn
- Country: United States
- Language: English
- Genre: Science fiction short story

Publication
- Published in: The Girl with the Hungry Eyes, and Other Stories
- Publication type: Anthology
- Publisher: Avon Publishing Co., Inc.
- Media type: Print (Paperback)
- Publication date: 1949

"Venus and the Seven Sexes" is a science fiction story by American writer William Tenn. It was first published in the anthology The Girl with the Hungry Eyes, and Other Stories (Avon Publishing) in 1949, and then in 1953 in the anthology Science-Fiction Carnival by Fredric Brown and Mack Reynolds (Shasta Publishers).

The story was reprinted in 1968 in The Seven Sexes, an anthology of William Tenn's short stories published by Ballantine Books. It also appeared in the 2001 anthology of William Tenn's works titled Immodest Proposals, published by NESFA Press.

== Plot ==
On the planet Venus, the native Plookhs are a delicacy eaten by the many ravenous carnivores on the planet, so delicious that even herbivores will take time to eat them. In order to survive, the Plookh reproduce with the participation of seven different sexes, ensuring constant mixing of their genes. The story is narrated by a nzred, one of the sexes, describing his past glories to his children.

Years after first contact, human "bottle-conjugating" film director Hogan Shlestertrap arrives on Venus. A nzred, shafalon, is assigned to meet with him. Considering the posting to be punishment for a failed movie, Shlestertrap intends to make an epic that will make him powerful in Hollywood once again. As the nzred describes the Plookh's complex reproduction, Shlestertrap decides to produce a love story, "Srob meets mlenb, tkan loses guur, flin gets blap".

He sends shafalon off to collect the most beautiful among the race to form the cast. The movie is quickly made with the help of robot servants and a computerized score. In the film, which shafalon notes includes the senses of sound, sight and smell, but not brotch or griggo, the guur leaves the family in a huff before rejoining it just in time to attack and kill a great spotted snake. All ends happily with a new brood.

In order to illustrate to his superiors that he is indeed working as a cultural helper, and not self-serving, Shlestertrap gives shafalon three projectors and tells him to travel the world and show the film to Plookh far and wide. Plookh civilization is nearly destroyed. As the Plookh view the instructions on how to reproduce, prepared for them by the vastly superior humans, the Plookh are slaughtered as they attack the snakes. One snake eats so many families that he can no longer move, leading to a new system in which families attack en masse and smother the snakes with their bodies, leaving remnants that can form at least one family.

Budget cuts lead to Shlestertrap being recalled to Earth, but before he leaves he gives shafalon a new film, constructed entirely of bits of the original, a technique he calls "The Old Switcheroo". In this version, it is the other six sexes that leave and the guur arrives just in time to save them from the snake. The Plookh are mystified at first, but the guur eventually conclude that the first version shows the Plookh living in civilization and the second, barbarity. The other sexes draw their own conclusions, and a schism develops. The narrator concludes the only solution is to give up on the multiple-sexes reproductive system entirely.

== Reception ==
Don D'Ammassa has described it as "quite funny", while Nick Gevers considered it to be a "scathing [analysis] of militarism and cargo-cult culture possessing great bite even now". Io9 called it "off-kilter" and "humorous. Inc. editor George Gendron has compared the Plookh reproductive cycle to the difficulties of running a startup.
