= Bobby Henrey =

Anglo-French child actor

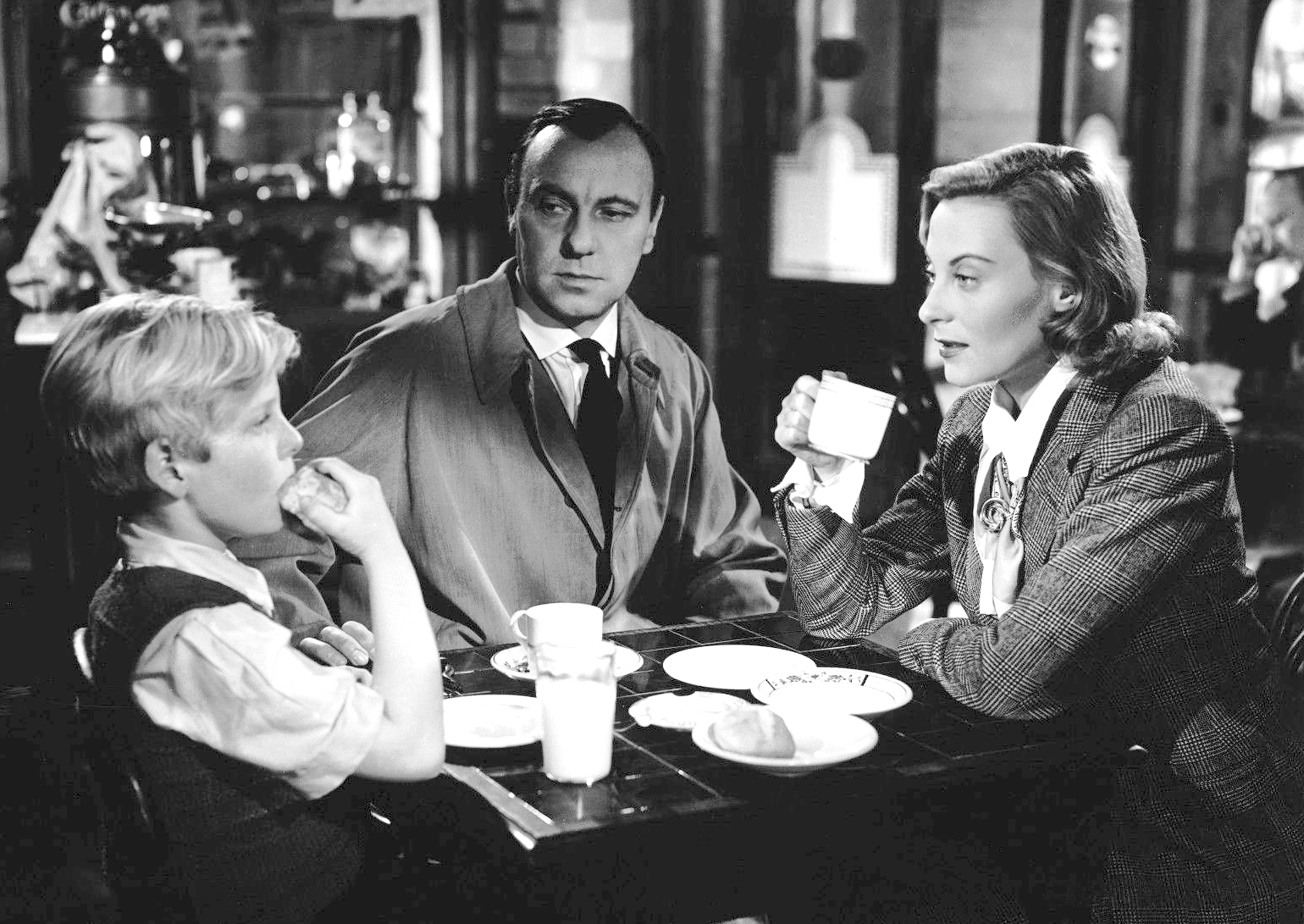
- Bobby Henrey, Ralph Richardson and Michèle Morgan in The Fallen Idol
- Born: 26 June 1939 (age 87); Villers-sur-Mer, Calvados, France
- Occupations: Actor (later an accountant and chaplain)
- Years active: 1948-1951

Robert "Bobby" Henrey (born 26 June 1939) is an Anglo-French former child actor best known for his role as the son of the French ambassador to London in the classic 1948 English film The Fallen Idol, directed by Carol Reed.

== Personal ==
Henrey was the son of Robert Selby Henrey, grandson of Sir Coutts Lindsay, 2nd Baronet and his wife, memoirist Madeleine Gal. Gal would go on to write about her son's film career in two of her many volumes of memoirs, the 1948 A Film Star in Belgrave Square and the 1950 A Journey To Vienna. Henrey went on to study at Downside School and Oxford University, where he obtained a degree in language and literature. At age 25, Henrey moved to the United States, eventually settling in Greenwich, Connecticut. He and his wife Lisette Talbert had a son, Edward, a graphic artist and illustrator, and a daughter, Dominique, who died at age 18 from anaphylactic shock after an allergic reaction while in her first year at Columbia University., having suffered all her life from poor health.

== Careers ==
Henrey's autobiography, Through Grown-up Eyes: Living with Childhood Fame, was published by Polperro Heritage Press in September 2013. Henrey was interviewed on BBC Radio 4's The Film Programme in December 2015 where he discussed the impact that The Fallen Idol had on his childhood and adult life.

=== Acting ===
Henrey was cast in The Fallen Idol based on a photograph of him which appeared on the dustjacket of his mother's book A Village in Piccadilly. Studio head of London Films Alexander Korda passed on the photograph to director Carol Reed, who thought it exactly matched his vision of the character, Philippe, even though the photo had actually been taken in 1942 and showed Henrey when he was three years old. Henrey's parents agreed to let him make the film and a screen test was arranged. But at the time, Henrey, by that time eight years of age, was on holiday at his grandmother's farm in Normandy. So Korda sent a plane over to France to pick him up and fly him to London for the test. Carol Reed liked him at once, especially his liquid French accent, which the part called for. Reed sat down for the first of many talks with Henrey and never saw another child. Henrey was paid £1,000 for his role, with a stipulation that if the film took more than ten weeks to make, he would be paid an extra £100 for every additional week. As the film took eight months to make, a long time for that era, due to Reed's exacting standards, Henrey eventually earned £5,000. When the film was released, the critics were very impressed with Henrey's performance in the film, with one calling him the greatest kid since Jackie Coogan and Henrey became a star overnight. On the strength of his performance in the film, Henrey was signed to a £30,000 contract by Sir Alexander Korda to make four more films for his company between 1948 and 1952, only one of which, The Wonder Kid, was ever made. This was filmed in late 1949 - early 1950, but not released until 1952. However, it was not a great success, influencing his family's belief that he should return to education.

=== Financial career ===
Henrey worked for several years as a tax consulting partner at PriceWaterhouseCoopers in New York City until his retirement in 1997.

=== Ministry ===
Henrey was ordained as a Roman Catholic deacon in 1984 and was an interfaith chaplain at Greenwich Hospital in Connecticut) and a deacon at St. Catherine of Siena Roman Catholic Church in Riverside, Connecticut after his ordination in 2001.
