= Time in Advance =

1958 collection of short stories by William Tenn

- Front cover of the first Bantam Books edition of Time in Advance.
- Author: William Tenn
- Language: English
- Genre: Science fiction
- Publisher: Bantam Books
- Publication date: June 1958
- Publication place: United States
- Media type: Print (hardback & paperback)
- Pages: 153 pp
- OCLC: 314994320

Time in Advance is a collection of four short stories by American science fiction writer William Tenn (a pseudonym of Philip Klass). The stories all originally appeared in a number of different publications between 1952 and 1957. Time in Advance was first published by Bantam Books as a paperback in 1958 and also published as a hardcover in the United Kingdom by Victor Gollancz in 1963, followed a hardcover edition in 1964 published in the United Kingdom by the Science Fiction Book Club and by a Panther paperback edition in April 1966.

== Dedication ==
Tenn (the pseudonym of Philip Klass) dedicated the collection to his wife, Fruma, while referencing the title story of the collection.

=== "Firewater" ===
A reprint of a story first published in February 1952 and featured as that issue's cover story. Here, Earth is visited by enigmatic and uncommunicative aliens who ignore humans and simply observe. Those who do meet with the aliens, gain extraordinary powers, such as telekinesis, but in human terms, also go mad. Algernon Hebster is a highly successful businessman, owing mostly to his dealings with primeys, who supply him with the knowledge for advanced technologies which he puts to use in commerce. The problem is that primeys are so dangerous that dealing with them is highly illegal and every attempt is made to confine them to the reservations around their perceived alien masters.

=== "Time in Advance" ===
This story was published in the August 1956 issue of Galaxy Science Fiction. The story presents a future in which citizens serve out sentences for crimes they have not yet committed. Two "pre-criminals", "Blotto" Otto Henck and Nicholas Crandall, manage against all the odds to serve out two full terms for murder in an off-world penal colony. They are returned to Earth as minor celebrities with the right to kill one person each.

=== "The Sickness" ===
This story first appeared in the November 1955-dated issue of Infinity Science Fiction. In the story, Earth finds itself on the brink of nuclear war between Russia and the United States. As a last-ditch symbolic gesture of peace and cooperation, the two nations launch a joint crewed venture to Mars. After finding an alien city there, a Russian and then American astronaut first come down with a sickness, then gain superhuman power.

Front cover of a Russian edition of "Winthrop Was Stubborn".

=== "Winthrop Was Stubborn" ===
A story first published in Galaxy Science Fiction in August 1957, under the title "Time Waits for Winthrop". The future, via time travel, contacts the present. The present day travelers find themselves stranded in a hedonistic future. The oldest, Winthrop, refuses to return to the past thus leaving all of them trapped. In the present he was a bum, but in the future he's a curio and encouraged to indulge his tastes to the point of gluttony.

== Reception ==
Anthony Boucher received the collection enthusiastically, describing the two novellas included as "models absolute of extrapolative wit and insight" while finding the shorter stories "of almost comparable quality."

== Adaptations ==
The story "Time in Advance" was adapted in 1965 by Paul Erickson as one of twelve episodes of the first series of BBC anthology series Out of the Unknown. The episode survives, and has been released on DVD.
