= The Blue Film =

1954 short story by Graham Greene

"The Blue Film" (1954) is a short story by the English novelist Graham Greene. The story is about the relationship between a married couple, Mr. and Mrs. Carter. It was published in his 1954 collection Twenty-One Stories.

It was adapted for television as part of the 1970s series Shades of Greene, and starred Betsy Blair, Baron Casanov, Koo Stark, and Brian Cox.
