= On Venus, Have We Got a Rabbi! =

1974 science fiction novelette by William Tenn

- Author: William Tenn
- Language: English
- Publication date: 1974

Alien Jews at the INZC on Venus, an impression by Cate Andrews

On Venus, Have We Got a Rabbi! is a 1974 science fiction novelette by William Tenn. At an Interstellar Neo-Zionist Congress convened on Venus, weird-looking aliens claim that they are Jews. This legal quagmire was ingeniously resolved by the Great Rabbi of Venus. The story satirizes the question "Who is a Jew?" It was first published in the anthology Wandering Stars: An Anthology of Jewish Fantasy and Science Fiction.

== Plot ==
The frame story is Milchik the TV repairman, the firsthand immediate witness of the events, who tells a "Mr. Important Journalist" in an eloquent and embellished way what has happened.

About half of the story is a lively explanation of why the Great Rabbi Smallman of Venus is so great and how Venus' administration loves the Jewish people, who Neozionists are, and why their congress was convened on Venus, and what a huge crowd of Jews from all over the galaxy had arrived. All Jewish living quarters are densely occupied, and one morning Milchick finds in his bathtub "three creatures, each as long as my arm and as thick as my head. They look like three brown pillows, all wrinkled and twisted, with some big gray spots on this side and on that side, and out of each gray spot is growing a short gray tentacle." His son explains him that they are the Bulbas, delegates from the fourth planet of Rigel.

And their accreditation has become a stumbling block of the opening session. The committee said their credentials are in order but for one small thing: they cannot be Jews. - But why? - Of all thises and that's, for starters the Jews have to be human. - Bulbas kindly ask for providing a quotation to this. - deputy chairman takes over the awkward situation: "But this is really simple: No one can be a Jew who is not the child of a Jewish mother." - But the Bulbas readily present their birth certificates to confirm that all of them have Jewish mothers... Someone calls to a vote, but there are as many opinions as delegates.

They've been accepted as delegates, and who are we to pass upon them as Jews? I'll accept them as Jews in the religious sense, someone else stands up to point out, but not in the biological sense. What kind of biological sense, he's asked by a delegate from across the hall; you don't mean biology, you mean race, you racist. All right, all right, cries out a little man who's sitting in front of him, but would you want your sister to marry one?

A High Rabbinical Court was convened and rabbi Smallman became its member after some manipulations. Bulbas tell their history before the court. Originally they were a small Orthodox community from Paramus, New Jersey, looking for a quiet place, which they thought they had found on Rigel IV, where the Bulbas were at the beginning of the Industrial Revolution. With the help of the industrious newcomers it brought big progress, but it was followed by big wars, big depressions, big dictatorships. And there was only one answer for the question who was guilty of all of this... And there was the first pogrom on Rigel IV... and then more... But Jews tried to strive for their living and to accommodate, and by the time an enlightened government took power, all Jews looked like plain Bulbas. "And they look like the weakest, poorest Bulbas of all, Bulbas of the very lowest class." And bulbas learned at the congress that this was happening everywhere. "After all, hadn't there been blonde Jews in Germany, redheaded Jews in Russia, black Jews—the Falashas—in Ethiopia, tall Mountain Jews in the Caucasus who had been as fine horsemen and marksmen as their neighbors?"

Bulbas were told that the change they described is against the experimental facts of biology. The Bulbas, who presented their complete genealogical charts, retorted: "Who are you going to believe, the experimental facts of biology—or your fellow Jews?"

And this turned out to be an important question: "Ruth was a Moabite, and from her came eventually King David. And how about Ezra and the problem of the Jewish men who took Canaanite wives? And where do you fit the Samaritans in all this? Jewish women, you'll remember, were not allowed to marry Samaritans. And what does Maimonides have to say on the subject?"

It was suggested that their problem may be resolved simply by conversion to Judaism. But others insisted that the procedure of conversion of people who already are Jews would be a mockery.

Eventually rabbi Smallman brought everybody to a common point of view. "To bring a bunch of Jews—and learned Jews!—to a single decision, that, my friend, is an achievement that can stand".

== History ==
The story was written in about seven years after the author's last published story (not counting reprints in collections).

In 2016 the Tablet Magazine reprinted the story with the preface which described the origin of the story. William Tenn decided to retire from writing and devote himself to professorship under his original name of Philip Klass. However, in 1973 he met with his fans at a sci-fi convention and addressing the question why he quit, he answered there is not much market for what he wanted to write and mentioned this particular title thinking it to be an example of a non-starter. But it turned out that one of the fans was planning a collection of Jewish science fiction, so William Tenn wrote what he described as " a small monument to Sholem Aleichem", "The result: a magisterial meditation on Jewish identity, history, persecution, and pathologies that is both deeply thoughtful and utterly hilarious."

In 1978 it was translated in German as Wir haben einen Rabbi auf der Venus and in 1998 in Russian as Таки у нас на Венере есть рабби!.

William Tenn delivered the reading of the story on WNYC's Spinning on Air with David Garland, November 22, 2002. The reading was accompanied by an interview.

== Discussion ==
Phil M. Cohen writes:

This hilarious story, which rings with Yiddish-inspired inflections and Sholom Aleichem's sardonic humor and style, is a romp through Jewish history, angst, and the perpetual foibles of the Jewish people as they argue over what comprises their identity. No matter when or where Jews may find themselves — even on Venus, with tentacles or without — they will always be a contentious people, rooted in sacred text, and looking over their shoulders at the past and straight ahead into the future with a sense of humor.

Bud Webster pinpoints the conflict as follows: Bulbas are not just aliens (after all, there were blue Jews from Aldebaran), they are not simply different, they are inhuman aliens. He writes that the solution is both properly Talmudic, and properly science-fictional: the Bulbas have sufficient human-ness, to transcend their non-humanity.

Nick Gevers wrote that the story shows "that even the oldest assumptions are perhaps more timeless than we think, and will make the future in their own, in this case distinctly rabbinical, image."

Walter Russell Mead, on an occasion of its republishing by Tablet, describes the story as "wry, funny, sharply observed and deeply human, it's a story that deserves a permanent place in the annals of science fiction, American literature and Jewish fiction. A Hanukkah present to the world from Tablet."
