= A Sense of Reality =

1963 short story collection by Graham Greene

- First edition
- Author: Graham Greene
- Language: English
- Publisher: The Bodley Head
- Publication date: 1963
- Publication place: United Kingdom
- Media type: Print (hardback & paperback)
- Pages: 140

A Sense of Reality is a collection of short stories by Graham Greene, first published in 1963. The book is composed of three short stories and a novella, Under the Garden. These stories share a marked change of style from Greene's usual format, with the author plunging into fantasy, dreams, false memories and imagination.

== Stories ==
- Under the Garden
- A Visit to Morin
- Dream of a Strange Land
- A Discovery in the Woods
