= For Whom the Bell Chimes =

1983 play by Graham Greene

For Whom the Bell Chimes is a three-act comedy, farce play written by Graham Greene. The play is set in a one-room, Omni-Studio apartment. Each act starts with the chime of the doorbell and the entrance of a new character and farce in the room.

== Characters ==
- 'X'
- Masterman ('Chips')
- Colonel Fenwick
- Sergeant
- Neighbour
- Inspector ('Ginger')
- RSPCA Man

== Plot ==
Act One opens with 'X' answering the doorbell of his apartment to a man called Masterman, dressed in shabby clothing collecting for the Anti-Child-Polio Campaign. Masterman is invited in and although 'X' is unable to offer him money, he gradually trades each item of his clothing for that of Mastermans. Once X has exchanged clothes with Masterman he steals Masterman's collection satchel and runs out of the apartment. Masterman is left alone in the apartment without his glasses, and during a search of the room discovers a body of a woman hidden on the fold down bed.

Act Two the doorbell chimes and Colonel Fenwick enters, claiming to be an investigator for the Anti-Child-Polio Campaign, on the trail of a man posing as a collector who he believes was just ahead of him in the apartment block. Whilst trying to conceal the discovered body, Masterman adopts the identity of the apartment owner and claims the fraudster tried to enter the apartment whilst he was in the bath. Colonel Fenwick begins a search of the apartment, and believing the fraudster to be hidden in the fold away bed starts banging holes through a hollow wall to get the bed out. Selecting the wrong wall, Fenwick only manages in breaking through to a neighbor's apartment.

Act Three the doorbell chimes again, and a local Sergeant enters the room escorting X with him. X claims to be the fraudster collecting charity donations under a false identity, whilst Masterman continues to play the part of the apartment owner. During these conversations they are joined by the angry neighbor claiming to have been attacked through the wall by Colonel Fenwick. The neighbor begins to search the apartment and soon discovers the woman's body hidden in the fold up bed. X and Masterman begin to change their stories, much to the Sergeants confusion. A Police Inspector is called, and upon entering the apartment Masterman recognizes him as 'Ginger', a former transvestite friend. During the commotion X makes a hasty exit, the Sergeant arrests Colonel Fenwick and an RSPCA man arrives in search of a reported, dead Pekinese.

== Productions ==
The play was first performed at The Haymarket Studio Theatre, Leicester on 20 March 1980, directed by Robin Midgley, with a cast including; Phil Bowen as 'X', Roy Macready as Masterman, Derek Smith as Colonel Fenwick. The play was performed in repertory with Greene's one-act play Yes and No.
