= The Human Angle =

Book by William Tenn

- First edition cover
- Author: William Tenn
- Cover artist: Richard M. Powers
- Language: English
- Genre: Science fiction
- Publisher: Ballantine Books
- Publication date: 1956
- Media type: Print (hardback & paperback)
- Pages: 152 pp

The Human Angle is the second collection of science fiction stories by American writer William Tenn, published simultaneously in hardback and paperback by Ballantine Books in 1956. Ballantine reprinted the collection in 1964 and 1968.

== Contents ==
The Human Angle contains the following stories.

- "Project Hush" (Galaxy 1954)
- "The Discovery of Morniel Mathaway" (Galaxy 1955)
- "Wednesday’s Child" (Fantastic Universe 1956)
- "The Servant Problem" (Galaxy 1955)
- "Party of the Two Parts" (Galaxy 1954)
- "The Flat-Eyed Monster" (Galaxy 1955)
- "The Human Angle" (Famous Fantastic Mysteries 1948)
- "A Man of Family" (original)

== Reception ==
New York Times reviewer Villiers Gerson praised the stories as "Mordant and suave, cruel and clever, saturnine and sentimental," noting that "if [Tenn] has a fault, it is that his writing is sometimes too clever, exhibiting too many fireworks."

== Sources ==
- Tuck, Donald H. (1974). The Encyclopedia of Science Fiction and Fantasy: Volume 1. Chicago: Advent: Publishers. ISBN 0-911682-20-1.
