= Yes and No (play) =

1980 lay by Graham Greene

Yes and No is a short one act play written by Graham Greene, consisting of a conversation between a fictional, unnamed Play Director and a fictional, unnamed Actor. The Actor's only lines, as the Director discusses the play script, are the words "Yes" or "No". Greene wrote the play following a dream; it was inspired by his observations of interactions between Sir John Gielgud, director, and Sir Ralph Richardson, actor, during rehearsals for the original 1959 production of The Complaisant Lover.

== Characters ==
- Director
- Actor

== Productions ==
The play was first performed at The Haymarket Studio Theatre, Leicester on 20 March 1980, with Derek Smith as 'Director' and William Hope as 'Actor'. The play was performed in repertory with Greene's For Whom the Bell Chimes. Smith and Hope appeared in both plays.

== Adaptations ==
In 1983, the stage play was adapted to a radio play for BBC Radio 3. The idea was suggested by Clive Francis, who played the role of Director, and was approved by John Tydeman, who directed the production. Alex Jennings played the role of Actor. The program was recorded on Tuesday, 25 January 1983. For the radio play, only the opening line, spoken by the Director, was altered. In the stage play, the Director begins, "Ah, punctual I see. A great virtue in a young actor. Have you been here long?" For the radio play, the Director's opening line was adapted to, "On stage waiting. Punctuality is a great virtue in a young actor. Have you been here long?"
