= Ray Ring (writer) =

American novelist and journalist

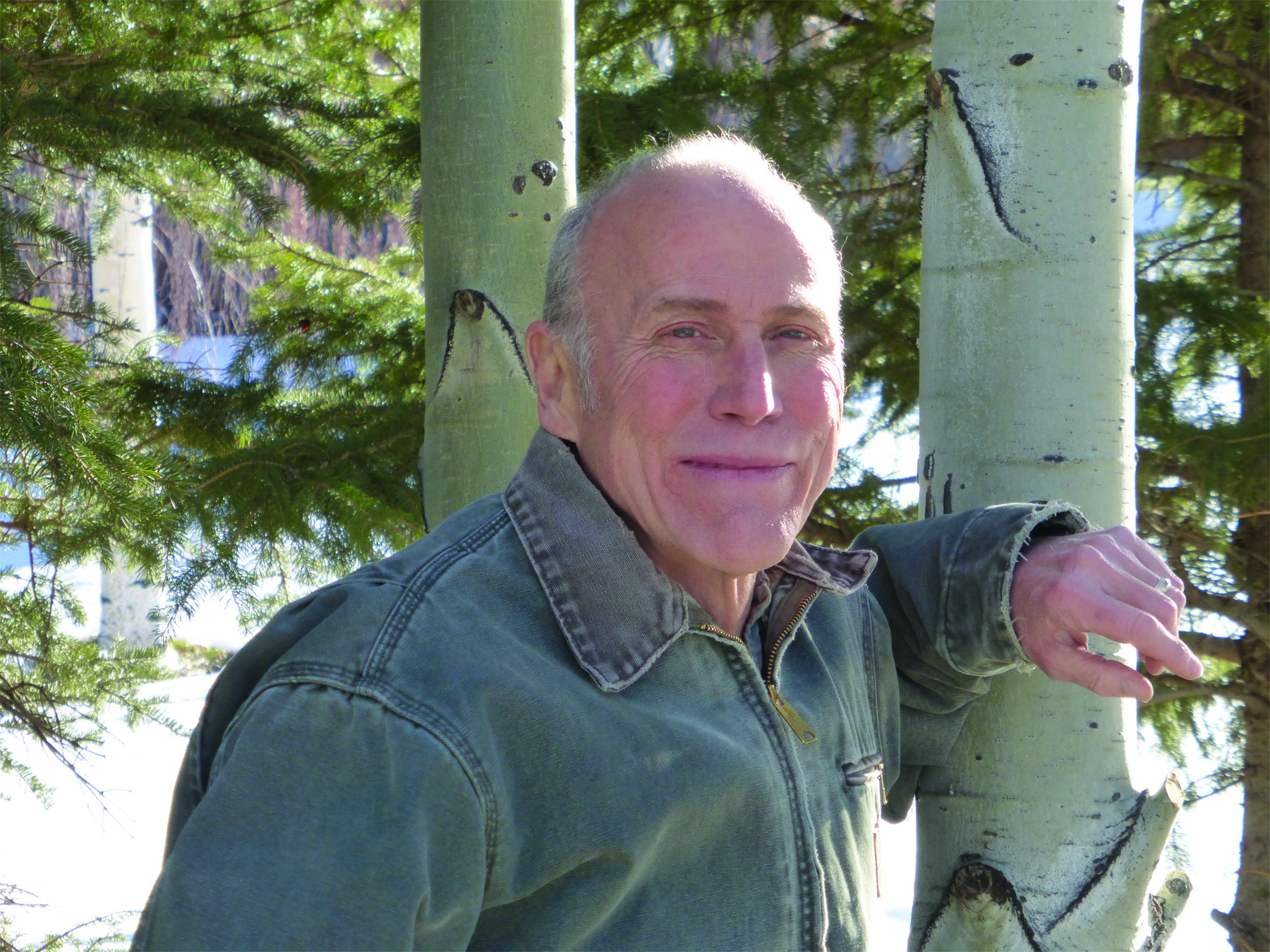
Ray Ring in Montana 2014

Ray H. Ring is an American novelist and journalist. Ring has been based in the American West since the 1970s, with stints in Arizona, Colorado and Montana.

== Novels ==
- Montana Blues (Writers Canyon Press, 2023) is an unusual mystery/thriller about a determined Black man and a spirited White woman who face racial violence on a spectacular landscape. A sample review in The Arizona Daily Star said it's a “compulsively readable new thriller … Ring’s flair for fully-realized characters and smart dialog is on display here; combined with fast-paced action, this is propulsive storytelling that will keep you on the edge of your seat.”
- Arizona Kiss (Little, Brown, 1991) is a noir suspense/thriller about a cynical Arizona journalist who investigates illegal dogfighting. Literary novelist Barbara Kingsolver praised Arizona Kiss for exploring "the shadowy borderlands between cynicism and amorality, and the ways violence can detonate a psyche. This is a rattlesnake of a book: its plot curves and coils and finally strikes, unforgettably." A review in Publishers Weekly described Arizona Kiss as a "steamy, pitiless, tough-as-whipcord thriller ... a rousing experience." The Times Literary Supplement, in London, described the novel as "a well-crafted tale of sexual obsession, treachery and violence ... in its own distinctive shade of noir." A passage from Arizona Kiss describing the journalist's role was excerpted in Columbia Journalism Review, and The National Council for the Training of Journalists, based in England, put Arizona Kiss on its list of "Eight works of fiction about life as a reporter that you should read."
- Telluride Smile (published by Dodd, Mead in 1988). Bloomsbury Review offered praise: "This campy first novel takes every trick in the standard formula gumshoe plot and stands them on their head for comic effect. Ring's tongue-in-cheek, alter ego thought experiment pits one Henry Dyer, a retired Arizona fish and game officer, against a host of seemingly insurmountable odds trying to pass themselves off as a popular Colorado ski resort. The result is a three-ring sideshow in the snow ..." The Denver Post described Telluride Smile as "a wonderfully bittersweet and entertaining satire of the state we all know and love." Newsday said, "In Telluride Smile ... the subject of the examination -- the behavior of affluent Americans in a modern ski resort -- is rendered flawlessly."
- Peregrine Dream (St. Martin's Press, 1990) continued Henry Dyer, the eccentric private eye introduced in Telluride Smile, with a wildlife-related murder case set in Tucson. Kirkus Reviews praised Peregrine Dream as "a wildlife story with more than its ideals going for it: Ring's sharp characterizations, vivid nature descriptions, and love of the land are wrapped up smartly in a well-conceived plot. A strong addition to the hard-boiled camp." The San Francisco Chronicle described the novel as "a stylized detective mystery in the tradition of Dashiell Hammett and Raymond Chandler -- fast-paced and sensuous, and told in a clipped, sarcastic voice. It is a tightly woven cloth of plots, subplots and sub-subplots; within the principal mystery are a dozen smaller mysteries ... What Ring offers is really a fable, a moody fable of the American West. Its conflicts are the conflicts that have defined the region for a century."

== Journalism Awards ==
- 1982 Investigative Reporters & Editors (Distinguished Investigative Reporting Scroll) for an undercover investigation of Arizona's prison system. As part of an Arizona Daily Star team, Ring posed as a convict for 10 days in maximum security and was roughed up by the Aryan Brotherhood gang. The prison investigation was also honored by an American Bar Association Gavel Award, and the Arizona Press Club's Don Bolles award for investigative journalism.
- 1984 Arizona Journalist of the Year, awarded by the Arizona Press Club, for "Taming the Forests," a detailed analysis of 80 years of mismanagement of national forests in Arizona, published in The Arizona Daily Star.
- 2003, 2004, 2005 Society of Environmental Journalists national awards—each year, a third place in a category (either beat reporting or explanatory journalism) that included large national news operations such as The New York Times and National Geographic teams. These awards recognized 10 High Country News story packages Ring wrote on topics around the West and nationwide.
- 2006 George Polk Award for political reporting, for "Taking Liberties," an investigation of a stealthy libertarian campaign pushing anti-regulation ballot measures in six Western states. The investigation, published in High Country News, was instrumental in the defeat—in elections or courtrooms—of most of the ballot measures.
- 2008 Sidney Hillman Foundation Award for social justice journalism, for "Death in the Energy Fields," a 2007 investigation of worker safety and fatalities in the oil and gas industry in seven Western states, published in High Country News. The investigative project had a different headline on the magazine's website: "Disposable Workers of the Oil and Gas Fields."
- 2009 Mental Health America national journalism award, for "My Crazy Brother," Ring's 2008 remembrance of his older brother's struggle with schizophrenia and ultimate suicide, published in High Country News. Ring made a brief YouTube video about the essay, and the video was played at the award ceremony.

== Personal life ==
Ring attended six universities, and earned a bachelor's in journalism at the University of Colorado Boulder in 1979. He took creative writing courses from William Tenn at Penn State and Buzz Poverman at the University of Arizona. He also designed and taught a course on environmental politics at Montana State University-Bozeman, as an adjunct in 2006–2007.

In his 20s, Ring held blue-collar jobs including city firefighter, taxi driver, and head of maintenance at the University of Colorado Mountain Research Station.
