= Proof Positive (Greene story) =

1930 short story by Graham Greene

"Proof Positive" is a short story by Graham Greene written in 1930 and first published in 1931 as the winner of the first prize (10 Guineas) in a newspaper ghost story competition.

== Publication ==
The story was collected in Greene's 1947 collection Nineteen Stories.

== Inspiration ==
The story was inspired by Edgar Allan Poe's short story "The Facts in the Case of M. Valdemar" (1845).

== Plot ==
The story concerns a meeting of the 'local Psychical Society' at which guest speaker, Major Weaver, claims to have 'proof positive' that 'the spirit does not die when the body dies'. The Major appears ill and carries a handkerchief with an overpoweringly sweet odor. As he speaks his words become increasingly disjointed until finally it degenerates into an 'odd jangling note' as he collapses back into his chair. A doctor from the audience rushes onstage, discards the handkerchief and pronounces him dead. As another more unpleasant smell can be detected the doctor whispers "The man must have been dead a week..."

== Radio adaptation ==
The story was dramatized for The Black Mass radio series broadcast on KPFA on June 3, 1964.
