= The Invisible Japanese Gentlemen =

1965 short story by Graham Greene

"The Invisible Japanese Gentlemen" is a short story written by Graham Greene in 1965. It was first published in The Saturday Evening Post in November 1965. It was contributed to The Complete Imbiber 9 in 1967. "The Invisible Japanese Gentlemen" and "The Root of All Evil" were included in May We Borrow Your Husband?.

== Plot ==
The story takes place in Bentley's, a restaurant in London (perhaps the same as the current Bentley's, 11–15 Swallow Street). The narrator is sitting at a table, alone, and observes a group of eight Japanese gentlemen having dinner together, and beyond them a young British couple. The Japanese speak quietly and politely amongst themselves, always smiling and bowing, toasting each other and making speeches in Japanese which the narrator does not understand and describes in patronizing, derogatory terms. Seven of the Japanese gentlemen wear glasses. They eat fish and later a fruit salad for dessert. They provide a mildly farcical background to the main focus of the narrator's attention, the couple.

Although they sit furthest away, the narrator catches their conversation. The pretty young woman is a writer who is about to be publish a book for the first time. She is describing her plans to her fiancé, how Mr. Dwight, her publisher, lauds her talent, and how she wants to travel the world, especially to France, in order to fuel her inspiration. She also wants to marry her young fiancé the following week, being convinced that their financial future is settled due to the inevitable success of her first book, The Chelsea Set.

Her fiancé is much more cautious and doubts that they should rely exclusively on the young woman's professional prospects and talent. His uncle could help him get into the wine trading business, a more mundane, but also safer life choice than to be the husband of a travelling author. The young woman, aggressively self-assertive and bossy, is angry at her fiancé for being indifferent about her projects. She, on the other hand, has no doubts about her powers of observation and her future success.

Throughout the story, the narrator, who is also a writer, makes sarcastic and cynical comments about the young woman's ambition and youthful enthusiasm. He sounds embittered, being probably in his forties or fifties, and certainly past his days of glory. He knows about the publishing business and is aware of the gap between a young author's expectations and the harsher, down-to-earth realities of a literary career. He is both jealous of the girl, because she is at the beginning of something and still has the ability to dream her future, and sympathetic, because she is young enough to be his daughter and he would like to communicate his experience to her so as to preserve her from disappointments. She is, after all, only a superficial, self-deluded arriviste. Lastly, the Japanese gentlemen's presence, and the elaborate formality in how they communicate to one another and celebrate, contrasts sharply with the ferocious discursive dispute that opposes the young woman and her fiancé, and which she wins, at least rhetorically. However, she fails to fulfill her supposed "powers of observation" by not noticing the presence of the Japanese gentlemen as her fiancé does.

== Adaptation ==
"The Invisible Japanese Gentlemen" was one of several Greene stories adapted for the 1970s British television series Shades of Greene. Denholm Elliott, starring Royce Mills and Celia Bannerman.
