= The Destructors =

1954 short story by Graham Greene

"The Destructors" is a 1954 short story written by Graham Greene, first published in Picture Post in two installments on July 24 and July 31 and subsequently collected in Twenty-One Stories later that year.

== Plot ==
Set in the mid-1950s, the story is about the "Wormsley Common Gang", a boys' gang named after the place where they live. The protagonist Trevor, or "T.", devises a plan to destroy a beautiful 200-year-old house that survived The Blitz. The gang accepts the plan by T., their new leader, and executes it when the owner of the house, Mr. Thomas (whom the gang call "Old Misery"), is away during a bank holiday weekend. Their plan is to destroy the house from inside, then tear down the remaining outer structure. Mr. Thomas returns home early, however, and the gang locks him in the outhouse. T. refuses to stop until the destruction job is complete, because even the facade is valuable and could be reused. Inside, they find a mattress filled with money—which they burn. The final destruction of the house occurs when a lorry pulls away a support pole from the side of the house. Mr. Thomas is released from the outhouse by the lorry driver to see the rubble of what once was his home. When the driver finds the situation funny, Mr. Thomas is incensed, but the driver is still unable to stop laughing.

== Television adaptation ==
"The Destructors" was adapted for television as part of the 1970s British drama series Shades of Greene. It starred Michael Byrne, Phil Daniels and Nicholas Drake, directed by Michael Apted with a TV debut for actor Andrew Paul.

== Allusions and references in other works ==
- In the film Donnie Darko (2001), the title character contributes to discussion of "The Destructors" in his English class, stating that the story is ironic—showing how destruction is a form of creation. A parent of a pupil protests the use of this book in the curriculum during a PTA meeting, implying that it inspired an incident of vandalism to the school—a broken water main (which flooded the building) and an axe in the head of the mascot statue—in a manner similar to the protagonists of Greene's story.
