= The Name of Action =

1930 novel by Graham Greene

First edition (publ. Heinemann, 1930)

The Name of Action is Graham Greene's second novel, published in 1930. The book was badly received by critics, and suffered poor sales. Greene later repudiated the book (along with his third novel Rumour at Nightfall) and it has remained out of print ever since.

== Title origins ==
The title of the book is derived from the famous "To be, or not to be" speech from William Shakespeare's play Hamlet.

Thus conscience does make cowards of us all
And thus the native hue of resolution
Is sicklied o'er with the pale cast of thought
And enterprises of great pith and moment
With this regard their currents turn awry
And lose the name of action. - Soft you now!

== Plot summary ==
Disillusioned by Britain, wealthy youth Oliver Chant is sent abroad to Trier (Germany) by UK Communist leader Kurtz. Kurtz had been exiled to Britain by Trier's new dictator Demassener and promised Oliver Chant that he'd be part of a dramatic rebellion. Chant arrives in Trier with orders to meet up with the underground party run by a Jewish poet, Joseph Kapper and comrades Torner (an artist) and Lintz (a shoe maker). It becomes apparent that the small faction are not interested in bloodshed, but spreading dissent against the Dictator only by literature and posters.

By a strange turn of events the dictator's wife, Anne-Marie Demassener, enters the party's quarters seeking help from a minor car accident. She claims that her husband is more than aware of what these men do and isn't in the least concerned. Oliver Chant is invited to meet her husband that night, where he witnesses the mother of an executed gun runner come pleading for her son's body. Over the course of the evening Chant becomes infatuated with the dictator's wife. He heads back after the town's curfew, and after being cornered by local police is rescued by the poet Kapper, who shoots the policeman dead in the street. Kapper and Chant dispose of the body in the canal and then send Kapper's wife out with a tray of raw butcher's meat to spread over the area where the murder took place. In the morning Kapper and Chant argue over the murder, and further conflict arises when Kapper shows him the party's next propaganda poster which is a slur on the dictator's wife. Chant vows to leave the group and the country. He visits Anne-Marie Demassener to bid farewell and to declare his love for her. During his visit the owner of a canal boat enters, and tells her of the murdered policeman he fished out of the river. Anne-Marie presumes Chant is involved and tells him to leave the country; he proposes that she come with him, which (though unhappy herself) she mockingly rejects. Chant vows to stay on in Trier and try and fight for her. He goes back and, overruling a humiliated Kapper, leads the party on a planned rebellion. Chant arranges for a risky liaison to smuggle in arms by canal boat. Anne-Marie is destined to interfere with his plans again, making him question the motive for his involvement and giving Kapper an opportunity to lead the party to success by other means.

== Repudiation ==
In his autobiography Ways of Escape Greene spoke of this book and its subsequent repudiation:

My second and third novels, The Name of Action and Rumour at Nightfall, published in 1930 and 1931, can now be found, I am glad to think, only in secondhand bookshops at an exaggerated price, since some years after their publication I suppressed them. Both books are of a badness beyond the power of criticism properly to evoke—the prose flat and stilted... The main characters in a novel must necessarily have some kinship to the author, they come out of his body as a child comes from the womb, then the umbilical cord is cut, and they grow into independence. The more the author knows of his own character the more he can distance himself from his invented characters and the more room they have to grow in. With these early novels the cord has not been cut, and the author at twenty-six was as unreal to himself, in spite of psychoanalysis at sixteen, as Oliver Chant, the hero of The Name of Action, is to the reader. Chant is only a daydream in the mind of a young romantic author, for it takes years of brooding and of guilt, of self-criticism and of self-justification, to clear from the eyes the haze of hopes and dreams and false ambitions. I was trying to write my first political novel, knowing nothing of politics. I hope I did better many years later with The Quiet American, but how little I had learned of life and politics during three years in the sub-editors’ room of The Times.
