= Rumour at Nightfall =

1931 novel by Graham Greene

First edition (publ. Heinemann)

Rumour at Nightfall is the third novel by Graham Greene, published in 1931. Like his second novel, The Name of Action, it failed to repeat the success of his first novel, The Man Within; Greene was to suppress both his second and third novels.

== Epigraph ==
"O ye that stand upon the brink,
Whom I so near me through the chink
With wonder see: What faces there,
Whose fcet, whose bodies, do ye wear?
I my companions see
In you, another me.
They seeméd others, but are we;
Our second selves those shadows be."

- Thomas Traherne

== Plot summary ==
The First Carlist War is coming to an end. The pretender's most loyal fighter, Caveda refuses to submit and continues to defy the new government, pursued by an army led by Colonel Riego.

English journalist, Francis Chase has been in Spain covering the story for the last two years, travelling with Colonel Riego's outfit on the trail of Caveda. After a skirmish with rebels in which Colonel Riego's son is killed, Francis Chase discovers a mail bag which contains a clue that may lead them to Caveda. The bag contains some personal items of Caveda, including letters, gloves and a photograph of a young woman. Chase separates from the outfit, and heads to the town of San Juan alone to try and locate the woman in the photograph.

He returns to the Inn where he previously stayed, to find to his surprise his friend and colleague Michael Crane. Crane has left the London newspaper, and arrived in Spain some months ago. With Crane's help, they track down the woman in the photograph, Eulelia Monti. Chase meets with Eulelia Monti, who he finds is Caveda's mistress, though is not in love with him. Meanwhile, Crane sees a man leave the building who he believes is Caveda and tracks him to a bar in town.

Following the destruction of San Juan's bridge by Caveda's men, Colonel Riego arrives in town, and executes a local barber, a known Caveda informer. Michael Crane becomes infatuated by Eulelia Monti and betrays Chase, by informing her that Chase cannot be trusted.

Chase is concerned for his friends well being, and advises Crane to leave San Juan on horseback, and to deliver a message to his newspaper. On the ride out of town, Crane meets Eulelia Monti who advises him that Caveda is planning an uprising at the funeral of the barber the next morning. Crane announces his love for Eulelia Monti, and they ride back into San Juan and are married in secret. Chase meets with General Diaz and Colonel Riego and advises that his friend, Crane knows where Caveda is located and can identify him.

Chase begins to feel a kinship with the elusive Caveda, and feels guilt over his involvement in the plan to capture him. He is then surprised when Crane returns to the Inn, and advises he has married Eulelia Monti. Furious with his friend, Chase goes in search of Caveda to warn him of the plan to capture him and how his friend, Crane has betrayed them both.

== Repudiation ==
In his second autobiography, Ways of Escape, Greene wrote:

My second and third novels, The Name of Action and Rumour at Nightfall, published in 1930 and 1931, can now be found, I am glad to think, only in secondhand bookshops at an exaggerated price, since some years after their publication I suppressed them. Both books are of a badness beyond the power of criticism properly to evoke—the prose flat and stilted and in the case of Rumour at Nightfall, pretentious (the young writer had obviously been reading again and alas! admiring Conrad's worst novel, The Arrow of Gold), the characterization nonexistent.

According to the publishers' reports, William Heinemann (U.K. publisher) sold only 1,200 copies and Doubleday Doran (U.S. publisher) sold only 1,018 copies.
