= Alas, Poor Maling =

1940 short story by Graham Greene

"Alas, Poor Maling" is a short story by Graham Greene. It was first published in 1940.

== Plot summary ==
The story is told in first person by an unnamed narrator who has a friend named Maling. Maling is afflicted with an unusual medical affliction which his doctors label "borborygmi" and his friends label "tummy rumbles". Maling's case of this disease is unusual in that his stomach rumblings echo sounds they have recently "heard". An example is given where Maling's stomach repeats the opening of a Brahms Concerto. The narrator then tells the story of how Maling's unusual stomach condition caused the bankruptcy of the company he worked for.

During an important meeting in which Maling's company negotiated a merger, Maling's stomach imitates the air raid siren that was sounded in London during the Blitz. The officers of the company retreat to a bomb shelter because Maling is ashamed to admit that his stomach is responsible. As no all-clear is sounded, the officers remain in the shelter for twelve hours, ruining the attempted merger and leading the company to bankruptcy.

Written in the midst of the Blitz, "Alas, Poor Maling" is intended to raise the morale of a demoralized London. The story also calls into question the practicality of social etiquette, for if Maling had admitted to his stomach condition, the problem could have been avoided.

== Television adaptation ==
"Alas, Poor Maling" was one of several Greene stories to be adapted for the 1975-76 British television drama series Shades of Greene, starring John Bird as Maling. Greene adapted the screenplay himself.
