= Across the Bridge (short story) =

1938 short story by Graham Greene

- Short story by Graham Greene
- Country: United Kingdom
- Language: English
- Genre: Short story

Publication
- Published in: Nineteen Stories
- Publication type: Anthology
- Publisher: The Bodley Head
- Media type: Print (hardback & paperback)
- Publication date: 1938

"Across the Bridge" is a 1938 short story by Graham Greene. It was published in the 1947 collection Nineteen Stories. The work was adapted into a 1957 film, starring Rod Steiger, and a 2001 film, Double Take, starring Eddie Griffin and Orlando Jones.

== Plot ==
The story is told in first-person by an unnamed narrator who reveals little about himself besides that he is a wandering stranger stranded in a small Mexican border village. The narrator is fascinated by Joseph Calloway, a famous con man believed to be extremely wealthy, who is in the Mexican village on the run from the law. The narrator claims to feel sympathy not for Calloway but for Calloway's dog, an ugly creature he repeatedly kicks. Two detectives enter the village looking for Calloway, but though they have several conversations with the con man, they never realize he is their quarry. Meanwhile, Calloway, overcome by homesickness for America, manages to get himself secreted across the border. In the end, Calloway is killed by the detectives' car, apparently while trying to save the dog's life, and the truth about the human experience isn't revealed. The narrator claims to find something comic at the end of Calloway's life. He writes, "Death doesn't change comedy to tragedy." The reader is left to evaluate the meaning of this statement and weigh both the story's tragic and comic elements.

The story builds its tension on dramatic irony, with the narrator knowing more about the story than both Calloway and the detectives and the Mexican natives knowing more than the narrator, who says, "Any man doing dusty business in any of the wooden booths in the town is better fitted by long observation to tell Mr Calloway's tale than I am."
