= May We Borrow Your Husband? (short story collection) =

1967 short story collection by Graham Greene

- First edition
- Author: Graham Greene
- Language: English
- Genre: Short stories
- Publisher: The Bodley Head
- Publication date: 1967
- Publication place: United Kingdom
- Media type: Print (hardback & paperback)
- Pages: 188
- ISBN: 0140092374

May We Borrow Your Husband? and Other Comedies of the Sexual Life is a collection of short stories by British writer Graham Greene, first published in 1967. As the title suggests, this collection of twelve stories belongs to what Greene himself often described as entertainments. The stories are quite diverse, ranging as they do in gender, location and era and in genre, from farce to melodrama to tragedy and occasionally all of those genres at once.

== Stories ==
- May We Borrow Your Husband?
- Beauty
- Chagrin in Three Parts
- The Over-night Bag
- Mortmain
- Cheap in August
- A Shocking Accident
- The Invisible Japanese Gentlemen
- Awful When You Think of It
- Doctor Crombie
- The Root of All Evil
- Two Gentle People
