= Across the Bridge (film) =

1957 British film by Ken Annakin

- Directed by: Ken Annakin
- Screenplay by: Guy Elmes; Dennis Freeman
- Based on: "Across the Bridge" by Graham Greene
- Produced by: John Stafford
- Starring: Rod Steiger; David Knight; Marla Landi; Noel Willman
- Cinematography: Reginald Wyer
- Edited by: Alfred Roome
- Music by: James Bernard
- Production company: Independent Film Producers
- Distributed by: The Rank Organisation
- Release date: 20 August 1957 (London)
- Running time: 103 minutes
- Country: United Kingdom
- Language: English

Across the Bridge is a 1957 British thriller film directed by Ken Annakin and starring Rod Steiger, David Knight, Marla Landi, Noel Willman and Bernard Lee. It was written by Guy Elmes and Dennis Freeman, based on the 1938 short story of the same title by Graham Greene. A fugitive impersonates another man to evade the authorities.

It was released by The Rank Organisation on August 20, 1957.

== Plot ==
Businessman Carl Schaffner flees to Mexico with the police hot on his heels after embezzling company funds. He has a fortune stashed in a Mexican bank to keep it out of reach of the British authorities.

While travelling by train, Schaffner drugs and switches identities with fellow train passenger Paul Scarff, who looks like him and has a Mexican passport. He throws Scarff off the train, injuring Scarff. As part of the ruse, Schaffner is forced to take possession of Scarff's dog, Dolores. The plan seems foolproof, but it backfires when Schaffner discovers that Scarff is a wanted political assassin. Schaffner tracks down Scarff, who is incapacitated by his injuries, and gets back his original passport.

Schaffner arrives in Mexico and is captured by the local police, who mistake him for Scarff. Schaffner has to reveal his true identity to the local police, but at first he is not believed. He tells the Mexican police where to find the real Scarff and they pass the information to the American police, and Scarff is killed when they go to arrest him.

The local Mexican police chief, who at first seemed amenable to Schaffner's approaches to bribe him, connects with Scotland Yard's Chief Inspector Hadden. They conspire to keep Schaffner trapped in the Mexican border town of Katrina, and then will try to get him to cross the bridge into the U.S., where he can be apprehended. The misanthropic Schaffner has by now grown attached to Scarff's pet spaniel. He is tricked by Hadden and the police chief into having to cross the dividing line of the bridge to recover the dog. Schaffner realises what is happening, but is determined to get the dog back. He is accidentally killed when he tries to run back across the border and a police car knocks him down.

== Cast ==
- Rod Steiger as Carl Schaffner
- David Knight as Johnny
- Marla Landi as Mary
- Noel Willman as Chief of Police
- Bernard Lee as Chief Inspector Hadden
- Eric Pohlmann as police sergeant
- Alan Gifford as Cooper
- Ingeborg von Kusserow as Mrs. Scarff (as Ingeborg Wells)
- Bill Nagy as Paul Scarff
- Faith Brook as Kay
- Stanley Maxted as Milton
- Marianne Deeming as Anna

== Production ==
Film rights to Graham Greene's short story "Across the Bridge" were owned by Sydney Box who unsuccessfully attempted to make the film in the early 1950s in Spain.

Box recommended Ken Annakin direct. Annakin arranged for the second half of the script to depart from Greene's story but producer John Stafford, close to Greene, insisted it be changed to be more faithful. Annakin later wrote, "In shooting the movie, I followed the story line as laid down by John, and I will never know whether we might have had more commercial success with Guy’s more sexy version, but one thing is sure, I could never complain at the tremendous and permanent acclaim the movie won throughout the world."

The story was expanded by the screenwriter to provide a backstory for the lead character Carl Schaffner played by Rod Steiger. Steiger accepted the role not long after achieving fame for his role in On the Waterfront. Charles Laughton had originally been proposed for the lead. Rank agreed to finance the whole film including Steiger's fee. It was decided to film the movie in Spain; the studio was making an increasing number of movies overseas at the time.

In his autobiography, the director Ken Annakin recalled that once Steiger had studied his lines, he never referred to the script for the entire shoot. Annakin travelled by train from New York to Laredo, Texas to scout locations. However, most exteriors were shot in Lora del Río, Spain, about an hour outside Seville. It was photographed by cinematographer Reginald Wyer. Only establishing shots were filmed in the United States, using a documentary film crew.

Filming started 21 January 1957. Annakin wrote, "Shooting Across The Bridge was the happiest time I had ever experienced. The village of Lora del Río took us into its bosom — it was ours to shoot, adapt, and do whatever we wanted. I felt a new exhilaration, setting out each day like a painter knowing the shape of what I was going to shoot, but not the details. Like Rod, I was free to create, completely attuned to every nuance of the story and characters. I have never been more relaxed, nor have I ever had less sleep!"

According to his obituary, this was director Annakin's favourite of his own.

== Release ==
Annakin later wrote the film "opened in London to great critical acclaim, gaining the most wonderful notices I have ever had. One critic called the picture "the Saviour of Pinewood Studios". John Davis acclaimed me as Rank's greatest director!" However, the film only had a limited release in the USA.

== Critical reception ==
The Monthly Film Bulletin wrote: "Across the Bridge is one of the most efficient and individual films made in Britain for some time. Adapted from a short story by Graham Greene, the film carries its author's unmistakable imprint in its emphasis on human squalor and despair. Ken Annakin's tightly paced direction, assisted by a thoroughly mannered but effective performance by Rod Steiger, capture the perverse fascination of the ruthless Carl Schaffner; and the film is most forceful and balanced in its concentrated character study of the murderous runagate financier. What the picture lacks, however, is a definite centre. In the first part of the film Schaffner is the protagonist and interest stems from seeing how far he can go in eluding capture. Once across the bridge, when Schaffner becomes caught in a trap of his own making, he becomes the victim: his final act of trying to free the dog is cunningly motivated (the dog had saved his life) but hardly acceptable in terms of the character study that has preceded it. The film consequently falls away into a weak conclusion: Schaffner's death, mourned only by a whimpering dog, brings with it no sense of catharsis, and the film seems to have fallen victim to its own aridity."

The Radio Times Guide to Films gave the film 4/5 stars, writing: "Rod Steiger takes on the ultimate scene-stealer – a small dog – and just about wins in this thriller, adapted from a Graham Greene story. Steiger plays a fraudster on the run who murders a man and assumes his identity, only to discover his victim is also a fugitive. His attempts to escape are further hampered when he becomes attached to the dead man's mangy mongrel. There was friction between director Ken Annakin and his star during production, but Steiger gives one of his best and most poignant performances."

In British Sound Films: The Studio Years 1928–1959 David Quinlan rated the film as "good", writing: "Overlong but powerful drama; Steiger gives it all he's got."

Leslie Halliwell said: "This star tour de force is unconvincing in detail and rather unattractive to watch (British films never could cope with American settings), but the early sequences have suspense."

Britmovie's review of the film singles out Steiger's performance as one of the film's highlights: "Rod Steiger produces a gripping and highly charismatic performance as the conceited financier trapped in limbo with luck running out."

== Remake ==
An American comedy remake, Double Take, was released in 2001.
