= The Lost Childhood and Other Essays =

Book by Graham Greene

- First edition
- Author: Graham Greene
- Cover artist: Stein
- Language: English
- Genre: Essay collection
- Publisher: Eyre & Spottiswoode
- Publication date: 1951
- Publication place: United Kingdom

The Lost Childhood and Other Essays is a collection of essays and book reviews by Graham Greene published in 1951. Two of its four parts, Personal Prologue (i.e. The Lost Childhood) and Personal Postscript, comprise seven invaluable pieces of autobiography.

The part Novels and Novelists collects Greene's more or less professional looks at fellow writers, variously esteemed or deplored or fondly remembered, while Some Characters expands to takes in poets and other artists as well.

== Novels and Novelists ==
- Henry James: the Private Universe
- Henry James: the Religious Aspect
- The Portrait of a Lady
- The Plays of Henry James
- The Lesson of the Master - also on James
- The Young Dickens
- Fielding and Sterne
- From Feathers to Iron - on Robert Louis Stevenson (the cousin of Greene's mother)
- Francois Mauriac
- The Burden of Childhood - on Rudyard Kipling and Hector Hugh Munro
- Man Made Angry - on Léon Bloy
- Walter de la Mare's Short Stories
- The Saratoga Trunk - on Dorothy Richardson
- The Poker-face - on Hesketh Pearson's biography of Conan Doyle
- Ford Madox Ford
- Frederick Rolfe: Edwardian Inferno - on Baron Corvo
- Frederick Rolfe: From the Devil's Side
- Frederick Rolfe: A Spoiled Priest
- Remembering Mr Jones - on Joseph Conrad
- The Domestic Background - also on Conrad, concerning his married life
- Isis Idol - on Charles Mallet's biography of Anthony Hope
- The Last Buchan - on Baron Tweedsmuir
- Beatrix Potter
- Harkaway's Oxford - on stories by Edwin J Brett in the Boys' Own Paper
- The Unknown War - on more recent stories in the B.O.P. and similar publications

== Some Characters ==
- Francis Parkman
- Samuel Butler
- The Ugly Act - on John Connell's biography of W. E. Henley
- Eric Gill
- Invincible Ignorance - on Havelock Ellis
- Herbert Read
- George Darley
- An Unheroic Dramatist - on Roger Boyle, 1st Earl of Orrery
- Dr Oates of Salamanca - on Jane Lane's biography of Titus Oates
- A Hoax on Mr Hulton - on London tradesmen in the days of Bonnie Prince Charlie
- Don in Mexico - on Cambridge professor J.B.Trend
- Portrait of a Maiden Lady - on Beverley Nichols
- Mr Cook's Century - on Thomas Cook
- Great Dog of Weimar - on the painter Mathilde, Baroness von Freytag-Loringhoven
