= The Fallen Idol (film) =

1948 film by Carol Reed

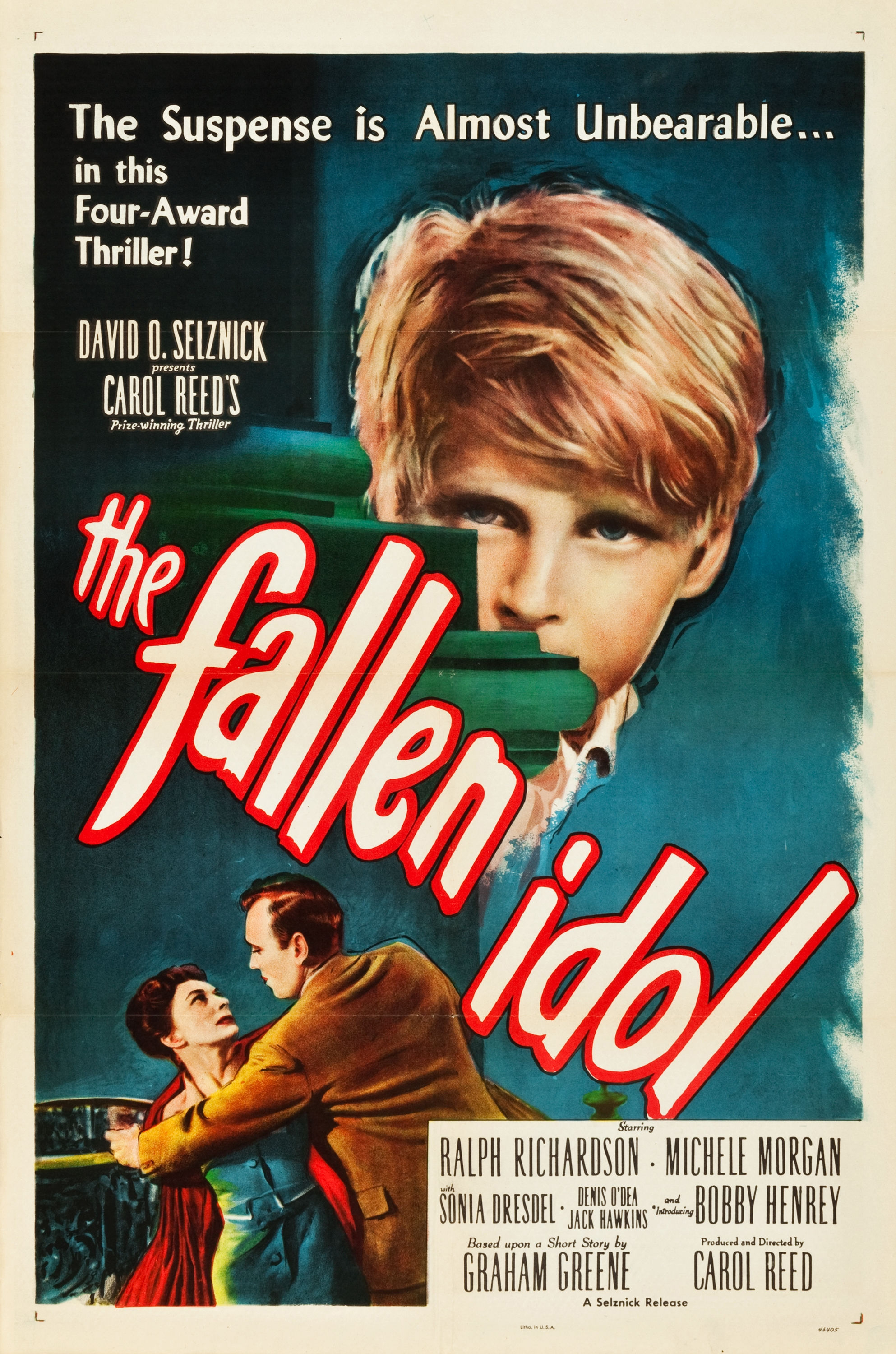
- U.S. theatrical release poster
- Directed by: Carol Reed
- Written by: Graham Greene; William Templeton; Lesley Storm
- Based on: "The Basement Room"; 1936 story in Twenty-One Stories by Graham Greene
- Produced by: Carol Reed
- Starring: Ralph Richardson; Bobby Henrey; Michèle Morgan; Denis O'Dea; Jack Hawkins
- Cinematography: Georges Périnal
- Edited by: Oswald Hafenrichter
- Music by: William Alwyn
- Production company: London Film Productions
- Distributed by: British Lion Films
- Release date: 30 September 1948
- Running time: 95 minutes
- Country: United Kingdom
- Language: English
- Budget: £397,568
- Box office: £215,823 (UK)

The Fallen Idol (also known as The Lost Illusion) is a 1948 British mystery thriller film directed by Carol Reed, and starring Ralph Richardson, Bobby Henrey, Michèle Morgan, and Denis O'Dea. Its plot follows the young son of a diplomat in London, who comes to suspect that his family's butler, whom he idolises, has committed a murder. It is based on the 1936 short story "The Basement Room", by Graham Greene.

The film was nominated for the Academy Award for Best Director (Carol Reed) and Best Adapted Screenplay (Graham Greene), and won the BAFTA Award for Best British Film.

== Plot ==
The young son of the ambassador of a French-speaking European country, Philippe lives a lonely life at the embassy in Belgrave Square, London. Philippe's mother has been in hospital for months and his father is frequently absent. The butler, Baines, keeps Phillipe entertained by telling stories of his daring adventures in Africa and elsewhere, where he claims to have killed a man in self-defense and vanquished lions. As a result, Philippe idolises him. By contrast, Philippe hates Baines's wife, the housekeeper, who is very strict with him.

One afternoon, when Philippe's father is away, Philippe slips out of the house alone. He finds Baines in a tea shop, talking to Julie, a typist from the embassy. The couple have been carrying on a relationship, but Julie wishes to end it and has already booked to leave for the Continent. Philippe is oblivious to the meaning of their conversation and accepts Baines's explanation that Julie is his niece. Baines asks Philippe not to mention the meeting to his wife.

Later, Baines tries to tell his wife that he wants out of their marriage. She cuts him off, then announces she is leaving to spend the night with an aunt.

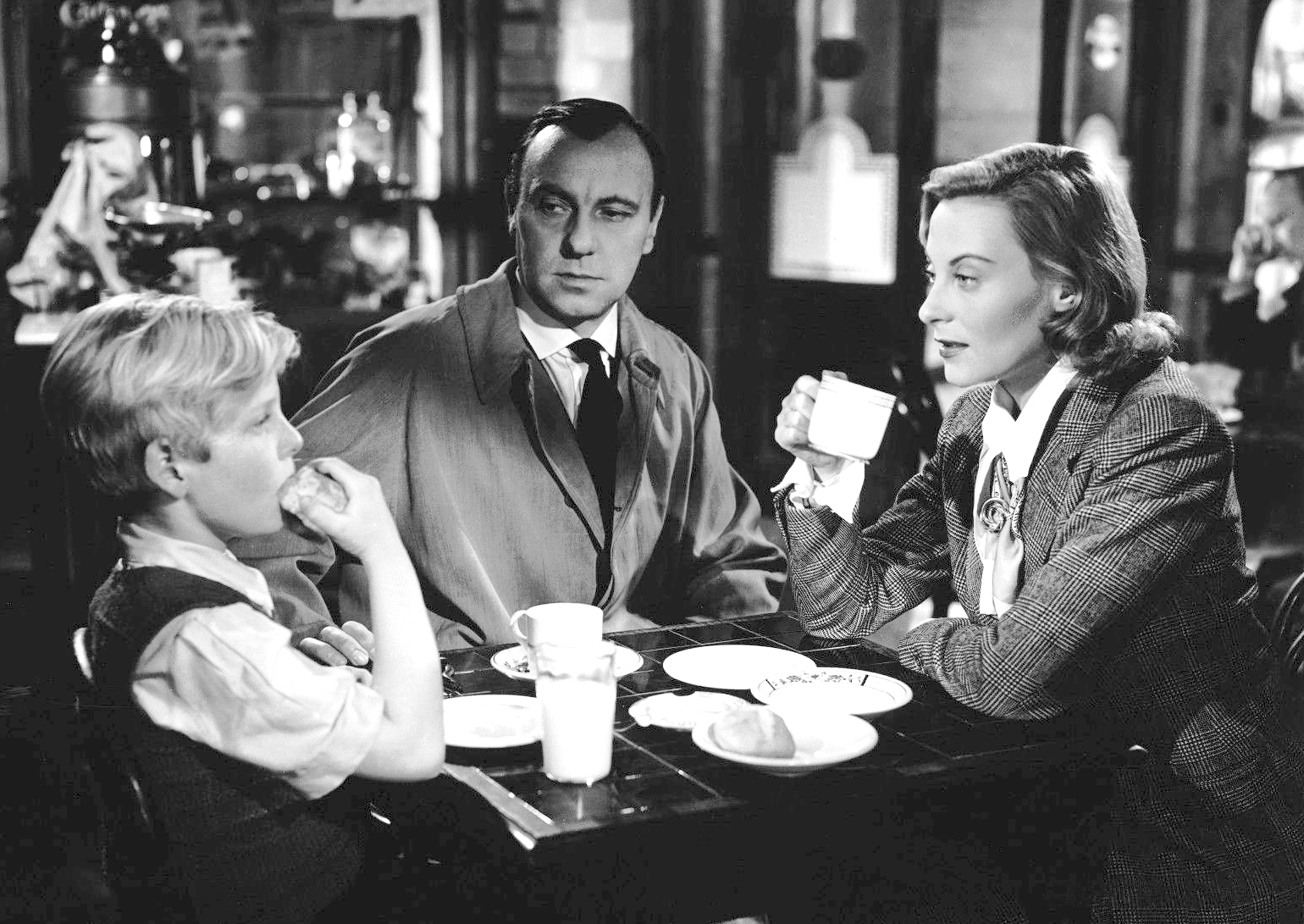
Bobby Henrey, Ralph Richardson and Michèle Morgan in The Fallen Idol

The next morning, Mrs. Baines pretends to leave on her trip but doubles back. Baines takes Philippe to London Zoo, where Julie joins them. They all return to the house, believing Mrs Baines is not there. A telegram from Mrs Baines awaits them, saying she will return in two days. Baines, Julie and Philippe have a "picnic dinner" and play hide-and-seek. Mrs. Baines spies on them, and later awakens Philippe, demanding to know where Julie is. He yells to alert Baines. Baines arrives and there is a struggle at the top of the main staircase. Mr. Baines tells his wife to go downstairs and they will talk later. He then withdraws toward the guest room. Determined to see if Julie is in the room, Mrs. Baines steps onto a ledge high above the staircase, to peer over a terrace. When she leans against the window, it pivots outward at the top, sweeping her off her feet and sending her plunging to her death.

Philippe does not see the fall and thinks Baines must have pushed her. Terrified and confused, he flees the house barefoot in his pajamas. He is stopped by a policeman patrolling his beat. After being questioned at Chelsea police station and refusing to say what happened, Philippe is returned to the embassy. Baines has already sent Julie home, and leaves her out of the account he gives the police. A doctor is called to certify Mrs Baines' death as an accident, but he recognizes Philippe and questions him on why he ran away. His suspicions aroused, the doctor requests the police physician be sent for, to open an official enquiry. Detective Ames of Scotland Yard arrives to investigate, and observes the three places set for dinner, which casts doubt on Baines's story. Ames announces he will return in the morning.

Julie visits the house the following morning. Soon after, Detective Ames and Inspector Crowe arrive, along with their investigators. Julie attempts to leave, but as she is a typist, the police ask her to stay to transcribe their interviews. When Crowe and Ames interrogate Philippe, he denies that Mrs. Baines slapped him, or that Julie ever visited the house. Julie overhears Philippe concealing the truth, and implores him, in French, to be honest.

Philippe attempts to make off with the telegram Mrs. Baines sent, but it is confiscated by the police as further evidence against Baines. Baines tells the truth, but the police do not believe him. Before being taken to police headquarters, Baines goes to his basement quarters to get his things. Philippe follows him. Philippe overheard Baines telling the police his fantastical stories weren't true, and that he's only ever once been abroad - to Ostend. He tearfully asks Baines if it's true. Baines admits they were fantasies. When he opens the bureau drawer, he sees his pistol and contemplates suicide.

Upstairs two investigators find a woman's footprint in the spilt soil from a potted plant on the window ledge above the main staircase, which appears to confirms Baines' story. The accusation against Baines is retracted. Julie goes to the basement and informs him. Philippe, finally convinced that he must tell the truth, tries to explain that the footprint was left in a row he'd had with Mrs. Baines two days earlier. However, Inspector Crowe has already heard Philippe tell too many lies and won't listen.

The police leave, and Baines and Julie share a brief moment of renewed affection. Moments later Philippe's father and mother arrive. Halfway up the stairs Phillippe appears to barely recognise his parents. Resignedly, he slowly descends the steps, one at a time.

== Cast ==
- Ralph Richardson as Baines
- Michèle Morgan as Julie
- Sonia Dresdel as Mrs. Baines
- Bobby Henrey as Philippe
- Denis O'Dea as Chief Inspector Crowe
- Jack Hawkins as Detective Ames
- Walter Fitzgerald as Dr Fenton
- Dandy Nichols as Mrs. Patterson
- Joan Young as Mrs. Barrow
- Karel Stepanek as First Secretary
- Gerard Heinz as Ambassador
- Torin Thatcher as Police Constable
- James Hayter as Perry, a footman
- Geoffrey Keen as Detective Davis (credited as Geoffrey Keene)
- Bernard Lee as Inspector Hart, Special Branch
- John Ruddock as Dr Wilson
- Hay Petrie as Clock Winder
- Dora Bryan as Rose
- George Woodbridge as Sergeant, Chelsea Police Station

== Production ==
Filming began on 17 September 1947. The first location scene to be filmed was of Philippe running across Belgrave Square in London. The script departs significantly from the original 1936 story. In "The Basement Room," Mrs. Baines dies while struggling with her husband in a jealous rage; the mistress is not a Frenchwoman; and the boy (here simply Philip) does not deliberately lie to protect Baines.

== Release ==
=== Critical response ===
At the time of its release, the film was well reviewed. The Monthly Film Bulletin called the film "outstanding." In his Film Guide, Leslie Halliwell remarked, "A near perfect piece of small scale cinema built up from clever nuances of acting and cinematic technique."; awarding it a rare 3 stars out of four on his non-linear scale. Dilys Powell observed that, "A short story has become a film which is compact without loss of variety in pace and shape", whilst American, Pauline Kael, was less favourable in her review, "It's too deliberate and hushed to be much fun... you wait an extra beat between the low-key lines of dialogue."

=== Box office ===
It was one of the most popular movies at the British box office in 1948. According to Kinematograph Weekly the 'biggest winner' at the box office in 1948 Britain was The Best Years of Our Lives with Spring in Park Lane being the best British film and "runners up" being It Always Rains on Sunday, My Brother Jonathan, Road to Rio, Miranda, An Ideal Husband, The Naked City, The Red Shoes, Green Dolphin Street, Forever Amber, Life with Father, The Weaker Sex, Oliver Twist, The Fallen Idol and The Winslow Boy.

As of 30 June 1949 the film earned £203,000 in the UK of which £150,553 went to the producer. According to British Lion records the film had incurred a loss of £247,035

=== Legacy ===
More than a half century later, the film has continued to attract critical attention. In 2006, William Arnold wrote "Anyone who needs to be reminded how great the movies used to be should hustle on down to the Varsity this week to catch its new-print revival of the British classic The Fallen Idol." Arnold summarized Pauline Kael's earlier review, "the plot (which is based on Greene's short story "The Basement Room") is 'just about perfect', and so are the performances, Reed's Oscar-nominated direction and the dizzying art direction and camerawork that uncannily evoke the terrifying helplessness of childhood." Ty Burr wrote "the movie's a lasting pleasure: Reed's incisive direction; Greene's easy yet weighted dialogue; the farseeing deep-focus photography of Georges Perinal; Vincent Korda's luxuriant sets. Sir Ralph, in one of his very few starring roles in a movie, gives Baines the weary sharpness of a man who's smarter than his social betters yet knows enough never to show it."

The Fallen Idol was included at number 45 on Time Out magazine's 2022 list of the "100 best British films", which polled critics and members of the film industry. It was described as "one of the finest British films about children, about the ways they can be manipulated and betrayed, their loyalties misplaced and their emotions toyed with."

=== Accolades ===
Institution	Category	Recipient(s)	Result	Ref.
Academy Awards	Best Adapted Screenplay	Graham Greene	Nominated	
Academy Awards	Best Director	Carol Reed	Nominated	
Bodil Awards	Best Non-American Film	The Fallen Idol	Won	
BAFTA Awards	Best Film	The Fallen Idol	Won	
Golden Globe Awards	Best Foreign Film	The Fallen Idol	Nominated	
National Board of Review	Top Ten Films of the Year	The Fallen Idol	Won	
National Board of Review	Best Actor	Ralph Richardson	Won	
National Board of Review	Best Adapted Screenplay	Graham Greene	Won	
New York Film Critics Circle	Best Director	Carol Reed	Won	
New York Film Critics Circle	Best Film	The Fallen Idol	Nominated	
New York Film Critics Circle	Best Actor	Ralph Richardson	Nominated	
Venice International Film Festival	Best Screenplay	Graham Greene	Won	
Venice International Film Festival	Grand International Award	Carol Reed	Nominated	

=== Home media ===
The Criterion Collection released the film on DVD on 7 November 2006. This DVD went out of print in 2010. In 2015, StudioCanal released a region B Blu-ray edition.

== Sources ==
- Hammer, Tad Bantley (1991). International Film Prizes: An Encyclopedia. Chicago, Illinois: St. James Press. OCLC 489910723.
- Vermilye, Jerry (1978). The Great British Films. New York City, New York: Citadel Press. pp. 125–177. ISBN 0-8065-0661-X.
