= The End of the Party (short story) =

1929 short story by Graham Greene

- Short story by Graham Greene
- Country: United Kingdom
- Language: English
- Genre: Short story

Publication
- Published in: London Mercury
- Media type: Print (newspaper)
- Publication date: January 1932

"The End of the Party" is a short story by the English writer Graham Greene (1904–1991). It was written in 1929, first published in 1932 in the London Mercury, and has been reprinted many times in anthologies. It is viewed as a classical expression of the English tradition of horror fiction, as it elicits a well-founded and increasingly intense sense of impending doom without inserting any scenes of physical violence.

== Plot summary ==
The two principal protagonists of "The End of the Party" are nine-year-olds, Peter Morton and Francis Morton. The story makes clear that although they are identical twins, they possess profound psychological differences – Peter, the elder by several minutes, is presented as a healthy child with an intensively protective attitude towards his impaired brother, while Francis is depicted as being challenged by an intense anxiety disorder. The unnamed narrator speculates that Francis suffered psychological trauma when he was briefly separated from Peter during the birth process.

Peter and Francis will be separated again during a game of hide-and-seek that is the scheduled climax of a birthday party for a family acquaintance, ten-year-old Colin Henne-Falcon. Descriptions of the home of the Mortons, where the story begins, and the Henne-Falcons, where it ends, make clear that the ambiance of the story is that of the English upper class between the two World Wars. The brief appearance of a child's nurse, and other servants, help establish the social setting. Cozy elements such as an egg-and-spoon race, a three-legged race, and a birthday cake do little to diminish the mounting horror of the story, as Francis is increasingly terrified by the prospect of being required to play hide-and-seek in the dark.

As the climactic hide-and-seek game begins, the adults present turn out the lights, and the children designated to hide, including Peter and Francis, are required to scatter. Peter senses his brother's terror and, aided by his instinctive grasp of his brother's psychological fears and needs, is able to guess where Francis has hidden. A gesture of Peter's hand in the dark, as he reaches out, tells him that his guess has been successful: he touches his younger brother and then grasps his hand and crouches close to him, attempting to provide a continuing presence of reassurance. Faint noises, described meticulously by Greene, show that the game is continuing, and darkness continues to enshroud the place of safety where the two brothers are hiding.

Finally, the game is over, a chandelier is lit, and the party's hostess begins to scream with horror. As light floods into the niche where the brothers have hidden themselves, the narrator reports that Francis Morton has lain sprawled and still since the terrified child was startled beyond endurance by the touch of a human hand in the dark. The story's ironic ending makes clear that the nine-year-old did not live long enough to realize that the fingers descending upon his face were those of his protective brother. Their separation would now be permanent.

== Critical response ==
Greene published "The End of the Party" near the start of a writing career that would extend over more than six decades. The story was anthologized in the Greene collection, Twenty-One Stories, published in 1954.

Greene himself considered this story to be among his best, and assisted in its selection among the texts reprinted in the Greene edition of the Viking Portable Library, originally published in 1973 and reprinted since in revised editions.

A review published in 1999 by New York University encourages readers to develop a sense of empathy for the doomed child.
