= The Human Factor (novel) =

1978 novel by Graham Greene

- First Edition Cover
- Author: Graham Greene
- Language: English
- Genre: Novel
- Published: 1978
- Publisher: The Bodley Head
- Publication place: United Kingdom
- Media type: Print (Hardback & Paperback)
- Pages: 344 pp (first edition, hardback)
- ISBN: 0-370-30043-2 (first edition, hardback)
- OCLC: 3741600
- Dewey Decimal: 823/.9/12
- LC Class: PZ3.G8319 Hu PR6013.R44
- Preceded by: The Honorary Consul
- Followed by: Doctor Fischer of Geneva or The Bomb Party

The Human Factor is an espionage novel by Graham Greene, first published in 1978 and adapted into the 1979 film The Human Factor, directed by Otto Preminger using a screenplay by Tom Stoppard.

== Plot summary ==
Maurice Castle is an aging bureaucrat in the British MI6 secret service. Married to a black South African woman with whom he fell in love during his previous stint in apartheid South Africa, he now lives a quiet life in the suburbs and looks forward to retirement. As the book begins, a leak has been traced to the African section in London where he works and threatens to disrupt this precarious tranquility. Castle and younger colleague Davis make light of the resulting inquiry, but when Davis is accused on circumstantial evidence and quietly "disposed of", Castle begins to wrestle with questions of loyalty, morality and conscience. On the one hand, Castle undertakes his day-to-day job professionally, and is willing to do what is more than required for both Davis and Daintry, his boss. On the other hand, Castle is grateful to Carson, who, as a Communist, helped Castle's wife escape South Africa. In return, Castle decides to help the Communists and believes that by helping them, he is helping his wife's people—not knowing that the Soviets have all along been using him for entirely different purposes.

The novel ends with a bleak portrayal of life in Moscow for defectors who were feted but at the same time suffered the shortages, shoddy furnishings and underwhelming work shared by Soviets. The disappointment is sharp for Castle, who never had an investment in Communism and whose actions severed him from the two people he loved.

The novel builds its suspense by focusing on the psychological burdens of the pawns in the game, particularly frustration with the culture of secrecy in the three secret services—British, Soviet and South African—and with the sophisticated amorality of the men at the top. Greene's characters are complete psychological portraits located within the context of the Cold War and the impact of international affairs on the complicated lives of individuals and vice versa. The interplay of international politics and personal dissent is a trademark of this author.

== Major themes ==
In his 1980 autobiography Ways of Escape, Greene wrote that his aim with this book was "to write a novel of espionage free from the conventional violence, which has not, in spite of James Bond, been a feature of the British Secret Service. "I wanted to present the Service unromantically as a way of life, men going daily to their office to earn their pensions." Writing in his 70s, Greene drew on his own experience in MI6 and explored the moral ambiguities raised by his old boss, legendary Soviet double agent Kim Philby, although Greene stated that Castle, the main character in the novel, was not based on Philby.

Another theme Greene explored was what he considered the hypocrisy of the West's relations with South Africa under apartheid. He thought that even though the West publicly opposed apartheid, "they simply could not let South Africa succumb to black power and Communism" (from the Introduction to the 1982 edition of The Human Factor).
