= Our Man in Havana =

1958 novel by Graham Greene

- First edition
- Author: Graham Greene
- Language: English
- Genre: Novel
- Published: 24 October 1958
- Publisher: Heinemann
- Publication place: United Kingdom
- Media type: Print (hardcover)
- Pages: 273
- Followed by: A Burnt-Out Case

Our Man in Havana (1958) is a novel set in Cuba by the English author Graham Greene. Greene uses the novel to mock intelligence services, especially the British MI6, and their willingness to believe reports from their local informants.

The novel was adapted into a film of the same name in 1959, directed by Carol Reed and starring Alec Guinness. In 1963, it was adapted into an opera by Malcolm Williamson to a libretto by Sidney Gilliat, who had worked on the film. In 2007, it was adapted into a play by Clive Francis, which has toured the UK several times and been performed in various parts of the world.

== Background ==
Greene joined MI6 in August 1941. In London, Greene had been appointed to the subsection dealing with counter-espionage in the Iberian Peninsula, where he had learnt about German agents in Portugal relaying fictitious reports to their superiors, which garnered them expenses and bonuses to add to their basic salary.

One of the agents was "Garbo", a Spanish double agent in Lisbon, who gave his German handlers disinformation, by pretending to control a ring of agents all over England. In fact, he invented armed forces movements and operations from maps, guides and standard military references. Garbo was the main inspiration for Wormold, the protagonist of Our Man in Havana.

Remembering the German agents in Portugal, Greene wrote the first version of the story in 1946, as an outline for a film script, with the story set in Estonia in 1938. The film was never made, and Greene soon realised that Havana, which he had visited several times in the early 1950s, would be a much better setting, with the absurdities of the Cold War being more appropriate for a comedy.

== Plot ==
The novel, a black comedy, is set in Havana during the Fulgencio Batista regime. James Wormold, a vacuum cleaner retailer, is approached by Hawthorne, who tries to recruit him for the Secret Intelligence Service (MI6). Wormold's wife had left him and now he lives with his beautiful 17-year-old daughter Milly, who is devoutly Catholic, but also headstrong and demanding. Since Wormold does not make enough money to pay for Milly's extravagances, he accepts the offer of a side job in espionage. Because he has no information to send to London, Wormold fabricates his reports using information found in newspapers and invents a fictitious network of agents. Some of the names in his network are those of real people (most of whom he has never met), but some are made up. Wormold tells only his friend and World War I veteran, Dr. Hasselbacher, about his spy work, hiding the truth from Milly.

He decides to make his reports "exciting" by sending to London sketches of what he describes as a secret military installation in the mountains, actually vacuum cleaner parts scaled to a large size. In London, nobody except Hawthorne, the only one to know that Wormold sells vacuum cleaners, doubts this report. However, Hawthorne keeps quiet for fear of losing his job. In the light of the new developments, London sends Wormold a secretary, Beatrice Severn, and a radio assistant codenamed "C" with much spy paraphernalia.

On arriving, Beatrice tells Wormold she has orders to take over his contacts. Her first request is to contact the pilot Raúl. Under pressure, Wormold develops an elaborate plan for his fictitious agent "Raúl". However, to his surprise, a real person with the same name is killed in an apparent car accident. From then on, Wormold's manufactured universe overlaps with reality, with threats made to his "contacts". Together, Beatrice, who still believes the contacts to be real, and Wormold try to save the real people who share names with his fictional agents.

Meanwhile, London passes on the information that an unspecified enemy, implied to be a Soviet contact, intends to poison Wormold at a trade association luncheon, where he is the speaker. It would seem that his information has worried local operatives who now seek to remove him. London is pleased by this, as that validates his work. Wormold goes to the function and sees Dr. Hasselbacher, who loudly warns him of the threat. Wormold continues to the dinner where he manages to refuse the meal that is offered and eats another one. Across the table sits a fellow vacuum cleaner salesman he had met earlier, Carter, who offers him whisky. Suspicious, Wormold knocks over the glass, which is then drunk by the headwaiter's dachshund, which soon dies. In retaliation for the failure, Carter kills Dr. Hasselbacher.

Captain Segura, a military strongman in love with Milly and intending to marry her, has a list of all of the spies in Havana, which Wormold would like to send to London to partially redeem his employment. He tells Segura that he is going to his house to discuss Segura's plans about Milly. Once there, Wormold proposes they play a game of draughts using miniature bottles of Scotch and bourbon as the game pieces, where each piece taken has to be drunk at once. Eventually, Segura, who is a much better player, ends up drunk and falls asleep. Wormold takes his gun and photographs the list using a microdot camera. To avenge the murder of Dr. Hasselbacher, Wormold convinces Carter to accompany him on a drive and, at a local brothel and after some hesitation, shoots him with Segura's pistol. He misses Carter and is about to leave. Carter shoots back, but Wormold shoots and kills him. Wormold sends the agent list as a microdot photograph on a postage stamp to London, but it proves blank when processed.

Wormold confesses everything to Beatrice, who surprisingly admires his doings. Captain Segura then gets Wormold deported from Cuba by reporting him to London. Wormold and Beatrice are summoned to headquarters, where Beatrice is posted to Jakarta and Wormold's situation is considered. To avoid embarrassment and silence him from speaking to the press, MI6 offers Wormold a teaching post at headquarters and recommends him for the Order of the British Empire. Afterwards, Beatrice comes to Wormold's hotel, and they decide to marry. Milly is surprisingly accepting of their decision, and she is to go to a Swiss finishing school, paid for by Wormold's scam earnings.

== Cuba's attitude ==
The revolutionary government of Cuba allowed the film version of Our Man in Havana to be filmed in the Cuban capital, but Fidel Castro complained that the novel did not accurately portray the brutality of the Batista regime.

In his autobiography, Ways of Escape, Greene commented:

Alas, the book did me little good with the new rulers in Havana. In poking fun at the British Secret Service, I had minimized the terror of Batista's rule. I had not wanted too black a background for a light-hearted comedy, but those who suffered during the years of dictatorship could hardly be expected to appreciate that my real subject was the absurdity of the British agent and not the justice of a revolution.

Greene returned to Havana between 1963 and 1966.
