= In Search of a Character =

1961 travel journal by Graham Greene

- First edition
- Author: Graham Greene
- Language: English
- Publisher: The Bodley Head
- Publication date: 1961
- Publication place: United Kingdom
- Media type: Print (hardback & paperback)

In Search of a Character: Two African Journals is a slim volume, part travel book, part novelist’s journal, written by English author Graham Greene and first published in 1961. Greene set two of his novels in Africa; A Burnt-Out Case, set in the Belgian Congo, and The Heart of the Matter, set in Sierra Leone. This book contains the journals, not originally intended for publication, that he kept on journeys he made for research purposes before writing those two novels.

The first part, "Convoy to West Africa", covers Greene's journey to Sierra Leone in 1941. The second part, "Congo Journal", mainly deals with his journey to the Belgian Congo in 1959 and the people he meets along the way. He made the latter trip with the story of his 1960 novel A Burnt-Out Case already partly written, and it is apparent he is searching for characters to populate that story. Greene fans often find this work interesting as a glimpse into the mind of the writer and of the man.
