= Dangerous Edge: A Life of Graham Greene =

2012 documentary film directed by Thomas Patrick O'Connor

- Written by: Thomas Patrick O'Connor
- Directed by: Thomas Patrick O'Connor
- Starring: Graham Greene, Bill Nighy
- Narrated by: Derek Jacobi
- Country of origin: United States

Production
- Producer: Thomas Patrick O'Connor

Original release
- Network: PBS
- Release: March 29, 2013

Dangerous Edge: A Life of Graham Greene is a biographical documentary film about Graham Greene, originally broadcast nationally in the US on PBS on March 29, 2013 and distributed internationally. It was directed by Thomas Patrick O'Connor and narrated by Derek Jacobi. Contributors and cast include Graham Greene himself, his wife Vivien Greene, Bernard Diederich, John le Carré, David Lodge, John Mortimer, Bill Nighy, John Perkins, Paul Theroux and biographers Richard Greene (no relation) and Norman Sherry.
