= Henry Walston, Baron Walston =

British politician and baron (1912-1991)

The Right Honourable The Lord Walston CVO

Member of the House of Lords Lord Temporal
- In office 10 February 1961 – 29 May 1991; Life Peerage

Personal details
- Born: 16 June 1912
- Died: 29 May 1991 (aged 78)
- Party: Liberal (until c. 1945); Labour (c. 1945–81); SDP (1981–88) 'Continuing' SDP (1988–90)
- Spouses: Catherine Crompton (m. 1935; died 1978); Elizabeth Scott (m. 1979)
- Children: 6
- Education: King's College, Cambridge

Henry David Leonard George Walston, Baron Walston CVO, JP (16 June 1912 – 29 May 1991) was a British farmer, agricultural researcher and politician, firstly for the Liberal Party, then for Labour and for the Social Democratic Party.

== Life ==
Walston was born in 1912 to Sir Charles Waldstein (later Walston) and his wife Florence (née Einstein), and was educated at Eton College and King's College, Cambridge. The scion of a wealthy German-American family, he was originally expected to follow his father, a Cambridge don and renowned archaeologist, into academic life, and upon receiving his degree he spent two years at Harvard University as a research fellow in bacteriology. Ultimately, however, he chose to return to England, cultivating his estate in Thriplow, Cambridgeshire (2700 acres), and purchasing land further afield in St Lucia (3000 acres).

During the Second World War, because of his experience in dealing with agrarian issues, Walston was appointed a Member of the Huntingdonshire War Agricultural Committee (1939–45). Following the war's end he became the Director of Agriculture for the British Zone of Germany (1946–47), and upon returning to Britain he was Agricultural Adviser for Germany to the Foreign Office (1947–48) and counsellor to the Duchy of Lancaster (1948–54). At around this time he was also a Governor of Guy's Hospital and, by the 1960s, was a Deputy Chairman and then Vice-President of the Royal Commonwealth Society, which he addressed in 1963. From 1959 to 1964 he was a Trustee of the Rural Industries Bureau.

== In politics ==
In the early 1940s Walston was selected as Liberal prospective parliamentary candidate for King's Lynn. In 1945 his booklet From Forces to Farming was published by the Liberal Party. The booklet called for state aided co-operative farming for ex-servicemen. He did not contest King's Lynn, instead switching to contest Huntingdonshire later that year at the general election. He never managed to become a member of parliament despite contesting seats five times: Huntingdonshire in 1945 for the Liberals; Cambridgeshire in 1951 and 1955 for Labour; and Gainsborough in the 1956 by-election and in 1959, again for Labour.

A supporter of Hugh Gaitskell, Walston joined the Campaign for Democratic Socialism (CDS) at its foundation in 1960, and was among the circle of wealthy Labour supporters (the hotelier Charles Forte and supermarket owner Alan Sainsbury were others) who bankrolled its operations. He, Forte and Sainsbury had already been responsible for funding the relaunched, London-based version of the socialist newspaper Forward in the late 1950s.

=== Junior minister ===
Walston served in the First Wilson ministry, as Under-Secretary of State for Foreign Affairs from 20 October 1964 to the beginning of 1967.

In internal Foreign Office discussion, Walston supported James Cable's line, that the USA should cut its losses in the Vietnam War, and argued that the UK should have a pro-active policy of seeking peace. By the second half of 1965 Walston was in fact pushing this line harder than Cable himself. In June 1966 Walston was passing through South Vietnam on an envoy mission, when he was contacted by Janusz Lewandowski, who said he was acting for the Polish government and attempting to find peace in the Vietnam War. Walston, however, treated this as a freelance approach.

Following Rhodesia's Unilateral Declaration of Independence (UDI) Walston was envoy to Portugal, attempting to negotiate an end to sanction-breaking pumping of oil to Southern Rhodesia via Beira, Mozambique. His diplomacy was overtaken by Security Council resolution 221 of 9 April 1966. As a Foreign Office junior minister, Walston argued that the UK government should not grant Rhodesian independence except on terms of majority rule. While Rhodesia was the responsibility of the Commonwealth Relations Office, he maintained that UDI had increased the chances of communist penetration in Africa and that this was a proper concern of the Foreign Office.

During this time at the Foreign Office, Walston was a trustee of one of John Collins's secret Christian Action trusts, channelling funds to the African National Congress. He expressed very positive feelings about Fidel Castro. Walston was then Parliamentary Secretary to the Board of Trade, in 1967.

=== Later political life ===
On a lecture tour of South Africa in 1968, Walston had private discussions with B. J. Vorster, and as a consequence attempted to open a channel of communication to Kenneth Kaunda. He also visited Nelson Mandela on Robben Island, concluding that he was being well treated by his gaolers. During this period the South African government wished to broker a deal between the UK and Ian Smith, and to use Walston's contacts. That same year, he became Chairman of the Institute of Race Relations, remaining in post until 1971.

Walston was a member of the Council of Europe between 1970 and 1975, and a Member of the European Parliament from 1975 to 1977. In the period from 1970 to 1976 several Labour politicians met at his apartment in The Albany, eventually forming a retrospectively-christened "Walston group" of pro-European MPs who were supportive of the leading right-wing figure in the party, Roy Jenkins.

Along with most members of that group, Walston joined the Social Democratic Party (SDP) upon its foundation in 1981. He was the SDP spokesperson on agriculture and foreign affairs in the House of Lords from 1983 onwards. Unusually for an associate of Jenkins, however, he chose not to support the SDP's merger with the Liberals in 1988, despite his former association with that party; instead he followed David Owen into the newly formed 'continuing' SDP, becoming its first chief whip in the Lords. Walston also became active during this time with the UN-accredited non-governmental organisation Agri-Energy Roundtable, and served as its vice-chairman for several years.

== Pamphlets ==
Walston published political pamphlets on agricultural topics:

- From Forces to Farming. A Plan for the Ex-Service Man (1944), Liberal Party Publication Department; as prospective Liberal Party candidate for King's Lynn.
- Land Nationalisation: For and Against (1958), Fabian Society Issue 312. With John Mackie.
- The Farmer and Europe (1962), Fabian Society. On planning for farming if the UK joined the Common Market.
- Agriculture under Communism (1962).
- Farm Gate to Brussels (1970), Fabian Society.
- Dealing with Hunger (1976).

== Honours ==
On 10 February 1961 he was created a life peer as Baron Walston, of Newton in the County of Cambridge. He was appointed a Commander of the Royal Victorian Order (CVO) in 1976 New Year Honours.

== Family ==
Walston married Catherine Crompton (1916–1978) in 1935, in the USA. Oliver Walston, a farmer and agricultural writer, was their second son, whilst their youngest, James, was an academic and specialist in contemporary Italian politics. From 1946 Catherine was the mistress of the author Graham Greene, who was also her godfather. Walston demanded that the adulterous relationship cease after the 1951 publication of The End of the Affair, Greene's roman à clef, but it continued, ending by about 1966. After Catherine's death, Walston married Elizabeth Scott, who had previously been the wife of Conservative MP Nicholas Scott.

Press reports that Betty Boothroyd, who acted as Walston's secretary before herself entering politics, had been his mistress and also cared for his six children by Catherine, were the subject of a successful libel case brought by Boothroyd.

== Arms ==
Coat of arms of Henry Walston, Baron Walston
Crest Upon a rock an oak tree Proper between two wings Azure. Escutcheon Quarterly Or and Azure in chief two lions combatant and in base two similar lions counterchanged within a bordure Ermine. Supporters Dexter a farm labourer supporting by the exterior hand a sheaf of barley sinister a West Indian supporting likewise a stalk of bananas all Proper. Motto Wachstum und Stetigkeit (Growth and Continuity)

== See also ==
- Vivien Greene
