= Confidential Agent =

1945 film by Herman Shumlin

- Theatrical release poster
- Directed by: Herman Shumlin
- Screenplay by: Robert Buckner
- Based on: Confidential Agent; 1939 novel by Graham Greene
- Produced by: Robert Buckner
- Starring: Charles Boyer; Lauren Bacall; Katina Paxinou; Peter Lorre
- Cinematography: James Wong Howe
- Edited by: George Amy
- Music by: Franz Waxman
- Distributed by: Warner Bros. Pictures
- Release date: November 2, 1945 (United States)
- Running time: 118 minutes
- Country: United States
- Language: English

Confidential Agent is a 1945 American spy film starring Charles Boyer and Lauren Bacall which was a Warner Brothers production. The movie was directed by Herman Shumlin and produced by Robert Buckner, with Jack L. Warner as executive producer. The screenplay was by Robert Buckner, based on the 1939 novel The Confidential Agent by Graham Greene. The music score was by Franz Waxman and the cinematographer was James Wong Howe. The supporting cast included George Coulouris and Peter Lorre.

== Plot ==
In the midst of the Spanish Civil War, Luis Denard (Charles Boyer), a former concert pianist and composer, travels to England as a confidential agent of the Republican government. His mission is to buy coal or to deny it to the Fascist rebels. On the ship, he meets bored rich girl Rose Cullen (Lauren Bacall), whose father, Lord Benditch (Holmes Herbert), heads the firm with which Denard will negotiate.

On the road to London, he is beaten and robbed by Fascist agents, who do not find the documents he hid in his shoe. At his hotel he enlists the aid of the young maid, Else (Wanda Hendrix), who hides his documents in her stocking. When he meets his contacts, Contreras (Peter Lorre) and Maria Melandez (Katina Paxinou), he finds they have sold out to the Fascists and want him discredited or killed. They kill the maid, for which Denard takes revenge. Contreras dies of a heart attack as Denard prepares to shoot him, after which Mrs. Melandez takes poison.

Unable to buy any coal, Denard tries to persuade the miners to support their fellow workers in Spain, but they put work ahead of principle. His mission a failure, Rose gets an admirer to help him leave the country secretly. Reaching the coast at Bexhill-on-Sea, he learns that Benditch's firm have repudiated their contract with the Fascists, so he has succeeded after all. On the ship, he finds Rose, to whose life he has given meaning.

== Cast ==
- Charles Boyer as Luis Denard
- Lauren Bacall as Rose Cullen
- Katina Paxinou as Mrs. Melandez
- Victor Francen as Licata
- Wanda Hendrix as Else
- George Coulouris as Captain Currie
- Peter Lorre as Contreras
- John Warburton as Neil Forbes
- Holmes Herbert as Lord Benditch
- Dan Seymour as Mr. Muckerji
- Art Foster as Chauffeur
- Miles Mander as Mr. Brigstock
- Lawrence Grant as Lord Fetting
- Ian Wolfe as Dr. Bellows
- George Zucco as Detective Geddes
- Gordon Richards as Immigration Officer (uncredited)
- Marie De Becker as Miner's Wife (uncredited)
- John Goldsworthy as Beggar (uncredited)

== Production ==
The screenplay was based on a Graham Greene novel of the same name. There is evidence of jump cuts, which suggest that some crude editing was done to get the running time under two hours. Though regarded as overly long, the film remains true to Greene's original story.

== Reception ==
=== Critical response ===
According to "The Big Sleep Comparisons 1945/46", a featurette on the 2000 DVD release of Bacall's film The Big Sleep, her reviews for Confidential Agent, her second movie role, were largely negative, with particular aspersions cast on her performance as a "jaded industrial heiress".

According to film historian Robert Gitt, host of the featurette, Warner studio head Jack L. Warner was lobbied to have certain scenes in The Big Sleep re-shot, to rectify performance problems with Bacall identified in Confidential Agent, which he did. In her own autobiography, Bacall said that she begged not to have to do the film, but couldn't break her contract that early.

In The Nation in 1945, critic James Agee wrote, "Confidential Agent is a surprisingly serious translation of Graham Greene's thriller ... this is in some ways an exciting and good picture, the best attempt yet, though still inadequate, to make the most of a Greene novel. Charles Boyer, imaginatively cast, gives the agent a proper balance of incongruous frailty, incompetence, tragic responsibility, and moral courage; Lauren Bacall is still amateurish and she is about as English as Pocahontas, but her very individual vitality more than make up for her deficiencies."

=== Graham Greene's response ===
Greene, generally critical of film adaptations of his works, disagreed with the critics. In 1979, when Philip Purser returned to the question of the casting of Bacall in The Sunday Telegraph, Greene commended the acting of both Bacall and Boyer. He also praised Shumlin as the only American director to make a good film from one of his stories. In a letter to The Sunday Telegraph, titled "An Honourable Performance", Greene wrote:

Mr Philip Purser writes that Lauren Bacall was 'insanely miscast in her third picture The [sic] Confidential Agent and having given—as she admits—a lousy performance, she nevertheless bitterly resented the cool notices that came her way'. I also as the author of the book resent those cool notices. This remains the only good film ever made from one of my books by an American director and Miss Bacall gave an admirable performance and so did Charles Boyer.
