= Journey Without Maps =

1936 travel account by Graham Greene

- Author: Graham Greene
- Genre: Travel book
- Publisher: Heinemann
- Publication date: 1936
- Publication place: United Kingdom

Journey Without Maps (1936) is a travel account by Graham Greene of a 350-mile (560 km), 4-week walk through the interior of Liberia in 1935. It was Greene's first trip outside Europe. He hoped to leave civilization and find the "heart of darkness" in Africa. The interior of Liberia was at the time poorly mapped (an American government map had the interior as a large white space marked "cannibals"), and so he relied on local guides and porters.

In the first volume of his autobiography, A Sort of Life, Greene wrote that he was unsure if he would have travelled to Liberia if he had not read H. Rider Haggard, an English author of adventure fiction set in Africa and other exotic locales. Greene said his decision to go to Liberia was "foolhardy" and the journey itself "absurd and reckless," "a kind of Russian Roulette." He did not travel lightly, hiring 25 porters in Sierra Leone to accompany him. He also brought along six boxes of food, two beds and chairs, mosquito nets, three suitcases, a tent, two boxes of "miscellaneous things," a bath, a bundle of blankets, a folding table, a money box, a hammock, and an unspecified number of cases of whisky. Looking over his supplies at the start of the journey, Greene admitted to feeling "a little shamed by my servants, who each brought with them a small flat suitcase."

Greene set off from the northernmost point of the country bordering Sierra Leone near the town of Kailahun (near Pendembu) and travelled in a south-easterly direction through the jungle highlands. He crossed through a section of French Guinea, going between the Liberian towns of Zorzor and Ganta, before turning south-west and arriving at the coast at Grand Bassa. He then travelled by sea to Monrovia. Near the end of his life, he would write that in Liberia "I had lost my heart to West Africa." He said he "never wearied of the villages" where he stopped each night, but during the daily hike through the forest "the senses were dulled and registered only acute boredom."

Greene's account provides insights into Liberia in 1935. In addition to the inhabitants, Greene encountered American and English missionaries, a German adventurer, an American doctor, and a gold prospector. Most of the villages he passed through had encountered whites before, but it had been years earlier. Greene documents the deplorable public health – there were only a handful of doctors in the whole country. Diseases that ravaged Liberians included yellow fever, malaria, venereal disease, and leprosy. Greene drank whisky throughout the trip, going through cases of it. He became ill halfway through the journey, during their stay at Zigiter, and almost died while in Zigi's Town, near the end of the trip. During this experience he discovered that he had a "passionate interest in living" which "seemed that night an important discovery". The trip also shaped his future writing career.

Greene travelled with his cousin, Barbara Greene, who in 1938 produced her own memoir of the trip, Land Benighted (republished in 1981 as Too Late to Turn Back). How well the two accounts match up appears to be a matter of opinion. In Paul Theroux's introduction to the 1981 version of Barbara's book, he says "Few journeys have been so well recorded, and there are few discrepancies and no contradictions between the two accounts". However, in Michael Shapiro's 2004 book A Sense of Place: Great Travel Writers Talk about Their Craft, Lives, and Inspiration, he records Jonathan Raban saying Barbara's memoir "contradicts Greene's memoir on almost every point.. neither narrator agrees with the one other as to anything at all, where they were, who they saw, what they met, the condition of his illness, whatever. There is just no consonance between these two accounts".

A doctor in Freetown, Sierra Leone, P.D. Oakley, sued the publisher, Heinemann, after the book's publication, saying Greene's depiction of a character in the book, called Pa Oakley, also a doctor, was libellous. The publisher withdrew the book from circulation and pulped the remaining copies. The book was not reprinted until after Greene obtained publication rights in 1946.

In 2009 the English writer and journalist Tim Butcher retraced Greene's journey, accompanied by fellow Englishman and Graham Greene aficionado David Poraj-Wilczynski. Butcher's account of their adventure was published as Chasing the Devil in 2010 by Random House.
