= The Honorary Consul (film) =

1983 British film by John Mackenzie based on the 1973 novel

- Theatrical release poster
- Directed by: John Mackenzie
- Screenplay by: Christopher Hampton
- Based on: The Honorary Consul by Graham Greene
- Produced by: Norma Heyman
- Starring: Michael Caine; Richard Gere; Bob Hoskins; Elpidia Carrillo
- Cinematography: Phil Méheux
- Edited by: Stuart Baird
- Music by: Stanley Myers
- Distributed by: Fox-Rank
- Release date: 30 September 1983
- Running time: 103 minutes
- Country: United Kingdom
- Language: English
- Budget: $11.8 million
- Box office: $5,997,566

The Honorary Consul (released in the US as Beyond The Limit) is a 1983 British drama film directed by John Mackenzie, and starring Michael Caine, Richard Gere, Bob Hoskins and Elpidia Carrillo. It is based on the 1973 novel The Honorary Consul by Graham Greene.

== Plot summary ==
The story is set in Corrientes, a small town in north east Argentina. Eduardo Plarr is a doctor of Paraguayan and British parentage. As a boy, he was forced to flee his native Paraguay after the arrest and subsequent disappearance of his father, a dissident. Plarr makes the acquaintance of the dissolute and heavy-drinking Charley Fortnum, the honorary British consul. He also meets Colonel Perez, the local police chief.

While attending patients in a shanty town, Plarr meets Leon, an old school friend from Paraguay. Leon was ordained as a priest but left the priesthood to get married. He is now involved in a group of militant activists.

Fortnum asks Plarr to come to his house to attend to his wife, who is complaining of stomach cramps. Plarr recognises the wife as Clara, a girl who previously worked at the town's brothel. Plarr later meets Clara while she is out shopping. They begin a passionate affair.

Leon visits Plarr in his surgery, along with Aquino, another activist. The two men try to persuade Plarr to help in a plot to kidnap the American ambassador, who is due to visit the district, and to exchange him for political prisoners held in Paraguay. Plarr initially refuses, but reluctantly agrees when Leon tells him that his father is one of the prisoners. Plarr gives Leon details of the ambassador's itinerary which he obtains from Fortnum. He also gives him some morphine to be used to pacify the ambassador.

The kidnapping is planned for the day of the ambassador's visit to a nearby waterfall. His party sets out in two cars, with Fortnum driving the first car, the ambassador in the passenger seat. The rest of the party follows in a second car. The kidnappers' first attempt to intercept the cars fails when they get held up by a military convoy. A second, apparently successful, attempt is made on the return journey.

Later, Plarr receives a phone call from Leon, who is afraid that the ambassador has fallen into a coma after receiving a morphine overdose. Plarr goes to a shack in the shanty town where the group is holding the ambassador. He determines that the patient is in no danger from the morphine, but informs Leon that the person they kidnapped is not the American ambassador: he is Fortnum, the British consul. While at the waterfall, the ambassador, shocked by Fortnum's reckless driving and heavy drinking, had insisted that they change places for the return journey; the ambassador took the wheel with the consul in the passenger seat, hence the wrong person being kidnapped.

Despite Plarr warning the dissidents that Fortnum has no value to the authorities, the group proceed with their demand for the release of ten political prisoners. Plarr travels to Buenos Aires in an unsuccessful attempt to persuade the British ambassador to intervene. On his return, Plarr learns from Perez that his father has been killed a year earlier when trying to escape.

Plarr is again summoned to the shack, this time to treat Fortnum for a gunshot wound sustained while trying to flee from a latrine. Plarr is furious with Leon for misleading him over his father's death. Fortnum overhears Plarr telling Leon of his adultery with Clara and saying that he, not Fortnum, is the father of the child that Clara is expecting.

Meanwhile, police and soldiers arrive at the shanty town and surround the shack. Plarr leaves the shack in an attempt to negotiate with Perez, but is shot down. The soldiers then storm the shack, killing all the occupants except Fortnum. On his return home, Fortnum and Clara are reconciled. He accepts the fact that he is not the father of the baby, and even suggests naming the child Eduardo, after Plarr.

== Cast ==
- Michael Caine as Charley Fortnum
- Richard Gere as Eduardo Plarr
- Bob Hoskins as Colonel Perez
- Elpidia Carrillo as Clara Fortnum
- Joaquim de Almeida as Leon
- A Martinez as Aquino
- Geoffrey Palmer as the British Ambassador
- Leonard Maguire as Dr. Humphries
- Ramón Alvarez as father of Eduardo Plarr

== Production ==
The film was produced by Norma Heyman, the first British woman to produce a solo independent feature film.

The movie was filmed on location in Veracruz, Mexico and Mexico City, and at the Shepperton Studios in Surrey, England.

== Release and reception ==
The film grossed $5.998 million at the U.S. box office. It received mixed reviews. Audiences polled by CinemaScore gave the film an average grade of "D" on an A+ to F scale.

The staff of Variety wrote that "strong talents on both sides of the camera haven’t managed to breathe life into this intricate tale of emotional and political betrayal and [the] result is a steady dose of tedium." Vincent Canby of The New York Times wrote of "the grossly meaningless title that has been attached—like a bathtub to a car—to the screen adaptation of The Honorary Consul, Mr. Greene's 1973 novel", (Note: According to star Michael Caine, "They thought nobody in America would know what an honorary consul was".) and praised some of the performances and the location shooting, yet remarked that "With the best of intentions and no little talent, John Mackenzie, the director, and Christopher Hampton, the writer, have made a movie that in some respects becomes an unkind criticism of the novel. The Honorary Consul is a much more complicated, mysterious work than one might suspect from this rather literal if quite faithful condensation."

Greene himself disowned the film, saying, "I don't want to see Richard Gere undressing." He felt that the actor "was completely and utterly miscast". Greene's friend Peter Duffell, whose England Made Me (1973) was one of the few adaptations of his novels the author approved of, produced a script that he liked and which he hoped Duffell could direct, but the final film "was in the hands of a producer and a scriptwriter who didn't see eye to eye with me".
