= The Confidential Agent =

1939 novel by Graham Greene

- First edition (UK)
- Author: Graham Greene
- Language: English
- Genre: Thriller novel
- Publisher: William Heinemann (UK); Viking Press (US)
- Publication date: 1939
- Publication place: United Kingdom
- Media type: Print (hardback and paperback)

The Confidential Agent (1939) is a thriller novel by British author Graham Greene. Fuelled by Benzedrine, Greene wrote it in six weeks. To avoid distraction, he rented a room in Bloomsbury from a landlady who lived in a flat below him. He used that apartment in the novel (it is where D. hides for a day) and had an affair with the landlady's daughter. He wrote the book for money and was so displeased with his work that he wanted it published under a pseudonym. But critics took a far different view; The New York Times, for example, called the novel "a magnificent tour-de-force".

== Plot summary ==
D, a former university professor from the Continent who speaks English, is sent by his government, two years into a vicious civil war, on a secret mission to buy coal in England. Traumatised by the war, in which his wife was executed in error and he was buried alive in an air raid, England to him is a place of peace and happy memories.

On the ferry he sees L, an aristocratic supporter of the right-wing rebels, and Rose, a bold and wilful English girl. Waiting for the train to London, Rose tells D she is the estranged daughter of Lord Benditch, the mineowner whom D has come to negotiate with. Impatient, she hires a car and offers D a lift, but when they stop at a hotel a man in the washroom tries to rob D. Deciding to drive on alone, he is followed by L, whose chauffeur beats him up and leaves him by the roadside. They do not find the government documents D had hidden in his shoe.

Hitching a lift to London, D follows instructions by booking into a seedy hotel, where he befriends the 14-year-old maid Else and persuades her to hide his documents in her stocking. Then he goes to meet his contact K, who works at a language school teaching an invented language called Entrenationo (obviously modelled on Esperanto). Back at his hotel, Rose rings and asks him to meet her, but on his way a bullet misses him. When Rose returns to the spot with him, she finds the bullet and realises he is in mortal danger. Telling her about his work before the war as one of the world's leading experts on the Chanson de Roland, he becomes closer to her.

Retrieving his documents from Else next day, he goes to see Lord Benditch and his fellow directors, one of whom is Forbes, informally engaged to Rose. They are ready to do a deal and ask for his documents, which he discovers have been lifted from him on the way in by Benditch's butler. Dismissed, on his way out he sees L going in to talk to the mineowners.

Rose comes in and gets Forbes to come with her to D's embassy, where she thinks he will be authenticated. The official they see, a supporter of the rebels, claims that D is dead, pulls out a gun and calls the police. They question D about the death of Else, thrown from an upper window of the hotel. Enraged that an innocent girl has been killed, D grabs the gun and, evading pursuit, breaks into an empty flat.

Convinced that K is not only working for the rebels but is also a murderer, he takes him at gunpoint from the language school to the flat he has found. In the bathroom he shoots at him, but misses. Rose knocks on the outside door, having tracked him down, and they discover K has died of shock. The two admit that they have fallen in love, but she is meant to be marrying Forbes and he has to try and save his mission.

In a final effort to stop the deal with L, he takes a train to the Midlands town where Benditch's mine is and attempts to dissuade the workers by telling them where the coal is going. They put work ahead of solidarity. Some teenagers he befriends want to blow up the mine and he helps them, but is knocked out by the blast and taken back to London by the police.

Released on bail thanks to lawyers engaged by Forbes, he learns that the firm now think it too dangerous to sell coal to the rebels and have cancelled the deal with L. Realising where Rose's affections have gone, Forbes renounces her and agrees to drive D to the south coast, where he is taken out to a ship that is heading home. On the ship he finds Rose.

Altogether, D. has failed in his primary mission – to procure British coal for his own side – but at least managed to deny it to his foes.

== Setting ==
"D", a patriot from a country suffering a civil war, is in England to secure a contract with coal magnate Lord Benditch that will greatly assist the faltering loyalist cause. His country is nameless and the details of its history, geography, and current politics remain vague. However, the reader could have little doubt – and Greene himself admitted as much – that the Spanish Civil War was his main inspiration for the book's depiction of a left-leaning, popular revolutionary republic. Like Spain, the country in The Confidential Agent is embroiled internally in bitter factional fights while fighting a brutal civil war and a land-owning aristocracy determined to destroy the republic to regain its centuries-old privileged position. Underscoring the Spanish connection, in the novel's final section, a ship travelling from England to the unnamed country must sail westward in the Channel and then cross the Bay of Biscay.

== Themes ==
D is a man of peace, a university intellectual who values truth and honour. For the sake of his mission he initially accepts insults and beatings, until a turning point occurs. After all the injustices he has suffered, back in his home country and then in England, he becomes a solitary instrument of justice.

Without promoting a left-wing agenda, Greene shows a distaste for the authoritarian militaristic regime of the Nationalists in Spain and, readers then would quickly have made the connection, that of Nazi Germany and Fascist Italy. England by contrast, though often humdrum and uninspiring, is at peace under the rule of law. Greene emphasises the horrors of modern war, in particular the physical and mental effects of bombing on civilian populations.

Jews, for Forbes is Jewish, are portrayed as different from English or Spaniards. As in Stamboul Train, Greene uses a rich and sensual older Jewish man who fails to win the young Gentile girl he wants. In the end, however, a weeping Forbes rises above his self-interest.

Literary resonances are explicitly and covertly included, for Greene sought to ... create something legendary out of a contemporary thriller. The Chanson de Roland is used by D and Rose as a yardstick for measuring heroic or treacherous behaviour, while Rose's rôle as a mysterious helper to the hero reprises that of princesses like Ariadne and Medea. Greene saw D and Forbes as medieval knights, equally chivalrous in their actions.

== Adaptations ==
The novel was the basis for the 1945 film Confidential Agent, starring Charles Boyer, Lauren Bacall, Katina Paxinou and Peter Lorre. In the book, the nationality of the agent is not stated; in the film, he is Spanish.

The Confidential Agent was adapted for the radio program Escape by Ken Crossen and broadcast on 2 April 1949, starring Berry Kroeger.

== See also ==
- Confidential Agent (film)
