= Charles Waldstein =

Anglo-American archaeologist (1856–1927)

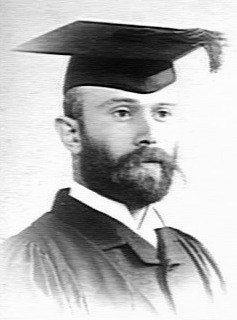
- Born: March 30, 1856; New York City, New York, United States
- Died: March 21, 1927 (aged 70); Naples, Italy
- Education: Columbia College (MA); University of Heidelberg (PhD)
- Children: Henry and 1 daughter
- Scientific career
- Fields: archaeology

Sir Charles Waldstein (March 30, 1856 – March 21, 1927), known as Sir Charles Walston from 1918 to 1927, was an Anglo-American archaeologist. He also competed at the 1896 Summer Olympics in Athens.

== Life ==
Waldstein was born into a Jewish family in New York City, United States, on March 30, 1856, third son of Henry Waldstein, a merchant, and Sophie, daughter of L. Srisheim, of New York. He was of Austrian descent.

Waldstein was educated at Columbia University (AM, 1873) where he was a member of the Philolexian Society, and also studied at Heidelberg (PhD, 1875). In 1880, he became university lecturer on classical archaeology at Cambridge University, and in 1883 university reader. From 1883 to 1889, he was director of the Fitzwilliam Museum. In 1889, he was called to Athens as director of the American School of Classical Studies, which office he held until 1893, when he became professor at the same institution. In 1894, he was made a fellow of King's College. In 1904, he returned to England as Slade Professor of Fine Art at Cambridge, a position for which he vied with Roger Fry; and he held this chair until 1912. During his stay in Athens, he directed the excavations of the Archaeological Institute of America at the site of ancient Plataea, Eretria, where he claimed to have unearthed the tomb of Aristotle, the Heraeum of Argos, among other discoveries. Later he formed an international committee to promote the excavation of Herculaneum.

He was knighted in 1912, appointed as Knight of the Danish Order of the Dannebrog, and appointed Commander of the Greek Order of the Redeemer.

He married Florence, daughter of D. L. Einstein and widow of Theodore Seligman, in 1909. They had one son, Henry, and a daughter, Evelyn Sophie Alexandra, who married the judge Sir Patrick Browne. He changed his surname to Walston in 1918 and died in 1927, while on a Mediterranean cruise.

== Publications ==
Besides writing the following books, Waldstein also published in journals numerous reports on his excavations. He wrote three short stories under the pseudonym 'Gordon Seymour' which were later released under his own name as The Surface of Things (1899).

- Balance of Emotion and Intellect (1878)
- Essays on the Art of Phidias (1885)
- The Jewish Question and the Mission of the Jews (1889, anon.; 2nd ed. 1900)
- The Work of John Ruskin (1893) (See John Ruskin.)
- The Study of Art in Universities (lecture, 10 June 1895)
- The Expansion of Western Ideals and the World's Peace (1899)
- The Argive Heraeum (1902)
- Art in the Nineteenth Century (1903)
- Aristodemocracy: From the Great War back to Moses, Christ and Plato (1916)
- Harmonism and Conscious Evolution (1922)

== Olympic Games ==
Waldstein competed at the 1896 Summer Olympics in Athens in the military rifle event. His final score and place in the competition are unknown, but his first two strings of 10 shots apiece resulted in scores of 354 and 154. This put him at 508 points halfway through the competition, but the rest of the results have been lost.
