= Graham Greene =

British writer and playwright (1904–1991)

Graham Greene OM CH
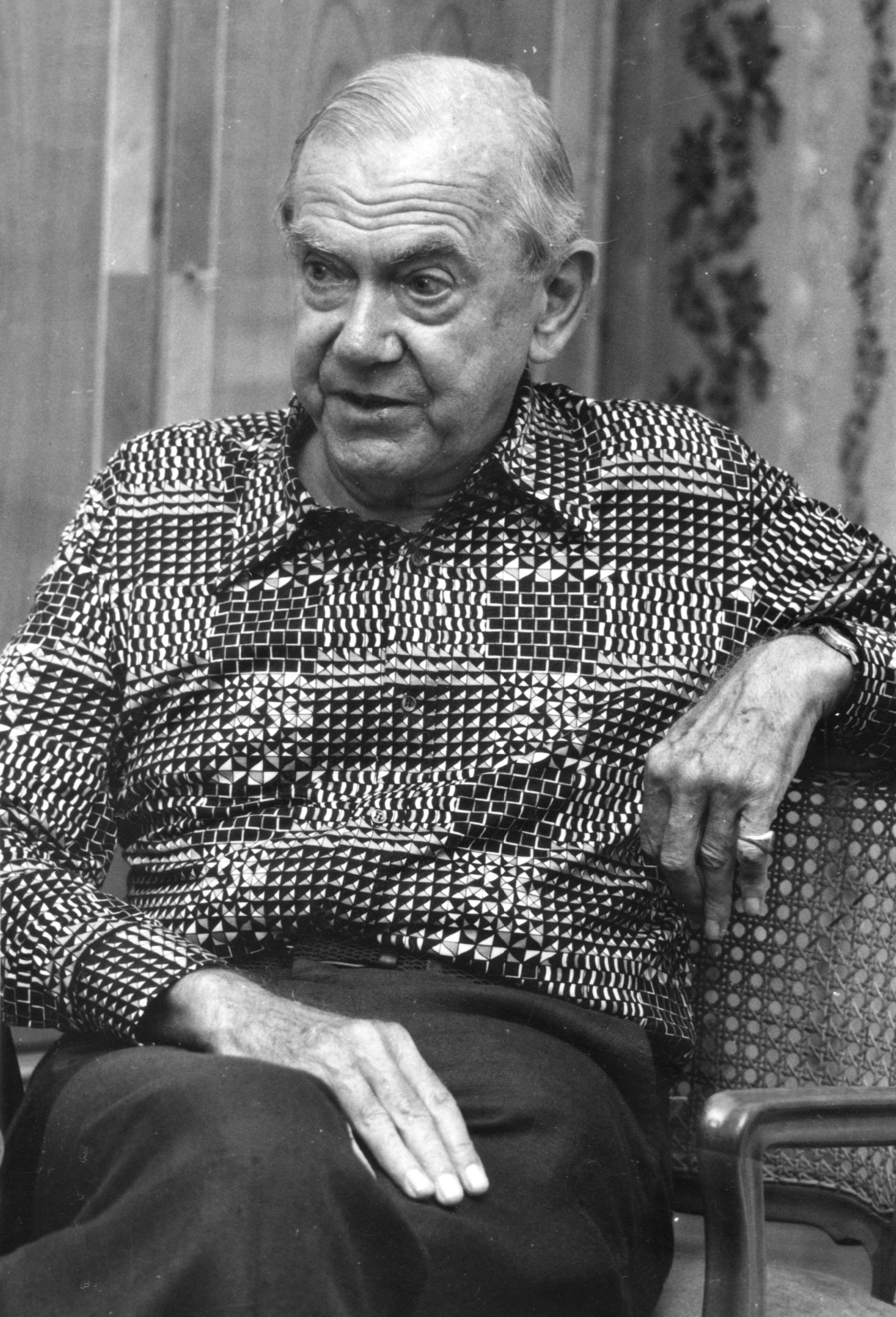
- Greene in 1975
- Born: Henry Graham Greene; 2 October 1904; Berkhamsted, Hertfordshire, England
- Died: 3 April 1991 (aged 86); Corseaux, Switzerland
- Education: University of Oxford
- Occupations: Writer; journalist
- Spouse: Vivien Dayrell-Browning (m. 1927; sep. 1947)
- Partner(s): Catherine Walston, Lady Walston (1946–1966); Yvonne Cloetta (1966–1991)
- Children: 2
- Relatives: Raymond Greene (brother); Graham C. Greene (nephew)
- Writing career
- Period: 1925–1991
- Genres: Literary fiction; thriller
- Notable works: Stamboul Train (1932); Brighton Rock (1938); The Power and the Glory (1940); The Heart of the Matter (1948); The End of the Affair (1951); The Quiet American (1955); Our Man in Havana (1958)
- Espionage activity
- Branch: Secret Intelligence Service
- Service years: 1941–1944
- Conflicts: World War II

Henry Graham Greene (2 October 1904 – 3 April 1991) was an English writer and journalist regarded by many as one of the leading novelists of the 20th century.

Combining literary acclaim with widespread popularity, Greene acquired a reputation early in his lifetime as a major writer, both of serious Catholic novels, and of thrillers (or "entertainments" as he termed them). He was shortlisted for the Nobel Prize in Literature several times. Through 67 years of writing, which included over 25 novels, he explored the conflicting moral and political issues of the modern world. The Power and the Glory won the 1941 Hawthornden Prize and The Heart of the Matter won the 1948 James Tait Black Memorial Prize and was shortlisted for the Best of the James Tait Black. Greene was awarded the 1968 Shakespeare Prize and the 1981 Jerusalem Prize. Several of his stories have been filmed, some more than once, and he collaborated with filmmaker Carol Reed on The Fallen Idol (1948) and The Third Man (1949).

He converted to Catholicism in 1926 after meeting his future wife, Vivien Dayrell-Browning. Later in life he called himself a "Catholic agnostic". He died in 1991, aged 86, of leukemia, and was buried in Corseaux cemetery in Switzerland. William Golding called Greene "the ultimate chronicler of twentieth-century man's consciousness and anxiety". V. S. Pritchett called him "the most ingenious, inventive and exciting of our novelists, rich in exactly etched and moving portraits of real human beings and who understands the tragic and comic ironies of love, loyalty and belief."

== Early years (1904–1922) ==
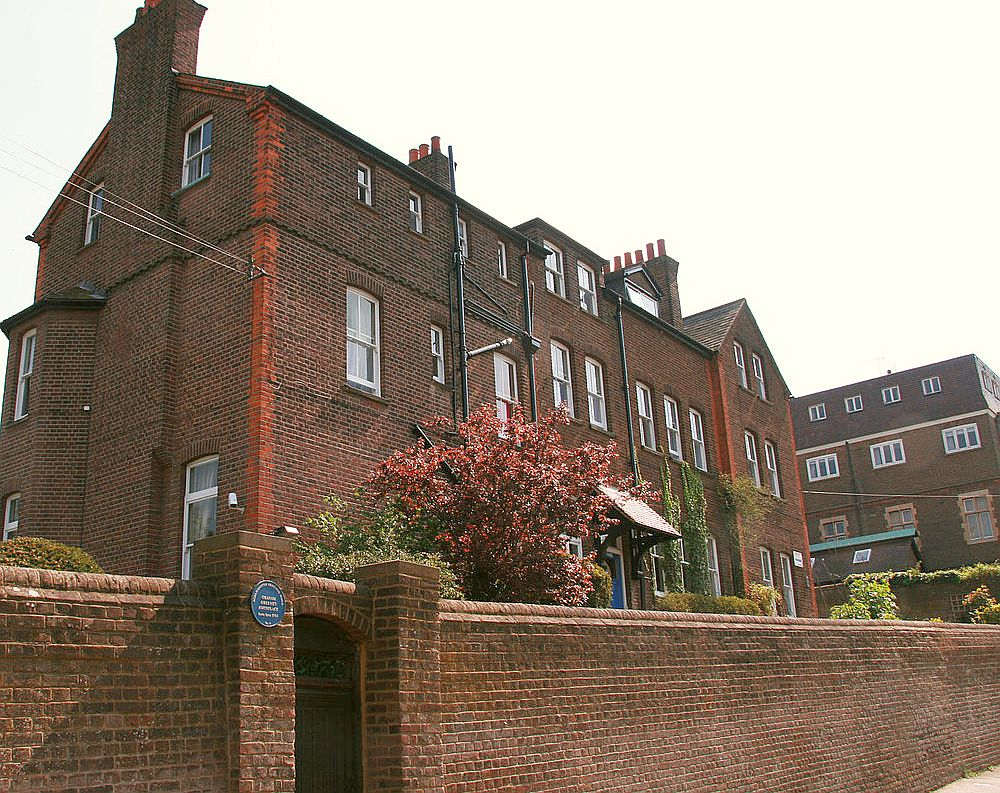
Greene was born in Berkhamsted School where his father taught.

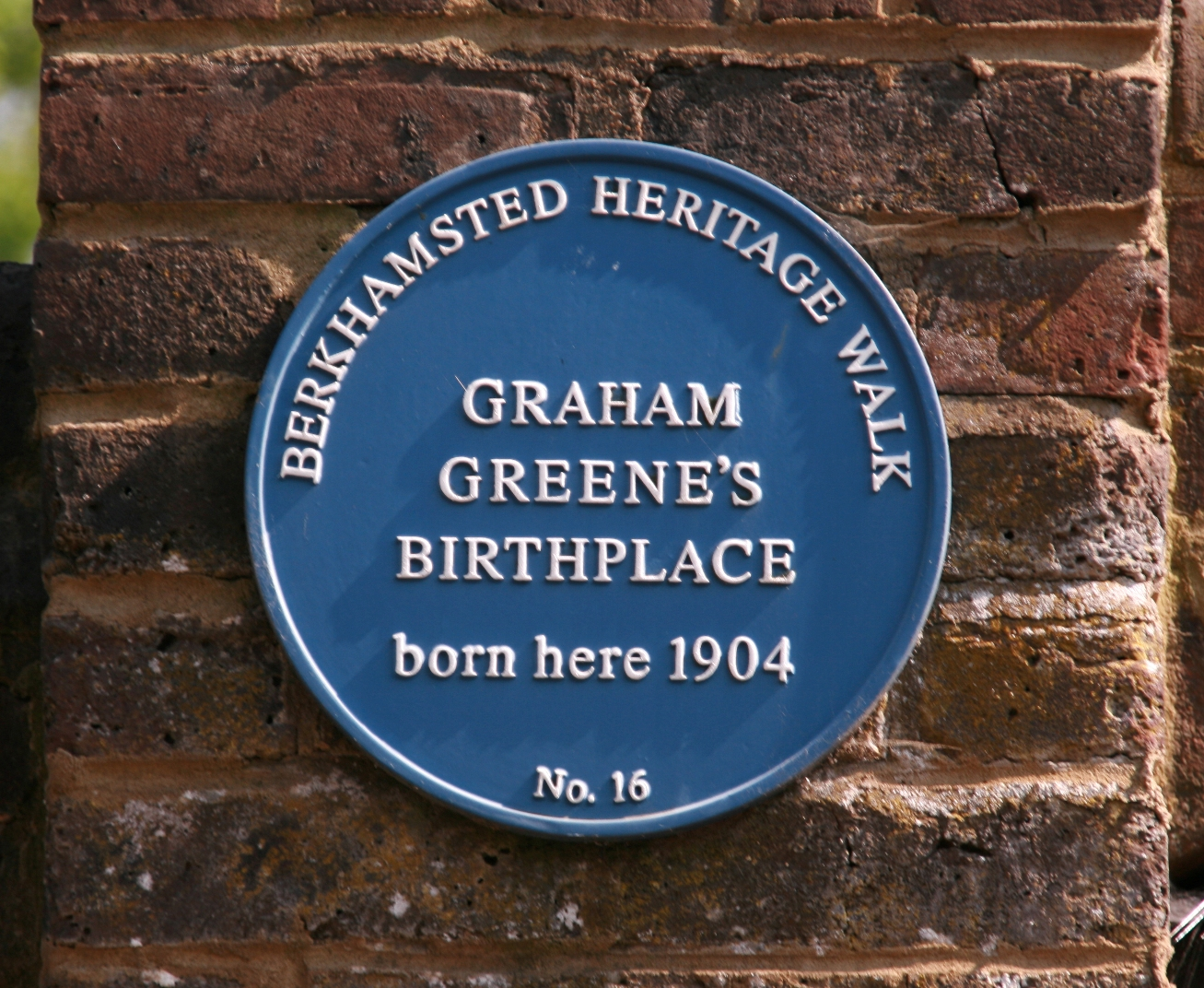
Graham Greene's birthplace blue plaque

Henry Graham Greene was born in 1904 in St John's House, a boarding house of Berkhamsted School, Hertfordshire, where his father was house master. He was the fourth of six children; his younger brother, Hugh, became Director-General of the BBC, and his elder brother, Raymond, an eminent physician and mountaineer.

His parents, Charles Henry Greene and Marion Raymond Greene, were first cousins, both members of a large, influential family that included the owners of Greene King Brewery, bankers, and statesmen; his grandmother Jane Wilson was first cousin to Robert Louis Stevenson.

Charles Greene was second master at Berkhamsted School, where the headmaster was Dr Thomas Fry, who was married to Charles' cousin. Another cousin was the right-wing pacifist Ben Greene, whose politics led to his internment during World War II.

In his childhood, Greene spent his summers at Harston House, the Cambridgeshire home of his uncle, Sir Graham Greene. In Greene's description of his childhood, he describes his learning to read there: "It was at Harston I quite suddenly found that I could read—the book was Dixon Brett, Detective. I didn't want anyone to know of my discovery, so I read only in secret, in a remote attic, but my mother must have spotted what I was at all the same, for she gave me Ballantyne's Coral Island for the train journey home—always an interminable journey with the long wait between trains at Bletchley..."

In 1910, Charles Greene succeeded Dr Fry as headmaster of Berkhamsted. Graham also attended the school as a boarder. Bullied and profoundly depressed, he made several suicide attempts, including, as he wrote in his autobiography, by Russian roulette and by taking aspirin before going swimming in the school pool. In 1920, aged 16, in what was a radical step for the time, he was sent for psychoanalysis for six months in London, afterwards returning to school as a day student. School friends included the journalist Claud Cockburn and the historian Peter Quennell.

Greene contributed several stories to the school magazine, one of which was published by a London evening newspaper in January 1921.

=== Oxford University ===
He attended Balliol College, Oxford, to study history. During this period Greene was for a short time a member of the Communist Party of Great Britain. (Note: His biographers variously date his membership to 1924 or 1925; Greene himself remembered it as four weeks in 1923. He described his undergraduate self as having "no scrap of Marxist belief" but hoping for "a free trip to Moscow and Leningrad, cities which six years after the Revolution still had a romantic appeal". In the 1950s, he was refused entry to the USA because of his youthful dalliance.) While he was an undergraduate at Balliol, his first book, a poorly received volume of poetry titled Babbling April, was published.

Greene had periodic bouts of depression while at Oxford, and largely kept to himself. Of Greene's time at Oxford, his contemporary Evelyn Waugh noted that: "Graham Greene looked down on us (and perhaps all undergraduates) as childish and ostentatious. He certainly shared in none of our revelry." He graduated in 1925 with a second-class degree.

== Writing career ==
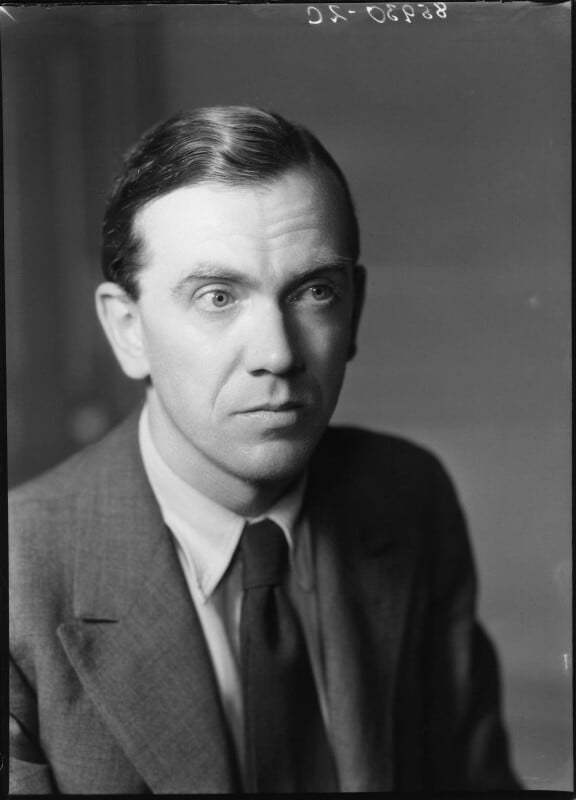
Greene in 1939

After leaving Oxford, Greene worked as a private tutor and then turned to journalism; first on the Nottingham Journal, and then as a sub-editor on The Times. While he was still at Oxford, he had started corresponding with Vivien Dayrell-Browning, who had written to him to correct him on a point of Catholic doctrine. Greene was an agnostic, but when he later began to think about marrying Vivien, it occurred to him that, as he puts it in his autobiography A Sort of Life, he "ought at least to learn the nature and limits of the beliefs she held". Greene was baptised on 28 February 1926 and they married on 15 October 1927 at St Mary's Church, Hampstead, London.

The Man Within (1929) was Greene's first published novel; (Note: This was the third novel Greene had completed. In 2009, a newly discovered manuscript titled The Empty Chair, written in longhand when Greene was 22 and a recent convert to Catholicism, appeared in The Strand Magazine in serial form.) after its favourable reception he left his job at The Times to work full-time as a novelist. The next two books, The Name of Action (1930) and Rumour at Nightfall (1932), were unsuccessful, however, and he later disowned them. (Note: In 1974, Greene said he had suppressed them from the Bodley Head–Heinemann Collected Edition of his works "without hesitation".) His first true success was Stamboul Train (1932) which was taken on by the Book Society and adapted as the film Orient Express, in 1934.

Although Greene objected to being described as a Roman Catholic novelist, rather than as a novelist who happened to be Catholic, (Note: For example, when Anthony Burgess asked Greene in an interview whether his novels were the first "in English to present evil as something palpable—not a theological abstraction but an entity", Greene replied, "I see we're getting on to myself as a Catholic novelist. I'm not that: I'm a novelist who happens to be a Catholic. The theme of human beings lonely without God is a legitimate fictional subject. To want to deal with the theme doesn't make me a theologian." Greene rejected the label on other occasions.) Catholic religious themes are at the root of much of his writing, especially Brighton Rock, The Power and the Glory, The Heart of the Matter, and The End of the Affair, which have been named "the gold standard" of the Catholic novel. Several works, such as The Confidential Agent, The Quiet American, Our Man in Havana, The Human Factor, and his screenplay for The Third Man, also show Greene's avid interest in the workings and intrigues of international politics and espionage. In the early 1930s Greene moved to the left politically. He read left-wing writers like G.D.H. Cole and John Strachey; in 1933 he joined the Independent Labour Party. This move to the left is reflected in the characters and plot of his fifth novel It's A Battlefield. His later political affiliations and convictions were more ambiguous. He supplemented his novelist's income with freelance journalism, book and film reviews for The Spectator, and co-editing the magazine Night and Day. His collected film reviews were later published as The Pleasure Dome (1972). Greene's 1937 film review of Wee Willie Winkie, for Night and Day—which said that the nine-year-old star, Shirley Temple, displayed "a dubious coquetry" which appealed to "middle-aged men and clergymen"—provoked Twentieth Century Fox successfully to sue for £3,500 plus costs, and Greene left the UK to live in Mexico until after the trial was over. While in Mexico, Greene developed the ideas for the novel often considered his masterpiece, The Power and the Glory.

By the 1950s, Greene had become known as one of the finest writers of his generation.

Greene also wrote short stories and plays, which were well received, although he was always first and foremost a novelist. His first successful play, The Living Room, debuted in 1952.

Michael Korda, a lifelong friend and later his editor at Simon & Schuster, observed Greene at work: Greene wrote in a small black leather notebook with a black fountain pen and would write approximately 500 words. Korda described this as Graham's daily penance—once he finished he put the notebook away for the rest of the day.

His writing influences included Henry James, Robert Louis Stevenson, H. Rider Haggard, Joseph Conrad, Ford Madox Ford, Marcel Proust, Charles Péguy and John Buchan.

=== Travel and espionage ===
Part of Greene's reputation as a novelist is for weaving the characters he met and the places where he lived into the fabric of his novels. Greene himself responded to commentators who called the world of his fiction an imaginary place:

Some critics have referred to a strange violent 'seedy' region of the mind (why did I ever popularize that last adjective?) which they call Greeneland, and I have sometimes wondered whether they go around the world blinkered. 'This is Indo-China,' I want to exclaim, 'this is Mexico, this is Sierra Leone carefully and accurately described. I have been a newspaper correspondent as well as a novelist. I assure you that the dead child lay in the ditch in just that attitude. In the canal of Phat Diem the bodies stuck out of the water...'

Throughout his life, Greene travelled to what he called the world's wild and remote places. In 1941, the travels led to his being recruited into MI6 by his sister, Elisabeth, who worked for the agency. Accordingly, he was posted to Sierra Leone during the Second World War. Kim Philby, who was later found to be a Soviet agent, was Greene's supervisor and friend at MI6. Greene resigned from MI6 in 1944. He later wrote an introduction to Philby's 1968 memoir, My Silent War. Greene also corresponded with intelligence officer and spy John Cairncross for forty years; the correspondence is held by the John J. Burns Library, at Boston College.

Greene first left Europe at 30 years of age in 1935 on a trip to Liberia that produced the travel book Journey Without Maps. His 1938 trip to Mexico to see the effects of the government's campaign of forced anti-Catholic secularisation was paid for by the publishing company Longman, thanks to his friendship with Tom Burns. That voyage produced two books, the non-fiction The Lawless Roads (published as Another Mexico in the US) and the novel The Power and the Glory. In 1953, the Holy Office informed Greene that The Power and the Glory was damaging to the reputation of the priesthood; but later, in a private audience with Greene, Pope Paul VI told him that, although parts of his novels would offend some Catholics, he should ignore the criticism.

In 1950 his brother Hugh Carleton Greene, who was head of UK Information Services in Malaya, brought Greene to Malaya during the early phase of the Malayan Emergency. Greene returned to England via Indo-China in 1951 to visit his friend Trevor Wilson, British consul in Hanoi. There he met General Jean de Lattre de Tassigny, French high commissioner and commander-in-chief of the French Expeditionary Corps. Greene returned several times and wrote newspaper articles and developed the book, The Quiet American.

In 1954, Greene travelled to Haiti. He returned in 1956. In 1957 François Duvalier, known as "Papa Doc", was elected president over Louis Déjoie. Greene returned to Haiti in 1963 staying at the Hotel Oloffson in Port-au-Prince, where The Comedians (1966) is set. His 1963 article in the Sunday Telegraph, "Nightmare Republic," was a first-hand account of Duvalier's dictatorship in which Greene depicted Haiti as a place of profound terror and paranoia, where the regime's brutal militia, the Tontons Macoutes, engaged in widespread torture, extortion, and violence against the population.

As inspiration for his novel A Burnt-Out Case (1960), Greene spent time travelling around Africa visiting a number of leper colonies in the Congo Basin and in what were then the British Cameroons. During this trip in late February and early March 1959, Greene met several times with Andrée de Jongh, a leader in the Belgian resistance during WWII, who famously established an escape route to Gibraltar through the Pyrenees for downed allied airmen.

In 1957, just months after Fidel Castro began his final revolutionary assault on the Batista regime in Cuba, Greene played a small role in helping the revolutionaries, as a secret courier transporting warm clothing for Castro's rebels hiding in the hills during the Cuban winter. Greene's friendship with Castro, and with undemocratic Latin American leaders such as Daniel Ortega and Omar Torrijos, led some commentators to question his commitment to democracy. After one visit Castro gave Greene a painting he had done, which hung in the living room of the French house where the author spent the last years of his life. Greene did later voice doubts about Castro, telling a French interviewer in 1983, "I admire him for his courage and his efficiency, but I question his authoritarianism," adding: "All successful revolutions, however idealistic, probably betray themselves in time."

=== Publishing career ===
Between 1944 and 1948, Greene was director at Eyre & Spottiswoode under chairman Douglas Jerrold, in charge of developing its fiction list. Greene created The Century Library series, which was discontinued after he left following a conflict with Jerrold regarding Anthony Powell's contract. In 1958, Greene was offered the position of chairman by Oliver Crosthwaite-Eyre, but declined.

He was a director at The Bodley Head from 1957 to 1968 under Max Reinhardt. He used his influence to stop the firm putting his own novels forward for the Booker Prize, which he felt should go to younger writers, and to champion Richard Power, whose The Hungry Grass he persuaded Bodley to nominate for a posthumous Booker.

== Personal life ==
Greene was an agnostic, but was baptised into the Catholic faith in 1926 after meeting his future wife Vivien Dayrell-Browning. They were married on 15 October 1927 at St Mary's Church, Hampstead, north London. The Greenes had two children, Lucy Caroline Bourget Greene (born 1933) and Francis Greene (born 1936), who became his father's literary executor.

In his discussions with Father George Trollope, the priest to whom he went for instruction in Catholicism, Greene argued with the cleric "on the ground of dogmatic atheism", as Greene's primary difficulty with religion was what he termed the "if" surrounding the existence of a God. He found, however, that "after a few weeks of serious argument the 'if' was becoming less and less improbable", and Greene converted and was baptised after vigorous arguments initially with the priest in which he defended atheism, or at least the "if" of agnosticism. Late in life, Greene called himself a "Catholic agnostic".

From 1946 Greene conducted an affair with Catherine Walston, the wife of Henry Walston, a wealthy farmer and future life peer. During this time they spent three or four significant periods living in Catherine's cottage in Dooagh, Achill Island, off the coast of Ireland. That period is generally thought to have informed the writing of The End of the Affair, published in 1951, which was dedicated to her. Walston's husband demanded that the adulterous relationship cease after the publication of the book, but it continued until about 1966.

Greene left his family in 1947, but Vivien refused to grant him a divorce, in accordance with Catholic teaching, and they remained married until Greene's death in 1991.

Greene lived with manic depression (bipolar disorder). He had a history of depression, which had a profound effect on his writing and personal life. In a letter to his wife, he told her that he had "a character profoundly antagonistic to ordinary domestic life", and that "unfortunately, the disease is also one's material".

== Final years ==
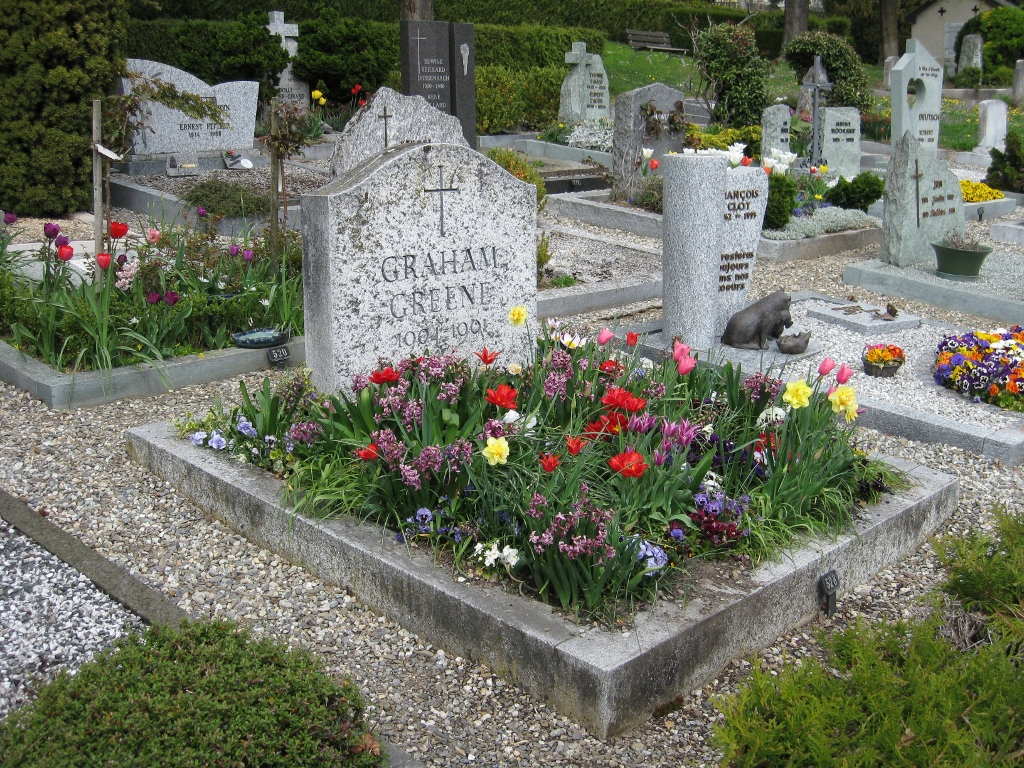
Gravestone at Corseaux, Switzerland

Greene left Britain in 1966, moving to Antibes, to be close to Yvonne Cloetta, whom he had known since 1959, a relationship that endured until his death. In 1973, he had an uncredited cameo appearance as an insurance company representative in François Truffaut's film Day for Night. In 1981, Greene was awarded the Jerusalem Prize, awarded to writers concerned with the freedom of the individual in society.

He lived the last years of his life in Corseaux, on Lake Geneva in Switzerland, near Vevey where Charlie Chaplin was living in at this time. He visited Chaplin often, and the two were good friends.

His book Doctor Fischer of Geneva or the Bomb Party (1980) deals with "the deadly sins of greed, pride, and despair."

He ceased going to mass and confession in the 1950s, but in his final years began to receive the sacraments again from Father Leopoldo Durán, a Spanish priest, who became a friend.

In one of his final works, a pamphlet titled J'Accuse: The Dark Side of Nice (1982), Greene wrote of a legal matter that embroiled him and his extended family in Nice, and said that organised crime flourished in Nice because the city's upper levels of civic government protected judicial and police corruption. The accusation provoked a libel lawsuit that Greene lost, but the former mayor of Nice that Greene wrote about, Jacques Médecin, was later investigated, and imprisoned after Greene's death, for corruption and associated crimes.

In 1984, in celebration of his 80th birthday, the Greene King Brewery, which Greene's great-grandfather had founded in 1799, produced a special edition of its St. Edmund's Ale with a special label for him. Commenting on turning 80, Greene said, "The big advantage ... is that at 80 you are more likely these days to beat out encountering your end in a nuclear war," adding, "the other side of the problem is that I really don't want to survive myself [which] has nothing to do with nukes, but with the body hanging around while the mind departs."

In 1986, Greene was awarded Britain's Order of Merit. He died of leukaemia in 1991 at the age of 86, and was buried in Corseaux cemetery.

== Writing style and themes ==
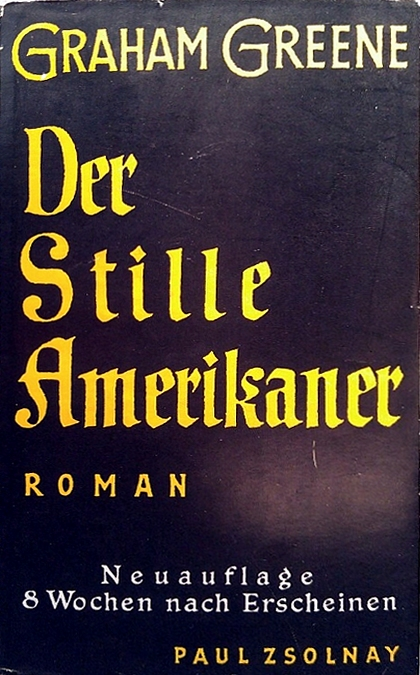
Cover of the second German edition of The Quiet American (1956), claiming to be on sale only eight weeks after the first edition, with the implication that the first is already sold out

Beginning with Stamboul Train in 1932, Greene divided his fiction into two genres: thrillers (mystery and suspense books), which he described as entertainments; and literary works, which he described as novels. As his career lengthened, both Greene and his readers found the distinction between "entertainments" and "novels" to be less evident. When the broadly comic Travels with My Aunt (1969) was published, the New York Times reviewer felt that it blurred the boundaries between the two: "Travels With My Aunt, the title page tells us, belongs to the 'novel' category, but reading the book very soon establishes that it is also extremely entertaining and often very funny." When Heinemann and Bodley Head reissued Greene's "entertainment" The Confidential Agent and his "novel" The Power and the Glory together in 1971 as part of their Collected Edition of Greene's works, Julian Symons noted the "close relationship" between the genres; as the edition progressed, Eric Ambler pointed out that Greene was redesignating all his "entertainments" as novels, adding "His reputation as a major twentieth-century novelist is likely to remain unimpaired."

Greene was one of the more "cinematic" of twentieth-century writers; most of his novels and many of his plays and short stories have been adapted for film or television. The 2014 edition of Quentin Falk's Travels in Greeneland: The Cinema of Graham Greene lists 62 titles between 1933 and 2013 based on Greene material. Some novels were filmed more than once, such as Brighton Rock in 1947 and 2011, The End of the Affair in 1955 and 1999, and The Quiet American in 1958 and 2002. The 1936 thriller A Gun for Sale was filmed three times in English alone, notably as This Gun for Hire in 1942. Greene received an Academy Award nomination for the screenplay for Carol Reed's The Fallen Idol (1948), adapted from his own short story The Basement Room. He also wrote several original screenplays. In 1949, after writing the novella as "raw material", he wrote the screenplay for a classic film noir, The Third Man, also directed by Reed and featuring Orson Welles and Joseph Cotten. In 1983, The Honorary Consul, published ten years earlier, was released as a film (under the title Beyond the Limit in some territories), starring Michael Caine and Richard Gere. Author and screenwriter Michael Korda contributed a foreword and introduction to this novel in a commemorative edition.

Greene's literary style was described by Evelyn Waugh in Commonweal as "not a specifically literary style at all. The words are functional, devoid of sensuous attraction, of ancestry and of independent life". Commenting on the lean prose and its readability, Richard Jones wrote in the Virginia Quarterly Review that "nothing deflects Greene from the main business of holding the reader's attention". Greene's novels often have religious themes at their centre. In his literary criticism he attacked the modernist writers Virginia Woolf and E. M. Forster for having lost the religious sense which, he argued, resulted in dull, superficial characters, who "wandered about like cardboard symbols through a world that is paper-thin". Only in recovering the religious element, the awareness of the drama of the struggle in the soul that carries the permanent consequence of salvation or damnation, and of the ultimate metaphysical realities of good and evil, sin and divine grace, could the novel recover its dramatic power. Suffering and unhappiness are omnipresent in the world Greene depicts; and Catholicism is presented against a background of unvarying human evil, sin, and doubt. V. S. Pritchett praised Greene as the first English novelist since Henry James to present, and grapple with, the reality of evil. Greene concentrated on portraying the characters' internal lives—their mental, emotional, and spiritual depths. His stories are often set in poor, hot and dusty tropical places such as Mexico, West Africa, Vietnam, Cuba, Haiti, and Argentina, which led to the coining of the expression "Greeneland" to describe such settings.

A stranger with no shortage of calling cards: devout Catholic, lifelong adulterer, pulpy hack, canonical novelist; self-destructive, meticulously disciplined, deliriously romantic, bitterly cynical; moral relativist, strict theologian, salon communist, closet monarchist; civilized to a stuffy fault and louche to drugged-out distraction, anti-imperialist crusader and postcolonial parasite, self-excoriating and self-aggrandizing, to name just a few.

— The Nation, describing the many facets of Graham Greene

The novels often portray the dramatic struggles of the individual soul from a Catholic perspective. Greene was criticised for certain tendencies in an unorthodox direction—for example, the implication that Scobie in The Heart of the Matter, by deliberately causing his own damnation, sacrifices himself for others and thereby sanctifies his sins. His friend and fellow Catholic Evelyn Waugh attacked that as a revival of the Quietist heresy. This aspect of his work also was criticised by the theologian Hans Urs von Balthasar, as giving sin a mystique. Greene responded that constructing a vision of pure faith and goodness in the novel was beyond his talents. Praise of Greene from an orthodox Catholic point of view by Edward Short is in Crisis Magazine, and a mainstream Catholic critique is presented by Joseph Pearce.

Catholicism's prominence decreased in his later writings. (Note: Asked in 1980 whether Fischer in Doctor Fischer of Geneva was evil, he replied, "The big Catholic verities like good and evil – you won't find these in my later work".) The supernatural preoccupations of the earlier work declined and were replaced by a humanistic perspective, a change reflected in his public criticism of orthodox Catholic teaching.

In his later years, Greene was a strong critic of American imperialism and sympathised with the Cuban leader Fidel Castro, whom he had met. Years before the Vietnam War, he prophetically attacked the idealistic but arrogant beliefs of The Quiet American, whose certainty in his own virtue kept him from seeing the disaster he inflicted on the Vietnamese. In Ways of Escape, reflecting on a Mexican trip, he criticised Mexico's government for "making a hypocritical pretence of supporting Cuba" while simultaneously feeding intelligence on visitors to the American authorities. In the 1930s he was already praising Ignazio Silone for his attempt to reconcile the social messages of Catholicism and Marxism; in Greene's opinion, "Conservatism and Catholicism should be ... impossible bedfellows".

In human relationships, kindness and lies are worth a thousand truths.

— Graham Greene

In May 1949, the New Statesman held a contest for parodies of Greene's writing style: he himself submitted an entry under the name "N. Wilkinson", and took second place. Greene's entry comprised the first two paragraphs of a novel, apparently set in Italy, The Stranger's Hand: An Entertainment. Greene's friend, the film director Mario Soldati, believed it had the makings of a suspense film about Yugoslav spies in postwar Venice. Upon Soldati's prompting, Greene continued writing the story as the basis for a film script. Apparently he lost interest in the project, leaving it as a substantial fragment that was published posthumously in The Graham Greene Film Reader (1993) and No Man's Land (2005). A script for The Stranger's Hand was written by Guy Elmes on the basis of Greene's unfinished story, and filmed by Soldati. In 1965, Greene again entered a similar New Statesman competition pseudonymously, and won an honourable mention.

== Nobel Prize in Literature candidate ==
Acclaimed during his lifetime, Greene was for many years a perennial contender for the Nobel Prize in Literature, and he was shortlisted for the prize several times by the Swedish Academy's Nobel committee. Greene was first nominated in 1950 and was shortlisted for that year's prize. In 1961 he was among the final three candidates for the prize. Anders Österling, chair of the Nobel committee, stated that Greene "is fully worthy of the prize, not just in regard of his most recent work [A Burnt-Out Case], but for his vigorous work as a whole", but the prize that year was awarded to the Yugoslavian writer Ivo Andrić.

In 1966 and 1967, Greene was again among the final three choices, according to Nobel records unsealed on the 50th anniversary. For the 1967 prize the committee also considered Jorge Luis Borges and Miguel Ángel Asturias. Committee chairman Anders Österling again pushed for a prize to Greene describing him as "an accomplished observer whose experience encompasses a global diversity of external environments, and above all the mysterious aspects of the inner world, human conscience, anxiety and nightmares", but ultimately Asturias was the chosen winner.

In 1969, when Samuel Beckett and André Malraux were the main contenders for the prize, Greene's candidacy was however dismissed by the Nobel committee. Committee member Karl Ragnar Gierow stated: "Despite my admiration for several of his earlier works, I would not even then have placed him in the class where a Nobel laureate belongs". The following year Gierow further elaborated that Greene's best work was too far back in time, and that his most recent novel Travels With My Aunt was not of Nobel prize class, stating "If the committee excludes him from its proposal this year, it seems to mean that it considers him out of the discussion, in case he does not return to the level that once made his name relevant."

Following the publication of his novel The Honorary Consul, Greene was shortlisted again in 1974, but this time the Nobel committee was hesitant to award an English language novelist for a second year in succession following the prize awarded to Patrick White the previous year, and Greene was passed over. In 1975 Greene was shortlisted once more as one of the final five candidates for the prize, but was passed over again.

Greene remained a favourite to win the Nobel prize in the 1980s, but it was known that two influential members of the Swedish Academy, Artur Lundkvist and Lars Gyllensten, opposed the prize for Greene and he was never awarded. (Note: When an interviewer asked Greene in 1984 about his persistent failure to win the prize, he replied, "Don't let's talk about it... It's always the same story of poor Mr Arthur Lundqvist saying 'over my dead body'.")

== Legacy ==
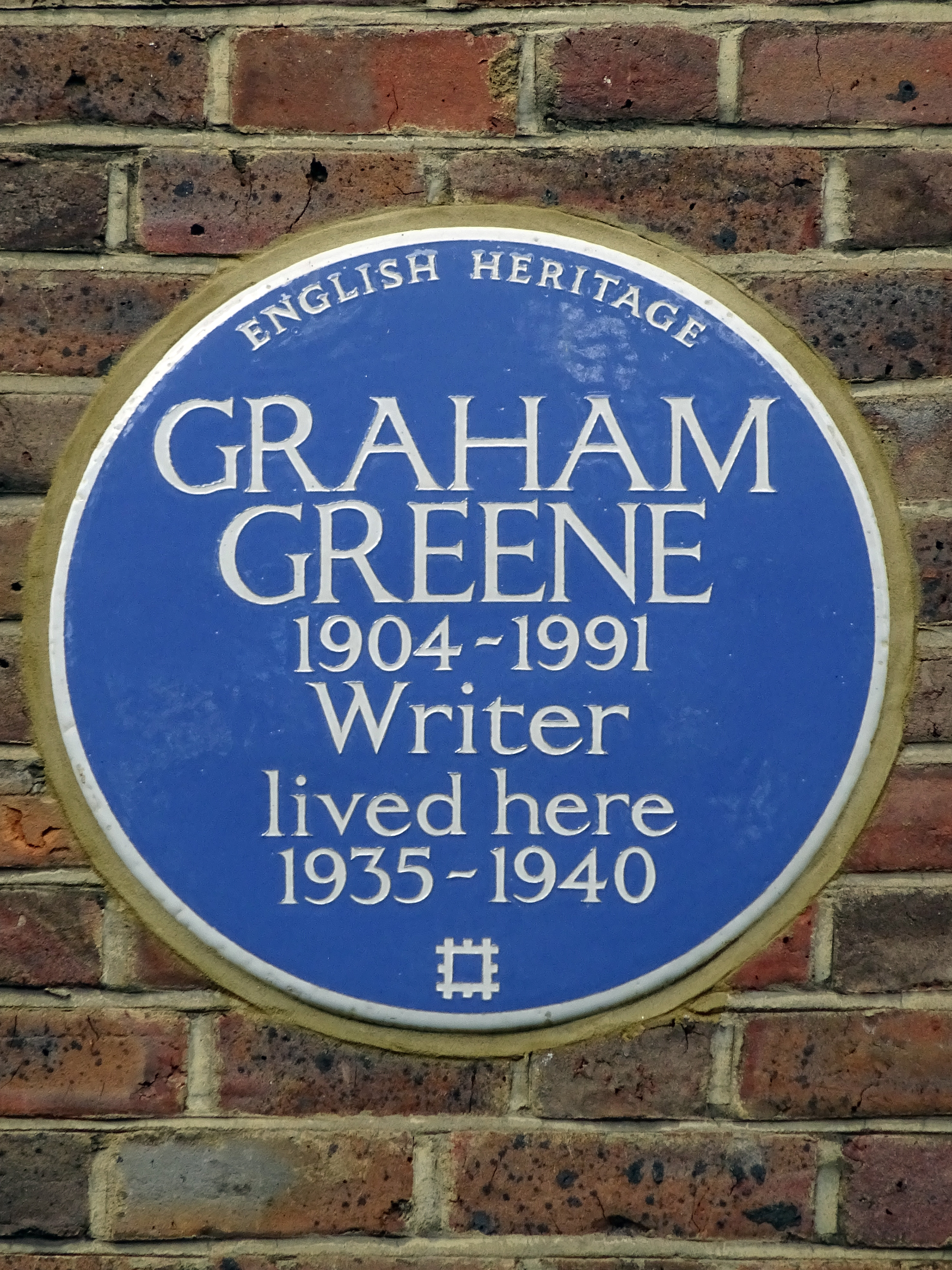
Blue plaque erected in 2011 by English Heritage at 14 Clapham Common North Side, Clapham, London

Greene is regarded as a major 20th-century novelist, and was praised by John Irving, before Greene's death, as "the most accomplished living novelist in the English language". Novelist Frederick Buechner called Greene's novel The Power and the Glory a "tremendous influence". By 1943, Greene had acquired the reputation of being the "leading English male novelist of his generation", and at the time of his death in 1991 had a reputation as a writer of both deeply serious novels on the theme of Catholicism, and of "suspense-filled stories of detection".

Greene collected several literary awards for his novels, including the 1941 Hawthornden Prize for The Power and the Glory and the 1948 James Tait Black Memorial Prize for The Heart of the Matter. As an author, he received the 1968 Shakespeare Prize and the 1981 Jerusalem Prize, a biennial literary award given to writers whose works have dealt with themes of human freedom in society. In 1986, he was awarded Britain's Order of Merit.

The Graham Greene International Festival is an annual four-day event of conference papers, informal talks, question and answer sessions, films, dramatised readings, music, creative writing workshops and social events. It is organised by the Graham Greene Birthplace Trust, and takes place in the writer's home town of Berkhamsted (about 35 miles north-west of London), on dates as close as possible to the anniversary of his birth (2 October). Its purpose is to promote interest in and study of the works of Graham Greene.

He is the subject of the 2013 documentary film, Dangerous Edge: A Life of Graham Greene. His 1987 trip to Moscow to visit Kim Philby is the subject of Ben Brown's play A Splinter of Ice (first staged 2021 and filmed that year); Oliver Ford Davies originally played Greene. Greene also features as a character in the film The Honourable Rebel (2015) about Elizabeth Montagu who worked with him on the script of The Third Man. In the 2001 film Donnie Darko, the protagonist is inspired by a classroom discussion of Greene's short story "The Destructors" and its line "destruction after all is a form of creation".

== Selected works ==
- The Man Within (debut; 1929)
- Stamboul Train (1932; also published as Orient Express in the US)
- It's a Battlefield (1934)
- England Made Me (also published as The Shipwrecked; 1935)
- A Gun for Sale (1936)
- Journey Without Maps (1936)
- Brighton Rock (1938)
- The Lawless Roads (1939; also published as Another Mexico in the US)
- The Confidential Agent (1939)
- The Power and the Glory (1940)
- The Ministry of Fear (1943)
- The Heart of the Matter (1948)
- The Third Man (1950; novella written in 1948 as a preliminary to Greene's screenplay for the film The Third Man)
- The End of the Affair (1951)
- Twenty-One Stories (1954; short stories)
- Loser Takes All (1955)
- The Quiet American (1955)
- The Potting Shed (1956)
- Our Man in Havana (1958)
- A Burnt-Out Case (1960)
- In Search of a Character: Two African Journals (1961)
- The Comedians (1966)
- Travels with My Aunt (1969)
- A Sort of Life (1971)
- The Honorary Consul (1973)
- The Human Factor (1978)
- Ways of Escape (1980)
- Doctor Fischer of Geneva (1980)
- Monsignor Quixote (1982)
- Getting to Know the General: The Story of an Involvement (1984)
- The Tenth Man (1985)
- The Captain and the Enemy (1988)
- The Last Word (1990; short story)

== Selected adaptations ==
=== Film ===
- This Gun for Hire (1942)
- Went the Day Well? (1942)
- Ministry of Fear (1944)
- The Fugitive (1947)
- The Heart of the Matter (1953)
- The Stranger's Hand (1954)
- The End of the Affair (1955, 1999)
- Across the Bridge (1957)
- The Quiet American (1958, 2002)
- The Human Factor (1979)
- Brighton Rock (2010)

=== Screenplays by Greene ===
- The Future's in the Air (1937, short)
- The New Britain (1940, short)
- 21 Days (1940)
- Brighton Rock (1947)
- The Fallen Idol (1948)
- The Third Man (1949)
- Loser Takes All (1956)
- Saint Joan (1957)
- Our Man in Havana (1959)
- The Comedians (1967)
- Monsignor Quixote (1985)

=== Television ===
- The Power and the Glory (1961 film)
- The Potting Shed (1961, 1981)
- Shades of Greene (1975)
- Doctor Fischer of Geneva (1984 film)
- Monsignor Quixote (1985 film)
- The Tenth Man (1988 film)
