= The Human Factor (1979 film) =

1979 British neo-noir film by Otto Preminger

- Theatrical release poster by Saul Bass
- Directed by: Otto Preminger
- Written by: Tom Stoppard
- Based on: The Human Factor; 1978 novel by Graham Greene
- Starring: Richard Attenborough; Derek Jacobi; John Gielgud; Nicol Williamson
- Cinematography: Mike Molloy
- Edited by: Richard Trevor
- Music by: Richard Logan; Gary Logan
- Production companies: Sigma Production; Wheel Productions
- Distributed by: United Artists (North America); Rank Film Distributors (United Kingdom)
- Release date: 18 December 1979; (Los Angeles)
- Running time: 115 minutes
- Country: United Kingdom
- Language: English
- Budget: £5,500,000
- Box office: $376,050

The Human Factor is a 1979 British neo-noir film starring Nicol Williamson, Robert Morley, and Richard Attenborough, and directed and produced by Otto Preminger. The screenplay is by Tom Stoppard, based on the 1978 novel The Human Factor by Graham Greene. It examines British espionage, and the difficulty of identifying a mole in the ranks of an intelligence service.

This was Preminger's last film.

== Plot ==
Maurice Castle is a well-bred, mid-level bureaucrat in MI6 whose life seems unremarkable, apart from the fact that he has an African wife, Sarah, and son, Sam. The company regime, represented by éminence grise Dr. Percival and agency higher-up Sir John Hargreaves, advise newly appointed security chief Daintry that analysis of intelligence from a double agent they have planted in Moscow indicates that there is a leak in Castle's department. The info being shared with the KGB is trivial, but one never knows where things may lead.

The duo determine the mole must be identified and quietly eliminated, rather than be allowed publicity in a trial or defection to Moscow. They quickly decide the most likely candidate for the traitor is Arthur Davis, Castle's red brick–educated playboy office partner.

Percival plants a seemingly tantalising intelligence tidbit with Davis (which he and Hargreaves assume will be passed on to the Soviets) as a means of smoking him out. Instead, unravelled by the intensive security scrutiny he is being subjected to, and utterly clueless why, Davis idly shares it with Castle. When the telltale bait shows up in Moscow, Percival concludes with myopic certainty that Davis was its source. An expert in assassinations and biological toxins, the doctor then injects a hungover, bedridden Davis with a toxin that makes it appear the man's liver had given out from alcoholism.

Castle is given the task of hosting an old nemesis from his days being posted in apartheid South Africa seven years earlier: chief intelligence officer Muller. It was he who had tormented Castle after Castle met and fell in love with Sarah. Operating under his cover as a writer, Castle had been tasked by MI6 with observing the local Communist movement. He befriended its white leader, Matthew Connolly, who introduced him to the beautiful, sophisticated Bantu, Sarah. The couple fell for one another, and soon became intimate. Caught in a South African surveillance sting intended to compromise him into doing Muller's bidding, Castle fled the country to avoid arrest and exposure, then awaited Sarah – pregnant by a previous, then-deceased boyfriend – being smuggled to him by Connolly.

Ever since then, Castle has been repaying the favour by passing information on to the Soviets via a contact in London, and flinches when Muller casually drops that Connolly had recently "accidentally" died in police custody. Shortly after, he learns in an agency briefing given by Muller of a plan for the South Africans to use U.S.-supplied tactical nuclear weapons to eradicate the nation's Communist insurgents en masse. Although he is not a Communist, Castle feels compelled as a humanitarian to pass a warning on to Moscow, no matter the risk of shining MI6's counterintelligence security spotlight on himself.

Seeking to stay one step ahead of Percival and Daintry, he surrenders himself into the hands of underground Communist operatives in Britain, who successfully smuggle him to safety in the Soviet Union. Having received assurances from his handler that his wife and child would soon join him there, he grows impatient when he learns that MI6 is preventing them from leaving Britain. Ultimately, a passport complication is arranged to force Sarah to choose between her husband and son.

Desperate, despondent, and isolated, Castle is reduced to a powerless pawn by the Soviets and forced to appear in a press conference both announcing his defection and denouncing the "Uncle Remus" nuclear ambush plan. The two worst fates of which he can conceive – losing his wife and child, and not only forfeiting his career and nation but being coerced into representing himself as both a Communist and a traitor when he never intended to be either – close in on him like the jaws of a vice. He is so overcome to hear from Sarah that she cannot, will not come, he is unable even to hang up the phone when their connection is lost. He collapses in anguish as its receiver swings like a pendulum from its cord, foreshadowing the approaching end of his rope.

== Cast ==
- Nicol Williamson as Maurice Castle
- Richard Attenborough as Colonel Daintry
- John Gielgud as Brigadier Tomlinson
- Derek Jacobi as Arthur Davis
- Robert Morley as Doctor Percival
- Ann Todd as Castle's Mother
- Iman as Sarah Castle
- Joop Doderer as Cornelius Muller
- Richard Vernon as Sir John Hargreaves
- Angela Thorne as Lady Mary Hargreaves
- Tony Haygarth as Buffy
- Fiona Fullerton as Elizabeth
- Martin Benson as Boris
- Adrienne Corri as Sylvia

== Production ==
The film was shot in Kenya and at Shepperton and Pinewood Studios near London, as well as on location at Berkhamsted. As with the book, much of the theme about alleged treason and suspicion is based on the defection of Kim Philby, a friend of Graham Greene, to the Soviets. Iman, an internationally known model, was introduced as an actress in the picture's opening credits.

Preminger had trouble securing funding for the picture and had to partially finance it with his own money. According to The Daily Telegraph obituary of casting director Rose Tobias Shaw, Preminger wanted to cast the novelist Jeffrey Archer in the role eventually played by Nicol Williamson. Archer, however, was much shorter than the 5-foot-9-inch (1.75 m) Iman, and failed his audition.

== Release ==
The film was the first acquisition by Metro-Goldwyn-Mayer in six years for distribution in the United States and Canada, through United Artists. The film was released for an Academy Awards qualifying run in Los Angeles as well in New York City.

== Reception ==
The film holds a 33% on Rotten Tomatoes, based on six reviews.
