= Richard Power (writer) =

- Born: 24 February 1928; Dublin, Ireland
- Died: 12 February 1970 (aged 41)
- Occupation: Novelist

Richard Power (Irish: Risteard de Paor; 24 February 1928, Dublin – 12 February 1970, Bray) was an Irish novelist and script-writer.

== Early life and education ==
Power was born on 24 February 1928 into a family of Waterford lineage and raised in Naas, Co. Kildare, where his father was a banker.

Educated locally in Naas, he moved to Dublin studying at both UCD and Trinity College Dublin and took two degrees, one in commerce and the other a dual external degree in English and Irish.

He entered the Civil Service in 1945 and was employed in the Department of Local Government. He married Ann Colvill in London in 1955, and they had 6 children together.

== Writing career ==
In 1958, Power's career began in teaching: from 1958 to 1960, he taught at State University in Iowa.

Power's Irish-language novel Úll i mBarr an Ghéagáin (1959) won the Gaelic Book Club (Club Leabhar) Award, which “described life on the Aran Islands and with Irish-speaking labourers in England” after he had spent a spell living with a family in Inis Oirr. After his death it was published in an English translation by his brother Victor Power as Apple on the Treetop (1980). In 1964 his novel The Land of Youth was published.

Power wrote poetry as well as one-act plays, Saoirse (Abbey 5 November 1955), and An Oidhreacht (Abbey 17 March 1958). He also wrote scripts for the Irish broadcaster RTE.

Power's most notable and critically acclaimed novel was The Hungry Grass (1969), which covered in close detail the last days of a village priest, Fr Tom Conroy.

He died suddenly, months after the publication of The Hungry Grass. His novel The Mohair Boys was unfinished at his death in Bray in 1970.

In 2016 "The Hungry Grass" was reprinted and hailed as a "forgotten classic of Irish literature" and "truly masterful" because of the "sympathetic glimpse into the inner life of Father Tom Conroy" a character of depth and complexity.

== Works ==
- Úll i mBarr an Ghéagáin (Baile Atha Cliath: Sáirséal agus Dill 1959) (also trans. by Victor Power as Apple on the Treetop (Dublin: Poolbeg 1980; ISBN 978-0-905169-30-9)
- The Land of Youth (New York: Dial Press 1964; London: Secker & Warburg 1966)
- The Hungry Grass (London: The Bodley Head 1969) ISBN 0-370-01413-8; (reprinted London: Apollo Library 2016) ISBN 978-1-78497-741-2
- ‘Poems translated from the Irish,' Poetry Ireland, 19 (October 1952), pp.7-8
- ‘Peasants: A Story,' The Bell, XVIII, 7 (Dec. 1952), pp.424-30
- ‘An Outpost of Rome,’ The Dubliner, Vol. 3, 1 (Spring 1964), pp. 14–26. See also extract from The Mohair Boys [unfinished novel] in The Irish Press (27 February 1971)
- Water Wisdom (award-winning short public service film, written by Power and directed by Colm Ó Laoghaire) (Department of Local Government, 1962)
