= The Honorary Consul =

1973 novel by Graham Greene

- First edition
- Author: Graham Greene
- Language: English
- Published: 1973
- Publisher: Bodley Head
- Publication place: United Kingdom
- Media type: Print (hardback & paperback)
- Pages: 335
- ISBN: 978-0-370-01486-9
- Dewey Decimal: 823/.9/12
- LC Class: PR6013.R44 H6

The Honorary Consul is a British thriller novel by Graham Greene, published in 1973. Greene called it "my favourite book, the one that bothers me the least." It is set at the run-up to Argentina's Dirty War in the early 1970s.

== Plot summary ==
The story is set in the provincial city of Corrientes, part of the Argentine Littoral, on the shore of the Paraná River.

Eduardo Plarr is an unmarried medical doctor of English descent who, as a boy, fled to Buenos Aires with his Paraguayan mother to escape the political turmoil of Paraguay. His English father remained in Paraguay as a political rebel and, aside from a single hand-delivered letter, they never hear from him again.

When Plarr moves to Corrientes, a quiet, subtropical backwater, he meets the two other English inhabitants: Humphries, a bitter elderly English teacher; and Charles Fortnum, the unimportant British honorary consul, a divorced, self-pitying alcoholic who abuses his position for gain. Plarr also meets Julio Saavedra, a forgotten but self-important Argentine writer of novels full of silent machismo.

Visiting the town brothel with Saavedra, Plarr is attracted to a girl, Clara, but she is taken by another man. Later, when he is called to treat Fortnum's new wife, Plarr recognizes Clara. Although he has never been to England, Plarr regards himself as a cool, self-controlled Englishman. Nonetheless, he finds himself obsessed by Clara and seduces her with a pair of highly decorative sunglasses. They then begin an affair in which he remains emotionally distant from her. "Caring is the only dangerous thing," Plarr says in the novel. "Love was a claim which he wouldn't meet, a responsibility he would refuse to accept, a demand. So many times his mother had used the word when he was a child; it was like the threat of an armed robber. 'Put up your hands or else ...' Something was always asked in return: obedience, an apology, a kiss which one had no desire to give." When Clara becomes pregnant Fortnum, believing the child is his, drinks less.

Two of Plarr's friends from his Paraguayan Jesuit schooldays turn up at his surgery. One is Leon Rivas, a married priest, now defrocked, the other Aquino, a failed lawyer. They tell Plarr his father is alive and in a jail in Paraguay, and that they have a plot for which a doctor's assistance is needed to kidnap the US Ambassador on his trip to Corrientes to see ruins. They intend to ransom the ambassador for the release of political prisoners in Paraguay, including Plarr's father. However, they are incompetent and mistakenly kidnap Fortnum instead. Meanwhile, Colonel Perez of the Federal Police questions Plarr on the kidnapping.

Rivas and Aquino take Plarr to a squalid hut in a shanty town while bargaining with the authorities. Plarr has been taken to the hut to treat Fortnum, who has been shot in the leg while attempting to escape, lies drinking whisky. Fortnum spends much of his time, as he faces up to his impending death, sentimentalizing about Clara and remembering the fearsome figure of his father. He overhears Plarr confessing his adultery with Clara and that the child is Plarr's. Army paratroopers surround the hut while the failed priest, Rivas, conducts a makeshift mass inside with the rain coming down. When the police deadline is about to expire, Plarr goes out to talk with them, with Leon shooting him in his leg. The paratroopers shoot Plarr, Leon and Aquino dead, with Plarr's death blamed on the kidnappers. The surviving kidnappers and Rivas's wife are captured, and Fortnum restored to Clara.

Plarr's mother, once a beauty and now bloated, along with some of his previous mistresses, attends his funeral. Saavedra reads a homily. The British Embassy then relieves Fortnum of his consulship and tell him he will be appointed an OBE in the next honours list. In the last scene, Fortnum and Clara reconcile and name the child Eduardo, after Plarr.

== Adaptation ==
The book was made into the 1983 film The Honorary Consul (also released as Beyond the Limit), directed by John Mackenzie, with Richard Gere as Plarr and Michael Caine as Fortnum. The soundtrack theme was composed by Paul McCartney and performed by John Williams.
