= Vivien Greene =

British writer (1904–2003)

- Born: Vivien Dayrell-Browning; 1 August 1904; Rhodesia
- Died: 19 August 2003 (aged 99); Oxfordshire, England
- Spouse: Graham Greene (m. 1927; sep. 1948)
- Children: 2

Vivien Greene (née Dayrell-Browning; 1 August 1904 – 19 August 2003) was a British writer regarded as the world's foremost expert on dolls' houses. She was the wife of the distinguished novelist Graham Greene.

== Early life ==
Vivien Dayrell-Browning was born in Rhodesia. As a child she spent her pocket-money collecting dolls' house furniture. She had a difficult childhood: her father had an affair and her mother left him, requiring Vivien at the age of fifteen to write him a letter ending their relationship. She published her first book The Little Wings, a collection of poetry and prose, when she was fifteen; it had an introduction by G. K. Chesterton, who was a family friend. She began working for Basil Blackwell when she was fifteen.

== Marriage, family and separation ==
Dayrell-Browning started a correspondence with Graham Greene in 1925. A staunch convert to Catholicism, she rejected his initial proposal of marriage because he was an atheist. Following his conversion, they married on 15 October 1927 at St Mary's Church, Hampstead, London.

The Greenes had two children, Lucy Caroline (born 1933) and Francis Hugh (born 1936). Graham left his family in 1947 and they formally separated in 1948, but in accordance with Catholic teaching the couple were never divorced and the marriage lasted until Graham's death in 1991.

== Dolls' house collecting ==
During World War II, Vivien and her children lived in Oxford after their home in London had been bombed. At a local auction she was charmed by a derelict Regency style doll's house which she bought for £5 and took home on the bus with her. As the war dragged on and her marriage disintegrated, she devoted herself to restoring and furnishing the doll's house. Materials were scarce; she recalled scraping off old paint and wallpaper with shards of broken glass. "I needed a hobby, the wartime evenings in the black-out were long and dark, so I started to furnish the house, to make carpets and curtains for it." She then began seeking out other antique dolls' houses and furnishings with her friend the historian A. J. P. Taylor researching their history, and restoring the houses, filling the Greenes' rented home with her miniature world.

After Graham had abandoned his family, she travelled the world to add to her collection, becoming a noted authority in the field of antique dolls' houses between 1700 and 1900 and their social history and craftsmanship. The earliest item in her collection was a William-and-Mary house built in oak in about 1690 in the shape of a cabinet, suitable to be displayed in a drawing room. Dolls' houses were initially created as a status symbol, built as a replica of the owner's home or as an ornament on a staircase landing. Only after the 1840s were they intended for children. After her children left home, Greene began a personal mission to view, draw and catalogue any historic dolls' houses she could discover before they, and the great English country houses in which they were found, disappeared in the postwar world. As many as possible she restored to their original grandeur, paying great attention to historical authenticity.

Greene's first book English Dolls' Houses of the 18th and 19th Centuries (1955) is credited with convincing dealers and museum curators that doll's houses were a serious field of study and required conservation. Her notes record 1,500 dolls' houses that she examined in North America, Europe and South Africa. In 1962 she even made the journey through Checkpoint Charlie to Communist East Germany to research the original plans of 19th century makers of miniature furniture based at Schloss Tenneberg, near Waltershausen, Thuringia.

In 1962 she built the Rotunda as a doll's house museum in the grounds of her home near Oxford, incorporating the spiral staircase from the St James's Theatre. The museum was partially funded by Graham Greene and opened by Sir Albert Richardson, who later donated a dolls' house. By the mid-1990s, the Rotunda contained over 50 miniature castles, cottages and manors, all furnished down to the last tiny piece of porcelain, dating from c. 1700 to 1886. The focus was specifically on the craftsmanship, and only children over sixteen years were allowed to visit on the monthly opening to the public. Her collection was auctioned by Bonham's in London in 1998 and 1999.

A cat lover, she was a supporter of the Protection of Tigers League.

== Death ==
Vivien Greene died on 19 August 2003 in Oxfordshire, at the age of 99.

== Publications ==
- The Little Wings: Poems and Essays (1921) (as Vivienne Dayrell)
- English Dolls' Houses of the Eighteenth and Nineteenth Centuries (1955)
- Family Dolls' Houses (1973)
- Laurel for Libby: A Story with Cuts (1991) (reprinted 2006)
- The Vivien Greene Dolls' House Collection (1995) (with Margaret Towner)

== See also ==
- Graham Greene
