= A Sort of Life =

1971 autobiography by Graham Greene

- First edition
- Author: Graham Greene
- Language: English
- Subject: Autobiography
- Publisher: The Bodley Head
- Publication date: 1971
- Publication place: United Kingdom
- Media type: Print (hardback and paperback)
- Pages: 216 pp
- ISBN: 0140185755

A Sort of Life is the first volume of autobiography by British novelist Graham Greene, first published in 1971.

== Overview of the book ==
This volume covers Greene's early life, from mundane childhood in Hertfordshire, through to school and university and on to his early working life as a sub-editor at The Times and his years as a struggling novelist. His memoirs have been criticized for being oddly impersonal and for brushing over his marriage and his conversion to Catholicism, especially as his faith was to become a powerful motif in many of his novels. Despite these omissions he deals frankly with the personal demons he faced in his teens, including an account of several suicide attempts, the resulting psychoanalysis his father arranged for him, and his brief fascination with Russian roulette.

== Key themes in the book ==
This is an autobiographical book that is short (190 pp in the 1973 pocket-book edition quoted below) and covers the early part of the author’s life, i.e. his childhood and his youth. It is written in a factual and detached style, but with great insight and, it seems, honesty; also, it is written with wit, irony and humor, ostensibly to bring “order” to the “chaos” of a life.

Among the themes covered, the book refers to English society (class prejudice); existential issues (dealing with one’s family, failure in life, coping with setbacks, revenge and bullying, false kindness, suicide and its allure, the quest for an adrenalin rush, the desire to prove oneself in life, extreme commitment in life, happiness, boredom, and loneliness); the life and travails of a writer of fiction (writing as a form of therapy and the posture of the novelist); psychoanalysis; education (including private education, boarding schools, private tuition and working as a private tutor, and university life); sex (the interest in sex in one’s teens); politics (Communism and patriotism); morality and ethics, as well as religion (Catholicism and faith); and journalism (and working as a sub-editor for a national newspaper).

Weirdly, there is little that is truly personal, let alone intimate, beyond the writer’s teen years; for instance, we do not learn anything about how or where or when he had his first sexual encounter. The quest for creativity (through writing, also seen as a form of therapy) and the fear of boredom (G Greene tended to depression right through his life) are 2 dominant themes.

== Description of the content of the book ==
The book starts with a description of life at Berkhamsted School, with the nearby village of Northchurch. The author dwells on his extended and influential family, which is like “a tribe”, as well as his parents; his father became headmaster of the school in 1910. G Greene’s childhood is set in pre-war (i.e. pre-WWI) England; it has a distinct Victorian flavor to it. It sounds closer to the 19th century than to the 20th. G Greene discusses his parents’ marriage and his decision to become a Catholic.

G Greene reminisces on stays with relatives in the countryside or by the coast, also for holidays; his parents seem remote: his mother because it is in her nature, and his father because he seems to feel he should maintain some sort of distance, being the head of the school where his son is a pupil. The author discusses his fears, as a child, dreams, and memories. He talks about his “ailments”, his interaction with domestic animals, as a child, and the games they played.

As a young boy, he has a fascination with war and the military: the rumbles of war (WWI) are perceived to be some exciting, heroic adventure. The “social conditioning” and regimentation of school life does not seem to suit G Greene, who dwells on it in some detail. He deplores the “social snobbery” and the “exaggerated interest in royalty”. He describes his various hobbies, including collecting stamps, coins, Meccano, collecting “cigarette cards”, and his interest in books. G Greene notes that “the influence of early books is profound”, more so than all “religious teachings” as such. He comments on poetry. G Greene evokes his “earliest sexual memories”, visits to London and more particularly Soho. He discusses his favorite holiday resorts (more particularly Littlehampton, which they often went to).

When he starts in prep school, it is a big change for G Greene; beatings feature; he hates gymnastics and physical activities. August 1914 comes and the war years follow – somewhat unreal and remote, insofar as war is concerned. The author starts practicing truancy on a regular basis in order to escape the tedious and authoritarian school routine: he hides in bushes near the school, by himself, reading, before heading home. He is now 13.

G Greene practices truancy with sophistication. He dwells on the “unhappiness in a child”, the “routine of the boarding school”, the scatology, and the “lavatory joke[s]”. He is subjected to bullying and “mental torture”, which makes him want to take revenge: this is described in detail, including the “desire for revenge”. These “years of humiliation” made him want to prove that he was good at something, conditioning him for the rest of his life, in fact.

G Greene notes that a suicide attempt is often “a cry for help”. In view of his unhappiness in boarding school, “his final breakdown” is caused by his hatred for the “ignoble routine of school”. A pitiful attempt at running away is short-lived but described in detail. But it brings about major changes, seemingly at the initiative of his father, who is concerned that his son may have been roped into a “masturbation ring” on the school’s premises! G Greene’s father is prompted to send his son to see a psychoanalyst – a daring thing to agree to in 1920.

Kenneth Richmond is to be G Greene’s analyst; G Greene is happy, if only because he feels free, in London, far from the school and its Victorian discipline. G Greene dwells on the psychoanalysis and the “dream diary” he has to keep. G Greene seems to have had a close relationship with the analyst, and to have appreciated his help; but the ‘transference’ goes awry when G Greene declares that he is besotted with K Richmond’s attractive wife, Zoe.

Boredom remains a great enemy and a constant fear, it seems (i.e. the fear of it). G Greene is now in the VIth Form. He experiences “sentimental fantasies”. He writes a play but it fails to stir any significant interest: this is revealing of his early interest in literature, but also how harsh that world is; it gives him an insight into failure in life. G Greene discusses literature and faith, referring to various authors, including Richard Browning. He notes the state of “extreme sexual excitement” that one goes through between 16 and 20. There follows his first taste of alcohol, in the form of beer.

When he goes up to Oxford (Balliol, 1922), the author says that he is wrapped up in “lust and boredom and sentimentality”, pining for a grand love affair that will sweep him off his feet. His flirtation with a governess (in her late twenties) turns into “an obsessive passion”: he meets her while teaching the children of a wealthy family (a student’s job). This fling leads to nothing concrete, from what we understand. G Greene oscillates between the “reality of a passion” and the “burden of boredom”.

Partly to escape boredom, he attempts suicide, playing at Russian roulette with a handgun on several occasions – incidents he describes in chilling detail; later, he notes, working as a journalist in war zones provided him with the danger and adrenalin that the games of Russian roulette had done – but in a way that could seem legitimate. The aim, he implies, was still the same, i.e. to court danger in order to escape from boredom, while seeking some sort of purpose in one’s life.

G Greene spends 10 days in Paris; his encounter with Communists leaves him deeply disillusioned. At Oxford, G Greene starts drinking heavily as a “distraction” from boredom and aimlessness. A series of bizarre contacts with the inter-war German Embassy starts after G Greene offered his “services” as a “propagandist” for Germany. At the time, he seems to have wanted some adventure and excitement and to have harbored some sympathy with the German position, post-WWI. An odd trip to Germany follows; G Greene seems attracted by the craft of espionage, more than anything else, but decides not to pursue it any further.

He now wants to find a “career”. He has various interviews with companies in the tobacco and oil industry. All of this having failed, G Greene ends up working as a private tutor for Gabbitas & Thring (“I had a horror of becoming involved in teaching”). After some tutoring, he ends up on an assignment in Nottingham, working for the local paper, the Nottingham Journal. G Greene mentions Vivien, his future wife, for the first time. He also dwells on religion, his focus being on Catholicism. G Greene is a reluctant believer, as he is, at first, a skeptic, but various priests have some influence on him and this leads to his first confession. He is 22 and “fresh from Oxford” at the time.

In parallel, G Greene plans or starts or actually writes various novels. When he lands a job on The Times of London as a sub-editor, however, he is happy. He now lives in Battersea. He talks about the General Strike of 1926. G Greene feels “accepted” at the newspaper – perhaps for the first time in his life. He is still writing novels and discusses the trade and psychology of the novelist: There is “a splinter of ice” in the writer’s heart (cf. incident of the child who died in hospital, witnessed by G Greene).

G Greene discovers that he may have been diagnosed with epilepsy when a young man, but was not told by his father. G Greene is now married, works at the newspaper, and writes his novels. But he remains restless: so long as he will not have managed to have a successful novel published, he will feel that he is living in failure and, unlike some of his peers, he cannot satisfy himself with that state of affairs; he will discover later on that having one ‘good’ novel published is not enough, as the second one may be as much of a struggle to produce, or more... G Greene dwells on having one’s first novel accepted by a publisher and the world of publishing.

Eventually, to focus entirely on his budding writing career, G Greene decides to resign from The Times; it is 1929 and he lived to regret it. At the time, he had been given an advance by a publisher to write a number of novels and felt his career as a writer was taking off and could be lucrative. As he was to realize, this was “a false start” in the wake of his first novel’s success. G Greene discusses his foray into literature at the time.

He adapts well to life in a village, on the edge of Chipping Campden: with his wife, they live in a house. Life in the Cotswolds has its interests, including colorful local characters described in some detail (the priest, the deaf architect, a “troupe of strolling players”, gypsies, tramps, pea pickers, rat catchers, the local madman...). But the advance paid to G Greene (three years) comes to an end and he has failed to produce a best-seller; there follow several pages on publishing and royalties. Mired in libel action and a sense of failure, G Greene feels that the “temporary nature of any possible success” is the lesson to be drawn.

The last two pages of the book discuss the nature of failure and success, in connexion with a writer’s career: the “lack of ambition” found in many of his peers leaves G Greene puzzled, even though “the unreality of his success” is a constant feature of a writer’s career and life. G Greene talks of a trip to Siam (now, Thailand) where he stayed with an old Oxford friend who had chosen a career in education and had given up on his youthful ambitions; he was content. They got on well and the last lines of the book are a quotation of the casual conversation they had at the time.
