= St Mary's Church, Hampstead =

- St Mary's RC Church
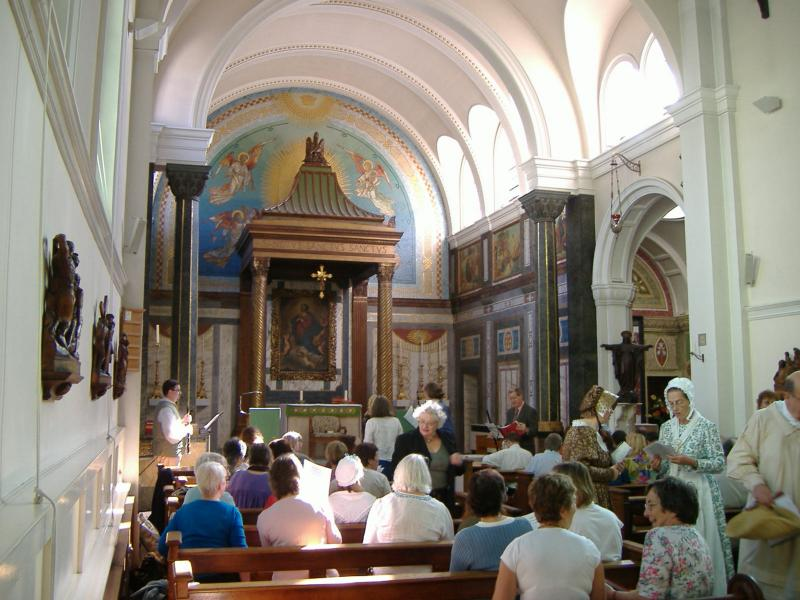
- WGMA Georgian Music Recital, Interior of St. Mary's Church

- St Mary's Location, Hampstead, Camden, London
- 51.556967°N 0.18045°W (Google Maps)
- Location: 4 Holly Walk; Hampstead, London; NW3 6QU
- Country: England
- Denomination: Roman Catholic
- Website: St Mary's Church Website

History
- Status: Parish church
- Founded: 1816
- Founder: Abbé Jean-Jacques Morel
- Dedicated: 17 August 1816

Architecture
- Functional status: Active
- Heritage designation: Grade II*
- Architect: William Wardell (1850s additions)

Administration
- Province: Westminster
- Archdiocese: Westminster
- Deanery: Camden
- Parish: Hampstead

Clergy
- Pastor: Monsignor Martin Hayes

St Mary's Church, formerly St Mary's Chapel, is a Grade II* listed Catholic church in Hampstead, London, England. It was founded in the early 19th century and is still in use today. English writer Graham Greene was married at St Mary's in 1927.

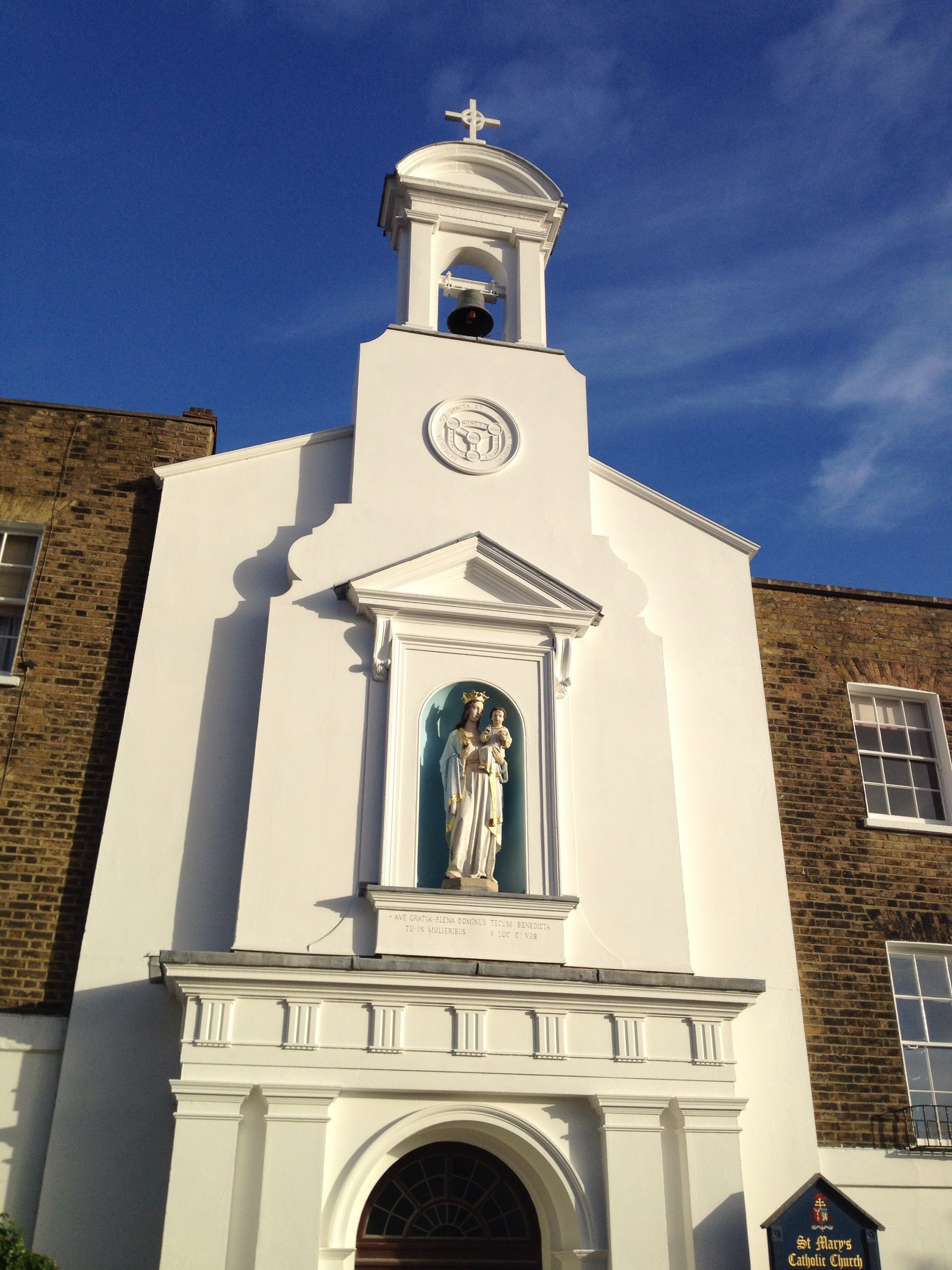
St Mary's Church, Hampstead, external façade

== History ==
St Mary's was the first Catholic church to be built in Hampstead after the English Reformation of the 16th century. The Abbé Jean-Jacques Morel, a refugee from the French Revolution, was its first pastor. The little chapel was completed in less than a year and opened its doors to worshippers for the first time in August 1816.

By this time with the final defeat of Napoleon, the majority of French refugees in Hampstead had returned to France and the congregation numbered about a hundred on a regular basis although these numbers were increased in the summer months by itinerant Irish hay-makers who worked in the fields around the village. Education was a priority for the Abbé Morel and he undertook the religious education of both boys and young women at several private Catholic schools in Hampstead. Sometime after the building of the chapel in Holly Place, two schools, one for boys and the other for girls, were set up next to the presbytery and was supported by subscriptions from wealthier parishioners.

St Mary's Church is located near the top of the hill at 4 Holly Place on Holly Walk, nestled in a row of Georgian houses between Church Row and Mount Vernon. No taller than houses numbered 4 and 5 to either side, the church's distinctive façade with bell tower and statue of Virgin and Child was designed by architect William Wardell as the first addition to the original building at the time the law was changed to allow bells to be rung from Catholic churches in 1852.

The sanctuary is decorated with tile mosaics and the painting of the Assumption of Our Lady was a gift from one of the founders of the chapel, George Armstrong, on behalf of his only daughter Frances Hall. This painting can be seen in the earliest photograph of the interior dating from 1878.

In the 19th-century a school was built behind the church but demolished in 1907, the land being used to build the present-day sanctuary and side chapels. Considerable repairs were made to the presbytery (rectory) in 1978 so that the upstairs now houses the pastor and downstairs a parish centre. The church was closed during 1990 for major building repairs removing the ceiling to reveal the roof timbers that adorn the church today.

St Dorothy's Convent is nearby at 99 Frognal. Previously it was home to one of St Mary's more notable parishioners General Charles de Gaulle who lived there with his family for about a year during the Second World War. The Sisters of St Dorothy's organise CCD classes for children of the parish who are not attending Catholic schools. South of the Church, the buildings now at numbers 1 and 2 Holly Walk were part of the St Vincent's Convent and Orphanage in the 1800s and later expanded to take in numbers 3 and 4 (the current presybytery).

== Pastors of St Mary's Hampstead ==
Canon Jean Jacques Morel	1796–1852
Fr. John Walsh	1796–1852
Monsignor Vincent Eyre	1859–1871
Canon Arthur Purcell	1871–1900
Fr. Michael Fizgerald	1900–1907
Fr. Thomas Walsh	1907–1930
Fr. Francis Brown	1930–1941
Canon Joseph Geraerts	1941–1970
Fr. Francis Morall	1970–1987
Canon Michael Brockie	1987–2001
Canon Daniel Cronin	2001–2006
Monsignor Phelim Rowland	2006-2026
Monsignor Martin Hayes	2026-

== Names associated with St Mary's ==
- The original founders 1815–16 Joseph Lescher, Edward Whiteside, Richard Power, Lewis Raphael, John Kelly, John Lund, George Armstrong, James Coppinger
- James Vincent Harting 1820
- John Wright, Michael German, Robert Butler 1821
- Cornelius Patrick Sullivan 1822
- William Lund 1827
- Henry Whiteside 1831
- Marie Thérèse of France (19 December 1778 – 19 October 1851), the eldest (and last surviving) child of King Louis XVI of France and his wife, Queen Marie Antoinette, also known as the Duchess of Angoulême, was recorded as visiting the Abbé Morel in Hampstead on one occasion when in exile in England.
- Clarkson Stanfield (3 December 1793 – 18 May 1867), a prominent English marine painter who executed the portrait of Abbé Morel (the church's founder).
- William Wardell (1823–1899), a civil engineer and architect, Catholic convert and designer of the church's façade and belltower (added c.1852).
- Friedrich von Hügel (5 May 1852 – 27 January 1925), an influential Austrian Roman Catholic layman and religious writer who lived in Hampstead.
- Sir George Gilbert Scott lived at Admiral's House on Admiral's Walk denoted by a blue plaque and Adrian Gilbert Scott
- Graham Greene (2 October 1904 – 3 April 1991), the English author, playwright and literary critic. Married Vivienne Dayrell-Browning at St Mary's on 15 October 1927.
- General Charles de Gaulle (22 November 1890 – 9 November 1970), the French general and statesman who led the Free French Forces during World War II. He later founded the French Fifth Republic in 1958 and served as its first president from 1959 to 1969. He lived at 99 Frognal.
- Charles Forte, Baron Forte founder of the Forte Group, lived with his family in nearby Greenaway Gardens.
- Gino Masero (1915 -1995), a British-Italian wood sculptor who carved the statue of Christ which stands above the High Altar in St Paul's Cathedral. He carved St Mary's stations of the cross and the Christmas crib figures. He was born in Scarborough in 1915 and began his working life as a trainee chef at the Palace Hotel – Southend-On-Sea where his father was head chef. His artistic talent was recognised when he was asked to carve a block of salt for a table decoration. He regarded the commission to carve the Stations of the Cross as a turning point in his career.
- Michael Williams (9 July 1935 – 11 January 2001), an English actor who played both classical and comedy roles, and was the husband of actress Dame Judi Dench.
- John Moffatt (b. 24 September 1922, Badby, Daventry, Northamptonshire), an English actor and playwright, perhaps best known for his portrayal of Hercule Poirot on BBC Radio. John Moffat joined with Michael Williams and Dame Judi Dench in a gala performance in 1996 to raise funds for the major restoration of the church that took place in 1991–1992.

== Art and music ==
The church organ is a two-manual organ manufactured by Bishop & Son.

The choir rehearses hymns and psalms. Members of the public are welcome to join the choir in the organ loft.

Carved Stations of the Cross and Christmas Crib figures were executed by Gino Masero (described above).

== Visiting St Mary's ==
The church is normally open for visitors to come into the entrance not the main body of the church on Monday to Friday from 09:00 to 16:00. Mass is celebrated through the week at 09:30 on Wednesdays, Thursdays and Fridays and at 18:30on Saturday (confessions on Saturday from 17:45 to 18:15). Mass on Sunday is at 08:30, 10:00, and 11:30.
