= Ways of Escape =

1980 autobiography by Graham Greene

- First edition
- Author: Graham Greene
- Language: English
- Subject: Autobiography
- Publisher: The Bodley Head
- Publication date: 1980
- Publication place: United Kingdom
- Media type: Print (hardback and paperback)
- Pages: 309
- ISBN: 978-0671412197

Ways of Escape is the second volume of autobiography by British novelist Graham Greene, first published in 1980. The book concentrates more on the author's work than his life, blurring the line between the two.

== Overview ==
Ways of Escape is the autobiography of a writer rather than a man. Instead of recounting the details of his life he gives the histories of his novels. How they came to be written, what he had intended to convey in those novels and whether or not he believed he succeeded. He also details the sources of his characters and the ways in which he sought to disguise those characters in order to protect the originals. There are plenty of anecdotes detailing various escapades around the world, though the way Greene describes them it is as though he were struggling to stave off terminal boredom rather than merely have a good time. Sometimes mildly heroic, often seedy, with these stories of his life he describes his lifelong ennui, his frequent bouts of depression and his endless search for meaning in a life he often appears to view as meaningless. The reader is left with the impression that the author lived a very interesting and varied life but not a happy one.
