= A Burnt-Out Case =

1960 novel by Graham Greene

- First edition cover
- Author: Graham Greene
- Cover artist: Lacey Everett
- Language: English
- Genre: Novel
- Published: 1960
- Publisher: Heinemann
- Publication place: United Kingdom
- Media type: Print (hardback & paperback)

A Burnt-Out Case (1960) is a novel by English author Graham Greene, set in a leper colony on the upper reaches of a tributary of the Congo River in Africa.

== Plot summary ==
Querry, a famous architect who is fed up with his celebrity, no longer finds meaning in art or pleasure in life. Arriving anonymously in the late 1950s at a Congo leper colony overseen by Catholic missionaries, he is diagnosed – by Dr Colin, the resident doctor who is himself an atheist – as the mental equivalent of a 'burnt-out case': a leper who has gone through the stages of mutilation. However, as Querry loses himself in working for the lepers, his disease of mind slowly approaches a cure.

Querry meets Rycker, a palm-oil plantation owner, and a man of apparently earnest Catholic faith who does not accept his own nothingness and tries to amplify the relevance of Querry's presence in that country. Rycker's wife, a young and ill-educated woman, is absolutely bored with his prudishness and her own lack of freedom.

It is revealed that Querry is a famous architect, known throughout the world for his design and construction of churches – which he himself believes have been defiled by the religious occupants. Querry is persuaded to design and oversee a new building for the hospital.

An English journalist called Parkinson arrives at the village with the intention of writing a series of articles, to be syndicated in many European and North American newspapers, on the subject of Querry's perceived 'saintly' activities in the village, including a story of Querry rescuing his servant – an African mutilated by leprosy- who became lost in the jungle. However Parkinson also brings up Querry's past not only as an architect but also as a womaniser. It is revealed that Querry's former lover committed suicide, thus prompting his journey to the village (however his journey was not the result of feelings of guilt or grief, but rather the incident acted to magnify his growing loss of faith and vocation.)

When the first article is published and received at the village, Querry becomes angered by his portrayal, not only by Parkinson, but by Rycker whom Parkinson interviewed for the story. Querry travels to the provincial capital and on the way calls in to confront Rycker. Querry learns that Rycker's wife fears that she is pregnant and that her husband does not want a child (despite having refused contraception and having effectively forced her into sex numerous times). She tells Querry to ask Rycker for permission to travel to the capital Luc to see a doctor. Following a confrontation between Querry and Rycker, Querry leaves for Luc and takes with him Mrs. Rycker so she may visit the doctor, however neither of the two inform Rycker of her departure.

In Luc, Querry and Mrs. Rycker take rooms at the hotel. However, before going to sleep, Querry suspects that Mrs. Rycker is crying in the next room. When he investigates she informs him that she was actually laughing at the novel she is reading – one that would be banned at her home with the pious Rycker – and the two share a bottle of whisky. As Mrs. Rycker is going to sleep, Querry tells her a story which closely parallels his story: a man losing both faith and vocation. Despite the intimacy of the moment, the two never become physically involved.

The following morning Parkinson informs Querry that Rycker has arrived in Luc in pursuit of his wife and, upon discovering his wife's diary with an entry stating "Spent the night with Q", Rycker accuses Querry of having an affair. Querry, after briefly meeting Mrs. Rycker and learning that she is pregnant with Rycker's child, leaves Luc and returns to the village, where the construction of the hospital is nearing completion.

Days later Mrs. Rycker arrives at the convent near the village. She tells the sisters and priests that she has been having an affair with Querry and that she is pregnant with his child. When Querry visits her she admits to him in private that she is lying, and agrees that the two have never slept together. Still she says that since she thought of Querry while having sex with Rycker the child is his in the emotional sense (despite Rycker being the biological father). Moreover, she will not admit the truth to anyone else no matter how much Querry might suffer from it, as she wants to make Rycker divorce her. Querry is left with no option but to leave, thinking that he might have finally met someone as ruthlessly selfish as he himself used to be.

Father Thomas, the temporary supervisor of the village, becomes angry at Querry for bringing shame and sin upon the village (as well as damaging his image as saintly – despite strong objections to having such an image from Querry himself). Rycker arrives at the village and demands to see Querry, who has gone to stay in Dr. Colin's room for the night. Rycker begins to walk to Dr. Colin's stating that a court would never convict him, which troubles the priests – one of whom pursues Rycker to prevent him shooting Querry. Enraged, Rycker confronts Querry. While being accused of adultery, Querry laughs at the absurdity of being confronted the one time he is actually innocent. Rycker misinterprets the laugh as mockery, and shoots Querry dead.

Querry is buried in the village, while Rycker faces a probable acquittal due to acting in passion and in defence of his honour as a husband. Ms Rycker likewise is assumed to gain her divorce in the end.

== Dedication and literary intentions in novel ==
Greene dedicated A Burnt-Out Case to Docteur Michel Lechat, a medical doctor at a leper colony in Yonda in Africa (one of a number of such colonies Greene had visited in the Congo and the Cameroons, which had inspired his novel). In his dedication to Lechat, Greene writes: "Doctor Colin has borrowed from you his experience of leprosy and nothing else. Doctor Colin's leproserie is not your leproserie.... From the fathers of your Mission I have stolen the Superior's cheroots--that is all, and from your Bishop the boat that he was so generous as to lend me for a journey up the Ruki."

In reference to the characters in the novel, Greene writes: "It would be a waste of time for anyone to try to identify Querry, the Ryckers, Parkinson, Father Thomas--they are formed from the flotsam of thirty years as a novelist."

Commenting on his literary intentions in the work, Greene wrote that it was, "an attempt to give dramatic expression to various types of belief, half-belief, and non-belief, in the kind of setting, removed from world-politics and house-hold-preoccupations, where such differences are felt acutely and find expression." Drawing a comparison between a leper-colony doctor's work and that of a novelist, Greene adds: "A doctor is not immune from 'the long despair of doing nothing well", the same "cafard that hangs around a writer's life".

== See also ==
- Burnout (psychology)
