= Rumpole of the Bailey (short story collection) =

1978 book by John Mortimer

- First edition
- Author: John Mortimer
- Language: English
- Series: Rumpole of the Bailey
- Genre: legal
- Publisher: Penguin Books
- Publication date: 1978
- Publication place: United Kingdom
- Followed by: The Trials of Rumpole

Rumpole of the Bailey is a 1978 collection of short stories by John Mortimer about defence barrister Horace Rumpole. They were adapted from his scripts for the TV series of the same name.

The stories are:

- "Rumpole and the Younger Generation"
- "Rumpole and the Alternative Society"
- "Rumpole and the Honourable Member"
- "Rumpole and the Married Lady"
- "Rumpole and the Learned Friends"
- "Rumpole and the Heavy Brigade"
