= Regina v Rumpole =

Rumpole for the Defence
- First edition
- Author: John Mortimer
- Language: English
- Series: Rumpole of the Bailey
- Genre: legal
- Publisher: Allen Lane
- Publication date: 1981
- Publication place: United Kingdom
- Followed by: Rumpole and the Golden Thread

Regina v Rumpole is a 1981 collection of short stories by John Mortimer about defence barrister Horace Rumpole. They were adapted from his scripts for the TV series of the same name. The stories were:

- "Rumpole and the Boat People"
- "Rumpole and the Confession of Guilt"
- "Rumpole and the Dear Departed"
- "Rumpole and the Expert Witness"
- "Rumpole and the Gentle Art of Blackmail"
- "Rumpole and the Rotten Apple"
- "Rumpole and the Spirit of Christmas"

The collection also includes the novel Rumpole's Return. The collection was reissued in 1982 without that novel as Rumpole for the Defence.
