= Tottenham Court Road =

Major road in the London Borough of Camden

Coordinates: 51.5207°N 0.1345°W

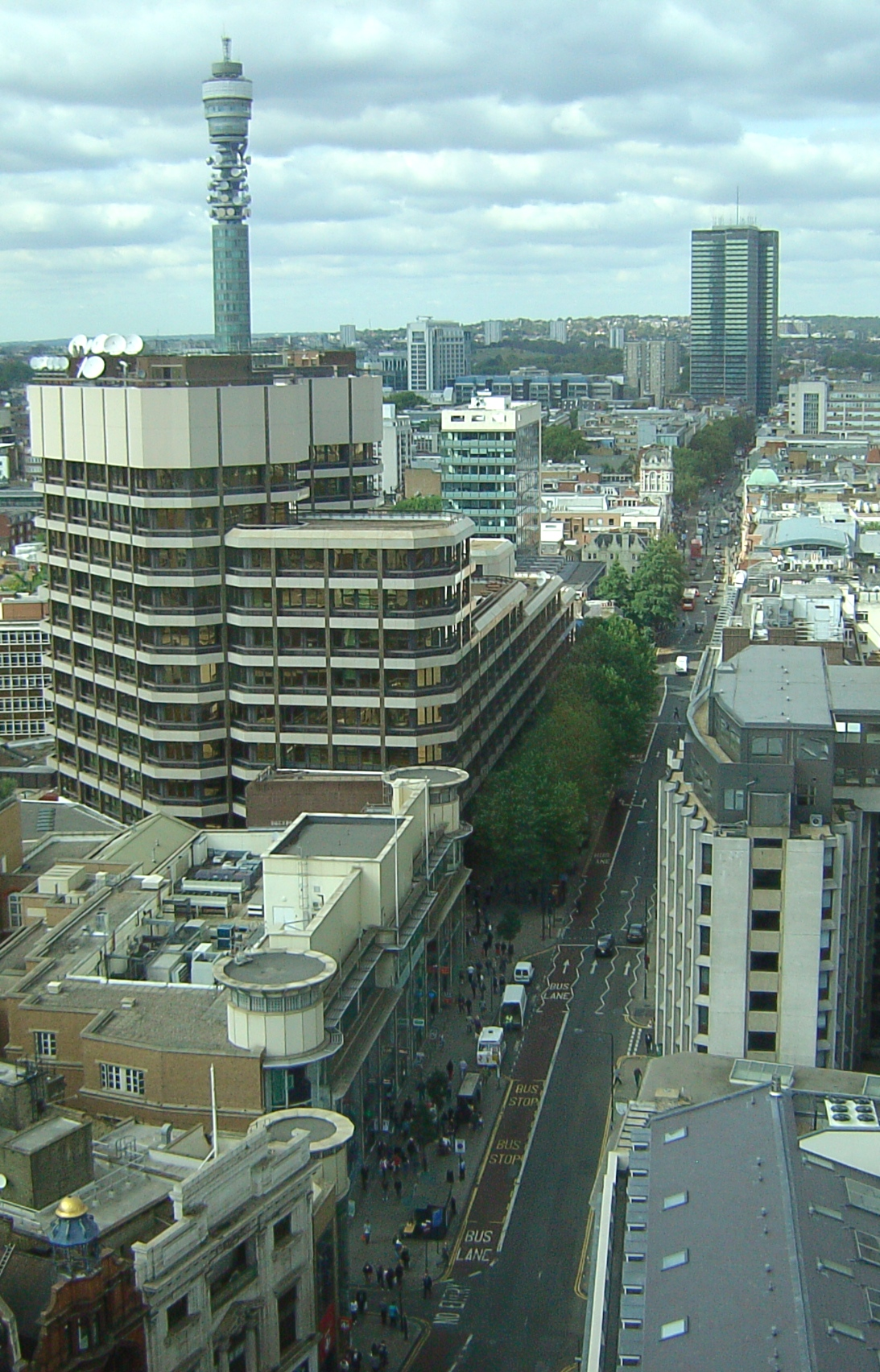
Tottenham Court Road in 2009, looking north from Amoco House (bottom left) to the road's northern end at Euston Tower (top right). The hills of Hampstead and Highgate, not visible from street level, can be seen on the horizon.

Tottenham Court Road (TCR) is a major road in Central London, almost entirely within the London Borough of Camden.

The road runs from Euston Road in the north to St Giles Circus in the south and the Tottenham Court Road tube station lies just beyond the southern end of the road. Historically a market street, it became known for selling electronics and white goods in the 20th century.

The street takes its name from the former manor (estate) – which was the location of a royal court at times – of Tottenham Court, whose lands lay toward the north and west of the road, in the parish of St Pancras. Tottenham Court had no direct connection with the district of Tottenham, which is now in the London Borough of Haringey.

== Geography ==
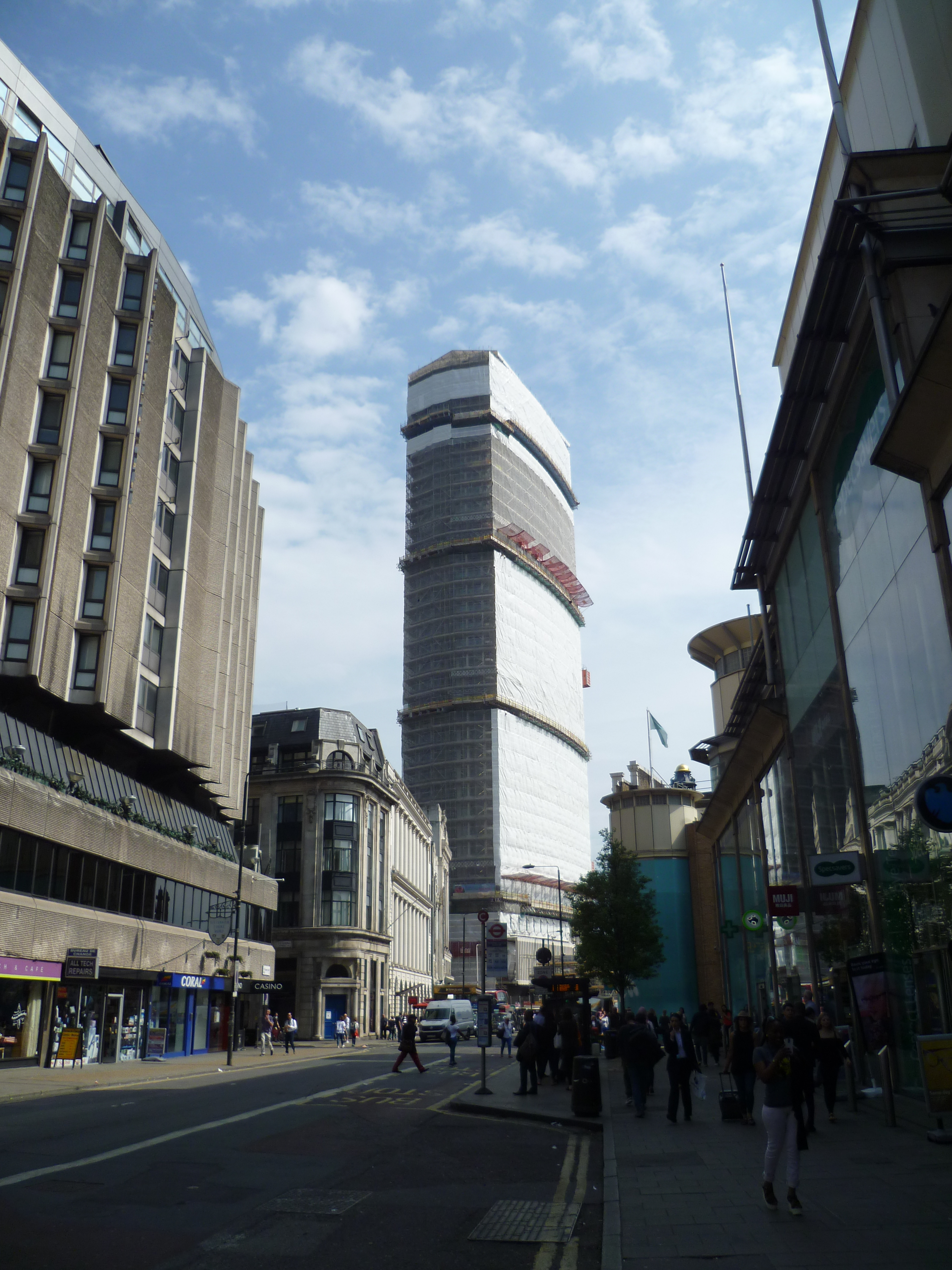
Tottenham Court Road looking south to Centre Point, 2016

Tottenham Court Road runs from Euston Road in the north to St Giles Circus (the junction of Oxford Street and Charing Cross Road) at its southern end, a distance of about three-quarters of a mile (1.2 km). The road lies almost entirely within the London Borough of Camden near its boundary with the City of Westminster.

South of Torrington Place (originally Francis Street) the road marks the traditional boundary of the parishes of St Pancras (of which the manor of Tottenham Court was part) to the west, and St Giles to the east (due to longstanding shared administrative arrangements, St Giles is often described as a part of Bloomsbury). North of Torrington Place, both sides of the road are in St Pancras.

The term Fitzrovia was first coined in the late 1930s as an informal description for some of the surrounding area. Tottenham Court Road is sometimes used to distinguish Fitzrovia to the west from Bloomsbury to the east (St Giles often being thought of as part of Bloomsbury). Fitzrovia has never had any formal limits applied, and its informal extent is sometimes also said to extend further east to Gower Street, thus potentially overlapping with the more formal definitions applied to St Giles and Bloomsbury.

The south end of the road is close to the British Museum and to Centre Point, the West End's tallest building. There are a number of buildings belonging to University College London along the road, and University College Hospital is near the north end of the road.

== History ==
The origin of the road's name is that it is the road to the Manor of Tottenham Court. The manor house lay just to the north of the road's junction with Euston Road.

=== Manor of Tottenham Court ===
The first surviving record of the manor is, as Þottanheale, from a charter from around AD 1000. The initial 'Þ' (pronounced 'th') may have been a mistake by the scribe, who should perhaps have used a 'T': all subsequent records use an initial 'T'. The manor was subsequently described as Totehele in the Domesday Book of 1086. The area was described as Totenhale in 1184 and Totenhale Court by 1487. Although the road's name has a similar word root to Tottenham in the London Borough of Haringey, the two are not directly related.

The March of the Guards to Finchley (1750) is set outside the northwest end of Tottenham Court Road

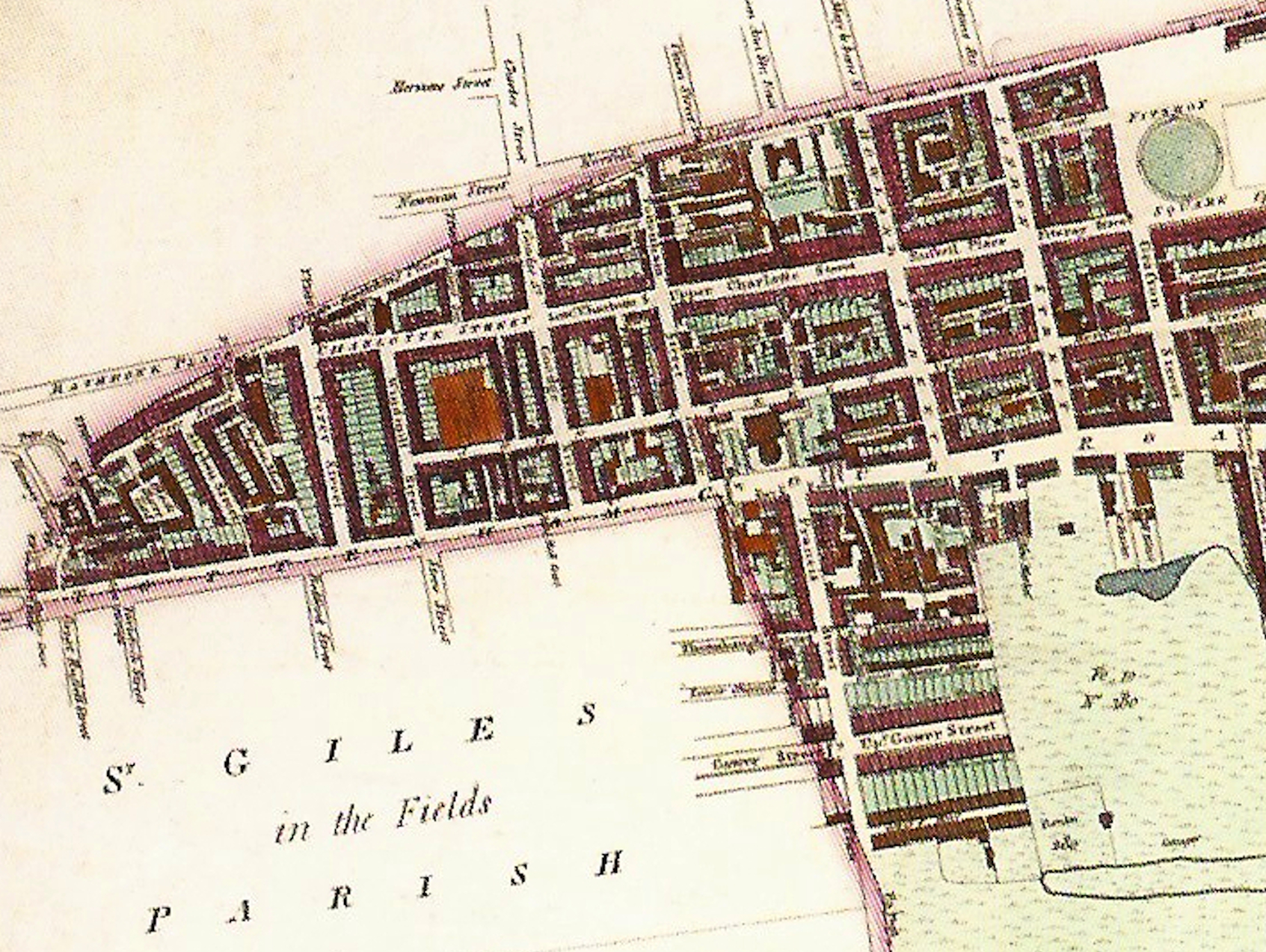
The Manor of Tottenham Court, now known as Fitzrovia, being urbanised in 1804. The Manor formed the south-west part of the parish and later borough of St Pancras. North is to the right-hand side.

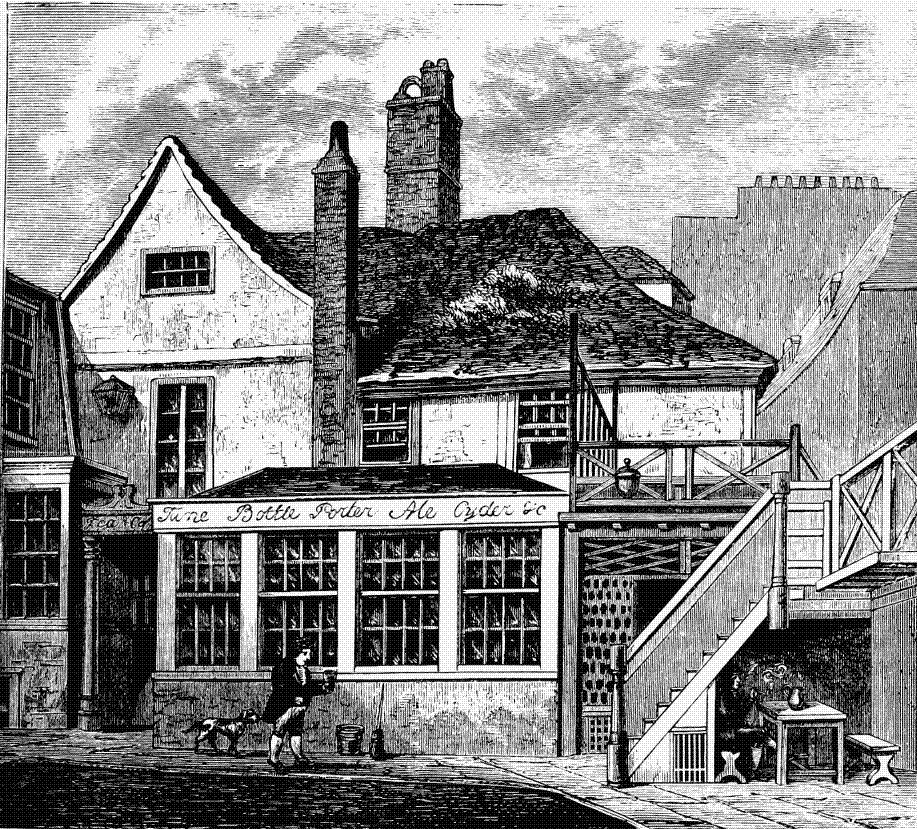
The manor house of Toten Hall, c. 1813

The manor occupied the south-western part of the parish of St Pancras, whose boundaries are now used to delineate most of the south-west of the wider modern London Borough of Camden, of which St Pancras is the principal component. South of Torrington Place, Tottenham Court (and therefore St Pancras) lay between Tottenham Court Road and what is now the borough boundary with the City of Westminster. North of Torrington Place, Tottenham Court (and hence also St Pancras) occupied both the east and west sides of the road. The manor house lay just to the north of what is now Euston Road (which was not built until 1756).

The manor is mentioned in the Domesday Book as belonging to the Dean and Chapter of St Paul's Cathedral. In the time of Henry III (1216–1272), a manor house slightly north-west of what is now the corner of Tottenham Court Road and Euston Road belonged to one William de Tottenhall. In about the 15th century, the area was known variously as Totten, Totham, or Totting Hall. After changing hands several times, the manor was leased for 99 years to Queen Elizabeth I, and it came to be popularly called Tottenham Court. In 1639, the land was leased to Charles I; following his execution ten years later, it was sold to Ralph Harrison.

It regained Crown ownership upon the Restoration of the monarchy, where it was given a 41-year lease to Charles II.

=== Urbanisation ===
The manor became the property of the Fitzroys, Dukes of Grafton, who built Fitzroy Square on a part of the manor estate towards the end of the 18th century. There was a manor house at the northwest end of the road, which subsequently became the Adam and Eve pub. This was demolished to build the Euston Tower.

Tottenham Court Road had become a place of entertainment by the mid-17th century. In 1645, three people were fined for drinking on a Sunday. A Gooseberry Fair was held sporadically throughout the century, and featured numerous booths with street entertainers.

The Horse Shoe Brewery was established in 1764 on the junction of Tottenham Court Road and Oxford Street. The current Horseshoe pub was built in the 19th century. Whitefield's Tabernacle was built in 1756 for the Reverend George Whitefield, and subsequently became the world's largest Methodist church after it was extended in 1760. It was rebuilt in 1857 after being destroyed by fire, and again in 1888 after the building collapsed. It was bombed during the Second World War and rebuilt as the Memorial Chapel.

Tottenham Court Road was predominantly rural in nature until well into the 19th century. When Heal's was established on former farmland, the lease stipulated there must be appropriate accommodation for 40 cows. These cowsheds were destroyed in a fire in 1877. A 17th-century farmhouse at the rear of No. 196 Tottenham Court Road was demolished in 1917.

=== Fairyland shooting range ===
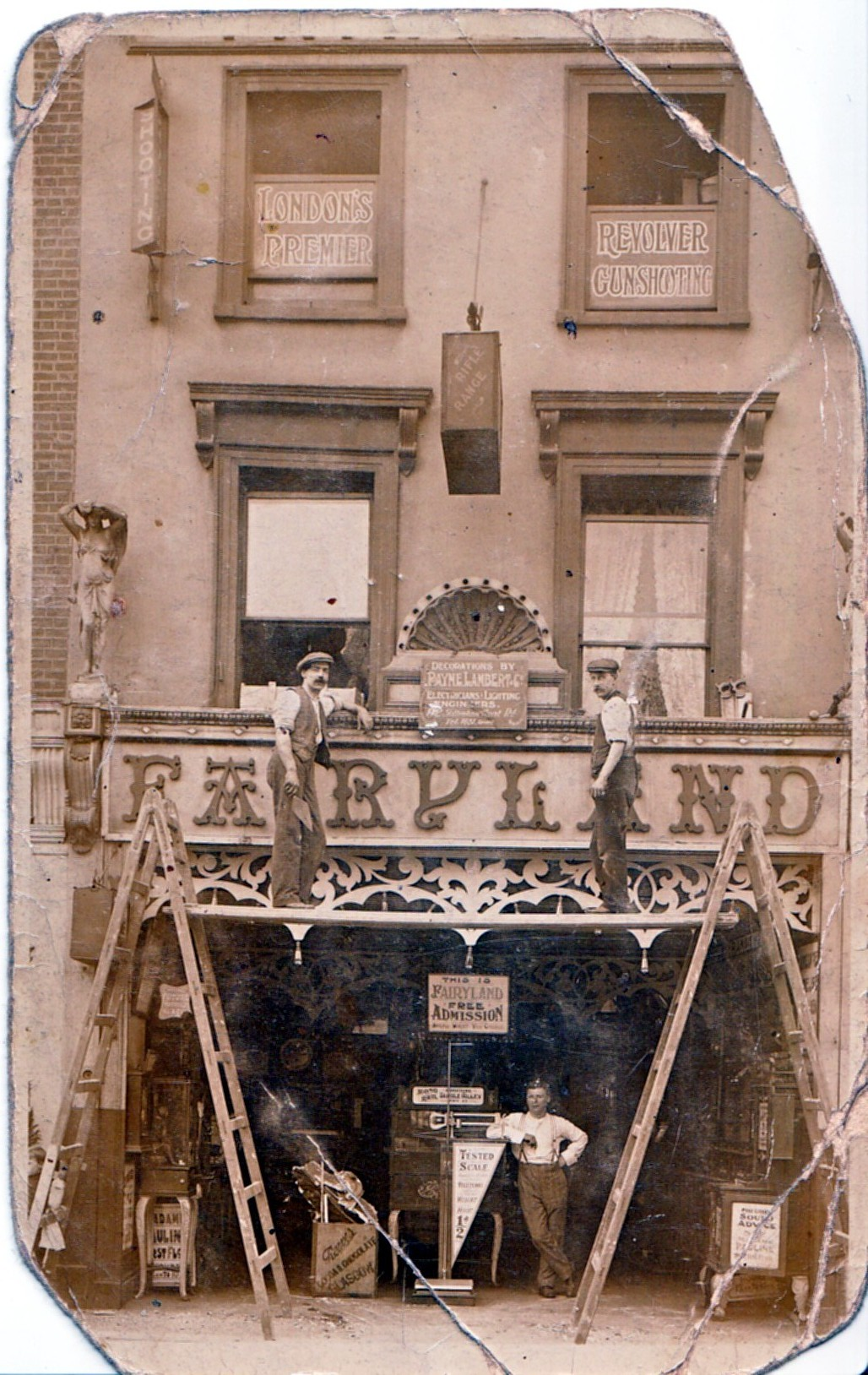
Fairyland, 92 Tottenham Court Road, circa 1905

During the period leading up to and during the First World War, an amusement arcade that contained a miniature rifle-shooting range called Fairyland was at No. 92 Tottenham Court Road. In 1909, Madan Lal Dhingra practised shooting here prior to his assassination of Sir William Hutt Curzon Wyllie. Other residents of India House and members of Abhinav Bharat practised shooting at the range and rehearsed assassinations they planned to carry out. Also in 1909, it was reported in a police investigation that the range was being used by two Suffragettes in a possible conspiracy to assassinate prime minister H. H. Asquith. It was also where Donald Lesbini shot Alice Eliza Storey. R v Lesbini (1914) was a case establishing in common law that with regard to voluntary manslaughter a reasonable man always has reasonable powers of self-control and is never intoxicated. The shooting range was owned and run by Henry Stanton Morley (1875–1916).

== Transport ==
The road was, for many years, a one-way street: all three lanes were northbound only; the corresponding southbound traffic used the parallel Gower Street, to the east. The new two-way traffic flows on Tottenham Court Road and the surrounding streets were fully completed in March 2021.

The road is served by three stations on the London Underground—from south to north these are Tottenham Court Road, Goodge Street and Warren Street—and by numerous bus routes.

The Elizabeth line, which opened in 2022, is expected to increase passenger traffic at Tottenham Court Road station by 40 per cent.

On 3 June 2014, Camden Council announced plans to reserve the road for buses and bicycles only, during daylight hours from Monday to Saturday. The council claimed it would make the street safer and boost business ahead of the opening of the new Elizabeth line station. The current one-way system would be replaced with two-way traffic flows. Wider pavements, cycle lanes and safer pedestrian crossings would also be installed as part of the £26m plan. As of spring 2019, Tottenham Court Road has been two-way, with buses, cycles and motorbikes permitted to use the southbound road towards the junction towards (New) Oxford Street.

== Economy ==
=== Entertainment ===
The Dominion Theatre opened in 1929, on the site of the old Horseshoe Brewery on Tottenham Court Road. It became a cinema in 1932, before reverting to being a theatre. It has a capacity of 2,000. The UK flagship location of the Spearmint Rhino is located in this street.

=== Retail ===
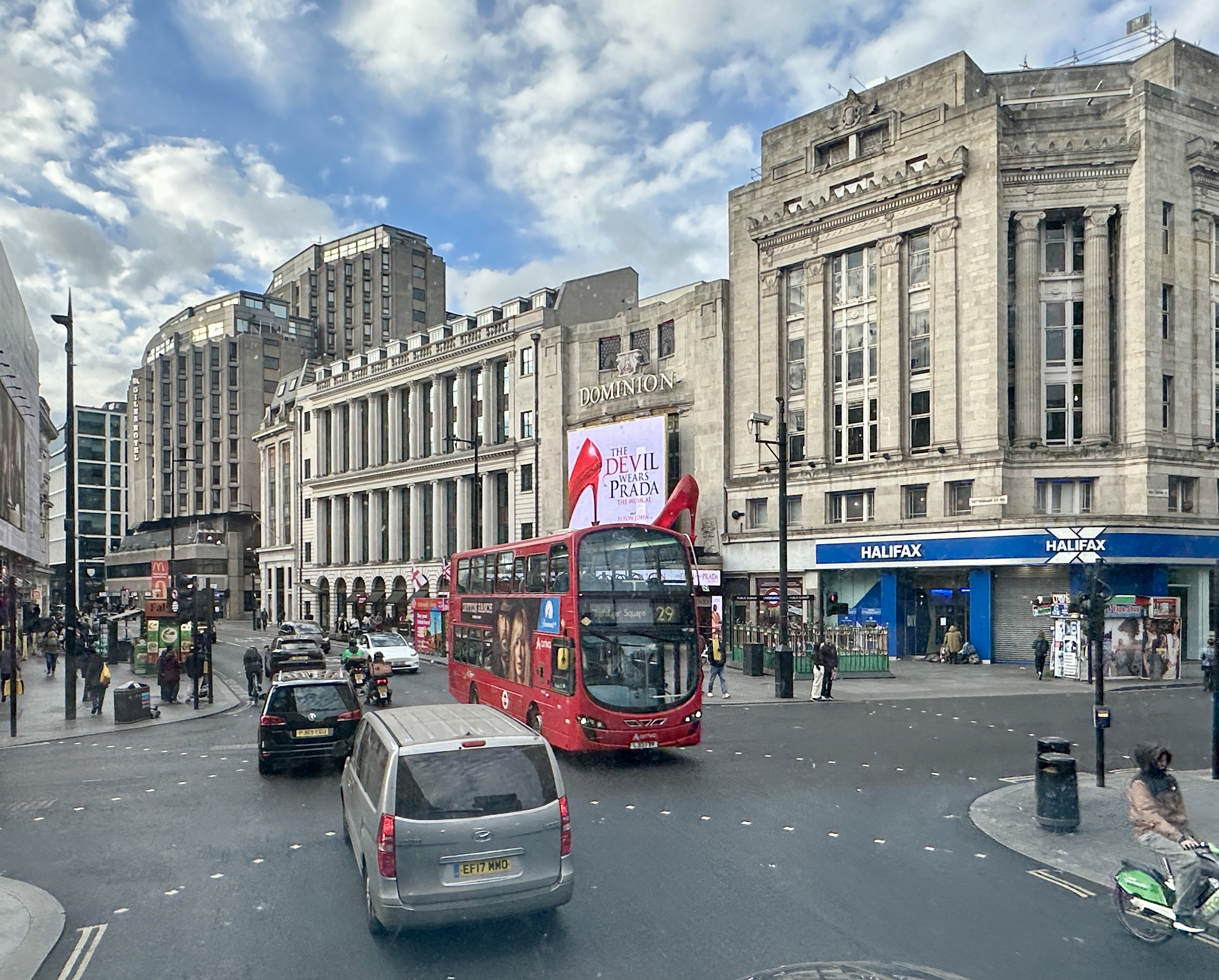
Tottenham Court Road at the intersection with New Oxford Street. The Dominion Theatre is visible above the bus.

Tottenham Court Road is a significant shopping street, best known for its high concentration of consumer electronics shops, which range from shops specialising in cables and computer components to those dealing in package computers and audio-video systems. Further north there are several furniture shops, including Habitat and Heal's. Another well-known store was the furniture maker Maple & Co.

In the 1950s and 1960s, Tottenham Court Road and a few of the adjoining streets became well known for stores selling Second World War surplus radio and electronics equipment and all kinds of electro-mechanical and radio parts. Shops such as Proops Brothers (established in 1946) lined both sides of the road at that time. By the 1960s they were also selling Japanese transistor radios, audio mixers and other electronic gadgets. Many British-made valve stereos were offered too.

In the early twenty-first century, the growth of e-commerce has reduced the importance of electronics retailing in the area, and cafes and fashion stores like Primark have become more prevalent.

Whilst Tottenham Court Road still has some specialist furniture and electronics retailers, it is becoming more of a general business district. However, some of the original electronics stores on Tottenham Court Road still trade, such as House of Computers, well-known in the area for offering a range of computers and accessories.

== Whitfield Gardens ==
Opposite Habitat and Heal's is a small public open space called Whitfield Gardens, occupying the former site of a chapel. On the side of a house is a painting, the "Fitzrovia Mural", which is about 20 metres (over 60 feet) high and shows many people at work and at leisure. It was painted in 1980 in a style resembling that of Diego Rivera. The mural has suffered from neglect and has been daubed with graffiti. There is a proposal to restore the mural after the current works to renovate the gardens are completed. In 2005, 12 so-called "Our Glass" panels were erected in the gardens. Each is about five feet (1.5 m) high, with two sides showing a collage of people associated with the area, from satirical cartoonist William Hogarth to the popular singer Boy George. There is a 13th panel showing an index of the people depicted.

== In popular culture ==
=== Art ===
William Hogarth's painting The March of the Guards to Finchley is set outside the Adam and Eve at the northwest end of Tottenham Court Road.

=== Music ===
Pink Floyd played many early concerts at the UFO Club at 31 Tottenham Court Road, where they were the house band. The road is referred to in the lyrics of Underworld's Born Slippy .NUXX. The Kinks reference the road in their 1970 song "Denmark Street".

The Pogues mention Tottenham Court Road in the 1984 song "Transmetropolitan", written by Shane MacGowan.

David Gray references Tottenham Court Road in the song "Everytime" on his 1996 album Sell, Sell, Sell.

=== Books ===
Tottenham Court Road is mentioned in many works of fiction. It is featured briefly in Harry Potter and the Deathly Hallows by J.K. Rowling when Harry and his friends are escaping from Death Eaters; in Robert Golbraith's CB Strike mystery series it is featured in the first five novels; in Diana Gabaldon's novel The Fiery Cross (Outlander series) it is featured in character Roger McKenzie's flashback/forward of 1960s London; in The Woman in White by Wilkie Collins; in Mrs. Dalloway by Virginia Woolf; in Postern of Fate by Agatha Christie; in Pygmalion by George Bernard Shaw; and in Saturday and Atonement by Ian McEwan.

It is also mentioned in several Sherlock Holmes stories by Sir Arthur Conan Doyle; in the Saki story "Reginald on Christmas Presents"; several stories by John Collier; in A Room with a View by E.M. Forster; in The London Eye Mystery by Siobhan Dowd; in The Late Mr Elvesham and The Invisible Man by H. G. Wells; in The Wish House by Celia Rees; in the short story "Rumpole and the Judge's Elbow" from the book Rumpole's Last Case by John Mortimer; in a The Matrix-based story, "Goliath", by Neil Gaiman. It features often in novels by Mark Billingham and in The Lonely Londoners by Sam Selvon. Sherlock Holmes once said that he purchased his Stradivarius from "a Jew broker in the Tottenham Court Road".

=== Films ===
It is mentioned briefly as the location where 'I' was allegedly arrested for 'toilet trading' in the 1986 Bruce Robinson cult-classic movie Withnail and I. In My Fair Lady, Mrs. Eynsford-Hill, Freddy's mother, lives in Tottenham Court Road. Also, Tottenham Court Road tube station is where one person becomes victim to the werewolf's rampage in An American Werewolf In London.

=== Musicals ===
In the Lerner-Loewe musical My Fair Lady, Tottenham Court Road is mentioned as the place where Eliza Doolittle sells her flowers.

Andrew Lloyd Webber's musical Cats references the area in the song "Grizabella the Glamour Cat", the lyrics coming from an unpublished poem fragment by T. S. Eliot.

Tottenham Court Road station was replicated as part of the set for the Queen musical We Will Rock You, which played at the Dominion Theatre between 2002 and 2014, directly above the actual Underground station.
