= Rumpole and the Golden Thread =

1983 book by John Mortimer

- Author: John Mortimer
- Language: English
- Series: Rumpole of the Bailey
- Genre: legal
- Publication date: 1983
- Publication place: United Kingdom
- Followed by: Rumpole's Last Case

Rumpole and the Golden Thread is a 1983 collection of short stories by John Mortimer about defence barrister Horace Rumpole. They were adapted from his scripts for the TV series of the same name. The stories were:

- "Rumpole and the Female of the Species"
- "Rumpole and the Genuine Article"
- "Rumpole and the Golden Thread"
- "Rumpole and the Last Resort"
- "Rumpole and the Old Boy Net"
- "Rumpole and the Sporting Life"
