= The Trials of Rumpole =

- First edition
- Author: John Mortimer
- Language: English
- Series: Rumpole of the Bailey
- Genre: legal
- Publisher: Penguin Books
- Publication date: 1979
- Publication place: United Kingdom
- Followed by: Rumpole's Return

The Trials of Rumpole is a collection of short stories by John Mortimer adapted from scripts for his TV series about Horace Rumpole.

The stories are:

- "Rumpole and the Man of God"
- "Rumpole and the Showfolk"
- "Rumpole and the Fascist Beast"
- "Rumpole and the Case of Identity"
- "Rumpole and the Course of True Love"
- "Rumpole and the Age for Retirement"
