= Rumpole on Trial =

Short stories by John Mortimer

- Cover of the first edition
- Author: John Mortimer
- Language: English
- Series: Rumpole of the Bailey
- Publisher: Viking Press
- Publication date: 1992
- Publication place: United Kingdom
- Media type: Print
- Followed by: Rumpole And the Angel of Death

Rumpole on Trial is a collection of short stories by John Mortimer about defence barrister Horace Rumpole. They were adapted from his scripts for the TV series of the same name. The stories were:

- "Rumpole and the Children of the Devil"
- "Rumpole and the Eternal Triangle"
- "Rumpole and the Family Pride"
- "Rumpole and the Miscarriage of Justice"
- "Rumpole and the Reform of Joby Jonson"
- "Rumpole and the Soothsayer"
- "Rumpole on Trial"
