= Rumpole and the Age of Miracles =

1988 book by John Mortimer

- First edition
- Author: John Mortimer
- Language: English
- Series: Rumpole of the Bailey
- Genre: legal
- Publisher: Penguin Books
- Publication date: 1988
- Publication place: United Kingdom
- Followed by: Rumpole a La Carte

Rumpole and the Age of Miracles is a 1988 collection of short stories by John Mortimer about defence barrister Horace Rumpole. They were adapted from his scripts for the TV series of the same name. The stories were:

- "Rumpole and Portia"
- "Rumpole and the Age of Miracles"
- "Rumpole and the Barrow Boy"
- "Rumpole and the Bubble Reputation"
- "Rumpole and the Chambers Party"
- "Rumpole and the Quality of Life"
- "Rumpole and the Tap End"
