= Rumpole Rests His Case =

2002 book by John Mortimer

Rumpole Rests his Case
- First edition
- Author: John Mortimer
- Language: English
- Series: Rumpole of the Bailey
- Genre: legal
- Publisher: Viking Press
- Publication date: 2002
- Publication place: United Kingdom

Rumpole Rests His Case is a 2002 collection of new short stories by John Mortimer about defence barrister Horace Rumpole. The stories were freshly written and not adapted from any previous scripts he had written for the Rumpole TV series (1978–1992).

The stories were:

- Rumpole and the Old Familiar Faces
- Rumpole and the Remembrance of Things Past
- Rumpole and the Asylum Seekers
- Rumpole and the Camberwell Carrot
- Rumpole and the Actor Laddie
- Rumpole and the Teenage Werewolf
- Rumpole Rests His Case
