= Rumpole and the Penge Bungalow Murders =

Book by John Mortimer

- First edition
- Author: John Mortimer
- Language: English
- Series: Rumpole of the Bailey
- Genre: Legal
- Publisher: Viking Press
- Publication date: 2004
- Publication place: United Kingdom

Rumpole and the Penge Bungalow Murders is a 2004 novel by John Mortimer about defence barrister Horace Rumpole. It describes the events of the Penge Bungalow Murders, a case frequently referred to by Rumpole in earlier stories. It also includes a description of how Rumpole first met Hilda and agreed to marry her, and how he first encountered the Timson family, who were to provide him with so much work as a defence counsel over the years. It was not based on a script, unlike many of the earlier stories.
