= Rumpole a La Carte =

1990 book by John Mortimer

- First edition
- Author: John Mortimer
- Cover artist: Christopher Green
- Language: English
- Series: Rumpole of the Bailey
- Genre: Legal
- Publisher: Viking Press
- Publication date: 1990
- Publication place: United Kingdom
- Followed by: Rumpole on Trial

Rumpole a La Carte is a 1990 collection of short stories by John Mortimer about defence barrister Horace Rumpole. They were adapted from his scripts for the TV series of the same name. The stories were:

- "Rumpole à la Carte"
- "Rumpole and the Quacks"
- "Rumpole and the Right to Silence"
- "Rumpole and the Summer of Discontent"
- "Rumpole at Sea"
- "Rumpole for the Prosecution"
