= Stephen Greif =

British actor (1944–2022)

- Born: Stephen John Greif; 26 August 1944; Sawbridgeworth, Hertfordshire, England
- Died: 23 December 2022 (aged 78)
- Education: Sloane Grammar School; Royal Academy of Dramatic Art
- Occupation: Actor
- Years active: 1968–2022
- Known for: Blake's 7; Citizen Smith; Casanova; Shoot on Sight
- Spouse: Judith Price (m. 1980, divorced)
- Children: 2
- Website: www.stephengreif.com

Stephen John Greif (/ɡraɪf/; 26 August 1944 – 23 December 2022) was an English actor known for his roles as Travis in Blake's 7, Harry Fenning in three series of Citizen Smith, Signor Donato in Casanova and Commander John Shepherd in Shoot on Sight.

== Early life ==
Greif was born in Sawbridgeworth, Hertfordshire, England, in a building originally belonging to Anne Boleyn as a gift from King Henry VIII. Greif was the son of Pauline (née Rubinstein) and Franz Greif. He was of Polish, Russian and Hungarian Jewish descent. He was educated at Sloane Grammar School, where he was school champion in athletics and swimming, and represented the school and the county in athletics at the White City Stadium amongst other venues. He briefly attended the Regent Street Polytechnic before entering a variety of jobs, including troubleshooter at a TV and radiogram manufacturer and as a negotiator in a boutique West End estate agency, before applying for drama school.

== Career ==
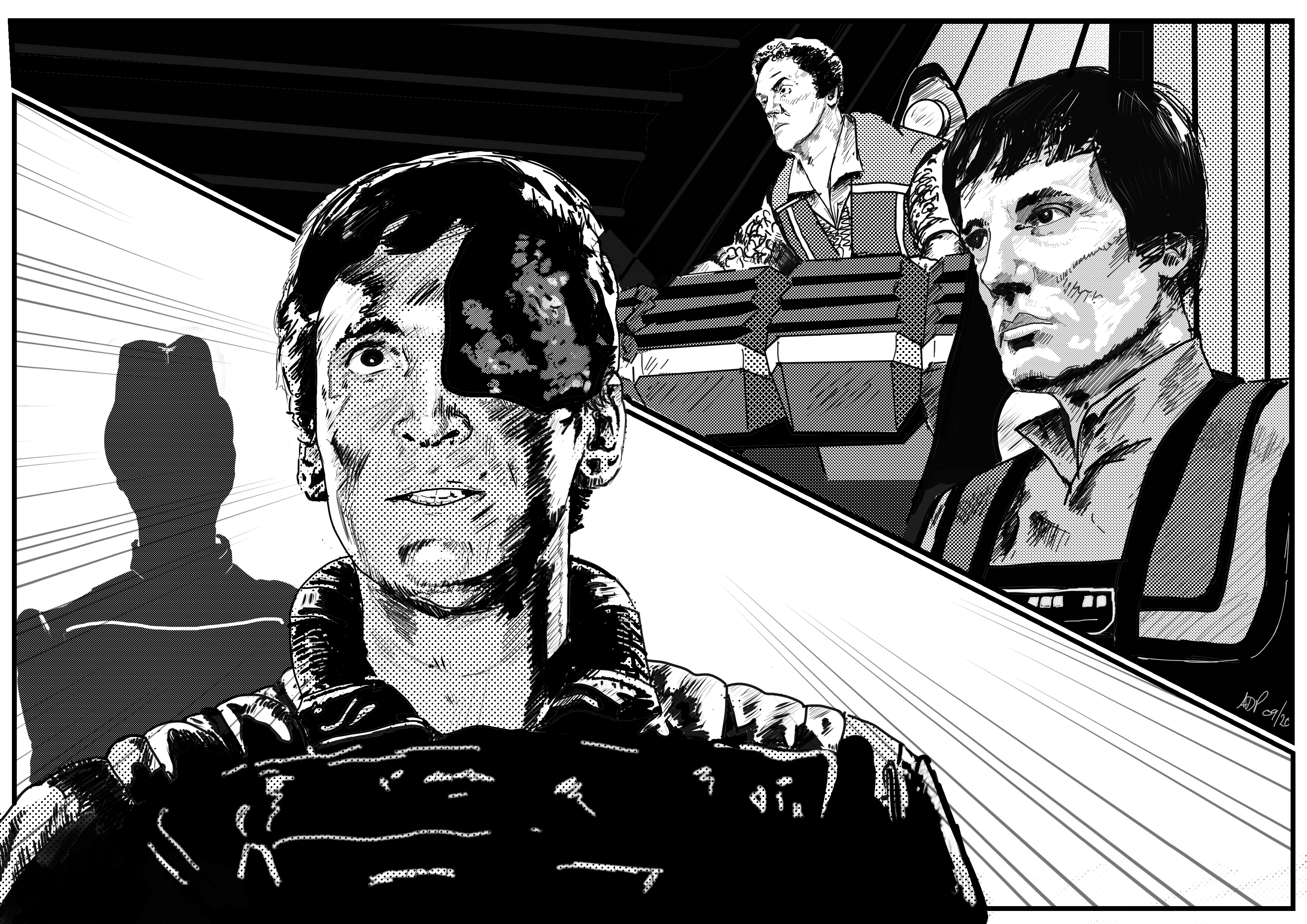
Drawing of Greif (left) as Travis in Blake's 7

Greif was an honours graduate of the Royal Academy of Dramatic Art, where he won numerous awards including Best Actor and Most Promising Actor, and was an Associate Member and served on the audition panel. He was a member of the National Theatre Company both at the Old Vic in Laurence Olivier's company and on the South Bank for Peter Hall's company. Among the productions he appeared in were Danton's Death, A Woman Killed with Kindness, The Merchant of Venice (with Olivier), Long Day's Journey into Night (again with Olivier), The School for Scandal, Richard II, The Front Page and Macbeth.

Greif was invited back to appear with them at Queen's Theatre in the West End in the Italian comedy Saturday, Sunday, Monday, directed by Franco Zeffirelli and Laurence Olivier, where he won a Best Actor nomination in the Critics' Circle Theatre Award. Later, he was invited to join the National again on the South Bank under Peter Hall in the revival of Death of a Salesman, directed by Michael Rudman and with Warren Mitchell winning himself another Best Actor nomination in the Olivier Awards. Grief was back again at the invitation of Nicholas Hytner to join his inaugural season appearing in His Girl Friday, Edmund and the Christmas production His Dark Materials. He acted alongside Elaine Stritch in The Gingerbread Lady, Denholm Elliott in The Paranormalist, Frank Langella in Abracadaver, Albert Finney in Ronald Harwood's Reflected Glory, Felicity Kendal and Frances de la Tour in Fallen Angels, Joseph Fiennes in George Dillon and Lesley Manville in Six Degrees of Separation. He appeared in three plays by his friend Bernard Kops, an East End playwright and poet, at the Jewish Museum, the JW3 and the National Portrait Gallery to celebrate the author's 85th and 90th birthdays.

From 2016 to 2018, together with Fenella Fielding, Greif appeared at Crazy Coqs at Zedel's Brasserie on multiple occasions, and various other venues in David Stuttard's adaptation of drama and comedy from famous ancient Greek literature called Tears, Treachery..and Just a little Murder produced by Simon McKay. The production was revived in 2020/21, with Dame Sian Phillips replacing Fielding, and retitled Savage Beauty, playing again at Crazy Coqs with further shows to come, this time entitled Lovers, Traitors...and bloody Greeks.

Greif appears in many films including Gerry, Risen, Woman in Gold, Bill, D is for Detroit, Lasse Hallström's Casanova, Shoot on Sight, Eichmann, Spartan, The Upside of Anger, Boogie Woogie and Fakers. His many television appearances include Only When I Laugh, Thriller (1 episode, 1976), Howard's Way, Spooks, Mistresses, He Kills Coppers, Silent Witness, the last story of Waking the Dead, The Crown, The Alienist: Angel of Darkness, Doctors and New Tricks.

Greif reprised his Blake's 7 role of Travis from season 1 of the TV series in eleven new audio stories for Big Finish Productions. He voiced Raymond Maarloeve in the video game The Witcher. He voiced and was nominated for best narrator for Sony's PlayStation video game Puppeteer in addition to many more games and cartoon series including Elliott from Earth for the Cartoon Network.

Greif won the BBC audio books of America award for narrating The Boy with the Magic Numbers by Sally Gardner. He also narrated various documentaries on Channel 5, and in 2021 contributed to and participated in the documentary tribute Alfred Burke is Frank Marker.

== Personal life and death ==
Greif enjoyed golf, and was a member and past President of the Stage Golfing Society. He married in 1980; the marriage produced twin sons in 1982. He resided near Richmond in London.

Greif died on 23 December 2022, aged 78.

== Filmography ==
=== Television ===
Year	Title	Role	Notes
1967	Boy Meets Girl	Dinner Guest	Episode: "A High-Pitched Buzz" Uncredited
1970	The Tragedy of King Richard II	Thomas Mowbray, Duke of Norfolk Welsh Captain	Television film
1970	Edward II	Earl of Pembroke Abbot of Neith	Television film
1971	The Persuaders!	Krilov	Episode: "The Man in the Middle"
1971	Eyeless in Gaza	Young Englishman	Episode: "And Calm of Mind, All Passion Spent"
1973	The Merchant of Venice	Prince of Morocco	Television film
1973	The Protectors	Policeman at Cafe	Episode: "Implicado"
1970–1974	Special Branch	Finch Mikhali Joanides	2 episodes
1974	A Little Bit of Wisdom	Jacques	Episode: "The Magic Monkey of Kubla Khan"
1974	The Aweful Mr Goodall	Doctor	Episode: "Indiscretion"
1974	Intimate Strangers	Harvest	Episode: #1.4
1974–1975	Thriller	Ben Kroom Tramp - Enrico	2 episodes
1973–1976	Dixon of Dock Green	DCI. Peter Basset Charles Negri Tony	3 episodes
1976	Killers	Stinie Morrison	2 episodes
1975–1976	Play for Today	Gerry Joe	2 episodes
1976	The New Avengers	Juventor	Episode: "Three Handed Game"
1977	Spaghetti Two-Step	Luigi	Television film
1977	Treasure Island	Job Anderson	4 episodes
1978	Armchair Thriller	Juan	4 episodes
1978	Blake's 7	Space Commander Travis	5 episodes
1978	Return of the Saint	Masrouf	Episode: "One Black September"
1978	The Sandbaggers	DCI Gomez	Episode: "The Most Suitable Person"
1978	Famous Five	Pottersham	Episode: "Five Have a Wonderful Time"
1979	Thomas & Sarah	Pocock	Episode: "The Vanishing Lady"
1979	Dick Turpin	Major Walther Von Gerhardt	Episode: "The Turncoat"
1979	Kids	David Newman	Episode: "Diana"
1977–1979	Citizen Smith	Harry Fenning	12 episodes
1979	Only When I Laugh	Nicos	Episode: "The Man with the Face"
1981	Goodbye Darling	Victor	Episode: "Lina"
1982	Minder	Spencer	Episode: "The Birdman of Wormwood Scrubs"
1982	Play For Tomorrow	Shapiro	Episode: "Bright Eyes"
1982	The Bounder	Count Montefiore	Episode: "The Rival"
1982	The Professionals	Dr. Lowe	Episode: "Lawson's Last Stand"
1983	The Cleopatras	Demetrius	Episode: "128 BC"
1983	Tales of the Unexpected	Rinaldo	Episode: "The Luncheon"
1983	Hart To Hart	Anthony Vlachos	Episode: "Passing Chance"
1984	The Last Days of Pompeii	Sporus	3 episodes
1984	Hammer House of Mystery and Suspense	Clifford Richardson	Episode: "A Distant Scream"
1984	Cold Warrior	Dr Mohammed Riffi	Episode: "The Man from Damascus"
1984	Ellis Island	Jesse Lasky	2 episodes
1984	Tolkien Remembered	Himself	Reader
1985	Dempsey and Makepeace	Bernie Silk	Episode: "Hors de Combat"
1985	One By One	Richard Neville	2 episodes
1986	Auf Wiedersehen, Pet	Prince Stefano	Episode: "For Better or Worse"
1986	Love with a Perfect Stranger	Andrea	Television film
1986	The Life and Loves of a She-Devil	Dr Ghengis	2 episodes
1987	Rumpole of the Bailey	Martyn Vanberry	Episode: "Rumpole and the Blind Tasting"
1987	Boon	Lomas	Episode: "Texas Rangers"
1987	C.A.T.S. Eyes	Jack Brand	Episode: "Backlash"
1987–1988	Bust	John Evans	2 episodes
1988	Howards' Way	John Reddings	Episode: "Crafty Ken"
1989	Laura and Disorder	Jim Lipthorpe	2 episodes
1989	Ticket To Ride	Capt. Szigismund	Episode: "South by Southeast"
1989	Young, Gifted and Broke	Colegate	2 episodes
1989	Chelworth	Tony Evrington	2 episodes
1989	About Face	Neville	Episode: "Mrs Worthington's Daughter"
1990	Face To Face	Grant Ross	Television film
1990	Zorro	Torres	Episode: "Ghost Story"
1990	The Gravy Train	Rudolph	2 episodes
1990	Rab C. Nesbitt	DI Sergeant	Episode: "Offski"
1990	Birds of a Feather	Marcus Green	Episode: "Falling in Love Again"
1991–1992	Dark Justice	Tony Hastings	2 episodes
1991–1992	Trainer	Stavros Mikhalides	5 episodes
1993	Drop the Dead Donkey	Valdez	Episode: "George and His Daughter"
1993	Comics	Anthony Fratelli	2 episodes
1993	The Upper Hand	Jason McCloud	Episode: "Wheel of Fortune"
1993	Between the Lines	Steven Ripley	2 episodes
1992–1994	The House of Eliott	Abraham Barak	2 episodes
1994	Red Eagle	Grigor	Television film
1994	Screen Two	Johnny	Episode: "Midnight Movie"
1995	Space Precinct	Eric Volker	Episode: "Two Against the Rock"
1995	Castles	Adam Robins	9 episodes
1995	Stick with Me, Kid	Gordon Lundey	Episode: "Cello Goodbye"
1995	Beyond Grief: The 'Moors Murders' Remembered	Himself	Narrator
1996	EastEnders	Brian Lassiter	2 episodes
1997	Crime Traveller	Leonard Gebler	Episode: "Sins of the Father"
1997	Engima	Voice (English version)	
1998	Killer Net	Harvey Levin	Episode: #1.3
1993–1998	The Bill	Neville Juke A.C. Lampriere	2 episodes
2002	Shackleton	Valiente	Uncredited
2002	Blitzkrieg	Himself	Television film Narrator
2002	The Concise History of World War II	Himself	3 episodes Narrator
2005	Holby City	Rabbi Ben Silver	Episode: "Days of Repentance"
2005	Space Race	Colonel Toftoy	2 episodes
2005	Road to Liberty: Battle of the Bulge	Himself	Narrator
2005–2006	Judge John Deed	Lorne Michaels	2 episodes
2005–2006	Sarah Jane Smith	Sir Donald Wakefield (voice)	4 episodes
2007	Totally Doctor Who	Gurney (voice)	2 episodes
2007	Doctor Who: The Infinite Quest	Gurney (voice)	13 episodes
2007	Working with Pinter	Himself	Television film
2008	He Kills Coppers	The Proprietor	Television film
2008	Spooks	Claude Denizet	Episode: "Accidental Discovery"
2009	Mistresses	Alexander	Episode: #2.3
2009	The Rise and Fall of the Third Reich	Himself	Narrator
2011	The Afternoon Play	Charlie	Episode: "Small Acts of Kindness"
2011	Waking The Dead	Bill Knight	Episode: "Waterloo: Part 1"
2011	U-Boat Wars: The Killer Wolf Packs	Himself	Narrator
2012	Silent Witness	Gordon Cairns	2 episodes
2012	Coronation Street	Ron Dent	Episode: #1.8026
2013	New Tricks	Peter Russell	Episode: "Things Can Only Get Better"
2013	Greatest Little Britons	Himself	Narrator
2014	Hitler: A Strategy Failure	Himself	Narrator
2015	Mega Oil Iraq	Himself	Narrator
2016	Doctors	Ian Tilworth	Episode: "A Christmas Treat"
2020	The Alienist	Judge	Episode: "Ex Ore Infantium"
2020	The Crown	Speaker of the House of Commons, Sir Bernard Weatherill	Episode: "War"
2021	Elliott from Earth	Voice	5 episodes
2020–2021	Royal Histories	Himself	Narrator
2021	The Queen Mother	Himself	3 episodes Narrator
2021	Abandoned: Expedition Shipwreck	Himself	2 episodes Readings By

=== Film ===
Year	Title	Role	Notes
1971	Nicholas and Alexandra	Martov	
1973	No Sex Please, We're British	Niko	
1974	Soft Beds, Hard Battles	Colonel Hiller	Uncredited
1979	Dirty Money	Rocco	
1980	Cry Wolf	Professor Ion Porphiriou	Short film
1987	Pretorius	Vaneck	
1992	Leon the Pig Farmer	Doctor	
2002	Hitler in His Own Words	Himself	Narrator
2004	Spartan	Business Man	
2004	Fakers	Alfonse Potrelli	
2005	The Upside of Anger	Emily's Doctor	
2005	Casanova	Donato	
2006	Sixty Six	Uncle Henry	
2007	Back in Business	Leonidov	
2007	Eichmann	Hans Lipmann	
2007	Shoot on Sight	Commander John Shepherd	
2009	Boogie Woogie	Bob's Lawyer	
2012	Emil Orange	English Narrator (voice)	Short film
2014	The Fall of Berlin	Himself	Narrator
2015	Woman in Gold	Bergen	
2015	Bill	Spanish Adviser	
2016	Risen	Caiaphus	
2018	Gerry	Royston	Short film
2022	Alfred Burke Is Frank Marker	Himself	
2024	Ibiza Dark	Greg	

=== Video games ===
Year	Title	Role	Notes
2002	Medieval: Total War	General Kihoto	
2004	Dragon Quest VIII	Additional voices	Voice: English version
2006	Medieval II: Total War	Various	
2007	Dragon Quest Swords	Sir Dick Worthington Draug	Voice: English version
2007	The Witcher	Raymond Maarloeve	Voice: English version
2008	Fable II	Barnum	
2008	Momento Mori	Various	
2009	BattleForge	Various	
2009	Anno 1404	Lord Richard Northburgh	Voice: English version
2009	Venetica	Various	Voice: English version
2010	Xenoblade Chronicles	Arglas	Voice: English version
2012	Risen 2: Dark Waters	Fence	
2013	Puppeteer	Narrator	
2015	Xenoblade Chronicles 3D	Arglas	Voice: English version
2018	Shadows: Awakening	Krek Bluntclaw	
2019	GreedFall	Sir De Courcillon Various	
2020	Skylords Reborn	Various	
2020	Xenoblade Chronicles: Definitive Edition	Arglas	Voice: English version
2021	It Takes Two	Vacuum	
2021	Warhammer Age of Sigmar: Storm Ground	Dreadblade Harrows	
2022	Total War: Warhammer III	Various	

=== Theatre ===
Date/Venue	Show	Role/Director
2012
Globe Theatre, Bankside	Prince of West End Lane, Kerry Shale	Role: Otto / Dir: Matthew Lloyd
2011
Royal Shakespeare Theatre	Maydays, David Edgar	Role: Teddy Weiner / Dir: Polly Findlay
2010
The Old Vic	Six Degrees of Separation, John Guare	Role: Dr Fine / Dir: David Grindley
2006
Comedy Theatre (The Harold Pinter)	George Dillon, John Osborne	Role: Barney Evans /Dir: Peter Gill
2003/2004
National Theatre	His Dark Materials, Philip Pullman	Roles: The President and John Faa / Dir: Nick Hytner
National Theatre	Edmund, David Mamet	Roles: The Interrogator and Hotel Clerk / Dir: Edward Hall
National Theatre	His Girl Friday, John Guare	Role: Louis / Dir: Jack O’Brien
2002
Hampstead Theatre	Benchmark, Bud Shrake & M Rudman	Role: Ginsberg / Dir: Michael Rudman
2000/2001
Apollo Theatre	Fallen Angels, Noël Coward	Role: Maurice / Dir: Michael Rudman
1999
Hampstead Theatre	Immaculate, Carl Djerassi	Role: Menachem / Dir: Gordy Greenberg
1994
Vaudeville Theatre	Reflected Glory, Ronald Harewood	Role: Robert / Dir: Elija Moshinsky
1992
Almeida Theatre	The Life of the World To Come, Rob Williams	Role: Don Strohmeyer / Dir: Derek Wax
1990
Wyndham's Theatre / Theatre Royal Windsor	Abracadaver, Allan Scott & David Ambrose	Role: Chief Insp Scott / Dir: Richard Olivier
1985
Theatre Royal Windsor/ Old Vic	A View from the Bridge, Arthur Miller	Role: Marco / Dir: Peter Coe
1982
Greenwich Theatre	The Paranormalist, Jonathan Gems	Role: Cedric / Dir: Alan Strachan
1979/1980
The National Theatre	Death of a Salesman, Arthur Miller	Role: Biff (Nom. Best Supporting Actor – Olivier Awards) / Dir: Michael Rudman
1976
Derby Playhouse	View from The Bridge, Arthur Miller	Role: Eddie Carbone / Dir: Patrick Lau
1974/1975
National Theatre at the Queen's Theatre	Saturday, Sunday, Monday, Eduardo De Fillipo	Role: Luigi / Nom. Best Supporting Actor – Critics' Circle Theatre Award / Dir: Franco Zeffirelli, Laurence Olivier
Theatre Royal Windsor	The Gingerbread Lady, Neil Simon	Role: Lou
1971/1973
National Theatre at the Old Vic	The Merchant of Venice, William Shakespeare	Role: Prince of Morocco / Dir: Jonathan Miller
National Theatre at the Old Vic	A Woman Killed with Kindness, Thomas Heywood	Role: Sir Francis Acton / Dir: John Dexter
National Theatre at the Old Vic	The Front Page, Hecht & Macarthur	Role: Diamond Louis / Dir: Michael Blakemore
National Theatre at the Old Vic	The School For Scandal, Sheridan	Role: Moses / Dir: Jonathan Miller
National Theatre at the Old Vic	Long Day's Journey into Night, Eugene O'Neill	Role: Edmund / Dir: Michael Blakemore
National Theatre at the Old Vic	Richard II, William Shakespeare	Role: Willoughby, Dir: David William
National Theatre at the Old Vic	Macbeth, William Shakespeare	Role: Caithness / Dir: Michael Blakemore
National Theatre at the Old Vic	Danton's Death, Georg Büchner	Role: Bertrand / Dir: Jonathan Miller
1970
Forum Theatre	Henry IV, Part 1, William Shakespeare	Role: Hotspur / Dir. Brian Shelton
1969/1970
Piccadilly Theatre	Richard II, William Shakespeare	Role: Mowbray / Dir: Richard Cotterel
Mermaid Theatre	Edward II, Christopher Marlowe	Role: Pembroke / Dir: Toby Robertson
1968/1969
Royal Shakespeare Company	King Lear, William Shakespeare	Role: Edmund's Captain / Dir: Trevor Nunn
Royal Shakespeare Co & North American Tour	Dr Faustus, Christopher Marlowe	Role: Valdes, Wrath / Dir: Clifford Williams
Royal Shakespeare Co & North American Tour	Much Ado About Nothing, William Shakespeare	Role: Soldier / Dir: Trevor Nunn
Royal Shakespeare Co & North American Tour	As You Like It, William Shakespeare	Role: Forester / Dir: David Jones
Royal Shakespeare Co & North American Tour	The Duchess of Malfi, John Webster	Role: Antonio / Dir: Christie Dickason
Royal Shakespeare Company	Troilus & Cressida, William Shakespeare	Role: Prologue / Dir: John Barton

=== Radio and audiobooks ===
Date/Venue	Name	Role
2020		
BBC R4	Keeping The Wolf Out	Sandor Farkas
2017
BBC R4	The Carter Mysteries	Phil
2015
BBC R4	Waterloo: The Ball at Brussells	Prince Tallyrand
2013
BBC R4	The Letters of JKF	Krushchev
BBC R4	Second Body	Jacobin
BBC R4	Austerlitz	Narrator
2011
BBC R4	Life & Death, Vasily Grossman	Karimov
BBC R4 Extra	The Man in Black, Mathew Collins	Mr Rubinstein
BBC R4	Small Acts of Kindness, Trevor Preston	Charlie
2010
BBC R4	Harry and the Angels, Bernard Kops	Harry
BBC R4	The Art of Deception, Philip Palmer	Stefan Hunt
USA Radio	Charlie's Choice	Sir Philip
2009
BBC R4	Tinker Tailor Soldier Spy, John le Carré	Polyakov
BBC R4	The Grand Babylon Hotel, Arnold Bennett	Felix Babylon
USA Radio	The Captive	Kanye
2008
BBC R4	The Babbington Plot, Michael Butt	Narrator
BBC R4	Peter Lorre V Peter Lorre, Michael Butt	Peter Lorre
BBC R4	Beat the Dog in His Own Kennel, Gary Brown	Avi
BBC Wales	Blake's 7 Interview	Himself as Travis
BBC R3	The Devil was Here Yesterday, Colin Teevan	Hector
2007
BBC R4	Take Away, Gary Brown	Narrator
BBC R4 Classic Serial	Witness, Nick Warburton	John The Baptist
BBC R4 Classic Serial	Captain Corelli's Mandolin, Louis de Bernières	Dr Iannis
BBC R4	The Iceman, Simon Bovey	Supt. Malpacket
BBC R4 Classic Serial	Down and Out in Paris and London, George Orwell	Boris
BBC R4	Hooligan Nights, Mike Walker	PC91
2006
BBC R4	Speed and Silver, Catherine Bailey	Ch. Insp. Collinson
Pre-2006
BBC R4 (1987–92)	Flying The Flag	The American Ambassador
BBC R4	The Nine Tailors, DL Sayers	Nobby Cranton
BBC R4	Call for the Dead, John le Carré	Dieter Frey
BBC R2	Hinge & Bracket, Gerald Frow	Roberto
BBC R4 (1985–1986)	Brogue Male	Count Laszlo Stroganoff
Audiobooks
AudioGo	"The Tractate Middoth", M R James	Narrator
AudioGo	Dr Palfrey of Westminster (5 books), John Creasey	Narrator
AudioGo	The Siege of the Villa Lipp, Eric Ambler	Narrator
The Story Circle Random House	His Dark Materials, Philip Pullman	Metatron
Isis	He Kills Coppers, Jake Arnott	Narrator
Isis	In a True Light, John Harvey	Narrator
Isis	Seeking Robinson Crusoe, Tim Severin	Narrator
Isis	The Lowlife, Alexander Baron	Narrator
Isis	The Sergeant's Tale, Bernice Rubens	Narrator
BBC Audio	The Match King, Frank Partnoy	Narrator
BBC Audio	Bad Dog and all that Hollywood Hoo Haa, Martin Chatterton	Narrator
BBC Audio (Won BBC Audio Books USA Earphones Award)	The Boy with the Magic Numbers, Sally Gardner	Narrator
BBC Audio	The Pianist, Wladyslaw Szpilman	Narrator
BBC Audio	The Darkness of Wallis Simpson, Rose Tremain	Narrator (With Eleanor Bron)

== Awards and nominations ==
Year	Award	Category	Work	Result
2013	Navtgr Awards	Best Narrator	Puppeteer	Nominated
2008	BBC Audio Books	Best Narrator	Boy with the magic No's	Won
1979	Oliver Awards	Best Supporting Actor	Death of Salesman	Nominated
1975	Critics Circle	Best Supporting Actor	Sat, Sun, Mon	Nominated
