= Rumpole and the Angel of Death =

Rumple and the Angel of Death
- First edition
- Author: John Mortimer
- Language: English
- Series: Rumpole of the Bailey
- Genre: legal
- Publisher: Viking Books
- Publication date: 1995
- Publication place: United Kingdom

Rumpole and the Angel of Death is a 1995 collection of short stories by John Mortimer about defence barrister Horace Rumpole. They were adapted from his scripts for the TV series of the same name. The stories were:

- "Hilda's Story"
- "Rumpole and the Angel of Death"
- "Rumpole and the Little Boy Lost"
- "Rumpole and the Model Prisoner"
- "Rumpole and the Rights of Man"
- "Rumpole and the Way Through the Woods"
