= Rumpole's Last Case =

1987 book by John Mortimer

- First edition
- Author: John Mortimer
- Language: English
- Series: Rumpole of the Bailey
- Genre: legal
- Publisher: Penguin Books
- Publication date: 1987
- Publication place: United Kingdom
- Followed by: Rumpole And the Age of Miracles

Rumpole's Last Case is a 1987 collection of short stories by John Mortimer about defence barrister Horace Rumpole. They were adapted from his scripts for the TV series of the same name. The stories were:

- "Rumpole and the Winter Break"
- "Rumpole and the Blind Tasting"
- "Rumpole and the Bright Seraphim"
- "Rumpole and the Judge's Elbow"
- "Rumpole and the Official Secret"
- "Rumpole and the Old, Old Story"
- "Rumpole's Last Case"
