= Rumpole's Return =

1980 novel by John Mortimer

- First edition
- Author: John Mortimer
- Language: English
- Series: Rumpole of the Bailey
- Genre: legal
- Publisher: Penguin Books
- Publication date: 1980
- Publication place: United Kingdom

Rumpole's Return is a 1980 novel by John Mortimer about the defence barrister Horace Rumpole. It was based on a script for a two-hour Rumpole telemovie of the same name.

The plot concerns Rumpole coming out of retirement in Florida to work on a case.
