= List of Rumpole of the Bailey episodes =

This is a list of episodes of the British courtroom drama, Rumpole of the Bailey.

== Series overview ==
Series	Episodes	Originally released	
Series	Episodes	First released	Last released
Special		16 December 1975	
1	6	3 April 1978	15 May 1978
2	6	29 May 1979	3 July 1979
Special		30 December 1980	
3	6	11 October 1983	15 November 1983
4	6	19 January 1987	25 February 1987
5	6	23 November 1988	28 December 1988
6	6	28 October 1991	2 December 1991
7	6	29 October 1992	3 December 1992

== Episodes ==
All listed dates indicate first UK transmission date

=== Play for Today (1975) ===
No. overall	Title	Directed by	Written by	Setting	Original release date
1	"Rumpole of the Bailey"	John Gorrie	John Mortimer	1974	16 December 1975
Horace Rumpole is an iconoclastic, poetry-quoting "Old Bailey hack", whose irreverence is not particularly popular with judges. He has a dysfunctional marriage to Hilda ("she who must be obeyed") and a rather tenuous relationship with his only son, Nick, who has always believed his father cares more for the Bailey than him. Although Nick is scheduled to leave for college in America, Rumpole opts to defend a Jamaican teenager who has apparently confessed to randomly stabbing a pedestrian at a bus stop after a cricket match. Nick does stop by the courthouse to have lunch with his father and try to establish communication with him before he leaves.

- This was a standalone production in 1975 for BBC TV's anthology series Play for Today. Duration: circa 65 minutes. It inspired the seven-series TV show that aired 1978–1992. Though not conceived as such, it was a de facto "pilot" for the subsequent TV series.
- Re-titled "Rumpole and the Confession of Guilt" for radio adaptation in 1980 and for DVD release in 2007. It was adapted into literary form by John Mortimer and published along with all six of the specially written new scripts from the 1980 radio series in the 1981 book Regina V. Rumpole (Re-published in 1982 under the title Rumpole for The Defence).

=== Series 1 (1978) ===
No. overall	No. in series	Title	Directed by	Written by	Setting	Original release date
2	1	"Rumpole and the Younger Generation"	Herbert Wise	John Mortimer	1967	3 April 1978
In 1967, Rumpole is defending a young member of the Timson clan, an extended family of light-fingered but otherwise moral South London villains. To his distress, his own son appears to be acquiring some of the Timson traits.
3	2	"Rumpole and the Alternative Society"	Herbert Wise	John Mortimer	1970	10 April 1978
In 1970, Rumpole travels to the West Country to defend Kathy Trelawny, a schoolteacher and member of a hippie commune charged with cannabis possession. Rumpole bases his defense on entrapment, arguing that a police officer disguised as a hippie manipulated his client into committing the crime. During the case, Rumpole finds himself attracted to the free-spirited lifestyle of his client, which highlights his dissatisfaction with his own life in London. While Rumpole focuses on preventing his client from going to prison, the case is complicated by the client’s desire to use the trial to make a public statement. Guest starring Jane Asher as Kathy, Edward Jewesbury as Tooke, Peter Jeffrey as Sam Dogherty, and Liz Fraser as Bobby Dogherty.
4	3	"Rumpole and the Honourable Member"	Graham Evans	John Mortimer	1974	17 April 1978
In 1974, Rumpole defends a Member of Parliament on a rape charge by attacking the victim’s character, which deeply disturbs his son Nick’s American fiancée, Erica. Despite Rumpole securing a path to acquittal, the client sabotages his own defense by giving vague, self-incriminating testimony in the witness box, leading to a guilty verdict and a five-year prison sentence. Disillusioned by Rumpole’s legal tactics and the outcome of the case, Erica and Nick decide to move to Baltimore, leaving Rumpole to face his family's disapproval and the dismissal of his long-time clerk, Albert. Guest starring Anton Rogers as Ken Aspen, and Judy Parfitt as Anna Aspen.
5	4	"Rumpole and the Married Lady"	Graham Evans	John Mortimer	1975	24 April 1978
After overhearing telephone calls between Rumpole and a highly emotional client – a woman seeking to divorce her husband – his wife Hilda ("she who must be obeyed") leaves to stay with her friend Dodo. The husband in the case is being represented by Rumpole's old friend and colleague George Frobisher.
6	5	"Rumpole and the Learned Friends"	Graham Evans	John Mortimer	1976	1 May 1978
Rumpole accuses a dishonest policeman of framing his safecracker client and finds himself in legal trouble when he cannot back up his claim.
7	6	"Rumpole and the Heavy Brigade"	Graham Evans	John Mortimer	1977	15 May 1978
Rumpole returns to bloodstains as he defends a stuttering, apparently mentally challenged petty crook on a murder charge.

- All six stories in TV series one were adapted into literary form by John Mortimer and published in the 1978 book Rumpole of the Bailey

=== Series 2 (1979) ===
No. overall	No. in series	Title	Directed by	Written by	Original release date
8	1	"Rumpole and the Man of God"	Brian Farnham	John Mortimer	29 May 1979
Rumpole defends a vicar accused of shoplifting three shirts although he refuses to testify in his own behalf.
9	2	"Rumpole and the Case of Identity"	Derek Bennett	John Mortimer	5 June 1979
Rumpole defends Dave Anstey against charges of a liquor store robbery and grievous bodily harm. The prosecution relies on a distinctive cap found at the crime scene, but Rumpole bases his defense on proving his client is a victim of mistaken identity: Anstey has been framed by his employer, who is having an affair with his wife. Concurrently, a separate extramarital affair involving his Head of Chambers, Guthrie Featherstone, and a newly hired secretary, causes tension and disrupts the internal stability of their equity chambers. Guest starring Tony Caunter as Freddie Albright, Martin Fisk as Dave Anstey, Seretta Wilson as Betty Anstey, and Caroline Holdaway as Angela.
10	3	"Rumpole and the Show Folk"	Peter Hammond	John Mortimer	12 June 1979
Rumpole travels to a regional repertory theater in the north of England to defend actress Maggie Hartley, who is charged with the murder of her husband after being found standing over his body with a gun. After a series of witnesses establishes the victim as a bully, a drunk, and an adulterer, Rumpole successfully convinces the jury that the weapon discharged accidentally during a physical struggle. Following the trial, Hartley reveals that they were quarreling because she had withheld £20,000 owed to her husband, leading Rumpole to believe that he has secured the acquittal of a murderer. Guest starring Eleanor Bron as Maggie Hartley, Sebastian Shaw as Mr. Justice Skelton, John Wells as Daniel Derwent, and Bernard Archard as Jarvis Allen.
11	4	"Rumpole and the Fascist Beast"	Robert Knights	John Mortimer	19 June 1979
Retired Captain Rex Parkin of the Pay Corps is charged with an offence under the Race Relations Act and finds to his horror that Rumpole has taken under his wing a pupil barrister from the Punjab.
12	5	"Rumpole and the Course of True Love"	Brian Farnham	John Mortimer	26 June 1979
Rumpole defends Ronald Ransom, an English teacher accused of seducing a pupil — a case in which Ransom is found guilty. Phyllida Trant discovers she is pregnant but is reluctant to tell the father, Claude Erskine-Brown, fearing he will pressure her to give up her legal career. She confides in Rumpole, who lets it slip to Hilda; Erskine-Brown eventually hears through chambers gossip. He and Phyllida reconcile and marry. Meanwhile, Guthrie Featherstone is threatened with divorce by his wife Marigold unless he accepts a judgeship; at Phyllida and Erskine-Brown's wedding, she relents. Guest starring Nigel Havers as Ronald Ransom, John Nettleton as Mr. Potter, and Peter Cellier as Mr Grayson.
13	6	"Rumpole and the Age for Retirement"	Donald McWhinnie	John Mortimer	3 July 1979
Rumpole defends the elderly Percy Timson, a member of a regular client family of petty criminals accused of receiving stolen property. During the proceedings, Rumpole discovers that Timson's family conspired to set up the crime in order to force their relative into retirement. Meanwhile, Rumpole's wife, Hilda, his son Nick, and his Head of Chambers, Guthrie Featherstone, attempt to pressure Rumpole into his own retirement, but he successfully clears his client and vows to continue practicing law. Guest starring George Hilsdon as Percy Timson, Julia McCarthy as Noreen Timson, Frank Coda as Cyril Timson, and James Bree as Mr. Glassworth.

- All six stories in TV series two were adapted into literary form by John Mortimer and published in the 1979 book The Trials of Rumpole

=== Special (1980) ===
No. overall	Title	Directed by	Written by	Original release date
14	"Rumpole's Return"	John Glenister	John Mortimer	30 December 1980
An aristocrat, Rory Canter,is found murdered on the London Underground, after a struggle with a man named Simpson, who is seen fleeing the scene with a bloody knife. Following Simpson's arrest, the police discover a mysterious letter written entirely in blood. Horace Rumpole has retired to Florida after a string of lost cases, but he is lured back to London when colleague Phyllida Erskine-Brown writes to him for expertise on the bloodstain evidence. To re-establish himself in his old chambers, Rumpole takes on an obscenity case involving pornographic magazines, which his wife, Hilda, mistakenly believes belong to him for personal use. Though Rumpole delivers an impassioned freedom of speech defense, his obscenity client is found guilty, prompting a brief and quickly aborted romantic misunderstanding with Hilda. Rumpole is then brought onto the murder case by a colleague, Ken Cracknell, who secretly hopes the old lawyer will lose and leave the chambers permanently. Utilizing information from his son in Florida, Rumpole discovers that the blood-written letter is an initiation rite for a religious cult to which both the victim and the defendant belonged. It emerges that Simpson had exposed financial embezzlement by the cult's leadership, prompting Canter to attack him in retaliation before being killed during the physical struggle. At the chambers' Christmas party, it is announced that a vacancy has opened up because another lawyer was appointed as a judge, allowing Rumpole to secure his old seat permanently. Guest starring Robin Halstead as Rory Canter, John Price as Ken Cracknell, and Albert Welling as Hubert Simpson.

- This production was created as a standalone, feature length special in 1980. Duration: circa 103 minutes. It aired between series two and series three. It was adapted into literary form by John Mortimer and published in the 1980 book Rumpole's Return

=== Series 3 (1983) ===
No. overall	No. in series	Title	Directed by	Written by	Original release date
15	1	"Rumpole and the Genuine Article"	Robert Knights	John Mortimer	11 October 1983
Rumpole takes on the defense of art dealer Harold Brittling, who is accused of selling a forged painting attributed to artist Septimus Cragg. Guthrie Featherstone worries that office gossip will jeopardize his impending judicial appointment, but he is elevated to the bench and presides over Brittling's trial. During the proceedings, Brittling implies to the court that he painted the artwork himself to prove his own artistic talent. However, Rumpole tracks down the painting's original model, Brittling’s ex-wife, who confirms the artwork is actually an authentic Cragg original, revealing that the defendant deliberately attempted to frame himself as a forger. Guest starring Emlyn Williams as Harold Brittling, Brenda Blethyn as Pauline, Sylvia Coleridge as Nancy, and Vernon Dobtcheff as Edward Gandolphini.
16	2	"Rumpole and the Golden Thread"	Donald McWhinnie	John Mortimer	18 October 1983
Rumpole travels to the African nation of Neranga to defend his former student, government minister David Mazenze, who is accused of murdering a bishop. Despite facing a corrupt judge and a politically charged atmosphere, Rumpole builds a defense challenging the driver's eyewitness testimony. Mazenze's secret second wife, a member of the Prime Minister's tribe, provides a crucial alibi, resulting in a not guilty verdict. Following the trial, Rumpole is briefly detained over a misunderstood telegram before being rescued by the British ambassador. Though acquitted, Mazenze's political career is ruined by the revelation of his marriage, and the episode ends with his assassination. Guest starring Errol John as Chief Justice Sir Worthington Banzana, Olu Jacobs as David Mazenzie, Hugh Quarshie as Jonathan Mazenze, Joseph Marcell as Freddy Ruingo, Elizabeth Adare as Mabel Mazenze. Note: the phrase "Golden Thread" refers to the presumption of innocence in British law.
17	3	"Rumpole and the Old Boy Net"	Tony Smith	John Mortimer	25 October 1983
Rumpole is assigned to defend Napier and Lorraine Lee, a couple accused of running an upscale brothel and blackmailing an anonymous senior civil servant known as "Mr. X." Aided by a struggling young barrister named Fiona Allways, Rumpole uncovers that Mr. X regularly paid the establishment's bills and was actually an investor in the business. Rumpole successfully clears his clients of the blackmail charges by demonstrating that the civil servant fabricated the accusation merely to ensure the court would protect his identity. Meanwhile, despite his wife Hilda's ambitions for him to become the new Head of Chambers, Rumpole loses the leadership position to the case's prosecuting attorney, Sam Ballard. Guest starring Michael Denison as Napier Lee, Dulcie Gray as Lorraine Lee, Jack Watling as Mr. X, and Tenniel Evans as Stephen Lucas.
18	4	"Rumpole and the Female of the Species"	Donald McWhinnie	John Mortimer	1 November 1983
Rumpole defends Anthony Timson, who is accused of participating in a bank robbery after cash is discovered in his washing machine and a captured robber implicates him. Due to chambers politics and shifting professional dynamics, Phyllida Erskine-Brown is initially brought in to defend him. The defendant insists that Rumpole replace her, but he becomes her junior counsel after she unexpectedly receives silk as a Queen's Counsel. Meanwhile, Rumpole maneuvers behind the scenes to secure a permanent position in chambers for Fiona Allways, against institutional opposition from his colleagues. It is ultimately revealed that Anthony's wife, April, was the actual getaway driver who hid the stolen money, leading to an acquittal. Guest starting Ray Brooks as Tony Timson, Peter Howell as Judge Leonard Dover, Mary Maddox as April Timson, and Terence Budd as Gerry Molloy.
19	5	"Rumpole and the Sporting Life"	Bill Hays	John Mortimer	8 November 1983
Rumpole reluctantly agrees to defend Jennifer Postern, the sister of chambers colleague Fiona Allways, after she claims to have shot her wealthy husband Jonathan accidentally. Rumpole discovers a discrepancy in the pathologist's report showing the body sustained two gunshot wounds rather than one, suggesting a second shooter. It emerges that Jennifer was having an affair with jockey Maurice Fishbourne, and she initially claimed she shot him to protect him because she believed he was responsible. Once Fishbourne's alibi is established, Jennifer reveals the truth on the stand, and is acquitted after the judge suggests a neighboring landowner may have fired the fatal shot accidentally. Guest starring Joanna David as Jennifer Postern, Tim Wylton as Doctor Overton, Frank Mills as Mr Figgis, Andrew Burt as Jonathan Postern, and Ron Berglas as Maurice Fishbourne.
20	6	"Rumpole and the Last Resort"	Stuart Burge	John Mortimer	15 November 1983
When Frank Armstrong, a mobile home park owner, is accused of fraud for booking non-existent vacation homes, Rumpole takes the defense while trying to collect fees owed to him by the park's elusive former solicitor, Perivale Blythe, for past legal work. To force Blythe into the open, Rumpole enlists private investigator Fig Newton and fakes his own death. When he shows up at Rumpole's house to get Hilda to accept a smaller payment, she tricks him into paying up. Blythe testifies that the Armstrong's brother sabotaged the park's computer system to book non-existent holidays, so that Armstrong would be found guilty of fraud, and the brother could acquire the land and its valuable tin deposits. Rumpole successfully exonerates his client, secures his long-overdue fees, and returns to chambers to toast his own return from the dead. Guest starring Terence Rigby as Perivale Blythe, Michael Melia as Frank Armstrong, and Michael Elwyn as Mr. Medway.

- All six stories in TV series three were adapted into literary form by John Mortimer and published in the 1983 book Rumpole and the Golden Thread

=== Series 4 (1987) ===
No. overall	No. in series	Title	Directed by	Written by	Original release date
21	1	"Rumpole and the Old, Old Story"	Roger Bamford	John Mortimer	19 January 1987
Rumpole takes on the case of Hugo Lutterworth, a garden center co-owner accused of attempted murder after sabotaging his business partner Captain Gleason’s car brakes. Meanwhile, Rumpole moves into his legal chambers after a marital dispute with his wife, Hilda. This leads to friction with chamber head Sam Ballard, who also threatens to ban smoking in chambers, whereupon he moves in with fellow barristers Claude and Phyllida Erskine-Brown. In court, Rumpole reveals that Captain Gleason drained his own brake fluid to frame Lutterworth, aiming to strip him of his partnership share and force the sale of their land. With the truth uncovered and Lutterworth cleared, Rumpole reconciles with Hilda and returns home, while leveraging a personal slip-up by Ballard to secure his smoking privileges in chambers. Guest starring Maurice Denham as Mr. Justice Gwent-Evans, David Waller as Captain Gleason, Victoria Wicks as Amanda Gleason, and Robin Sachs as Hugo Lutterworth.
22	2	"Rumpole and the Blind Tasting"	Roger Bamford	John Mortimer	26 January 1987
Rumpole successfully defends recurring client Hugh Timson against charges of receiving stolen silver, only for Timson to be promptly re-arrested when police discover crates of stolen Château Cheval Blanc in his garage. To assist on the case, Rumpole maneuvers head of chambers Sam Ballard into hiring pupil Liz Probert, the radical daughter of a prominent leftist trade union leader whom Ballard mistakes for a conservative canon's daughter. Meanwhile, Rumpole is eliminated early in a blind wine tasting hosted by Claude Erskine-Brown's former school rival, Martyn Vanberry, whose cellar was the source of the stolen wine. At trial before Judge Graves, Rumpole demonstrates that Vanberry swapped the premium vintage for cheap wine as part of an insurance fraud scheme, successfully securing Timson's acquittal. Off-stage, Rumpole's innocent demonstration of the vagus nerve to Liz leads to a romantic misunderstanding, causing visitor Dodo Mackintosh to depart in protest. Guest starring Phyllida Law as Honoria Bird, Dave King as Monty Mantis, Stephen Greif as Martyn Vanberry, and Mark Kingston as Ron Probert.
23	3	"Rumpole and the Official Secret"	Rodney Bennett	John Mortimer	2 February 1987
Civil servant Rosemary Tuttle is prosecuted under the Official Secrets Act after a newspaper leaks information about government expenditure on tea and biscuits. Rumpole takes her case, but notices inconsistencies in the typewriter evidence and believes Tuttle was framed. During a break at the opera, civil servant Oliver Bowling confesses to Rumpole that he staged the leak and framed Tuttle to prevent her from revealing incriminating information about himself, before committing suicide at a tube station. With the true perpetrator revealed, the prosecution drops all charges against Tuttle. Guest starring Judy Cornwell as Rosemary Tuttle, Peter Cellier as Sir Frank Fawcett, Paul Daneman as the Lord Chief Justice, Donald Pickering as the Attorney General, and Shaughan Seymour as Oliver Bowling.
24	4	"Rumpole and the Judge's Elbow"	Donald McWhinnie	John Mortimer	9 February 1987
Rumpole defends Dr. Maurice Horridge, a theologian running a massage parlor accused of operating as a disorderly house. Meanwhile, modernizing newcomer Mr. Hearthstoke threatens to overhaul chamber operations and eliminate the clerks' jobs. Having been assigned the case, Judge Guthrie Featherstone secretly fears public exposure after visiting a massage parlor to treat his tennis elbow, and seems to argue on behalf of the defense in court. During discovery, Rumpole seeks to use credit card receipts to show clients sought legitimate treatment, inadvertently revealing Hearthstoke as a patron. Featherstone realizes he visited an unrelated clinic and shifts his stance against Horridge, resulting in his conviction. Ultimately, Hearthstoke leaves chambers to avoid exposure, Erskine-Brown is appointed as an assistant recorder, and Rumpole concludes by advising both against paying for sensitive services by credit card. Guest starring Peter Bowles as Guthrie Featherstone, Joanna Van Gyseghem as Marigold Featherstone, Nicholas Gecks as Charles Hearthstoke, Geoffrey Bayldon as Brinsley Lampitt, Kenneth Cope as Norman, and Hugh Walters as Harold.
25	5	"Rumpole and the Bright Seraphim"	Martyn Friend	John Mortimer	16 February 1987
Rumpole travels to a British Army base in Germany to defend Trooper Danny Boyne, who is accused of murdering his abusive sergeant, Sam "Jumbo" Wilson. Although a bloodied shirt and Boyne's own threats initially point toward his guilt, Rumpole casts doubt on the prosecution's timeline and medical evidence, proving the murder took place earlier than claimed. Rumpole ultimately discovers that regimental officers moved the body after the fact to prevent a member of the regiment from being accused of the crime, revealing that Boyne's wife was the actual killer. Guest starring Peter Jones as Major Johnnie Pageant, Dominic Jephcott as Captain Sandy Ransom, Neil Stacy as Lt. Col. Hugo Undershaft, Robert East as Lr. Col. Mike Watford, and Leonard O'Malley as Trooper Danny Boyne.
26	6	"Rumpole's Last Case"	Rodney Bennett	John Mortimer	25 February 1987
While defending one of the Timson clan, Rumpole makes an exotic horse racing bet which may allow him to retire if he wins.

- All six stories in TV series four were adapted into literary form by John Mortimer and published in the 1987 book Rumpole's Last Case

=== Series 5 (1988) ===
No. overall	No. in series	Title	Directed by	Written by	Original release date
27	1	"Rumpole and the Bubble Reputation"	Mike Vardy	John Mortimer	23 November 1988
A notorious tabloid hires Rumpole to defend it in a libel suit being brought by a puritanical novelist it has accused of sexual promiscuity.
28	2	"Rumpole and the Barrow Boy"	Julian Amyes	John Mortimer	30 November 1988
Nigel Timson, one of the few members of the notorious Timson clan to have a legitimate job, is defended by Rumpole on a charge of insider trading.
29	3	"Rumpole and the Age of Miracles"	Mike Vardy	John Mortimer	7 December 1988
Rumpole defends Hilda's nephew, a canon accused of adultery, in an ecclesiastical court.
30	4	"Rumpole and the Tap End"	Julian Amyes	John Mortimer	14 December 1988
Featherstone's controversial remarks and ruling in a domestic violence case causes fallout from women's rights groups and concern from the Lord Chancellor.
31	5	"Rumpole and Portia"	Roger Bamford	John Mortimer	21 December 1988
Rumpole defends a scrap dealer accused of selling arms to terrorists, while Phyllida presides at the trial in her newly appointed job as recorder.
32	6	"Rumpole and the Quality of Life"	Roger Bamford	John Mortimer	28 December 1988
Rumpole defends Lady Perdita Derwent, charged with the murder of her elderly husband. Meanwhile, Ms Liz Probert complains of anti-gay discrimination at number 3 Equity Court, and the portly Rumpole suffers from a strict diet imposed by Hilda.

- All six stories in TV series five were adapted into literary form by John Mortimer and published in the 1988 book Rumpole and the Age of Miracles

=== Series 6 (1991) ===
No. overall	No. in series	Title	Directed by	Written by	Original release date
33	1	"Rumpole à la Carte"	Jim Goddard	John Mortimer	28 October 1991
Rumpole agrees to defend an elitist restauranteur, whom he dislikes, when a live mouse jumps out from one of his gourmet meals.
34	2	"Rumpole and the Summer of Discontent"	Julian Amyes	John Mortimer	4 November 1991
Rumpole defends a union activist accused of manslaughter, while Hilda goes on strike as Rumpole's cook because of his late hours.
35	3	"Rumpole and the Right to Silence"	Julian Amyes	John Mortimer	11 November 1991
A radical college professor accused of murder refuses to disclose his alibi, while Ballard and Erskine-Brown learn domestic lessons about the right to silence.
36	4	"Rumpole at Sea"	Michael Simpson	John Mortimer	18 November 1991
While on a Mediterranean cruise, Rumpole is confronted with his old nemesis, Judge Graves, and the unexplained disappearance of one of his fellow passengers.
37	5	"Rumpole and the Quacks"	Robert Tronson	John Mortimer	25 November 1991
Rumpole defends a Pakistani doctor accused of molesting a female patient, and Phyllida suspects Erskine-Brown of philandering.
38	6	"Rumpole for the Prosecution"	Robert Tronson	John Mortimer	2 December 1991
Rumpole agrees to prosecute for the first time in a private complaint brought by the rich father of a murdered girl.

- All six stories in TV series six were adapted into literary form by John Mortimer and published in the 1990 book Rumpole à la Carte

=== Series 7 (1992) ===
No. overall	No. in series	Title	Directed by	Written by	Original release date
39	1	"Rumpole and the Children of the Devil"	James Cellan Jones	John Mortimer	29 October 1992
A well-meaning social worker takes custody of an eight-year-old Timson girl after claiming that the family is involved with devil worship.
40	2	"Rumpole and the Miscarriage of Justice"	Robert Tronson	John Mortimer	5 November 1992
Rumpole finds himself in the unusual position of defending a police officer on a charge of falsifying a confession.
41	3	"Rumpole and the Eternal Triangle"	Robert Tronson	John Mortimer	12 November 1992
After becoming enamoured of a beautiful violinist, Rumpole finds himself defending her husband on a charge of murdering her lover.
42	4	"Rumpole and the Reform of Joby Jonson"	Martyn Friend	John Mortimer	19 November 1992
Rumpole defends a juvenile delinquent on charges of assaulting an elderly woman, and Hilda is concerned when a burglar breaks in to steal evidence from his briefcase.
43	5	"Rumpole and the Family Pride"	John Gorrie	John Mortimer	26 November 1992
The suspicious drowning of an elderly woman on his estate prompts Lord Sackbut to invite his wife's distant relative Hilda and her husband Rumpole for the weekend, during which he asks Horace to represent him at the inquest.
44	6	"Rumpole on Trial"	John Gorrie	John Mortimer	3 December 1992
Last ever episode. When Rumpole is charged by Judge Oliphant with contempt of court and faces disbarment, Hilda persuades Sam Ballard to defend him.

- All six stories in TV series seven were adapted into literary form by John Mortimer and published in the 1992 book Rumpole on Trial
