= John Mortimer =

British barrister and author (1923–2009)

Sir John Mortimer CBE QC FRSL
- Born: John Clifford Mortimer; 21 April 1923; Hampstead, London, England
- Died: 16 January 2009 (aged 85); Turville Heath, Buckinghamshire, England
- Resting place: St Mary the Virgin Church, Turville
- Education: Brasenose College, Oxford
- Occupations: Barrister; dramatist; screenwriter; author
- Spouses: Penelope Fletcher (m. 1949; div. 1971) Penelope Gollop (m. 1972)
- Children: with Fletcher: Sally Silverman, Jeremy Mortimer; with Gollop: Emily Mortimer, Rosie Mortimer; with Wendy Craig: Ross Bentley
- Writing career
- Notable works: A Voyage Round My Father; Rumpole of the Bailey
- Notable awards: Queen's Counsel (1966); CBE (1986); Knighthood (1998)

Sir John Clifford Mortimer (21 April 1923 – 16 January 2009) was a British barrister, dramatist, screenwriter and author. He is best known for short stories about a barrister named Horace Rumpole, adapted from episodes of the television series Rumpole of the Bailey also written by Mortimer.

== Early life ==
Mortimer was born in Hampstead, London, the only child of Kathleen May (née Smith) and (Herbert) Clifford Mortimer, a divorce and probate barrister who became blind in 1936 when he hit his head on the door frame of a London taxi but still pursued his career.

He was educated at the Dragon School in Oxford and Harrow School, where he joined the Communist Party, forming a one-member cell. He first intended to be an actor (his lead role in the Dragon's 1937 production of Richard II gained glowing reviews in The Draconian) and then a writer, but his father persuaded him against it, advising: "My dear boy, have some consideration for your unfortunate wife... [the law] gets you out of the house."

At 17, Mortimer went to Brasenose College, Oxford, where he read law, though he was actually based at Christ Church because the Brasenose buildings had been requisitioned for the war effort. In July 1942, at the end of his second year, he was sent down from Oxford by John Lowe, Dean of Christ Church, after romantic letters to a Bradfield College sixth-former, Quentin Edwards, later a QC, were discovered by the young man's housemaster. However, Mortimer was still allowed to take his Bachelor of Arts degree in law in October 1943. His close friend Michael Hamburger believed he had been very harshly treated.

== Early writing career ==
With weak eyes and doubtful lungs, Mortimer was classified as medically unfit for military service in World War II. He worked for the Crown Film Unit under Laurie Lee, writing scripts for propaganda documentaries.

I lived in London and went on journeys in blacked-out trains to factories and coal-mines and military and air force installations. For the first and, in fact, the only time in my life I was, thanks to Laurie Lee, earning my living entirely as a writer. If I have knocked the documentary ideal, I would not wish to sound ungrateful to the Crown Film Unit. I was given great and welcome opportunities to write dialogue, construct scenes and try and turn ideas into some kind of visual drama.

He based his first novel, Charade, on his experiences with the Crown Film Unit.

Mortimer made his radio debut as a dramatist in 1955, adapting his own novel Like Men Betrayed for the BBC Light Programme. His debut as an original playwright came with The Dock Brief starring Michael Hordern as a hapless barrister, first broadcast in 1957 on BBC Radio's Third Programme, and later televised with the same cast. It later appeared in a double bill with What Shall We Tell Caroline? at the Lyric Hammersmith in April 1958, before transferring to the Garrick Theatre. The Dock Brief was revived by Christopher Morahan in 2007 for a touring double bill with Legal Fictions. It won the Prix Italia in 1957, and its success on radio, stage, and television led Mortimer to prefer writing for performance rather than writing novels.

Mortimer's play A Voyage Round My Father, first broadcast on radio in 1963, is autobiographical, recounting his experiences as a young barrister and his relations with his blind father. It was televised by BBC Television in 1969 with Mark Dignam in the title role. In a lengthier version, the play became a stage success – first at Greenwich Theatre with Dignam, then in 1971 at the Theatre Royal Haymarket with Alec Guinness). In 1981 it was remade by Thames Television with Laurence Olivier as the father and Alan Bates as young Mortimer. In 1965, he and his wife wrote the screenplay for the Otto Preminger film Bunny Lake is Missing, which also starred Olivier.

== Legal career ==
Mortimer was called to the Bar (Inner Temple) in 1948, at the age of 25. His early career covered testamentary and divorce work, but on taking silk in 1966, he began to undertake criminal law. His highest profile came from cases relating to claims of obscenity, which, according to Mortimer, were "alleged to be testing the frontiers of tolerance."

He has sometimes been cited wrongly as one of the Lady Chatterley's Lover obscenity trial defence team. He did, however, successfully defend publishers John Calder and Marion Boyars in a 1968 appeal against a conviction for publishing Hubert Selby Jr.'s Last Exit to Brooklyn. He assumed a similar role three years later, this time unsuccessfully, for Richard Handyside, the English publisher of The Little Red Schoolbook.

In 1971, Mortimer managed to defend the editors of the satirical paper Oz against a charge of "conspiracy to corrupt and debauch the morals of the young of the Realm", which might have carried a sentence of 12 years' hard labour. In 1976, he defended Gay News editor Denis Lemon (Whitehouse v. Lemon) against charges of blasphemous libel for publishing James Kirkup's The Love That Dares to Speak Its Name; Lemon was given a suspended prison sentence, which was overturned on appeal. He successfully defended Virgin Records in a 1977 obscenity hearing for using the word bollocks in the title of the Sex Pistols album Never Mind the Bollocks, Here's the Sex Pistols and the manager of the Nottingham branch of Virgin record shop chain for displaying and selling the record. Mortimer retired from the bar in 1984.

== Later writing career ==
Mortimer is best remembered for creating a barrister named Horace Rumpole, inspired by his father Clifford, whose speciality is defending those accused in London's Old Bailey. Mortimer created Rumpole for a BBC Play For Today in 1975. Although not Mortimer's first choice of actor – in an interview on the DVD set, he said he wanted Alistair Sim "but he turned out to be dead so he couldn't take it on" – Australian-born Leo McKern played Rumpole with gusto and proved popular. The idea was developed into a series, Rumpole of the Bailey, for Thames Television, in which McKern kept the lead role. Mortimer also wrote a series of Rumpole books. In September–October 2003, BBC Radio 4 broadcast four new 45-minute Rumpole plays by Mortimer with Timothy West in the title role. Mortimer also dramatised many real-life cases of the barrister Edward Marshall-Hall in a radio series with former Doctor Who star Tom Baker as protagonist.

In 1975 and 1976, Mortimer adapted eight of Graham Greene’s short stories for episodes of Shades of Greene presented by Thames Television. Mortimer was credited with writing the script for Granada Television's 1981 serialization of Brideshead Revisited, based on the novel by Evelyn Waugh. However, Graham Lord's unofficial biography, John Mortimer: The Devil's Advocate, revealed in 2005 that none of Mortimer's submitted scripts had in fact been used and the screenplay was actually written by the series' producer and director. Mortimer adapted John Fowles's The Ebony Tower starring Laurence Olivier for Granada in 1984. In 1986, his adaptation of his own novel Paradise Postponed was televised. He wrote the script, based on the autobiography of Franco Zeffirelli, for the 1999 film Tea with Mussolini, directed by Zeffirelli and starring Joan Plowright, Cher, Judi Dench, Maggie Smith and Lily Tomlin. From 2004, Mortimer worked as a consultant for the politico-legal US "dramedy" television show Boston Legal.

Mortimer developed his career as a dramatist by rising early to write before attending court. His work in total includes over 50 books, plays and scripts. Besides 13 episodes of Rumpole dramatized for radio in 1980, several others of his works were broadcast on the BBC, including the true crime series John Mortimer Presents: The Trials Of Marshall Hall and Sensational British Trials.

In later life, Mortimer toured in a show of readings and personal anecdotes called "Mortimer's Miscellany", with the actresses Joanna David and Rohan McCullough, with accompanying piano parts and musical interludes provided by Jon Lord, formerly of the rock band, Deep Purple. Mortimer and Lord became near neighbours and close personal friends later in life and Lord composed a six-part movement, To Notice Such Things in memoriam to Mortimer in 2009.

== Personal life and death ==
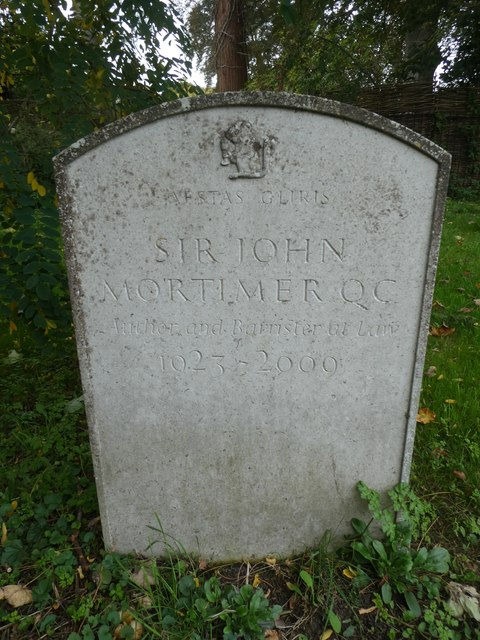
Grave of John Mortimer

Penelope Fletcher, better known as Penelope Mortimer, met John Mortimer while still married to Charles Dimont and pregnant with their last child. Fletcher married Mortimer on 27 August 1949, the same day her divorce from Dimont became absolute. Together they went on to have a son, Jeremy Mortimer, and a daughter, Sally Silverman. The unstable marriage inspired work by both writers, of which Penelope's novel, The Pumpkin Eater (1962), later made into a film of the same name, is best known. The couple divorced in 1971 and he married Penelope Gollop in 1972. They had two daughters, Emily Mortimer (1971), and Rosie Mortimer (1984). He and his second wife lived in the Buckinghamshire village of Turville Heath. The split with his first wife had been bitter, but they were on friendly terms by the time of her death in 1999.

In September 2004, the Sunday Telegraph journalist Tim Walker revealed that Mortimer had fathered another son, Ross Bentley, who was conceived during a secret affair Mortimer had with the English actress Wendy Craig more than 40 years earlier. He was born in November 1961. Craig and Mortimer had met when the actress had been cast playing a pregnant woman in Mortimer's first full-length West End play, The Wrong Side of the Park. Ross Bentley was raised by Craig and her husband, Jack Bentley, the show business writer and musician.

In Mortimer's memoirs, Clinging to the Wreckage, he wrote of "enjoying my mid-thirties and all the pleasures which come to a young writer."

Mortimer suffered a stroke in October 2008, and died on 16 January 2009, aged 85.

== Honours ==
Mortimer won a BAFTA Award for creating Rumpole. Awarded a CBE in 1986, he was made a knight bachelor in the 1998 Birthday Honours.

== Attributes ==
John Mortimer was a member of English PEN. He was patron of the Burma Campaign UK, the London-based group campaigning for human rights and democracy in Burma and president of the Royal Court Theatre, having been the chairman of its board from 1990 to 2000.

== Bibliography ==
- Charade, Mortimer's first novel, Bodley Head, London (1947); Viking, New York (1986); ISBN 0-670-81186-6
- English Fashions: A Puffin Picture Book, Puffin Books (1947). Illustrated by Victor Ross
- Rumming Park, Bodley Head, London (1948)
- Answer Yes Or No, Bodley Head, London (1950)
- Like Men Betrayed, Collins, London (1953); Viking, New York (1988); ISBN 0-670-81187-4
- The Narrowing Stream, Collins, London (1954); Viking, New York (1989); ISBN 0-670-81930-1
- Three Winters, Collins, London (1956)
- Heaven and Hell (including The Fear of Heaven and The Prince of Darkness) (1976)
- Will Shakespeare (1977)
- Rumpole of the Bailey (1978); ISBN 0-14-004670-4
- The Trials of Rumpole (1979)
- Rumpole's Return (1980)
- Regina v Rumpole (1981)
- Rumpole for the Defence (1982)
- Clinging to the Wreckage: A Part Of Life (autobiography) Weidenfeld & Nicolson, London (1982); ISBN 0-297-78010-7; Houghton Mifflin, New York (1982); ISBN 0-89919-133-9
- The First Rumpole Omnibus (omnibus) (1983)
- Rumpole and the Golden Thread (1983)
- A Choice of Kings, in Alan Durband, ed., Playbill 3 (Nelson Thornes, 1966), ISBN 978-0091054212
- Edwin and Other Plays (1984)
- In Character (1984); ISBN 0-14-006389-7
- Paradise Postponed (1985); ISBN 0-670-80094-5
- Character Parts (1986); ISBN 0-14-008959-4
- Rumpole for the Prosecution (1986)
- Rumpole's Last Case (1987)
- The Second Rumpole Omnibus (omnibus) (1987)
- Rumpole and the Age of Miracles (1988)
- Glasnost (BBC Radio Four, 1988)
- Summer's Lease (1988); ISBN 0-14-010573-5
- Rumpole and the Age for Retirement (1989) - stand-alone publication of short story first published in The Trials of Rumpole (1979)
- Rumpole a La Carte (1990)
- Titmuss Regained (1990)
- Great Law And Order Stories (1990)
- The Rapstone Chronicles (omnibus; 1991)
- Rumpole On Trial (1992)
- Dunster (1992); ISBN 0-670-84060-2
- Thou Shalt Not Kill: Father Brown, Father Dowling And Other Ecclesiastical Sleuths (1992) (with G K Chesterton and Ralph McInerny)
- The Oxford Book of Villains (1992)
- The Best of Rumpole: A Personal Choice (1993)
- Under the Hammer (1994)
- Murderers and Other Friends: Another Part of Life (autobiography), Viking, London (1994); Viking, NY (1995); ISBN 0-670-84902-2
- Rumpole and the Angel of Death (1995)
- Rumpole and the Younger Generation (1995) - stand-alone publication of short story first published in Rumpole of the Bailey (1978)
- Felix in the Underworld (1996)
- The Third Rumpole Omnibus (omnibus) (1997)
- The Sound of Trumpets (1998)
- The Mammoth Book of Twentieth-Century Ghost Stories (1998)
- The Summer of a Dormouse: A Year of Growing Old Disgracefully (autobiography), Viking Penguin, London (2000); ISBN 0-670-89106-1; Viking Press, New York (2001); ISBN 0-670-89986-0
- Rumpole Rests His Case (2002)
- Rumpole and the Primrose Path (2002)
- The Brancusi Trial (2003)
- Where There's a Will (autobiography), Viking, London (2003) ISBN 0-670-91365-0; Viking, New York (2005); ISBN 0-670-03409-6
- Rumpole and the Penge Bungalow Murders (2004); ISBN 9780141017761
- Quite Honestly (2005); ISBN 0-670-03483-5
- The Scales of Justice (2005); ISBN 9780141022642
- Rumpole and the Reign of Terror (2006); ISBN 9780670916214
- The Antisocial Behaviour of Horace Rumpole (2007; in United States as Rumpole Misbehaves)
- Rumpole at Christmas (2009) ISBN 9780670917914

== Select screenwriting credits ==
- The Innocents (additional dialogue, 1961)
- Lunch Hour (1962)
- Bunny Lake Is Missing (1965)
- A Flea in Her Ear (1968)
- John and Mary (1969)
- Edwin (1984, TV film)
- Maschenka (1987) (Vladimir Nabokov novel adaptation directed by John Goldschmidt)
- Tea With Mussolini (1999)

== Sources ==
- The Radio Companion by Paul Donovan, HarperCollins (1991) ISBN 0-246-13648-0
- Halliwell's Television Companion, Third edition, Grafton (1986) ISBN 0-246-12838-0
- Who's Who in the Theatre, 17th edition, ed Ian Herbert, Gale (1981) ISBN 0-8103-0235-7
- John Mortimer: The Devil's Advocate by Graham Lord, Orion (2005) ISBN 0-7528-6655-9
