= Rumpole of the Bailey =

British television drama series (1978–1992)

- Caricature of Leo McKern as Horace Rumpole from the episode "Rumpole and the Younger Generation"
- Genre: Courtroom drama
- Created by: John Mortimer
- Starring: Leo McKern
- Theme music composer: Joseph Horovitz
- Country of origin: United Kingdom
- Original language: English
- No. of series: 7
- No. of episodes: 44 (list of episodes)

Production
- Running time: c. 50 minutes
- Production companies: BBC (play); Thames Television (series)

Original release
- Network: BBC1
- Release: 17 December 1975
- Network: ITV
- Release: 3 April 1978 – 3 December 1992

Rumpole of the Bailey is a British television series created and written by the British writer and barrister John Mortimer. It stars Leo McKern as Horace Rumpole, a middle-aged London barrister who defends a broad variety of clients, often underdogs. The popularity of the TV series led to the stories being presented in other media, including books and radio.

The "Bailey" of the title is a reference to the Central Criminal Court, the "Old Bailey".

== Characters ==
=== Horace Rumpole ===
While certain biographical details differ slightly between the original television series and the subsequent book series, Horace Rumpole has a number of definite character traits that are constant. First and foremost, he loves the courtroom. Despite attempts by his friends and family to get him to move on to a more respectable position for his age, such as a Queen's Counsel (QC) or a Circuit Judge (positions Rumpole sarcastically calls "Queer Customers" and "Circus Judges"), he only enjoys defending his clients (who are often legal aid cases) at the Old Bailey, London's Central Criminal Court: "the honour of being an Old Bailey Hack", as he describes his work. A devotee of Arthur Quiller-Couch's Oxford Book of English Verse, he often quotes Wordsworth (and other poets less frequently, e.g. Shakespeare). He privately refers to his wife, Hilda, as "She Who Must Be Obeyed", a reference to the fearsome queen in H. Rider Haggard's adventure novel She.

His skill at defending his clients is legendary among the criminal classes. The Timson clan of "minor villains" (primarily thieves) regularly rely on Rumpole to get them out of their latest bit of trouble with the law. Rumpole is proud of his successful handling of the Penge Bungalow Murders "alone and without a leader" (that is, as a "junior" barrister without a QC) early in his career and of his extensive knowledge of bloodstains and typewriters. Cross-examination is one of his favourite activities, and he disdains barristers who lack either the skill or courage to ask the right questions. His courtroom zeal gets him into trouble from time to time. Often, his investigations reveal more than his client wants him to know. Rumpole's chanciest encounters stem from arguing with judges, particularly those who seem to believe that being on trial implies guilt or that the police are infallible.

Rumpole enjoys smoking inexpensive cigars (cheroots), drinking cheap red wine and a diet of fried breakfasts, overboiled vegetables and steak and kidney pudding. Every day he visits "Pomeroy's", a wine bar on Fleet Street within walking distance of the Old Bailey and his chambers at Equity Court, at which he contributes regularly to an ever-increasing bar tab by purchasing glasses of red wine of questionable quality, which he calls variously "Cooking Claret", "Pomeroy's Plonk", "Pomeroy's Very Ordinary", "Chateau Thames Embankment", or "Chateau Fleet Street".

His cigar smoking is often the subject of debate within his chambers. His peers sometimes criticise his attire, noting his old, battered Homburg hat, imperfectly aligned clothes, cigar ash trailing down his waistcoat and faded barrister's wig, "bought second hand from a former Chief Justice of Tonga" (or the Windward Islands: Rumpole is occasionally an unreliable narrator).

Despite his affection for the criminal classes, Rumpole has firm ethics. He is a staunch believer in the presumption of innocence, the "Golden Thread of British Justice". He often reinforces this by proclaiming that it is better for ten guilty men to go free than for one innocent to be convicted (essentially Blackstone's formulation).

Accordingly, Rumpole's credo is "I never plead guilty", although he has qualified that credo by stating on several occasions that he is morally bound to enter a guilty plea if he knows for a fact that the defendant is guilty of the crime of which they are accused (in fact, he enters a guilty plea on behalf of his clients in "Rumpole's Last Case"). But if he has any doubt whatsoever about the facts surrounding the commission of the crime, even if the defendant has confessed to the deed (having stated, and proved, on one occasion that "there is no piece of evidence more unreliable than a confession!"), Rumpole feels equally honour bound to enter a plea of "not guilty" and offer the best defence possible. His "never plead guilty" credo also prevents him from making deals that involve pleading guilty to lesser charges (again, with some exceptions; in "Rumpole and the Tap End" he persuades his client to plead guilty to assault in exchange for the dismissal of a charge of attempted murder). Rumpole also refuses to prosecute, feeling it more important to defend the accused than to work to imprison them. There was one exception, when Rumpole took on a private prosecution, working for a private citizen rather than for the crown, but he proved that the defendant was innocent and then reaffirmed, "from now on, Rumpole only defends".

Some of Rumpole's clients feel that things would have been better for them if they had been found guilty and resent him for getting them off.

Mortimer's 2009 obituary in The Daily Telegraph confirmed that Rumpole was, in part, based on a chance meeting in court with James Burge QC:

In the early 1970s Mortimer was appearing for some football hooligans when James Burge, with whom he was sharing the defence, told him: "I'm really an anarchist at heart, but I don't think even my darling old Prince Peter Kropotkin would have approved of this lot." "And there," Mortimer realised, "I had Rumpole."

==== Biographical information (television) ====
In the television series, where Rumpole first appeared, there is some consistency with regard to Rumpole's backstory. The original play is set in 1974, and Rumpole says he is 64 years old, suggesting a birthdate of 1910 (Leo McKern, the actor who played Rumpole, was born in 1920). Rumpole's Oxford Book of English Verse is inscribed "Horace Rumpole, Little Wicks School 1923. Cursed be he who steals this book," (Series 4 – 1987); in Rumpole and the Fascist Beast it is mentioned that he studied at Birkenshaw School, which he calls "a wind-blasted penal colony on the Norfolk coast"; he bought his barrister's wig in 1932; first appeared in court in 1937; first met Hilda on 14 August 1938; served in the RAF Ground Staff in World War II; married Hilda in approximately 1944; won the Penge Bungalow Murder case in 1947; and had his son Nick in 1951. The series itself takes place between 1967 and 1992, when Rumpole is getting on in years.

==== Biographical information (books) ====
Within many short stories and occasional novels, which were written over a 29-year period (1978–2007), Rumpole's biographical details fluctuated. For example, in the first book, published in 1978, Rumpole mentions buying his wig in 1932, and another time to proposing to Hilda in 1938, and being "sixty-eight next birthday". This piece of information, along with the publication date would indicate a birth year of 1910-11, but later books contradict this. Rumpole and the Primrose Path, for instance, appeared in 2003 and was set in the present day, but Rumpole was in his seventies, not 92. Nonetheless, when in Rumpole and the Primrose Path Erskine-Brown asks Rumpole what he sings to himself when he is alone, Rumpole replies, "A ballad of the war years."

In general, in the book series, it would seem that Rumpole has been frozen at an age of around 70 years, and past events in his life have been adjusted to fit each story's time frame. Thus, in the books published in 1996 and before, he proposed to Hilda in 1938, and in books published in 2003 and after, it appears that he neither became a barrister nor met Hilda until after World War II ended in 1945. Rumpole and the Penge Bungalow Murders, containing his first unled case and his engagement to Hilda, takes place in the early 1950s, entirely inconsistent with the early stories. Since 1988, when Phyllida Erskine-Brown became a QC and "Soapy" Sam Ballard became Head of Chambers, the other characters seem to be similarly frozen in time. In Rumpole and the Reign of Terror, Rumpole was still practising in 2006, and Judge Bullingham was still in post – unless this is a different Bullingham, but that is never stated explicitly. In the 1990 story Rumpole at Sea, Rumpole says of Bullingham: "But now we have lost him." The prior "Mad Bull" was Roger Bullingham, and this Bullingham's name is Leonard.

The son of Reverend Wilfred Rumpole and his wife Alice, and born at Dulwich, Rumpole attended "Linklater's" (a fictional minor public school) and studied law at either Keble College or the fictional "St Joseph's College", Oxford, coming away with "a dubious third" (Oxford then awarded fourths, so a third is equivalent to a 2:2). Rumpole was called to the bar at the "Outer Temple" (a fictional Inn of Court, named on the analogy of the Inner Temple, where John Mortimer was called, and the Middle Temple).

=== Rumpole's family ===
Apart from the legal drama in each story, Rumpole also has to deal with his relationships with family and friends. His wife Hilda (whom he refers to as "She Who Must Be Obeyed") was proud of her "daddy" (as she calls him), C. H. Wystan, who was Rumpole's Head of Chambers, and she frequently advocates that Rumpole seek a higher position in the legal world such as Head of Chambers, Queen's Counsel or a judgeship. The Rumpoles reside in a cavernous, underheated mansion flat at 25B Froxbury Mansions (sometimes called Froxbury Court), Gloucester Road, London.

Rumpole raises tensions with his American daughter-in-law Erica (Deborah Fallender) because of their differing views (such as her disapproval of his cross-examining a rape victim he believed to be lying). His associates' dynamic social positions contrast with his relatively static views, which causes feelings between him and the others to shift over time.

Rumpole retired for a short period of time, moving to Florida to be near his son Nick, a sociology professor and now department head at the University of Miami. Nick is described by Rumpole as "the brains of the family". Nick was educated at public school as a teenager, then studied at Oxford University and Princeton. His academic visit to Baltimore University was determinant for staying in the U.S. Rumpole often says that Nick is proud of his father's work in criminal law, and enjoyed his accounts of his cases and "harmless legal anecdotes".

== Cast ==
In total, seven series of Rumpole of the Bailey were made from 1978 to 1992, each consisting of six episodes. A special two-hour film, Rumpole's Return, was made and aired in 1980, between the second and third series. The author, John Mortimer, occasionally appeared as an extra.

Character	P	Series 1						Series 2						S	Series 3						Series 4						Series 5						Series 6						Series 7					
Character	P	1	2	3	4	5	6	1	2	3	4	5	6	S	1	2	3	4	5	6	1	2	3	4	5	6	1	2	3	4	5	6	1	2	3	4	5	6	1	2	3	4	5	6
Horace Rumpole																																												
Hilda Rumpole																																												
Nicholas Rumpole																																												
Erica Rumpole																																												
Barristers and staff of No. 3 Equity Court
Guthrie Featherstone QC																	V																											
Sam Ballard QC																																												
Phyllida Erskine-Brown QC																																												
Claude Erskine-Brown																																												
T.C. "Uncle Tom" Rowley																																												
George Frobisher																																												
Percy Hoskins																																												
Fiona Allways																																												
Liz Probert																																												
Dave Inchcape																																												
Albert Handyside																																												
Henry Trench																																												
Dianne																																												
Dot Clapton																																												
Rumpole's legal and judicial allies and adversaries
Judge Bullingham																																												
Mr Justice Vosper																																												
Mr Justice Graves																																												
Mr Justice Oliphant																																												
Mr Bernard																																												
Mr Myers																																												
Det. Inspector Brush																																												
The Timson Clan of minor South London villains
Fred Timson																																												
Dennis Timson																																												
Cyril Timson																																												
Jim Timson																																												
Percy Timson																																												
Hugh Timson																																												
Nigel Timson																																												
Tony Timson																																												
Cary Timson																																												
Others
Jack Pomeroy																																												
Marigold Featherstone																																												
Dodo Mackintosh																																												
"Fig" Newton																																												
Marguerite Ballard																																												
Mr Keith																																												
Peter "Peanuts" Molloy																																												
Character	P	1	2	3	4	5	6	1	2	3	4	5	6	S	1	2	3	4	5	6	1	2	3	4	5	6	1	2	3	4	5	6	1	2	3	4	5	6	1	2	3	4	5	6
Character	P	Series 1						Series 2						S	Series 3						Series 4						Series 5						Series 6						Series 7					

Rumpole and his family:

- Horace W. Rumpole: Self-described "Old Bailey hack" who defends any and all clients, and never pleads guilty. His strong preference is for criminal cases, but Rumpole has occasionally taken on family law and libel cases. He usually defends clients dependent on legal aid, but sometimes represents paying clients, which he calls "money briefs". He loves quoting poetry, especially works by William Wordsworth and other poems from The Oxford Book of English Verse.
- Hilda Rumpole (Joyce Heron) (Original Play for Today "Pilot"); (Peggy Thorpe-Bates) (Series 1–3 and Special); (Marion Mathie) (Series 4–7): Privately referred to by Rumpole as "She Who Must Be Obeyed" – a reference to the Rider Haggard novel She. She always refers to her husband as just "Rumpole". She would dearly love to see Rumpole become a QC, Head of Chambers or a judge – none of which is a role to which Rumpole aspires. She is the daughter of Rumpole's late head of chambers, C. H. Wystan.
- Nicholas Rumpole (David Yelland) (Play for Today, plus Series 1–2); (Ian Gelder) (Special only): "The brains of the family", as Rumpole calls him. Nick and his father are especially close. Nick studied PPE at Oxford and then sociology at Princeton. Married to an American, he eventually moves to the United States (first Baltimore, then Miami) to work as a professor of sociology.

Members of Rumpole's Chambers at 3 Equity Court, London:

- Sir Guthrie Featherstone QC (Peter Bowles) (Series 1–2, Special, and as an occasional guest star in series 3–7). The well-connected if occasionally feckless Head of Chambers, he "took silk" (becoming a Queen's Counsel) and was elected to Parliament as a Social Democratic Party member early in the series. Rumpole often mock-reverently calls him "our learned Head of Chambers, Guthrie Featherstone QC, MP". He is an alumnus of Marlborough College. He becomes a High Court judge after the third series and is embroiled in a number of controversies after being promoted to the bench. Although often in some way in opposition to Rumpole, the two get on far better than do Rumpole and Ballard; Featherstone lacks Ballard's piousness, to which Rumpole takes great exception.
- Samuel Ballard QC (Peter Blythe) (Series 3–7): Head of Chambers in later series; a very pious and priggish person, and like his predecessor, a Marlborough alumnus. Rumpole refers to him as "Soapy Sam" which is an allusion to a much-parodied 19th century Bishop of Oxford, and generally addresses him as "Bollard". Later became a judge in the ecclesiastical courts, while maintaining his role as Head of Chambers.
- Phyllida (née Trant) Erskine-Brown QC (Patricia Hodge) (Series 1–2, Special, and as an occasional guest star in series 3–7). First appeared in episode four in the first series as Erskine-Brown's (and later Rumpole's) pupil, Phyllida Trant. The "Portia of our Chambers", Phyllida is a strong advocate with definite opinions of her own. Usually, but not always, sides with Rumpole in Chambers matters. She eventually becomes a Q.C., then a Recorder, and then a High Court judge. She is shown to occasionally flirt with extramarital relationships, but considers Claude's positive points and remains in her marriage.
- Claude Leonard Erskine-Brown QC (Julian Curry): Phyllida's husband, "opera buff and hopeless cross-examiner", and sometime would-be philanderer. Although not lacking in personal ambition, he acknowledges his wife's drive and is more than willing to do the lion's share of looking after their children, stating that he'd be happy to move to a more paperwork-based role; he is eventually promoted to Assistant Recorder, and later Q.C., through Phyllida's manoeuvrings. Upon hearing of his promotion, Judge Graves remarked, "They must be handing out silk gowns with pounds of tea nowadays!" He particularly loves the operas of Wagner, and his and Phyllida's children are named Tristan and Isolde. He frowns upon Rumpole's clientele, having a largely civil practice, with only an occasional criminal prosecution. Despite this attitude, Rumpole helps Erskine-Brown out in important personal matters without Erskine-Brown's knowledge, and is displeased when he makes the acquaintance of one of Erskine-Brown's schoolmates, who mentions that since Erskine-Brown was a "pill" at school he warranted bullying. He attended Bogstead School, Winchester College and New College, Oxford.
- T.C. Rowley, widely known as "Uncle Tom" (Richard Murdoch) (Series 1–6 and Special). "The oldest member of Chambers, who has not had a brief as long as any of us can remember." Rumpole first joined C. H. Wystan's chambers as Uncle Tom's pupil. He is usually seen happily practising his golf putting in the clerk's room, or offering cheerfully inappropriate comments in Chambers' meetings.
- George Frobisher (Moray Watson) (Series 1–2, Special, and as an occasional guest star in Series 3–5). A sensible if somewhat stiff barrister and Rumpole's closest friend in Chambers. At around the time he becomes a Circuit Judge, his love interest meets Rumpole, and fears he recognises her from an arson case years ago; she leaves Frobisher, with no way to get in contact. Although Frobisher admits he will find it hard to forgive Rumpole for this loss of happiness, in his next appearance, as a circuit judge presiding over a statutory rape case in which Rumpole is defending, he remains friendly, but refuses to bow to Rumpole's persuasion and jails the defendant; from this point on, Rumpole clearly has a jaundiced view of Frobisher in spite of the latter's friendly overtures, making barbed comments about what he considers Frobisher's draconian legal views in much the same way as he disdains other judges. A former Army officer, Frobisher becomes a Judge Advocate for the British Army in series 4; to Rumpole's dismay, he is pompously absorbed in the military legal way of doing things, and upbraids Rumpole on numerous occasions for not acting appropriately.
- Percy Hoskins (Norman Ettlinger) (Series 1, Episode 1 only); (Denys Graham) (Series 3–6): A rather minor character, Hoskins seems chiefly concerned with keeping other lawyers from being admitted to Chambers, lest they take away his work. Often prefaces his arguments with the phrase "Speaking as a man with daughters..." Later promoted to a judgeship.
- Fiona Allways (Rosalyn Landor) (Series 3 only): Originally Phyllida Erskine-Brown's pupil, Rumpole took a liking to her, mentored her, and got her admitted to Chambers. A daughter of the landed gentry, the character left Chambers to get married and was replaced by Liz Probert.
- Liz Probert (Samantha Bond) (Series 4); (Abigail McKern, Leo McKern's daughter) (Series 5–7): An outspoken young feminist barrister in Rumpole's chambers, who describes herself as a "young radical" and is referred to by Rumpole as "Miz Liz". Her father "Red Ron" is a prominent trade union official. Rumpole's wife Hilda once suspected him of having an affair with Liz. Introduced in episode 2 in series 4 and becomes Rumpole's pupil.
- Dave Inchcape: (Michael Grandage) (Series 5, Episode 6 only); (Christopher Milburn) (Series 6–7): A young lawyer who has a sometimes stormy relationship with "Miz Liz". He is later revealed to be the Honourable David Luxton.
- Charles Hearthstoke: (Nicholas Gecks) (Series 4, Episodes 4, 6);(Martin Turner) (Series 5, Episode 4): Called "Hearthrug" by Rumpole. Another young lawyer, brought in by Ballard at least in part to streamline the operations of Chambers, a move Rumpole and Henry both opposed for differing reasons. Hearthstoke woos Liz Probert during his stint in Chambers, but is ultimately forced out by Rumpole. After departing, he is later tempted to return by the possibility of a romantic "adventure" with Phyllida. Rumpole's intervention prevents this.

Other Staff at 3 Equity Court, London:

- Albert Handyside (Derek Benfield) (Series 1–2 and Special): The original clerk of Chambers. Fired in the third episode, he remains friendly with Rumpole and gets him the occasional case from the firm of solicitors that he joins as a clerk.
- Henry Trench (Jonathan Coy): Albert's successor as the efficient but harried clerk of Chambers. Unhappily married, Henry is also an amateur dramatics enthusiast, frequently appearing in works by Noël Coward. Henry's wife is active in local politics and serves as a member and later mayor of their local borough council.
- Dianne (Maureen Darbyshire) (Series 1–6 and Special): The oft-seen but rarely heard Chambers secretary, and Henry's flame. She eventually leaves Chambers and marries.
- Dot Clapton (Camille Coduri) (Series 7): The new Chambers secretary after Diane leaves. A friendly chatterbox, especially in contrast to the quiet Diane.

Frequent courtroom allies and adversaries:

- Mr Bernard (Edward de Souza) (Series 1); (Denis Lill) (Series 3–7): An instructing solicitor who frequently presents Rumpole with clients – often a hapless member of the Timson clan. Known to Rumpole as "Bonny Bernard".
- His Honour Judge Roger Bullingham (Bill Fraser) (Series 1–4 and Special): "The Mad Bull", Rumpole's most notorious courtroom enemy. Noted for his intense dislike of defending barristers in general, and of Rumpole in particular.
- Mr Justice Vosper (Donald Eccles) (Series 2): A humourless, elderly judge who does not like Rumpole.
- Detective Inspector Brush (Struan Rodger) (Series 2–5): A police officer intent on seeing accused criminals put away. Rumpole is generally contemptuous of Inspector Brush and his "unreliable notebook".
- Mr Justice Gerald Graves (Robin Bailey) (Series 4–7): Another in a long line of judges who dislikes Rumpole's courtroom theatrics. Privately referred to by Rumpole as "Mr. Justice Gravestone", and once referred to as "Mr. Injustice Death's Head". Originally merely Judge Graves, elevated to high court status in the series 6 episode "Rumpole at Sea".
- Mr Justice Oliver Oliphant (James Grout) (Series 6–7): A judge whose affectations of Northern bluntness and "common sense" drive Rumpole to distraction and disdain.

Others in Rumpole's life:

- Lady Marigold Featherstone (Joanna Van Gyseghem): Guthrie's social-climbing wife.
- Fred Timson (Peter Childs) (Series 1–2); (John Bardon) (Series 4–7): Head of the Timson clan, a family of "minor South London villains". The Timsons, who specialise in non-violent petty theft, often turn to Rumpole to defend them against charges arising from their latest brush with the law. Although many Timsons are seen through the course of the series, only Fred and Dennis (below) are series regulars.
- Dennis Timson (Ron Pember) (Series 4–7): Another member of the Timson clan who frequently requires Rumpole's services, either for himself or for a family member.
- Tony Timson (Ray Brooks) (Series 3, Episode 4); (Phil Davis) (Series 5, Episode 4): Yet another member of the Timson clan, this one features prominently in "Rumpole and the Female of the Species" and "Rumpole and the Tap End".
- Peter "Peanuts" Molloy (David Squire) (Series 1, Episode1; Series 4, Episode 6; Series 5, Episode 4): Member of the Molloy family, archrivals of the Timsons. This legume-lover has frequent run-ins with the law. Also known to date April Timson, wife of Tony Timson.
- Jack Pomeroy (Peter Whitaker) (Series 1); (Eric Dodson) (Series 3–5): Owner of Pomeroy's Wine Bar, to which Rumpole often repairs for a glass of "Pomeroy's Plonk".
- Keith (Peter Cartwright) (Series 2 and 5): Almost invariably referred to as "Old Keith from the Lord Chancellor's office". Has the ear of the Lord Chancellor, and is largely responsible (it seems) for determining who will be promoted to Queen's Counsel, or to judgeships.
- Dodo Mackintosh (Ann Way) (Series 3–5): A school friend of Hilda's who is often mentioned. Barely tolerated by Rumpole, she stops by to visit the Rumpoles on several occasions. Her maiden name is Dodo Perkins.
- F. I. G. "Fig" Newton (Full name: Ferdinand Isaac Gerald Newton) (Jim Norton) (Series 3); (Frank Mills) (Series 5–6): Rumpole's favourite private investigator, who is usually battling a cold as he's often called on to tail suspects through the pouring rain. In his first appearance, when played by Norton, he introduces himself as Ferdinand Ian Gilmour Newton. All later appearances were by Mills, and in these appearances Rumpole refers to him as Ferdinand Isaac Gerald Newton.
- Marguerite "Matey" Ballard (Rowena Cooper) (Series 5–7): The matron of the Old Bailey and widow of Mr Plumstead, who later becomes "Soapy Sam" Ballard's incongruously blunt wife.

== Production ==
=== Origins ===
The origins of Rumpole of the Bailey lie in "Infidelity Took Place", a one-off television play for the BBC's 1960s television anthology drama series, The Wednesday Play that was written by John Mortimer and broadcast by BBC TV on 18 May 1968. This satirical play, a comment on newly enacted English divorce laws, told the story of a happily married couple who decide to get divorced to take advantage of the more beneficial tax situation they would enjoy if legally separated. The play features a character, Leonard Hoskins (played by John Nettleton), a divorce lawyer with a domineering mother, who can be seen as an early prototype of Rumpole. Mortimer also drew parallels with his 1957 radio play "The Dock Brief", in which elderly and unsuccessful barrister Morganhall (Michael Hordern) is called upon to defend a man, Fowle (David Kossoff), accused of murder. Morganhall hopes that a not guilty verdict will bring him the fame that has so far eluded him, but when Fowle is convicted and sentenced to death, he is granted a reprieve on the grounds of Morganhall's desultory performance in court.

In the mid-1970s, Mortimer approached BBC producer Irene Shubik, who had overseen "Infidelity Took Place" and who was now one of the two producers overseeing Play For Today – the successor series to The Wednesday Play as the BBC's strand for contemporary drama. Mortimer presented an idea for a new play, titled "My Darling Prince Peter Kropotkin", that centred on a barrister called Horace Rumbold. Rumbold would have a particular interest in nineteenth-century anarchists, especially the Russian Peter Kropotkin from whom the title of the play was drawn. The character's name was later changed to Horace Rumpole when it was discovered that there was a real barrister called Horace Rumbold. The title of the play was briefly changed to "Jolly Old Jean Jacques Rousseau" before settling on the less esoteric "Rumpole of the Bailey".

Mortimer was keen on Michael Hordern for the role of Rumpole. When Hordern proved unavailable, the part went to Australian-born actor Leo McKern. Mortimer was initially unenthusiastic about McKern's casting but changed his opinion upon seeing him at rehearsal. Cast as Hilda was Joyce Heron, who played the character as a much tougher individual than that later seen in the eventual series. Aside from Rumpole and his family, no other characters who would eventually be series regulars were seen in the Play For Today production of Rumpole of the Bailey—with the possible exception of a fellow lawyer named George, who could be an early version of eventual series character George Frobisher. (Note that in the series, George Frobisher was played in a very different style by a different actor).

Rumpole of the Bailey made its television debut on 17 December 1975 to good reviews by the critics.

=== The series ===
Aware of the potential for further stories centred on Rumpole, Irene Shubik approached the BBC's Head of Plays, Christopher Morahan, and obtained permission from him to commission a further six Rumpole of the Bailey scripts from John Mortimer. However, Morahan left his post at the BBC a short time later and his successor was not interested in turning Rumpole of the Bailey into a series. At around this time, Shubik was contacted by Verity Lambert, Head of Drama at Thames Television, who was looking for ideas for an up-market drama series. Impressed with Rumpole of the Bailey, Lambert offered Shubik the opportunity to bring the series to Thames. John Mortimer readily agreed, since it would mean more money, and Shubik (and Rumpole) duly left the BBC in late 1976.

Rumpole of the Bailey made its Thames Television debut on 3 April 1978 in a series of six episodes. These introduced and established the supporting characters including Guthrie Featherstone (Peter Bowles), Claude Erskine-Browne (Julian Curry) and Phyllida Trant (Patricia Hodge). The role of Hilda was recast, with Peggy Thorpe-Bates taking on the part. Other than McKern, David Yelland (who played Rumpole's son Nick) was the only cast member from the BBC Play For Today who also became a regular in the series.

Rob Page's title sequence, featuring amusing caricatures of Rumpole, was inspired by the nineteenth-century cartoonist George Cruikshank, who had illustrated the works of Charles Dickens. The music was composed by Joseph Horovitz, whose extensive use of the bassoon for Rumpole's theme complemented Leo McKern's portly stature and sonorous voice. Mortimer continued to work as a barrister while writing the series, rising at 5:30am to write scripts before going to work at the Old Bailey. The series was critically acclaimed ("Not to be missed. Leo McKern is superb as the wild and witty barrister Rumpole" – The Times; "I wouldn't say the BBC threw away a pearl richer than all its tribe but it has mislaid a tasty box of kippers" – Nancy Banks-Smith, The Guardian) and Thames quickly commissioned a second series. However, upset to see that her pay had reduced while McKern and Mortimer had received increases for the second series, Shubik's relationship with Verity Lambert deteriorated and, in the end, she quit Thames after commissioning three of the six scripts for the second series. Shubik moved to Granada Television, where she produced an adaptation of Paul Scott's Staying On and set up, but did not produce, The Jewel in the Crown, the follow-up adaptation of Scott's Raj Quartet. Rumpole of the Bailey continued under a new production team.

When Rumpole of the Bailey returned for its fourth series in 1987, Marion Mathie took over as Hilda when Peggy Thorpe-Bates retired because of poor health.

In 2026, production designer Bill Palmer, floor manager Julian Meers, camera supervisor Chas Watts and stage managers Marilyn Edwards and Nigel J. Wilson shared their memories of the production of Rumpole of the Bailey in the article Rumpole and the Production Team by Oliver Crocker for the March edition of Best of British magazine.

=== Locations ===
"Number 3 Equity Court", Rumpole's chambers, are in King's Bench Walk in the Inner Temple Inns of Court. Mortimer, however, has also given the address as "Number Two Equity Court", as in Chapter Two of the 1980 novel Rumpole's Return; or "4 Equity Court", as in the 2005 story "Rumpole and Father Christmas", later compiled in the UK collection Rumpole At Christmas (entitled A Rumpole Christmas in the United States). According to the story "Rumpole and the Younger Generation", Horace and Hilda Rumpole live in a "mansion flat" at 25B Froxbury Court, Gloucester Road, a building sometimes referred to as Froxbury Mansions.

== Episodes ==
Series	Episodes	Originally released	
Series	Episodes	First released	Last released
Special		16 December 1975	
1	6	3 April 1978	15 May 1978
2	6	29 May 1979	3 July 1979
Special		30 December 1980	
3	6	11 October 1983	15 November 1983
4	6	19 January 1987	25 February 1987
5	6	23 November 1988	28 December 1988
6	6	28 October 1991	2 December 1991
7	6	29 October 1992	3 December 1992

== Home media ==
The seven series of the programme and the Rumpole's Return special episode are available on DVD and as part of a single DVD box set, published by Fremantle Media. The Play for Today (The Confession of Guilt) is also available on DVD, released separately by Acorn Media.

A&E Home Video released the entire series on DVD in Region 1 between 2004 and 2006. It was initially released in season sets then on 28 February 2006, they released Rumpole of the Bailey a 14-disc box set with all 42 episodes.

== In other media ==
=== Radio ===
Since 1980 there were a number of different BBC radio productions derived from the Rumpole stories. Essentially there were two different series and three Christmas specials – yielding a grand total of 40 episodes. Five different actors portrayed Horace Rumpole in these episodes: Leo McKern, Maurice Denham, Timothy West, Benedict Cumberbatch, and Julian Rhind-Tutt.

In 1997, abridged readings of two Rumpole stories from Rumpole for the Defence ("Rumpole and the Dearly Departed" and "Rumpole and the Boat People"), abridged by Bob Sinfield and performed by Leo McKern, were broadcast on BBC Radio 2, subsequently rebroadcast on BBC Radio 4 Extra.

=== Books ===
John Mortimer adapted his television scripts into a series of short stories and novels starting in 1978. A series of anthologies and omnibus editions were also released.
