= Alec Guinness on stage and screen =

List of performances by the English actor

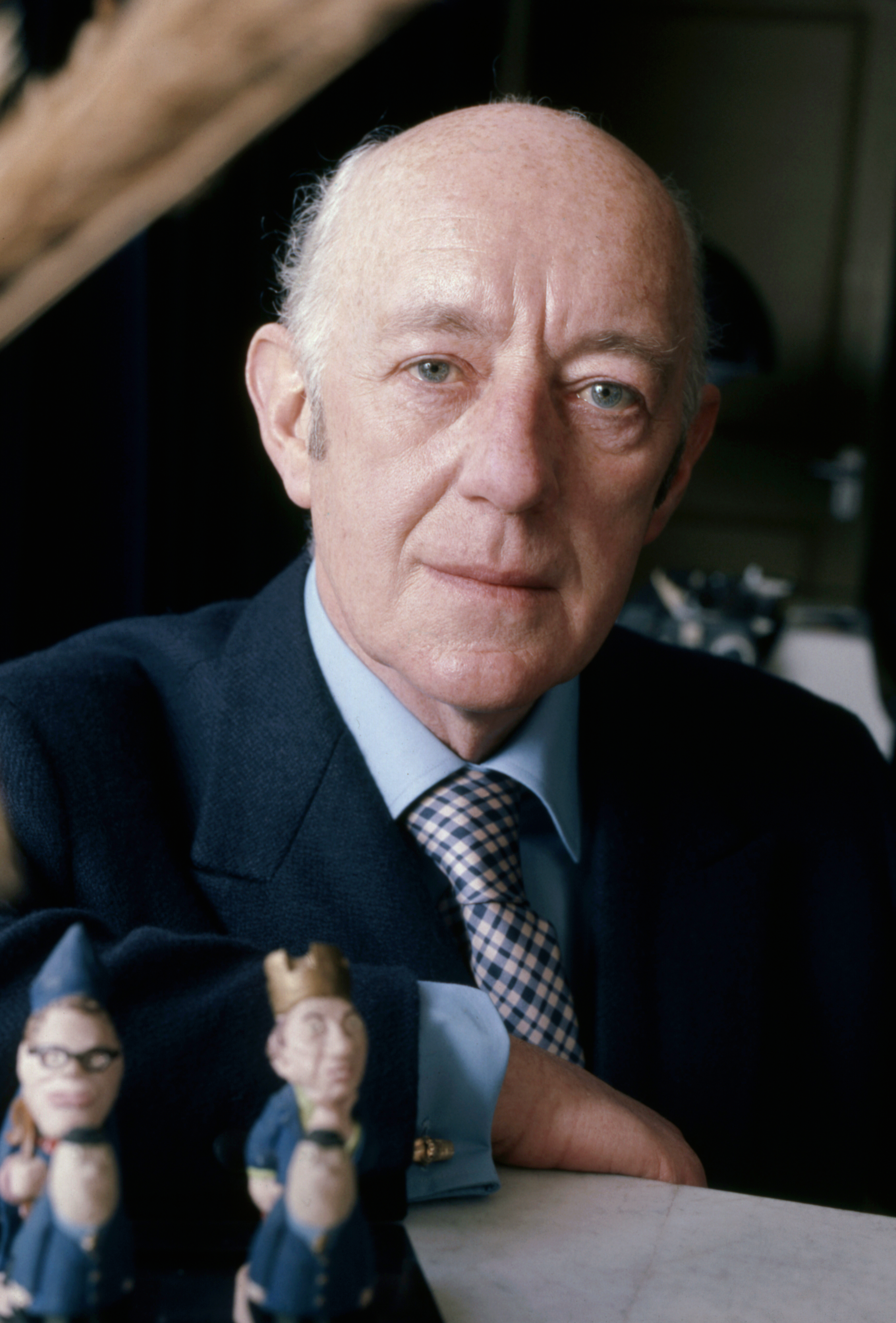
Alec Guinness in 1973, by Allan Warren

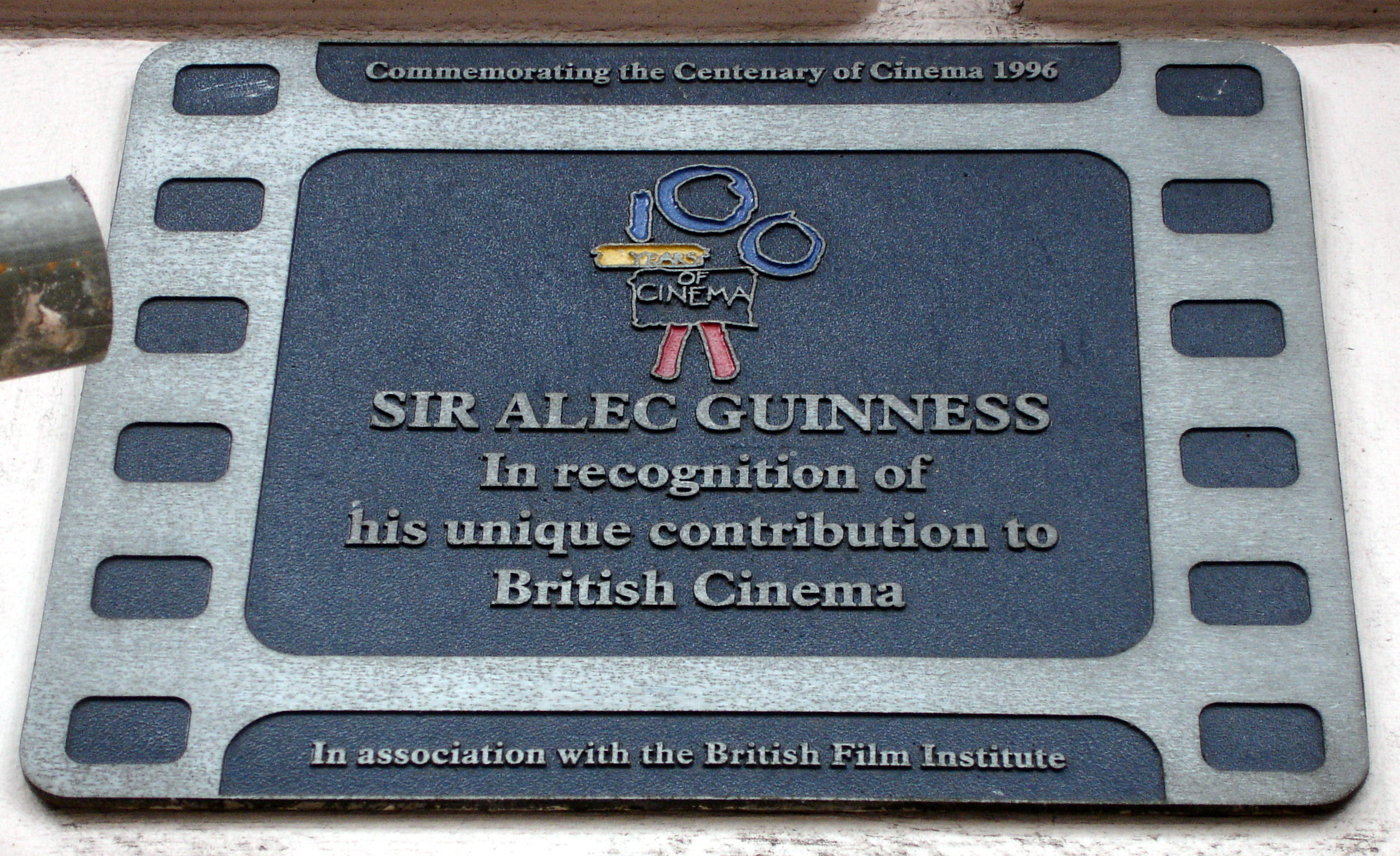
Plaque installed by the British Film Institute in the City of Westminster, London in recognition of Guinness's contribution to British cinema

Sir Alec Guinness, CH, CBE (1914–2000) was an English actor. Known for his extensive roles on stage and film, he has earned acclaim for his numerous collaborations with David Lean and his work in the Ealing Comedies. He is also known for his role as Obi-Wan Kenobi in the Star Wars franchise starting from 1977. In the BFI Top 100 British films listing, Guinness was single most noted actor, represented across nine films — six in starring roles and three in supporting roles. He received several honors including an Academy Honorary Award, a BAFTA Fellowship and a BFI Fellowship.

After an early career on the stage, Guinness made a name for himself in six Ealing Comedies, starting in 1949 with both A Run for Your Money and Kind Hearts and Coronets — in which he played nine different characters — going on to lead roles in The Lavender Hill Mob and The Man in the White Suit both in 1951, The Ladykillers in 1955, and culminating with Barnacle Bill in 1957.

Guinness is known for his six collaborations with David Lean: Herbert Pocket in Great Expectations (1946), Fagin in Oliver Twist (1948), Col. Nicholson in The Bridge on the River Kwai (1957, for which he won the Academy Award for Best Actor), Prince Faisal in Lawrence of Arabia (1962), General Yevgraf Zhivago in Doctor Zhivago (1965), and Professor Godbole in A Passage to India (1984).

Guinness is also known for his portrayal of Obi-Wan Kenobi in George Lucas's original Star Wars trilogy; for his performance in the original 1977 film, he was nominated as Best Supporting Actor for the Academy Award and Golden Globe.

Guinness continued his acting in theatre throughout his working life, but his later life was closely associated with his definitive depiction of the leading role of George Smiley in the two BBC television series of Tinker, Tailor, Soldier, Spy and Smiley's People by John le Carré.

== Acting credits ==
=== Film ===
Year	Title	Role	Director	Notes
1934	Evensong	N/A	Victor Saville	Uncredited extra
1946	Great Expectations	Herbert Pocket (adult)	David Lean	
1948	Oliver Twist	Fagin	David Lean	
1949	Kind Hearts and Coronets	Various roles (Note: The Duke / The Banker The Parson / The General The Admiral / Young D'Ascoyne Young Henry, Lady Agatha)	Robert Hamer	
1949	A Run for Your Money	Whimple	Charles Frend	
1950	Last Holiday	George Bird	Henry Cass	
1950	The Mudlark	Benjamin Disraeli	Jean Negulesco	
1951	The Lavender Hill Mob	Henry Holland	Charles Crichton	
1951	The Man in the White Suit	Sidney Stratton	Alexander Mackendrick	
1952	The Card	Edward Henry 'Denry' Machin	Ronald Neame	
1953	The Square Mile	Narrator		Short subject
1953	The Captain's Paradise	Capt. Henry St. James	Anthony Kimmins	
1953	Malta Story	Flight Lieutenant Peter Ross RAF	Brian Desmond Hurst	
1954	Father Brown	Father Brown	Robert Hamer	
1954	The Stratford Adventure	Himself	Morten Parker	Short subject
1955	Rowlandson's England	Narrator	Robert Hamer	Short subject
1955	To Paris with Love	Col. Sir Edgar Fraser	Robert Hamer	
1955	The Prisoner	The Cardinal	Peter Glenville	
1955	The Ladykillers	Professor Marcus	Alexander Mackendrick	
1956	The Swan	Prince Albert	Charles Vidor	
1957	The Bridge on the River Kwai	Col. Nicholson	David Lean	
1957	Barnacle Bill	Captain William Horatio Ambrose	Charles Frend	
1958	The Horse's Mouth	Gulley Jimson	Ronald Neame	
1959	The Scapegoat	John Barratt/Jacques De Gue	Robert Hamer	
1959	Our Man in Havana	Jim Wormold	Carol Reed	
1960	Tunes of Glory	Maj. Jock Sinclair, D.S.O., M.M.	Ronald Neame	
1961	A Majority of One	Koichi Asano	Mervyn LeRoy	
1962	H.M.S. Defiant	Captain Crawford	Lewis Gilbert	
1962	Lawrence of Arabia	Prince Faisal	David Lean	
1964	The Fall of the Roman Empire	Marcus Aurelius	Anthony Mann	
1965	Pasternak	Himself	Thomas Craven	Short subject
1965	Situation Hopeless... But Not Serious	Wilhelm Frick	Gottfried Reinhardt	
1965	Doctor Zhivago	Yevgraf Andreyevich Zhivago	David Lean	
1966	Hotel Paradiso	Benedict Boniface	Peter Glenville	
1966	The Quiller Memorandum	Pol	Michael Anderson	
1967	The Comedians in Africa	Himself	Peter Glenville	Short subject; Uncredited
1967	The Comedians	Major H.O. Jones	Peter Glenville	
1970	Cromwell	King Charles I	Ken Hughes	
1970	Scrooge	Jacob Marley's ghost	Ronald Neame	
1972	Brother Sun, Sister Moon	Pope Innocent III	Franco Zeffirelli	
1973	Hitler: The Last Ten Days	Adolf Hitler	Ennio De Concini	
1976	Murder by Death	Jamesir Bensonmum	Robert Moore	
1977	Star Wars	Obi-Wan Kenobi	George Lucas	
1980	The Empire Strikes Back	Obi-Wan Kenobi	Irvin Kershner	
1980	Raise the Titanic	John Bigalow	Jerry Jameson	
1983	Lovesick	Sigmund Freud	Marshall Brickman	
1983	Return of the Jedi	Obi-Wan Kenobi	Richard Marquand	
1984	A Passage to India	Professor Godbole	David Lean	
1987	Little Dorrit	William Dorrit	Christine Edzard	
1988	A Handful of Dust	Mr. Todd	Charles Sturridge	
1991	Kafka	The Chief Clerk	Steven Soderbergh	
1994	Mute Witness	The Reaper	Anthony Waller	
2015	Star Wars: The Force Awakens	Obi-Wan Kenobi (voice)	J.J. Abrams	Posthumous release; archival audio
2019	Star Wars: The Rise of Skywalker	Obi-Wan Kenobi (voice)	J.J. Abrams	Posthumous release; archival audio

=== Television ===
Year	Title	Role	Notes
1955	Baker's Dozen	The Major	Television film
1959	Ford Startime	Jebal Deeks	Episode: The Wicked Scheme of Jebal Deeks
1969	Thirty-Minute Theatre	The Executioner	Episode: Conversation at Night
1970	ITV Sunday Night Theatre	Malvolio	Episode: Twelfth Night
1974	ITV Playhouse	Jocelyn Broome	Episode: The Gift of Friendship
1976	Caesar and Cleopatra	Julius Caesar	Television film
1979	Tinker Tailor Soldier Spy	George Smiley	Miniseries
1980	Little Lord Fauntleroy	Earl of Dorincourt	Television film
1982	Smiley's People	George Smiley	Miniseries
1984	Edwin	Sir Fennimore Truscott	Television film
1985	Monsignor Quixote	Monsignor Quixote	Television film
1992	Performance	Heinrich Mann	Episode: Tales from Hollywood
1993	Screen One	Amos	Episode: A Foreign Field
1996	Eskimo Day	James	Television film

=== Theatre ===
Stage credits of Guinness
Year	Production	Role	Theatre (London, unless otherwise noted)	Notes
1934	Libel!	Junior Counsel (non-speaking role)	Playhouse Theatre	
1934	Queer Cargo	Various roles (Note: Guinness portrayed Chinese coolie, a French Pirate and an English Sailor)	Piccadilly Theatre	
1934	Hamlet	Osric and Third Player	New Theatre	
1935	Noé/Noah	Wolf	New Theatre	
1935	Romeo and Juliet	Sampson and Apothecary	New Theatre	
1936	The Seagull	Workman then Yakov	New Theatre	
1936	Love's Labour's Lost	Boyet	The Old Vic	(Note: Start of a season with the Old Vic Company; September 1936 – April 1937.)
1936	As You Like It	Le Beau and William	The Old Vic	
1936	The Witch of Edmonton	Old Thorney	The Old Vic	
1937	Hamlet	Osric and Reynaldo	The Old Vic	
1937	Twelfth Night	Sir Andrew Aguecheek	The Old Vic	
1937	Henry V	Exeter	The Old Vic	
1937	Hamlet	Osric, Player Queen and Reynaldo	Elsinore Castle, Helsingør, Denmark	(Note: Put on by the Old Vic Company at Elsinore Castle)
1937	Richard II	Aumerle and The Groom	Queen's Theatre	(Note: Start of a season with John Gielgud's Company at the Queen's Theatre, September 1937 – May 1938.)
1937	The School for Scandal	Snake	Queen's Theatre	
1938	The Three Sisters	Fedotik	Queen's Theatre	
1938	The Merchant of Venice	Lorenzo	Queen's Theatre	
1938	The Doctor's Dilemma	Louis Dubedat	Richmond Theatre	
1938	Trelawny of the 'Wells'	Arthur Gower	The Old Vic	(Note: Start of a season with the Old Vic Company. September to December 1938.)
1938	Hamlet	Hamlet	The Old Vic	
1938	The Rivals	Bob Acres	The Old Vic	
1939	Hamlet	Hamlet	The Old Vic	(Note: Start of Tour of Europe and Egypt with the Old Vic Company. January to April 1939.)
1939	Henry V	Chorus	The Old Vic	Tour
1939	The Rivals	Bob Acres	The Old Vic	Tour
1939	Libel!	Emile Flordan	The Old Vic	Tour
1939	Macbeth	Macbeth	Sheffield Playhouse, Sheffield	
1939	The Ascent of F6	Michael Ransom	The Old Vic	
1939	Romeo and Juliet	Romeo	Perth Theatre, Perth, Scotland	(Note: Part of the first Perth Scottish Theatre Festival)
1939	Great Expectations	Herbert Pocket	Rudolf Steiner Hall	(Note: Version adapted by Guinness from Charles Dickens novel; Performed by The Actor's Company, a group Guinness had formed with George Devine and Marius Goring.)
1940	Cousin Muriel	Richard Meilhac	Globe Theatre	
1940	Saint Joan	The Dauphin	Palace Theatre	
1940	The Tempest	Ferdinand	The Old Vic	
1940	Thunder Rock	Charleston	Tour of England	
1940	Flare Path	Fl. Lt. Graham	Henry Miller's Theatre, Broadway (Note: Was temporarily released from his war service to perform in this production.)	
1946	The Brothers Karamazov	Mitya	Lyric Theatre	(Note: Adapted by Guinness from Fyodor Dostoevsky.)
1946	The Vicious Circle	Garcin	Arts Theatre	
1946	King Lear	The Fool	New Theatre	(Note: Start of a season with the Old Vic Company at the New Theatre. September 1946 – May 1947.)
1946	An Inspector Calls	Eric Birling	New Theatre	
1946	Cyrano De Bergerac	De Guiche	New Theatre	
1947	The Alchemist	Abel Drugger	New Theatre	
1947	Richard II	Richard II	New Theatre	(Note: Start of a season with the Old Vic Company at the New Theatre. September 1947 – May 1948.)
1947	Saint Joan	The Dauphin	New Theatre	
1948	The Government Inspector	Khlestakov	New Theatre	
1948	Coriolanus	Menenius Agrippa	New Theatre	
1948	Twelfth Night	-	New Theatre	(Note: Director only for the Old Vic Company at the New Theatre. September 1948.)
1949	The Human Touch	Dr. James Simpson	Savoy Theatre	
1949	The Cocktail Party	Sir Henry Harcourt-Reilly	Royal Lyceum Theatre, Edinburgh	
1950	The Cocktail Party	Sir Henry Harcourt-Reilly	Henry Miller's Theatre, Broadway	
1951	Hamlet	Hamlet	New Theatre	(Note: This production was also directed by Guinness.)
1952	Under the Sycamore Tree	The Ant Scientist	Aldwych Theatre	
1953	Richard III	Richard III	Stratford Festival, Stratford, Ontario, Canada	(Note: Start of a season at the Stratford Festival. July to September 1953.)
1953	All's Well That Ends Well	King of France	Stratford Festival, Stratford, Ontario, Canada	
1954	The Prisoner	The Cardinal	Globe Theatre	
1956	Hotel Paradiso	Boniface	Winter Garden Theatre	
1960	Ross	Aircraftman Ross / T. E. Lawrence	Theatre Royal Haymarket	
1963	Exit the King	Berenger the First	Royal Lyceum Theatre, Edinburgh and RCT	
1964	Dylan	Dylan Thomas	Plymouth Theatre, Broadway	
1966	Incident at Vichy	Von Berg	Phoenix Theatre	
1966	Macbeth	Macbeth	Royal Court Theatre	
1967	Wise Child	Jock Masters/Mrs. Artminster	Wyndham's Theatre	
1968	The Cocktail Party	Sir Henry Harcourt-Reilly	Chichester Festival Theatre, Sussex; Wyndham's Theatre, Royal Haymarket	(Note: Production was also directed by Guinness.)
1970	Time out of Mind	John	Yvonne Arnaud Theatre, Guildford, Surrey.	
1971	A Voyage Round My Father	Father	Theatre Royal Haymarket	
1973	Habeas Corpus	Dr. Wickstead	Lyric Theatre	
1975	A Family and a Fortune	Dudley	Apollo Theatre	
1976	Yahoo	Dean Swift	Queen's Theatre	(Note: Adapted by Guinness from the works of Jonathan Swift.)
1977	The Old Country	Hilary	Queen's Theatre	
1984	Merchant of Venice	Shylock	Chichester Festival Theatre	
1988	A Walk in the Woods	Andrey Botvinnik	Comedy Theatre	

== Sources ==
- O'Connor, Garry (2002). Alec Guinness: The Unknown. London: Sidgwick & Jackson. ISBN 0-283-07340-3.
- Taylor, John Russell (2000). Alec Guinness: A Celebration. London: Pavilion. ISBN 1-86205-501-7.
