= Rodney Bennett =

British television director

- Born: 24 March 1935; Chagford, Devon, England
- Died: 3 January 2017 (aged 81)
- Education: St John's College, Cambridge; University College London
- Occupation: Television director
- Employer(s): BBC and ITV
- Known for: Z-Cars; Doctor Who; Anything More Would Be Greedy; The Darling Buds of May

Rodney Bennett (24 March 1935 – 3 January 2017) was a British television director. He worked for BBC Radio and directed television programmes for the BBC and ITV.

== Early life and education ==
Bennett was born in Chagford, Devon, and raised in Totnes. He studied psychology at St John's College, Cambridge, and also received a master's degree from University College London.

== Career ==
Bennett began working for the BBC in radio and moved into television with the launch of BBC2. His subsequent work included directing episodes of Z-Cars and three Doctor Who stories, The Ark in Space, The Sontaran Experiment, (both 1975) and The Masque of Mandragora (1976). He also directed Derek Jacobi and Patrick Stewart in the BBC Shakespeare production of Hamlet in 1980. For ITV he directed the comedy-drama series Anything More Would Be Greedy in 1989 and episodes of The Darling Buds of May. Bennett was responsible for the casting of Catherine Zeta Jones, and launching her career.

== Television credits ==
- 1969. Thirty-Minute Theatre. Directed three installments, Anything You Say (Series 3, Ep. 32); Aggers and Torters: Part 1: Back to Nature (Series 5, Ep. 7) and Aggers and Torters: Part 3: Hickory Dickory (Series 5, Ep. 9).
- 1969. Z-Cars. Directed ten episodes: "Alibi: Part 1" (Series 6, Ep. 195); "Alibi: Part 2" (Series 6, Ep. 196); "No Objection to Bail: Part 1" (Series 6, Ep. 229); "No Objection to Bail: Part 2" (Series 6, Ep. 230); "You've Got to Keep Them Talking: Part 1" (Series 6, Ep. 237); "You've Got to Keep Them Talking: Part 2" (Series 6, Ep. 238); "Dear Old Golden Rule Days...: Part 1" (Series 6, Ep. 249); "Dear Old Golden Rule Days...: Part 2" (Series 6, Ep. 250); "It's Been a Long Time: Part 1" (Series 6, Ep. 257) and "It's Been a Long Time: Part 2" (Series 6, Ep. 258).
- 1970. Thirty-Minute Theatre. Directed one installment, Reparation (Series 5, Ep. 15).
- 1971. Thirty-Minute Theatre. Directed three installments, Asquith in Orbit (Series 6, Ep. 20); Gun Play (Series 7, Ep. 3) and Farewell Performance (Series 7, Ep. 13). Wrote Farewell Performance (Series 7, Ep. 13).
- 1971. Trial. Directed one episode.
- 1972. Dead of Night. Directed one episode, "Return Flight" (Series 1, Ep. 2).
- 1972. Mistress of Hardwick. Directed all ten episodes: "They Expect a New Queen" (Ep. 1); "Honest Sweet Chatsworth" (Ep. 2); "Dangerous Alliance" (Ep. 3); "My Jewel Arbelle" (Ep. 4); "The Shrewsbury Scandal" (Ep. 5); "An Insatiable Dream" (Ep. 6); "Cousin to King James" (Ep. 7); "This Costly Countess" (Ep. 8); "Royal Prisoner" (Ep. 9) and "When Hardwick Towers Shall Bow Their Heads" (Ep. 10).
- 1972. The Regiment. Directed one episode, "Days of Betrayal" (Series 1, Ep. 3).
- 1972. Thirty-Minute Theatre. Directed one installment, Swiss Cottage (Series 7, Ep. 31).
- 1973. Murder Must Advertise. Directed all four episodes.
- 1973. Scene. Produced one episode: "Blackout" (Series 6, Ep. 1).
- 1973. Thirty-Minute Theatre. Directed one installment, About a Bout (Series 8, Ep. 32).
- 1973. Z-Cars. Directed one episode: "Cadet" (Series 8, Ep. 4).
- 1974. The Case of Eliza Armstrong. Directed all six episodes: "The Committal, Bow Street, Days 1-5" (Ep. 1); "The Committal, Bow Street, Day 6" (Ep. 2); "The Trial, Old Bailey, the Prosecution Case" (Ep. 3); "The Trial, Old Bailey, Rebecca Jarrett" (Ep. 4); "The Trial, Old Bailey, Stead's Defence" (Ep. 5) and "The Trial, Old Bailey, the Summing Up" (Ep. 6). Wrote one episode: "The Committal, Bow Street, Days 1-5" (Ep. 1).
- 1974. Z-Cars. Directed two episodes: "Two Wise Monkeys" (Series 8, Ep. 17) and "Dinner Break" (Series 8, Ep. 18).
- 1975. Doctor Who serial The Ark in Space. Directed all four episodes.
- 1975. Doctor Who serial The Sontaran Experiment. Directed both episodes.
- 1975. Madame Bovary. Directed all four episodes.
- 1975. North and South. Directed all four episodes.
- 1976. Doctor Who serial The Masque of Mandragora. Directed all four episodes.
- 1978. BBC2 Play of the Week. Directed one installment, Forgotten Love Songs (Series 1, Ep. 9).
- 1978. The Lost Boys. Directed all three episodes: "We Set Out to be Wrecked" (Ep. 1); "Dark and Sinister Man" (Ep. 2) and "An Awfully Big Adventure" (Ep. 3).
- 1978. Rebecca of Sunnybrook Farm. Directed all four episodes.
- 1979. The Legend of King Arthur. Directed all eight episodes.
- 1979. Tales of the Unexpected. Directed one episode: "Edward the Conqueror" (Series 1, Ep. 7).
- 1980. BBC2 Playhouse. Directed one installment, Gentle Folk (Series 6, Ep. 9).
- 1980. The BBC Television Shakespeare. Directed two installments: The Tempest (Series 2, Ep. 5) and Hamlet, Price of Denmark (Series 2, Ep. 6).
- 1981. BBC2 Playhouse. Directed one installment, Autumn Sunshine (Series 8, Ep. 3).
- 1981. Sense and Sensibility. Directed all seven episodes.
- 1982. The Last Visitor. Director.
- 1982. Play for Today. Directed one installment, John David (Series 13, Ep. 6).
- 1982. Stalky & Co.. Directed all six episodes: "An Unsavoury Interlude" (Ep. 1); "In Ambush" (Ep. 2); "Slaves of the Lamp" (Ep. 3); "The Moral Reformeders" (Ep. 4); "A Little Prep" (Ep. 5) and "The Last term" (Ep. 6).
- 1983. Dombey and Son. Directed all ten episodes.
- 1984. Edwin. Director. Television film starring Alec Guinness, Renée Asherson and Paul Rogers.
- 1984. Love and Marriage. Directed one episode: "Dearly Beloved" (Series 1, Ep. 2).
- 1985. Love Song. Director. Television film starring Maurice Denham, Michael Kitchen and Constance Cummings.
- 1985. Monsignor Quixote. Director. Television film starring Alec Guinness, Leo McKern and Ian Richardson.
- 1987. Rumpole of the Bailey. Directed two episodes: "Rumpole and the Official Secret" (Series 4, Ep. 3) and "Rumpole's Last Case" (Series 4, Ep. 6).
- 1988. Tales of the Unexpected. Directed two episodes: "The Verger" (Series 9, Ep. 4) and "The Finger of Suspicion" (Series 9, Ep. 8).
- 1989. Anything More Would Be Greedy. Directed all six episodes: "Enigma Variations" (Ep. 1); "Trading Favours" (Ep. 2); "Playing Games" (Ep. 3); "Realizing Assets" (Ep. 4); "Second Term" (Ep. 5) and "Georgian Silver" (ep. 6).
- 1991. The Darling Buds of May. Directed two episodes: "The Darling Buds of May Part 1" (Series 1, Ep. 1) and "The Darling Buds of May Part 2" (Series 1, Ep. 2).
- 1991. The House of Eliott. Directed two episodes: (Series 1, Ep. 1) and (Series 1, Ep. 2).
- 1993. The Darling Buds of May. Directed two episodes: "Cast Not Your Pearls Before Swine Part 1" (Series 3, Ep. 3) and "Cast Not Your Pearls Before Swine Part 2" (Series 3, Ep. 4).
- 1993. Soldier Soldier. Directed two episodes: "Hide and Seek" (Series 3, Ep. 6) and "Staying Together" (Series 3, Ep. 10).
- 1994. Soldier Soldier. Directed two episodes: "Stormy Weather" (Series 4, Ep. 1) and "Away Games" (Series 4, Ep. 2).
- 1996. Doctor Finlay. Directed four episodes: "All Jock Tamson's Bairns" (Series 4, Ep. 1); "Home Truths" (Series 4, Ep. 2); "Days of Grace" (Series 4, Ep. 3) and "Snowblind" (Series 4, Ep. 8).
