= Monsignor Quixote =

1982 novel by Graham Greene

- First edition (UK)
- Author: Graham Greene
- Language: English
- Genre: Comedy novel
- Publisher: The Bodley Head (UK); Simon & Schuster (US)
- Publication date: 16 September 1982 (UK); 27 September 1982 (US)
- Publication place: United Kingdom
- Media type: Print (Hardcover)
- Pages: 221 pp
- ISBN: 0-671-45818-3
- OCLC: 8474441
- Dewey Decimal: 823/.912 19
- LC Class: PR6013.R44 M6 1982

Monsignor Quixote is a novel by Graham Greene, published in 1982. The book is a pastiche of the early 1600s novel Don Quixote by Miguel de Cervantes with many moments of comedy, but also offers reflection on matters such as life after a dictatorship, Communism, and the Catholic faith.

== Plot summary ==
Father Quixote, a parish priest in the little town of El Toboso in Spain's La Mancha region, regards himself as a descendant of Cervantes' character of the same name, even if people point out to him that Don Quixote was a fictitious character. One day, he helps and gives food to a mysterious Italian bishop whose car has broken down. Shortly afterwards, he is given the title of Monsignor by the Pope, much to the surprise of his bishop who looks upon Father Quixote's activities rather with suspicion. He urges the priest to take a holiday, and so Quixote embarks upon a voyage through Spain with his old Seat 600 called "Rocinante" and in the company of the Communist ex-mayor of El Toboso (who, of course, is nicknamed "Sancho"). In the subsequent course of events, Quixote and his companion have all sorts of funny and moving adventures along the lines of his ancestor's on their way through post-Franco Spain. They encounter the contemporary equivalents of the windmills, are confronted with holy and not-so-holy places and with sinners of all sorts. In their dialogues about Catholicism and Communism, the two men are brought closer, start to appreciate each other better but also to question their own beliefs.

Quixote is briefly taken back to El Toboso, confronted by the bishop about his doings and suspended from service as a priest, but he escapes and sets out again with Sancho. In his last adventure, Father Quixote is struck down and wounded while attempting to save a statue of the Virgin Mary from hypocrites who are desecrating her by offering her up for money. This is the scene from the original Cervantes' novel refurbished with reversed accents: Quixote does know Who the Lady is, while the people in the procession actually don't. Quixote and Sancho are brought to a Trappist monastery where, sleepwalking and in delirium, Father Quixote rises from his bed at night, goes to the church, celebrates the old Tridentine Mass—all the time imagining he holds bread and wine in his hands—and then, in a last effort, administers communion to the Communist ex-mayor before sinking dead into his friend's arms.

== Television adaptations ==
In 1985, Greene and Christopher Neame adapted the novel into a television film starring Alec Guinness and Leo McKern, as well as featuring several other notable actors including Ian Richardson and Graham Crowden. Richardson and Crowden have also appeared in other versions of the Quixote story – Richardson in the 1972 film Man of La Mancha, and Crowden in the 2000 made-for-TV version of Don Quixote, starring John Lithgow.

== Radio adaptations ==
In 2016, Stephen Wyatt adapted the novel for BBC Radio 4's 15 Minute Drama. The ten-episode adaptation, directed by Marc Beeby, starred Bernard Cribbins as Quixote and Philip Jackson as Sancho. There is also an unabridged audio version of the book read by Cyril Cusack.
