= Patrick Edgeworth =

English writer (1942–2023)

- Born: 25 December 1942; London, England
- Died: 22 May 2023 (aged 80); Melbourne
- Occupation: Screenwriter
- Years active: 1969–2023

Patrick John Edgeworth (25 December 1942 – 22 May 2023) was an English stage and screenwriter.

== Early life ==
Edgeworth grew up in England. In 1969, he arrived in Australia to be best man at the wedding of his pianist brother Ron and Judith Durham, former lead singer of The Seekers. He remained in Australia.

== Television ==
Edgeworth began working as an actor for film and television, mostly in the police dramas made by Crawford Productions. In 1971, after submitting a script to them, he was offered a position as writer on Matlock Police, which he initially declined, as it would have meant forgoing acting. However, when he compared his recent earnings as an actor to what he was being offered as a staff writer, he opted for writing. After writing eighteen episodes in eighteen months at Crawfords he left, and with co-producer Russell Hagg, formed a production company, Homestead Films. He wrote 11 of the 13 episodes of Cash and Company and seven of the follow-up series, Tandarra. Both shows sold to TV networks world-wide. He also wrote and co-produced the film Raw Deal (1977).

== Theatre ==
Edgeworth's first stage play Boswell for the Defence (1989) was a hit for Leo McKern in London's West End and throughout Australia.

A second play Love Julie starring Millicent Martin and Anne Charleston toured England to rave reviews. This was followed by productions in the U.S. and South Africa. Retitled Girl Talk for Australia it had a hugely successful seven-month tour with Jacki Weaver.

His comedy/drama play Amorous Intrigue concerns the life and times of Restoration playwright Aphra Behn.

His musical, Georgy Girl, opened in December 2015 at Her Majesty's Theatre in Melbourne and toured to Sydney and Perth, for producers Richard East and Dennis Smith.

== Death ==
Edgeworth died on 22 May 2023 in Melbourne, Australia at the age of 80.

== Select credits ==
=== Television ===
- The Long Arm (1970) - actor
- Homicide - actor, writer
- Matlock Police - actor and writer
- Division 4 - actor
- Cash and Company (1975) - writer, producer
- Tandarra (1976) - writer, producer
- Against the Wind (1978) - actor
- Special Squad (1984) - writer
- Chances (1991) - writer
- Newlyweds (1993–94) - writer
- Ship to Shore (1993–94) - writer
- Blue Heelers - writer
- Snowy River: The McGregor Saga - writer
- State Coroner (1997) - writer
- Neighbours (1999) - writer

=== Feature films ===
- Raw Deal (1977) - writer, producer
- BMX Bandits (1983) - writer
- Cool Change (1986) - writer
- Driving Force (1989) - writer
- A Sting in the Tale (1989) - actor, writer
- Bad Blood (2017) - based on his screenplay

=== Theatre ===
- Boswell for the Defence (1989) - writer
- Love Julie - writer
- Girl Talk (2000) - writer
- Georgy Girl - the Seekers Musical (2015) - creator and writer
