= Edwin (film) =

British television film

- Genre: Drama
- Written by: John Mortimer
- Directed by: Rodney Bennett
- Starring: Alec Guinness; Renée Asherson; Paul Rogers
- Country of origin: United Kingdom
- Original language: English

Production
- Producer: John Rosenberg
- Running time: 90 minutes
- Production company: Anglia Television

Original release
- Network: Channel 4
- Release: 3 May 1984

Edwin is a 1984 British television film directed by Rodney Bennett and starring Alec Guinness, Renée Asherson and Paul Rogers.

A recently retired high court judge now living in the English countryside, spurred by the coming visit from Canada of his son Edwin, at last confronts his long-standing suspicions of his wife's infidelity.

== Cast ==
- Alec Guinness as Sir Fennimore Truscott
- Renée Asherson as Lady Margaret Truscott
- Paul Rogers as Thomas Marjoriebanks

== Bibliography ==
- Robert Tanitch. Guinness. Harrap, 1989.
