= Anything More Would Be Greedy =

- Genre: Comedy drama
- Written by: Malcolm Bradbury
- Directed by: Rodney Bennett
- Starring: Martin Wenner; Sharon Holm; Alison Sterling; Robert Bathurst; Tessa Peake-Jones; Matthew Marsh; Christopher Benjamin
- Narrated by: Simon Cadell
- Country of origin: United Kingdom
- Original language: English
- No. of series: 1
- No. of episodes: 6

Production
- Producer: John Rosenberg
- Production locations: Cambridge, Cambridgeshire, England, UK
- Running time: 51 minutes (including adverts)
- Production company: Anglia Television

Original release
- Network: ITV
- Release: 26 July – 30 August 1989

Anything More Would Be Greedy is a six-part British television comedy-drama miniseries was written and created by Malcolm Bradbury and directed by Rodney Bennett, this series was produced by Anglia Television for the ITV Network, first aired on ITV from 26 July to 30 August 1989. The drama was narrated by Simon Cadell and it stars Martin Wenner, Sharon Holm, Alison Sterling, Robert Bathurst, Tessa Peake-Jones, Matthew Marsh and Christopher Benjamin. The series begins as the story of a group of Cambridge students and their lives in the ten years following their graduation.

== Cast ==
- Simon Cadell as Narrator
- Martin Wenner as Peter Vickery
- Sharon Holm as Anna Golan / Anna Wynant
- Alison Sterling as Lynn Hart
- Robert Bathurst as Dennis Bedlam
- Tessa Peake-Jones as Jonquil Vickery / Jonquil Harmer
- Matthew Marsh as Mark Golan
- Christopher Benjamin as Eric Harmer
- Michael J. Shannon as Toby Dehring
- Maryann Turner as Mrs. Harmer
- Shaun Curry as Group Captain Maclehose
- Peter Gale as Dr. Franz Stubli
- Shaughan Seymour as Henry Major
- Geoffrey Beevers as Alan Nuttall
- Paul Shearer as Dave Hall
- James Villiers as Lord Fyson
- Peter Woodward as Felix Gould
- Stephen Fry as Julian Holmes-Coppitt
- Paul Brooke as Mr. Leadweller
- Hilary Drake as Leah Gould

== Episodes ==
1. "Enigma Variations" (26 July 1989)
2. "Trading Favours" (2 August 1989)
3. "Playing Games" (9 August 1989)
4. "Realizing Assets" (16 August 1989)
5. "Second Term" (23 August 1989)
6. "Georgian Silver" (30 August 1989)

== Filming locations ==
The television series was set in Cambridge, Cambridgeshire.
