= List of awards and nominations received by Alec Guinness =

Alec Guinness awards and nominations
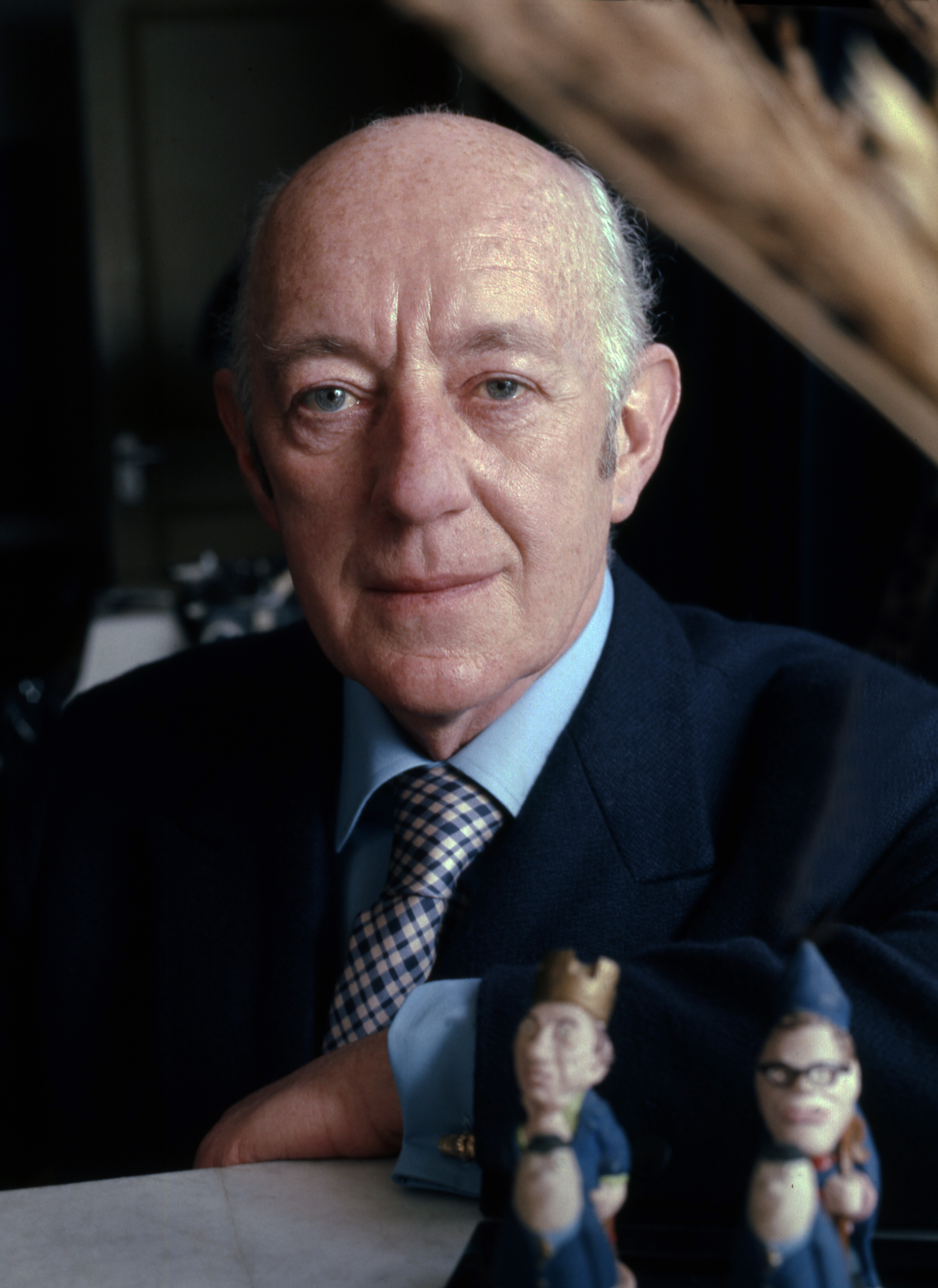
- Guinness in 1972
Awards and nominations
Award	Wins	Nominations
Academy Award	1	5
BAFTA Awards	3	7
Emmy Awards	0	2
Golden Globe Awards	1	3
Laurence Olivier Awards	0	2
Tony Awards	1	1
Grammy Awards	0	2

Totals (Note: Certain award groups do not simply award one winner. They acknowledge several different recipients, have runners-up, and have third place. Since this is a specific recognition and is different from losing an award, runner-up mentions are considered wins in this award tally. For simplification and to avoid errors, each award in this list has been presumed to have had a prior nomination.)
- Wins: 20
- Nominations: 42

Sir Alec Guinness was an English actor. Known for his leading roles on stage and screen, he received numerous accolades including an Academy Award, three BAFTA Awards, a Golden Globe Award and a Tony Award as well as nominations for two Primetime Emmy Awards, two Laurence Olivier Awards, and two Grammy Awards. Guinness has also been honored with the Academy Honorary Award in 1980, a Gala Tribute from the Film Society at Lincoln Center in 1987, the Society of London Theatre Special Award in 1988, the Honorary Golden Bear in 1988, the BAFTA Fellowship in 1989, the BFI Fellowship in 1991. He was made a Knight Commander of the Order of the British Empire by Queen Elizabeth II in 1959.

For his role as British commander Colonel Nicholson in the David Lean directed epic war film The Bridge on the River Kwai (1957) he won the Academy Award for Best Actor, the BAFTA Award for Best British Actor and the Golden Globe Award for Best Actor in a Motion Picture – Drama. He wrote and starred in the British film The Horse's Mouth (1958) he was nominated for the Academy Award for Best Adapted Screenplay and won the Venice International Film Festival's Volpi Cup for Best Actor. He was honored with a star on the Hollywood Walk of Fame in 1960.

He gained international attention for originating the role of Jedi Master Obi-Wan Kenobi in the George Lucas directed space opera Star Wars (1977) for which he was nominated for the Academy Award for Best Supporting Actor and the Golden Globe Award for Best Supporting Actor – Motion Picture. For his portrayal of William Dorrit in the screen adaptation of the Charles Dickens novel Little Dorrit (1987) he was nominated for the Academy Award for Best Supporting Actor and the Golden Globe Award for Best Supporting Actor – Motion Picture.

On television, he acted in Startime: The Wicked Scheme of Jebal Deeks (1960) earning a nomination for the Primetime Emmy Award for Outstanding Single Performance by an Actor. He portrayed George Smiley in the BBC spy drama series Tinker Tailor Soldier Spy (1979) and the BBC2 series Smiley's People (1982) for which he earned two British Academy Television Awards for Best Actor. The later of which also earned him a nomination for the Primetime Emmy Award for Outstanding Lead Actor in a Limited or Anthology Series or Movie. He played Father Quixote in the ITV British film Monsignor Quixote (1985) earning a nomination for the British Academy Television Award for Best Actor.

On stage, he portrayed the Welsh poet Dylan Thomas in the Sidney Michaels play Dylan (1964) on Broadway for which he earned the Tony Award for Best Actor in a Play. For his roles on the West End he earned two nominations for the Laurence Olivier Award for Actor of the Year in a New Play for playing Hilary in the play The Old Country (1977) and Andrey Botvinnik in the Lee Blessing play A Walk in the Woods (1988).

== Major associations ==
=== Academy Awards ===
Year	Category	Nominated work	Result	Ref.
1952	Best Actor	The Lavender Hill Mob	Nominated	
1957	Best Actor	The Bridge on the River Kwai	Won	
1958	Best Adapted Screenplay	The Horse's Mouth	Nominated	
1977	Best Supporting Actor	Star Wars	Nominated	
1979	Academy Honorary Award	—N/a	Honoured	
1988	Best Supporting Actor	Little Dorrit	Nominated	

=== BAFTA Awards ===
Year	Category	Nominated work	Result	Ref.
British Academy Film Awards
1955	Best British Actor	The Prisoner	Nominated	
1957	Best British Actor	The Bridge on the River Kwai	Won	
1959	Best British Screenplay	The Horse's Mouth	Nominated	
1960	Best British Actor	Tunes of Glory	Nominated	
1988	BAFTA Fellowship	—N/a	Honoured	
British Academy Television Awards
1980	Best Actor	Tinker Tailor Soldier Spy	Won	
1983	Best Actor	Smiley's People	Won	
1986	Best Actor	Monsignor Quixote	Nominated	

=== Emmy Awards ===
Year	Category	Nominated work	Result	Ref.
Primetime Emmy Awards
1960	Outstanding Single Performance by an Actor	Startime: The Wicked Scheme of Jebal Deeks	Nominated	
1983	Outstanding Lead Actor in a Limited Series or Special	Smiley's People	Nominated	

=== Golden Globe Awards ===
Year	Category	Nominated work	Result	Ref.
1957	Best Actor in a Motion Picture – Drama	The Bridge on the River Kwai	Won	
1977	Best Supporting Actor – Motion Picture	Star Wars	Nominated	
1988	Best Supporting Actor – Motion Picture	Little Dorrit	Nominated	

=== Laurence Olivier Awards ===
Year	Category	Nominated work	Result	Ref.
1977	Actor of the Year in a New Play	The Old Country	Nominated	
1988	Actor of the Year in a New Play	A Walk in the Woods	Nominated	
1988	Society of London Theatre Special Award	—N/a	Honoured	

=== Tony Awards ===
Year	Category	Nominated work	Result	Ref.
1964	Best Actor in a Play	Dylan	Won	

=== Grammy Awards ===
Year	Category	Nominated work	Result	Ref.
1965	Best Documentary, Spoken Word or Drama Recording (other than comedy)	Dylan	Nominated	
1966	Best Spoken Word or Drama Recording	A Personal Choice	Nominated	

== Miscellaneous awards ==
Organizations	Year	Category	Nominated work	Result	Ref.
Broadcasting Press Guild	1980	Best Actor	Tinker Tailor Soldier Spy	Won	
Drama League Award	1964	Distinguished Performance	Dylan	Won	
Evening Standard Theatre Awards	1960	Best Actor	Ross	Won	
Evening Standard British Film Awards	1978	Best Actor	Star Wars	Won	
Evening Standard British Film Awards	1994	Special Award	—N/a	Honoured	
Kansas City Film Critics Circle	1968	Best Supporting Actor	The Comedians	Won	
Laurel Awards	1958	Top Male Dramatic Performance	The Bridge on the River Kwai	Nominated	
Laurel Awards	1959	Top Male Comedy Performance	The Horse's Mouth	Nominated	
Los Angeles Film Critics Association	1988	Best Supporting Actor	Little Dorrit	Won	
Nastro d'Argento	1951	Best Foreign Actor	The Lavender Hill Mob	Won	
National Board of Review	1950	Best Actor	Kind Hearts and Coronets	Won	
National Board of Review	1958	Best Actor	The Bridge on the River Kwai	Won	
National Society of Film Critics	1988	Best Supporting Actor	Little Dorrit	Nominated	
New York Film Critics Circle	1950	Best Actor	Kind Hearts and Coronets	Nominated	
New York Film Critics Circle	1958	Best Actor	The Bridge on the River Kwai	Won	
New York Film Critics Circle	1959	Best Actor	The Horse's Mouth	Nominated	
New York Film Critics Circle	1988	Best Supporting Actor	Little Dorrit	Nominated	
Sant Jordi Awards	1956	Best Foreign Actor	The Prisoner	Won	
Sant Jordi Awards	1958	Best Foreign Actor	The Bridge on the River Kwai	Won	
Sant Jordi Awards	1959	Best Foreign Actor	The Horse's Mouth	Won	
Saturn Awards	1978	Best Supporting Actor	Star Wars	Won	
Venice International Film Festival	1958	Volpi Cup for Best Actor	The Horse's Mouth	Won	
Venice International Film Festival	1958	New Cinema Award	The Horse's Mouth	Won	
Venice International Film Festival	1960	New Cinema Award	Tunes of Glory	Won	

== Honorary awards ==
Organization	Year	Honor	Result	Ref.
Queen Elizabeth II	1959	Knight Commander of the Order of the British Empire	Honored	
Hollywood Walk of Fame	1960	Motion Picture Star	Honored	
Academy of Motion Picture Arts and Sciences	1980	Academy Honorary Award	Honored	
Film Society at Lincoln Center	1987	Chaplin Gala Tribute	Honored	
Laurence Olivier Awards	1988	Society of London Theatre Special Award	Honored	
Berlin International Film Festival	1988	Honorary Golden Bear	Honored	
British Academy of Film and Television Arts	1989	BAFTA Fellowship	Honored	
British Film Institute	1991	BFI Fellowship	Honored	
