= Abigail McKern =

English actress (b. 1955)

- Born: 15 February 1955 (age 71); Islington, London, England
- Occupation: Actress
- Years active: 1982–present
- Relatives: Leo McKern (father)

Abigail McKern (born 15 February 1955) is an English actress.

== Early life ==
Born in Islington, London, Abigail is the daughter of Leo McKern and Australian actress Jane Holland (A Son Is Born, 1946), and also has a sister, Harriet.

== Career ==
She appeared alongside her father Leo McKern, in the last three series of Rumpole of the Bailey as Rumpole's young pupil Liz Probert. She has also played many other stage and television roles. In 1983, she won the Laurence Olivier Award for Best Actress in a Supporting Role for her portrayal of Celia in As You Like It.
