= Her Majesty's Theatre, Melbourne =

Theatre in Melbourne, Victoria, Australia

Her Majesty's Theatre
- Alexandra Theatre (1886–1900); His Majesty's Theatre (1924–1953)
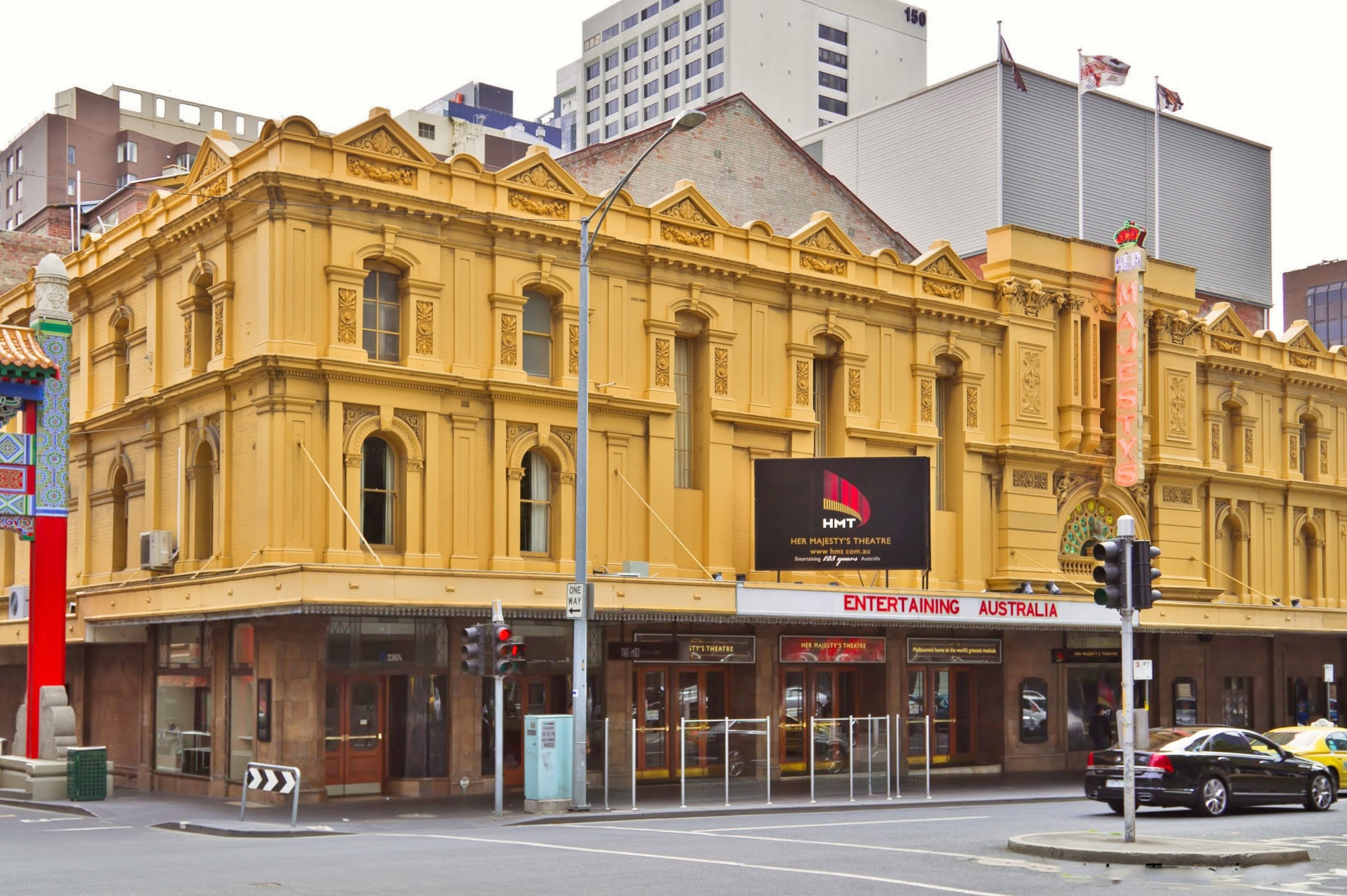
- Her Majesty's Theatre, 2012
- Interactive map of Her Majesty's Theatre
- Address: 219 Exhibition Street; Melbourne; Australia
- Coordinates: 37.8109452°S 144.9696207°E
- Owner: Mike Walsh
- Capacity: 1,700
- Designation: Victorian Heritage Register
- Current use: Musicals, opera

Construction
- Opened: 1 October 1886 as Alexandra Theatre
- Architect: Nahum Barnet

Website
- www.hmt.com.au

Victorian Heritage Register
- Official name: Her Majesty's Theatre
- Type: State Registered Place
- Designated: August 6, 1986
- Reference no.: H0641
- Heritage Overlay number: HO631

Her Majesty's Theatre is a 1,700-seat theatre in Melbourne's East End Theatre District, Australia. Built in 1886, it is located at 219 Exhibition Street, Melbourne. It is classified by the National Trust of Australia and is listed on the Victorian Heritage Register.

Purchased in 2000 by Mike Walsh, the theatre was restored and refitted to accommodate larger productions.

== History ==
The first recorded use of the area near the corner of Stephen (now known as Exhibition) Street and Little Bourke Street as a venue for entertainment was in 1880 when tiered seating was constructed and an open-air venue for circuses and equestrian shows established.

The Hippodrome lasted four years before the French-born entrepreneur, Jules François de Sales Joubert, secured a 30-year lease on the site and commissioned architect Nahum Barnet to design a theatre, business, and accommodation complex.

In 1886, work on Joubert's project was completed. On 1 October, the Alexandra Theatre opened. Named after the then Princess of Wales, wife of the future King Edward VII, the theatre was the largest in the Southern Hemisphere, boasting a capacity of 2,800. The very first show staged was the comedy, Bad Lads. Also in the first year, the Australian classic, For the Term of His Natural Life, was performed, as was Saturday afternoon wrestling and a season of Italian opera.

The early days of the "Alec" (as it became known) were problematic. Joubert had spent almost twice his original budget on construction and was unable to obtain the required operating licences for the hotel, bars and cafes of the complex. By November 1887, he was insolvent.

Early in 1888, the renowned actor and playwright, Alfred Dampier, leased the theatre and introduced a successful programming and pricing formula. The "Alec" prospered.

In 1900, well-known expatriate American theatrical producer, James Cassius Williamson, took over the lease of the theatre and engaged architect William Pitt to supervise renovations. The stage was lowered by 60 cm. and the stalls and orchestra pit were raised by almost 30 cm. The Dress Circle was remodeled and new boxes were added. Seats were re-upholstered, re-painting was carried out and a new stage curtain and lighting were installed. The theatre, re-vamped and re-christened Her Majesty's Theatre in honour of Queen Victoria, re-opened with a production of Gilbert & Sullivan's HMS Pinafore on 19 May.

In 1909, after a private sound test, Dame Nellie Melba, by then an international star, declared that the theatre’s acoustics were "dead" and that she would not perform unless they were altered. Further renovations to the theatre's interior were carried out in time for Dame Nellie to hold her Australian opera debut in November 1911.

On 6 July 1913, Williamson – the biggest theatrical entrepreneur in the world at the time – died at the age of 68. As a mark of respect, all the Williamson theatres "were dark" for one night, a rare tribute. However, the company he had established with Her Majesty's Theatre as its flagship continued to prosper, featuring the operettas of Gilbert and Sullivan as staple farewell into the 1920s.

In 1929 the interior of the theatre was gutted by fire. It was not until 1934 that the interior was rebuilt in an Art Deco style 1934 designed by architects C N Hollinshead and Albion Walkley, leading Australian theatre specialists, with Hugh Vivian Taylor as a sound consultant to the design. Technological advances were incorporated such as heating, cooling and humidity control as well as cyclorama lighting effects managed from a central control board. Within three years of the re-opening the theatre had successfully staged musical comedy, grand opera, Gilbert & Sullivan opera and ballet. In the postwar period, it was the Melbourne home of the Borovansky Ballet Company for 17 years, and was also used for the Elizabethan Trust Opera Company (now the Australian Opera).

The name change from the Alexandra to Her Majesty's Theatre occurred eight months before the death of Queen Victoria in 1900. The theatre management maintained the name despite there now being a King on the throne. In 1924, the theatre was renamed again as His Majesty's Theatre, this time in honour of King George V. It reverted to Her Majesty's in May 1953, in time for the coronation of Queen Elizabeth II. As of July 2023, it remained as Her Majesty's despite the accession of King Charles III in September 2022.

Despite the changes in identity, the theatre consistently played host to the world's best artists and shows. The legendary Russian ballerina, Anna Pavlova, captivated Australian crowds at performances in 1926 and 1929.

== Previous productions ==
Previous notable productions at Her Majesty's include:

- 1953: Call Me Madam
- 1954: Paint Your Wagon
- 1955: Can-Can
- 1956: The Boy Friend
- 1957: The Pajama Game
- 1958: Damn Yankees
- 1959: My Fair Lady (Original Australian Production 1959)
- 1961: Oliver!
- 1962: Carnival
- 1963: Sail Away, How to Succeed in Business Without Really Trying
- 1964: Camelot, A Funny Thing Happened on the Way to the Forum
- 1965: Hello, Dolly!
- 1966: Funny Girl
- 1967: Sweet Charity, Fiddler on the Roof
- 1968: Mame
- 1969: I Do! I Do!, Fiddler on the Roof
- 1970: My Fair Lady, Promises, Promises, Man of La Mancha
- 1971: 1776, Charlie Girl
- 1972: No, No, Nanette
- 1973 Two Gentleman of Verona, Lloyd George Knew My Father, Godspell
- 1974: Pippin, A Little Night Music, Irene
- 1975: At Least You Can Say You've Seen It! (Barry Humphries), Gypsy
- 1976: The Wiz, Man of La Mancha, More Canterbury Tales
- 1977: The Twenties and All That Jazz, Harvey
- 1978: A Chorus Line, Isn't It Pathetic At His Age (Barry Humphries), Annie
- 1979: Sacred Cow (Reg Livermore), Hamlet (Old Vic Company)
- 1980: They're Playing Our Song, Up in One (Peter Allen), Son of Betty (Reg Livermore), 13 Rue de L'amour, Evita
- 1984: The Odd Couple
- 1986: Are You Lonesome Tonight?
- 1987: Sugar Babies, Cats
- 1989: Big River
- 1991: Buddy - The Buddy Holly Story
- 1993: Hot Shoe Shuffle, 42nd Street, Joseph and the Amazing Technicolor Dreamcoat
- 1994: A Chorus Line, The Pirates of Penzance
- 1995: The Mikado
- 1996: Smokey Joe's Cafe
- 1997: Sweet Charity
- 1998: An Ideal Husband, Chicago
- 2002: The Hollow Crown
- 2003: Cabaret, Hair, Nutcracker on Ice
- 2004: Eureka
- 2005: Mamma Mia!, Die Fledermaus (Melbourne Opera)
- 2006: An Inspector Calls, Così fan tutte (Victorian Opera),
- 2007: Madame Butterfly (Melbourne Opera), Miss Saigon, The Love of the Nightingale (Victorian Opera), Orphée et Eurydice (Victorian Opera), Monty Python's Spamalot
- 2008: Fiddler on the Roof, Billy Elliot the Musical
- 2009: Chicago
- 2010: Mamma Mia!, Mary Poppins
- 2011: Doctor Zhivago, QI Live
- 2012: A Chorus Line, Barry Humphries Farewell tour - Eat Pray Laugh!, A Funny Thing Happened on the way to The Forum
- 2013: Chitty Chitty Bang Bang, Hot Shoe Shuffle, The Graduate
- 2014: Grease, Bernadette Peters in Concert, Les Misérables
- 2015: Strictly Ballroom
- 2016: Georgy Girl - The Seekers Musical, Lucia di Lammermoor (Victorian Opera), Avenue Q, Singin' in the Rain, Kinky Boots
- 2017: Aladdin
- 2018: Beautiful: The Carole King Musical, The Rocky Horror Show, School of Rock
- 2019: Muriel's Wedding the Musical, Sweeney Todd, Charlie and the Chocolate Factory
- 2020: Shrek The Musical
- 2021: Frozen
- 2022: Hamilton
- 2023: Mary Poppins, 2:22 A Ghost Story, Death of a Salesman, Miss Saigon
- 2024: Grease, Chicago, Beauty and the Beast
- 2025: Hadestown, MJ the Musical
- 2026: Waitress
