= Georgy Girl (musical) =

- The Seekers Musical
- Music: The Seekers
- Lyrics: The Seekers
- Book: Patrick Edgeworth
- Premiere: 15 December 2015: Her Majesty's Theatre, Melbourne
- Productions: 2015 Melbourne; 2016 Sydney; 2025 New Zealand

Georgy Girl – The Seekers Musical is a biographical jukebox musical about the Australian 1960s pop quartet The Seekers, written by Patrick Edgeworth. It incorporates songs associated with The Seekers, such as "Morningtown Ride", "I'll Never Find Another You", "The Carnival is Over", "A World of Our Own" and "Georgy Girl". It also includes several pop songs by other artists, including Tom Jones's "It's Not Unusual" and Bessie Smith's "Mama's Got the Blues".

Writer Patrick Edgeworth had a personal connection to the material, in that his brother, Ron Edgeworth, was married to Judith Durham, who was The Seekers' lead singer from 1963 to 1968.

Georgy Girl began previews at Her Majesty's Theatre in Melbourne on 15 December 2015, and had its official premiere on 22 December. The production also played at the State Theatre in Sydney from April 2016.

The New Zealand Premiere was held at the Off Broadway Theatre in Papakura 7-21 June 2025.
