= Boswell for the Defence =

1989 Australian play by Patrick Edgeworth

Boswell for the Defence is a 1989 Australian play by Patrick Edgeworth about James Boswell and his defence of Mary Bryant. The title role was originally played by Leo McKern.

Edgeworth had been hired to write a mini series about the First Fleet. The show was never made but during the course of research Edgeworth discovered the story of Boswell and Bryant and decided to turn it into a play.

There have been a number of attempts to turn the play into a film, notably by Bruce Beresford and Gregor Jordan with Steve Coogan.
