= Alec Guinness: A Class Act =

Irish documentary

- Directed by: Brian O'Flaherty
- Produced by: Brian O'Flaherty
- Starring: Simon Callow; Sinéad Cusack; Tom Courtenay; Sally Guinness; Jeremy Irons
- Cinematography: Anthony Brown, Kevin Cantrell
- Edited by: Tony O'Flaherty
- Music by: Hugh Drumm
- Distributed by: Sky Studios
- Release date: 1 November 2024
- Running time: 90 minutes
- Country: Ireland
- Language: English

Alec Guinness: A Class Act is a 2024 documentary film about the English actor Alec Guinness. The documentary tells the story of Guinness's career in the entertainment industry, beginning with his work on British stage, including his 1934 performance at the Playhouse Theatre in the West End. It covers his move from Shakespearean theatre to the cinema, for which he won numerous accolades, including the Best Actor Oscar and BAFTA for The Bridge on the River Kwai (1957), and how he later gained widespread fame with a new generation for his portrayal of Obi-Wan Kenobi in Star Wars (1977).

The story is told by family, friends and peers, and also using Guinness's own words from interviews and voice recordings.

The film was recorded at Sands Films studios in Rotherhithe, London.

== Cast ==
- Simon Callow
- Tom Courtenay
- Sinéad Cusack
- Vernon Dobtcheff
- Christine Edzard
- Stephen Frears
- Julian Glover
- Richard Goodwin
- Alec Guinness (archive footage)
- Sally Guinness
- Jeremy Irons
- John Irvin
- Michael Jayston
- Miriam Margolyes
- Joanna McCallum
- Piers Paul Reid
- Madeline Smith
- David Wilkinson

== Reception ==
The Guardian called the documentary "a densely-packed biography". TV Everyday described the documentary as "engaging", "a heartfelt exploration of his legacy", and "a must-watch for fans of cinema and anyone interested in the stories of those who shaped the acting world". Radio Times called it "a rewarding dive into one of the great acting careers, with a string of warm contributors and good anecdotes." The Times called it "splendid".
