= Leo McKern =

Australian actor (1920–2002)

Leo McKern AO
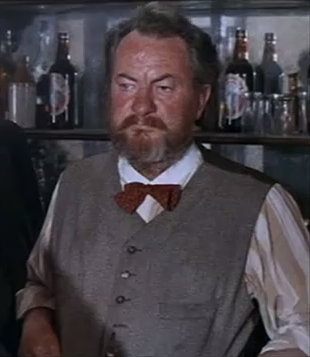
- McKern in Ryan's Daughter (1970)
- Born: Reginald McKern; 16 March 1920; Sydney, New South Wales, Australia
- Died: 23 July 2002 (aged 82); Bath, Somerset, England
- Education: Sydney Technical High School
- Occupation: Actor
- Years active: 1944–1999
- Known for: A Man for All Seasons (play and film); Travelling North (film)
- Television: The Prisoner; Rumpole of the Bailey
- Height: 5 ft 7 in (170 cm)
- Spouse: Jane Holland (m. 1946)
- Children: 2, including Abigail McKern
- Awards: Australian Film Institute Award for Best Actor in a Leading Role (1987)

Reginald "Leo" McKern (16 March 1920 – 23 July 2002) was an Australian actor who appeared in numerous British, Australian and American television programmes and films, and in more than 200 stage roles. His notable roles include Clang in Help! (1965), Thomas Cromwell in A Man for All Seasons (1966), Tom Ryan in Ryan's Daughter (1970), Harry Bundage in Candleshoe (1977), Paddy Button in The Blue Lagoon (1980), Dr. Grogan in The French Lieutenant's Woman (1981), Father Imperius in Ladyhawke (1985), and the role that made him a household name as an actor, Horace Rumpole, whom he played in the British television series Rumpole of the Bailey. He also portrayed Carl Bugenhagen in the first and second installments of The Omen series and Number Two in the TV series The Prisoner.

== Early life ==
Reginald McKern was born 16 March 1920 in Sydney, New South Wales, the son of Vera (née Martin) and Norman Walton McKern. Known as "Leo" from a young age, he attended Sydney Technical High School. On leaving school, he initially worked in a factory, where at the age of 15, he suffered an accident which resulted in the removal of his left eye. He first worked as an engineering apprentice, then as an artist, followed by service as a sapper with the Australian Army's Royal Australian Engineers during World War II. In 1944, in Sydney, he performed in his first stage role.

== Career ==
=== Theatre ===
McKern fell in love with Australian actress Jane Holland, moved to the United Kingdom to be with her, and married her in 1946. Despite the difficulties posed by his glass eye and Australian accent, he soon became a regular performer at London's Old Vic theatre and the Shakespeare Memorial Theatre (now the Royal Shakespeare Theatre) in Stratford-upon-Avon.

McKern's most notable Shakespearean role was as Iago in Othello, in 1952. In 1955 he appeared in The Burnt Flower Bed by Ugo Betti directed by Peter Hall at the Arts Theatre Club in London. He played Big Daddy in Peter Hall's production of Cat on a Hot Tin Roof at the Comedy Theatre in 1958, and went on to play the German ambassador in another Peter Hall production, Brouhaha starring Peter Sellers at the Aldwych Theatre. He also starred opposite him in the film The Mouse That Roared, though like with most of the other actors, he did not reprise his role in the sequel The Mouse on the Moon. He originated the role of Common Man in Robert Bolt's A Man for All Seasons in the West End in 1960, but for the show's Broadway production appeared as Thomas Cromwell, 1st Earl of Essex, a role he would reprise for the 1966 film version. He also portrayed Subtle in Ben Jonson's The Alchemist in 1962. In 1965, he played the lead in Bolt's The Thwarting of Baron Bolligrew, and Disson in Harold Pinter's Tea Party.

He appeared at the Royal Exchange, Manchester in Uncle Vanya in 1977 and in Crime and Punishment in 1978.

In 1989-90, he played James Boswell in the one-man show, Boswell for the Defence in theatres in Melbourne, Sydney, Hong Kong and London.

=== Film ===
McKern's film debut was in Murder in the Cathedral (1952). His more notable film appearances included the science-fiction classics X the Unknown (1956), The Day the Earth Caught Fire (1961), the World War I drama King and Country (1964), Help! (1965), the Academy Award-winning adaptation of A Man for All Seasons (1966), The Shoes of the Fisherman (1968), Ryan's Daughter (1970), Massacre in Rome (1973), The Adventure of Sherlock Holmes' Smarter Brother (1975), The Omen (1976), The Blue Lagoon (1980),The French Lieutenant's Woman (1981) and Ladyhawke (1985). He was presented with the Australian Film Institute Award for Best Actor in a Leading Role for Travelling North (1987). He co-starred as Sancho Zancas opposite Alec Guinness as Father Quixote, in Monsignor Quixote (1985).

=== Television ===
Two of McKern's earliest television roles were Sir Roger DeLisle (usurper of the Locksley manor and lands) and Herbert of Doncaster (a corrupt moneylender) in the 1950s black-and-white series The Adventures of Robin Hood.

During the 1960s, he was one of several Number Twos in the TV series The Prisoner. Along with Colin Gordon, McKern was one of only two actors to play Number Two more than once. He first played the character in the episodes "The Chimes of Big Ben" and "Once Upon a Time", and reprised the role in the final episode, "Fall Out". The filming of "Once Upon a Time" was a particularly intense experience for McKern; according to one biographer, the stress caused him to suffer either a nervous breakdown or a heart attack (accounts differ), forcing production to stop for a time.

In 1976, McKern narrated and presented The Battle of the Somme, a BBC documentary marking the 60th anniversary of the World War I battle. He played the Earl of Gloucester in Granada Television's production of King Lear (1983). Also in 1983, he starred in episodes of the mini-series Reilly, Ace of Spies as Zaharov, director of Vickers.

==== Rumpole of the Bailey ====
In 1975, McKern made his first appearance in the role that would make him a household name as an actor, Horace Rumpole, whom he played in Rumpole of the Bailey, originally an episode of the BBC's Play for Today. A series of the same name, comprising 44 episodes, was produced for ITV between 1978 and 1992. According to Rumpole's creator, author John Mortimer, McKern "not only played the character Rumpole—he added to it, brightened it and brought it fully to life."

Although he enjoyed the role, McKern expressed doubts about its popularity and the extent to which his life was becoming intertwined with Rumpole's. "McKern was often unhappy, decrying his television fame as an 'insatiable monster'. He stressed that his Peer Gynt was a greater performance and lamented: 'If I get an obit in any paper, they will say, "... of course, known to millions as Rumpole."'" In the later series, his daughter Abigail McKern joined the cast as Liz Probert.

=== Commercial work ===
Starting in 1985, McKern appeared in a series of advertisements for Lloyds Bank, playing the upholder of quality standards. In 1987, investment firm Smith Barney selected McKern to succeed John Houseman as its spokesman. The move was part of a broader shift in their TV commercials, including hiring Dinah Sheridan to play McKern's wife. In 1989, Smith Barney again changed spokesmen, dropping McKern for American actor George C. Scott.

=== Radio ===
McKern wrote one radio play, London Story, which became the film Chain of Events (1958). He also provided the voice of Captain Haddock in the 1992 and 1993 BBC Radio adaptation of Hergé's The Adventures of Tintin.

== Personal life and death ==
In 1983, McKern was appointed an Officer of the Order of Australia for his services to the performing arts.

He frequently travelled between England and Australia, both to visit family and friends and to appear in various films and plays. As he was frightened of flying, he booked tickets to travel on cargo ships. This gave him time and peace to read scripts and contracts, with the added benefit of feeling he was on holiday.

Worried that his stout frame would not appeal to audiences, McKern suffered from stage fright, which became harder to control with age.

In 1997 he appeared in a party political broadcast for the United Kingdom Independence Party.

McKern and his wife, fellow Australian actor Jane Holland (A Son Is Born, 1946), had two daughters, Abigail and Harriet.

Suffering in his final years from ill health, McKern moved into a nursing home near Bath in Somerset in 2002, where he died a few weeks later, on 23 July, at the age of 82; his body was cremated at Haycombe Cemetery in Bath.

== Filmography ==
Year	Title	Role	Notes
1951	Murder in the Cathedral	Third Knight	
1955	All for Mary	Gaston Nikopopoulos	
1956	X the Unknown	Police Inspector McGill	
1957	Time Without Pity	Robert Stanford	
1957	Confess, Killer	Lt. Kolski	
1958	A Tale of Two Cities	Attorney General	
1959	Web of Evidence	McEvoy	
1959	Yesterday's Enemy	Max	
1959	The Mouse That Roared	Benter, Leader of the Opposition	
1959	The Running Jumping & Standing Still Film		Short, uncredited
1960	Scent of Mystery	Tommy Kennedy	
1960	Jazz Boat	Inspector	
1961	Mr. Topaze	Muche	
1961	The Day the Earth Caught Fire	Bill Maguire	
1962	The Inspector	Brandt	
1963	Doctor in Distress	Harry Heilbronn	
1964	Children of the Damned	Inspector	Uncredited
1964	Hot Enough for June	Simoneva	
1964	A Jolly Bad Fellow	Professor Kerris Bowles-Ottery	
1964	King and Country	Captain O'Sullivan	
1965	The Amorous Adventures of Moll Flanders	Squint	
1965	Help!	High Priest Clang	
1966	A Man for All Seasons	Thomas Cromwell	
1968	Assignment K	Smith	
1968	Nobody Runs Forever	Flannery	Uncredited
1968	Decline and Fall... of a Birdwatcher	Captain Grimes	
1968	The Shoes of the Fisherman	Cardinal Leone	
1970	Ryan's Daughter	Thomas Ryan	
1973	Massacre in Rome	General Kurt Mälzer	
1975	The Adventure of Sherlock Holmes' Smarter Brother	Professor Moriarty	
1976	The Omen	Carl Bugenhagen	Uncredited
1976	The Battle of the Somme	Narrator	
1977	Candleshoe	Harry Bundage	
1978	Damien - Omen II	Carl Bugenhagen	Uncredited
1980	The Blue Lagoon	Paddy Button	
1981	The French Lieutenant's Woman	Dr. Grogan	
1984	The Chain	Thomas	
1985	Ladyhawke	Imperius	
1987	Travelling North	Frank	
1995	Dad and Dave: On Our Selection	Dad (Joseph) Rudd	
1999	Molokai: The Story of Father Damien	Bishop Maigret	

== Television ==
Year	Title	Role	Notes
1955	The Adventures of Robin Hood	Herbert of Doncaster/Sir Roger de Lisle	2 episodes
1956-58	BBC Sunday Night Theatre	Kostlyov/Zdarov	2 episodes
1957-61	ITV Play of the Week	Various	3 episodes
1959-67	Armchair Theatre	Various	4 episodes
1960	Saturday Playhouse	Sheridan Whiteside	Episode: "The Man Who Came to Dinner"
1962	Drama 61-67	Billy Driscoll	Episode: "Drama '62: No Decision"
1963	The Magical World of Disney	Roublot	2 episodes
1965	Love Story	Theo Sandman	Episode: "A Cure for Tin Ear"
1966	Thirty-Minute Theatre	Mark	Episode: "Case Suspended"
1966	Alice in Wonderland	Duchess	TV movie
1967-68	The Prisoner	Number Two	Episodes: "The Chimes of Big Ben", "Once Upon a Time" and "Fall Out"
1968	The Wednesday Play	Robert Kelvin	Episode: "On the Eve of Publication"
1973	ITV Saturday Night Theatre	Leo	Episode: "Afternoon at the Festival"
1973	BBC Play of the Month	Azdak	Episode: "Caucasian Chalk Circle"
1975	Churchill's People	King Penda	Episode: "The Coming of the Cross"
1975	Shades of Greene	Henry	Episode: "Cheap in August"
1975-81	Play for Today	Horace Rumpole/Sir Frederic Charlton	2 episodes
1976	Space: 1999	Companion Gwent	Episode: "The Infernal Machine"
1976	Our Mutual Friend	Mr. Boffin	6 episodes
1978–1992	Rumpole of the Bailey	Horace Rumpole	
1978	Omnibus	Paul Gaughin	Episode: "Paul Gaughin: The Savage and the Construction of Paradise"
1978	The Nativity	Herod the Great	TV movie
1982	ITV Playhouse	Edwin Coote	Episode: "The Boxwallah"
1983	Reilly, Ace of Spies	Basil Zaharoff	4 episodes
1983	King Lear	Earl of Gloucester	TV movie
1985	Murder with Mirrors	Inspector Curry	TV movie
1985	Monsignor Quixote	Sancho Zancas	TV movie
1992	Screen Two	Sir Arthur Quiller-Couch	Episode: "The Last Romantic"
1993	Screen One	Cyril	Episode: A Foreign Field

== Theatre ==
Year	Title	Role	Notes
1948–49	The Miser	Old Master Simon	New Theatre (London)
1948–49	She Stoops to Conquer	Little Aminadab; T/O Tony Lumpkin	New Theatre (London)
1949–50	Hamlet	Guildenstern	New Theatre (London)
1949–50	The Miser		The Old Vic
1949–50	A Month in the Country	Matvey	New Theatre
1949–50	Love's Labour's Lost	A Forester; T/O Dull	New Theatre
1950-51	Bartholomew Fair		The Old Vic
1950-51	The Wedding		The Old Vic
1950-51	Electra		The Old Vic
1950-51	Henry V	Nym/Sir Thomas Erpingham	The Old Vic
1950-51	The Merry Wives of Windsor		The Old Vic
1950-51	Twelfth Night	Feste	The Old Vic
1951	The Clandestine Marriage	Brush	The Old Vic
1951-52	Timon of Athens		The Old Vic
1951-52	Tamburlaine		The Old Vic
1951-52	King Lear	Fool	
1952 (press night)	Othello	Iago	Shakespeare Memorial Theatre
1952 (press night)	As You Like It	Touchstone	Shakespeare Memorial Theatre
1953 (press night)	Othello	Iago	Tour - Royal Shakespeare Company
1953 (press night)	As You Like It	Touchstone	Tour - Royal Shakespeare Company
1953 (press night)	Henry IV, Part 1	Northumberland / Owen Glendower	Tour - Royal Shakespeare Company
1954 (press night)	A Midsummer Night's Dream	Peter Quince	Tour - Royal Shakespeare Company
1954 (press night)	Romeo and Juliet	Friar Laurence	Tour - Royal Shakespeare Company
1954 (press night)	The Taming of the Shrew	Grumio	Tour - Royal Shakespeare Company
1954 (press night)	Troilus and Cressida	Ulysses	Tour - Royal Shakespeare Company
1954 (press night)	Toad of Toad Hall	Mr. Toad	Princes Theatre
1955	The Lark	The Promoter	Lyric Theatre, Opera House, Manchester, and other locations
1955	The Burnt Flower Bed	Thomas	Arts Theatre
1955-6	The Queen and the Rebels	Amos	Theatre Royal Haymarket
1958	Cat on a Hot Tin Roof	Amos	Comedy Theatre
1958-9	Brouhaha		Aldwych Theatre
1959-60	Rollo	Léon Rollo	Strand Theatre, London, Duchess Theatre, and other locations
1960-61	A Man for All Seasons	The Common Man	Globe Theatre, London, New Theatre, Oxford, and other locations
1961	Queen After Death	King Ferrante	Oxford Playhouse
1962	The Alchemist	Subtle	The Old Vic
1962-3	Othello		The Old Vic
1962-3	Peer Gynt	Peer Gynt/The Boyg	The Old Vic
1963-4	Coriolanus	Menenius Agrippa	Nottingham Playhouse
1965 (press night)	The Thwarting of Baron Bolligrew	Baron Bolligrew	Aldwych Theatre
1966-7	Volpone	Volpone	Oxford Playhouse and Garrick Theatre,
1973-4	The Wolf	Keleman	Oxford Playhouse, Apollo Theatre and other locations
1980	Rollo	Léon Rollo	Royal Exchange Theatre
1982	The Housekeeper	Matt Quinlan	Apollo Theatre, London, Theatre Royal, Brighton, and other locations
1984	Number One	Léon Saint-Pé	Theatre Royal, Windsor and Queen’s Theatre, London
1989	Boswell for the Defence	James Boswell	Playhouse Theatre
1995-6	Hobson's Choice	Henry Horatio Hobson	Chichester Festival Theatre, Lyric Theatre and other locations
1995-6	Hobson's Choice	Henry Horatio Hobson	Theatre Royal, Bath
1996	When We Are Married	Henry Ormonroyd	Savoy Theatre and Chichester Festival Theatre
