= Monsignor Quixote (film) =

1987 television film

Monsignor Quixote is a 1985 British television gentle satirical comedy film made by Thames Television for ITV. Adapted from Graham Greene's novel of the same name — in a much shorter pastiche of Miguel de Cervantes's 17th-century tome Don Quixote — its teleplay is credited to Greene and Christopher Neame, with Rodney Bennett as the director.

The film stars Alec Guinness as the titular priest and Leo McKern as his "Sancho", the communist one-time mayor of their town of El Toboso in La Mancha — a chalk and cheese odd couple — undertaking a touring holiday across post-Franco Spain in the priest's decrepit little Seat 600 called "Rocinante". The fractious pair are brought closer in their dialogues about Catholicism and Communism and learn to appreciate each other better, but also question their own beliefs. The film features several notable actors including Rosalie Crutchley, Ian Richardson, Graham Crowden, Maurice Denham, and an early role by Anton Lesser.

The film was broadcast in Germany on Christmas Eve in 1986; PBS broadcast the film in the United States in 13 February 1987 in its anthology series Great Performances; and it was broadcast in Italy on 3 April 1988.

== Production ==
The film was produced by Johnny Goodman with Lloyd Shirley and Graham Greene for Thames. It was directed by Rodney Bennett, with cinematography by Norman G. Langley, and original music by the Spanish composer Antón García Abril.

The film is notable for being filmed in the actual locations Greene wrote about in his novel. Filmed in Spain ten years after Francisco Franco's death, it included filming at the controversial mausoleum site Valley of the Fallen.

== Cast ==
- Alec Guinness as Father Quixote
- Leo McKern as Sancho Zancas
- Ian Richardson as the Bishop of Motopo
- Graham Crowden as the bishop
- Maurice Denham as Senor Diego
- Philip Stone as Father Leopoldo
- Rosalie Crutchley as Quixote’s housekeeper, Teresa
- Valentine Pelka as Father Herrera
- Don Fellows as Professor Pilbeam
- Michael Poole as Dr Galván
- Gareth Kirkland as Paco
- Clive Merrison as the Shop Assistant
- Roland Oliver as the Stout Guardia
- Carl Forgione as the Second Guardia
- Colin Haigh as the Guardia by River
- Peter Gale as the Undertaker
- Anton Lesser as the Robber
- Chris Sanders as the Mexican Businessman

== Reception ==
The film was received well and was short-listed for the 1986 BAFTA award for Best Single Television Drama, with Alec Guinness receiving a BAFTA nomination for the Best Actor for his portrayal of the eponymous role as well.
