= Alec Guinness =

English actor (1914–2000)

Sir Alec Guinness CH CBE
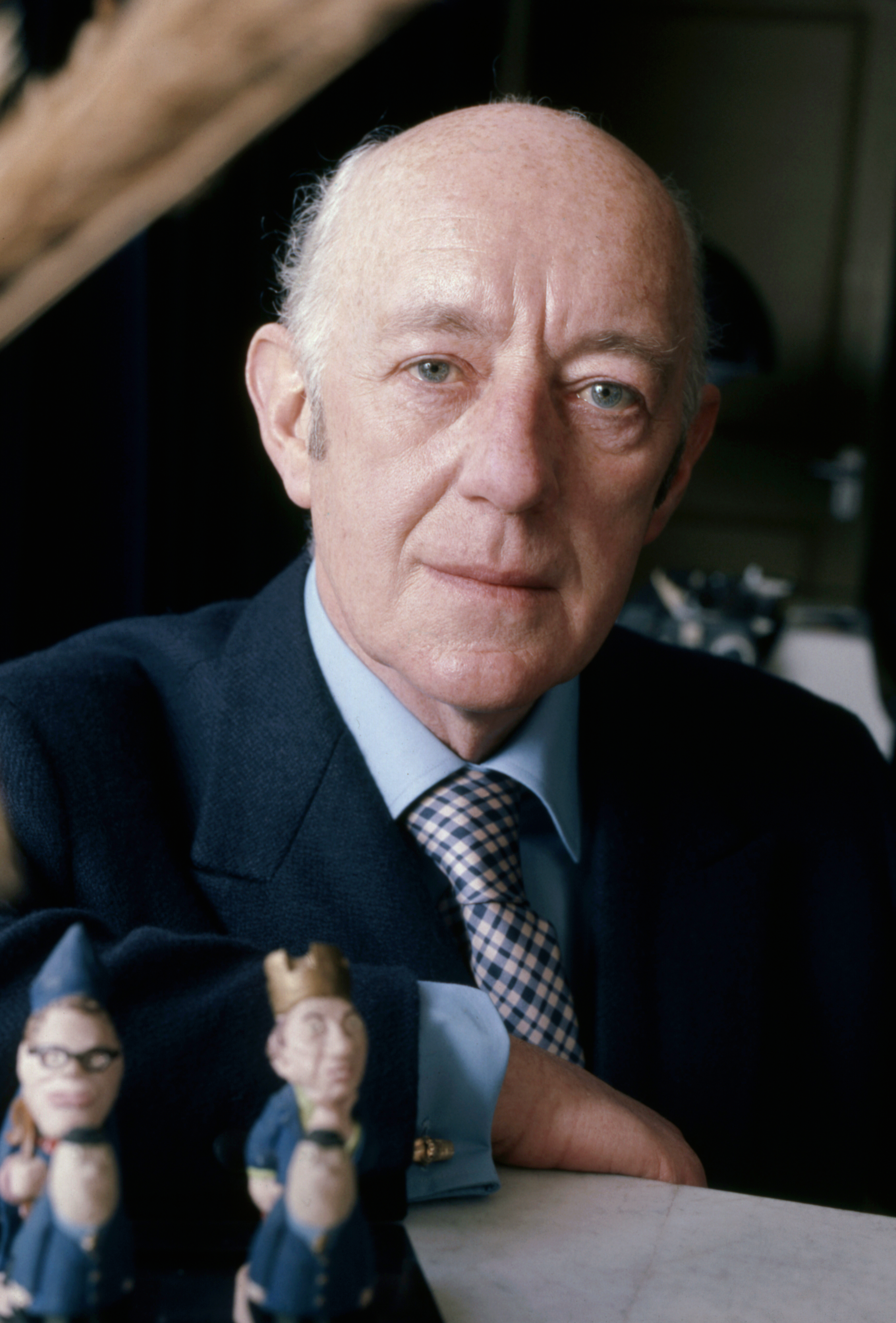
- Portrait by Allan Warren, 1973
- Born: Alec Guinness de Cuffe; 2 April 1914; Maida Vale, London, England
- Died: 5 August 2000 (aged 86); Midhurst, West Sussex, England
- Occupation: Actor
- Years active: 1934–1996
- Works: Full list
- Spouse: Merula Salaman (m. 1938)
- Children: Matthew Guinness
- Relatives: Nesta Guinness-Walker (great-grandson)
- Awards: Full list

Sir Alec Guinness (born Alec Guinness de Cuffe; 2 April 1914 – 5 August 2000) was an English actor. He is widely acclaimed as one of the most important stage and film actors of the 20th Century. In the BFI listing of the 100 most important British films of the 20th century, he was the single most noted actor. Guiness appeared in nine films across the list, six in starring roles and three in supporting roles, including five films directed by David Lean and four from Ealing Studios. His accolades include an Academy Award, a BAFTA, a Golden Globe, a Tony Award and a Volpi Cup. In 1959, he was knighted by Queen Elizabeth II for services to the arts. He received a star on the Hollywood Walk of Fame in 1960, the Academy Honorary Award for lifetime achievement in 1980 and the BAFTA Academy Fellowship Award in 1989.

Guinness began his stage career in 1934. Two years later, at the age of 22, he played the role of Osric in Hamlet in the West End and joined the Old Vic. He continued to play Shakespearean roles throughout his career. He served in the Royal Naval Reserve during the Second World War and commanded a landing craft during the invasion of Sicily and Elba. Along with Laurence Olivier, John Gielgud and Ralph Richardson, he was one of the great British theatre actors who made the transition to films after the war, making his name in six Ealing comedies, starting in 1949 with both A Run for Your Money and Kind Hearts and Coronets (in which he played eight different characters). He went on to lead roles in 1951 with The Man in the White Suit and The Lavender Hill Mob (for which he received his first Academy Award nomination for Best Actor), then in 1955 with The Ladykillers, and culminating in 1957 with Barnacle Bill.

Guinness collaborated six times with director David Lean: as Herbert Pocket in Great Expectations (1946); Fagin in Oliver Twist (1948); Col. Nicholson in The Bridge on the River Kwai (1957), for which he won both the Academy Award and the BAFTA Award for Best Actor; Prince Faisal in Lawrence of Arabia (1962); General Yevgraf Zhivago in Doctor Zhivago (1965); and Professor Godbole in A Passage to India (1984). In 1970, Guinness played Jacob Marley's ghost in Ronald Neame's Scrooge. He also portrayed Obi-Wan Kenobi in George Lucas's original Star Wars trilogy, which brought him further recognition. For his performance in the original 1977 film, Guinness was nominated as Best Supporting Actor for the Academy Award and Golden Globe. Guinness's later life was also associated with his definitive depiction of the leading role of George Smiley in the BBC television series Tinker, Tailor, Soldier, Spy and Smiley's People by John le Carré.

== Life and career ==
=== Early years and education ===
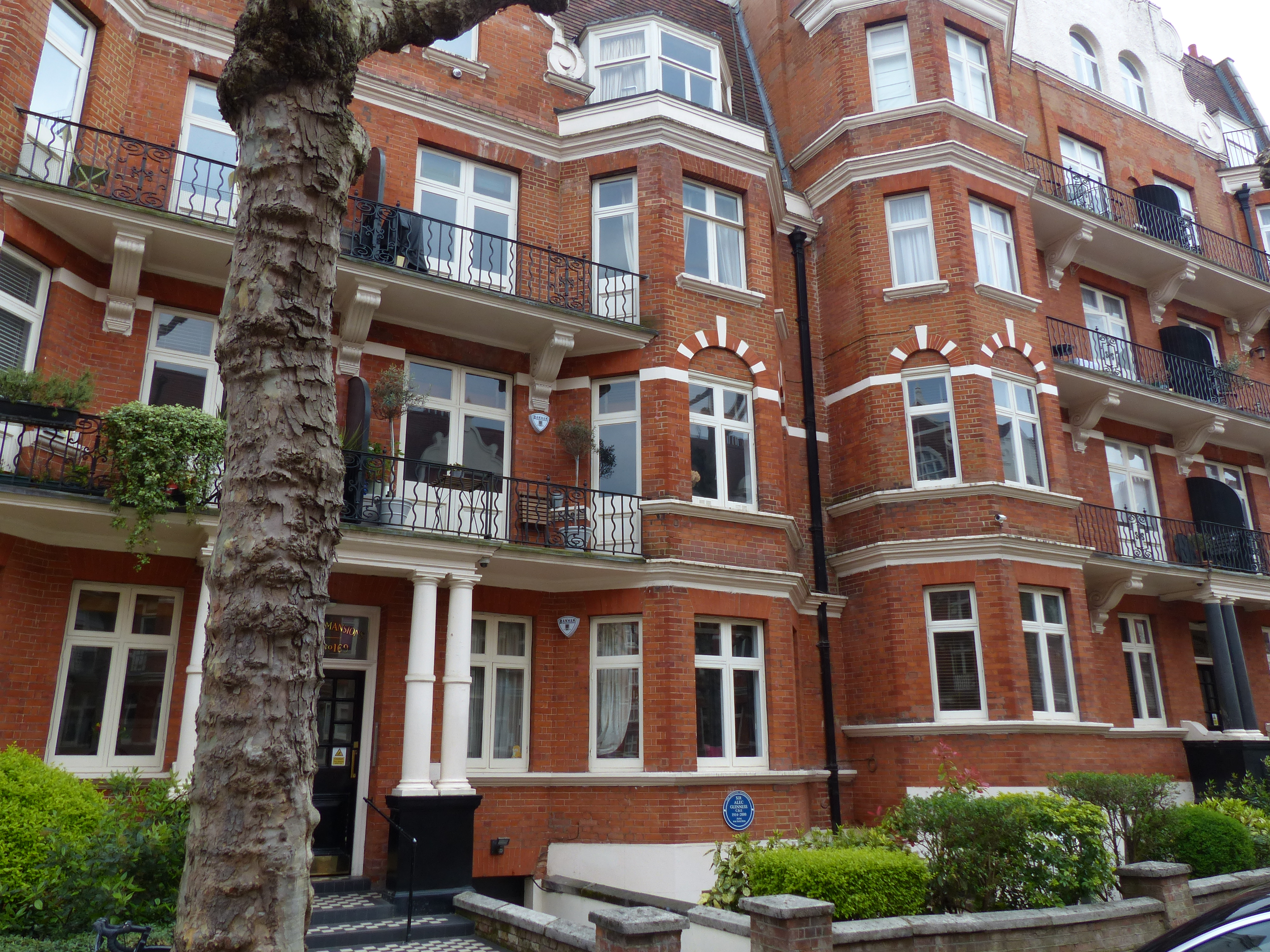
155 Lauderdale Mansions South in Maida Vale, west London where Guinness was born

Guinness was born Alec Guinness de Cuffe at 155 Lauderdale Mansions South, Lauderdale Road, in Maida Vale, London. His mother's maiden name was Agnes Cuff; she was born on 8 December 1890 to Edward Charles Cuff, a sometime lifeguard at Bournemouth who had served in the Royal Navy, and Mary Ann, née Benfield, of a family of stonemasons and publicans. On Guinness's birth certificate, his mother's name is given as Agnes de Cuffe; the infant's name (where first names only are placed) is given as Alec Guinness, and there are no details for the father.

The identity of Guinness's father has never been officially confirmed. Agnes Cuff had worked at Cowes on the Isle of Wight as a barmaid at the Royal Yacht Squadron clubhouse at the time of the Cowes Regatta in 1913, which was attended by several members of the Guinness family including Edward Guinness, 1st Earl of Iveagh, and his sons Ernest and Walter. Members of the Guinness family claimed a "distinct resemblance" between Alec and one or other of the Guinnesses at Cowes that year; Honor Guinness, who made Alec's acquaintance in 1950 and invited him to tea with "his cousin", later visiting Alec's family with photo albums and diaries to point out the similarities she perceived, believed either her uncle Ernest or his brother Walter ("a celebrated seducer") was Alec's father, while her cousin Lindy considered Alec closely resembled her father, Loel.

From 1875, under English law, when the birth of an illegitimate child was registered, the father's name could be entered on the certificate only if he was present and gave his consent. Guinness himself believed that his father was a Scottish banker, Andrew Geddes (1861–1928), who paid for Guinness's boarding-school education at Pembroke Lodge, in Southbourne, and Roborough, in Eastbourne. Geddes—who with a "round face and sticking-out ears" bore a resemblance to Guinness and believed himself to be his father—occasionally visited Guinness and his mother, posing as an uncle. Guinness's mother later had a three-year marriage to a Scottish army captain named Stiven, whose behaviour was often erratic or even violent.

=== Early career ===
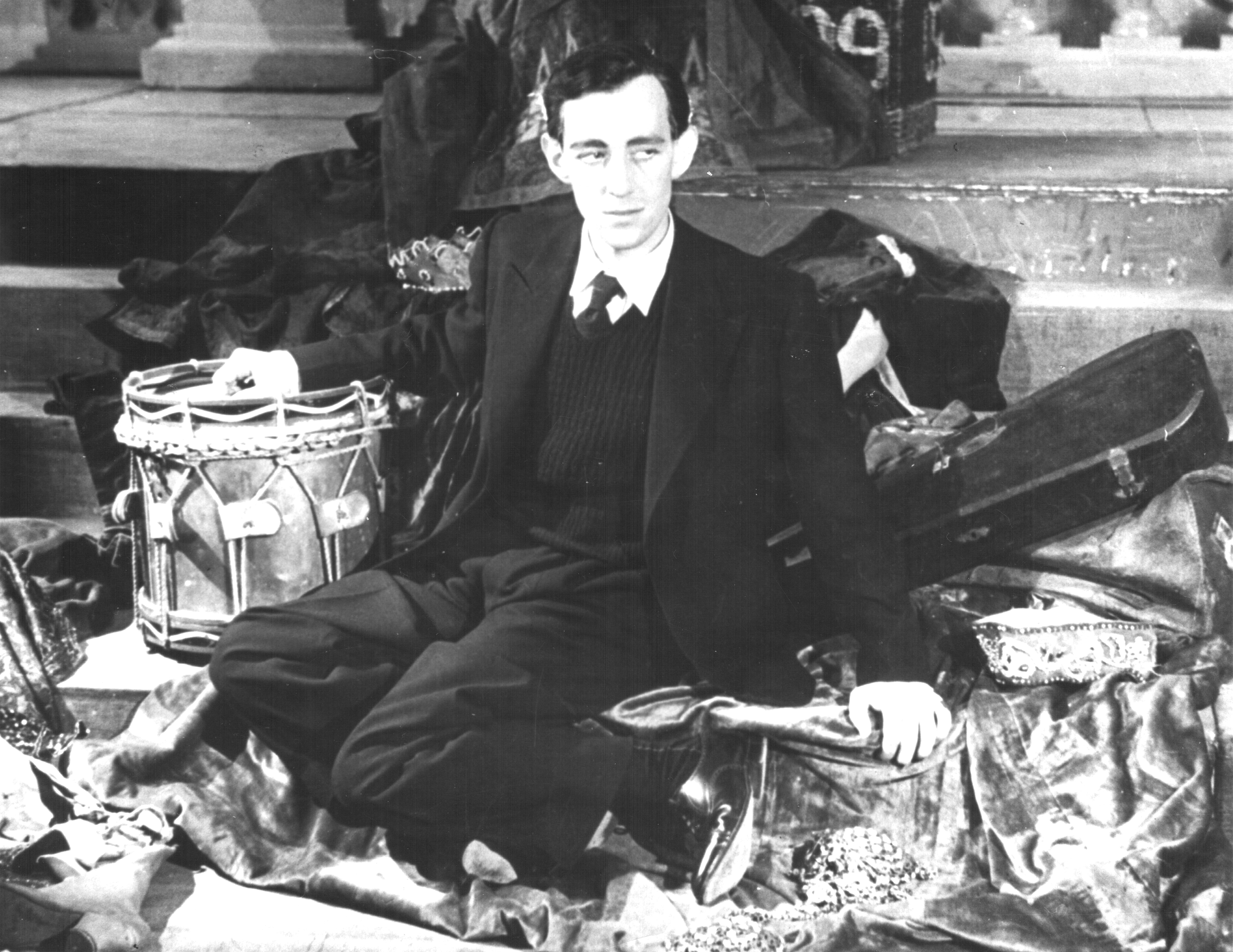
Guinness at the Old Vic theatre, London in 1938. Joining the company in 1936, early roles include Boyet in Love's Labour's Lost, Le Beau in As You Like It, and Osric in Hamlet.

Guinness first worked writing advertising copy. His first job in the theatre was on his 20th birthday (2 April 1934), while he was a student at the Fay Compton Studio of Dramatic Art, in the play Libel, which opened at the old King's Theatre, Hammersmith, and then transferred to the West End's Playhouse, where his status was raised from a walk-on to understudying two lines, and his salary increased to £1 a week. He appeared at the New Theatre in 1936 at the age of 22, playing the role of Osric in John Gielgud's successful production of Hamlet. Also in 1936, Guinness signed on with the Old Vic, where he was cast in a series of classic roles. In the later 1930s, he took classes at the London Theatre Studio. In 1939, he took over for Michael Redgrave as Charleston in a road-show production of Robert Ardrey's Thunder Rock. At the Old Vic, Guinness worked with many actors and actresses who became his friends and frequent co-stars in the future, including Gielgud, Ralph Richardson, Peggy Ashcroft, Anthony Quayle, and Jack Hawkins. An early influence was film star Stan Laurel, whom Guinness admired.

Guinness continued playing Shakespearean roles throughout his career. In 1937, he played Aumerle in Richard II and Lorenzo in The Merchant of Venice under the direction of John Gielgud. He starred in a 1938 production of Hamlet which won him acclaim on both sides of the Atlantic. He also appeared as Romeo in a production of Romeo and Juliet (1939), Malvolio in Twelfth Night, and as Exeter in Henry V in 1937, both opposite Laurence Olivier, and Ferdinand in The Tempest, opposite Gielgud as Prospero. In 1939, he adapted Charles Dickens's novel Great Expectations for the stage, playing Herbert Pocket. The play was a success. One of its viewers was a young British film editor, David Lean, who later had Guinness reprise his role in Lean's 1946 film adaptation of the novel.

=== Second World War ===
Guinness served in the Royal Navy Volunteer Reserve in the Second World War, initially as a seaman in 1941, before receiving a commission as a temporary Sub-lieutenant on 30 April 1942 and a promotion to Temporary Lieutenant the following year. Guinness then commanded a Landing Craft Infantry at the Allied invasion of Sicily, and later ferried supplies and agents to the Yugoslav partisans in the eastern Mediterranean theatre.

During the war, Guinness was granted leave to appear in the Broadway production of Terence Rattigan's stage play Flare Path, about RAF Bomber Command, with Guinness playing the role of Flight Lieutenant Teddy Graham.

=== Postwar stage career ===
Guinness returned to the Old Vic in 1946 and stayed until 1948, playing Abel Drugger in Ben Jonson's The Alchemist, the Fool in King Lear opposite Laurence Olivier in the title role, DeGuiche in Cyrano de Bergerac opposite Ralph Richardson in the title role, and finally starring in an Old Vic production as Shakespeare's Richard II. After leaving the Old Vic, he played Eric Birling in J. B. Priestley's An Inspector Calls at the New Theatre in October 1946. He played the Uninvited Guest in the Broadway production of T. S. Eliot's The Cocktail Party (1950, revived at the Edinburgh Festival in 1968). He played Hamlet under his own direction at the New Theatre in the West End in 1951.

Invited by his friend Tyrone Guthrie to join the premiere season of the Stratford Festival of Canada, Guinness lived for a brief time in Stratford, Ontario. On 13 July 1953, Guinness spoke the first lines of the first play produced by the festival, Shakespeare's Richard III: "Now is the winter of our discontent/Made glorious summer by this sun of York."

Guinness won a Tony Award for Best Lead Actor in a Play for his Broadway performance as Welsh poet Dylan Thomas in Dylan. He next played the title role in Macbeth opposite Simone Signoret at the Royal Court Theatre in 1966. Guinness made his final stage performance at the Comedy Theatre in the West End on 30 May 1989, in the play A Walk in the Woods. In all, between 2 April 1934 and 30 May 1989, he played 77 parts in the theatre.

=== Film career ===
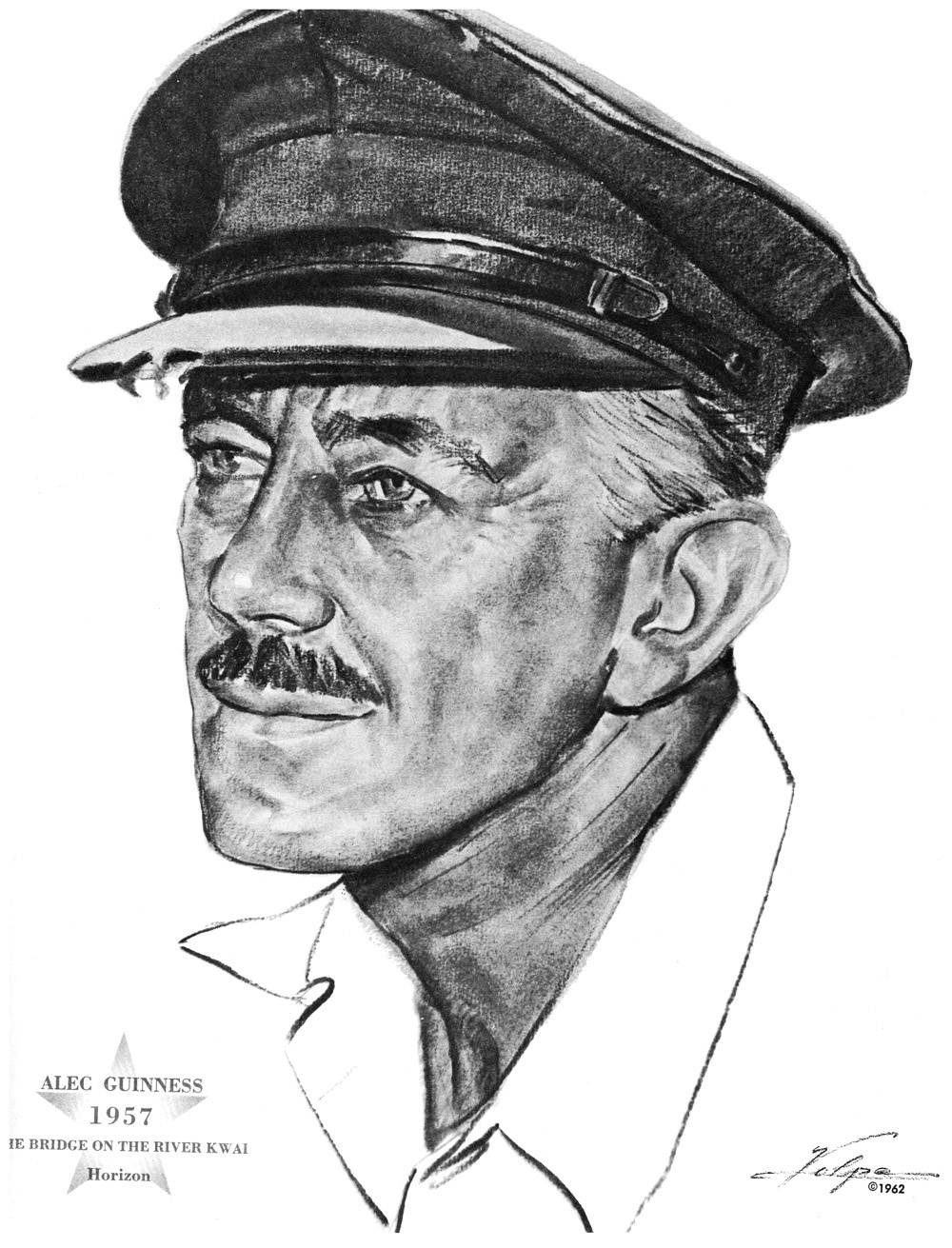
Drawing by Nicholas Volpe after Guinness won an Oscar in 1957 for his role in The Bridge on the River Kwai

Guinness made his speaking debut in film in the drama Great Expectations (1946). He was initially mainly associated with the Ealing comedies, and particularly for playing eight characters in Kind Hearts and Coronets (1949). His other films from this period included Oliver Twist (1948), The Lavender Hill Mob, The Man in the White Suit (both 1951) and The Ladykillers (1955), with all four, as well as Great Expectations and Kind Hearts and Coronets, ranked among the Best British films. In 1950, he portrayed 19th-century British prime minister Benjamin Disraeli in The Mudlark, which included delivering an uninterrupted seven-minute speech in Parliament. In 1952, director Ronald Neame cast Guinness in his first romantic lead role, opposite Petula Clark in The Card. In 1951, a poll of British exhibitors identified Guinness as the top box office attraction in British films and fifth in international films, based on box office returns. Guinness was idolised by Peter Sellers—who himself became famous for inhabiting a variety of characters in a film—with Sellers's first major film role starring alongside his idol in The Ladykillers.

Guinness's other notable film roles of this period included The Swan (1956) with Grace Kelly, in her penultimate film role, and The Horse's Mouth (1958), in which Guinness played the part of drunken painter Gulley Jimson, and for which he also wrote the screenplay, which was nominated for an Academy Award. Guinness' desire to make The Horse's Mouth led to a break with the Rank Organisation who refused to fund it, with the actor claiming John Davis, head of Rank, “told me that I was a funny man and if I ever made a serious film it would finish me off.”

He played the lead in Carol Reed's Our Man in Havana (1959); Marcus Aurelius in The Fall of the Roman Empire (1964); Lieutenant General Yevgraf Andreyevich Zhivago in Doctor Zhivago (1965), The Quiller Memorandum (1966); Marley's Ghost in Scrooge (1970); Charles I in Cromwell (1970); Pope Innocent III in Franco Zeffirelli's Brother Sun, Sister Moon (1972); and the title role in Hitler: The Last Ten Days (1973), which he considered his best film performance, though critics disagreed. Another role that is sometimes referred to as one he considered his best, and is also considered so by many critics, is that of Major Jock Sinclair in Tunes of Glory (1960). Guinness also played the role of Jamessir Bensonmum, the blind butler, in the 1976 Neil Simon film Murder by Death.

==== David Lean ====
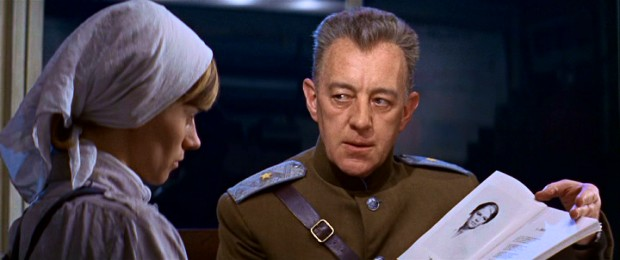
Guinness with Rita Tushingham in Doctor Zhivago (1965)

Guinness won particular praise for his collaborations with director David Lean, which today represent his most critically acclaimed work. After appearing in Lean's Great Expectations and Oliver Twist, he was given a starring role opposite William Holden in The Bridge on the River Kwai. For his performance as Colonel Nicholson, the unyielding British POW commanding officer, Guinness won both the Academy Award for Best Actor and BAFTA Award for Best Actor.

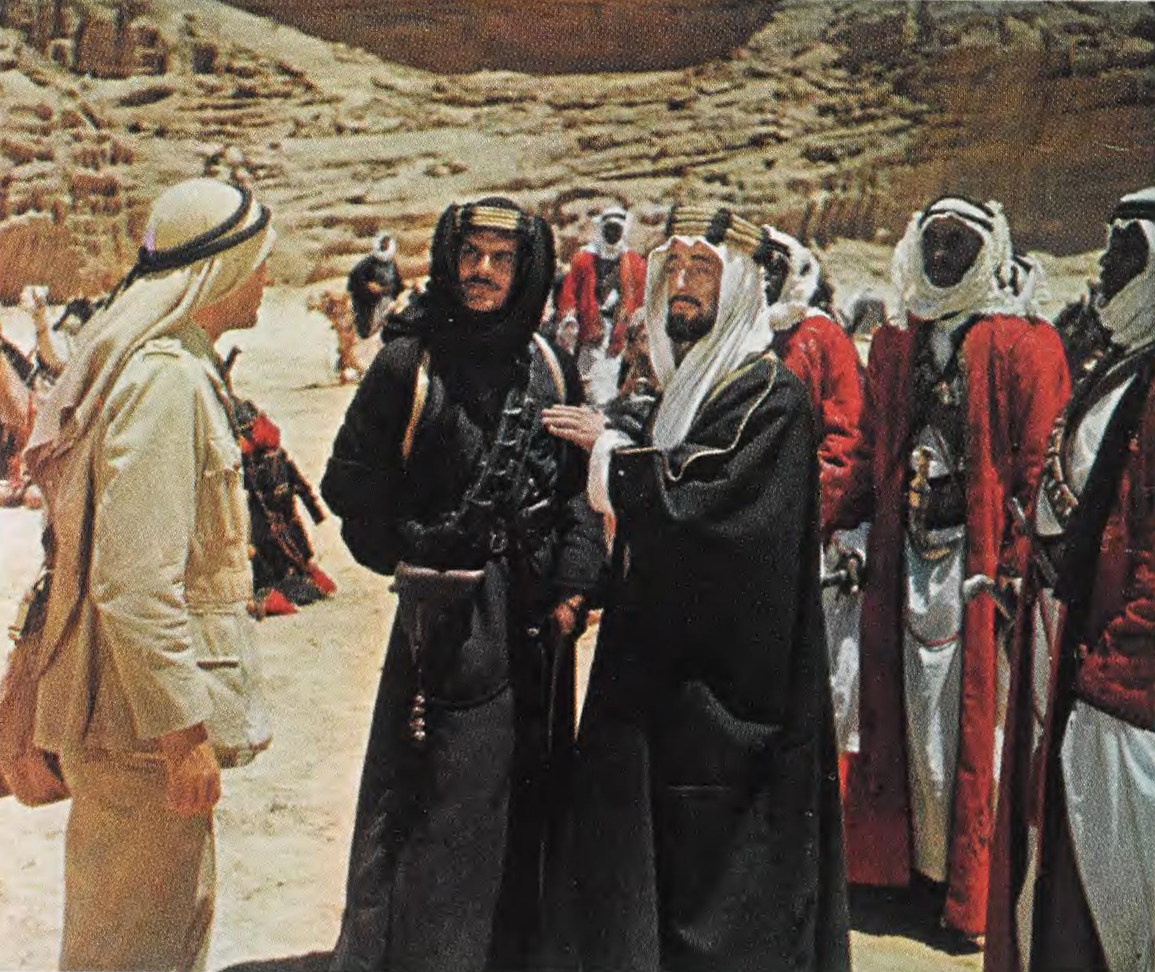
Guinness (foreground, third from right) with Peter O'Toole (left) and Omar Sharif in Lawrence of Arabia

Despite a difficult and often hostile relationship, Lean, referring to Guinness as "my good luck charm", continued to cast Guinness in character roles in his later films: Arab leader Prince Faisal in Lawrence of Arabia (1962); the title character's half-brother, Bolshevik leader Yevgraf, in Doctor Zhivago and Indian mystic Professor Godbole in A Passage to India. He was also offered a role in Lean's Ryan's Daughter (1970) but declined. At that time, Guinness "mistrusted" Lean and considered the formerly close relationship to be strained—although he recalled, at Lean's funeral, that the famed director had been "charming and affable". Guinness appeared in five Lean films that were ranked in the British Film Institute's 50 greatest British films of the 20th century: 3rd (Lawrence of Arabia), 5th (Great Expectations), 11th (The Bridge on the River Kwai), 27th (Doctor Zhivago) and 46th (Oliver Twist).

==== Star Wars ====
Guinness's role as Obi-Wan Kenobi in the original Star Wars trilogy, beginning in 1977 with Star Wars, brought him worldwide recognition to a new generation, as well as Academy Award and Golden Globe nominations. In letters to his friends, Guinness described the film as "fairy-tale rubbish" but the film's sense of moral good—and the studio's doubling of his initial salary offer—appealed to him. He agreed to take the part of Kenobi on the condition that he would not have to do any publicity to promote the film.

He initially negotiated a deal for 2% of the film's royalties paid to the director, George Lucas. Upon the warm reception of the film with the press and film critics, and as a gesture of good-will for the positive amendments and suggestions Guinness proposed to the screenplay for the film, Lucas offered Guinness an additional 0.5%, bringing his share to 2.5%. When Guinness asked Gary Kurtz for a written agreement, Kurtz revised Lucas's offering down by 0.25%, bringing Guinness's final, agreed-upon share of royalties paid to the director to 2.25% (Lucas received one-fifth of the overall box office takings, which would take Guinness's share of the overall box office to 1.80%).

Upon his first viewing of the film, Guinness wrote in his diary, "It's a pretty staggering film as spectacle and technically brilliant. Exciting, very noisy, and warm-hearted. The battle scenes at the end go on for five minutes too long, I feel, and some of the dialogue is excruciating and much of it is lost in noise, but it remains a vivid experience."

Guinness soon became unhappy with being identified with the part and expressed dismay at the fan following that the Star Wars trilogy attracted. In the DVD commentary of the original Star Wars, Lucas says that Guinness was not happy with the script rewrite in which Obi-Wan is killed. Guinness said in a 1999 interview that it was actually his idea to kill off Obi-Wan, persuading Lucas that it would make him a stronger character and that Lucas agreed to the idea. Guinness stated in the interview, "What I didn't tell Lucas was that I just couldn't go on speaking those bloody awful, banal lines. I'd had enough of the mumbo jumbo." He went on to say that he "shrivelled up" every time Star Wars was mentioned to him.

Although Guinness disliked the fame that followed and he did not hold the work in high esteem, Lucas and fellow cast members Mark Hamill, Harrison Ford, Carrie Fisher, Kenny Baker, and Anthony Daniels have spoken highly of his courtesy and professionalism, on and off the set. Lucas credited him with inspiring the cast and crew to work harder, saying that Guinness contributed significantly to achieving completion of the filming. Guinness was quoted as saying that the royalties he obtained from working on the films gave him "no complaints; let me leave it by saying I can live for the rest of my life in the reasonably modest way I am now used to, that I have no debts and I can afford to refuse work that doesn't appeal to me." In his autobiography, Blessings in Disguise, Guinness tells an imaginary interviewer "Blessed be Star Wars", regarding the income it provided. Guinness appeared in the film's sequels The Empire Strikes Back (1980) and Return of the Jedi (1983), as a force ghost apparition to the trilogy's main character Luke Skywalker.

In 2003, Obi-Wan Kenobi as portrayed by Guinness was selected as the 37th-greatest hero in cinema history by the American Film Institute. Digitally altered archival audio of Guinness's voice was used in the films Star Wars: The Force Awakens (2015) and Star Wars: The Rise of Skywalker (2019).

=== Television appearances ===
Guinness was reluctant to appear on television, but accepted the part of George Smiley in the BBC Television serialisation of John le Carré's Tinker Tailor Soldier Spy (1979) after meeting the author. Guinness reprised the role in Smiley's People (1982), and twice won the British Academy Television Award for Best Actor for his portrayal of the character. He received another nomination for best actor for his role in Monsignor Quixote in 1987. One of Guinness's last appearances was in the BBC drama Eskimo Day (1996).

== Awards and honours ==
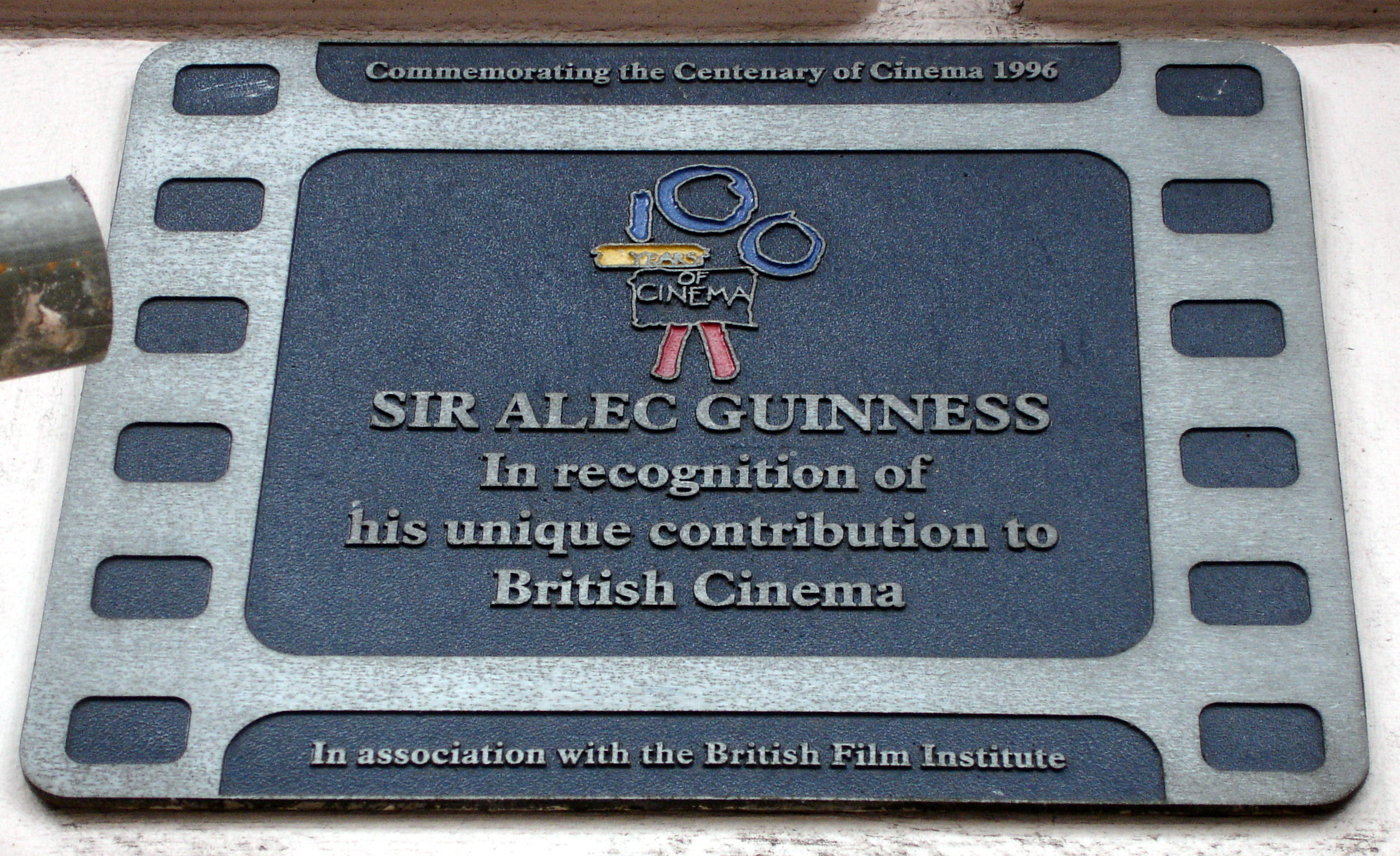
Plaque installed by the British Film Institute in the City of Westminster, London, in recognition of Guinness's contribution to British cinema

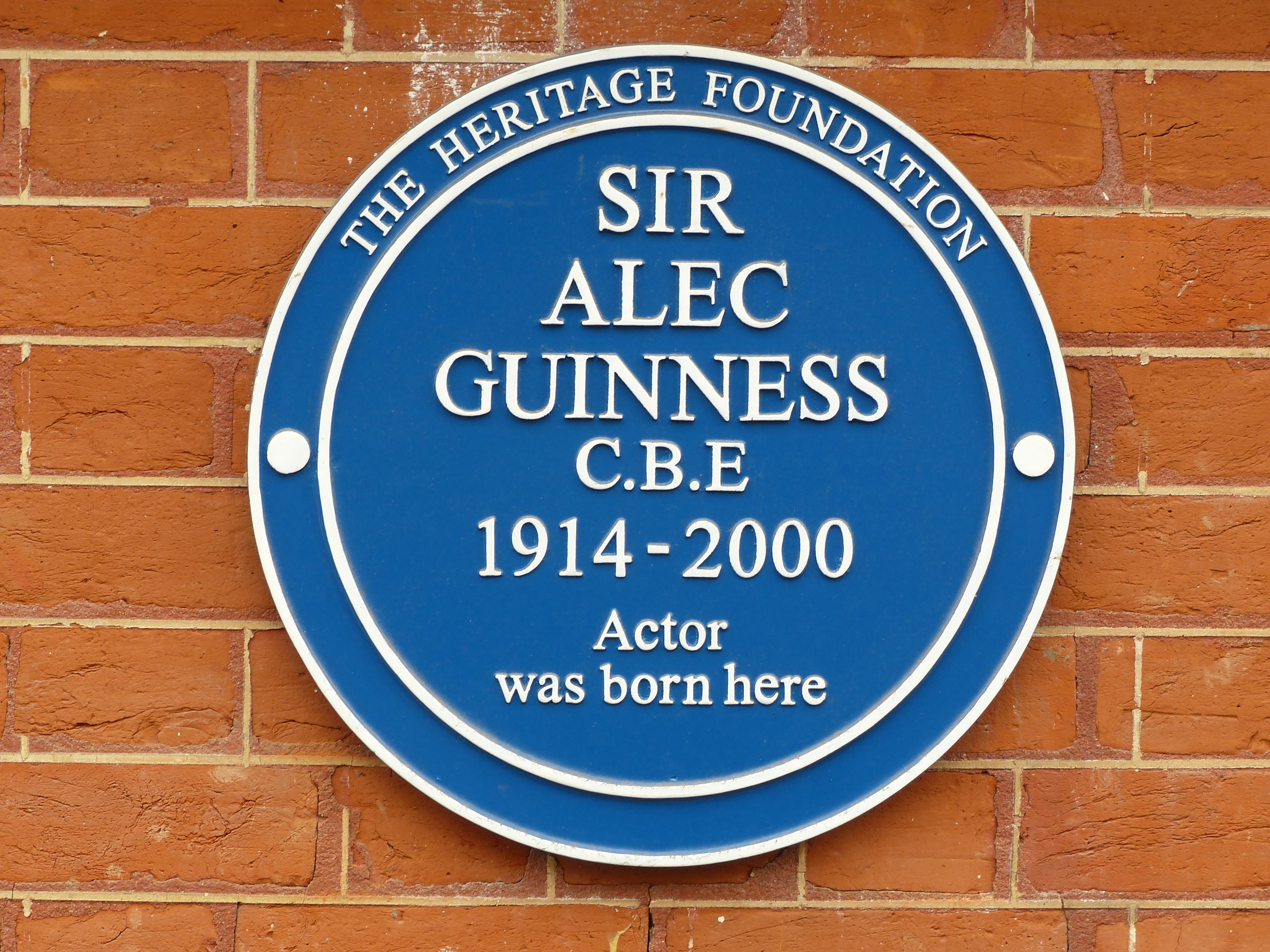
A blue plaque commemorates his birthplace in Maida Vale, London.

Guinness received an Academy Honorary Award for lifetime achievement in 1980. In 1985 the Hamburg-based Alfred Toepfer Foundation awarded Guinness its annual Shakespeare Prize in recognition of his life's work. He received the BAFTA Academy Fellowship Award for lifetime achievement in 1989.

For his theatre work, Guinness received an Evening Standard Award for his performance as T. E. Lawrence in Ross and a Tony Award for his Broadway turn as Dylan Thomas in Dylan. He received a star on the Hollywood Walk of Fame at 1559 Vine Street on 8 February 1960.

Guinness was appointed a Commander of the Order of the British Empire (CBE) in the 1955 Birthday Honours, was knighted by Elizabeth II in the 1959 New Year Honours, and was made a Member of the Order of the Companions of Honour in the 1994 Birthday Honours for services to drama. In 1991, he received an honorary doctorate from Cambridge University. In 2014, Guinness was among the ten people commemorated on a UK postage stamp issued by the Royal Mail in their "Remarkable Lives" issue.

== Personal life and death ==
Guinness married the artist, playwright and actress Merula Silvia Salaman (1914–2000) in 1938; in 1940, they had a son, Matthew Guinness, who later became an actor. From the 1950s the family lived at Kettlebrook Meadows, near Steep Marsh in Hampshire. The house itself was designed by Merula's brother Eusty Salaman. His great-grandson Nesta Guinness-Walker is a professional footballer.

A biography claimed that Guinness was arrested, charged and fined for a homosexual act in a public lavatory in Liverpool in 1946. Piers Paul Read, who wrote his authorised biography, did not believe it happened. Another biography suggests: "The rumour is possibly a conflation of stories about Alec's 'cottaging' and the arrest of John Gielgud, in October 1953, in a public lavatory in Chelsea, after dining with the Guinnesses at St. Peter's Square." This suggestion was not made until April 2001, eight months after his death, when a BBC News Online article related that new books claimed that Guinness was bisexual, that he had kept his sexuality private from the public eye and that only his closest friends and family members knew about his sexual orientation.

While serving in the Royal Navy, Guinness had planned to become an Anglican priest. In 1954, while he was filming Father Brown in Burgundy, Guinness, who was in costume as a Catholic priest, was mistaken for a real priest by a local child. Guinness was far from fluent in French, and the child apparently did not notice that Guinness did not understand him but took his hand and chatted while the two strolled; the child then waved and trotted off. The confidence and affection the clerical attire appeared to inspire in the boy left a deep impression on the actor. When their son was ill with polio at the age of 11, Guinness began visiting a church to pray. A few years later, in 1956, Guinness converted to the Catholic Church. His wife, who was of paternal Sephardi Jewish descent, followed suit in 1957 while he was in Ceylon filming The Bridge on the River Kwai, and she informed him only after the event.

Guinness told a story in a media interview and wrote in his memoir that he met James Dean and predicted Dean's death one week before he was killed in a car accident in 1955. In interviews shortly after Dean's death, Guinness recalled that all of Dean's friends had issued similar warnings because he drove too fast.

Every morning, Guinness recited verse eight from Psalm 143, "Cause me to hear your loving kindness in the morning".

=== Death ===
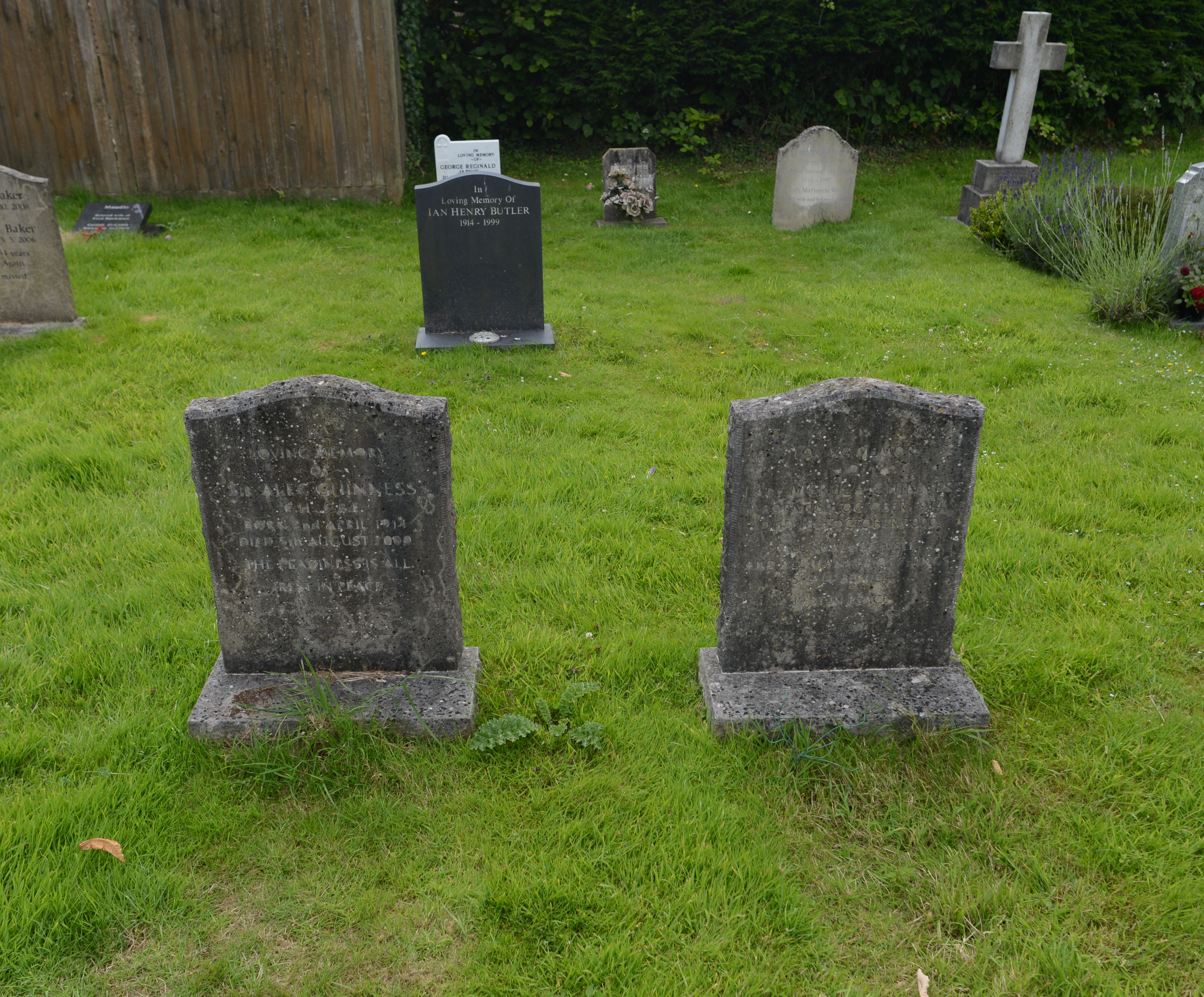
The graves of Alec and Merula in Petersfield, Hampshire

Guinness died on the night of 5 August 2000 at King Edward VII's Hospital in Midhurst, West Sussex. He had been diagnosed with prostate cancer in February 2000, and with liver cancer two days before he died. His wife, who died two months later on 18 October 2000, also had liver cancer. His funeral was held at St. Laurence Catholic Church in Petersfield, Hampshire, and he was interred at Petersfield Cemetery.

== Legacy ==
=== Archives ===
In 2013 the British Library acquired the personal archive of Guinness consisting of over 900 letters, manuscripts for plays, and 100 volumes of diaries from the late 1930s to his death.

=== Box office ranking in Britain ===
For a number of years, British film exhibitors voted Guinness among the most popular stars in Britain at the box office via an annual poll in the Motion Picture Herald.

- 1951: most popular British star in British films and fifth in international films.
- 1952: 3rd-most popular British star
- 1953: 2nd-most popular British star
- 1954: 6th-most popular British star
- 1955: 10th-most popular British star
- 1956: 8th-most popular British star
- 1958: most popular star
- 1959: 2nd-most popular British star
- 1960: 4th-most popular star

=== Autobiographies and biography ===
Guinness wrote three volumes of a best-selling autobiography, beginning with Blessings in Disguise in 1985, followed by My Name Escapes Me in 1996, and A Positively Final Appearance in 1999. He recorded each of them as an audiobook. Shortly after his death, Lady Guinness asked the couple's close friend and fellow Catholic, novelist Piers Paul Read, to write Guinness's official biography. It was published in 2003.

On 19 September 2025, it was announced Zeb Soanes would return to the stage to play Guinness, his hero, in a one-man-show, touring the UK in 2026. Soanes wrote to Guinness when he was aged 17 and received a handwritten note of encouragement. Two Halves of Guinness, by Mark Burgess, follows Guinness as he reflects on his distinguished but mysterious life and career, including his fears that he would only be remembered for the iconic role of the Jedi Knight Obi-Wan Kenobi in Star Wars. The play, directed by Selina Cadell, opened at the Watermill Theatre, Newbury on 29 January 2026 and transferred to the Park Theatre, London on 20 April.

=== Bibliography ===
- Guinness, Alec (1986). Blessings in Disguise. New York: Knopf. ISBN 0394552377.
- Guinness, Alec (1998). My Name Escapes Me. London: Penguin Books. ISBN 978-0-14-027745-6.
- Guinness, Alec (1999). A Positively Final Appearance: A Journal, 1996-98. London: Penguin Books. ISBN 978-0-24-113788-8.
- Read, Piers Paul (2003). Alec Guinness: The Authorised Biography. London: Simon & Schuster UK. ISBN 978-0-74-320729-4.

== See also ==
- Alec Guinness on stage and screen
- Alec Guinness: A Class Act
- List of Academy Award winners and nominees from Great Britain
- List of actors with Academy Award nominations
- List of actors with more than one Academy Award nomination in the acting categories
- List of actors with Hollywood Walk of Fame motion picture stars
- List of British actors
- Lists of knights bachelor
- List of LGBTQ Academy Award winners and nominees
