= Dombey =

Dombey may refer to:

- Dombey, West Virginia, an unincorporated community in Wood County
- Joseph Dombey, a French botanist

== See also ==
- Dombey and Son, a novel by Charles Dickens
