= Zelah Clarke =

British actress

- Born: 5 April 1954 (age 71)
- Occupation: actress
- Spouse: Francis Ash

Zelah Clarke (born 5 April 1954) is a British actress who has mainly appeared in television productions.

== Career ==
Clarke trained as a ballet dancer alongside Jenny Agutter and Fiona Fullerton. She began her career in small roles, including in West End musicals and theatre. She started to work as a television actor in 1972. Among her roles were Ceinwen Lloyd in How Green Was My Valley (1976) and Susan Nipper in Dombey and Son (1983). She also appeared in the first episode of Poldark (1975)

Clark is best known for playing Jane Eyre in the 1983 British television serial Jane Eyre, an adaptation of Charlotte Brontë's novel of the same name, produced for the BBC. The serial also starred Timothy Dalton as Edward Rochester. Clarke lamented in an interview that the role of Jane had virtually ended her career. She had received good reviews, she conceded, but for her, work had dried up while her co-star Timothy Dalton had become a star.

Clarke was nominated for a 1985 CableACE Award for Actress in a Movie or Miniseries for her portrayal of Jane Eyre.

Clarke has continued to undertake voice work recording audiobooks including, Nina Bawdin's Outside Child and Carrie's War, and Three Legged Friends.

== Reviews ==
Ed Hulse from Barnes and Noble wrote of Clarke's performance as Jane Eyre, " ... [she] makes a properly soulful Jane: reserved but courageous in her quiet way."

Mike Cummings for the All Movie Guide wrote,

Rarely has a motion picture presented a tale of romance with such subtlety, sensitivity, and power as this 1983 Julian Amyes adaptation of the Charlotte Bronte classic Jane Eyre. Credit Zelah Clarke (Jane) and Timothy Dalton (Edward Fairfax Rochester) for the success of the film. Perfectly cast in their roles as lovers separated by untold secrets and repressed emotions, they act beautifully together, mixing chemistry and charisma to produce the kind of magic that holds audiences in thrall.

== Private life ==
Clarke is married to BBC executive producer Francis Ash and they have a daughter Lamorna.

== Appearances Film/Television ==
Sourced from IMDb

Year	Title	Role	Year	Title	Role
1972	The Triple Echo (Film)	First Girl	1975	Poldark (Mini Series Ep. 1.1)	Woman in Coach
1976	How Green was my Valley (Mini Series)	Ceinwen Lloyd	1976	Shadows (Series)	Grizelda
1976	The Duchess of Duke Street (Series)	Kath	1977	A Christmas Carol (Movie)	Martha Cratchit
1978	Crown Court (Series)	Nadia Phillips	1978	A Woman's Place (Series)	Glenys
1978	The Lost Boys (Mini Series)	Wendy	1980	Richard's Things	Nurse
1981	BBC2 Playhouse (Series)	Jane	1983	Dombey & Son (Mini Series Ep. 1.1–1.10)	Susan Nipper
1983	Jane Eyre (Mini Series)	Jane Eyre	1983	Lady Jane	Lady Anne Wharton
1986	Casualty (Series 1 Ep.)	Ruth White	1987	No Place Like Home (TV series)	Mrs. Pilkington
1990	Perfect Scoundrels (Series 1 Ep.)	Estate Agent	1991	Dodgem (Series Ep. 1.1)	Magistrate
1993	Screen Two (Series)	Shop Assistant	1993	The Chief (Series Ep. 3.4)	Mrs Kelly

== Selected Appearances Plays ==
The plays were staged at the Open Air Theatre in Regents Park, London, all directed by David Conville, Richard Digby-Day and Christopher Biggins

Year	Title
1978	The Man of Destiny
1978	A Midsummer Night's Dream
1978	The Dark Lady of The Sonnets
