= Miracle in Soho =

1957 British film by Julian Amyes

- British quad poster by Renato Fratini
- Directed by: Julian Amyes
- Written by: Emeric Pressburger
- Produced by: Emeric Pressburger exec Earl St John associate Sydney Streeter
- Starring: John Gregson; Belinda Lee; Cyril Cusack
- Cinematography: Christopher Challis
- Edited by: Arthur Stevens
- Music by: Brian Easdale
- Production company: The Rank Organisation
- Distributed by: J. Arthur Rank Film Distributors
- Release date: 11 July 1957 (London premiere)
- Running time: 93 minutes
- Country: United Kingdom
- Language: English

Miracle in Soho is a 1957 British drama film directed by Julian Amyes and starring John Gregson, Belinda Lee and Cyril Cusack. It was written by Emeric Pressburger. The film depicts the lives of the inhabitants of a small street in Soho and the romance between a local road-builder and the daughter of Italian immigrants.

The film had its premiere on 11 July 1957 at the Odeon Leicester Square, preceded by the British Film Academy awards.

It was Emeric Pressburger's first movie after the dissolution of his partnership with Michael Powell.

== Plot ==
Michael Morgan is a labourer working with a gang, mending a road in Soho. While there he meets Julia Gozzi, an Italian shop assistant who works in a pet shop whose family is about to emigrate to Canada. Julia's brother Filippo is engaged to Gwladys, a local barmaid and wants to stay behind. Julia's elder sister Mafalda is also reluctant to leave as she has a chance to marry a prosperous cafe proprietor. Julia eventually falls for Michael, and stays, only to find Michael doesn't want her.

When Michael's job in Soho is finished, the affair is over, so Julia visits a local church and prays for him to come back. A miracle occurs when a burst water main brings the return of the road gang. Mike and Julia are reunited.

== Main cast ==
- John Gregson as Michael Morgan
- Belinda Lee as Julia Gozzi
- Cyril Cusack as Sam Bishop
- Peter Illing as Papa Gozzi
- Rosalie Crutchley as Mafalda Gozzi
- Marie Burke as Mama Gozzi
- Ian Bannen as Filippo Gozzi
- Brian Bedford as Johnny
- Barbara Archer as Gladys
- John Cairney as Tom
- Lane Meddick as Steve
- Billie Whitelaw as Maggie
- Julian Somers as Potter
- George A. Cooper as foreman
- Cyril Shaps as Mr. Swoboda
- Richard Marner as Karl
- Wilfrid Lawson as Mr Morgan (uncredited)
- Colin Douglas as supervisor

== Production ==
=== Development ===
Emeric Pressburger wrote the script in Paris in 1934 for director Kurt Gerron. It was originally called The Miracle in St Anthony's Lane and concerned German exiles in Paris. The film came close to being made in the 1930s, being optioned several times in France, but no movie resulted.

In the late 1930s Pressburger went into a highly acclaimed partnership with Michael Powell, under the banner of "The Archers", which lasted for nearly twenty years. Powell wrote in his memoirs that Pressburger was always interested in making a movie of Miracle claiming "it had been optioned in Berlin, in Paris, and in London, and had even made one flight to Hollywood for six months before returning to its author, minus a few feathers." Powell said Pressburger tried to sell him the project "but I wasn't having any. The story was loaded with Hungarian charm but it had no substance. It was a tender trap, a good fairy, a marshmallow, the sort of film that attracts and sucks in top talent like William Wyler, Margaret Sullavan and then leaves them floundering in the gooey mess." He also called the script "emasculated de Maupassant" which "shows its age by the delicate way it steps around sexual relationships" and "the people in the lane are the usual ethnic stereotypes."

In 1945 Pressburger announced he would direct and produce The Miracle in St Anthony's Lane independently of Powell but it was not made after Pressburger could not secure one of the three stars he wanted (Michael Redgrave, Robert Donat or Laurence Olivier). In May 1946 the film, along with The Small Back Room, was listed as being on the schedule of the Archers.

=== The Rank Organisation ===
In June 1954 Pressburger announced he and Powell would make Miracle as part of a slate of three films, the others being an adaptation of Die Fledermaus and a story of the scuttling of the Graf Spee called The Battle. Pressburger called Miracle "a love story - a sort of up-date of Seventh Heaven set in London's Soho district." The pair adapted Die Fledermaus as Oh... Rosalinda!! before making the Graf Spee picture as The Battle of the River Plate. British Lion wanted to make Miracle with Stanley Baker and Diane Cilento.

The Battle of the River Plate was a financial and critical success. The film was financed by the Rank Organisation, whose chairman, Sir John Davis was keen for Powell and Pressburger to make further films with the studio. Pressburger wanted the team to follow it up with three movies: Ill Met By Moonlight, Miracle in St Anthony's Lane and Cassie. During the production of Ill Met By Moonlight, Powell and Pressburger fought so much that their partnership terminated. Sir John Davis agreed to finance Miracle (which became Miracle in Soho) with Pressburger writing and producing for a fee of £11,000. Pressburger did not want to direct as he felt he was too close to the story (he had directed once before and not liked it). Davis allowed Pressburger to select a director from a short list of three young TV directors.

Powell felt Davis was "maneuvering Eric into a position he could not defend" and suggested that Pressburger ask a more experienced director like David Lean or Carol Reed, or Jack Cardiff, who had been cinematographer on several Powell-Pressburger movies. However Pressburger picked the TV director Julian Aymes. Powell later wrote in his memoirs that Aymes "couldn't direct traffic".

Aymes had been working mostly in TV but moved to features to make A Hill in Korea and Miracle in Soho. According to Aymes' obituary, "This was not a particularly happy time for Julian Amyes. He felt that the film business did not really suit him and he seemed to have to spend far too much of his time reading and rejecting bad scripts. For him the atmosphere of television was an altogether happier one where he felt he had much greater creative freedom."

Filmink argued "It’s odd that Rank greenlit this, notwithstanding the success of Pressburger’s two war movies, which had been, after all, war movies; maybe the executives were hoping for another A Kid for Two Farthings, another Soho story which had been a hit in 1955. Also, we can’t help shake the feeling that John Davis had a soft spot for movies that could have starred his wife Dinah Sheridan, even though he wouldn’t let her act anymore."

Pressburger decided to make the movie entirely in the studio. He hired Carmen Dillon to do the art direction; Dillon had worked on Laurence Olivier's films of Henry V and Richard III, and Pressburger wanted some of her theatricality.

=== Shooting ===
Filming started January 1957. The shoot took eight weeks and was finished by 15 March. John Davis saw a cut on 26 July.

== Reception ==
=== Box Office ===
According to a biography of David Lean the film was "a big flop" for which Sir John Davis blamed Emeric Pressberger and "made it plain that he had no future with Rank."

Pressburger's biographer said "the public stayed as far away as possible. If Emeric harboured delusions of a career as a solo producer, Miracle knocked them out of him.He was no longer a bankable propsect for the Rank Organisation."

=== Critical reception ===
Variety called it "a slow-moving sentimental yarn... a simple story that lacks punch and gives the impression that more could be made of the colourful material. It rates as fair entertainment that should cash in on the popularity of the stars... John Gregson never seems quite at home in rough clothes but makes a likeable personality... and Belinda Lee is simple and naive as the anglicized Italian girl in love with him."

The Monthly Film Bulletin said "This depressing production, with its synthetic Soho setting, has characters conceived strictly within the less happy conventions of British comedy. The lack of any style or pace in the writing needlessly vulgarises the central situation, though John Gregson and Belinda Lee do manage to convey a certain superficial charm."

Pressburger's biographer called it "a film with few redeeming features. Emeric had lugged the story around for so long he seems to have forgotten exactly what it was about. But the muddled plot and sledge hammer characterisation are not the only flaws. Carmen Dillon let him down badly. The sets are small, stolid and cramped and about as lacking in flair as they could be. As for the direction, it is utterly aimless."

Screenonline said "the film's evocation of Soho was outdated by 1957, too studio-bound and art-directed to capture the multi-ethnic authenticity it wanted. The huge sets, designed by Oscar-winning Carmen Dillon, complemented Pressburger's view of the magic that appears in everyday life, but in a climate increasingly dominated by social realism, the street looked stilted and fake. Despite this, and its frivolity, Pressburger's script depicts a communal Soho that would soon be submerged beneath its growing reputation as a centre of vice and exotica."

In a contemporary review, What's On in London called the film a "sentimental little fairy story...Peter Illing, as Papa, brings this coloured celluloid confection to life every time he comes on the screen, and Cyril Cusack, as the Salvationist postman, is very good, too. Of course, this isn't really Soho at all, but I don't suppose that's going to worry anyone except a few fussy Sohoians"; while more recently, the Radio Times wrote, "Pressburger's script aims for the sort of semi-documentary tone that had become fashionable at the time, but this romance...needed a little local colour to buck it up, not grey sociological pronouncements. Christopher Challis's grim images of Soho have a certain historical value, but, amid a plethora of dodgy accents, neither John Gregson nor Belinda Lee even comes close to convincing"; and ithankyouarthur wrote, "With far grittier kitchen sinks just around the corner, the film looks back rather than forward but still has a cosy charm all of its own and the magic realist tone you would expect from its author and producer."

=== Michael Powell ===
Powell wrote in his memoirs that he knew what Pressburger "was trying to get over in this mixture of fantasy, realism and superstition. It's a heady mixture that appeals to central Europeans and particularly Hungarians. They like shortcuts to a situation, and they jump from joke to joke." Powell disliked Amyes's direction and felt the set was "a shambles... which still gives me nightmares to remember." Powell wrote "I never saw so much plot in my life; everybody was drowning and swimming in plot and the Soho atmosphere was laid on so thick that you couldn't care whether St Anthony was watching over his flock or not." He also felt John Gregson was miscast in a role for which Stanley Baker would have been better suited. "John Davis had his way," wrote Powell. "This was the kind of film he wanted made at Pinewood Studios."

== Notes ==
- Powell, Michael (1995). Million Dollar Movie. Random House.
- Macdonald, Kevin (1994). Emeric Pressburger. Faber and Faber.
