= The Queen's Guards (film) =

1961 British film by Michael Powell

- Theatrical poster
- Directed by: Michael Powell
- Screenplay by: Roger Milner
- Story by: Simon Harcourt-Smith
- Produced by: Michael Powell
- Starring: Daniel Massey; Raymond Massey; Robert Stephens; Jack Watson; Peter Myers
- Cinematography: Gerry Turpin
- Edited by: Noreen Ackland
- Music by: Brian Easdale
- Production company: Imperial Films
- Distributed by: 20th Century Fox
- Release date: 11 October 1961 (London)
- Running time: 110 minutes
- Country: United Kingdom
- Language: English

The Queen's Guards is a 1961 British military drama film directed by Michael Powell from a script by Simon Harcourt-Smith and Roger Milner. It stars Daniel Massey, Raymond Massey, Robert Stephens, and Ursula Jeans.

Principal photography on The Queen's Guards began several months after the release of Powell's Peeping Tom, the outcry over which eventually ensured that The Queen's Guards would be Powell's last feature film directed in Britain.

Powell later called the film "the most inept piece of filmmaking that I have ever produced or directed. I didn't write the story (weak) or the screenplay (abysmal) but I take all the flak."

== Plot ==
The film tells the story of John Fellowes, an officer in the Grenadier Guards as he prepares for the Trooping the Colour ceremony on 11 June 1960. John is the son of retired guardsman Capt. Fellowes and Mrs. Fellowes. John's elder brother was also a Guards officer, but was killed in action; John feels that he is being forced to follow in his brother's footsteps.

The film follows John through his training, where he makes some mistakes in an exercise and is told that it was a mistake like that which got his brother and a lot of his men killed at an oasis.

However, he makes friends with Henry Wynne-Walton and Henry is invited home to meet Mr. and Mrs. Fellowes. Mr. Fellowes is quite fanatical about the Guards. The eldest son in the family has been a Guards officer for as long as anyone can remember, and they even live next door to the Guards barracks in London.

Capt. Fellowes is disabled: his legs do not work, and he hauls himself around the house by hooking canes into loops on an overhead rail. This system was designed by the elder brother that John is always expected to live up to. His mother thinks that the elder brother is just "missing in action" and will return someday. The father, who knows the brother is actually dead, but appears never to give John a chance.

John is dating Ruth (Judith Stott), the daughter of George Dobbie, a haulage contractor. When John goes to see Mr. Dobbie, he tells John that he was fighting in the desert and was let down by a platoon of Guards that were meant to hold a certain position – the platoon that was led by John's brother.

Months later, John is in command of a unit of Guardsmen involved in a combat operation in an unnamed desert country. John leads an assault on a fortress held by some rebels. All the time that he is haunted by thoughts about how his brother died, John manages to defend against a counter-attack, until Henry arrives with his men in their armoured scout vehicles. The mission is a success. John has managed to do what his elder brother could not.

Back in London, all is in readiness for the Trooping the Colour ceremony. Mr. Dobbie overcomes his dislike of the Guards to accompany Ruth to the ceremony. Capt. Fellowes manages to haul himself upstairs to see the ceremony through the window. John is given the honour of commanding the colour party.

== Cast ==
- Daniel Massey as John Fellowes
- Robert Stephens as Henry Wynne-Walton
- Raymond Massey as Capt. Fellowes
- Ursula Jeans as Mrs. Fellowes
- Judith Stott as Ruth Dobbie
- Elizabeth Shepherd as Susan
- Frank Lawton as Commander Hewson
- Duncan Lamont as Wilkes
- Peter Myers as Gordon Davidson
- Ian Hunter as Mr. George Dobbie
- Jess Conrad as Dankworth

=== Cast notes ===
- Raymond Massey was the father of Daniel Massey and Anna Massey, who had one of the main roles in Powell's Peeping Tom.
- This was the only occasion Raymond and Daniel Massey appeared on film together. Powell had worked with Raymond Massey several times before, but it was Daniel Massey's film debut.

== Production ==
Powell says the film was based on the idea of a friend of his, Simon Harcourt-Smith, who was inspired watching the Household Cavalry outside Buckingham Palace. His basic idea was to encapsulate the story of a British military family with the ceremony of Trooping the Colour, where the climax would be the arrival of the Queen to take the salute. Powell was enthusiastic: "I'm a sucker for stories about the services," he said.

He sold the story to 20th Century Fox and the Queen gave her permission to film the Trooping of the Colour. Roger Milner wrote a script. Powell liked Milner, but said he was "more a sketch artist than a full blown dramatist" and "our collaboration was uneasy." He later said the film was "a broken backed feature when it should have been a family saga and an epic of military glory... We shouldn't have tried to compete with AEW Mason."

Powell formed Imperial Films with Sydney Streeter to make the film.

Though released as "A CinemaScope Picture" with a CinemaScope credit at the beginning of the film, The Queen's Guards was filmed in Technirama. 35mm Technirama release prints were compatible with CinemaScope release prints.

The intention of the film appears to have been to promote the Guards regiment in some way. Powell was given access to the Guards' barracks and to their training areas on Salisbury Plain, and in March 1960 he and several crew members were invited by the War Office to accompany the Guards on a NATO exercise in Libya. Powell also included many sequences of real guardsmen at the Trooping the Colour ceremony; the colour trooped on the day shown (Saturday 11 June 1960) was that of the 3rd. Bn. Grenadier Guards. However, principal photography on the film only began in the last week of August.

The production, especially the plot, has been described as "very scrappy", with details left unexplained. According to the second assistant director Michael Klaw, the script was rewritten constantly during production. Klaw says that although the action scenes were set in Kenya during the Mau Mau Uprising, the Guards never actually served in Kenya. Sequences set in Libya were meant to be shot on location, but the studio cut the budget at the last minute, so they had to be filmed in England.

== Historical background ==
When on ceremonial duties outside Buckingham Palace, Windsor Castle and at Horse Guards Parade, the Regiments of Guards wear red dress uniforms and Bearskins (not Busbys). Originally the sovereign's own troops, and some of the oldest regiments in the British Army. They perform most of the ceremonial duties at state occasions, but they are not just "toy soldiers" intended only for public display. They are fighting regiments that also do ceremonial duties. One of the main aims of the film was to show this.

There are two mounted regiments of guards, the Life Guards and the Blues and Royals. There are five regiments of foot, the Grenadier Guards, the Coldstream Guards, the Scots, Welsh and Irish Guards. The mounted regiments can be differentiated by the colour of their uniforms (Life Guards – red, Blues & Royals – blue) and the regiments of foot by the arrangement of their buttons (and their cap badges and collar tabs if you get close enough). Grenadiers have evenly spaced buttons on the front of their tunics, Coldstream have buttons in pairs, Scots in threes, Irish in fours and Welsh in fives.

In their combat roles, the Guards are light armoured and reconnaissance troops. In A Bridge Too Far (1977), Michael Caine leads a squadron of Irish Guards to spearhead the ground-based push towards Arnhem.

The ceremony of "Trooping the Colour" dates back to the distant past. "The Colour" is the regimental flag with all their battle honours on it. So that they could properly recognise the flag, and thus know which side they were on and where they should rally, the Colour would be paraded (trooped) in front of the regiment in a special parade before a battle. This was then turned into a ceremony. Because of the importance attached to the Colour, it is considered a great honour to be the soldier actually carrying it (the ensign), one of the Colour party protecting it, or to be in charge of the Colour party.

== Reception ==
The Queen's Guards had its premiere at the Carlton cinema on Haymarket, London on 11 October 1961. It went on release on the Rank Circuit from 23 October. It almost entirely disappeared after its initial release. Contemporary reviews of it were not kind, and it had only a short run in cinemas, and was shown on British television just once.

The Monthly Film Bulletin wrote: "Michael Powell's flag-waving museum piece would be distressing if it weren't so inept. The chauvinistic plot is inefficiently dovetailed, flashback-style, into the newsreel pageantry of the Trooping the Colour. The Masseys – Daniel and Raymond – battle manfully with dialogue and characters as dated as a Crimean cavalry charge. The film could barely be taken as a tribute to the Guards except, just possibly, by elderly aunts in Cheltenham."

Alexander Walker in the Evening Standard called the filmed pageant breathtaking but noted that, as a fictional story of how Guards think and behave out of uniform, it was less impressive.

Michael Powell said that 20th Century Fox, who had invested £280,000 in the film, "didn't like the film... they didn't understand it." They considered the film unacceptable to American exhibitors and did not release the film in the United States.

== Notes ==
- Powell, Michael (1992). Million dollar movie. Random House.
