= Folklore, legends and myths in Dombey and Son =

Dombey and Son
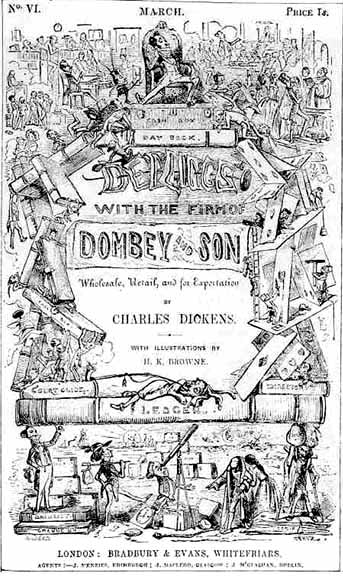
- Author: Charles Dickens
- Language: English
- Genre: Novel
- Published: 1848
- Publisher: Bradbury and Evans
- Publication place: England
- ISBN: 1-85326-257-9
- Preceded by: Martin Chuzzlewit
- Followed by: David Copperfield

Dombey and Son, published in 1848, draws from popular literature influenced by folklore, contemporary melodramas, and traditional pantomime. It incorporates numerous songs, particularly those celebrating maritime themes, as well as elements from fairy tales and ancient myths, such as those of Argus and the Cyclops.

These influences are presented without their original burlesque or solemn themes, instead being enriched with moral and spiritual depth. The narrative retains familiar structures, featuring characters who undergo trials, face potential deaths, and encounter opportunities for rebirth. This aligns with the novel's themes of punishing the wicked, subtly rewarding the virtuous, and redeeming the protagonist, Mr Dombey. Through a journey of self-reflection and the challenges imposed by fate, Mr Dombey ultimately confronts his flaws and discovers a path toward enlightenment.

The serious elements of the novel often adopt a playful tone, allowing Charles Dickens to integrate aspects of comedy and satire. This is exemplified by the diverse cast of characters, who serve as subjects of his wit and critique.

== Popular stories ==
Charles Dickens is often noted for maintaining close connections with the people of his early life, frequently visiting the streets of London and Chatham, where he became acquainted with local peddlers. A prominent example of this is his friendship with the ballad seller Silas Wegg. Dickens collaborated with a small theatre troupe, primarily composed of family members and a few close friends, to stage pantomimes and playlets featuring travelling actors or clowns.

=== Legend of Dick Whittington ===
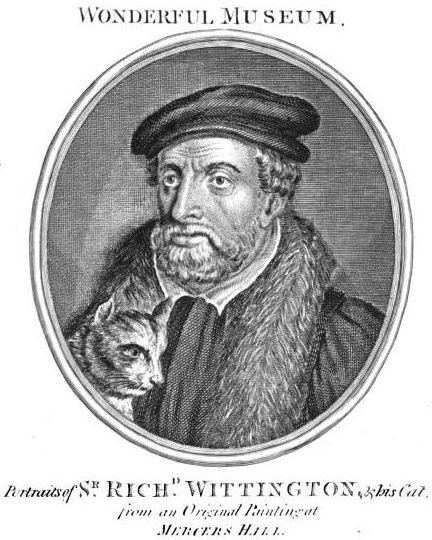
Richard Whittington and his Cat (The New Wonderful Museum, and Extraordinary Magazine, 1805).

In his correspondence, Dickens highlighted that the relationships among the main characters and the accompanying imagery in his works are influenced by the legend of Dick Whittington, a tale that had been popularized in modern theatre.

The characters of Susan Nipper and Walter Gay in Dombey and Son are inspired by contemporary plays: Black-Eyed Susan from 1829 by Douglas Jerrold, and Dick Whittington and His Cat by Albert Smith respectively. The legend of Dick Whittington, who became Lord Mayor of London, dates back to the 17th century and was particularly prominent when Dickens was developing his novel. Smith introduces original characters into the legend, including a fierce cook reminiscent of Susan Nipper and an ambitious hypocrite similar to Carker, who gains the trust of his employer, Mr Fitzwarren, to further his schemes.

Walter Gay serves as a "counterpoint to Dick Whittington". Although direct references to the legend are infrequent, they are strategically woven into his narrative. Like Whittington, Walter is an orphan navigating the business world with optimism, yet he encounters persecution and conspiracy. However, the novel diverges from the legend as Dickens’ protagonist ventures to sea and marries Florence, whereas in Smith's adaptation, Whittington's cat is sent off to sea while he remains a victim of misfortune. Whittington's only solace is found in the church bells of Bow, which celebrate the cat's success in ridding a kingdom of rats and acquiring wealth.

Mr Dombey bears a strong resemblance to Fitzwarren, as both are driven by mercantile obsession, leading to familial neglect. Florence parallels her ancestor, Alice, forming a friendship with Susan Nipper and seeking comfort from the household's cantankerous maid. Additionally, Solomon Gills briefly references the famous Bow bells in Dombey and Son, while the rats return in a "reversed role", fleeing at the first sign of danger, which symbolizes Dombey's impending downfall. The imagery of cats also resurfaces in the character of Carker, accumulating feline associations throughout the narrative.

=== Jolly Jack Tar Stereotype ===
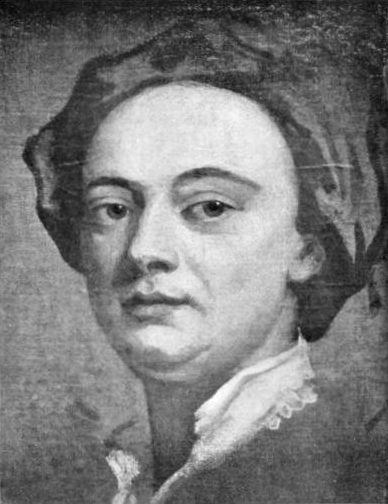
John Gay

Jack Tar (also spelled Jacktar, Jack-tar, or simply Tar) originally referred to sailors in the Merchant Navy or the Royal Navy, particularly during the height of the British Empire's expansion, and later came to identify all seafaring people. The term is often associated with the sea shanty "Jolly Jack Tar", which portrays a confident young sailor who overcomes significant challenges, marries the admiral's daughter, and concludes his story with a patriotic finale.

In Dombey and Son, numerous nautical references draw from the small world of "The Wooden Midshipman", particularly concerning the character Walter Gay. Solomon Gills's shop is depicted as an unsinkable ship navigating the currents of the City, with the small back parlour serving as the captain's quarters. Dickens describes Walter Gay as "the most wooden of midshipmen", reflecting both his character and the nautical theme. The name "Gay", closely linked to Susan Nipper in the early chapters, evokes John Gay, the author of the popular sea shanty "Sweet William's Farewell to Black-Eyed Susan" (1720), as well as a melodrama by Douglas Jerrold that was well-received during the period.

Walter Gay's ballad takes the form of a dramatic duet between William, a generous and loyal foresail sailor, and Susan, the innocent young woman he must leave behind as duty calls. This narrative employs several traditional genre clichés, such as the contrast between steadfast love and the unpredictable sea, the union of the delicate young lady and the gruff sailor, and the notion that love ultimately triumphs over adversity. In contrast, Douglas Jerrold's melodrama emphasizes the bride's humble domestic life and the unjust hardships endured by the sailor.

Many characters and relationships from Jerrold's work are reflected in Dombey and Son. For instance, the merchant Doggrass embodies Mr Dombey's reduction of human relationships to mere market shares; he alienates his daughter and consigns the hero to distant lands, leading both to a profound solitude. However, the novel diverges by ultimately redeeming the lost merchant through his child and attributing Walter's modest success to his virtues. Walter's relationship with Florence replaces the fallen father, establishing firm spiritual foundations in the City.

Certain traits, while often adapted, align Dombey and Son with the conventions of nautical melodrama. For example, Susan Nipper marries Mr Toots, who resembles Gnatbrain from the fable, while Florence shares characteristics with Dolly Mayflower, marked by her cheerful demeanour and flowery name. Walter Gay is supported by his "crew", Solomon Gills and Captain Cuttle, whose joyful spontaneity echoes the traditional chorus of sailors. Additionally, Cuttle's enthusiastic incoherence, punctuated by verbal outbursts drawn from the Book of Common Prayer and the repertoire of sea shanties, adds to this nautical atmosphere.

== Theatrical Cliché Reformulated into Myth ==
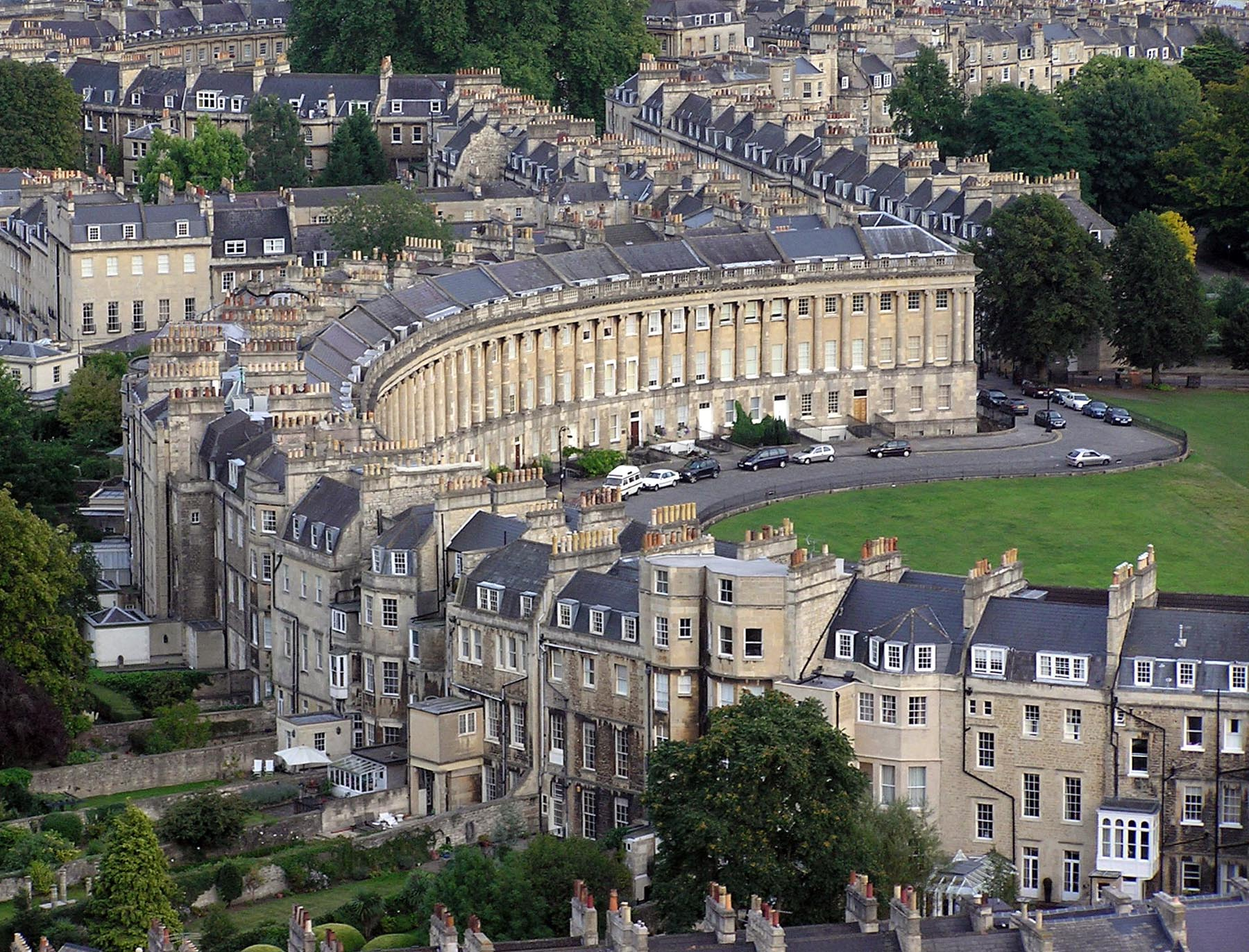
The Royal Crescent in Bath.

In Dombey and Son, Charles Dickens examines the contrasts between sea and land, sailors and landlubbers, and humanity and materialism. In the early chapters, the Dombey house, anchored to the ground yet commercially dependent on maritime trade, stands in stark opposition to Solomon Gills's shop, which, while entirely oriented toward the sea, is situated within a bustling market environment. Metaphorically, the Dombey house appears to be a conqueror, looking confidently toward the future, yet it is ultimately destined for failure. In contrast, Gills's shop, though fragile and seemingly obsolete, serves as a resilient vessel of the human spirit, navigating the challenges of commercial life.

Materialistic values are portrayed as vulnerable to the whims of fortune and change, tethered to the City and fashionable locales such as the spa town of Leamington, the seaside resort of Brighton, the resort of Bath, or the dangerous Paris. Conversely, human solidarity is associated with those guided by the navigation instruments of life toward prudence, humility, and altruism, or with those who, cast upon the reefs of adversity, find refuge in what may seem a barren desert but is, in fact, an oasis of kindness and salvation. Characters like Solomon Gills, Captain Cuttle, Florence, Walter, Susan, Toots, and even Mr Dombey ultimately discover their way to an "island of compassion." Thus, the sea serves as a constant backdrop in the novel, rich with symbolic connotations. John Hillis-Miller observes that “the sea of death [...] is the authentic symbol of a nonhuman power whose chief characteristics are reconciliation and continuity”, suggesting that it represents a realm beyond earthly existence where the reciprocity of love becomes possible.

The death of the first Mrs. Dombey is metaphorically described as a shipwreck, with the dying woman finding hope in "the light she clings to", representing her love for her daughter, Florence. Similarly, Mr Dombey perceives the passing of Little Paul, who dies at the age of nine, as the loss of his ship, "The Heir Son", foreshadowing the family's impending financial ruin. For other characters, Little Paul's death symbolizes a journey to the afterlife on a sea of love, a language that he understood and shared only with the eccentric old man from Brighton Beach. Florence, during her honeymoon, also interprets the waves as conveying a similar message, while Solomon Gills reflects, "Some of our lost ships [of his nautical instruments], freighted with gold, have come home, truly".

Throughout the novel, nearly all characters embark on a metaphorical voyage on the waves before returning to shore, establishing a clear contrast: the materialists - such as Dombey, Carker, Alice Marwood, and Edith Granger - inevitably face disaster, humiliation, or death. In contrast, humanists, firmly grounded, achieve relative prosperity and happiness through their alignment with authentic moral forces. Dickens skilfully weaves elements of nautical legend and popular melodrama into his narrative. While Albert Smith and Douglas Jerrold sought to create burlesque parodies, Dickens transforms these influences into a parable rich in symbolism and mythical significance without altering the core action.

== Fairy Tales and Myths ==
John Forster described Dombey and Son as a "fanciful rendering of reality", using "fanciful" to imply an imaginative quality. Some critics refer to Dickens's novels as realistic fairy tales. Forster also noted that "no one felt a more intense affection than [him] for nursery rhymes and tales, and that he felt a secret delight in thinking that he conferred on them a nobler status by his art."

=== Fairy Tales ===
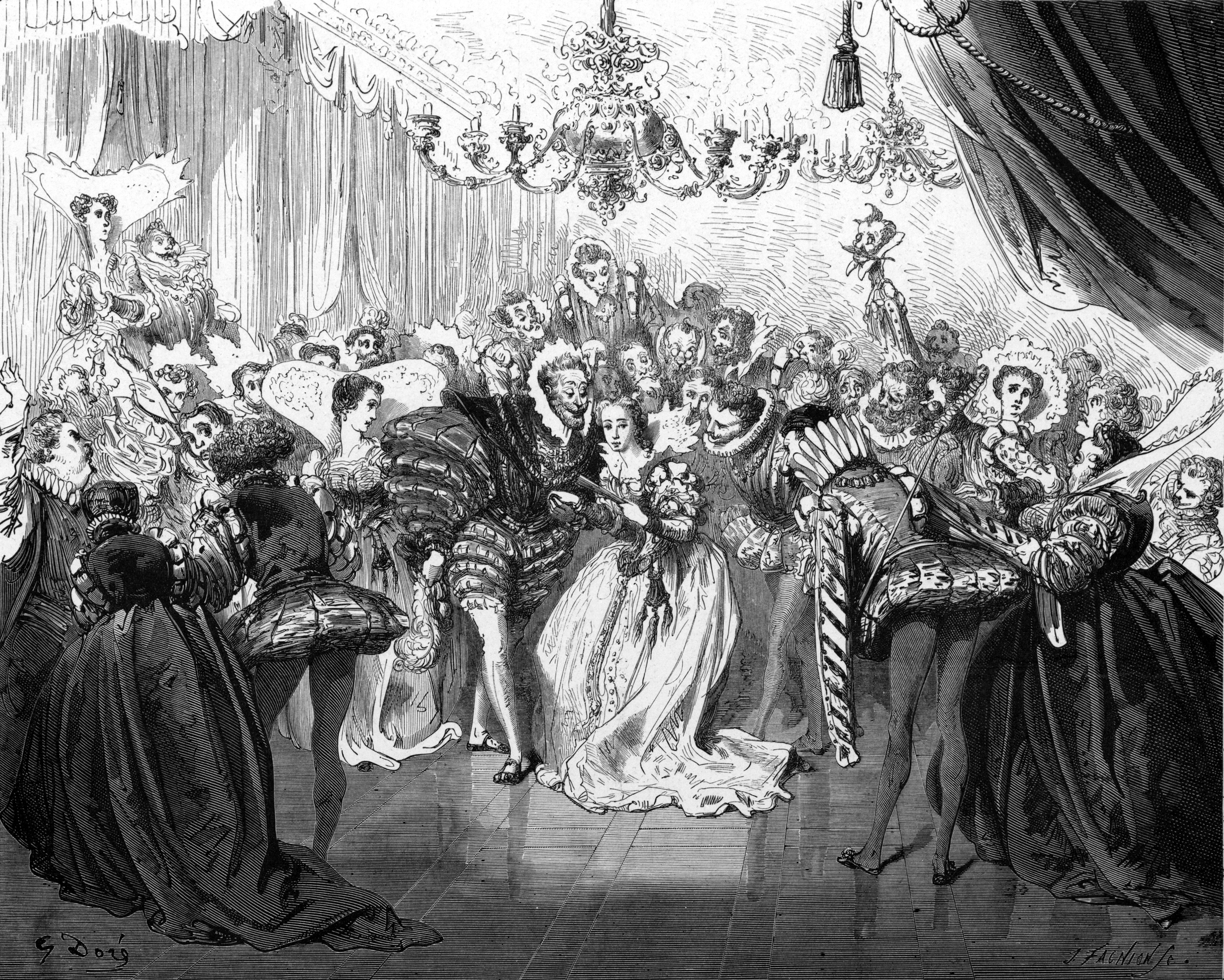
Cinderella, by Gustave Doré, 1897.

Dickens draws extensively from popular culture, including tales, ballads, and songs. In "The Christmas Tree", an autobiographical narrative that Simon Callow finds "almost Proustian", Dickens writes, "Little Red Riding Hood was my first love. I feel that, if I could have married her, I would have known perfect happiness." This admission intrigues Bruno Bettelheim, who, in The Uses of Enchantment, comments: "Even when world-famous, Dickens acknowledged the deep formative impact that the wondrous figures and events of fairy tales had had on him and his creative genius [...] Dickens understood that the imagery of fairy tales helps children better than anything else in [...] achieving a more mature consciousness to civilize the chaotic pressures of their unconscious."

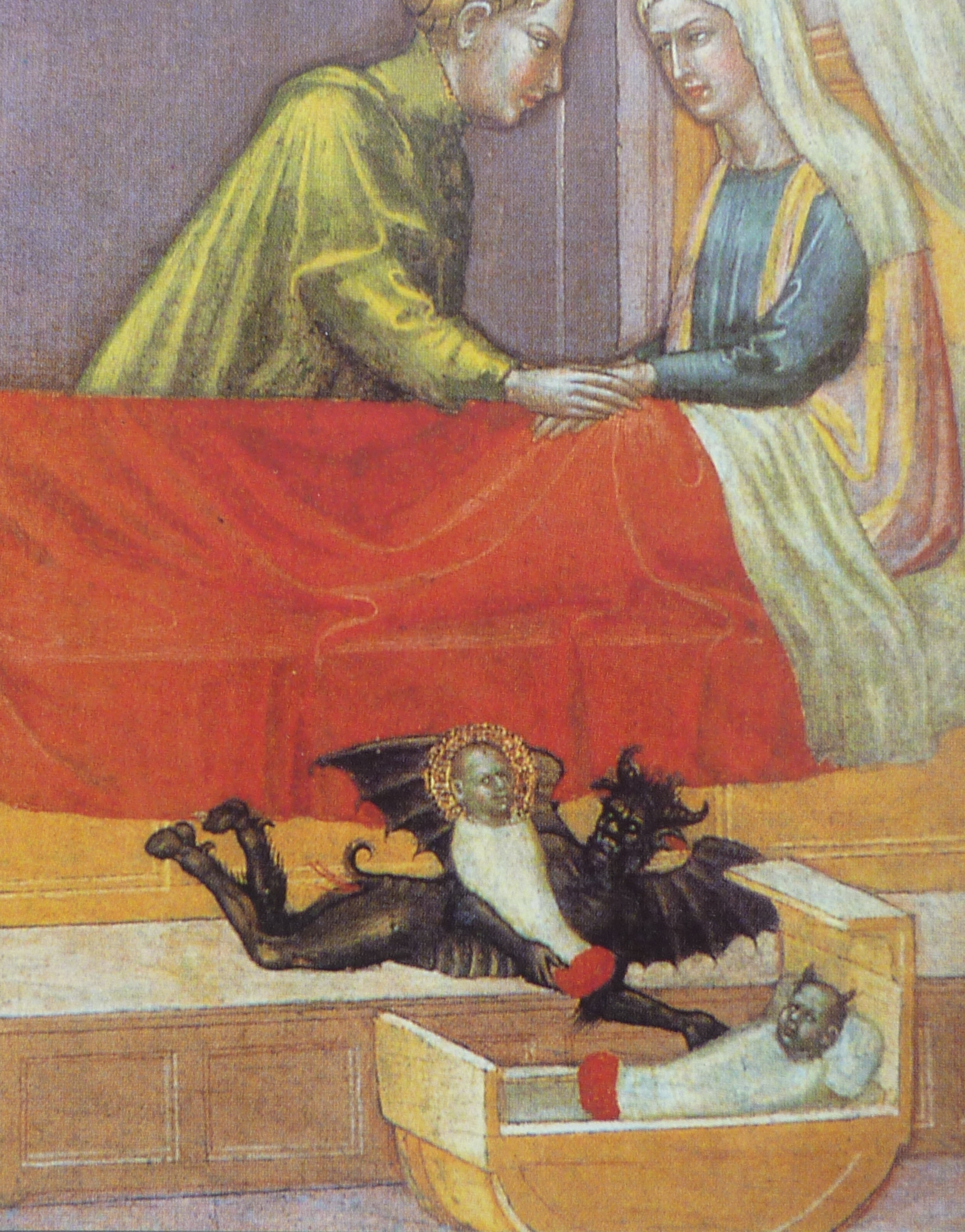
The Devil steals an infant and leaves a changeling. Martino di Bartolomeo, Scenes from the story of Saint Etienne, detail, 15th century.

Florence Dombey is often likened to Cinderella, living under her father's strict authority. Bruno Bettelheim notes that the final part of the novel makes subtle references to the iconic slipper from the fairy tale, particularly in the description of their wedding morning in Chapter 57. As Florence and Walter walk to the church, they choose "the quietest streets", and the narrator captures their happiness by stating, "Not even during their ancient childish stroll were they farther from the surrounding world. The feet of the children of yesteryear did not tread on the ground as wonderful as the one they tread on today." Bettelheim discerns a significant echo in the imagery of steps and feet, though his psychoanalytic interpretations may invite debate.

Throughout the novel, various places and characters embody fairy tale archetypes. For example, Mrs Pipchin resides in what can be described as an "ogress's castle", filled with musty odours, creeping insects, and plant life that appears almost sentient, blurring the lines between flora and fauna. Her demeanour, always clad in black, lends her a theriomorphic quality, complemented by a "croaking" voice reminiscent of a toad and serpent-like piercing eyes. On the other hand, "Good Mrs Brown" is depicted as unattractive and, like Mrs Pipchin, dressed in all black. Her arms, covered with rough skins, contribute to her witch-like appearance as she mutters unintelligible incantations amidst a chaotic array of rags, bones, and ashes. Lurking in the shadows like a tigress, her gaze and tense, crooked fingers create an unsettling image, ready to pounce on her prey—Florence—by pulling her hair. (Note: Allusion to William Blake's poem (1794), "Tyger! Tyger! burning bright. In the forests of the night".) These vivid portrayals underscore the novel's deep connections to fairy tale motifs.

Mr Dombey's mansion can be seen as a setting for an ever-awake Sleeping Beauty, caught in a state of temporal stasis without hope of rescue from a Prince Charming. The narrator describes the place using litotes to deny any miraculous connection, subtly alluding to it as: "[...] No magical abode from a wonderful story" or "There were not the two dragons as sentinels [...] as often in legends, stationed there to watch over the imprisoned innocence".

In a departure from traditional interpretations that cast Little Paul as a premature prophet, some views suggest he may represent a changeling—an infant or young child abandoned by fairies. (Note: In European folklore, a "changeling" or "changelin" is a decoy left by fairies, trolls, elves (or other creatures of the Little People) in place of a newborn human whom they kidnap.) Anne Chassagnol characterizes him as a malformed being, experiencing mental disabilities and the effects of serious illnesses, reflecting the Victorian imagination's tendency to see him as a victim of a malevolent fairy. She points out that it was not until 1866 that psychiatrist John Langdon Down scientifically identified the origins of such ailments, which further contextualizes the perceptions of Little Paul within the novel. (Note: Down syndrome, also known as trisomy 21, is named after John Langdon Down.)

=== Archetypes and Myths ===
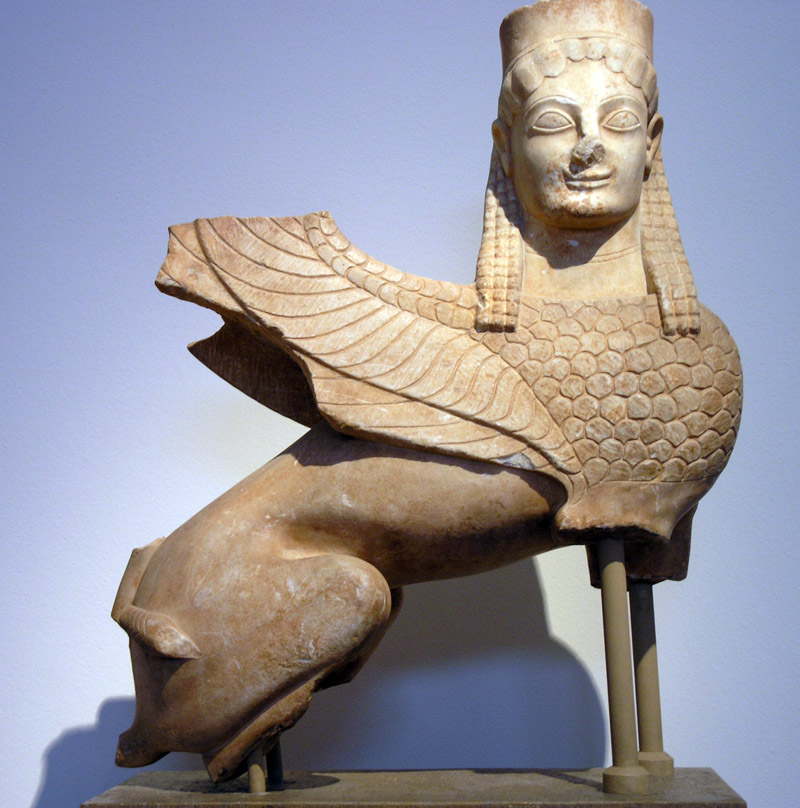
Archaic funerary sphinx, circa 570 BCE, National Archaeological Museum, Athens.

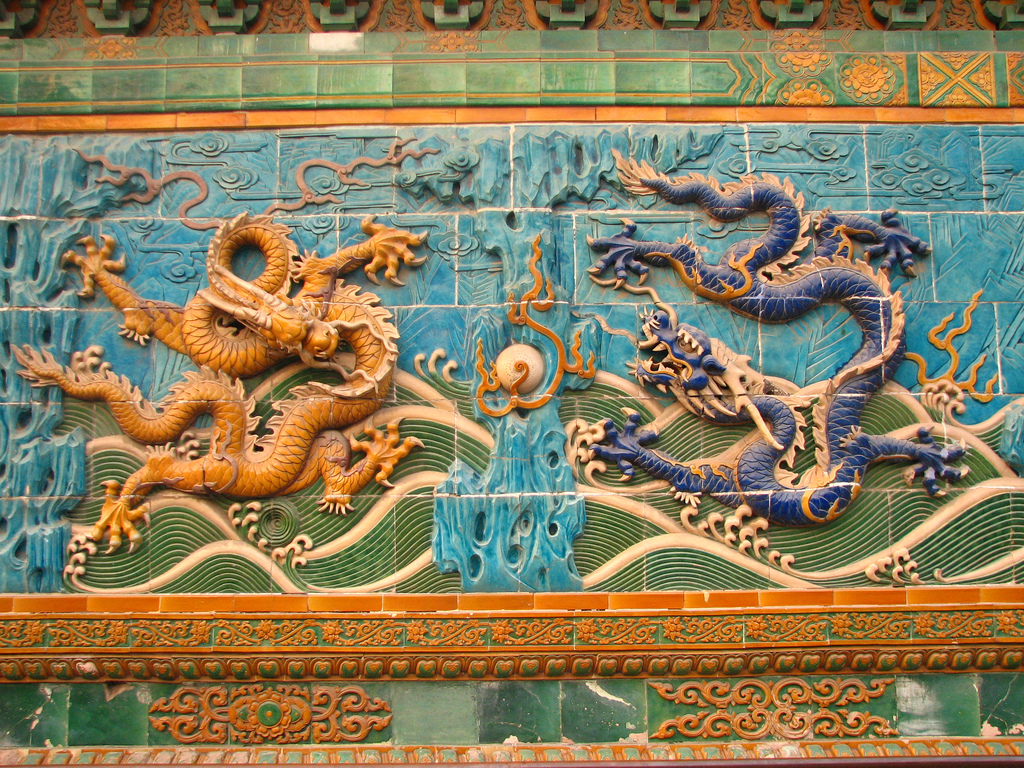
Painted bas-relief of imperial dragons in Beijing.

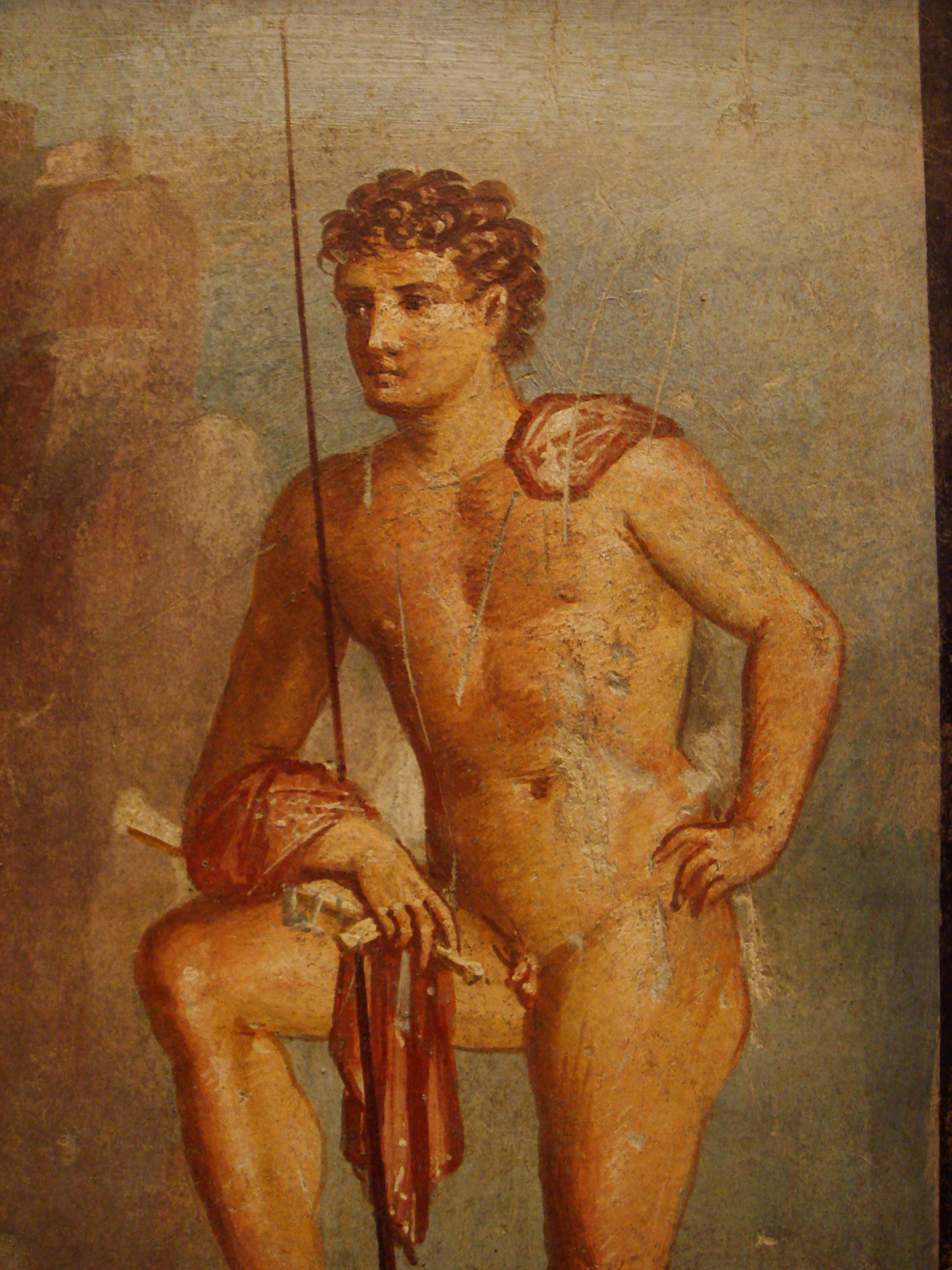
The Pompeii Argus.

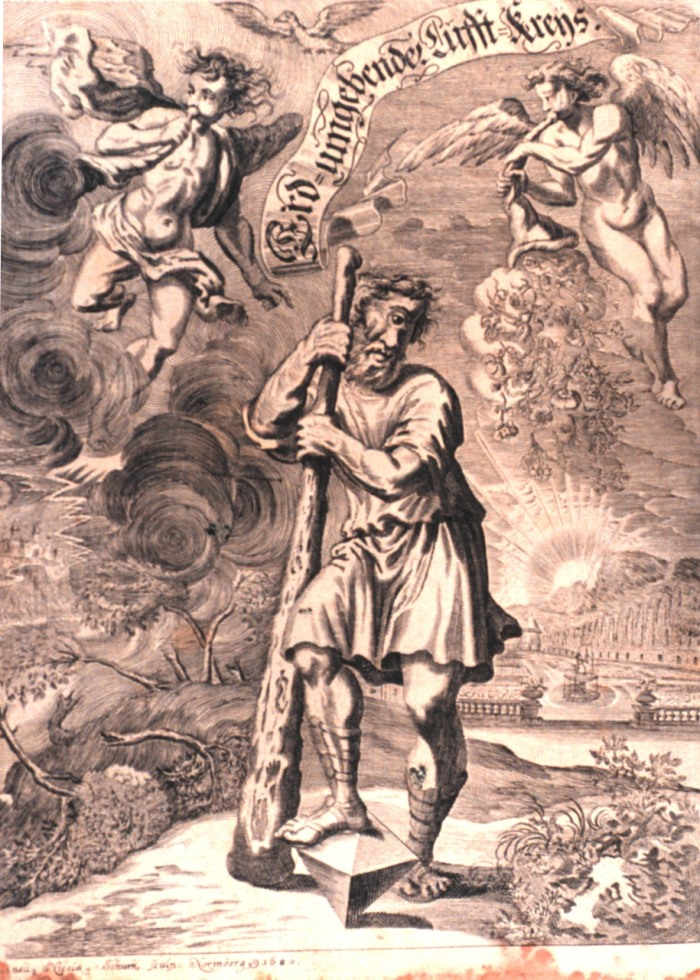
Cyclops, illustration from 1680.

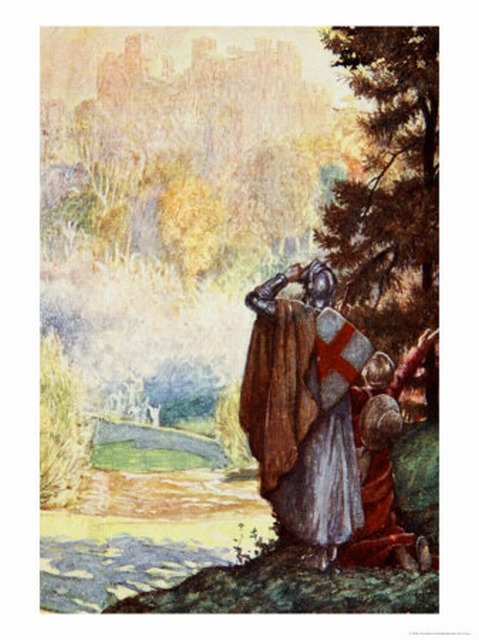
The Pilgrim's Progress, by Byam Shaw.

Lucien Pothet explains that "The continuity of myth-legend-epic-modern literature has been highlighted many times [...] Let us simply recall that mythical archetypes served in a certain way in the great modern novels. The trials that a character in a novel must overcome have their model in the adventures of the mythical Hero. Secularized, degraded, camouflaged, these myths and mythic images are found everywhere: one only needs to recognize them."

Dombey and Son contains numerous allusions to archetypes and myths, although they are often subtly reshaped by Dickens’ imagination before being woven into the fabric of the novel. As a result, most of the key characters are symbiotically associated with elemental and cosmic forces.

A notable example is Little Paul, who converses with the waves and understands their language, suggesting a deep connection to nature. Florence, too, embodies water, as Julian Moynahan observes, particularly through "the abundance of her tears." In the chapter describing Mr Dombey's transformation, it is revealed that "at last, [he] gauges the importance of the liquid element, the sea, the river, and the tears, and this awareness amounts to an unconditional surrender." Prior to this realization, Mr Dombey is often associated with stone, mirroring the characteristics of Mrs Pipchin, who is defined by chalk and flint. This connection renders him a chthonic figure, almost subterranean, existing in an environment where life withers and dies due to a lack of light, as reflected in the recurring references to mire and mould in his home.

Dickens extensively employs the pathetic fallacy to create parallels between human emotions and the cosmos. The novel unfolds, except for its conclusion, in a perpetual state of November, characterized by coldness, dampness, greyness, and an overarching darkness. This atmosphere is palpable: dawn is described as "shivering", rain as "melancholic", drops as "weary", and the wind as "languishing and moaning with pain and sorrow", while the trees "shiver with fear." In Mr Dombey's environment, chandeliers and candelabras are depicted as shedding a "monstrous tear."

Conversely, characters in the novel often take on animalistic qualities, elevating the narrative's bestiary beyond mere comic irony, as analyzed by Michael G. Gilmour. This transformation borrows from ancient mythology and biblical references. For instance, Blimber is portrayed as an indecipherable sphinx, embodying the unyielding nature of stone. Carter adeptly shifts between the personas of a velvet-pawed cat and more ferocious creatures like a wolf or shark. Good Mrs Brown is likened to a crab, while Major Bagstock possesses "lobster eyes." Mr Perch, named after a voracious fish, ironically finds himself "hooked", whereas Mr Toots remains a "chick of the coop." Florence, imprisoned and wounded, is likened to a bird in a cage with broken wings, her innocence reminiscent of a turtledove. Her father takes on the role of a bird of prey, while her guardians have the air of wild beasts. Even the railway, likened to a dragon, symbolizes the archetypal obstacle that the hero must overcome, morphing into a theriomorphic symbol spewing fire, belching black vapours, and sporting glowing red eyes in the darkness.

Dombey and Son incorporates allusions to figures like Argus (Note: Argus was given the epithet of Panoptes (Πανόπτης / Panóptês, "the one who sees all") because he had a hundred eyes, spread all over his head, or even all over his body according to some authors: Fifty eyes sleep while fifty watch, so it is impossible to deceive his vigilance.) and the Cyclops. (Note: Cyclops are fantastic creatures from Greek mythology. They are giants with only one eye in the middle of their foreheads. Their name comes from the ancient Greek κύκλωψ / kýklôps, formed from κύκλος / kýklos ("wheel" or "circle") and ὤψ / ốps ("eye"), which could be translated as "round eye.") The novel frequently references the piercing and inquisitive eyes of its malevolent characters. For instance, Carker's eyes are described as sharp as teeth, capable of withering adversaries with their fiery gaze, while Mrs Brown's eyes shoot lightning, creating patterns that streak through the shadows of her lair. The Cyclops, with his singular eye, symbolizes the role of the spy, mirroring Carker's ability to paralyze Commander Cuttle from a distance and Mr Dombey's furtive observations.

Central to the narrative is the myth of trial and rebirth, exemplified through Walter's nautical tribulations, which echo the terrestrial challenges faced by John Bunyan's Pilgrim in The Pilgrim's Progress (1678). Mr Dombey's moral journey reflects a similar arc; as a victim of pride, he endures the loss of his son, a loveless marriage, bankruptcy, and a year-long illness. This suffering ultimately leads to his rebirth as a more self-aware individual, recognizing his past negligence. This pattern of trial and rebirth has roots in earlier literature, such as Daniel Defoe's Robinson Crusoe (1719). Crusoe's initial ignorance of divine signs leads to his shipwreck, subsequent despair, and eventual spiritual awakening after he encounters a passage from the Bible that resonates with his plight. Additionally, the spiritual autobiographies of the nineteenth century, like William Hale White's The Autobiography of Mark Rutherford and Mark Rutherford’s Deliverance, further explore the concept of inner pilgrimage, reflecting a similar journey of self-discovery and redemption.

== See also ==
- Charles Dickens
- Dombey and Son

== Appendices ==
=== Bibliography ===
- Dickens, Charles (1995). Dombey and Son. Ware: Wordsworth Editions Limited. ISBN 1-85326-257-9.
- Dickens, Charles (1864). Dombey et Fils [Dombey and Son] (in French). Translated by Bressant. Paris: Hachette. OCLC 644300756.
- Monod, Sylvère (1953). Dickens romancier (in French). Paris: Hachette.
- John Forster (1872–1874). The Life of Charles Dickens. Londres: J. M. Dent & Sons.
- Hillis-Miller, John (1958). Charles Dickens, The World of His Novels. Harvard: Harvard University Press.
- Cockshut, A. O. J. (1962). The Imagination of Charles Dickens. New York: New York University Press. ISBN 0814700926. EAN: 9780814700921.
- Moynahan, Julian (1962). Dickens and the Twentieth Century. Toronto: John Gross et Gabriel Pearson, University of Toronto Press.
- Axton, William (1964). "Dombey & Son: From Stereotype to Archetype". ELH. Vol. 31. Baltimore/Washington: Johns Hopkins University Press. pp. 301–317.
- Tillotson, Kathleen (1968). "New Readings in Dombey & Son". Imagined Worlds: Essays on Some English Novels and Novelists in Honour of John Butt. Londres: Methuen & Co.
- Dyson, A.E (1970). "Dombey & Son: cobwebs to sunlight". The Inimitable Dickens. New York: St. Martin's Press.
- Arac, Jonathan (1978). "The House and the Railroad: Dombey & Son and The House of the Seven Gables". New England Quarterly. Vol. 51. pp. 3–22.
- Pothet, Lucien (1979). Mythe et tradition populaire dans l'univers dickensien (in French). Paris: Lettres Modernes. ISBN 2-256-90787-2.
- Stone, Harry (1979). Dickens and the Invisible World: Fairy Tales, Fantasy and Novel-Making. Vol. XII. Bloomington/Londres: Indiana University Press. p. 370.
- Page, Norman (1984). A Dickens Companion. New York: Schocken Books.
- Ferrieux, Robert (1991). Dombey and Son (in English and French). Perpignan: Université de Perpignan Via Domitia.
- Gondebeaud, Louis (1991). Dombey and Son (in English and French). Pau: Université de Pau et des Pays de l'Adour.
- Chassagnol, Anne (2010). La remaissance féerique à l'ère victorienne (in English and French). Bern: Peter Lang. ISBN 978-303911-757-4.
- Paroissien, David (2011). A Companion to Charles Dickens. Chichester: Wiley Blackwell. p. 515. ISBN 978-0-470-65794-2.
- Gilmour, Michael (2013). Animal Imagery in Charles Dickens's Dombey and Son. Providence, Canada: Providence University College.
