= Dombey and Son (1983 TV series) =

1983 UK television TV series

- Genre: Drama
- Based on: Dombey and Son by Charles Dickens
- Written by: James Andrew Hall
- Directed by: Rodney Bennett
- Starring: Julian Glover; Shirley Cain; Zelah Clarke; Kenton Moore
- Composer: Dudley Simpson
- No. of seasons: 1
- No. of episodes: 10

Production
- Producer: Barry Letts
- Editor: Ian Farr

Original release
- Release: January 16 – March 20, 1983

Dombey and Son is a British TV series in ten parts produced by the BBC and first broadcast in 1983. It was based on the 1848 novel Dombey and Son by Charles Dickens.

It was adapted by James Andrew Hall and directed by Rodney Bennett.

== Cast ==
- Julian Glover - Paul Dombey Sr
- Shirley Cain - Miss Tox
- Zelah Clarke - Susan Nipper
- Kenton Moore - Towlinson
- Lysette Anthony - Florence Dombey
- Rhoda Lewis - Louisa Chick
- Paul Darrow - Mr Carker
- Roger Milner - Solomon Gills
- Emrys James - Captain Cuttle
- Ronald Herdman - Perch
- Sharon Maughan - Edith Granger (later Dombey)
- Ivor Roberts - Mr Chick
- James Cossins - Major Bagstock
- Jenny McCracken - Polly Toodle (Mrs Richards)
- Steve Fletcher - Biler (Rob Toodle)
- Neal Swettenham - Mr Toots
- Max Gold - Walter Gay
- Barbara Hicks - Mrs Pipchin
- Paul Imbusch - Dr. Parker Peps
- Barnaby Buik - Paul Dombey Jr
- Romyanna Wood - Florence Dombey (younger)
- Diana King - Hon Mrs Skewton
- Andrew Dunford - Withers
- Anthony Dutton - Mr Toodle
