= Jane Eyre (1983 TV serial) =

- Based on: Jane Eyre by Charlotte Brontë
- Written by: Alexander Baron
- Directed by: Julian Amyes
- Starring: Zelah Clarke; Timothy Dalton
- Music by: Paul Reade
- Original languages: English; French
- No. of episodes: 11

Production
- Producer: Barry Letts
- Editors: Ian Collins; Oliver White
- Running time: 239 minutes

Original release
- Network: BBC1
- Release: 9 October – 18 December 1983

Jane Eyre is a 1983 British television serial adaptation of Charlotte Brontë's 1847 novel of the same name, produced by BBC and directed by Julian Amyes. The serial stars Zelah Clarke as the title character, and Timothy Dalton as Edward Rochester. It was originally broadcast in eleven 30 minute weekly episodes. Deene Park, located near Corby, Northamptonshire was used as the setting of Rochester's Thornfield Hall.

== Cast ==
- Zelah Clarke as Jane Eyre
- Timothy Dalton as Edward Rochester
- Jean Harvey as Mrs. Fairfax
- Blanche Youinou as Adele
- Damien Thomas as Richard Mason
- Carol Gillies as Grace Poole
- Joolia Cappleman as Bertha
- Mary Tamm as Blanche Ingram
- Andrew Bicknell as St. John Rivers
- Elaine Donnelly as Diana Rivers
- Morag Hood as Mary Rivers
- Colette Barker as Helen Burns
- Sian Pattenden as young Jane Eyre
- Judy Cornwell as Mrs. Reed
- Alan Cox as John Reed
- Emma Jacobs as Eliza Reed
- Gemma Walker as young Georgiana Reed
- Katharine Irwin as young Eliza Reed
- Robert James as Mr. Brocklehurst
- Kate David as Bessie
- Dorothea Phillips as Lady Lynn
