= Henry Towneley Green =

British painter

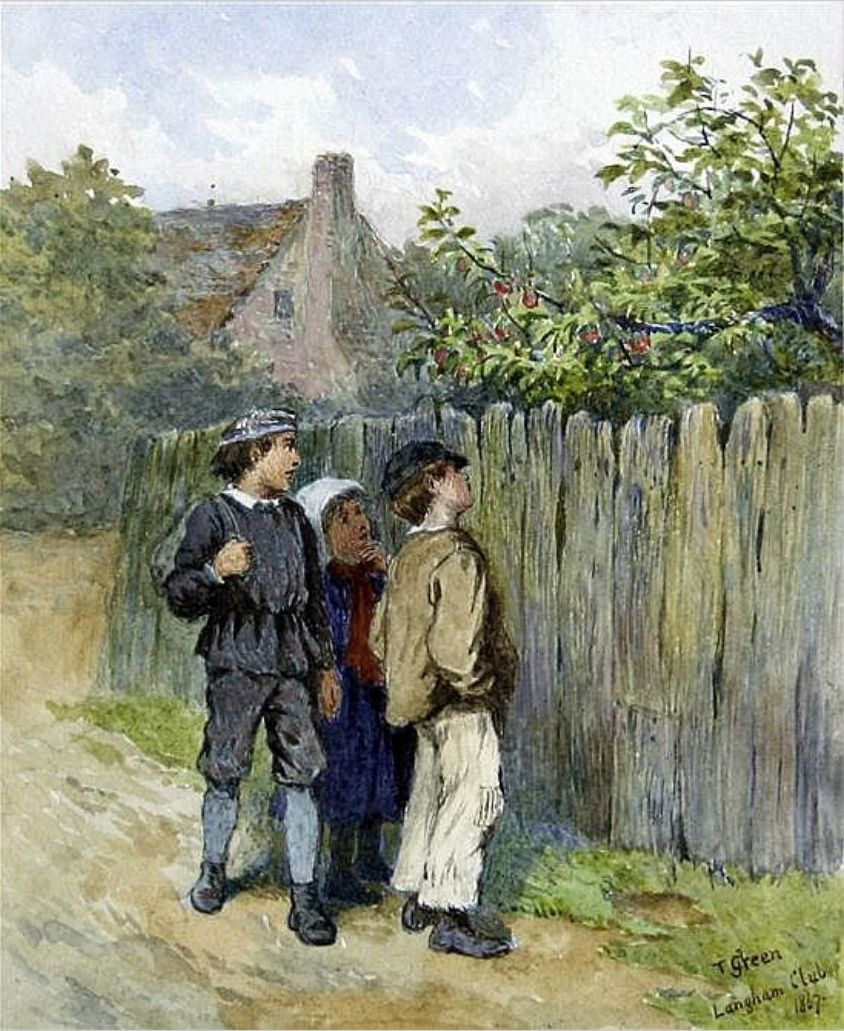
"Scrumpers" (1867)

Henry Towneley Green R.I. (1836–1899) was a British watercolourist and illustrator who exhibited from 1855 at the Royal Academy and the New Society of Painters in Watercolours. He became a member of the New Watercolour Society in 1879. He was the brother of Charles Green R.I. (1840–1898), a leading illustrator for The Graphic. The two brothers produced illustrations for Once a Week, and the Cornhill Magazine, edited by Thackeray, and regular contributed to by Millais and Leighton. Some of Green's work is held at the Victoria and Albert Museum.
