= Shirley Cain =

British actress (born 1935)

- Born: Shirley Roberts; 30 April 1935 (age 90); West Midlands, England
- Occupation: Actress
- Years active: 1956–1994
- Height: 1.64 m (5 ft 5 in)

Shirley Cain (born Shirley Roberts; 30 April 1935) is a British actress of film and television. She graduated from RADA in 1954. Cain was married to television executive John Cain until his death, on 12 April 2013, at the age of 88.

== Filmography ==
Films
Year	Title	Role	Note
1986	Harem	Embassy Hostess	
1982	The Last Visitor	Evalie Hobson	
1971	Villain	Mrs. Matthews	Supporting
1962	Son of the House	Judith	
1961	Return of a Stranger	Dorothy	
1960	An Honourable Murder		
1957	Wishing Well	Irene Jennings	
1956	Plaintiff in a Pretty Hat	Lady Susan Creel	

Television
Year	Title	Role	Note
1994	Ruth Rendell Mysteries	Doctor's Receptionist	Episode: Vanity Dies Hard: Part 1
1992	Crime Story	Johanna van Haarlem	Episode: A Question of Identity
1991	The Darling Buds of May	Mrs. Hall	Episodes: When the Green Woods Laugh: Part 1, The Darling Buds of May: Part 2
1991	EastEnders	Mrs. Collins	Episode 1.631
1990	Stolen	Miss. Brasher	Episode 1.3
1989	Victoria Wood	Marge	Episode: Over to Pam
1984–1989	The Bill	Mrs. Viggers / Mrs. Taylor	Episode: Duplicates, Long Odds
1988	Sophia and Constance	French saleswoman	Episode 1.3
1988	Tales of the Unexpected	Sister Wyman	Episode: The Surgeon
1987	A Dorothy L. Sayers Mystery	Miss. Climpson	Episode: Strong Poison: Episode One, Strong Poison: Episode Three
1985	Them and Us	Mrs. Morton	Episode: Caesar's Snarl
1985	Drummonds	Miss. Fenton	Episode: A Woman Lost and Found
1985	The Pickwick Papers	Miss. Whiterfield	Episode 1.6, 1.7
1984	Love and Marriage	Mrs. Murphy	Episode: A Matter of Will
1983	Dombey & Son	Miss. Tox	
1982	Jackanory	Sister Monica	
1981	Diamonds	Catherine Coleman	
1980–1981	Brendon Chase	Mrs. Bowers	
1980	God's Wonderful Railway	Jane Grant	
1980	Pride & Prejudice	Mrs. Phillips	Episode 1.2, 1.4
1979	Mistery!: Malice Aforethought	Miss. Peavy	
1979	Thomas and Sarah	Mrs. Hughes	Episode: Return to Gethym
1978	People Like Us	Edith Clegg	
1978	Rebecca of Sunnybrook Farm	Miss. Dearborn	
1977	Love for Lydia	Nurse Simpson	
1976	Crown Court	Dr. Joan Reedman	Episode: Operation Happiness: Part 1
1976	Victorian Scandals	Julia Starky	Episode: Beloved
1976	BBC2 Playhouse	Mrs. Nevinson	Episode: The Mind Beyond: Double Echo
1976	Warship	Edith	Episode: Fist Turn of the Screw
1975	North & South	Mrs. Hepworth	Episode 1.4
1975	Upstairs, Downstairs	Miss. Treadwell	
1975	Late Call	Renee Cranston	Episode 1.2
1975	Churchill's People	Alice	Episode: On the Anvil
1974	Seven Faces of Woman	Anne Kingdom	Episode: Cherryripe and the Lugworm Digger
1974	Thriller	Mrs. Terrill	Episode: Color Him Dead
1973	Murder Must Advertise	Miss Rossiter	
1972	New Scotland Yard	Mary Tyrell	Episode: Point of Impact
1965, 1971	Out of the Unknown	Frances Mervyn / Miss Clements	
1970	Man at the Top	Lottie Dromgan	
1970	Play for Today	Lady Emma Brenton	Episode: The Lie
1969	Not in Front of the Children	Hilary	
1969	ITV Playhouse	Miss Kindle	
1965–1967	ITV Play of the Week	Kath / Herby	Episodes: Top of the Ladder, The Fall of the Sparrow
1967	The Gamblers	Miss Pinock	Episode: My Dear Sirs
1967	Boy Meets Girl	Khaddouj	Episode: Love with a Few Harris
1967	Great Expectations	Mrs. Gargery	
1966	Blackmail	Manuela Moot	
1966	The Rat Catchers	Nancy Dowdeswell	Episode: Showdown Vienna
1966	Our Man at St.Mark's	Mary Dexter	Episode: Are You There?
1960–1966	No Hiding Place	Susan Parson / Janet Grantley	
1966	The Idiot	Varvara	Episode: The Prince's Return
1965	Ways with Words		
1964	You and the World	Brenda	Episode: Off to Work
1962–1963	Compact	Vendeuse / Fashion expert	
1963	Maigret	Jeanne Vernoux	Episode: The Fontenay Murders
1963	First Night	Denise	Episode: The Intitation
1963	The Desperate People	Claire Seldon	
1963	It Happened Like This	Miss Turner	Episode: The Hidden Witness
1961	BBC Sunday-Night Party	Madge	Episode: Marriage Lines
1958–1960	Saturday Playhouse	Betty Bryan / Susan Lashwood	
1960	A Matter of Degree	Rosamund	
1959	The Vise	Carol	Episode: Dilemma for Harry
1959	ITV Television Playhouse	Valerie	
1958–1959	BBC Sunday-Night Theatre	Ellen Ford / Beryl	Episodes: The Driving Force, The Uninvited
