= Dombey, West Virginia =

Unincorporated community in West Virginia, United States

Dombey
- Unincorporated community
- Location within the state of West Virginia Dombey (the United States)
- Coordinates: 39°12′15″N 81°37′19″W
- Country: United States
- State: West Virginia
- County: Wood
- Elevation: 771 ft (235 m)
- Time zone: UTC-5 (Eastern (EST))
  - Summer (DST): UTC-4 (EDT)
- GNIS ID: 1560375

Dombey was an unincorporated community in Wood County, West Virginia, United States.

The name is perhaps derived from the novel Dombey and Son by Charles Dickens.
