= Julian Amyes =

British film director (1917–1992)

Julian Charles Becket Amyes (9 August 1917 – 26 April 1992), was a British film and television director and producer.

Although primarily director and producer, Amyes also had acting roles in High Treason (1951) and Mandy (1952).

Amyes made his directorial début with a BBC Sunday Night Theatre version of Shakespeare's The Merry Wives of Windsor in 1952 and also directed a number of other productions for BBC before joining Granada Television in the early 1960s, where he was head of drama from 1963 until 1977.

Film credits (as director) include A Hill in Korea (1956), and the Emeric Pressburger-written Miracle in Soho (1957).

After 1977, he returned to directing predominantly in television directing (amongst other works) adaptations of The Old Curiosity Shop (1979), Great Expectations (1981) and Jane Eyre (1983) for the BBC. Amyes also worked on a number of independent productions, before acting as director on episodes of The Bill (1990) and Rumpole of the Bailey (1989–91) for Thames Television.

He was married to the actress/writer Anne Allan. They had two children; Sebastian a Professor at the University of Edinburgh and Isabelle, an actress. Julian Amyes died of a stroke in 1992.

== Selected filmography ==
Director

- A Hill in Korea (1956)
- Miracle in Soho (1957)
