= John Pilgrim =

Anglican Archdeacon of Antigua (1936–1941)

John Frere Pilgrim was an Anglican Archdeacon of Antigua from 1936 until his death on 1 March 1941.

Pilgrim was educated at Codrington College and was ordained in 1913. After a curacy at Saint Croix he held incumbencies in Saint Kitts, the Virgin Islands, and Nevis.
