= Charles Green (painter) =

English painter

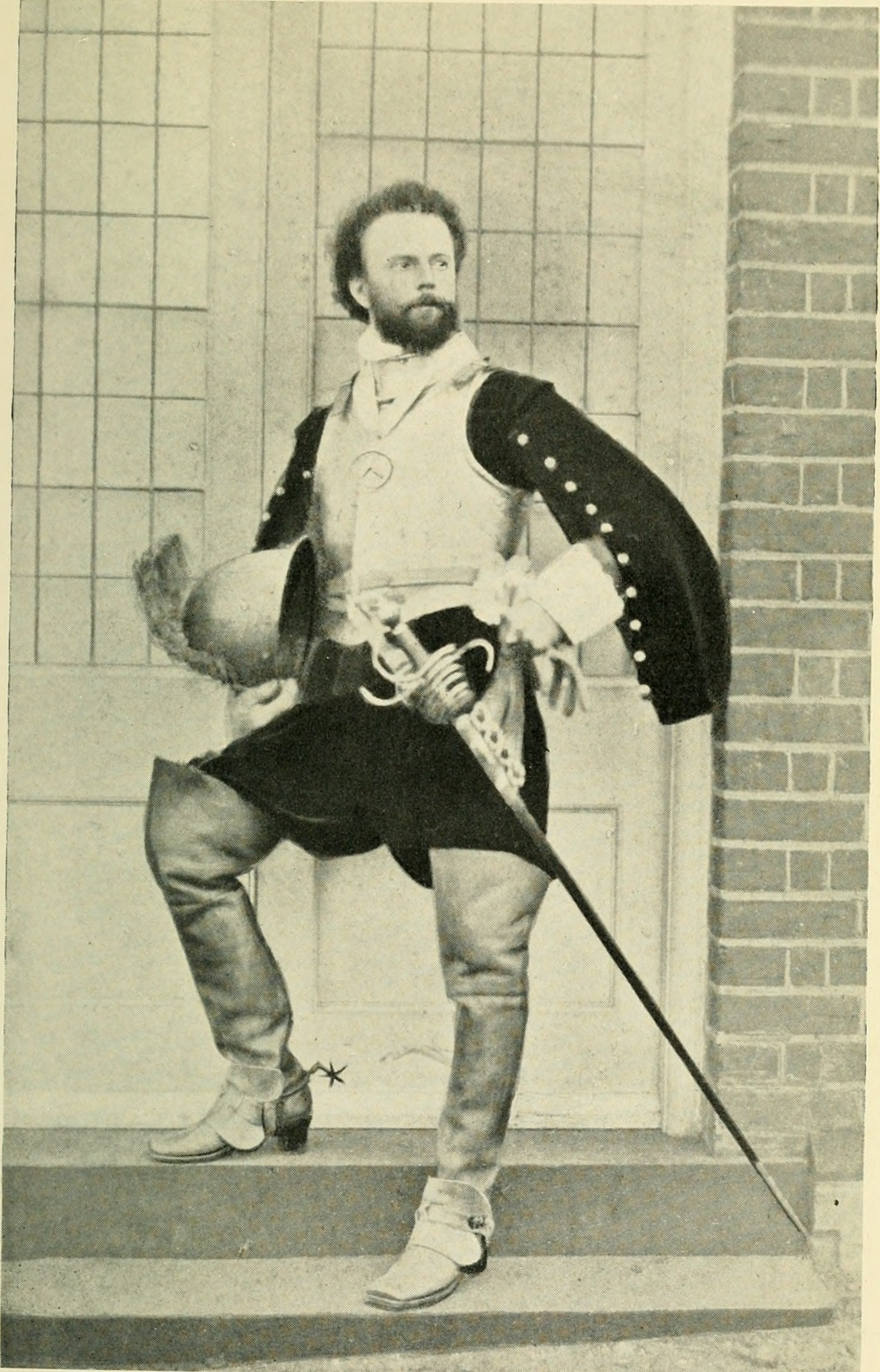
CHARLES GREEN, R.I. in fancy dress (From a private photograph.)

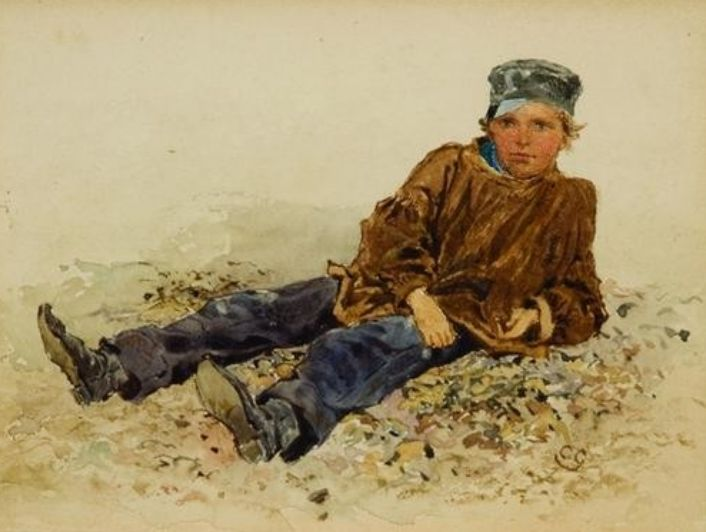
'Breaker boy'

Charles Green R.I. (1840–1898), was a British watercolourist and illustrator. He was the brother of Towneley Green R.I. (1836–1899).
