= A Hill in Korea =

1956 British war film

- Original American film poster
- Directed by: Julian Amyes
- Written by: Anthony Squire; Ian Dalrymple
- Based on: novel by Max Catto
- Produced by: Anthony Squire
- Starring: George Baker; Harry Andrews; Stanley Baker
- Cinematography: Freddie Francis
- Edited by: Peter R. Hunt
- Music by: Malcolm Arnold
- Production company: Wessex Films
- Distributed by: British Lion Films
- Release dates: 2 September 1956 (Edinburgh Film Festival): 18 September 1956 (London)
- Running time: 81 minutes
- Country: United Kingdom
- Language: English

A Hill in Korea is a 1956 British war film based on Max Catto's 1953 novel of the same name. The original name was Hell in Korea, but it was changed for distribution reasons—except in the US. It was directed by Julian Amyes and produced by Anthony Squire. Incidental music was written by Malcolm Arnold.

It was the first major feature film to portray British troops in action during the Korean War and introduces Michael Caine (himself a veteran of the Korean War) in his first credited film role. There are also early screen appearances by Stanley Baker, Robert Shaw and Ronald Lewis. The movie was also the first cinematographer credit for Freddie Francis.

== Plot ==
During the Korean War in 1951, a small force of British soldiers is in danger of being cut off by the advancing Chinese army. The plot emphasizes the plight of the National Servicemen who, as they say, were "old enough to fight, but too young to vote."

The film also depicts a "Friendly-fire" incident, in which the British are bombed by the Americans. (refer to Friendly-fire incident in the Battle of Hill 282)

The film opens in Korea with a British Army patrol, led by Lt. Butler. In the patrol is tough veteran Sergeant Payne, a slightly psychotic Corporal Ryker, and the cowardly signaller Wyatt. As they search a small village, one of the party falls victim to a bomb planted in a small shack. With the death of one of his men, Butler moves the patrol out of the village. Out in the open plain, Butler and Payne discover a large force of Chinese soldiers heading directly for them. Sending Payne and the patrol back towards their own lines, Butler and three of his men stay behind to cover the withdrawal. After fending off two attacks, Butler discovers Lance Corporal Hodge is dead. Payne returns with the patrol, informing Butler that they were cut off by other enemy forces.

The patrol heads through the village and up a winding path towards an isolated temple located on a hill, with only a steep cliff to its rear. On the way, Wyatt throws away the only radio because he cannot be bothered to carry it up the hill. Then they run into an enemy patrol on the path. They ambush the Chinese, and continue up to the temple. With the Chinese knowing now exactly where they are, Butler must keep his troops together, and fend off the enemy attacks.

== Cast ==
- George Baker as Lieutenant Butler
- Harry Andrews as Sergeant Payne
- Stanley Baker as Corporal Ryker
- Michael Medwin as Private Docker
- Ronald Lewis as Private Wyatt
- Stephen Boyd as Private Sims
- Victor Maddern as Private Lindop
- Harry Landis as Private Rabin
- Robert Brown as Private O'Brien
- Barry Lowe as Private Neill
- Robert Shaw as Lance Corporal Hodge
- Charles Laurence as Private Kim
- Percy Herbert as Private Moon
- Eric Corrie as Private Matthews
- David Morrell as Private Henson
- Michael Caine as Private Lockyer

== Production ==
The film was based on a novel by Max Catto which was published in 1954 and based on true events. Film rights were optioned by Ian Dalrymple's company, Wessex Productions. Dalrymple borrowed George Baker from Associated British to play the lead. Juliam Aymes took leave from the BBC to direct the film.

Robert Shaw said "I had quite a nice part, that of a simple country boy." The cast also included Stanley Baker.

The film was shot on location in Portugal from September to November 1955, followed by studio work at Shepperton Studios in London. Baker recalled in his memoirs, "It was cheaper to keep us all there [in Portugal] rather than pay air fares back and forth to England. The actual location was miserable; miles from anywhere, in the middle of sand dunes. The heat by midday was almost unbearable. We were based in Lisbon and had a two-hour drive to work every morning and, of course, two hours home at night."

Michael Caine was cast in part because of his experience in the Korean War, where he had served as a soldier. He later said, "My function as a technical advisor was completely ignored during the making of the film. For example, I advised the crew to spread the troops wide as the latter advanced, which was militarily correct, but they replied that they didn't have a lens of sufficient width to take it all in! I also pointed out that the officer would have removed his signs of rank and worn a hat, the same as the other men, to disguise which one was in command, but George [Baker] was allowed to go into battle with all badges and hat gleaming, every inch an officer. In a real fight, he would never have lasted all of ten seconds." Caine was paid £800 for his work in the film.

Caine added, "The most glaring mistake that I never brought to their notice was that Portugal did not in the least resemble Korea; if anything, Wales was more similar. I did not say anything because I wanted to stay in Portugal – I could go to Wales at any old time." Caine later recalled, "I had eight lines in that picture, and I screwed up six of them."

== Release ==
According to Caine, "the company held on to the film for ages before releasing it. After a year of waiting for the perfect moment, with true movie genius they premiered the film on the night that Suez invasion of 1956.

The film debuted at the Edinburgh Film Festival on 2 September 1956, over a month before the invasion of Suez. The Daily Telegraph argued "the characters, though not particularly original or drawn at any great depth, are sketched in sufficiently to arouse interest." The movie was released in London cinemas on 20 September 1956 with the premiere attended by Gerald Templer.

George Baker recalled in his memoirs that the film's release "coincided with a national newspaper strike and, although Dilys Powell put it in her top ten films for 1958 at the end of the year, we didn't get a single review at the time of its release."

Contrary to Baker's statement there were some reviews when the film came out. The Evening Standard felt it had familiar plot and characters but "Julian Aymes manages to get his camera closer to the real men than most and reveals the human beings beneath the dirt and the khaki." The Daily Herald felt it was "an exciting film with good acting." The Daily Mirror said the film "hit the spot". Variety called it "well made".

Michael Caine commented, "The picture went straight down the pan, and my movie career along with it. I bemoaned the fact that nobody had seen the film, until I actually saw it myself. I was terrible! My voice was awful...My eyelashes are blond and so are my eyebrows, which has the effect in close-up of something speaking that hasn't got a face, and it's not much better in medium shot..My appearances were mercifully few, the editor having decided that the cutting-room floor was the ideal place for my first effort at international stardom."

Linsday Anderson later wrote that the movie:

Is far from being a realistic film about modern war. It is not about its futility; and it says nothing very convincing about courage. It is not about why we were right to send these men to fight in Korea, and it is not about why we might have been wrong, either. Presented with a certain, ineffective good taste, it is a pointless reworking of stale conventions: the isolated patrol, the inexperienced lieutenant, the fatherly sergeant, the coward — and, of course, the inevitable chorus of indomitable Cockney wit. The Bren guns blaze away; the British infantrymen grit their teeth in close-up; the Chink Commies are mown down. 'Honest,' as one of the characters remarks, 'it binds you rigid.'

The film was released in the US in late 1957. The Los Angeles Times called it "taut, no-nonsense".

== Legacy ==
Caine said his performance in the film led to his agent firing him. However director Julian Aymes later cast Caine in a small role in a TV play The Lark.
