= Sydney Streeter =

British film production manager

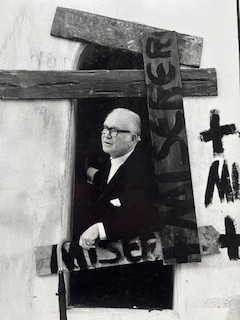
- Born: December 12, 1910; Falmouth, Cornwall, England.
- Died: December 4, 1989 (aged 78); Harrow, Middlesex, England.
- Occupations: Production manager, producer, assistant director.
- Years active: 1928 – 1978
- Spouse: Ivy Maud Hood b.1916-d.1974. (m. 1940).
- Children: Susan April

Sydney Stanley Stephen Streeter (12 December 1910 – 4 December 1989) was a British film production manager, recognised for his contributions to mid-20th-century cinema.

He is best known for his work with legendary filmmakers Michael Powell and Emeric Pressburger on critically acclaimed films such as Black Narcissus (1947), The Red Shoes (1948) and Battle of the River Plate (1956).

He contributed to more than forty films, working as a producer, associate producer, production manager, and assistant director, helping to ensure the success of films such as In Which We Serve (1942), Ill Met by Moonlight (1957), and The Tales of Hoffmann (1951).

Five of the films on which he worked were included in the British Film Institute's list of the Top 100 British films, with The Red Shoes ranking in the top 10.

== Early life ==
Sydney Stanley Stephen Streeter was born in Falmouth, Cornwall, to William John Streeter, a mariner serving on a Mission boat, and Elizabeth Graham Pascoe.

Streeter's father died when he was only three. His mother later married William's brother Charles, a boat designer and builder. The family then moved from Cornwall to Middlesex, where Streeter received his education.

During World War II, Streeter served in the Royal Air Force as a Leading Aircraftman in the Administrative and Special Duties Branch, where he assisted the RAF Film Unit in producing wartime propaganda films.

== Film career ==
Streeter first gained recognition at the age of twenty-six when he caught the attention of director Michael Powell while working at Rock Studios, Elstree. At the time, Powell was putting together a cast and crew who were willing to take part in an expedition to make The Edge of the World, a film to be shot on the remote Scottish island of Foula. As he recalls in his autobiography, "Syd Streeter, whom I had noticed as an exceptional man as stage carpenter at Rock Studios, was to be Chief of Construction."

With a small team of just twenty-three actors and crew, an advance party—comprising director Michael Powell, Streeter, editor John Seabourne, and Alasdair Holbourn, who granted permission for filming—set out on a six-hour sea journey in a half-decked boat to establish the project on the island. The entire cast and crew would spend the next five months living and working together in this harsh, remote environment, bringing the story of the islands' depopulation to life on film. This was to be the start of both a professional and personal relationship with Michael Powell that was to last over fifty years.

Streeter was to soon work again with Michael Powell in 1941, as Associate Art Director on the Oscar-nominated 49th Parallel. This was the first film produced by Powell and Emeric Pressburger through their production company, The Archers. The film was backed by the British Ministry of Information during World War II as propaganda to encourage the neutral United States to join the Allied war effort. Praised as "the war's best film," its production spanned thirteen months and involved the team traveling over 20,000 miles, including two round trips to Canada.

After serving as Unit Manager on One of Our Aircraft Is Missing (1942), Streeter's expertise and comprehensive understanding of filmmaking once again caught Powell's attention. Impressed by his abilities, Powell promoted him to production manager, entrusting him with the responsibility of overseeing entire productions. Reflecting on the decision, Michael Powell later remarked, "He knew all the answers, so I made him production manager. With us, a production manager title meant that you managed the whole production, and Syd took this all in his stride."

It was as Production Manager that Streeter worked for the first time with the Director David Lean who co-directed In Which We Serve in 1942 with Noel Coward. The film was nominated for two Oscars (best picture and best original screenplay).

Streeter's next films with The Archers were The Life and Death of Colonel Blimp working as Production Manager (uncredited) in 1943, followed by The Volunteer in 1944, for which he was Production Supervisor. He then returned to work with David Lean as Unit Manager in the making of Blithe Spirit, released in 1945.

These productions were followed by the landmark film Black Narcissus (released in 1947), one of Powell and Pressburger's most acclaimed masterpieces. Sydney Streeter, recently discharged from the Royal Air Force, served as Assistant Director, while Jack Cardiff provided the film's stunning cinematography, for which he was awarded an Oscar.

Despite being filmed almost entirely in a studio, the Himalayan setting was convincingly recreated, showcasing the production's technical brilliance. Black Narcissus has come to be regarded as a classic of British cinema which won the Academy Award for Best Art Direction.

Streeter's work the following year as assistant director on The Red Shoes (1948) for directors Powell and Pressburger contributed to one of the most visually striking films of its era, earning critical acclaim and an Oscar nomination for Best Picture. Based on Hans Christian Andersen's fairy tale of the same name, it has become a cult classic and is frequently cited as one of the best British films ever made.

Streeter continued working with Powell and Pressburger, including as Assistant Director on The Tales of Hoffmann (1951) and Assistant Producer on Battle of the River Plate (1956), for which The Archers saw him as their 'ambassador' to Uruguay. There, he laid the groundwork for ten days of filming in Montevideo, mobilising the government, police, and army. He also arranged for 10,000 civilians to serve as extras, to be filmed watching the drama of the final hours of the German battleship, the Graf Spee.

Between shooting these films, Streeter accompanied Michael Powell, Emeric Pressburger and art director Hein Heckroth on a visit to Israel in 1953, to research a proposed film based on the memoirs of Chaim Weizmann, the country's first president. Though the film was never made, their 16mm location footage survives as Salt of the Earth (Research Footage), reflecting the Archers' ambition to explore new stories and settings.

Streeter's next and final film with The Archers was Ill Met by Moonlight (1957), after which Powell and Pressburger ended their Archers partnership.

Streeter remained in demand as a Production Manager and continued to work on a further 21 films, with Directors including Stanley Donan, Richard Attenborough, Guy Hamilton, George Pollock and Michael Anderson (see Filmography).

In 1978, Streeter resumed his work as a Producer, working once again with Michael Powell on Return to The Edge of the World for BBC television, revisiting the island of Foula with members of the original cast and crew. In this sense, his career had come full circle, making it a fitting end to his work in filmmaking.

== Personal life ==
Streeter married Ivy Maud Hood in 1940. The couple lived in Harrow Weald, Middlesex, and had one daughter, Susan April, a professional photographer. Sydney Streeter died on 4 December 1989, in Harrow, Middlesex.

Sydney and Ivy became close friends with Michael Powell, often hosting him in Harrow or joining him at his hotel, La Voile D'Or, in St-Jean-Cap-Ferrat, touring the Côte d'Azur in his renowned open Bentley.

Streeter's brother, John Brian Streeter (1925 – 2012), also pursued a career in the film industry as a sound recordist, running a sound studio for MGM, Elstree. The two collaborated on only one film, A Touch of Larceny (1960), which was filmed on the Isle of Mull, Scotland. The film received an Academy Award nomination for Best Writing, Story, and Screenplay.

== Legacy ==
Streeter became widely regarded within the film industry as the "Gentleman of British films". His contribution to British cinema, particularly through his work with Michael Powell and Emeric Pressburger, lives on in films that remain celebrated as milestones in cinematic history. Five of the films on which he worked, two as Assistant Director and three as Production Manager, are listed in the British Film Institute's 100 greatest British films of the 20th century.

== Filmography ==
The following table details Streeter's filmography, highlighting his various roles and the years of release:

Year	Name of Film	Role	Director(s)	Notes and selected nominations
1937	The Edge of the World	Chief of Construction/Actor	Michael Powell	
1941	49th Parallel	Associate Art Director	Michael Powell, Emeric Pressburger	Oscar nomination for Best Picture.
1942	Road to Morocco	Unit Manager (uncredited)	David Butler	
1942	One of Our Aircraft Is Missing	Unit Manager	Michael Powell, Emeric Pressburger	
1942	In Which We Serve	Production Manager	Noël Coward, David Lean	* Ranked 92nd ^{h} in top 100. Oscar nomination for Best Picture and best original screenplay.
1943	The Life and Death of Colonel Blimp	Production Manager (uncredited)	Michael Powell, Emeric Pressburger	* Ranked 45th in top 100.
1944	The Volunteer	Production Supervisor	Michael Powell, Emeric Pressburger	
1945	Blithe Spirit	Unit Manager	David Lean	
1947	Black Narcissus	Assistant Director	Michael Powell, Emeric Pressburger	* Ranked 44th in top 100. Oscar Winner Best Cinematography, Colour. Oscar Winner Best Art Direction-Set Decoration, Colour. Winner Golden Globe Best Cinematography.
1948	The Red Shoes	Assistant Director	Michael Powell, Emeric Pressburger	* Ranked 9th in top 100. Oscar nomination for Best Picture.
1950	Gone to Earth	Assistant Director	Michael Powell, Emeric Pressburger	
1951	The Tales of Hoffmann	Assistant Director	Michael Powell, Emeric Pressburger	
1952	Folly to Be Wise	Assistant Director	Frank Launder	
1953	The Captain's Paradise	Production Manager	Anthony Kimmins	
1954	The Belles of St. Trinian's	Production Manager	Frank Launder	* Ranked 94th in top 100.
1955	Contraband Spain	Production Manager	Lawrence Huntington	
1955	Oh... Rosalinda!!	Associate Producer	Michael Powell, Emeric Pressburger	
1956	The Battle of the River Plate	Associate Producer	Michael Powell, Emeric Pressburger	BAFTA Award nomination for Best British Screenplay. Chosen for Royal Film Performance.
1957	Miracle in Soho	Associate Producer	Julian Amyes	
1957	Ill Met by Moonlight	Associate Producer	Michael Powell, Emeric Pressburger	
1958	Indiscreet	Associate Producer	Stanley Donen	Nominated for three Golden Globes and three BAFTAS
1959	Honeymoon	Production Associate	Michael Powell	
1960	A Touch of Larceny	Production Supervisor	Guy Hamilton	
1960	Surprise Package	Production Supervisor	Stanley Donen	
1961	The Queen's Guards	Associate Director	Michael Powell	
1962	The Password Is Courage	Associate Producer	Andrew L. Stone	
1963	Ladies Who Do	Production Manager	C.M. Pennington-Richards	
1963	Murder at the Gallop	Production Manager	George Pollock	
1964	Murder Most Foul	Production Manager	George Pollock	
1964	Murder Ahoy	Production Manager	George Pollock	
1965	Operation Crossbow	Production Manager	Michael Anderson	
1965	Dr Zhivago	Uncredited production work	David Lean	Responsible for the snow scenes in Finland and Sweden.
1966	Eye of the Devil	Production Manager	J. Lee Thompson	
1966	The Quiller Memorandum	Production Supervisor	Michael Anderson	
1967	Pretty Polly	Associate Producer	Guy Green	
1969	Battle of Britain	Production Supervisor	Guy Hamilton	
1970	Toomorrow	Production Supervisor	Val Guest	
1970	No Blade of Grass	Production Supervisor	Cornel Wilde	
1972	Young Winston	Location Manager	Richard Attenborough	
1974	Sex Play	Production Supervisor	Jack Arnold	
1976	Knossos: The Lost Capital of Atlantis	Producer	Michael Powell	
1978	Return to the Edge of the World	Co-Producer	Michael Powell	
