= Dombey and Son =

1846–1848 novel by Charles Dickens

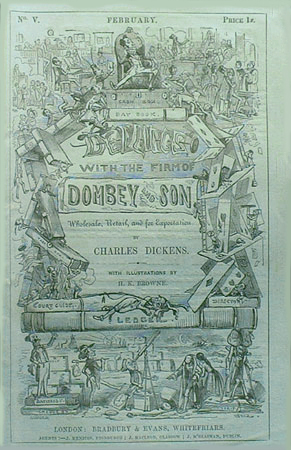
- Cover of serial edition, fifth instalment, February 1847
- Author: Charles Dickens
- Original title: Dealings with the Firm of Dombey and Son: Wholesale, Retail and for Exportation
- Illustrator: Hablot Knight Browne (Phiz)
- Language: English
- Genre: Novel
- Published: Serial 1 October 1846 – 1 April 1848; Book 12 April 1848
- Publisher: Bradbury & Evans
- Publication place: England
- Media type: Print (Serial, Hardback, and Paperback)
- Preceded by: Martin Chuzzlewit
- Followed by: David Copperfield

Dombey and Son is a novel by English author Charles Dickens. It follows the fortunes of a shipping firm owner, who is frustrated at the lack of a son to follow him in his footsteps; he initially rejects his daughter's love before eventually becoming reconciled with her.

The story features many Dickensian themes, such as arranged marriages, child cruelty, betrayal, deceit, and relations between people from different British social classes. The novel was first published in monthly parts between 1846 and 1848, with illustrations by Hablot Knight Browne ("Phiz").

== Development ==
Dickens started writing the book in Lausanne, Switzerland, before returning to England, via Paris, to complete it.

The full title is Dealings with the Firm of Dombey and Son: Wholesale, Retail and for Exportation.

== Plot summary ==
The story concerns Paul Dombey, the wealthy owner of the shipping company of the book's title, whose dream is to have a son to continue his business. The book begins when his son is born and Dombey's wife dies shortly after giving birth. Following the advice of Mrs Louisa Chick, his sister, Dombey employs a wet nurse named Mrs Richards (Toodle). Dombey already has a six-year-old daughter, Florence, but, bitter at her not having been the desired boy, he neglects her; following her mother's death, her main source of love is her young attendant, Susan Nipper. About six months later, the two servants take their charges on an unauthorised visit to the home of Mrs Richards, so that she can see her children briefly. On the long walk home, Florence becomes separated from them and is kidnapped for a short time by Good Mrs Brown before being returned to the streets. She makes her way to Dombey and Son's offices in the City and there is found and brought home by Walter Gay, a junior employee of Mr Dombey, who first introduces her to his uncle and guardian, the navigation instrument maker Solomon Gills, at his shop, The Wooden Midshipman.

Dombey’s son, named Paul after his father, is a weak and sickly child who does not socialise normally with others; adults call him "old fashioned". He is intensely fond of his sister, Florence, who is deliberately neglected by her father as a supposedly irrelevant distraction. Paul is sent to the seaside at Brighton for his health, where he and Florence lodge with the ancient and acidic Mrs Pipchin. Finding his health beginning to improve there, Mr Dombey keeps him at Brighton and has him educated at Dr and Mrs Blimber's school, where he and the other boys undergo an intense and arduous education under the tutelage of Mr Feeder, B.A. and Cornelia Blimber. It is here that Paul is befriended by a much older fellow pupil, the amiable but weak-minded Mr Toots.

Here Paul's health declines even further in this "great hothouse" and he finally dies. Dombey pushes his daughter away from him after the death of his son while she futilely tries to earn his love. In the meantime young Walter is sent off to fill a junior position in the firm's counting house in Barbados through the manipulations of Mr Dombey's confidential manager, Mr James Carker, "with his white teeth", who sees him as a potential rival through his association with Florence. The ship, The Son and Heir, is reported lost; Walter is presumed drowned. Solomon Gills departs London in search of his nephew, leaving his great friend Captain Edward Cuttle in charge of The Wooden Midshipman. Meanwhile Florence is left alone with few friends to keep her company.

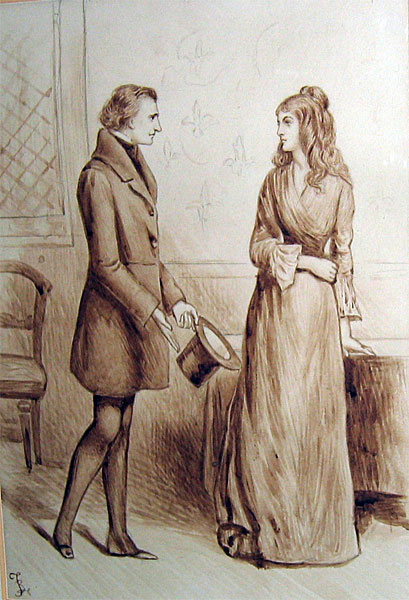
Illustration of Mr Carker and Edith Dombey by Charles Green

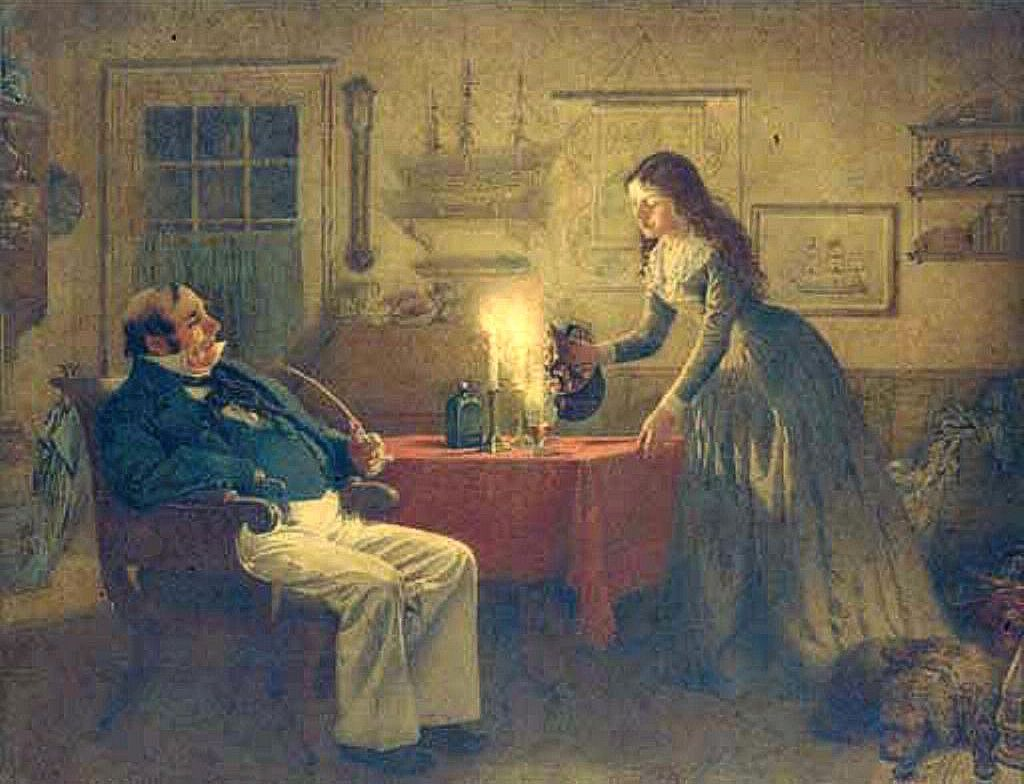
Illustration of Captain Cuttle and Florence Dombey by Charles Green

Dombey goes to Leamington Spa to improve his health with a new friend, Major Joseph Bagstock. The Major deliberately sets out to befriend Dombey to spite his neighbour, Miss Tox, who has turned cold towards him owing to her hopes – through her close friendship with Mrs Chick – of marrying Mr Dombey. At the spa, the Major introduces Dombey to Mrs Skewton and her widowed daughter, Mrs Edith Granger. Mr Dombey, on the lookout for a new wife since his son's death, considers Edith a suitable match owing to her accomplishments and family connections. She has beauty; he has money. He is encouraged by both the Major and Mrs Skewton, but obviously feels no affection for her, nor she for him. They return to London and marry. Dombey has effectively bought the haughty Edith, since she and her mother are in a poor financial state. The marriage is loveless; his wife despises Dombey for his overbearing pride and herself for being shallow and worthless. Her love for Florence initially prevents her from leaving but finally she conspires with Mr Carker to ruin Dombey's public image by running away together to France. They do so after yet another argument with Dombey in which he once again attempts to subdue her to his will. When he discovers that she has left him, he blames Florence for siding with her stepmother, striking her on the breast in his anger. Florence runs away from home. Distraught, she makes her way to The Wooden Midshipman, where she lodges with Captain Cuttle as he attempts to restore her to health. They are visited frequently by Mr Toots and his prizefighter companion, the Chicken, the former having been desperately in love with Florence since their time together in Brighton.

Dombey sets out to find his runaway wife. He is helped by Mrs Brown and her daughter, Alice, who, as it turns out, had been seduced and abandoned by Mr Carker when she was young. After being transported as a convict, for criminal activities in which Mr Carker had involved her, she returns to England, reunites with her mother, and determines to seek her revenge. Mrs Brown arranges for Dombey to overhear her conversation with Rob the Grinder – whom Mr Carker has employed as a spy – about the whereabouts of the pair who have absconded. Dombey, accompanied by Major Bagstock, sets off to France in pursuit. In the meantime, in Dijon, Mrs Dombey informs Carker that she sees him in no better a light than she sees Dombey and that she will not stay with him, and she flees their apartment. Distraught, with both his financial and personal hopes lost, Carker flees from his former employer's pursuit. He seeks refuge back in England, but while fleeing from a pursuing Dombey is struck by a train and killed.

Meanwhile, back at The Midshipman, Walter reappears, having been saved by a passing ship after floating adrift with two other sailors on some wreckage. After some time he and Florence are finally reunited – not as "brother and sister" but as lovers, and they marry prior to sailing for China on Walter's new ship. This is also the time when Sol Gills returns to The Midshipman. As he relates to his friends, he received news whilst in Barbados that a homeward-bound China trader had picked up Walter and so had returned to England immediately. He said he had sent letters whilst in the Caribbean to his friend Ned Cuttle c/o Mrs MacStinger at Cuttle's former lodgings, and the bemused Captain recounts how he fled the place and thus never received them.

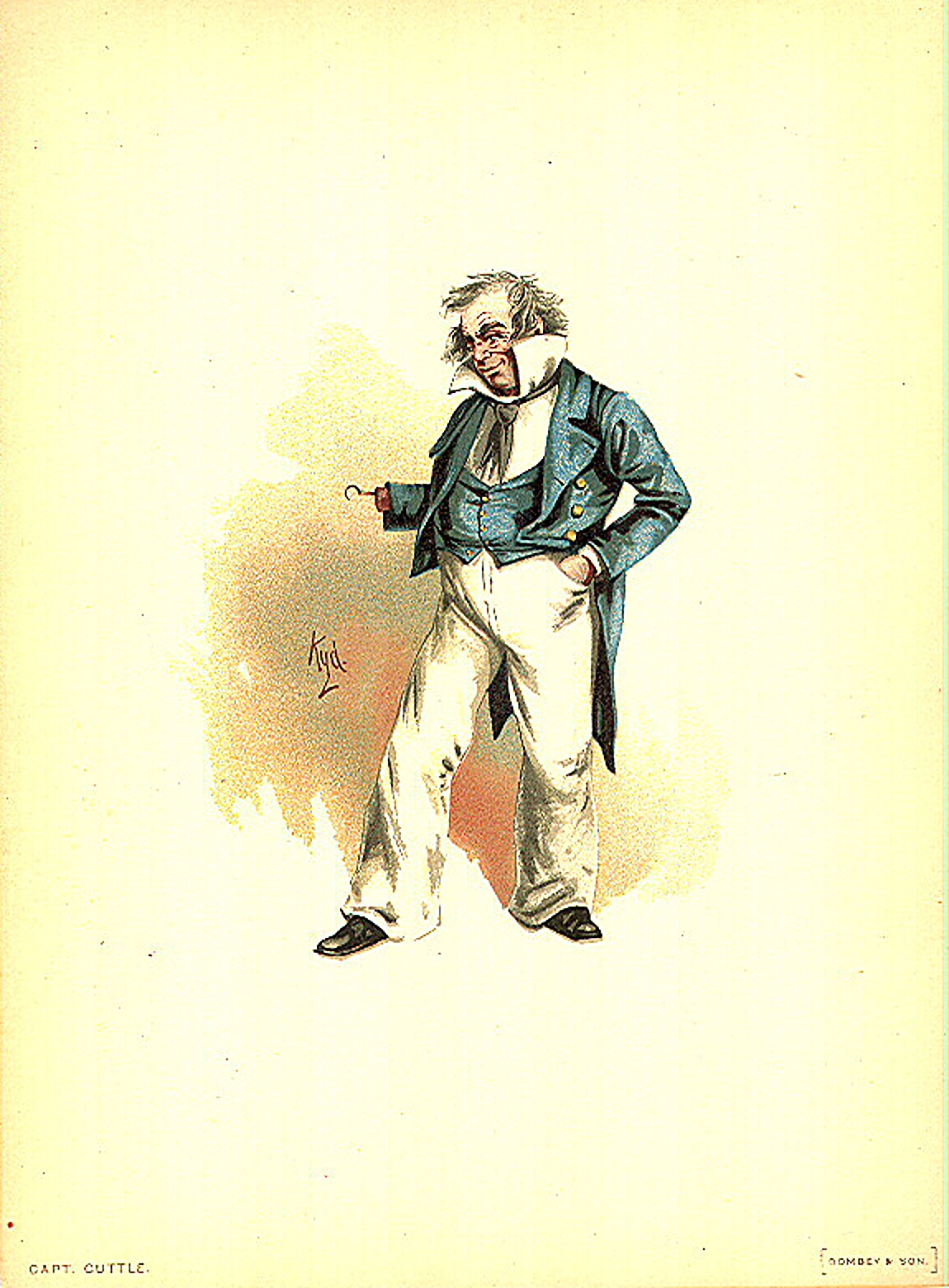
Captain Cuttle by "Kyd" (Joseph Clayton Clarke)

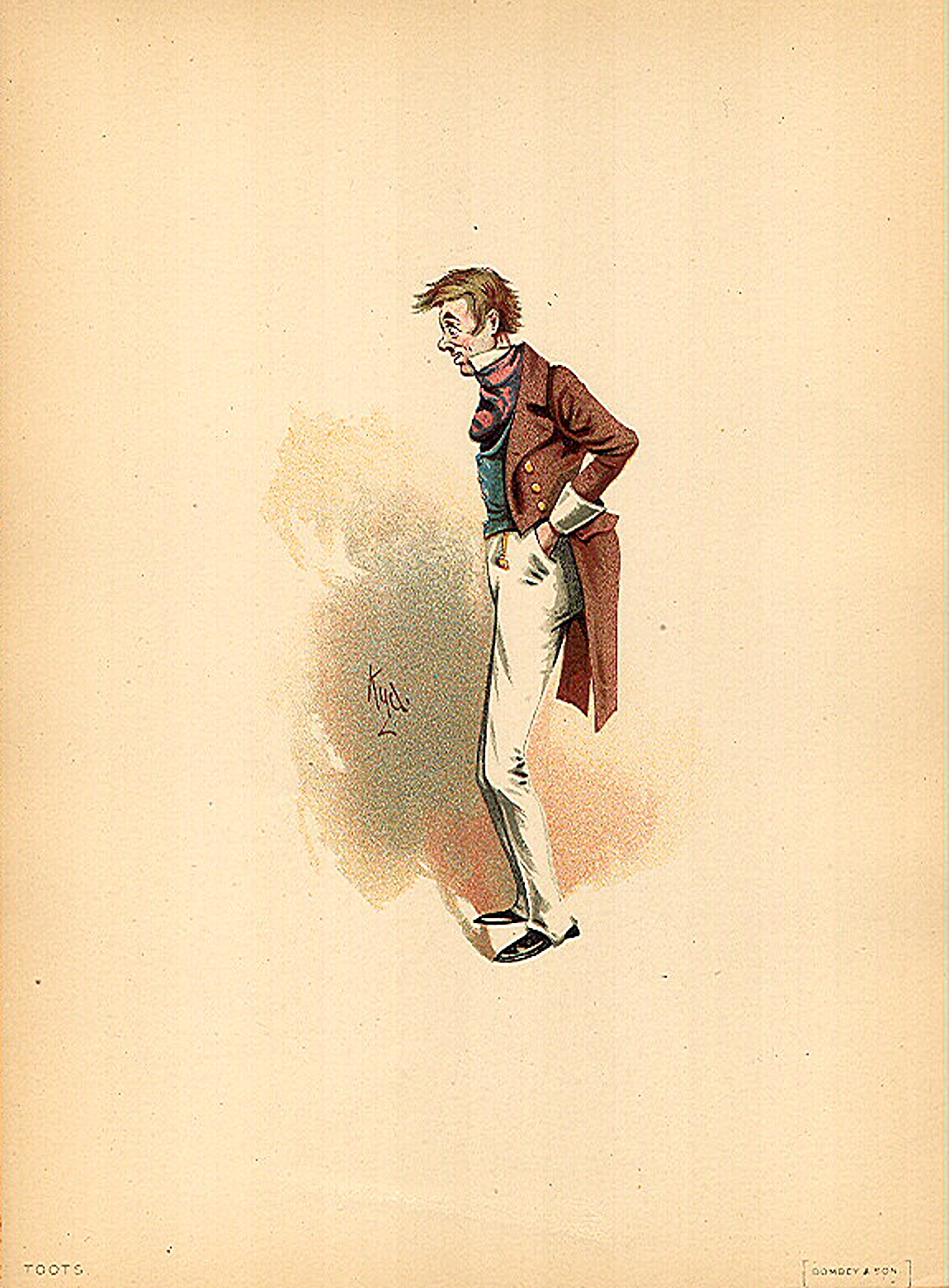
Toots by "Kyd" (Joseph Clayton Clarke)

After Carker's death it is discovered that he had been running the firm far beyond its means. This information is gleaned by Carker's brother and sister, John and Harriet, from Mr Morfin, the assistant manager at Dombey and Son, who sets out to help John Carker. He often overheard the conversations between the two brothers in which James, the younger, often abused John, the older, a clerk who early in his career abused his financial position at Dombey and Son but was retained by Dombey as an example and possibly because of his relationship to James Carker. It is unclear whether James worked at the firm at the time of John's downfall. As his nearest relatives John and Harriet inherit all Carker's ill-gotten gains, to which they feel they have no right. Consequently they surreptitiously give the proceeds to Mr Dombey through Mr Morfin, who is instructed to let Dombey believe they are merely something forgotten in the general wreck of his fortunes.

Florence and Walter depart and Sol Gills is entrusted with a letter, written by Walter to Florence’s father, pleading for him to be reconciled towards them both. A year passes and Alice Brown has slowly been dying despite the tender care of Harriet Carker. One night Alice's mother reveals that Alice herself is the illegitimate cousin of Edith Dombey (which accounts for their similarity in appearance when they meet). In a chapter entitled ‘Retribution’ Dombey and Son goes bankrupt. Dombey retires to two rooms in his house and all the house's contents are put up for sale. Mrs Pipchin, for some time the housekeeper, dismisses all the servants and returns to Brighton, to be replaced by Mrs Richards. Dombey spends his days sunk in gloom, seeing no-one and thinking only of his daughter:

He thought of her as she had been that night when he and his bride came home. He thought of her as she had been in all the home events of the abandoned house. He thought, now, that of all around him she alone had never changed. His boy had faded into dust, his proud wife had sunk into a polluted creature, his flatterer and friend had been transformed into the worst of villains, his riches had melted away, the very walls that sheltered him looked on him as a stranger; she alone had turned the same mild gentle look upon him always. Yes, to the latest and the last. She had never changed to him – nor had he ever changed to her – and she was lost.

However one day Florence returns to the house with her baby son, Paul, and is lovingly reunited with her father.

Dombey accompanies his daughter to her and Walter's house, where he slowly starts to decline, cared for by Florence and also Susan Nipper, now Mrs Toots. They receive a visit from Edith's cousin Feenix, who takes Florence to Edith for one final time: Feenix had sought Edith out in France and she had returned to England under his protection. Edith gives Florence a letter, asking Dombey to forgive her for her crime before her departure to the South of Italy with her elderly relative. As she says to Florence, "I will try, then, to forgive him his share of the blame. Let him try to forgive me mine!"

The final chapter (LXII) sees Dombey now a white-haired old man "whose face bears heavy marks of care and suffering; but they are traces of a storm that has passed on for ever, and left a clear evening in its track". Sol Gills and Ned Cuttle are now partners at The Midshipman, a source of great pride to the latter, and Mr and Mrs Toots announce the birth of their third daughter. Walter is doing well in business, having been appointed to a position of great confidence and trust, and Dombey is the proud grandfather of both a grandson and granddaughter, whom he dotes on. The book ends with the lines:

"Dear grandpapa, why do you cry when you kiss me?"

He only answers, "Little Florence! Little Florence!" and smooths away the curls that shade her earnest eyes.

The voices in the waves speak low to him of Florence, day and night—plainest when he, his blooming daughter, and her husband, beside them in the evening, or sit at an open window, listening to their roar. They speak to him of Florence and his altered heart; of Florence and their ceaseless murmuring to her of the love, eternal and illimitable, extending still, beyond the sea, beyond the sky, to the invisible country far away.

Never from the mighty sea may voices rise too late, to come between us and the unseen region on the other shore! Better, far better, that they whispered of that region in our childish ears, and the swift river hurried us away!

== Characters ==
In order of appearance:

Chapter 1

- Mr Paul Dombey: The main character, about 48 years old as the novel opens. "In all his life, he had never made a friend. His cold and distant nature had neither sought one, nor found one". He is left a widower with two children by the end of Chapter 1. However he considers only his son, Paul, to be worthy of his attention; his daughter, Florence, is "merely a piece of base coin that couldn't be invested – a bad boy". The son's death shatters Mr Dombey's hopes for an heir. His neglect of his daughter, Florence, causes problems with his second wife, Edith, whom he essentially purchased. Owing to Edith's hatred for him and his own misplaced trust in James Carker, Dombey loses his business and his wealth. Dombey finally realises that his daughter was the only person who truly cared for him, even when he has nothing left. He reconnects with her in his later years and gains an heir through his son-in-law.
- Mrs Fanny Dombey: Mr Dombey's first wife, mother of Florence and Paul; dies soon after Paul is born
- Master Paul Dombey (Little Dombey): Born as the novel begins; he is weak and often ill. A gentle child, he is adored by his sister, Florence, and beloved of his schoolmates. He dies of an unspecified illness in Chapter 16.
- Miss Florence (Floy) Dombey: Mr Dombey's daughter, about 6 years old as the novel begins. She dotes on her little brother. Despite her father's neglect, which amounts to emotional abuse, she loves him and longs for some return of her affection. During an unauthorized outing with Mrs Richards (Toodle) she is snatched from the street by Good Mrs Brown. After her father's wedding to Edith she bonds with her stepmother. Florence flees the house after her father violently strikes her and takes refuge with Captain Cuttle at The Wooden Midshipman. She eventually marries Walter Gay and bears him two children.
- Dr Parker Peps: One of the Court Physicians, pompously confuses Mrs Dombey's name with the names of aristocrats whom he has treated
- Mrs Blockitt: Nurse, "a simpering piece of faded gentility"
- Mr Pilkins: Physician of the Dombey family, defers obsequiously to Dr Peps
- Mrs Louisa Dombey Chick: Mr Dombey's sister; an anaemic copy of her brother, who is also the only person for whom she has any affection.
- Miss Lucretia Tox: Friend of Mrs Chick until their falling-out, great admirer of Mr Dombey and neighbour of Major Bagstock

Chapter 2

- Mr John Chick: Husband of Mrs Chick
- Mr Toodle: A locomotive stoker
- Mrs Polly Toodle (Richards): Fertile wife of Mr Toodle, engaged as wet nurse to young Paul. Mr Dombey wants her to use "an ordinary name, and convenient" while in his employ and thus requires her to answer to the name of Richards. During an ill-advised visit to her home in Staggs's Gardens, Florence is temporarily taken by Good Mrs Brown. Mr Dombey is undisturbed by the loss of his daughter in the urban crowd but is incensed that Mrs Richards dared to take his son "to such vile haunts" and summarily discharges her. Later she is brought back by Captain Cuttle to keep house at The Wooden Midshipman
- Robin Toodle (Rob the Grinder, Biler): Son of Mr Toodle and Polly. Sent to the Charitable Grinders school through Mr Dombey's largesse, he cannot resist the lure of tending pigeons and plays truant. A pathetic boy, Rob is manipulated by the adults and cannot find a way to better his lot. He is forced by Mr Carker, the Manager, to spy on Captain Cuttle and report the comings and goings at The Wooden Midshipman. After Carker absconds late in the book, Rob is forced by Good Mrs Brown to bring her information concerning the location in France to which Carker and Mrs Dombey have fled.

Chapter 3

- Miss Susan Nipper: Florence's spitfire loyal nurse, about 14 years old at the time of her introduction to the reader. She believes that "childhood, like money, must be shaken and rattled and jostled about a good deal to keep it bright". After about ten years she courageously berates Mr Dombey for his emotional neglect of his daughter and is summarily dismissed from the house. She is later joyfully reunited with Florence at The Wooden Midshipman and eventually marries Mr Toots.

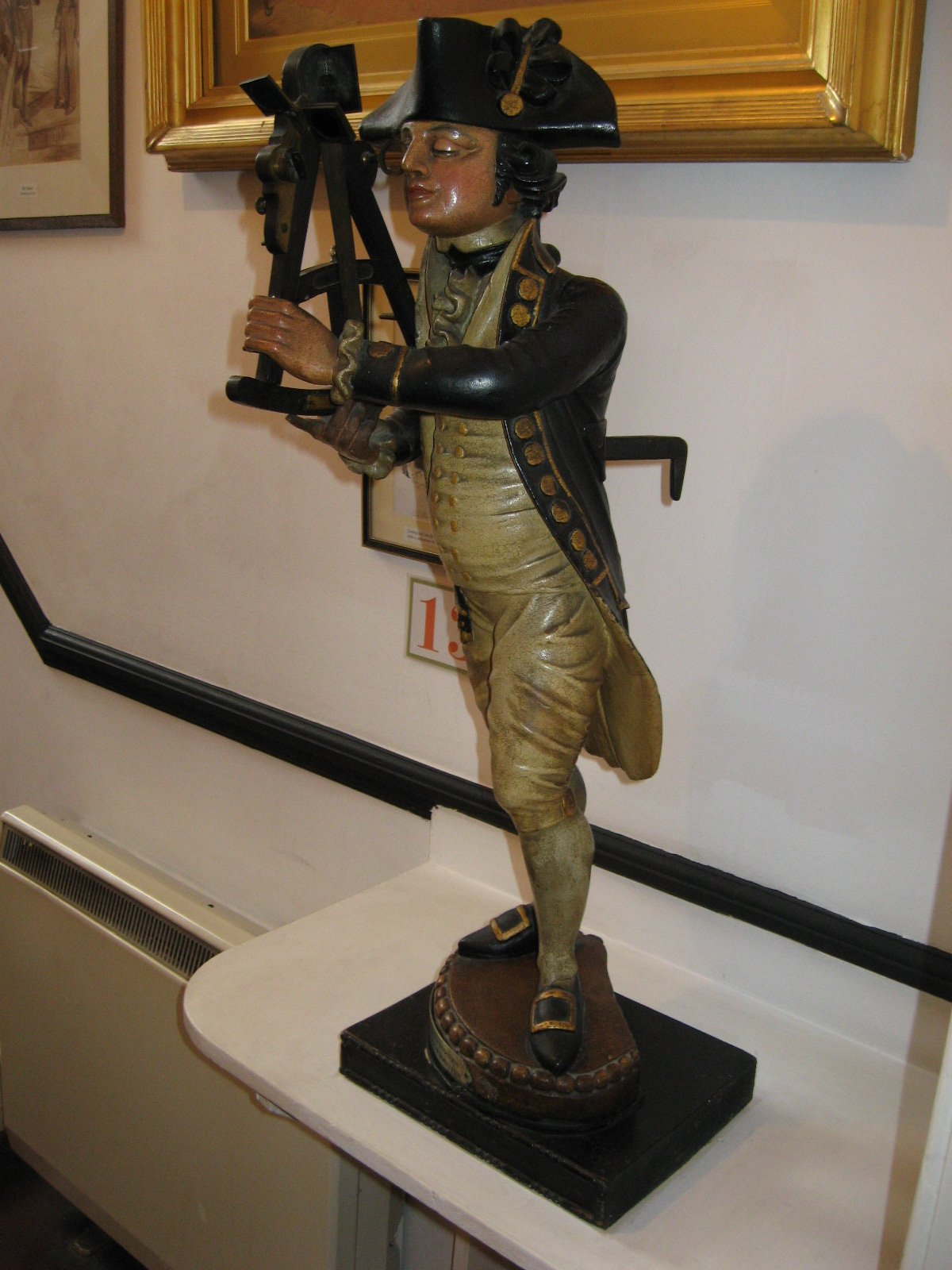
The Wooden Midshipman of Uncle Sol's nautical instrument shop of the same name. Statue in the Charles Dickens Museum

Chapter 4

- Solomon (Uncle Sol) Gills: "An elderly gentleman in a Welsh wig", maker of and dealer in ships' instruments, proprietor of The Wooden Midshipman. He goes missing while searching for his nephew Walter in the Caribbean but returns late in the book.
- Walter (Wally, Wal'r) Gay: Nephew of Solomon Gills, employee of Mr Dombey, about 14 years old at the time of introduction to the reader. Vindictively sent to Barbados by Mr Carker, the Manager. Long feared to have been lost at sea, he reappears in Chapter 49. Bears a deep affection for Florence ever since rescuing her from Good Mrs Brown
- Captain Edward (Ned) Cuttle: Retired hook-handed sea captain and friend of Solomon Gills. Terrified of his landlady, Mrs MacStinger, he sneaks out of her house and moves into The Wooden Midshipman. He loyally keeps the shop running during Walter and Uncle Sol's absence and provides refuge for Florence after she flees her father's house.

Chapter 6

- Good Mrs Brown: An elderly rag dealer who briefly kidnaps the young Florence from a street crowd and steals her fine clothes. She refrains from cutting off Florence's hair only because she has a daughter of her own who is "far away", foreshadowing the appearance of Alice later in the book. Greedily provides Mr Dombey with Rob the Grinder's information on where his wife and Mr Carker the Manager have fled.
- John Carker (Mr Carker the Junior): Older brother of James, disgraced himself by stealing from the firm of Dombey and Son during the time Mr Dombey's father was running it. "Not old but his hair was white; his body was bent or bowed" with "deep lines in his worn and melancholy face". Called "The Junior" to designate his place in the firm, not in relation to his (younger) brother

Chapter 7

- Major Joseph Bagstock: Conceited retired army major. "Wooden-featured, blue-faced" with "long-flapped elephantine ears", he refers to himself annoyingly in the third person as Josh, Joe, Joey B., J.B., Old Joe, etc. He befriends Mr Dombey at Brighton, and fatefully introduces him to Mrs Skewton and her daughter. Bagstock convinces himself that Miss Tox finds him appealing when in reality she has eyes only for Mr Dombey.
- The Native: Bagstock's servant who comes from an unspecified country, presumably a British colony, and has "no particular name, but answered to any vituperative epithet".

Chapter 8

- Mrs Wickam: Replacement as young Paul's nurse after the disgrace and dismissal of Mrs Richards, "a meek woman, of a fair complexion, with her eyebrows always elevated, and her head always drooping"
- Berinthia (Berry): Mrs Pipchin's unmarried niece and servant
- Mrs Pipchin: Stern widow who keeps an "infantine Boarding-House of a very select description" in Brighton, where Paul is sent for his health. "A marvellous ill-favoured, ill-conditioned old lady, of a stooping figure, with a mottled face, like bad marble". An implacable enemy of Susan Nipper, she later heads the Dombey household
- Master Bitherstone: Another child at Mrs Pipchin's, where he receives ill treatment from the proprietress. Much later a student at Doctor Blimber's
- Miss Pankey: Another child at Mrs Pipchin's, "was shampoo'd every morning, and seemed in danger of being rubbed away altogether"

Chapter 9

- Mr Brogley: Dealer in second-hand goods and broker. "A moist-eyed, pink-complexioned, crisp-haired man of a bulky figure, and an easy temper". He demands payment on a bond of Mr Gills's, forcing the latter to consider the desperate move of selling all his merchandise.
- Mrs MacStinger: Lets rooms in her building in the docklands of the East End; Captain Cuttle's fierce landlady and nemesis

Chapter 11

- Doctor Blimber: Operates a school in Brighton ("a great hot-house, in which there was a forcing apparatus incessantly at work") which Paul briefly attends
- Mr P. Toots: The oldest student at Dr Blimber's school, "possessed of the gruffest of voices and the shrillest of minds", something of a dandy ("people did say ... that when he began to have whiskers he left off having brains"). Often becomes tongue-tied and strings together nearly nonsensical series of words. In love with Florence but miserably backs off upon learning of her attachment to Walter Gay. He finds happiness at the end of the book in marriage to Susan Nipper.
- Mrs Blimber: Doctor Blimber's wife
- Miss Cornelia Blimber: Doctor Blimber's bespectacled daughter, teacher at the school, later married to Mr Feeder

Chapter 12

- Mr Feeder, B.A.: Doctor Blimber's assistant, teacher at the school and later its owner. "In the habit of shaving his head for coolness, and had nothing but bristles on it"
- Briggs: Another boy at Doctor Blimber's school, 'the stony boy'
- Tozer: Another boy at Doctor Blimber's school

Chapter 13

- Mr Perch: Messenger in Mr Dombey's business, always hurries to prepare Mr Dombey's office when the latter comes through the front door. Considered an irritant by Susan Nipper
- Mr Morfin: Assistant manager in Mr Dombey's business. He plays 'cello and participates in "quartettes of the most tormenting and excruciating nature ... every Wednesday evening". Brings aid to John Carker and his sister Harriett late in the book
- James Carker (Mr Carker the Manager): Devious manager in Mr Dombey's business, smiles constantly in a way that exposes all his teeth. "Sly of manner, sharp of tooth, soft of foot, watchful of eye, oily of tongue, cruel of heart, nice of habit". He physically abuses Rob the Grinder and sends him to spy on the goings-on at The Wooden Midshipman. While appearing loyally to serve Mr Dombey for years, he has actually been self-dealing. He manipulates Edith Dombey into meeting him in France, but is shocked to learn that Mr Dombey has discovered his whereabouts and is pursuing him. He is killed by a train after seeing Mr Dombey on the platform.

Chapter 14

- Sir Barnet Skettles: Attends Dr Blimber's dance with his wife and child where he converses with Mr Baps about the latter's work with "figures". Sir Barnet then learns from Dr Blimber that Mr Baps is in fact a dancing master, thus revealing that the "figures" referred to were not the ones Sir Barnet had assumed. He flies into "a perfect rage" and glowers at Mr Baps.
- Lady Skettles: wife of Sir Barnet
- Master Skettles: Brighton school pupil
- Diogenes (Di): A large dog from Dr Blimber's school, befriended by Paul and adopted by Florence after Paul's death. Follows Florence when she flees her father's household

Chapter 18

- Mr Towlinson: Mr Dombey's butler

Chapter 21

- Mrs Skewton ('Cleopatra'): Seventy years old but dresses as if she were 20. Introduced to Mr Dombey by her old friend Major Bagstock at Leamington. Ambitious for herself and her daughter, she urges Edith to marry Mr Dombey. Has a stroke and later dies
- Edith Skewton Granger: Chilly, haughty beauty, daughter of Mrs Skewton, widow of an army officer, lost a small son to drowning. Becomes second Mrs Dombey. The conflict between Edith's pride and Mr Dombey's is a key element of the story. She and her mother have had prior financial dealings with Mr Carker the Manager and Edith dislikes him intensely. She is determined that her unspoiled, innocent stepdaughter Florence will not suffer her fate of essentially being sold to men. After abandoning Mr Dombey in a rage of resentment, she is later partially reconciled to him through the intervention of Florence in a very poignant parting scene between Edith and Florence at the end of the book.

Chapter 22

- The Game Chicken: boxer and rowdy companion of Mr Toots

Chapter 23

- Jack Bunsby: captain of the Cautious Clara; taciturn but regarded as an oracle by Captain Cuttle, eventually wedded to Mrs MacStinger
- Cousin Feenix: Relative of the Skewtons. Returning from the spa at Baden-Baden, he drunkenly toasts Edith's marriage to Dombey. The couple live in his house while the Dombey mansion is being renovated.

Chapter 33

- Miss Harriet Carker: Sister of James and John, disowned by James for taking John's side in the wake of the latter's disgrace

Chapter 34

- Alice: daughter of Mrs Brown, recently returned from transportation. Nurses a deep hatred of all the Carkers owing to having been once used as a sex object and discarded by Mr Carker the Manager, who then refused to aid her when she got in trouble with the law. Eventually reconciles with Harriet

== Critical appreciation ==
Dombey and Son was conceived first and foremost as a continuous novel. A letter from Dickens to Forster on 26 July 1846 shows the major details of the plot and theme already substantially worked out. According to the novelist George Gissing,

Dombey was begun at Lausanne, continued at Paris, completed in London, and at English seaside places; whilst the early parts were being written, a Christmas story, The Battle of Life, was also in hand, and Dickens found it troublesome to manage both together. That he overcame the difficulty—that, soon after, we find him travelling about England as member of an amateur dramatic company—that he undertook all sorts of public engagements and often devoted himself to private festivity—Dombey going on the while, from month to month—is matter enough for astonishment to those who know anything about artistic production. But such marvels become commonplaces in the life of Charles Dickens.

There is some evidence to suggest that Dombey and Son was inspired by the life of Christopher Huffam, Rigger to His Majesty's Navy, a gentleman and head of an established firm, Huffam & Son. Charles Dickens's father, John Dickens, at the time a clerk in the Navy Pay Office, asked the wealthy, well-connected Huffam to act as godfather to Charles. This same Huffam family appeared later in Charles Palliser's 1989 The Quincunx, a homage to the Dickensian novel form.

As with most of Dickens's work, a number of socially significant themes are to be found in this book. In particular the book deals with the then-prevalent common practice of arranged marriages for financial gain. Other themes to be detected within this work include child cruelty (particularly in Dombey's treatment of Florence), familial relationships, and as ever in Dickens, betrayal and deceit and the consequences thereof. Another strong central theme, which the critic George Gissing elaborates on in detail in his 1925 work The Immortal Dickens, is that of pride and arrogance, of which Paul Dombey senior is the extreme exemplification in Dickens's work.

Gissing makes a number of points about certain key inadequacies in the novel, not the least that Dickens's central character is largely unsympathetic and an unsuitable vehicle and also that after the death of the young Paul Dombey the reader is somewhat estranged from the rest of what is to follow. He notes that "the moral theme of this book was Pride—pride of wealth, pride of place, personal arrogance. Dickens started with a clear conception of his central character and of the course of the story in so far as it depended upon that personage; he planned the action, the play of motive, with unusual definiteness, and adhered very closely in the working to this well-laid scheme". However, he goes on to write that "Dombey and Son is a novel which in its beginning promises more than its progress fulfils" and gives the following reasons why:

Impossible to avoid the reflection that the death of Dombey's son and heir marks the end of a complete story, that we feel a gap between Chapter XVI and what comes after (the author speaks of feeling it himself, of his striving to "transfer the interest to Florence") and that the narrative of the later part is ill-constructed, often wearisome, sometimes incredible. We miss Paul, we miss Walter Gay (shadowy young hero though he be); Florence is too colourless for deep interest, and the second Mrs Dombey is rather forced upon us than accepted as a natural figure in the drama. Dickens's familiar shortcomings are abundantly exemplified. He is wholly incapable of devising a plausible intrigue, and shocks the reader with monstrous improbabilities such as all that portion of the denouement in which old Mrs Brown and her daughter are concerned. A favourite device with him (often employed with picturesque effect) was to bring into contact persons representing widely severed social ranks; in this book the "effect" depends too often on "incidences of the boldest artificiality," as nearly always we end by neglecting the story as a story, and surrendering ourselves to the charm of certain parts, the fascination of certain characters.

=== Characters in the novel ===
Karl Ashley Smith, in his introduction to Wordsworth Classics' edition of Dombey and Son, makes some reflections on the novel's characters. He believes that Dombey's power to disturb comes from his belief that human relationships can be controlled by money, giving the following examples to support this viewpoint:

He tries to prevent Mrs Richards from developing an attachment to Paul by emphasising the wages he pays her. Mrs Pipchin's small talk satisfies him as "the sort of thing for which he paid her so much a quarter" (p.132). Worst of all, he effectively buys his second wife and expects that his wealth and position in society will be enough to keep her in awed obedience to him. Paul's questions about money are only the first indication of the naivety of his outlook.

However, he also believes that the satire against this man is tempered with compassion.

Smith also draws attention to the fact that certain characters in the novel "develop a pattern from Dickens's earlier novels, whilst pointing the way to future works". One such character is Little Paul who is a direct descendant of Little Nell. Another is James Carker, the ever-smiling manager of Dombey and Son. Smith notes there are strong similarities between him and the likes of Jaggers in Great Expectations and, even more so, the evil barrister, Mr Tulkinghorn, in Bleak House:

From Fagin (Oliver Twist) onwards, the terrifying figure exerting power over others by an infallible knowledge of their secrets becomes one of the author's trademarks ... James Carker's gentlemanly businesslike respectability marks him out as the ancestor of Tulkinghorn in Bleak House and even of Jaggers in Great Expectations. And his involvements in the secrets of others leads him to as sticky an end as Tulkinghorn's. The fifty-fifth chapter, where he is forced to flee his outraged employer, magnificently continues the theme of the guilt-hunted man from Bill Sikes in Oliver Twist and Jonas's restless sense of pursuit in Martin Chuzzlewit. There is always a strong sense in Dickens of the narrative drive of discovery catching up with those who deal in darkness.

Gissing looks at some of the minor characters in the novel and is particularly struck by that of Edward (Ned) Cuttle.

Captain Cuttle has a larger humanity than his roaring friend [Captain Bunsby], he is the creation of humour. That the Captain suffered dire things at the hands of Mrs MacStinger is as credible as it is amusing, but he stood in no danger of Bunsby's fate; at times he can play his part in a situation purely farcical, but the man himself moves on a higher level. He is one of the most familiar to us among Dickens's characters, an instance of the novelist's supreme power, which (I like to repeat) proves itself in the bodying forth of a human personality henceforth accepted by the world. His sentences have become proverbs; the mention of his name brings before the mind's eye an image of flesh and blood – rude, tending to the grotesque, but altogether lovable. Captain Cuttle belongs to the world of Uncle Toby, with, to be sure, a subordinate position. Analyse him as you will, make the most of those extravagances which pedants of to-day cannot away with, and in the end you will still be face to face with something vital – explicable only as the product of genius.

=== The growth of the railways ===
One theme is the destruction and degradation, of both people and places, caused by industrialisation, illustrated in particular by the building of the new railway through Camden Town (assumed to represent the London and Birmingham Railway constructed between 1833 and 1837). The novel reflects to some extent Dickens's concerns with railway travel and the "railway mania", "a fascination which had a strong ingredient of fear in it", and reflects ambivalence towards the effects of the railways – they generated prosperity and employment, but undermined older ways of living and encouraged speculation. In 1865, many years after this novel was published, Dickens was involved in a train crash. Soon after this incident he wrote two short stories, "Mugby Junction" and "The Signal-Man", which projected a morbid view of the railways.

=== Folklore, legends and myth ===
See Folklore, legends and myths in Dombey and Son

Dombey and Son draws heavily from popular literature inspired by legendary folklore, contemporary melodramas, and traditional pantomime. It also incorporates some fairy tales and ancient myths like Argus or the Cyclops.

=== Final thoughts ===
Gissing refers to Dickens's instinctive genius for reflecting the thoughts and morals of the common man in his writing. He observes that the author was in constant communication with Forster,

as to the feeling of his readers about some proposed incident or episode; not that he feared, in any ignoble sense, to offend his public, but because his view of art involved compliance with ideals of ordinary simple folk. He held that view as a matter of course. Quite recently it has been put forth with prophetic fervour by Tolstoy, who cites Dickens among the few novelists whose work will bear this test. An instinctive sympathy with the moral (and therefore the artistic) prejudices of the everyday man guided Dickens throughout his career, teaching him when, and how far, he might strike at things he thought evil, yet never defeat his prime purpose of sending forth fiction acceptable to the multitude. Himself, in all but his genius, a representative Englishman of the middle-class, he was able to achieve this task with unfailing zeal and with entire sincerity.

Karl Smith, in his turn, gives his specific reasons for what makes Dombey and Son – and the works of Dickens as a whole – worth reading again and again. He observes that this is based in part on Dickens's "recognition that solemn themes require humour and verbal vigour to accompany and complement them" and goes on to conclude:

Grim psychological realism, social commentary, comic absurdity and symbolic transcendence are here brought together more than in any previous novel with the possible exception of Oliver Twist. Dombey and Son not only prepares the ground for Dickens's later masterpieces, but demands to be enjoyed for its own energy and richness.

== Adaptations ==
Theatre:

- 1848 – a play adaptation by John Brougham that premiered at Burton's Theatre in July 1848 with William Evans Burton as Captain Cuttle

Television:

- 1969 miniseries – starring John Carson as Paul Dombey and Derek Seaton as Walter Gay. First adaptation by the BBC.
- 1974 – Dombi i syn a Soviet teleplay starring Valentin Gaft as Paul Dombey and Konstantin Raikin as Walter Gay
- 1983 miniseries – starring Julian Glover as Paul Dombey and Max Gold as Walter Gay. Second and final adaptation by the BBC.
- 2007 – Dombais et fils a French television mini-series starring Christophe Malavoy as Charles Dombais (=Paul Dombey)
- Andrew Davies attempted to pen a new adaptation of Dombey after the success of Bleak House and Little Dorrit, but the BBC scrapped the plans, wanting to move away from "bonnet dramas"

Film:

- 1917 – Dombey and Son a British Silent film starring Norman McKinnel as Paul Dombey and Hayford Hobbs as Walter Gay
- 1931 – Rich Man's Folly a loose adaptation of the novel which is modernised and set in the United States. The named Dombey was also replaced with Trumbull

Radio:

- 2007 – a twenty-part BBC Radio 4 adaptation, totalling four and a half hours, written by Mike Walker, with Alex Jennings as the voice of Charles Dickens, Robert Glenister as Dombey, Abigail Hollick as Florence, Helen Schlesinger as Edith, Trevor Peacock as Captain Cuttle, Adrian Lukis as Carker, Geraldine James as Mrs Brown and Sam Pamphilon as Toots.

== Original publication ==
Dombey and Son was originally published in 19 monthly instalments; each cost one shilling (except for the last, which cost two shillings, being a double issue) and contained 32 pages of text with two illustrations by Phiz:

- I – October 1846 (chapters 1–4);
- II – November 1846 (chapters 5–7);
- III – December 1846 (chapters 8–10);
- IV – January 1847 (chapters 11–13);
- V – February 1847 (chapters 14–16);
- VI – March 1847 (chapters 17–19);
- VII – April 1847 (chapters 20–22);
- VIII – May 1847 (chapters 23–25);
- IX – June 1847 (chapters 26–28);
- X – July 1847 (chapters 29–31);
- XI – August 1847 (chapters 32–34);
- XII – September 1847 (chapters 35–38);
- XIII – October 1847 (chapters 39–41);
- XIV – November 1847 (chapters 42–45);
- XV – December 1847 (chapters 46–48);
- XVI – January 1848 (chapters 49–51);
- XVII – February 1848 (chapters 52–54);
- XVIII – March 1848 (chapters 55–57);
- XIX-XX – April 1848 (chapters 58–62).

Dombey and Son appeared in monthly parts from October 1846 to April 1848 and in one volume in 1848.

== Sources ==
- Dickens, Charles. Dombey and Son. Wordsworth Classics, 1995. ISBN 1-85326-257-9
- Dickens, Charles. Dombey and Son. New York: Modern Library, 2003.
