= 1958 in literature =

This article contains information about the literary events and publications of 1958.

== Events ==
- January 7 – Tennessee Williams' one-act plays Suddenly, Last Summer and Something Unspoken are premièred off-Broadway.
- January 13 – In One, Inc. v. Olesen, the Supreme Court of the United States affirms that homosexual writing is not as such obscene.
- March 29 – The stage première of Max Frisch's dark comedy Biedermann und die Brandstifter (known in English as The Fire Raisers) takes place at the Schauspielhaus Zürich.
- April 28 – The première of Harold Pinter's play The Birthday Party is held at the Cambridge Arts Theatre in England, with Richard Pearson playing the lead as Stanley.
- May 19 – The London début of the production of Pinter's The Birthday Party, starring Richard Pearson, takes place at the Lyric Opera House (Hammersmith). It closes after a week, but its reputation is saved by a review by Harold Hobson in The Sunday Times on May 25.
- May 27 – The 19-year-old Shelagh Delaney's A Taste of Honey is staged by Joan Littlewood's Theatre Workshop at the Theatre Royal Stratford East in London. Littlewood had received the script with a covering letter stating "A fortnight ago I didn't know the theatre existed".
- Spring/Summer – London publishers Faber introduce their paper-covered editions, including T. S. Eliot's Collected Poems, William Golding's Lord of the Flies, J. W. Dunne's An Experiment with Time and the first of several science fiction anthologies edited by Edmund Crispin, all with covers designed by Berthold Wolpe based on the Albertus typeface.
- August 18 – Vladimir Nabokov's controversial novel Lolita is published in the United States.
- c. September – Herbert Marcuse begins teaching at Brandeis University, Massachusetts.
- October 14 – Brendan Behan's play The Hostage is first performed in an English version by Joan Littlewood's Theatre Workshop at the Theatre Royal Stratford East in London. Also this year, Behan's autobiographical Borstal Boy is published in London, and on November 12 it is banned in Ireland by the Censorship of Publications Board.
- October 23 – Announcement of the award of the Nobel Prize in Literature to Boris Pasternak leads to denunciation of him in the Soviet Union and threats to expel him.
- October 28 – Samuel Beckett's monologue Krapp's Last Tape is first performed by Patrick Magee at the Royal Court Theatre, London. Also this year, Beckett's novel The Unnamable is first published in English.
- November – Truman Capote's novella Breakfast at Tiffany's is published in this month's Esquire magazine (having been rejected for July's Harper's Bazaar). It appears soon afterwards as the title story in a collection published by Random House in New York City.
- unknown dates
  - The first volume of Shelby Foote's military history The Civil War: A Narrative is published in the United States.
  - Jack Kerouac writes and narrates the "beat" film, Pull My Daisy (released 1959).
  - Ken Kesey is awarded a Woodrow Wilson National Fellowship to enrol in the creative writing program at Stanford University.
  - Mervyn Peake begins to develop Parkinson's disease.

== New books ==
=== Fiction ===
- Chinua Achebe – Things Fall Apart
- Kingsley Amis – I Like It Here
- Jorge Amado – Gabriela, Clove and Cinnamon (Gabriela, Cravo e Canela)
- Louis Aragon – La Semaine Sainte
- Chingiz Aytmatov – Jamila
- Layla Balabakki – I Live (أنا أحيا)
- H. E. Bates – The Darling Buds of May
- Samuel Beckett – The Unnamable (author's translation of L'Innommable (1953))
- Margot Bennett – Someone from the Past
- Thomas Berger – Crazy in Berlin
- John Bingham – Murder Plan Six
- James Blish – A Case of Conscience
- Anita Rowe Block – Love Is a Four Letter Word
- Joseph Payne Brennan – Nine Horrors and a Dream
- Algis Budrys
  - Man of Earth
  - Who?
- Dino Buzzati – Sessanta racconti
- Philip Callow – Common People
- Truman Capote – Breakfast at Tiffany's
- John Dickson Carr – The Dead Man's Knock
- Rosario Castellanos – Balún-Canán
- Henry Cecil – Sober as a Judge
- Raymond Chandler – Playback
- Agatha Christie – Ordeal by Innocence
- Richard Condon – The Oldest Confession
- A. J. Cronin
  - The Innkeeper's Wife
  - The Northern Light
- Cecil Day-Lewis – A Penknife in My Heart
- L. Sprague de Camp – An Elephant for Aristotle
- Patrick Dennis – Around the World with Auntie Mame
- August Derleth
  - The Mask of Cthulhu
  - The Return of Solar Pons
- Elaine Dundy – The Dud Avocado
- Marguerite Duras – Moderato Cantabile
- Lawrence Durrell
  - Balthazar
  - Mountolive
- Nawal El Saadawi – Memoirs of a Woman Doctor (Moudhakkarat tabibat)
- Ian Fleming – Dr. No
- C. S. Forester – Hornblower in the West Indies
- Carlos Fuentes – Where the Air Is Clear (first published in Spanish as La región más transparente)
- Peter George – Red Alert
- Rumer Godden – The Greengage Summer
- Julien Gracq – Balcony in the Forest (Un Balcon en forêt)
- Graham Greene – Our Man in Havana
- Cyril Hare – He Should Have Died Hereafter
- Marlen Haushofer – We Murder Stella (Wir töten Stella)
- A. P. Herbert – Made for Man
- Georgette Heyer – Venetia
- Thomas Hinde – Happy as Larry
- Harold L. Humes – The Underground City
- Emyr Humphreys – A Toy Epic
- Hammond Innes – The Land God Gave to Cain
- Michael Innes – The Long Farewell
- Rona Jaffe – The Best of Everything
- Anna Kavan – A Bright Green Field and Other Stories
- Jack Kerouac
  - The Dharma Bums
  - The Subterraneans
- Frances Parkinson Keyes – Victorine
- Audrey Erskine Lindop– I Thank a Fool
- Giuseppe Tomasi di Lampedusa (died 1957) – The Leopard (Il Gattopardo)
- E. C. R. Lorac – Murder on a Monument
- John D. MacDonald – The Executioners
- Ross Macdonald – The Doomsters
- Richard Matheson – A Stir of Echoes
- Gladys Mitchell – Spotted Hemlock
- Alberto Moravia – Two Women (La ciociara)
- Penelope Mortimer – Daddy's Gone A-Hunting
- Iris Murdoch – The Bell
- M. T. Vasudevan Nair – Naalukettu
- R. K. Narayan – The Guide
- Kenzaburō Ōe (大江 健三郎) – Nip the Buds, Shoot the Kids (芽むしり仔撃ち, Memushiri ko-uchi)
- Maurice Procter – Man in Ambush
- Barbara Pym – A Glass of Blessings
- Jean Raspail – Welcome, Honourable Visitors
- Ernest Raymond – The Quiet Shore
- Mary Renault – The King Must Die
- Anya Seton – The Winthrop Woman
- Alan Sillitoe – Saturday Night and Sunday Morning
- Terry Southern (as Maxwell Kenton) – Candy
- Rex Stout
  - And Four to Go
  - Champagne for One
- Randolph Stow – To the Islands
- Yves Thériault – Agaguk
- Zaim Topčić – Lump of Sun (Grumen sunca)
- Robert Traver – Anatomy of a Murder
- Leon Uris – Exodus
- Jack Vance – The Languages of Pao
- Rex Warner – Young Caesar
- Jerome Weidman – The Enemy Camp
- T. H. White – The Once and Future King (combined edition)
- Angus Wilson – The Middle Age of Mrs Eliot
- S. Yizhar – Days of Ziklag (ימי צקלג, Yemei Tziklag)

=== Children and young people ===
- Raymond Abrashkin and Jay Williams – Danny Dunn and the Homework Machine
- Rev. W. Awdry – Duck and the Diesel Engine (thirteenth in The Railway Series of 42 books by him and his son Christopher Awdry)
- Enid Blyton – Five Get into a Fix
- Michael Bond – A Bear Called Paddington (introducing Paddington Bear)
- Bruce Carter – The Kidnapping of Kensington
- Anne de Vries – The New Day (De Nieuwe Dag, last in the Journey Through the Night – Reis door de nacht series)
- E. W. Hildick – Jim Starling (first of a series of seven)
- A. A. Milne, Latin by Alexander Lenard – Winnie ille Pu
- Elyne Mitchell – The Silver Brumby (first in the Silver Brumby series)
- Philippa Pearce – Tom's Midnight Garden
- Keith Robertson – Henry Reed Inc. (first in the Henry Reed series)
- Dr. Seuss – Yertle the Turtle and Other Stories
- Elizabeth George Speare – The Witch of Blackbird Pond
- William O. Steele – The Perilous Road
- Catherine Storr – Marianne Dreams
- Rosemary Sutcliff – Warrior Scarlet
- Nigel Tranter – Spaniard's Isle
- Henry Treece – The Children's Crusade

=== Drama ===
- Samuel Beckett – Krapp's Last Tape
- Brendan Behan – The Hostage
- Bertolt Brecht – The Resistible Rise of Arturo Ui (Der aufhaltsame Aufstieg des Arturo Ui, written 1941, first performed)
- Agatha Christie
  - The Unexpected Guest
  - Verdict
- Clemence Dane – Eighty in the Shade
- Refik Erduran – Bir Kilo Namus (One Kilo Honesty)
- Max Frisch – The Fire Raisers (Biedermann und die Brandstifter, first stage adaptation)
- Jean Genet – The Blacks: A Clown Show (Les Nègres, clownerie, first published)
- Kenneth Horne – Wolf's Clothing
- N. C. Hunter – A Touch of the Sun
- Ann Jellicoe – The Sport of My Mad Mother
- Ronald Millar – The Big Tickle
- Sławomir Mrożek – The Police (Policja)
- Heiner Müller and Inge Müller
  - Die Korrektur (The Correction)
  - Der Lohndrücker (The Scab, first performed)
- Mohan Rakesh – Ashadh Ka Ek Din (आषाढ़ का एक दिन, One Day in Ashadh)
- Barry Reckord – Flesh to a Tiger
- Elmer Rice – Cue for Passion
- Peter Shaffer – Five Finger Exercise
- N. F. Simpson – The Hole
- Wole Soyinka – The Swamp Dwellers
- Derek Walcott – Drums and Colours
- Arthur Watkyn – Not in the Book
- Arnold Wesker – Chicken Soup with Barley (first performed)
- Tennessee Williams – Suddenly, Last Summer

=== Poetry ===
- John Betjeman – Collected Poems
- Ko Un – Hyondae Munhak
- Octavio Paz – La estación violenta
- Eli Siegel – Hot Afternoons Have Been in Montana: Poems
- Clark Ashton Smith – Spells and Philtres

=== Non-fiction ===
- Henri Alleg – La Question
- Hannah Arendt – The Human Condition
- Brendan Behan – Borstal Boy
- Shelby Foote – The Civil War: A Narrative – Vol 1: Fort Sumter to Perryville
- John Kenneth Galbraith – The Affluent Society
- J. Edgar Hoover – Masters of Deceit
- Aldous Huxley – Brave New World Revisited
- Claude Lévi-Strauss – Structural Anthropology
- Philip O'Connor – Memoirs of a Public Baby
- Eric Partridge – Origins: A Short Etymological Dictionary of Modern English
- John Maynard Smith – The Theory of Evolution
- John Steinbeck – Once There Was A War
- Raymond Williams – Culture and Society 1780–1950
- Michael Young – The Rise of the Meritocracy

== Births ==
- February 9 – Walid al-Kubaisi, Norwegian-Iraqi author, journalist, translator, film director and government scholar (died 2018)
- March 14 – James Robertson, Scottish novelist
- April 6 – Graeme Base, English-born Australian children's author and illustrator
- April 15 – Benjamin Zephaniah, English dub poet (died 2023)
- May 7 – Robert Antoni, West Indian novelist
- May 8 – Roddy Doyle, Irish novelist
- May 14 – Anna Höglund, Swedish writer and illustrator
- May 18 – Jonathan Maberry, American writer
- May 21 – Taku Ashibe (芦辺 拓), Japanese mystery novelist
- May 22 – Wayne Johnston, Canadian novelist
- May 26 – Moinul Ahsan Saber, Bangladeshi writer and editor
- June 10 – James F. Conant, American philosopher
- June 14 – Todur Zanet, Gagauz poet and translator
- June 16 – Isobelle Carmody, Australian science fiction, fantasy and children's writer
- June 22 – Bruce Campbell, American actor, producer, writer and director
- July 3 – Charlie Higson, English speculative fiction writer
- July 5 – Veronica Guerin, Irish journalist (murdered 1996)
- August 15 – Victor Shenderovich, Russian writer
- August 29 – Michael Jackson, American pop singer, songwriter and author (died 2009)
- September 5 – Pierre Leroux, Canadian novelist, journalist and screenwriter
- October 30 – Flora Fraser, English biographer
- November 11 – Kathy Lette, Australian novelist, playwright and activist
- November 24 – Gregory Doran, English theater director
- December 2 – George Saunders, American fiction writer
- December 10 – Cornelia Funke, German children's author
- unknown dates
  - Lionel Fogarty, indigenous Australian poet (died 2026)
  - Margaret Smith, American poet
  - Nega Mezlekia, Ethiopian writer

== Deaths ==
- February 4 – Henry Kuttner, American science fiction author (born 1915)
- February 6 – Charles Langbridge Morgan, English novelist and dramatist (born 1894)
- February 24 – Herbert Adams, English writer of mystery novels (born 1874)
- March 15 – Michael Joseph, English publisher (born 1897)
- March 17 – Margiad Evans, Anglo-Welsh writer and poet (born 1909)
- March 21 – Cyril M. Kornbluth, American science fiction writer (born 1923)
- March 24 – Seumas O'Sullivan, Irish poet (born 1879)
- April 7 – Elliot Paul, American writer (born 1892)
- April 8 – Ethel Turner, English-born Australian novelist and children's author (born 1873)
- May 5 – James Branch Cabell, American fantasy author (born 1879)
- June 4 – Eleanor Hallowell Abbott, American fiction writer and poet (born 1872)
- June 10 – Angelina Weld Grimké, African-American playwright and poet (born 1880)
- June 28 – Alfred Noyes, English poet (born 1880)
- August 6 – Geoffrey Willans, English novelist and comic writer (born 1911)
- August 29 – Marjorie Flack, American author and illustrator (born 1897)
- September 11 – Robert W. Service, English-born Canadian comic poet (born 1874)
- October 7 – Louise Hammond Willis Snead, American writer, artist, and composer (born 1868)
- October 24 – G. E. Moore, English philosopher (born 1873)
- October 30 – Rose Macaulay, English novelist (born 1881)
- November 9 – Dorothy Canfield Fisher, American activist and novelist (born 1879)
- December 8
  - Nicolae Petrescu-Comnen, Romanian social scientist, historian and poet (born 1881)
  - Peig Sayers (Máiréad Ó Gaoithín), Irish seanchaí (traditional storyteller, born 1873)
- December 20 – J. C. Squire, English writer and critic (born 1884)

== Awards ==
- Carnegie Medal for children's literature: Philippa Pearce, Tom's Midnight Garden
- Friedenspreis des Deutschen Buchhandels: Karl Jaspers
- Hugo Award for Best Novel: Fritz Leiber, The Big Time
- James Tait Black Memorial Prize for fiction: Angus Wilson, The Middle Age of Mrs. Eliot
- James Tait Black Memorial Prize for biography: Joyce Hemlow, The History of Fanny Burney
- Miles Franklin Award: Randolph Stow, To the Islands
- Newbery Medal for children's literature: Harold Keith, Rifles for Watie
- Newdigate prize: Jon Stallworthy
- Nobel Prize in Literature: Boris Pasternak
- Premio Nadal: J. Vidal Cadellans, No era de los nuestros
- Pulitzer Prize for Drama: Ketti Frings, Look Homeward, Angel
- Pulitzer Prize for Fiction: James Agee, A Death In The Family
- Pulitzer Prize for Poetry: Robert Penn Warren, Promises: Poems 1954-1956
