= Esmée van Eeghen =

Dutch resistance fighter in World War II

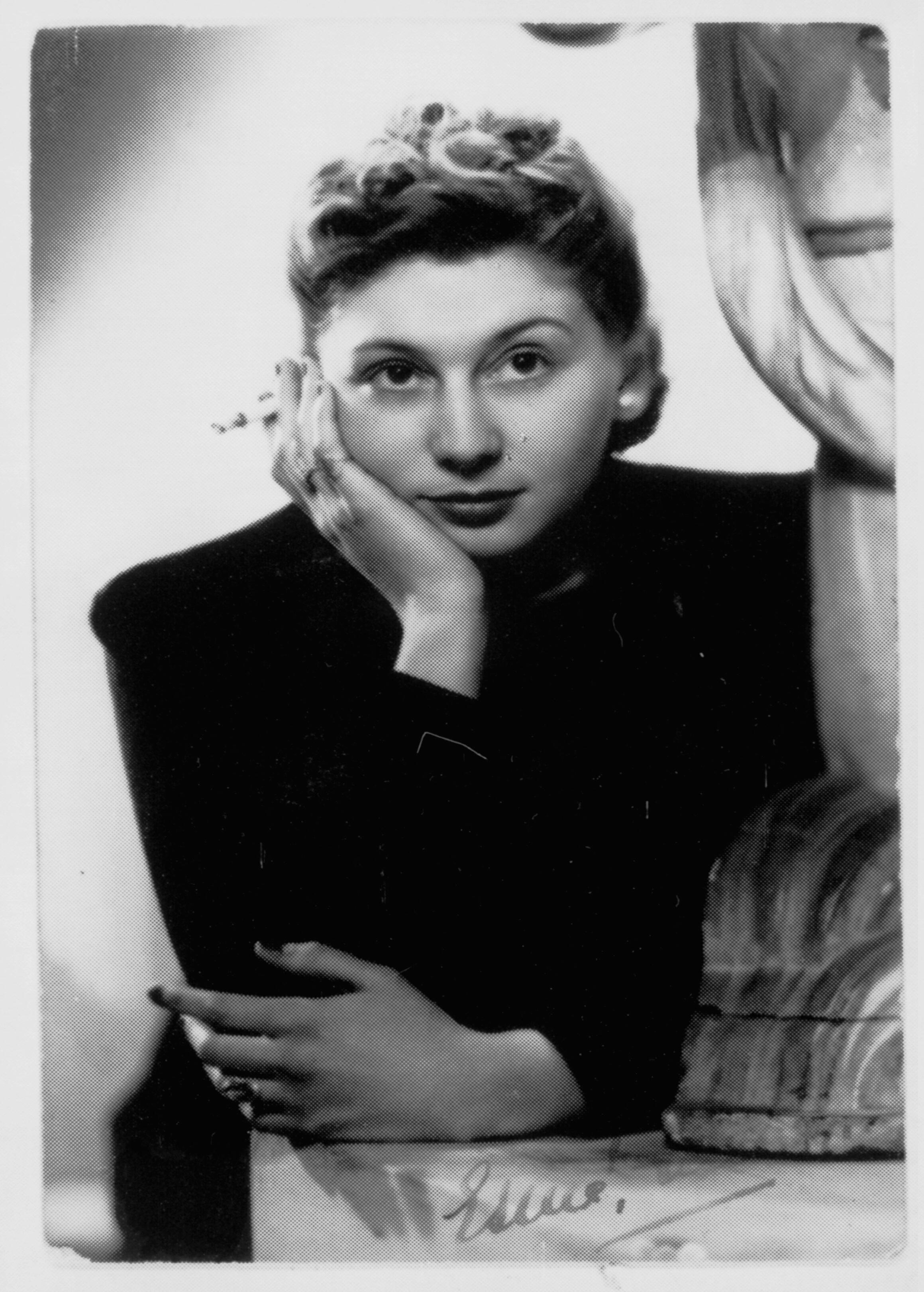
- Esmée van Eeghen c. 1940
- Born: 7 July 1918; Amsterdam, Netherlands
- Died: September 7, 1944 (aged 26); Paddepoel, Noorddijk, Netherlands
- Cause of death: Execution
- Occupation: Resistance fighter

Esmée Adrienne van Eeghen (7 July 1918 - 7 September 1944) was a Dutch resistance fighter in World War II. Van Eeghen is controversial because she fell in love with a German officer, but in spite of this played a significant role in the resistance, especially in Friesland, a role that would ultimately be fatal for her. The character Rachel Stein from the 2006 film Black Book was based on the life of van Eeghen.

== Early life ==
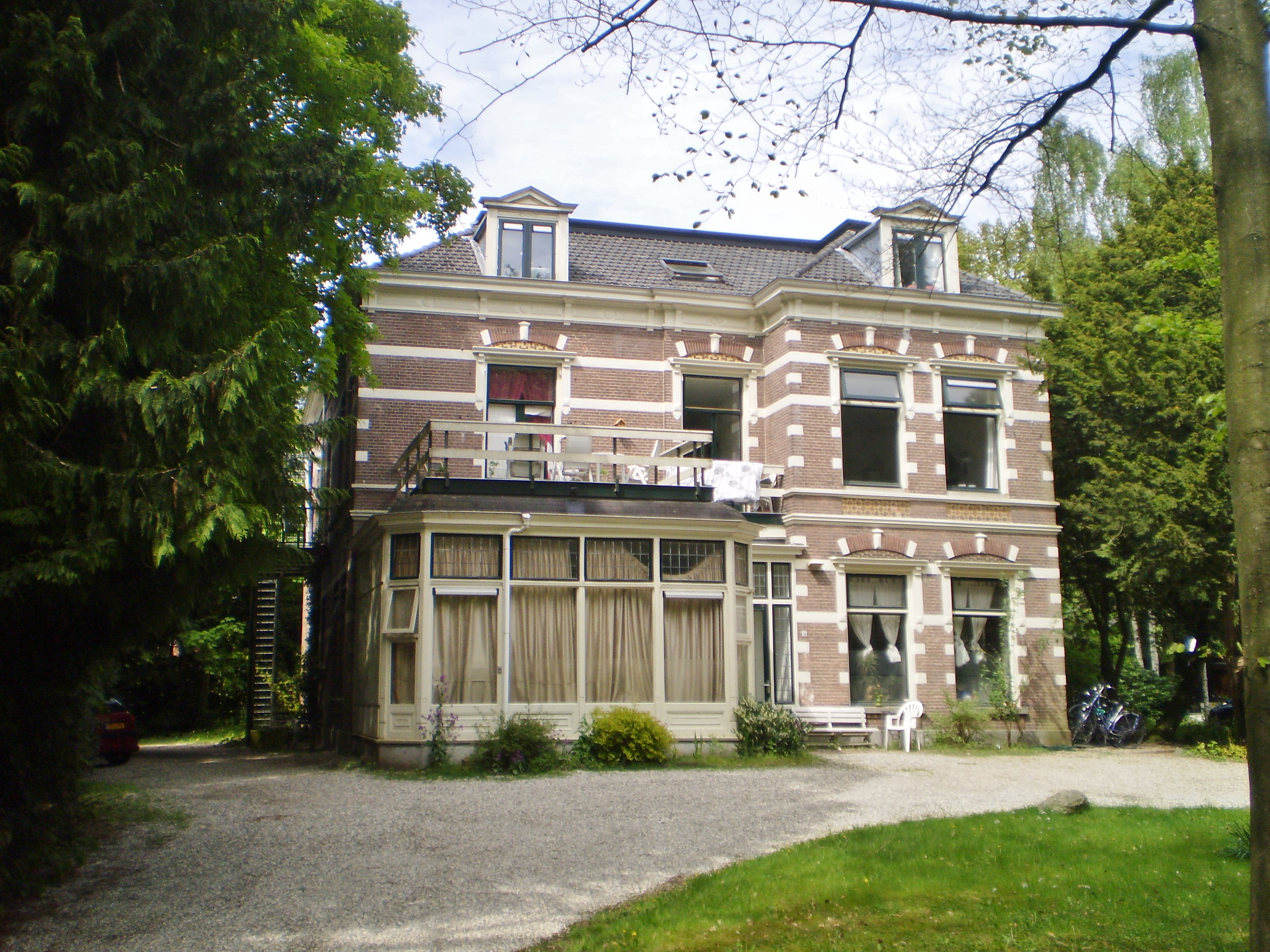
Former family home in Baarn, Gerrit van der Veenlaan 14 (2013)

Esmée van Eeghen was born in Amsterdam on 7 July 1918. Her parents were Reginald van Eeghen (1889-1936), director of the Amstel Brewery, and Minette Adrienne van Lennep (1892-1975), better known as Miesje van Lennep. (Note: Not to be confused with Mies Boissevain-van Lennep (1896-1965), also known as Mies Boissevain-van Lennep or Mies van Lennep-the feminist and resistance woman.) Esmée had a brother, Dave, who was two years her junior. She had a happy, sheltered childhood, even though her father left for America when she was eight after his divorce and died in San Francisco in 1936. Her mother remarried Alphert Schimmelpenninck van der Oye, by whom she had a third child, Sander.

== Resistance ==
Although van Eeghen was financially independent, she took up a job as a nurse in the Amsterdam civil hospital. In the spring of 1943 she entered into a love affair with the medical student Henk Kluvers. When he was supposed to sign the declaration of loyalty for students in the spring, he went to Leeuwarden to evade this signature. Van Eeghen followed him and supported him and his friend Pieter Meersburg to hide Jewish children on behalf of the Landelijke Organisatie voor Hulp aan Onderduikers (LO) in the north of the country. They saved the lives of at least 100 children. She wanted a family herself, but Kluvers was still in education and also had tuberculosis, so marriage was out of the question for him and he ended the relationship. (Note: Henk Kluvers later settled as a doctor in Bussum and, like Pieter Meersburg, was honored in 1997 as Righteous Among the Nations.)

In order to arrange accommodations for Amsterdam children, they both came to Leeuwarden a lot and came into contact with the local resistance. Her brother Dave joined the resistance after the Dutch capitulation. Esmee also joined the resistance through a friend. After a raid by the Frisian resistance on the employment office at the Zaailand in Leeuwarden on 25 July 1943, she decided to stay in Friesland for good.

The regional Knokploeg (KP) leader Krijn van den Helm initially used her as a courier, but gradually she did more and more dangerous work, such as transporting Jewish people in hiding and allied pilots to hiding places.

There are stories about van Eeghen's cool-headedness: for example, she had a German officer carry a suitcase with weapons through a checkpoint, and during a transport of a suitcase with voucher cards she casually opened the suitcase with the remark that she was a representative from a paper mill and was traveling with paper samples.

== Conflict ==
However, problems arose because van Eeghen started relationships with various members of the resistance, including Krijn van den Helm, who was reportedly married and the father of a child. Things went completely wrong when van Eeghen was ordered by the resistance to contact the SD (Sicherheitsdienst).

There are a number of sources for this: first of all Krijn van den Helm, who said that van Eeghen sought contact with German officers on his behalf. This is also confirmed by Pieter Wijbenga, a member of the KP in Leeuwarden, who said after the war that he and Krijn wanted to use van Eeghen to lure two SD men to Makkum where they would be liquidated. Due to circumstances, this plan never came to fruition.

There are also other former KP members who confirm that van Eeghen was spying on behalf of Krijn. Some say that she was trying to get information about her brother Dave who had been on a trawler in IJmuiden which had tried to cross to England. He had been arrested when it was apprehended after the journey had been betrayed. He died shortly before the liberation in Bergen-Belsen.

However, van Eeghen fell in love with a German officer, Hans Schmälzlein, Oberzahlmeister at the Verpflegungsamt in Groningen, and went to live with him, a lifestyle choice that was incompatible with being in the resistance.

== Betrayal ==
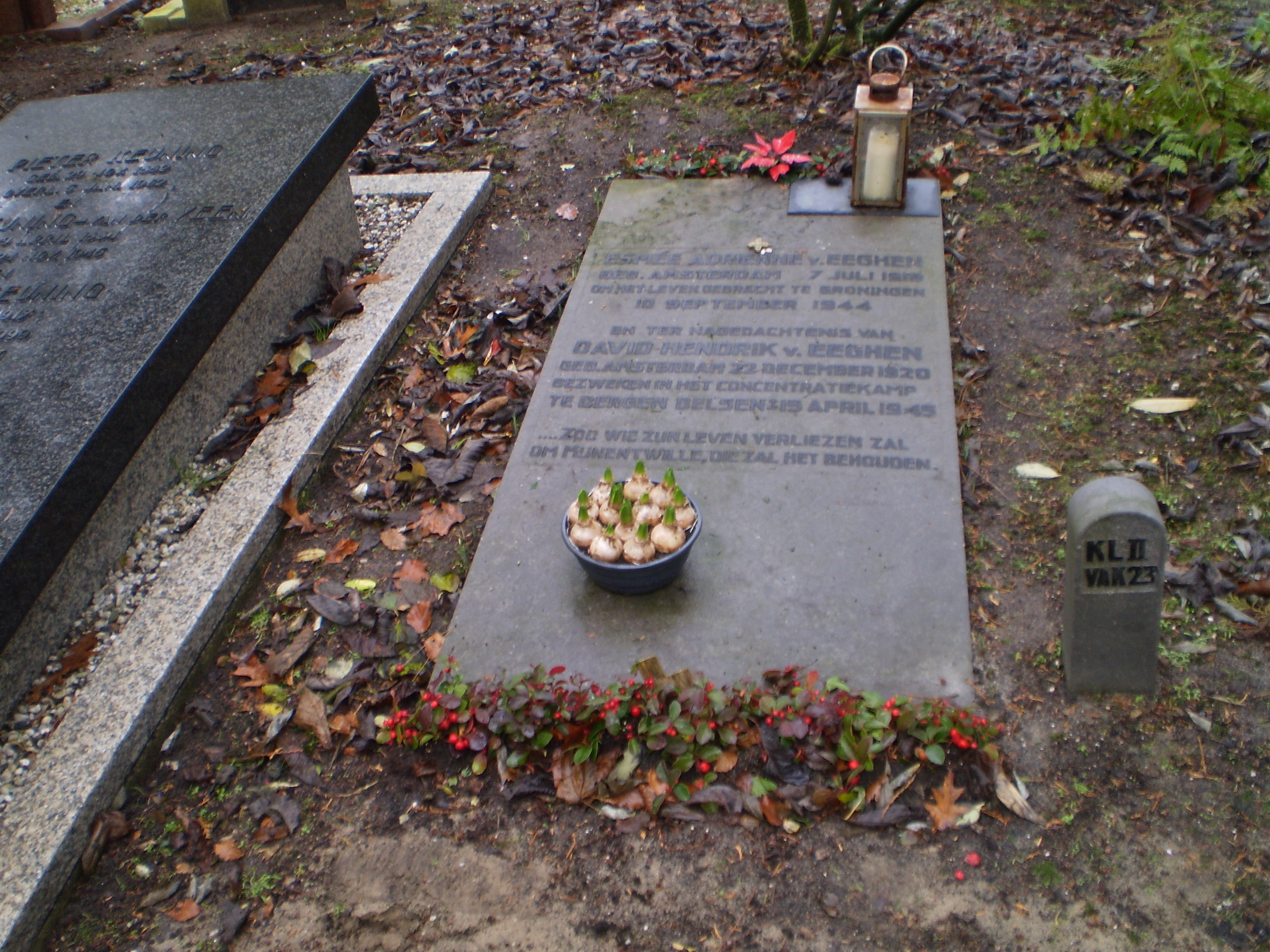
Van Eeghen's grave in Baarn

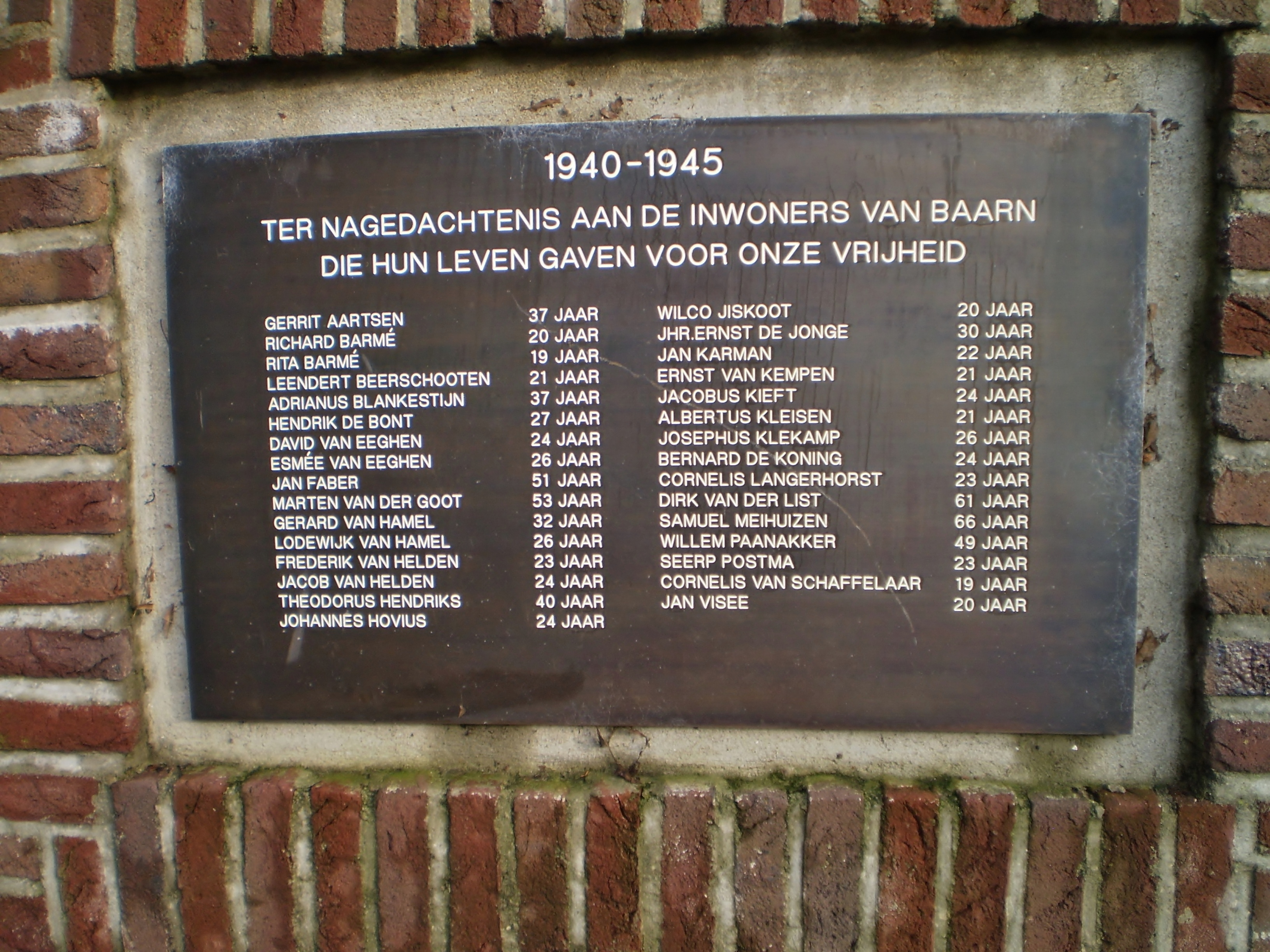
Plaque on the war memorial with the names of Esmée and David van Eeghen

On 15 July 1944, the Germans raided the resistance headquarters where they captured a number of important documents. Van Eeghen was no longer trusted by the resistance and came before a 'vehmgericht' set up by the resistance, which wanted to sentence her to death, but on the intercession of Krijn van den Helm, offered her the choice: leave Leeuwarden or be shot. In the meantime, an investigation had shown that she had not committed treason, but that the wounded resistance fighter Ben de Vries had fallen into the hands of the SD.

Van Eeghen left Leeuwarden and went into hiding with her mother. The SD was hunting her and the resistance did not trust her either. Due to her betrayal by An Jaakke, she was arrested by the SD on 8 August 1944. The SD tried to turn her, but she did not respond. It is unknown what exactly she said to the SD. On the evening of 7 September 1944, she was shot dead together with Luitje Kremer, 24 years old and a member of the KP Noord-Drenthe, by a firing squad led by Untersturmführer Ernst Knorr. The next day she was found in the Van Starkenborgh Canal. She was buried in Baarn. Her grave is also dedicated to the memory of her brother Dave, who died in the concentration camp Bergen-Belsen.

== Legacy ==
Opinions about van Eeghen have been divided for a long time. She was seen as a double agent who, as a kind of Mata Hari, would have betrayed the resistance in Leeuwarden. The death of Krijn van den Helm, who was shot dead by SD member Pieter Johan Faber in Amersfoort, has also been attributed to her. However, this is not supported by the facts. It is clear, however, that Van Eeghen's somewhat casual lifestyle and good intent were not always well understood within the resistance in Leeuwarden.

The figure Sylvia in the book Journey Through the Night by Anne de Vries is loosely based on Esmée van Eeghen. Paul Verhoeven based his heroine Rachel Stein in the film Zwartboek on Esmée van Eeghen. There is also an opera, Esmée, by composer Theo Loevendie and librettist Jan Blokker about her affair with Hans Schmälzlein, which premiered at the 1995 Holland Festival. The NCRV paid attention to Van Eeghen in the series Wonderlijke Wegen.

== Rehabilitation ==
April 12 2024 the Fries Verzetsmuseum in Leeuwarden granted rehabilitation to Van Eeghen. The museum holds it since for a fact that Esmée was on the right side. The research of Hessel de Walle gave the final push. The museum also announced that her name together with the name of Wieke Bosch (1882–1945) will be added to a monument with all the names of fallen resistance fighters.

== Biographies ==
- Meyers, Jan (2011). De oorlog van Esmée van Eeghen (in Dutch). Soesterberg: Aspekt. ISBN 9789059118461.
- Scherphuis, Ageeth; van Ommeren, Anita (1986). De oorlog van Esmée van Eeghen (in Dutch). Amsterdam: Sijthoff. ISBN 902183863X.
- De Walle, Hessel (2025). Verzetsvrouw Esmée van Eeghen van een kort leven en een lange weg naar eerherstel (in Dutch). Dokkum: Wijdemeer. ISBN 9789083468990.
