= One Way Pendulum =

One Way Pendulum may refer to:

- One Way Pendulum (play) – 1959 English play
- One Way Pendulum (film) – 1964 film, based on the above
