= Peter Yates =

English film director and producer (1929–2011)

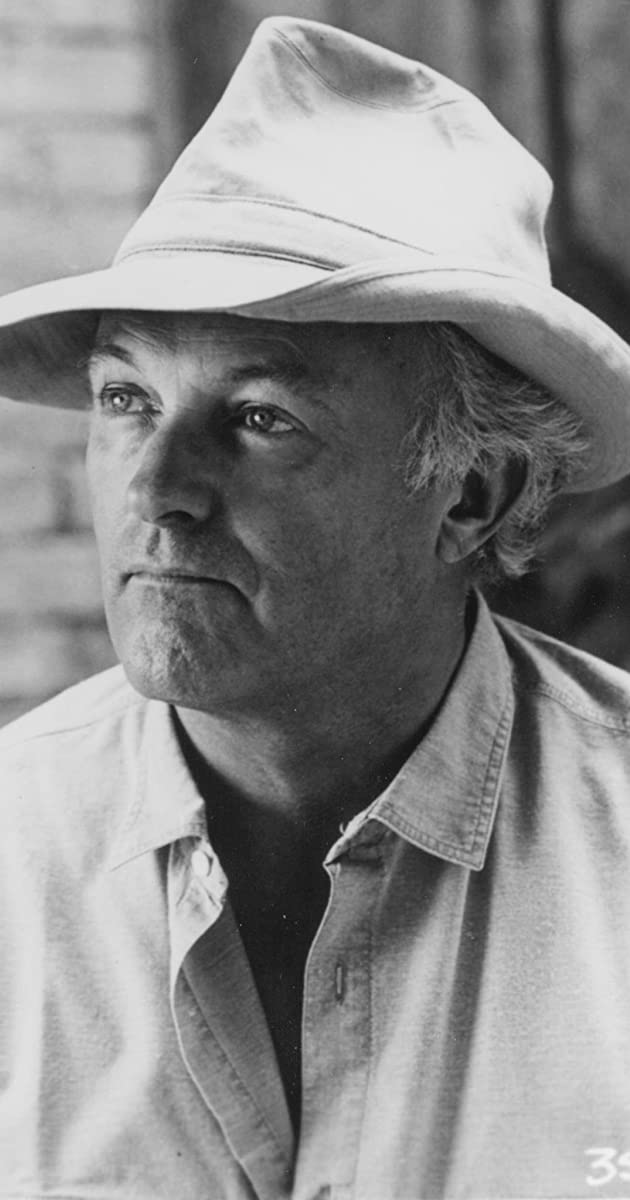
- Born: Peter James Yates; 24 July 1929; Aldershot, Hampshire, England
- Died: 9 January 2011 (aged 81); London, England
- Education: Royal Academy of Dramatic Art
- Occupations: Film director, producer
- Years active: 1958–2010
- Spouse: Virginia Pope (m. 1960)
- Children: 2

Peter James Yates (24 July 1929 – 9 January 2011) was an English film director and producer, known for making films in a wide variety of genres. He received nominations for four Academy Awards (twice for Best Director and Best Picture), three BAFTA Awards, and two Golden Globe Awards.

Originally training as an actor at the Royal Academy of Dramatic Art, Yates entered the film industry as an assistant director for top directors like Tony Richardson. After directing television programmes like The Saint and Danger Man, Yates made a breakthrough directing the heist film Robbery (1967). This led him to direct, including the Steve McQueen police thriller film Bullitt (1968), which was a major critical and commercial success.

Subsequently, Yates made films in a variety of genres, such as the romantic drama John and Mary (1969), the World War II picture Murphy's War (1971), the heist film The Hot Rock (1972), the gangster film The Friends of Eddie Coyle (1973), the coming-of-age dramedy Breaking Away (1979), the cult science fantasy film Krull (1983), and the film version of the acclaimed stage play The Dresser. In the 2000s, he returned to directing television, including Don Quixote (2000).

== Early life and education ==
Peter James Yates was born on 24 July 1929 in Aldershot, Hampshire, the son of an army officer.

He attended Charterhouse School. After graduating from the Royal Academy of Dramatic Art, he worked for some years as an actor, director, and stage manager. He directed plays in London and New York. He also spent two years as racing manager for Stirling Moss and Peter Collins.

== Career ==
=== 1958–1966 ===
In the 1950s he started in the film industry doing odd jobs such as dubbing foreign films and editing documentaries. He eventually became a leading assistant director. He was an assistant director to Mark Robson on The Inn of the Sixth Happiness (1958), Terence Young on Serious Charge (1959) with Cliff Richard, Terry Bishop on Cover Girl Killer (1959), Guy Hamilton on A Touch of Larceny (1960), Jack Cardiff on Sons and Lovers (1960), Tony Richardson on The Entertainer (1960) and A Taste of Honey (1961), J. Lee Thompson on The Guns of Navarone (1961) and José Quintero on The Roman Spring of Mrs. Stone (1961).). Through the influence of Richardson, he directed Albee's The American Dream and The Death of Bessie Smith at London's Royal Court Theatre.

Yates' first feature as director was Summer Holiday (1963), a "lightweight" vehicle for Cliff Richard. It was the second most popular movie at the British box office in 1963. Yates had seen the original Royal Court production of N.F. Simpson's play One Way Pendulum and got the job of making the film version released in 1964. It was produced by Michael Deeley. The movie was not widely seen. During the mid 1960s, Yates directed episodes of television, notably The Saint and Danger Man.

=== 1967–1984 ===
Yates' third feature as director was the heist film Robbery (1967), a fictionalised version of the Great Train Robbery of 1963 starring Stanley Baker and produced by Deeley. Robbery was a critical success in the US and led to an offer to direct Bullitt (1968), of which Bruce Weber has written, "Mr. Yates's reputation probably rests most securely on Bullitt (1968), his first American film – and indeed, on one particular scene, an extended car chase that instantly became a classic."

Yates later said, "In Hollywood back then, everyone knew a British director couldn't do action, so I think the studio had another motive in letting me come over. I think the reason they let McQueen bring me in was because if they let him have his way, they'd get him out of the studio – and out of their hair – for a while." Yates moved to New York. "A filmmaker must go where the stories are," he said. Bullitt was a huge success. Yates signed a contract with the Mirisch Company to make four films over seven years.

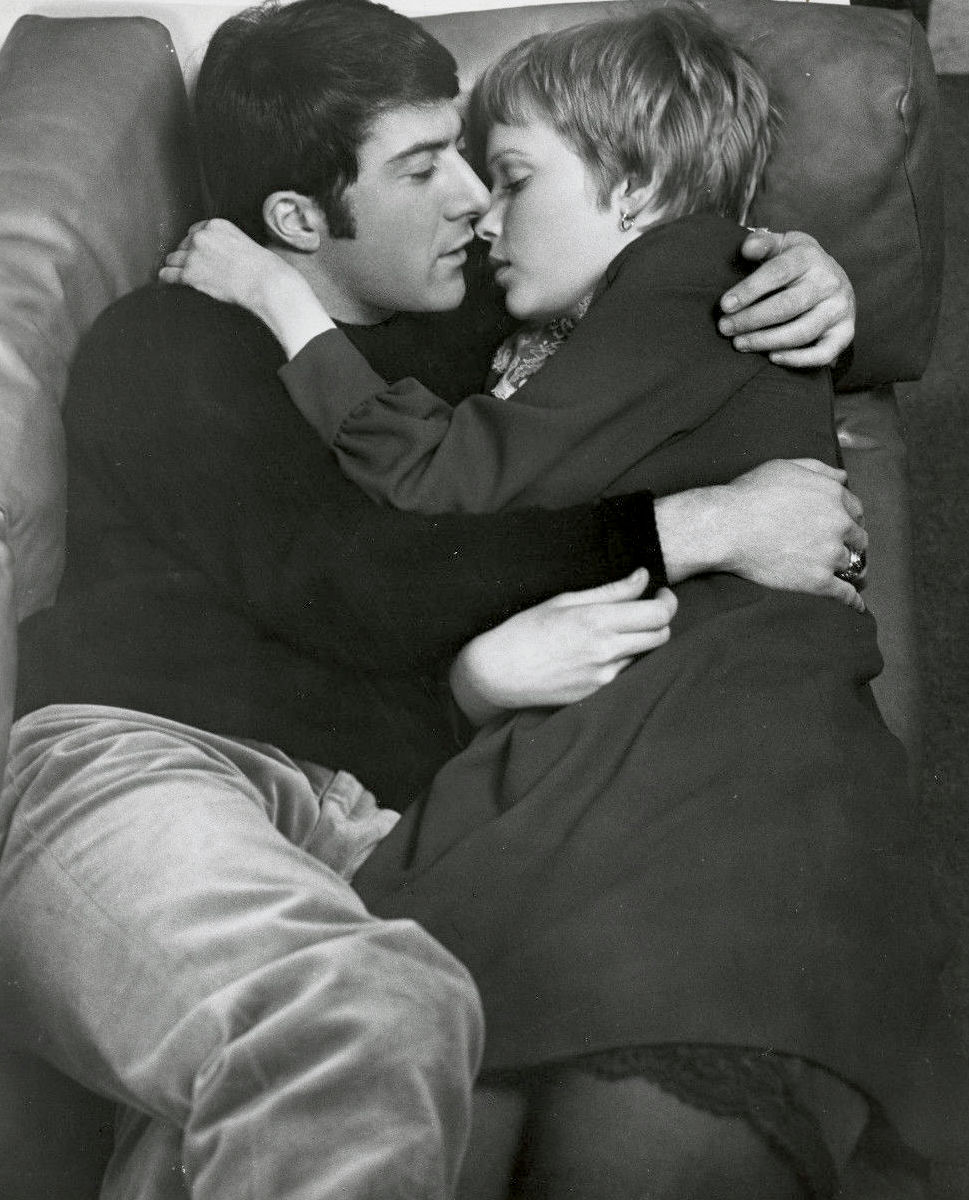
Dustin Hoffman and Mia Farrow in John and Mary (1969)

Yates followed Bullitt with a romantic comedy, John and Mary (1969) with Dustin Hoffman and Mia Farrow. "I like to change the kind of stories I do," said Yates. "If you're not careful, you get pigeonholed and sooner or later someone better will come along." In 1970, Yates said he would make Don Quixote with Richard Burton but the project stalled. Instead he did a war film with Peter O'Toole produced by Deeley, Murphy's War (1971). Yates did another heist film, The Hot Rock (1972), based on a novel by Donald Westlake starring Robert Redford from a William Goldman script. After this he was going to make The Leatherstocking Saga and Jonathan Schwartz's Almost Home but neither was made.

In 1972 he signed a four picture deal with Paramount which was to start with Deadly Edge from a Westlake novel. Yates stayed with crime with The Friends of Eddie Coyle (1973) starring Robert Mitchum. He then did two comedies: For Pete's Sake (1974) with Barbra Streisand, and Mother, Jugs & Speed (1976); he produced the latter along with writer Tom Mankiewicz. Yates had a big commercial success with the adventure film The Deep (1977), where Mankiewicz did some uncredited writing.

Yates used his clout from The Deep to raise financing for Breaking Away (1979). It was written by Steve Tesich; Yates had directed his play, The Passing Game, in New York. Yates produced and directed the film. Breaking Away was nominated for five Academy Awards, including Best Director and Best Film for Yates. It led to a short-lived TV series that Yates also produced. Yates and Tesich were reunited on the thriller Eyewitness (1981) starring William Hurt. He tried fantasy with Krull (1983), but it was not a success at the box office.

Yates also produced and directed The Dresser (1983), an adaptation of the Ronald Harwood stage play. The film received seven BAFTA and five Oscar nominations, including the BAFTA Award for Best Film and for Best Direction and the Academy Award for Best Film and for Best Director for Yates. The Dresser was also entered into the 34th Berlin International Film Festival. Along with Eddie Coyle and Breaking Away, The Dresser was one of Yates' three favourite films. "I'm ambitious in my own way," said Yates around this time. "I don't crave power. I really wouldn't want to trade places with anyone, not even Steven Spielberg. Look at what power can do to a gifted director like Robert Altman. It isn't necessarily healthy. I just want to make the movies that I want to make and, if by chance a few of them should turn out to be important or influential or successful, well, that would be an accident, wouldn't it?"

=== 1985–2004 ===
Following The Dresser, Yates next four directorial efforts proved to be unsuccessful at the box office: Eleni (1985), written by Tesich; Suspect (1987), a thriller with Cher and Dennis Quaid; The House on Carroll Street (1988), which he also produced; and An Innocent Man (1989) with Tom Selleck. In the early 1990s, after 18 years in New York, Yates moved to Los Angeles. He made Year of the Comet (1992), which was a flop despite being based on a William Goldman script, and Roommates (1995). He was an executive producer on Needful Things (1992). Yates went to Ireland to make The Run of the Country (1995) which he also produced.

In 1997 Yates returned to London. "The work was starting to close down," he admitted. "Firstly, you're supposed to be under 30, if possible. Secondly, I prefer to develop my own projects... There were a lot of teenage films around, which I wasn't right for and didn't feel connected to, and special-effects films of a kind I didn't know enough about. You have to be brought up in a computer-literate generation." He made Curtain Call (1998) with Michael Caine then made a television film of Don Quixote in 2000, with John Lithgow in the title role of the Cervantes novel. Yates' final film was A Separate Peace (2004)

== Directorial style ==
Yates was known for his versatility and "attention to detail" across a variety of genres. He said: "I think there's probably some truth in the theory that I prefer heroes who fight against adversity and make it through from being the underdog to winning".

== Death ==
Yates died from heart failure in London on 9 January 2011. He was 81 years old.

== Filmography ==
=== Film ===
- Summer Holiday (1963)
- One Way Pendulum (1964)
- Robbery (1967)
- Bullitt (1968)
- John and Mary (1969)
- Murphy's War (1971)
- The Hot Rock (1972)
- The Friends of Eddie Coyle (1973)
- For Pete's Sake (1974)
- Mother, Jugs & Speed (1976)
- The Deep (1977)
- Breaking Away (1979)
- Eyewitness (1981)
- Krull (1983)
- The Dresser (1983)
- Eleni (1985)
- Suspect (1987)
- The House on Carroll Street (1988)
- An Innocent Man (1989)
- Year of the Comet (1992)
- The Run of the Country (1995)
- Roommates (1995)
- Curtain Call (1998)

=== Television ===
- The Saint (TV series: 7 episodes 1963–1965)
- Danger Man (TV series: 7 episodes 1965–1967)
- Don Quixote (2000) (TV)
- A Separate Peace (2004) (TV)

== Awards and nominations ==
Year	Association	Category	Recipient	Result	Ref.
1979	Academy Awards	Best Picture	Breaking Away	Nominated	
1979	Academy Awards	Best Director	Breaking Away	Nominated	
1983	Academy Awards	Best Picture	The Dresser	Nominated	
1983	Academy Awards	Best Director	The Dresser	Nominated	
1969	BAFTA Awards	Best Direction	Bullitt	Nominated	
1984	BAFTA Awards	Best Film	The Dresser	Nominated	
1984	BAFTA Awards	Best Direction	The Dresser	Nominated	
1978	Golden Globe Awards	Best Director	Breaking Away	Nominated	
1983	Golden Globe Awards	Best Director	The Dresser	Nominated	
1979	Directors Guild of America Award	Outstanding Achievement in Motion Pictures	Breaking Away	Nominated	
2004	Daytime Emmy Award	Outstanding Children's Special	A Separate Peace	Nominated	

Accolades received by Yates' feature films
Year	Title	Academy Awards		BAFTA Film Awards		Golden Globe Awards	
Year	Title	Nominations	Wins	Nominations	Wins	Nominations	Wins
1968	Bullitt	2	1	5			
1969	John and Mary			2	1	3	
1972	The Hot Rock	1					
1977	The Deep	1		1		1	
1979	Breaking Away	5	1	1	1	4	1
1983	The Dresser	5		7		5	1
1995	Roommates	1					
Total		15	2	16	2	13	2

== See also ==
- List of Academy Award winners and nominees from Great Britain
