= Off the map =

Off the map may refer to:

- Off the Map (video), 2001 video of concerts by American band Red Hot Chili Peppers
- Off the Map (film), an American drama film released in 2003
- Off the Map (TV series), an American drama series produced during 2011
- Off the Map, American collection of short stories by Daniel Wallace (author)
- "Off the Map", a song by SoFaygo
- "Off the Map", a song by Bill Wurtz

== See also ==
- A Bit Off the Map, and Other Stories, a collection of prose by English author Angus Wilson
