= Alison Leggatt =

English character actress (1904–1990)

- Photo by Bassano Ltd,1927
- Born: Alison Joy Leggatt; 7 February 1904; Kensington, London, England
- Died: 15 July 1990 (aged 86); London, England
- Education: Royal Central School of Speech and Drama
- Occupation: Actress

Alison Joy Leggatt (7 February 1904 – 15 July 1990) was an English character actress.

== Career ==
Born in the Kensington district of London, Leggatt trained under Elsie Fogerty at the Central School of Speech and Drama, then based in the Royal Albert Hall, London. Leggatt spent the early part of her career primarily on the stage. Her performance in Miles Malleson's The Fanatics in 1927 launched her, according to The New York Times, as "one of the most promising theatrical newcomers of her generation". Other stage work included the original 1931 Drury Lane production of Cavalcade by Noël Coward. Her first major film credit was as Aunt Sylvia in This Happy Breed (1944), Noël Coward's homage to the British working class. She was known for playing a variety of disapproving in-laws, motherly landladies, nosy neighbours and helpful housekeepers. She played opposite Petula Clark three times, in Here Come the Huggetts (1948), The Card (1952) and Goodbye, Mr. Chips (1969). In the John Schlesinger film version of Far from the Madding Crowd (1967) she played Mrs Hurst; her final screen appearance was in the Sherlock Holmes film The Seven-Per-Cent Solution (1976).

Additional theatre work included appearances at Stratford, as well as the original West End productions of Bernard Shaw's Geneva in 1938; T.S. Eliot's The Cocktail Party and The Confidential Clerk in 1950 and 1954; John Osborne's Epitaph for George Dillon in 1958 (and its Broadway transfer); Harold Pinter's A Slight Ache in 1961; and N. F. Simpson's One Way Pendulum in 1959 (and its 1964 film version).

Leggatt's television credits include Jonathan Miller’s production of Alice’s Adventures in Wonderland (1966) (as the Queen of Hearts), the 1975 mini-series Edward the Seventh, in which she portrayed Queen Victoria's mother, the Duchess of Kent, and a memorable turn in an episode of the prison drama series Within These Walls (1978), where she played Alice Drewett, the narcissistic sister of an inmate who is released into her 'care'.

== Death ==
Alison Leggatt died of natural causes in London, aged 86.

== Selected filmography ==
- Nine till Six (1932) as Freda
- This Happy Breed (1944) as Aunt Sylvia
- Waterloo Road (1945) as Ruby
- It's Hard to Be Good (1948) as Mrs. Buck
- Here Come the Huggetts (1948) as Miss Perks
- A Boy, a Girl and a Bike (1949) as Mrs. Howarth
- Marry Me! (1949) as Miss Beamish
- The Miniver Story (1950) as Mrs. Foley (uncredited)
- Encore (1951) as Freda Ramsay (segment "The Ant and the Grasshopper")
- The Card (1952) as Mrs. Cotterill (uncredited)
- Noose for a Lady (1953) as Mrs. Langdon-Humphries
- Touch and Go (1955) as Alice Fairbright
- Woman Possessed (1958) as Emma
- Never Take Sweets from a Stranger (1960) as Martha
- Goodbye Again (1961) as Alice
- The Day of the Triffids (1962) as Miss Coker
- Nothing but the Best (1964) as Mrs. Brewster
- One Way Pendulum (1964) as Mrs. Groomkirby
- Far from the Madding Crowd (1967) as Mrs. Hurst
- Goodbye, Mr. Chips (1969) as Headmaster's Wife
- The Hireling (1973)
- Edward The Seventh (1975) as Princess Victoria, Duchess of Kent
- The Seven-Per-Cent Solution (1976) as Mrs. Hudson
