= Jack McGurk =

Jonathon Prudence "Jack" McGurk is a fictional boy detective in a series of novels by E. W. Hildick.

== Background ==
The group of pre-teen detectives is led by 10-year-old Jack P. McGurk. Members of the McGurk Detective Agency included Joey Rockaway, Willie "The Nose" Sandowsky, Wanda Greig, Gerald "Brains" Bellingham, and later, Mari Yoshimura. The series started with The Nose Knows in 1974 (ISBN 0448057212) and continued through 24 volumes to the final adventure The Case of the Wiggling Wig in 1996 (ISBN 0689800827).

== Books ==
- The Nose Knows (1974)
- Dolls in Danger (1974; a.k.a. "Deadline for McGurk")
- The Case of the Condemned Cat (1975)
- The Menaced Midget (1975)
- The Case of the Nervous Newsboy (1976)
- The Great Rabbit Robbery (1976; a.k.a. "The Great Rabbit Rip-Off")
- The Case of the Invisible Dog (1977)
- The Case of the Secret Scribbler (1978)
- The Case of the Phantom Frog (1979)
- The Case of the Treetop Treasure (1980)
- The Case of the Snowbound Spy (1980)
- The Case of the Bashful Bank Robber (1981)
- The Case of the Four Flying Fingers (1981)
- McGurk Gets Good and Mad (1982)
- The Case of the Felon's Fiddle (1982)
- The Case of the Slingshot Sniper (1983)
- The Case of the Vanishing Ventriloquist (1985)
- The Case of the Muttering Mummy (1986)
- The Case of the Wandering Weathervanes (1988)
- The Case of the Purloined Parrot (1990)
- The Case of the Desperate Drummer (1993)
- The Case of the Fantastic Footprints (1994)
- The Case of the Absent Author (1995)
- The Case of the Wiggling Wig (1996)
