= The Middle Age of Mrs Eliot =

1958 novel by Angus Wilson

- First edition
- Author: Angus Wilson
- Language: English
- Publisher: Secker and Warburg
- Publication date: November 1958
- Publication place: United Kingdom
- Media type: Print (Hardback & Paperback)
- Pages: 430pp
- ISBN: 0-436-57505-1
- OCLC: 256140343

The Middle Age of Mrs Eliot is a novel by Angus Wilson, first published in 1958. It won the James Tait Black Memorial Prize for that year, and has been regularly reprinted ever since.

It describes the fortunes of Meg Eliot, a happy and active woman, the wife of a barrister, who finds herself a widow in reduced circumstances after the shocking murder of her husband abroad.

Her attempts to rebuild her life are placed in contrast with the self-isolation of her brother, David, who lives with his dying partner Gordon at a commercial nursery in Sussex.

Wilson conceived the idea for the story in September 1957, while visiting Thailand, which is possibly the model for the fictional country of Badai.

The first edition dust jacket was designed by Michael Ayrton.

== Characters ==
- Meg Eliot
- Bill Eliot, her husband
- David Parker, her brother
- The "lame ducks"
  - Polly Robson
  - Lady Pirie
  - Jill Stokes
- Gordon Paget, David's partner
- Else Bode
- Mrs Paget, Gordon's mother
- Lady Pirie
- Michael Grant-Pritchard, a Tory MP
- Fred Rogerson
