= Hemlock and After =

1952 novel by Angus Wilson

First UK edition (publ. Secker & Warburg) Cover art by Ronald Searle

Hemlock and After is a 1952 novel by British writer Angus Wilson; it was his first published novel after a series of short stories. The novel offers a candid portrayal of gay life in post-World War II England.

== Plot introduction ==
Bernard Sands, a prominent writer who has been given financial aid to start a writer's colony at Vardon Hall, faces a failing marriage, attempts to come to grips with his homosexuality and lives next door to a procuress for paedophiles.

== Characters in Hemlock and After ==
- Bernard Sands, the protagonist; a homosexual
- Ella, Bernard's wife
- Elizabeth, the Sandses' daughter
- James, the Sandses' son
- Charles, a friend of Bernard; a senior civil servant
- Mrs Curry, the Sands's neighbour; a procuress for pedophiles
- Hubert Rose, an architect and a pedophile

== References to other works ==
- Angus Wilson said in an interview that the ending of the novel was Dickensian.

== Trivia ==
The novel was written in only four weeks.
