= Robert Halmi =

Hungarian-born American film producer (1924–2014)

Robert Halmi (Sr.) (Hungarian: Halmi Róbert; January 22, 1924 – July 30, 2014) was a Hungarian-born producer of movies and mini-series for television.

== Early life ==
Robert Halmi was born in Budapest on January 22, 1924. His father, Béla Halmi, was a photographer and brought up his son after he divorced while Robert was young. He had photographic commissions with the Habsburg royal family and the Vatican. Consequently, Robert was familiar with photographic processes from an early age.

== Photographer ==
A freedom fighter for Hungary during the Second World War, Halmi was jailed by the Nazis. After the war, in 1946, he graduated in economics from the University of Budapest and, with his knowledge of English, got work assisting and translating for a Time-Life reporter in Budapest. He took up photography, freelancing for American newspapers, but this brought him under suspicion from the Communist government and was briefly jailed again. On release he worked for Radio Free Europe in Austria as a broadcaster. There, he photographed black-shrouded women mourners, a picture later selected by Edward Steichen for MoMA's world-touring The Family of Man exhibition.

Halmi went to the United States in 1950, arriving in New York, and after establishing himself as a commercial photographer he approached LIFE and other magazines, including Sports Illustrated, and was commissioned for adventure and travel stories, often participating in the events he would document, including an African road rally for a story "The Wildest Auto Ride on Earth", for True magazine, he photographed Sam Snead and the Shah of Iran.

== Film producer ==
After Life ceased weekly publication, Halmi made documentaries for television. From his experience covering a LIFE story on a 1962 visit with his 9-year-old stepson Kevin Gorman to a Maasai tribe in Kenya, he conceived his first feature film, Visit to a Chief's Son, released in 1974 and starring Richard Mulligan, Johnny Sekka, John Philip Hogdon and Jesse Kinaru.

In 1979 with his son Robert, Halmi started a production company, RHI Entertainment, (later Sonar Entertainment), and adapted literary classics for television including The Odyssey (1997), Alice in Wonderland (1999), Moby Dick (1997) and Gulliver's Travels (1996) and continued as a producer of television movies and miniseries.

The father-son team of Robert Halmi Sr. and Robert Halmi Jr. also are known for many Hallmark Productions which they co-produced or co-directed, including films like "You Lucky Dog" in 2010.

Still working at 90, he died on July 30, 2014, in Manhattan, survived by son Robert Jr., and his fifth wife, Caroline Gray. Robert Halmi, Sr.'s other survivors included another son, Bill; his stepson, Kevin Gorman; a step-daughter, Kim Sampson; and two sisters, Julie Costello and Jorgie Lask.

== Filmography ==
- The Night They Saved Christmas (1984)
- The Yearling (1994)
- Scarlett (1994)
- Kidnapped (1995)
- Gulliver's Travels (1996)
- The Odyssey (1997)
- Moby Dick (1998)
- Merlin (1998)
- Alice in Wonderland (1999)
- Animal Farm (1999)
- A Christmas Carol (1999)
- Cleopatra (1999)
- Don Quixote (2000)
- Arabian Nights (2000)
- The Prince and the Pauper (2000)
- A Christmas Carol (2004)
- The Ten Commandments (2006)
- Terry Pratchett's Hogfather (2006)
- Tin Man (2007)
- The Colour of Magic (2008)
- Neverland (2011)
- Treasure Island (2012)

== Books written and/or illustrated by Robert Halmi ==
- Halmi, Robert (1956), Guide to photographing women, Greenberg
- Halmi, Robert (1959), Sports cars of the world, Sports Car Pr
- Halmi, Robert (1969). In the wilds of Africa. Scholastic Book Services, New York.
- Halmi, Robert (1969), Into your hand are they delivered, Scholastic-Tab Publications
- Halmi, Robert (1975), Zoos of the world, Four Winds Press, ISBN 978-0-590-07247-2
- Halmi, Robert (2015), American dreamer: my story of survival, adventure, and success, Lyons Press Guilford, Connecticut, ISBN 978-1-4930-0908-4
