= Anglo-Saxon Attitudes =

Novel by Angus Wilson

- First edition
- Author: Angus Wilson
- Cover artist: Ronald Searle
- Language: English
- Publisher: Secker & Warburg
- Publication date: 1956
- Publication place: United Kingdom
- Media type: Print (Hardback & Paperback)

Anglo-Saxon Attitudes is a satirical novel by Angus Wilson, published in 1956. It was Wilson's most popular book, and many consider it his best work.

== Plot summary ==
The novel deals with the significance of two connected events that happened on the same day, long before the opening of the novel. The first was the excavation of an ancient and valuable archaeological idol, a phallic figure unearthed from the tomb of an Anglo-Saxon bishop Eorpwald, known as the "Melpham excavation". Gerald has long been haunted by a drunken revelation by his friend Gilbert, who was involved with this excavation, that the whole thing was a hoax perpetrated to embarrass Gilbert's father. Gilbert told Gerald that he put the idol there. Gerald, while feeling that his friend was telling the truth, pushed the matter to the back of his mind and tried to forget about it. He now feels ashamed that he, a history professor, has never had the courage to try to resolve the matter one way or another.

The second is that Gerald Middleton fell in love with Dollie, Gilbert's fiancée, and had an affair with her when his friend went off to fight in World War I. When Gilbert was killed at the front, Dollie refused to marry Gerald. He ended up marrying a Scandinavian woman named Inge but continued his affair with Dollie, who became an alcoholic. Gerald and Inge later separated.

Anglo-Saxon Attitudes is full of side-plots and coincidences and contains a host of eccentric characters. Some of these characters are Gerald's family. Robin, his eldest son, is a womaniser who cannot decide whether to leave his wife or his mistress. Kay has an unhappy marriage and a deeply embittered view of her father, whom she appears to blame for everything that has gone wrong in her life, including her withered hand (which was actually caused by her mother). Gerald's estranged wife, Inge, is a grotesquely deluded woman who cannot bring herself to acknowledge her younger son John's homosexuality or her daughter's physical disability.

Gerald feels responsible for Dollie's plight and for those of his children. He feels that the knowledge of his complicity over the Melpham affair has drained his morale and made him withdrawn and indecisive. The novel begins with him resolving to make good the 'bloody shameful waste' of his life, by investigating the Melpham affair and making peace with Dollie. He also attempts to develop better relationships with his grown-up children and with Inge.

By the novel's end, Gerald achieves a measure of peace with his past. He persuades Dollie to come forward with a letter from Gilbert's father's colleague, Canon Portway, proving that the Melpham incident was a hoax; then he and Dollie begin a platonic friendship. He gives up on achieving good relations with his family.

== Sources of inspiration ==
The theme of the novel was suggested to Wilson by archaeological disputes, notably the Piltdown Man hoax (1908–1912) and an accusation that the Elgin Marbles had been mishandled by the British Museum, later substantiated. The book alludes to the Sutton Hoo ship-burial discovery of 1939, in a country-house setting near Woodbridge, Suffolk. The Melpham discovery is similarly set among the 'East Folk' on the east coast of England. Eorpwald (also the name of the Melpham bishop) is in reality the unique Anglo-Saxon name of the successor of Raedwald, who was popularly thought to have been buried in the famous ship. That discovery, essentially a pagan style of burial in which Christian artefacts were included, raised many disputes among academics (as Angus Wilson knew).

== Television adaptation ==
The novel was made into a three-part television mini-series in 1992 by the Thames Television subsidiary Euston Films. The screenplay was written by Andrew Davies and featured Richard Johnson in the role of Gerald Middleton. Tara Fitzgerald played a major supporting role as the young Dollie and there were appearances by a 16-year-old Kate Winslet, and by Daniel Craig as Gilbert. The film won the BAFTA TV Award for Best Drama Serial; Davies and Johnson also won awards from the Writers' Guild of Great Britain and the Broadcasting Press Guild respectively. The series is available on DVD in both the UK and USA.

== The phrase "Anglo-Saxon attitudes" ==
"Anglo-Saxon attitudes" is a phrase originated by Lewis Carroll in Through the Looking-Glass (1871):

"All this was lost on Alice, who was still looking intently along the road, shading her eyes with one hand. 'I see somebody now!' she exclaimed at last. 'But he's coming very slowly—and what curious attitudes he goes into!'

(For the Messenger kept skipping up and down, and wriggling like an eel, as he came along, with his great hands spread out like fans on each side.)

'Not at all,' said the King. 'He's an Anglo-Saxon Messenger—and those are Anglo-Saxon attitudes. He only does them when he's happy.'"

Wilson uses part of this quotation at the front of his novel. Lewis Carroll is referring to a ninth- to eleventh-century style in English drawing, in which the figures are shown in swaying positions with the palms held out in exaggerated positions.

== Other works ==
Anglo-Saxon Attitudes has also been used as the title of several subsequent literary works.

John Maddocks' review of Carleton S. Coon's The Origin of Races for the first issue of New York Review of Books in February 1963, was headed "Anglo-Saxon Attitudes". History Today titled its report of the opening of a new museum at Canterbury in Kent, on the site of St Augustine's Abbey, "Anglo-Saxon Attitudes".

Anglo-Saxon Attitudes was also the name of an historical conference "in pursuit of the English" to define the evolution of the English "cultural self-image" held at the University of Salford on 9–11 July 1999.
