= Muna Jabbur =

Lebanese novelist

Muna Jabbur (Arabic: منى جبر, 1942–1964) was a Lebanese novelist. Alongside her contemporary Layla Balabakki, she was regarded as one of the pioneering vanguards shaping the literary culture scene of Beirut in the 1960s.

Born in the Akkar District of Lebanon, Jabbur authored the novel Fatah tafiha (Silly Girl) in 1962. The book explores the life of a young woman called Nada who experiences depression due to her father's attempts to indoctrinate her into traditional womanhood, against the backdrop of a modernizing Beirut. In 1964, she committed suicide at the age of 22. Her second novel al-Ghirban wa-l-musub al-bayda (The Ravens and the White Gowns') was published posthumously in 1966.
