= Don Quixote (2000 film) =

- Based on: Don Quixote by Miguel de Cervantes
- Screenplay by: John Mortimer
- Directed by: Peter Yates
- Starring: John Lithgow; Bob Hoskins; Isabella Rossellini; Lambert Wilson
- Music by: Richard Hartley
- Country of origin: United States
- Original language: English

Production
- Producers: Dyson Lovell; Robert Halmi Sr.
- Cinematography: David Connell
- Running time: 138 minutes
- Budget: $15 million

Original release
- Network: TNT
- Release: April 9, 2000

Don Quixote is a 2000 television film produced by Hallmark Entertainment and aired on TNT on April 9, 2000. It was directed by Peter Yates, and the teleplay, by John Mortimer, was adapted from Miguel de Cervantes' novel Don Quixote. The film was shown in three parts in Europe but in one installment in the U.S.

The film was produced by Dyson Lovell, with Robert Halmi Sr. and John Lithgow as executive producers and cinematography by David Connell. The original music is by Richard Hartley. The film stars Lithgow as Don Quixote de La Mancha (Quixote's real name is Alonso Quijano), and Bob Hoskins as Sancho Panza, and features Isabella Rossellini, Vanessa Williams, Lambert Wilson, Amelia Warner, Tony Haygarth, Peter Eyre, Lilo Baur, James Purefoy, and Trevor Peacock.

== Production ==
Yates had not worked in television since the 1960s but was persuaded to try by his friend John Frankenheimer. "He said I should do some TV, that it could be fun as long as you take the same care as you do with feature films--get good actors, do something that's going to be special. It was good advice."

He discovered a friend of his, John Mortimer, had just written a script of Don Quixote and offered it to Yates to read. "I did, and I really liked it," said Yates. "When my agent established no director was attached, I went to see [producer] Robert Halmi and said I'd like to make 'Quixote'." By coincidence, Yates had been attached in the 1970s to direct a film version of Don Quixote, based on a screenplay by Waldo Salt, which would have starred Richard Burton in the lead and Peter O'Toole as Sancho Panza; the film was never produced.

== Home media ==
Of all the Hallmark adaptations of novels which premiered on Turner Network Television, only Don Quixote is still unavailable on a U.S. DVD. The film was made in English and released on VHS shortly after it was telecast in the U.S. and a Region 2 DVD (PAL) was released by Hallmark in 2002, there is also a dubbed-into-Spanish version distributed by Divisa Home Video (Spain), and a DVD available with English or Russian-dubbed voices, with subtitles in Estonian, Latvian, Lithuanian, and Russian.

== Awards and nominations ==
The film was nominated for three Primetime Emmys, and John Lithgow was nominated for a Screen Actors Guild Award.

== See also ==
- List of American films of 2000
