= Charley's Grants =

1970 British TV comedy series

- Genre: Sitcom
- Written by: N. F. Simpson; John Fortune; John Wells
- Country of origin: United Kingdom
- Original language: English
- No. of series: 1
- No. of episodes: 6

Production
- Producer: Ian MacNaughton

Original release
- Network: BBC2
- Release: 22 March – 26 April 1970

Charley's Grants is a British television comedy first broadcast in 1970 on BBC2. It was written by N. F. Simpson, John Fortune, and John Wells and produced by Ian MacNaughton (who produced Monty Python's Flying Circus).

Cast included Willoughby Goddard, Hattie Jacques, Diana King, Aubrey Morris and Keith Smith. The series is considered a lost television broadcast, with all six episodes missing.
