= A Bit Off the Map =

1957 collection of short stories by Angus Wilson

A Bit Off the Map, and Other Stories
- First edition (publ. Secker & Warburg)
- Author: Angus Wilson
- Language: English
- Publication date: 1957

A Bit Off the Map, and Other Stories is a 1957 collection of eight short stories written by Angus Wilson.

== Background ==
The book is Wilson's third collection of short stories. It takes its title from the first story included in the collection.

== Stories ==
The stories in A Bit Off the Map include "A Flat Country Christmas", "Once A Lady", and "More Friend Than Lodger". Wilson reveals the motives behind the pompous behaviour of his characters. The stories intersperse the ironic, as a way of deflating the premises of the facades the characters have erected.

== Characters ==
Marina MacKay, of Washington University in St. Louis, says the characters in the collection, "are struggling to find their place on England's post-war map." She takes particular note of Kennie, the hero of "A Bit Off the Map." She calls him "a mentally subnormal Teddy boy who drifts around cafes, infatuated with an untalented, artistic crowd."

== Reception ==
Critical reception of the story was generally quite positive. Reviewing the collection in the year of its release, Time magazine called it "brilliantly readable", and noted that "there is no denying the sneering precision of his observations."
