= I Live =

1958 novel by Laila Baalbaki

I live
- Author: Laila Baalbaki
- Language: Arabic
- Publication date: 1958
- Publication place: Lebanon

I Live (also translated as I Survive) (Arabic: أنا أحيا) is the first novel by the Lebanese writer Laila Baalbakki. It was first published in 1958 and was chosen as number seventeen of the 105 best Arabic novels of the 20th century by the Arab Writers Union. Its publication marked the beginning of a period in which many novels by Lebanese women appeared, and it dealt with the lives of young Arab women finding new ways of living in defiance of traditional gender roles. The novel was banned for immorality in Lebanon in the same year that it was published, and together with Baalbekki's second novel A Spaceship of Tenderness to the Moon it led to the author going to court to defend herself against a charge of degrading public morals.

== Reception ==
Highlighting some of the common themes the work shares with that of other Lebanese women writers, Aghacy notes the importance of the café as a setting offering relative freedom to women, and a strong sense of anger and resentment against the figure of the father.

I Live, with its powerful protest against patriarchy and demand for individual liberty, inspired Hanan al-Shaykh to write.

I Live has been translated into French (Je vis! Seuil, 1958) and German (Ich lebe, Lenos 1994), but is not available in English.
