= Zaim Topčić =

Yugoslav and Bosnian writer

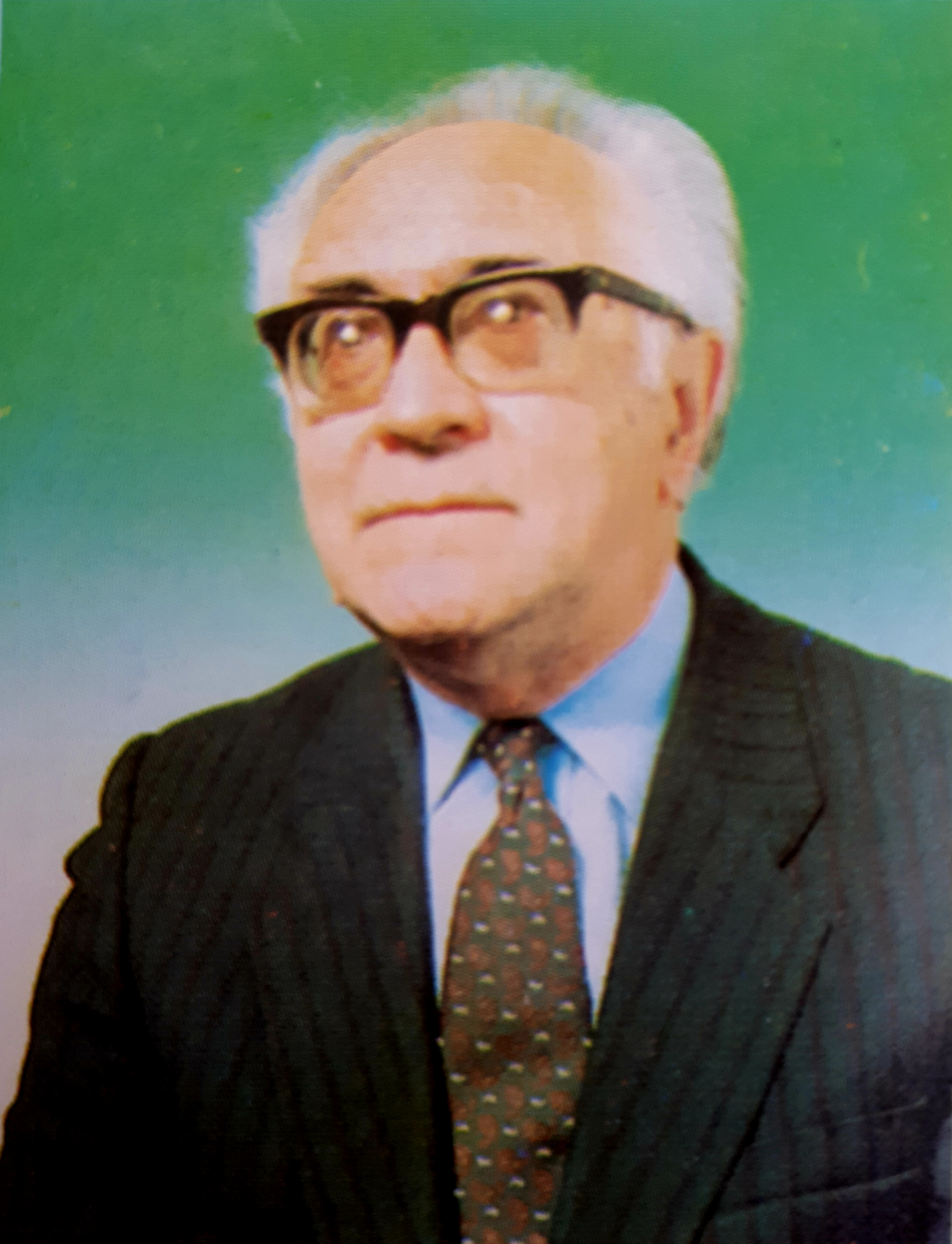
- Born: 28 February 1920; Glamoč, Kingdom of Yugoslavia (modern Bosnia Herzegovina)
- Died: 15 July 1990 (aged 70); Sarajevo, SR Bosnia and Herzegovina, SFR Yugoslavia
- Occupation: Writer
- Spouse: Naila Selimić
- Children: 2, including Zlatko
- Writing career
- Notable awards: The Annual Award of the Association of Writers of Bosnia and Herzegovina; Lump of Sun (1958); Black Snows (1962)

Signature
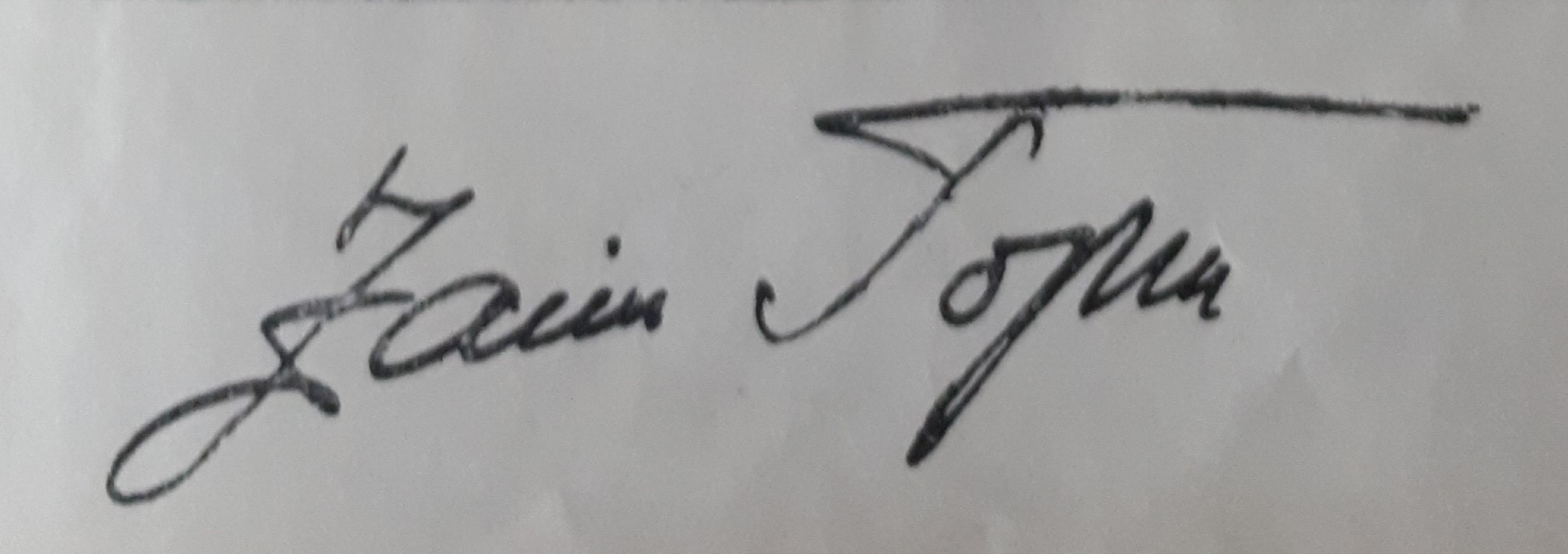

Zaim Topčić (28 February 1920 – 15 July 1990) was a Bosnian writer of novels. He twice won the Annual Award of the Association of Writers of Bosnia and Herzegovina, for the novels Lump of Sun and Black Snows (his son Zlatko Topčić is also a double winner of this award).

== Early life and family ==
Topčić was born in Glamoč to a Bosniak family on 28 February 1920 and lived most of his life in Sarajevo. His wife Naila was a member of the Selimić family (her grandfather was a municipal councilor, landowner, benefactor and philanthropist Zaim-beg Selimić, who was the owner of the Kravica waterfall).

He graduated from the Faculty of Economics of the University of Belgrade.

== Career ==
Topčić actively participated in World War II in Yugoslavia from the beginning of 1941, on the Partisans side. After liberation he was the editor of Sarajevo radio station. Topčić was the secretary general of the Association of Writers of Bosnia and Herzegovina (then Udruženje književnika Bosne i Hercegovine, now Društvo pisaca Bosne i Hercegovine, whose founder, secretary general, from 1993 to 2001, and a board member, from 2006 to 2010, was his son Zlatko).

He is the author of the important historical novel Country of Heretics. Professor Enes Duraković has included it in the edition of the 100 books of Bosniak literature. He has published a collections of stories Above the Abyss and Towards the Day; novels Lump of Sun, Black Snows, Sea Between Poplars, Country of Heretics, Obtained World, Man Hunt Jasenovac and Valter, Matoš; drama Shadows of Autumn and travelogues Panorama of Our Time.

Topčić was a member of the Association of Writers of Bosnia and Herzegovina and the Royal Institute of International Affairs (Chatham House). His works have been translated into several languages.

== Personal life ==
He lived in Sarajevo with his wife Naila Selimić, son Zlatko and daughter Vesna. As a communist, during World War II, he was trapped in the Jasenovac concentration camp in 1943. One street in Ilidža is called Street Zaim Topčić.

== Bibliography ==
=== Collections of stories ===
- Above the Abyss, 1952
- Towards the Day, 1955

=== Novels ===
- Lump of Sun (Grumen sunca, 1958)
- Black Snows (Crni snjegovi, 1962)
- Sea Between Poplars (More među jablanima, 1966)
- Country of Heretics (Zemlja heretika, 1972)
- Obtained World (Dobijeni svijet, 1979)
- Man Hunt Jasenovac (Ljudolovka Jasenovac, 1985)
- Valter, Matoš, 1991 (published posthumously)

=== Dramas ===
- Shadows of Autumn

=== Travelogues ===
- Panorama of Our Time, 1958

== Awards ==
- The Annual Award of the Association of Writers of Bosnia and Herzegovina for novel Lump of Sun, 1958
- The Annual Award of the Association of Writers of Bosnia and Herzegovina for novel Black Snows, 1962
- 27 July Award of Bosnia and Herzegovina

== See also ==
- List of Bosnian and Herzegovinian people
- List of Bosniak writers
- List of Sarajevans
- List of Bosniaks
