= Margaret Smith (poet) =

American poet

Margaret D. Smith (born 1958) is an American writer, poet, musician, and artist. Her name is now Margaret Kellermann, active since 2011.

Smith (Kellermann) was born in Norfolk, Virginia, United States. Her books of fiction, poetry and nonfiction, published under her name Margaret D. Smith, include Barn Swallow (2006), The Seed in Me (2001), Made With Love (1998), A Holy Struggle: Unspoken Thoughts of Hopkins (1992, 1994), Journal Keeper (1992, 1993), and The Rose and the Pearl coauthored by Rose Reynoldson (1982).

She is a frequent guest lecturer on a variety of topics: poet Gerard Manley Hopkins, writing for adults and children, journal keeping as a spiritual practice, and the combination of the arts, such as poetry and visual art. Her work in collage using found pieces has been shown in galleries in Seattle and elsewhere in the Pacific Northwest. Her recent art—abstract seascapes on canvas—appears in galleries throughout Northern California.

In a 2007 interview with the author, Jeffrey Overstreet calls her "one of the most inspiring and creative artists I know". He goes on to say, "As far as I'm concerned, Margaret's poetry and perspective qualify her as part of an elite community of Christians who have extraordinary insight into matters of faith and art. She's carrying on the tradition of [Kathleen] Norris, [Annie] Dillard, [Luci] Shaw, [Frederick] Buechner, [Madeleine] L'Engle, [Flannery] O’Connor, [Dorothy] Sayers, [C.S.] Lewis, and [George] MacDonald."

Two of the authors mentioned by Overstreet were part of "A Holy Struggle": Shaw and L'Engle. In 1991, Shaw, whose publishing company had already accepted the book manuscript, financed a research trip to England, Ireland and Wales, where she and Smith retraced the path of Hopkins, and Shaw took a series of black-and-white photographs that later illustrated the book. After Shaw and Smith visited L'Engle in her salon in Manhattan, L'Engle wrote a review of the manuscript: "I have long loved Hopkins, and Margaret has caught the spirit of the poet." The National Book Award winner, Walter Wangerin, wrote the foreword, writing about the author, the work and the world in general: "Pay attention!"

As Margaret Kellermann, the author was the 2016 recipient of the Ruth Marcus Memorial Writing Scholarship through the Humboldt Area Foundation. The scholarship allowed her to complete her book manuscript, Annie California, a novel in journal form for middle-grade readers. The book stars young Annie, a smart girl who happens to be homeless, rather than the other way around. Annie writes in her journal about a dysfunctional family road trip across the country.
