= Drums and Colours =

Drums and Colours: An Epic Drama is a play by Derek Walcott. It was commissioned by the University of the West Indies for the opening of the first (and only) opening session of the Federal Parliament of the West Indies Federation on 23 April 1958, when the play was first performed in Port-of-Spain, Trinidad, in an open-air production involving actors and personnel from other parts of the Caribbean as part of a regional arts festival to celebrate the new (and short-lived) West Indies Federation. Drums and Colours was published in a special issue of Caribbean Quarterly in 1961.
