= The Hole (play) =

1958 play by N.F. Simpson

The Hole is an absurdist play published in 1958, written by N.F. Simpson, a British playwright associated with the Theatre of the Absurd.

== Plot ==
"The hole is in the road. In the depths of it workmen are working. At the top, a man with a camp stool, vacuum flask, haversack, and other necessities for a long vigil is forming the nucleus of a queue. From time to time curious folk gather round and wonder what is going on below. Each gazes into the hole and sees a different significance to the events down there. Their theories are ingenious but contradictory. With the fanaticism of the scientist, the politician and the preacher, each tries to convince the others."
