= One Way Pendulum (film) =

1965 British film by Peter Yates

- Campaign book cover
- Directed by: Peter Yates
- Written by: N. F. Simpson
- Based on: One Way Pendulum by N. F. Simpson
- Produced by: Michael Deeley; Oscar Lewenstein
- Starring: Eric Sykes; George Cole
- Cinematography: Denys N. Coop
- Edited by: Peter Taylor
- Music by: Richard Rodney Bennett
- Production company: Woodfall Film Productions
- Distributed by: United Artists
- Release date: 28 January 1965
- Running time: 90 minutes
- Country: United Kingdom
- Language: English
- Budget: £40,000 or $150,000

One Way Pendulum is a 1965 British comedy film directed by Peter Yates and starring Eric Sykes and George Cole. It was adapted by N. F. Simpson from his 1959 play One Way Pendulum.

== Plot ==
Study of absurdity in a suburban family: father rebuilds the Old Bailey in the living room, and the son teaches weighing machines to sing in the attic.

== Cast ==
- Eric Sykes as Mr. Groomkirby
- George Cole as defence counsel / friend
- Julia Foster as Sylvia
- Jonathan Miller as Kirby
- Peggy Mount as Mrs. Mara Gantry
- Alison Leggatt as Mrs. Groomkirby
- Mona Washbourne as Aunt Mildred
- Douglas Wilmer as Judge / maintenance man
- Glyn Houston as Detective Inspector Barnes
- Graham Crowden as Prosecuting Counsel / caretaker
- Ken Farrington as Stan
- Walter Horsbrugh as Clerk of the Court / dry-cleaner's assistant
- Frederick Piper as Usher / office clerk
- Vincent Harding as Policeman / bus conductor
- Trevor Bannister as Groomkirby's colleague (uncredited)
- Tommy Bruce as Gormless (the voice of the "speak your weight" machine).

== Production ==
=== Development ===
Producer Michael Deeley and director Peter Yates wanted to work on a project together and saw the play at the Royal Court Theatre. Yates was excited at the prospect of the material being so different from his first feature, Summer Holiday (1963), and Deeley managed to set up the film at Woodfall Film Productions, then flush with money in the wake of the success of Tom Jones (1963). Writer John Osborne helped introduce Yates and Simpson to United Artists.

Simpson said he had received a number of offers to film the play but turned them down because he did not feel it was a movie. He changed his mind after a meeting with Yates where the director said the words were key to visual concepts. "He was the first film man I met I felt I could work with," said Simpson who wrote the script and was on set every day.

=== Filming ===
The film was the first from Woodfall to be shot in a studio and commenced filming at Twickenham Studios in March 1964.

== Critical reception ==
The film was poorly received by the public and did not recoup its money. However Woodfall Films was impressed by Michael Deeley and hired him to work for the company.

The Monthly Film Bulletin wrote: "N. F. Simpson's play has resisted translation to the screen to an extent that may surprise even those who never expect much from filmed plays. The dialogue, with its humour somehow completely self-contained, is still the only thing that matters; a few outdoor sequences do not make a film. Perhaps, too, the play worked better as a joke because its link with reality was more casual; it ran parallel to life in a suburban semi-detached rather than represented it exactly. When one is confronted with a real house in a real street, expertly shot for shabby authenticity by the Billy Liar! and A Kind Of Loving cameraman, Denys Coop, it is a very different matter. Film-wise one has been here rather often before, and the feeling of familiarity is increased by the high incidence of type-casting: notably Alison Leggatt as the matter-of-fact mother, Mona Washbourne as the invalid aunt and Peggy Mount as the daily who consumes the left-overs. All this is like a rather feeble parody of what has been described as the British New Wave. Eric Sykes and Jonathan Miller, on the other hand, veer towards caricature in their portrayals of the obsessed father and his automatous son. But at least the latter, conducting his weighing machines, provides the only memorable (if oft repeated) image in a film so visually ineffectual, particularly during the longish fantasy trial, that one might get the message just as well blindfold."

New York Times critic Howard Thompson wrote that the film was "a new serving of British-stirred froth that weighs almost as much as Big Ben. And how it got those friendly notices back in the homeland, we'll never know. The picture is excruciatingly coy and flat, coming, believe it or not, from the Woodfall production unit that gave us, among other things, Tom Jones."

The Radio Times Guide to Films gave the film 3/5 stars, writing: "The theatre production was a triumph of bizarre nonsense but the film never quite captures its spirit."

Leslie Halliwell said: "A nonsense play (which has many adherents) resists the literalness of the camera's eye."

== Release ==
The film had its world premiere on 28 January 1965 at the Rialto cinema in London.
