= N. F. Simpson =

English playwright

Norman Frederick Simpson (29 January 1919 – 27 August 2011) was an English playwright closely associated with the Theatre of the Absurd. To his friends he was known as Wally Simpson, in comic reference to the abdication crisis of 1936.

== Life ==
=== Early years ===
Born in London, Simpson studied at Emanuel School before taking a job as a bank clerk. During the Second World War he served in the Royal Artillery and Intelligence Corps, travelling to Italy, Palestine and Cyprus. Following studies at Birkbeck College for a degree in English Literature from the University of London after the war, Simpson taught English in adult education for almost 20 years.

=== Theatre ===
The turning point in Simpson’s life came in 1957 when he won third prize in The Observer newspaper’s quest for new writers, headed by theatre critic Kenneth Tynan. A Resounding Tinkle premiered at the Royal Court Theatre, London, on 1 December 1957 with Nigel Davenport as Bro Paradock and Wendy Craig as Middie Paradock. Under pressure from Tony Richardson, Simpson, to his regret, truncated the play to a 50-minute one-act piece. In 1959 the first complete production of the two-act version was performed by the Cambridge Theatre Actors, under the direction of John Bird with Peter Cook and Eleanor Bron in the leading roles. The Cambridge production toured briefly to the Royal Court, on 15 March 1959; but the theatre only belatedly staged its own production of the two-act original on 17 January 2006.

A close relationship between Simpson and the Royal Court continued after Tinkle, encompassing the plays The Hole (1958), his key work One Way Pendulum (1959) and The Cresta Run (1965). He wrote The Form (1961) for the Arts Theatre, and contributed to the West End revues One To Another (1959), One Over The Eight (1961) and On The Avenue (1961), which variously involved Peter Cook, John Mortimer, Harold Pinter, Beryl Reid and Kenneth Williams.

Following a long break from substantial theatre writing, Simpson returned to the Royal Court in 1972 with Was He Anyone?, which formed the basis of Harry Bleachbaker, a novel published in 1976.

In November 1976, Simpson was appointed Literary Manager of the English Stage Company at the Royal Court. Having supported new work by Barrie Keeffe, Sam Shepard and Snoo Wilson, he left in April 1978, returning to theatre for an Eduardo De Filippo translation, Inner Voices, at the National Theatre in 1983.

=== Radio ===
The BBC were at first resistant to the new wave of English playwrights that emerged in the late 1950s. Simpson’s A Resounding Tinkle and The Hole were both rejected by the radio network controller in November 1959. Tinkle was eventually broadcast on the BBC Third Programme in July 1960, in its one-act form with Deryck Guyler and Alison Leggatt as the Paradocks.

That year saw Simpson’s first radio commission, a sketch for the BBC Home Service's weekly revue Monday Night at Home. Cold feet amongst the production team caused it to be dropped before transmission. Subsequently, Simpson’s radio work rarely strayed from the confines of the Third Programme, most notably the 1982 monologues Snippets, read by Richard Vernon.

=== Film and television ===
The Theatre of the Absurd arrived on television in 1961, with productions of Simpson plays on both British networks. BBC TV produced a live performance of One Way Pendulum, now lost, whilst Granada mounted a shortened version of A Resounding Tinkle for ITV.

He was invited to contribute to BBC TV’s That Was The Week That Was, although his sketch, 'Televising Parliament', was dropped due to overruns in the live transmission on 16 November 1963, and has never surfaced.

Hot on the heels of his Summer Holiday success, director Peter Yates agreed to shoot Simpson’s best known stage play, One Way Pendulum (1964). Starring Eric Sykes, George Cole and a mute Jonathan Miller, Yates' rendition of the play captured Simpson’s matter-of-fact approach to nonsense but failed at the box office.

As the BBC’s Acting Assistant Head of Light Entertainment, Frank Muir invited Simpson to write for BBC2 in 1965. The central characters of Tinkle were expanded into seven half-hours of Three Rousing Tinkles (1966) and Four Tall Tinkles (1967), featuring Edwin Apps and Pauline Devaney as Bro and Middie. He followed this with World in Ferment (1969), a six-part parody of current affairs programming with John Bird, Eleanor Bron, Jack Shepherd and Angela Thorne, of which no episodes survive. His final series for television was the unsuccessful Charley’s Grants (1970), co-written with John Fortune and John Wells, starring Hattie Jacques, and produced by Ian MacNaughton (who produced Monty Python’s Flying Circus), which is also entirely lost.

Plays followed, including a satire on advertising, Thank You Very Much (1971), and an effective three-hander for ITV, Silver Wedding (1974), directed by Mike Newell. Simpson’s highest-profile production for television was Elementary, My Dear Watson (1973), a Sherlock Holmes parody for BBC One's Comedy Playhouse starring John Cleese and Willie Rushton. It has been screened several times at the National Film Theatre in London.

It is frequently argued that Simpson’s work operates better in small doses (Simpson himself described his only novel Harry Bleachbaker (sometimes aka Man Overboard) as one which he expected no-one to be able to read to the end), so it is natural that he should have produced so much sketch material for television. World in Ferment lent towards this strength, and his skilful monologues for women were seen again in But Seriously – It’s Sheila Hancock (1972). Other vehicles included Ned Sherrin's The Rather Reassuring Programme (1977), Beryl Reid Says… Good Evening (1968) and The Dick Emery Show (1977–1980).

=== Later activities ===
Simpson lived in Cornwall in later life and travelled around England's canals on a narrowboat.

A radio documentary written and presented by David Quantick about his life and work, Reality is an Illusion Caused by Lack of N. F. Simpson, produced by Curtains For Radio on BBC Radio 4 on 5 April 2007, featured contributions from Eleanor Bron, Jonathan Coe, John Fortune, Sir Jonathan Miller, Sir John Mortimer, David Nobbs, Ned Sherrin, Eric Sykes and Simpson himself.

It featured material recorded at a workshop for a new play, If So, Then Yes, his first full-length piece in 30 years. The Royal Court presented a rehearsed reading on 11 July 2007. The script was published in February 2009. The production made its world premiere at the Jermyn Street Theatre in September, 2010, featuring actor Roddy Maude-Roxby, who appeared in the 1959 production of Simpson's play, One Way Pendulum, at the Royal Court Theatre.

Absurdia, a grouping of short plays by Simpson and Michael Frayn ran at the Donmar Warehouse from July to September 2007. The short version of A Resounding Tinkle and the sketch Gladly Otherwise were directed by Douglas Hodge and starred Peter Capaldi. Both scripts were republished by Faber to mark this revival.

A London revival of Was He Anyone? was staged at the Union Theatre during November 2007 by Oblique House.

A comprehensive season of Simpson's work for the screen – both silver and small – took place at BFI Southbank during May 2008.

If So, Then Yes premiered at the Jermyn Street Theatre, London, running from 7 September to 2 October 2010. Simpson died at the Royal Cornwall Hospital in Truro on 27 August 2011, having lived in Townsend, Polruan since 2005.

== Style ==
A Resounding Tinkle typifies Simpson’s aversion to plot and establishes his talent for memorable one-liners and non-sequiturs. As with all of his subsequent work, the play demands absolutely straight delivery from actors. Such an approach fosters a conviction within the audience that the characters are living in a form of reality, where the formation of a government can be arranged via door-to-door enquiries. The extraordinary and impossible are treated as perfectly rational everyday events. This comic balance is recognised as a major influence on the early work of Peter Cook, particularly the E. L. Wisty monologues.

Many comparisons have been drawn to the work of key absurdist playwright Eugène Ionesco. However, Simpson denied any link, adding that he had never even heard of the writer when he commenced a career in nonsense. In his own view, the valid literary parallels are with Lewis Carroll, James Thurber and P. G. Wodehouse.

Simpson’s early work must also be viewed in its cultural context. BBC Radio's The Goon Show was widely admired, bringing surrealism to the masses for the first time. Plays such as A Resounding Tinkle arguably gentrified the idiom for London’s theatregoers, and with them the highbrow elite.

== Works ==
=== Theatre ===
- A Resounding Tinkle (1957)
- The Hole (1958)
- One To Another [sketch writer] (1959)
- One Way Pendulum – A Farce in a New Dimension (1959)
- The Form (1961)
- On The Avenue [sketch writer] (1961)
- One Over The Eight [sketch writer] (1961)
- The Cresta Run (1965)
- How Are Your Handles? [sketches old and new] (1970)
- Playback 625 [with Leopoldo Maler] (1970)
- The Bear by Anton Chekhov [adaptation] (1972)
- Was He Anyone? (1972)
- Whither the Ancient Burial Mounds of Old New Brunswick (1978)
- Inner Voices by Eduardo De Filippo [adaptation] (1983)
- One Way Pendulum [revival by Jonathan Miller] (1988)
- Royal Court 50: A Resounding Tinkle (2006)
- If So, Then Yes [reading at Royal Court Theatre] (2007)
- Absurdia: A Resounding Tinkle [revival by Douglas Hodge] (2007)
- Was He Anyone? [revival at Union Theatre] (2007)
- If So, Then Yes [premiere at Jermyn Street Theatre] (2010)

=== Radio ===
- A Resounding Tinkle [one-act play] (1960)
- Something Rather Effective [play] (1972)
- Sketches for Radio [sketches] (1974)
- Whither the Ancient Burial Mounds of Old New Brunswick (1979)
- The Parrot Cage Inspector [monologue] (1982)
- Snippets [monologue] (1982)
- Snippets Two [series] (1982)

=== Television ===
- One Way Pendulum (1961)
- A Resounding Tinkle [for Television Playhouse] (1961)
- Uhu… Huh? [sketches for Canadian television] (1965)
- 'Make-A-Man, or The Human Being: Is It Obsolete?' [for New Release] (1966)
- Three Rousing Tinkles [series] (1966)
- Four Tall Tinkles [series] (1967)
- Beryl Reid Says… Good Evening [sketches] (1968)
- World in Ferment [series] (1969)
- Charley’s Grants [co-writer, with John Wells and John Fortune] (1970)
- Thank You Very Much [for Play For Today] (1971)
- But Seriously – It’s Sheila Hancock [sketch writer] (1972)
- 'People Ltd.' [for Full House] (1972)
- Elementary, My Dear Watson [for Comedy Playhouse] (1973)
- Silver Wedding [for Late Night Theatre] (1974)
- An Upward Fall [for Crown Court] (1977)
- The Dick Emery Show [sketch writer] (1977–1980)
- 'One of Our St Bernard Dogs Is Missing' [poem, for Closedown] (1977)
- A Rather Reassuring Programme [sketch writer] (1977)
- Wainwright’s Law [scene writer for educational series] (1980)

=== Films ===
- One Way Pendulum (film) [screenplay] (1964)
- Diamonds for Breakfast [contributing writer] (1968)

=== Recordings ===
- He’s Innocent of Watergate [sketch writer] (1974)

=== Publications ===
- A Resounding Tinkle [one-act] (1958)
- The Hole (1958)
- The Observer Plays [featuring two-act Tinkle] (1958)
- New English Dramatists [featuring two-act Tinkle] (1960)
- One Way Pendulum: A Farce in a New Dimension (1960)
- 'The Overcoat' [short story for Man About Town magazine, illustrated by Peter Blake] (1960)
- Sketches from One To Another (1960)
- 'The Strawlined Hydrant' [short story for Vogue magazine] (1960)
- The Form (1961)
- New Directions: Five One-Act Plays in the Modern Idiom [featuring one-act Tinkle] (1961)
- The Hole, and Other Plays & Sketches (1964)
- The Long and the Short and the Tall [featuring one-act Tinkle] (1964)
- The New British Drama [featuring One Way Pendulum] (1964)
- The Cresta Run (1966)
- A Resounding Tinkle [two-act] (1968)
- Some Tall Tinkles [selected television scripts] (1968)
- Was He Anyone? (1973)
- Harry Bleachbaker: A Novel (1976)
- Play Ten [featuring two short plays] (1977)
- Inner Voices by Eduardo De Filippo [translation] (1983)
- Snippets (2006)
- A Resounding Tinkle [two-act, also featuring 'Gladly Otherwise'] (2007)
- If So, Then Yes (2009)
- "Most of What Follows is a Complete Waste of Time" - Monologues, Dialogues, Sketches and Other Writings (2013)
- Collected Plays (2013)

=== Unproduced or unfinished works ===
- Crates [stage play] (1957)
- 'Out There By All Means But Not in Here If You Don't Mind' [sketch] (1960)
- 'Televising Parliament' [sketch] (1963)
- A Seasonal Swing [television play] (pre-1965)
- The Consultant [television play] (1965)
- The Row [television play] (1965)
- Afternoon Tea (In A High-Ceilinged Room) [television play] (1975), [radio play] (1978)
- Napoli Milionaria by Eduardo De Filippo [translation, used as basis for Peter Tinniswood's 1991 script produced at the National Theatre]
