= Journey Through the Night =

Novel by Anne de Vries

Reis door de nacht
- Author: Anne de Vries
- Language: Dutch
- Genre: Christian literature, children's literature, historical literature, war novel
- Publisher: Callenbach
- Publication date: 1951–1958
- Publication place: The Netherlands
- Media type: Print (hardcover)
- Pages: 474 (2012 edition)
- ISBN: 9780921100256

Journey Through the Night (Dutch: Reis door de nacht) is a novel, originally in four volumes published from 1951 to 1958, by Dutch author Anne de Vries. The novel centers around the representation of the Second World War in the Netherlands and the impact it had on a reformed family. Since its publication, it has been translated in English several times, most recently in 2001 by Inheritance Publications. .

== Background ==
Anne de Vries was born in Kloosterveen, on the countryside of Drenthe and lived on a "lonely farm". He however moved to Zeist, a wealthy town between Utrecht and Amsterdam, to become a teacher at a local school. As he longed back to his childhood on the countryside, De Vries wrote the novel Bartje in the 1930s, which quickly became a popular work of fiction and resulted in De Vries' breakthrough as a writer.

In 1940, De Vries moved back to Drenthe. During the Second World War, De Vries was involved in the Dutch Resistance. De Vries also held contacts with Johannes Post, of whom he later also wrote a biography. In 1945, De Vries was arrested by the Sicherheitsdienst, but was released because one of the Nazi officers loved his novel Hilde.

Stichting 1940-1945, which takes care of the commemorations of the war in the Netherlands, plead Anne de Vries to write an educational children's novel on the war. In Reis door de nacht, De Vries decided to combine both actual events in his life in the 1940s and fiction.

== Plot ==
The book is divided into 4 parts:

- Part one : Into the Darkness
- Part two : The Storm Rises (published in English under the title The Darkness Deepens)
- Part three : Morning Glory (published in English under the title Dawn's Early Light)
- Part four : The New Day (published in English under the title A New Day)

The main character is Jan (in the translation John) de Boer. He is the eldest son of the family. During World War 2, the 5 year German occupation, he gets involved in the Resistance.

=== The Storm Rises ===
Two years have passed. The family is getting used to the war. But father De Boer joins the Underground Resistance. Jan and his sister Guusje (in the translation Tricia) also get involved. At the end of the chapter a meeting of the Underground Resistance is thwarted by the Germans and the family must go underground. During the last chapter, Uncle Gerrit hides in the house from Germans while the rest of the family escape. He is forced to use the house's secret tunnel to escape from the Germans and he flees into the forest. The de Boer family house in destroyed by a German grenade and burns to the ground. The book finishes with the de Boer family hiding in a forest as the Germans destroy their house.

=== Morning Glory ===
After the Germans have destroyed the house of De Boer, Jan is in hiding. An old friend joins the Fight Force (Knok Ploeg (KP)). After his adventures in the FF the force is betrayed and Jan must go into hiding again.

== Reception ==
=== Reception upon release ===
A Gereformeerd gezinsblad journalist praised the book for its story-telling and said that the book teaches the younger generation about the war. A journalist of the De Heerenveensche koerier critiqued the second part of the novel for being slightly idealistic.

=== Modern reception ===
Although the novel is generally seen as a classic, there has also been criticism that the novel represents a 1950s view of the Second World War that is not dominant anymore. While in Reis door de nacht, taking the right moral choices is seen as one of the main features of being a good person, 21st century historians argue that most Dutch people ended up in certain situations by mere accident.

In 2018, Reis door nacht was part of an exposition of children's literature in the Second World War, alongside Oorlogswinter.

== Influences on other work ==
Dutch author Maarten 't Hart, who grew up in a reformed environment, stated that De Vries' depiction of the character Wiesje Langemaat in the novel awakened his interest in travesty. Wiesje Langemaat is a side character and knokploeg member who was born as Koos, but decided on wearing woman's clothes and behaving as a woman after having had to be dressed up as a woman to escape an arrest. However, no reference is made in the novel to the character's sexual orientation. His dressing up as a woman is clearly presented as a way to escape and his disguise proves useful for the strike team he is a part of.
