= Layla Baalbaki =

Lebanese novelist, journalist, activist and feminist (1936–2023)

Layla Baalbakki
- Born: 1936; Beirut, Lebanon
- Died: 17 October 2023 (aged 87); London, England
- Education: Beirut Jesuit University
- Occupations: Novelist, journalist
- Writing career
- Pen name: Laila/Leila Balabaki, Baalbaki, Baalbakki

Layla Baalbaki (Arabic: ليلى بعلبكي; 1936 – 21 October 2023) was a Lebanese novelist, journalist, activist and feminist. Among her most notable works is Ana Ahya (I Live) (1958) which tells the story of a woman's protest against parental authority and community leaders. Balabakki's literary work also inspired political uproar because of her public criticisms of Islam and sexually explicit stories. Balabakki was brought to trial, while her work was censored. Her desire to push back against societal values and explore alternative female identities made Balabakki a large influence on contemporary Arab feminism.

== Early life and education ==
Born to a traditional Shiite Muslim family in 1936, Balabakki grew up in Beirut. Throughout her adolescence, Balabakki quickly understood that female education was not valued. Despite this obstacle, she pursued higher education at the Beirut Jesuit University where she studied literature. On the side, Balabakki worked as a secretary in Lebanese Parliament. Even though Balabakki eventually left university for this job, the experience enabled her to awaken a political perspective and form her own ideas about the government's role in shaping a social culture that subjugated Arab women. Balabakki left Parliament to pursue a one-year scholarship in Europe, an experience which would later inform her ideas about freedom and expression.

== Notable works ==
In 1958, Balabakki published her first book, I Live when she was 22 years old. The protagonist, Lina Fayyad, presents a powerful first-person narrative that exhibits an acute awareness of the self and realism. In the wake of World War II, Lina is a bold Lebanese woman who rejects societal influences. Openly rebelling against her father and the bourgeois class, Lina aggressively seeks liberation from her feminine identity. She finds refuge in the writings of Sartre, exposing herself to Western literature and existentialist thought. Despite her family's objections, Lina goes to work and to university, where she meets and falls in love with Baha, a communist. However, Lina's intellectual ideals do not translate into her reality. In spite of her protests, Lina continues to be subject to societal expectations and eventually returns home, dejected. Through Lina's experiences, Balabakki illustrates an internal feminist experience that conflicts with external social culture. This theme continues through Balabakki's second novel, al-Aliha al-mamsukha (The Gods Deformed) (1960). Its heroine, Mira, at one point exclaims, "I've had it up to here with fathers, if he weren't dead, I'd wish he were." Quotes like these suggest that the oppressive nature of the father figure and patriarchal society function to inhibit and inspire feminist rebellion.

In 1963, Balabakki published her first collection of short stories, Safinat hanan ila al-qamar (The Spaceship of Tenderness to the Moon). A few months later, Balabakki was charged with obscenity and "endangering public morality". The Lebanese vice squad actually traveled to every bookstore where the book was sold to confiscate all remaining copies because of its erotic content. Though eventually acquitted, this controversy marked the end of Balabakki's fictional work, as she spent the remainder of literary career as a journalist in Beirut.

== Activism ==
Balabakki was an advocate for gender equality, freedom of expression, and social reform. In May 1959, Balabakki delivered her "We Without Masks" address, a speech about the socialization of Lebanese youth. She pointed how Lebanese youth grow up to "be ashamed of their bodies and to fight every sensation" that erupts from sexual curiosity. In contrast, American and European youth experience more freedom, growing up with exposure to Elvis Presley and Seven-Up. Balabakki gave these examples hoping to inspire a social rebellion that would modernize the state.

== Death ==
Layla Balabakki died on 17 October 2023, at the age of 87.

== Bibliography ==
Novels
1958 – Ana Ahya (I Live)
1960 – Al-Aliha al-mamsukha (The Gods Deformed)

Short Stories
1963 – Safinat hanan ila al-quamar (The Spaceship of Tenderness to the Moon)

== See also ==
- Muna Jabbur
