= Bartje =

Dutch fictional character

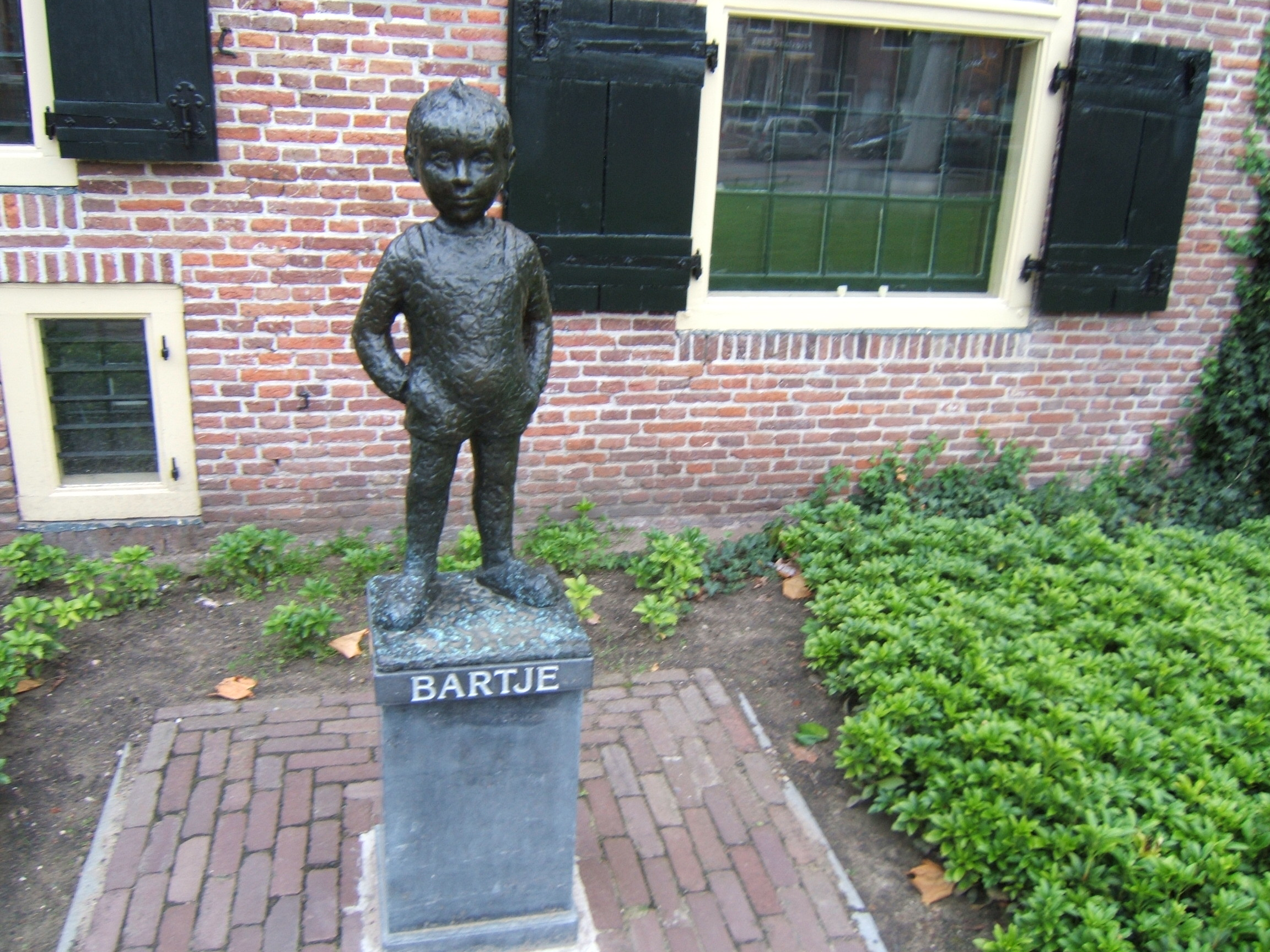
Bronze statue of Bartje

Bartje Bartels is the main character in a series of Dutch books written by Anne de Vries from 1935 on. Bartje is a boy who lives with his poor family in the countryside of Drenthe. His parents want him to become a farmer like his father, but Bartje has other ideas. He initially works as an apprentice, but when his mother dies, he has to look after his younger brothers and sisters.

There is a statue of Bartje in the city of Assen which has been vandalized several times.

== Famous quotation ==
The most famous quotation from Bartje's books appears in a story in which the family is sitting at the table to eat brown beans. Bartje, who hates brown beans, pushes his plate away when his mother is about to give him some. He refuses to say grace (a prayer to thank God for the food they are about to eat) and says: Ik bid nie veur bruune boon'n (in modern Dutch: Ik bid niet voor bruine bonen, meaning: I won’t thank God for brown beans). His parents react with shock and he gets into big trouble.

== Television series ==
Bartje's stories were adapted into a television series by Willy van Hemert. It aired in 1972 and again in 2004 and used Standard Dutch subtitles because the actors speak in a Drèents dialect.
