= Jim Starling =

Fictional character

Jim Starling is the central character of a series of seven books for young people written by E. W. Hildick. Each book in the series details an episode in the lives of four close friends, Jim, Terry, Nip and Goggles, who call themselves the Last Apple Gang. They are all pupils at a boy's secondary modern school in the town of "Smogbury" in the north of England. Each book contains a central theme — for example, in Jim Starling Goes To Town (1963) the boys go down to London to watch Burnley FC in the 1962 FA Cup Final — and one or more related subplots, a common one being a feud with a teacher or rival peer group.

In order of publication, the books are

- Jim Starling (1958)
- Jim Starling and the Agency (1958)
- Jim Starling and the Colonel (1960)
- Jim Starling's Holiday (1960)
- Jim Starling Takes Over (1963)
- Jim Starling and the Spotted Dog (1963)
- Jim Starling Goes To Town (1963)

None of the books have been published since 1971.

== Assessment ==
During the time that they were readily available to young readers (in the children's section of the nation's public libraries) opinion was sharply divided on the series' merit: some praised them for their social realism, but others believed they stereotyped working-class childhood.
