= The Dud Avocado =

Debut novel by Elaine Dundy

- Author: Elaine Dundy
- Language: English
- Publication date: 1958

The Dud Avocado is the debut novel of writer Elaine Dundy, first published in 1958. The novel was a bestseller upon its release and earned acclaim from Groucho Marx, Gore Vidal and Ernest Hemingway. After falling out of print it was re-issued by NYRB Classics and Virago Modern Classics in 2007 and 2018 respectively.

The novel was based on Dundy's own experiences living in Paris and follows the misadventures of Sally Jay Gorce, a 21-year-old American graduate having love affairs and trying to break into the film industry in France.

In October 1993, seven years after Private Eye had pointed out the similarities, Jilly Cooper admitted that sections of her first two novels, Emily and Bella, were plagiarised from The Dud Avocado, but said that it was not deliberate.

== Summary ==
After three months in Paris, Sally Jay Gorce, a 21-year-old college graduate, runs into Larry Keevil, an actor she performed Summer Stock with in America. Over the course of their conversation Sally Jay decides she is in love with him and makes up her mind to seduce him. To stay in contact Sally Jay auditions for several plays he is casting and lands a role. Sally Jay then breaks up with Teddy Visconti, the charming middle-aged Italian married man with a mistress she has been having an affair with since her arrival in Paris. To her surprise Teddy takes the news badly as his wife has recently left him and he hoped to marry Sally Jay.

As a gesture of good will Teddy invites both Sally and Larry to a dinner party where he introduces Larry to the Contessa, his mistress. To Sally Jay's horror this thwarts her attempts to seduce Larry for herself. Eventually Larry and Sally Jay make plans to connect on opening night, but after a wild night they are too drunk to consummate their relationship. Larry briefly disappears from Sally Jay's life and she does some minor modelling work for Jim Breit, an American artist nearer her own age with whom she eventually has a relationship. As things with Jim start to become more serious, Larry reappears in her life, urging her to join him on the Côte d'Argent where Baxter, a Canadian fan of Sally Jay's, and Missy, Baxter's friend and Larry's latest girlfriend, are going for a trip.

The trip is a huge failure until the group meets some filmmakers. Larry initially believes the scouts are interested in casting Sally Jay, but quickly learns that they are more interested in Baxter. To Larry's surprise Baxter has been scouted throughout his life and is completely uninterested in filmmaking, but the more ambitious Sally Jay and Larry convince him to play along with the filmmakers in order to bolster their chances of making it into the movie. Baxter lands a prominent role in the film while Sally Jay and Larry spend a miserable time as extras. After shooting wraps the friends spend a final night out on the town where they run into Teddy, the Contessa, and Larry's ex-girlfriend Lila. Teddy tells Sally Jay that Larry is actually a pimp and Lila has been working for him. Initially doubtful, Sally Jay comes to realize that Larry intended to pimp her out to Baxter and stole her passport. After witnessing Larry assault Lila, Sally Jay escapes back to Paris.

In Paris, Sally Jay meets Jim, now married to her ill friend Judy. To soothe Judy, Sally Jay tells her she is going to Hollywood to act. After receiving a letter from her wealthy uncle Roger, informing her that Sally Jay's passport was used illegally and that Larry eventually confessed to having stolen it, Sally Jay decides she is sick of Paris and heads to Hollywood after all.

Once in America Sally Jay once again changes her mind and decides to become a librarian. Working in New York City she is surprised when Maximilian Ramage, a British photographer she met in Paris, wanders into her library. Max confesses he has been looking for Sally Jay everywhere and that he is in love with her. After a whirlwind night together they decide to get married and head to Japan.

== Reception and legacy ==
The novel is noted for its humor. In a letter to Cooper, Groucho Marx wrote "The Dud Avocado made me laugh, scream and guffaw (which, incidentally, is a great name for a law firm)". The book has maintained a positive reputation without becoming particularly well-known. The Guardian approvingly re-reviewed the novel in 2011, comparing Sally Jay to the Truman Capote character Holly Golightly and J. D. Salinger's Holden Caulfield.
