= Lump of Sun =

1958 novel by Zaim Topčić

- First edition cover
- Author: Zaim Topčić
- Original title: Grumen sunca
- Language: Bosnian
- Genre: Historical fiction
- Publisher: Rad
- Publication date: 24 November 1958
- Publication place: SFR Yugoslavia
- Pages: 465

Lump of Sun (Bosnian: Grumen sunca) is the debut novel of Bosnian writer Zaim Topčić. It was published by the Belgrade-based publishing house Rad on 24 November 1958. The story revolves around Ustasha concentration camps of World War II.

The novel received the Annual Award of the Association of Writers of Bosnia and Herzegovina for best book published in 1958.

It was preceded by the collections of short stories released in 1952 and 1955, respectively.
