= Herbert Adams (novelist) =

English mystery writer (1874–1958)

Herbert Adams (1874–1958) was an English writer of fifty 'cosy' mystery novels, 28 featuring the detective Roger Bennion, a golfer and amateur sleuth whose cases are often set in or around golfing competitions; and 9 feature Jimmie Haswell, a London lawyer. He also wrote short stories, humorous verse and two other mystery novels under the pseudonym Jonathan Gray.

== As 'Jonathan Gray' ==
- 'Safety Last' (1934)
- 'The Owl' (1937)

== As Herbert Adams ==
=== Jimmie Haswell Novels ===
- 'The Secret of Bogey House' (1924)
- 'The Crooked Lip' (1926)
- 'The Queen's Gate Mystery' (1927)
- 'The Empty Bed'(1928)
- 'Rogues Fall Out'(1928)
- 'The Golden Ape' (1930)
- 'The Crime in the Dutch Garden' (1931)
- 'The Paulton Plot' (1932)
- 'The Woman in Black' (1933)

=== Roger Bennion Novels ===
- 'Death Off the Fairway' (1936)
- 'The Old Jew Mystery' (1936)
- 'A Single Hair' (1937)
- 'The Bluff' (1938)
- 'The Damned Spot' (1938)
- 'Black Death' (1939)
- 'The Nineteenth Hole Mystery' (1939)
- 'The Case of the Stolen Bridegroom' (1940)
- 'The Chief Witness' (1940)
- 'Stab in the Back' (1941)
- 'Roger Bennion's Double' (1941)
- 'The Araway Oath' (1942)
- 'Signal for Invasion' (1942)
- 'Victory Song' (1943)
- 'Four Winds' (1944)
- 'The Writing on the Wall' (1945)
- 'Welcome Home!' (1946)
- 'Diamonds Are Trumps' (1947)
- 'Crime Wave at Little Cornford' (1948)
- 'One to Play' (1949)
- 'The Dean's Daughters' (1950)
- 'The Sleeping Draught' (1951)
- 'Exit the Skeleton' (1952)
- 'The Spectre in Brown' (1953)
- 'Slippery Dick' (1954)
- 'The Judas Kiss' (1955)
- 'Death on the First Tee' (1957)
- 'Death of a Viewer' (1958)

=== Non-Series Novels ===
- 'A Virtue of Necessity' (1900)
- 'By Order of the Five' (1925)
- 'The Sloane Square Mystery' (1925)
- 'Comrade Jill' (1926)
- 'The Perfect Round' (1927). Short stories
- 'Caroline Ormesby's Crime' (1930). Serialised: Birmingham Daily Gazette, 'Caroline Hits Back' (1930)
- 'Oddways' (1930)
- 'A Lady So Innocent' (1932)
- 'John Brand's Will' (1933). US Title: The Golf House Murder
- 'The Knife' (1934). US Title: The Strange Murder of Hatton, K.C.
- 'Mystery and Minette' (1934)
- 'The Body in the Bunker' (1935)
- 'Fate Laughs' (1935)
- 'A Word of Six Letters' (1936). US Title: Murder Without Risk
- 'The Lovely Lucinda'. Serialised: Weekly Telegraph (1937)
- 'The Scarlet Feather' (1943)
- 'Murder Most Just' (1956)

=== Short stories ===
- 'A Lady-Killer'. Young Man, 21 July 1900
- 'A Child of Cheshire'. Young Woman, 5 October 1900
- 'A Consignment from Yarmouth'. Beverley & East Riding Recorder, 3 August 1907
- 'TITLE UNKNOWN'. Weekly Telegraph Christmas Annual (1931)
