= E. W. Hildick =

British writer (1925–2001)

Edmund Wallace Hildick (1925–2001) was a prolific children's book author, who wrote under the name E. W. Hildick. He wrote, amongst others, the Ghost Squad, Jim Starling, Birdy Jones, Jack McGurk, and Lemon Kelly series.

== Background ==
He was born in Bradford, England, in 1925. After two years of service in the RAF, he became a secondary school teacher, then a writer, before moving to the United States to become editor of a literary magazine. He was one of the very few British juvenile authors of his generation to achieve success in America.

He started writing while he was a teacher in a secondary modern school at Dewsbury, in the West Riding of Yorkshire in England, his intended audience being "tough, modern kids similar to the ones I teach". He died in 2001.

== Series ==
=== Jim Starling ===
- Jim Starling (1958)
- Jim Starling and the Agency (1958)
- Jim Starling and the Colonel (1958)
- Jim Starling's Holiday (1960)
- Jim Starling and the Spotted Dog (1963)
- Jim Starling Goes to Town (1963)
- Jim Starling Takes Over (1963)

=== McGurk Mystery ===
- The Nose Knows (1963)
- Dolls in Danger (1974; a.k.a. Deadline for McGurk)
- The Case of the Condemned Cat (1975)
- The Case of the Nervous Newsboy (1976)
- The Great Rabbit Robbery (1976; a.k.a. "The Great Rabbit Rip-Off")
- The Case of the Invisible Dog (1977)
- The Case of the Secret Scribbler (1978)
- The Case of the Phantom Frog (1979)
- The Case of the Treetop Treasure (1980)
- The Case of the Snowbound Spy (1980)
- The Case of the Bashful Bank Robber (1981)
- The Case of the Four Flying Fingers (1981)
- McGurk Gets Good and Mad (1982)
- The Case of the Felon's Fiddle (1982)
- The Case of the Slingshot Sniper (1983)
- The Case of the Muttering Mummy (1986)
- The Case of the Wandering Weathervanes (1988)
- The Case of the Vanishing Ventriloquist (1989)
- The Case Of The Purloined Parrot (1990)
- The Case of the Desperate Drummer (1993)
- The Case of the Fantastic Footprints (1994)
- The Case of the Absent Author (1995)
- The Case of the Wiggling Wig (1996)

=== McGurk Fantasy ===
- The Case of the Dragon in Distress (1991)
- The Case of the Weeping Witch (1992)

=== Birdy Jones ===
- Birdy Jones (1963)
- Birdy and the Group (1968)
- Birdy Swings North (1969)
- Birdy in Amsterdam (1970)
- Birdy Jones and the New York Heads (1974)

=== Lemon Kelly ===
- Meet Lemon Kelly (1963)
- Lemon Kelly Digs Deep (1964)
- Lemon Kelly and the Home Made Boy (1968)

=== Louie ===
- Louie's Lot (1965)
- Louie's S.O.S (1968)
- Louie's Snowstorm (1974)
- Louie's Ransom (1978)

=== Questers ===
- The Questers (1966)
- Calling Questers Four (1967)
- The Questers and the Whispering Spy (1967)

=== Crown books, one crown ===
- Back with Parren (1968)
- Here Comes Parren (1968)

=== Ghost Squad ===
- 1. Ghost Squad Breaks Through (1984)
- 2. Ghost Squad and Halloween Conspiracy (1985)
- 2. Ghost Squad and the Prowling Hermits (1987)
- 3. The Ghost Squad Flies Concorde (1985)
- 6. The Ghost Squad and the Menace of the Malevs (1988)
- Ghost Squad and the Ghoul of Grunberg (1986)

=== Felicity Snell Mystery ===
- The Purloined Corn Popper (1997)
- The Serial Sneak Thief (1997)

=== Alison McNair ===
- The Active-Enzyme Lemon-Freshened Junior High School Witch (1973)
- The Top-Flight Fully-Automated Junior High School Girl Detective (1978)

== Novels ==
- The Boy at the Window (1960)
- Bed and Work (1962)
- Mapper Mundy's Treasure Hunt (1963)
- A Town on the Never (1963)
- Lunch with Ashurbanipal (1965)
- Lucky Les (1967)
- Time Explorers, Inc (1967)
- Manhattan is Missing (1969)
- Monte Carlo or Bust! (1969; a.k.a. Those Daring Young Men in Their Jaunty Jalopies)
- Top Boy at Twisters Creek (1969)
- The Prisoners of Gridling Gap (1971)
- The Doughnut Dropout (1972)
- Kids Commune (1972)
- Bracknell's Law (1975)
- The Weirdown Experiment (1976)
- A Cat Called Amnesia (1976)
- Vandals (1977)
- The Loop (1977)
- The Memory Tap (1989)
- My Famous Father (1990)
- Hester Bidgood (1994)

== Non-fiction ==
- Word for Word: The Rewriting of Fiction (1965)
- Writing With Care (1967)
- A Close Look at Television and Sound Broadcasting (1967)
- Thirteen Types of Narrative (1968)
- Children and Fiction (1970)
