= Angus Wilson =

British author (1913–1991)

Sir Angus Wilson CBE
- Born: Angus Frank Johnstone-Wilson; 11 August 1913; Bexhill-on-Sea, Sussex, England
- Died: 31 May 1991 (aged 77); Bury St Edmunds, Suffolk, England
- Resting place: West Suffolk Crematorium, Risby, St Edmundsbury Borough, Suffolk, United Kingdom
- Education: Westminster School; Merton College, Oxford
- Partner: Tony Garrett
- Writing career
- Period: 1949–1986
- Notable works: Anglo-Saxon Attitudes (1956); The Middle Age of Mrs Eliot (1958)
- Notable awards: James Tait Black Memorial Prize (1958); CBE (1968); Knight Bachelor (1980)

Sir Angus Frank Johnstone-Wilson (11 August 1913 – 31 May 1991) was an English novelist and short story writer. He was one of England's first openly gay authors. He was awarded the 1958 James Tait Black Memorial Prize for The Middle Age of Mrs Eliot and later received a knighthood for his services to literature.

== Biography ==
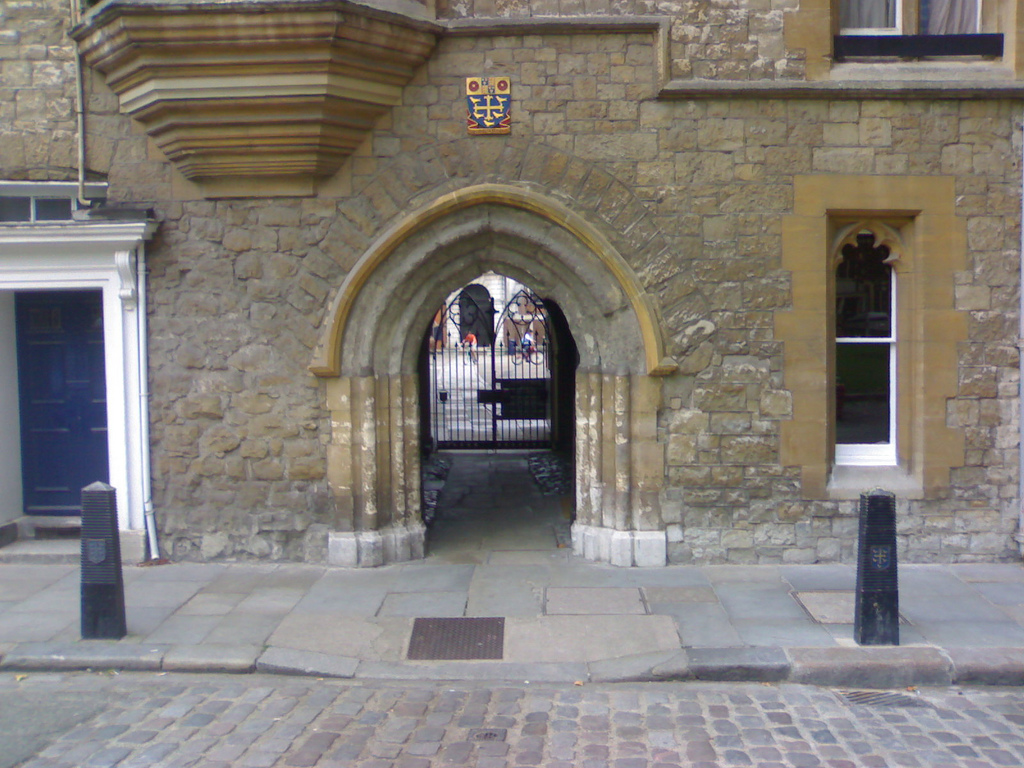
Westminster School

Wilson was born in Bexhill, Sussex, England, "much the youngest" sixth son of English father, William Thomas Frank Johnstone-Wilson (1865-1938), and South African mother, Maude (née Caney; 1867-1929), daughter of a wealthy jeweller of Durban. Wilson's grandfather had served in a prestigious Scottish army regiment, and owned an estate in Dumfriesshire, where William- or "Willie"- Johnstone-Wilson (despite being born at Haymarket) was raised, and where he subsequently lived. Willie Johnstone-Wilson was "a feckless father of Dickensian or Joycean dimensions", represented in his son's writings among "the shabby-genteel improvisers that populate the Wilsonian floating world". He had been a "stage door johnnie" who provided his family with "a curious hybrid of need and privilege" and "pecuniary embarrassments", the family being "downwardly mobile", Willie "piloting them unsteadily in that direction".

Wilson was educated at Westminster School and Merton College, Oxford, and in 1937 became a librarian in the British Museum's Department of Printed Books, working on the new General Catalogue. Previous employment included tutoring, catering, and co-managing a restaurant with his brother.

During World War II, he worked in the Naval section at the code-breaking establishment, Bletchley Park, translating Italian Naval codes. A wearer of large, brightly coloured bow-ties and shirts, Sinclair McKay described him as one of the "famous homosexuals" at Bletchley. He was billeted with a "kind family" in the village of Simpson, who worried about his "prodigious consumption" of cigarettes by coughing theatrically. They only read (and re-read) John Bunyan's The Holy War. The "claustrophobia" of the billet may have contributed to his increasing depression and his "Pompeiian mood swings". The work situation was stressful and led to a nervous breakdown, for which he was treated by Rolf-Werner Kosterlitz. A colleague said when he threw an inkpot at a Wren (a member of the British Women's Royal Naval Service--WRNS) that "Angus isn't really mad. He threw inkpots at all the right people!"

A Wren, Dorothy Robertson, was taught traffic analysis by Wilson and another instructor. She recalled him as:

a brilliant young homosexual .... He used to mince into the room wearing, in those days, outrageous clothes in all colours; he chain-smoked; his nails were bitten down to the quick and he had a rather hysterical laugh.

Wilson returned to the Museum after the end of the war, and it was there that he met Tony Garrett (born 1929), who was to be his companion for the rest of his life. Years later their life together was sympathetically portrayed in the BBC2 film "Angus and Tony" (1984), directed by Jonathan Gili. It was one of the first depictions of the life of a gay couple on British television.

Wilson's first publication was a collection of short stories, The Wrong Set (1949), followed quickly by the daring novel Hemlock and After, which was a great success, prompting invitations to lecture in Europe.

Wilson worked as a reviewer, and in 1955 he resigned from the British Museum to write full-time (although his financial situation did not justify doing so) and moved to Suffolk.

He was instrumental in getting Colin Wilson's first novel published in 1956 and from 1957 he gave lectures further afield, in Japan, Switzerland, Australia, and the USA. He was appointed a Commander of the Order of the British Empire (CBE) in the 1968 New Year Honours, and received many literary honours in succeeding years. He was made a Knight Bachelor in the 1980 Birthday Honours, and was President of the Royal Society of Literature from 1982 to 1988. His remaining years were affected by ill health, and he died of a stroke at a nursing home in Bury St Edmunds, Suffolk, on 31 May 1991, aged 77.

Wilson's writing, which has a strongly satirical vein, expresses his concern with preserving a liberal humanistic outlook in the face of fashionable doctrinaire temptations. Several of his works were adapted for television. He was Professor of English Literature at the University of East Anglia from 1966 to 1978, and jointly helped to establish their creative writing course at master's level in 1970, which was then a groundbreaking initiative in the United Kingdom.

Wilson's medals, then in private ownership, were shown on the BBC Television programme Antiques Roadshow in August 2018.

== Bibliography ==
=== Novels ===
- Hemlock and After (1952)
- Anglo-Saxon Attitudes (1956)
- The Middle Age of Mrs Eliot (1958)
- The Old Men at the Zoo (1961)
- Late Call (1964)
- No Laughing Matter (1967)
- As if by Magic (1973)
- Setting the World on Fire (1980)

=== Short story collections ===
- The Wrong Set (1949)
- Such Darling Dodos (1950)
- A Bit Off the Map (1957)
- Death Dance (selected stories, 1969)

=== Play ===
- The Mulberry Bush (1955)

=== Others ===
- Emile Zola: An Introductory Study of his Novels (1952)
- For Whom the Cloche Tolls: A Scrapbook of the Twenties (1953)
- The Wild Garden or Speaking of Writing (1963)
- A Maugham Twelve (1966) (editor)
- The World of Charles Dickens (1970)
- The Mystery of Edwin Drood Penguin Classics (1974) (introduction)
- The Naughty Nineties (1976)
- Writers of East Anglia (1977) (editor)
- The Strange Ride of Rudyard Kipling: His Life and Works (1977)
- East Anglia in Verse and Prose (1982) (editor)
- Diversity and Depth in Fiction: Selected Critical Writings of Angus Wilson (1983)
- The Portable Dickens (1983) (editor)
- Reflections In A Writer's Eye: Travel Pieces by Angus Wilson (1986)

== Bibliography ==
- Conradi, Peter, Isobel Armstrong and Bryan Loughrey (editors), "Angus Wilson", Northcote House, 1997, ISBN 0-7463-0803-5.
- Drabble, Margaret. Angus Wilson: A Biography.London: Secker & Warburg, 1995. ISBN 0-436-20038-4 (Hardcover) ISBN 0-436-20271-9 (Paperback)
- Halio, Jay, "Angus Wilson", Oliver & Boyd, London, 1964.
- Stape, John Henry and Anne N. Thomas. Angus Wilson: A Bibliography 1947–1987. London & New York: Mansell Publishing, 1988. ISBN 0-7201-1872-7.
