= Anne de Vries =

Dutch teacher and author

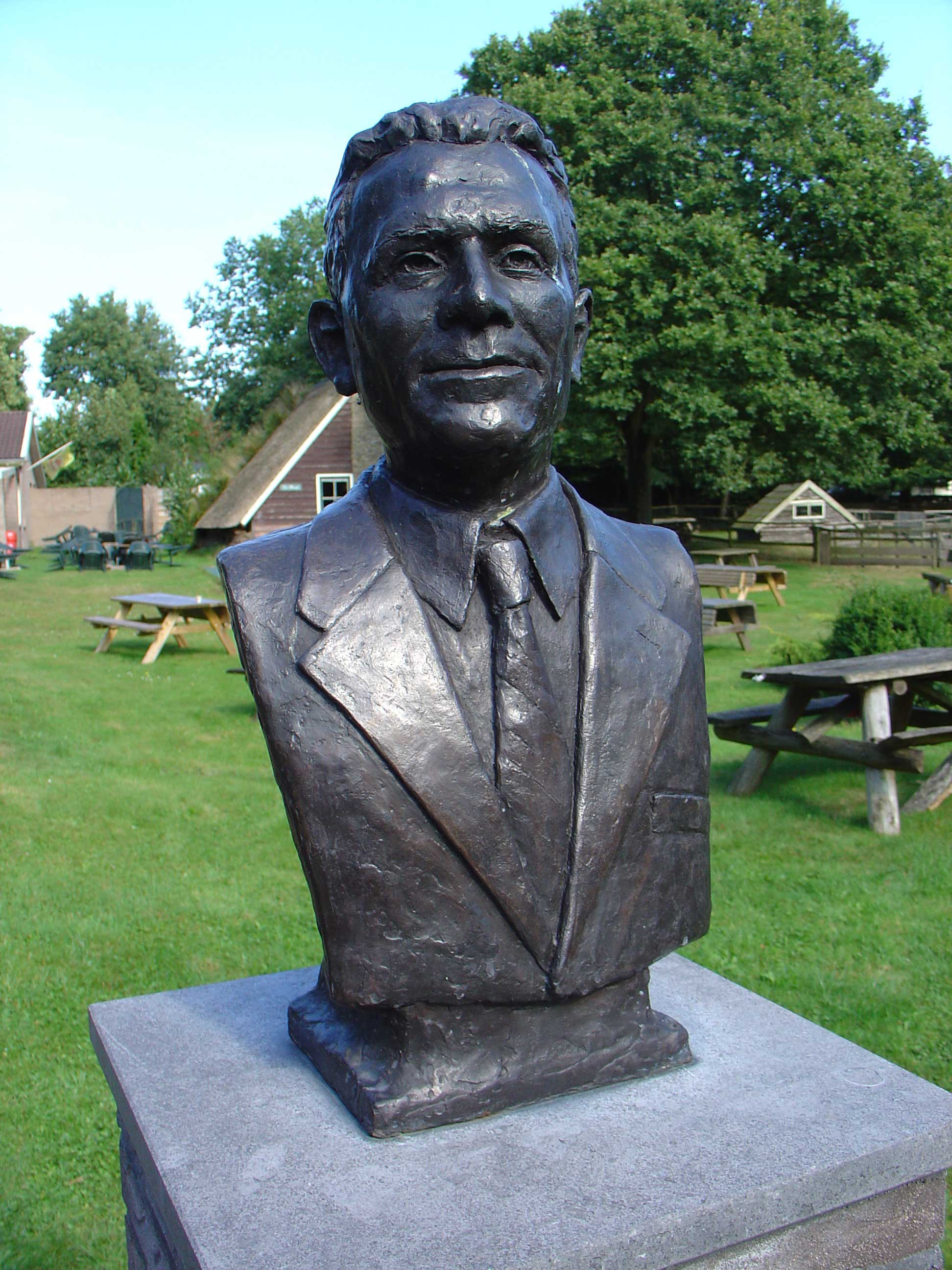
Bust of Anne de Vries at the regional museum in the village of Bartje in Rolde

Anne de Vries (22 May 1904 – 29 November 1964) was a Dutch teacher and writer, particularly famous in the Netherlands for his novels of regional life.

Born in the village of Kloosterveen near Assen, de Vries married Alida Gerdina van Wermeskerken in 1930 and the couple had five children. In 1972, de Vries gained national recognition when his novel Bartje was made into a television series by Willy van Hemert. The personnage of Bartje subsequently came to symbolize the Dutch province of Drenthe.

De Vries wrote a number of regional novels, most famously the coming-of-age novel Bartje and then Bartje Seeks Happiness. He also wrote Journey through the Night, a children's book about World War II which was published in four volumes between 1951 and 1958. His Bartje books may be considered Bildungsromane.

De Vries died, aged 60, in Zeist.

== Selected works ==
- Jongens van de straat, 1934
- Bartje, 1935
- De stroper, 1935
- Jaap en Gerdientje, 1937
- Op de grote heide, 1937
- De grote veenbrand, 1937
- Groot vertelboek voor de Bijbelse geschiedenis, 1938
- Verhalen voor Kersttijd, 1948
- Honderd vertellingen uit de bijbel, 1949
- Het boek van Jan Willem, 1950
- Reis door de nacht, 1951–1958
- De ring van de profeet (Anne de Vries and Jan Fabricius), 1952
- Kinderkleurbijbel (Oude testament), 1961
- Twee meisjes in de tropen 1964
