= One Way Pendulum (play) =

- Poster of original production
- Written by: N.F. Simpson
- Original language: English
- Genre: Absurdist farce

Premiere
- Date premiered: 14 December 1959
- Place premiered: Theatre Royal, Brighton

One Way Pendulum, described on the title page as "A Farce in a New Dimension", is a play by N. F. Simpson. It was first performed at the Theatre Royal, Brighton on 14 December 1959, before playing at London's Royal Court Theatre from 22 December, later transferring to the Criterion Theatre where it ran until 11 June 1960. The play was adapted for the cinema in 1965.

== History ==
N. F. Simpson had come late to writing plays. In 1957, when in his late thirties, his play A Resounding Tinkle had won third prize in a playwriting competition organised by Kenneth Tynan of The Observer. One Way Pendulum was Simpson's second full length play.

== Original cast ==
- Kirby Groomkirby – Roddy Maude-Roxby
- Robert Barnes – John Horsley
- Mabel Groomkirby – Alison Leggatt
- Sylvia Groomkirby – Patsy Rowlands
- Aunt Mildred – Patsy Byrne
- Myra Gantry – Gwen Nelson
- Arthur Groomkirby – George Benson
- Stan Honeyblock – Douglas Livingstone
- Judge – Douglas Wilmer
- Prosecuting Counsel – Graham Crowden
- Defence Counsel – Graham Armitage
- Policeman - Alan Gibson
- Usher - Jeremy Longhurst
- Clerk of the Court - Robert Levis

Source: N. F. Simpson, The Collected Plays, Faber & Faber 2013.

== Plot ==
Subtitled on the Royal Court's posters as "an evening of high drung and slarrit", the play is in the absurdist tradition. It contains numerous diversions and non-sequiturs, such as people riding to hounds on camels, and a game of three-handed whist played by two participants, without cards, in the dark, but the core consists of the efforts of the son of the house, Kirby, to teach a collection of talking weight machines, which he has stolen, to sing the Hallelujah chorus from Messiah, and his father's decision to build a replica of the Old Bailey in the sitting room. Elsewhere in the household Mrs Groomkirby is so obsessed with cooking that she employs a neighbour to come in twice a week to help eat the food, and the daughter, Sylvia is dissatisfied with the length of her arms. In Mr Groomkirby's home-made Old Bailey a judge and counsel appear; Kirby is put on trial for mass murder (he kills people so as to indulge his passion for wearing black mourning) and his father is discredited as a witness under cross-examination, for failing to prove that he isn't in Chester-le-Street.

== Critical reception ==
The Times found the tone of the play too relentlessly illogical to be consistently funny. Tynan took a contrasting view: "On the strength of his new play, One Way Pendulum, I suspect Mr Simpson to be the possessor of the subtlest mind ever devoted by an Englishman to the writing of farce". Later critical opinion has been that the play is probably Simpson's finest. The critic Michael Coveney commented in 2011 that the author "mixed a comic brew that derived more recognisably from the worlds of Lewis Carroll, W. S. Gilbert and the Goons."

The play had 40 performances at the East 74th Street Theater in New York City.

== Adaptations ==
The play was adapted for the cinema, under the same title, in 1964. Of the original stage cast, Alison Leggatt, Douglas Wilmer and Graham Crowden recreated their roles in the film.
