= Murphy's War =

1971 film by Peter Yates

- Theatrical poster
- Directed by: Peter Yates
- Screenplay by: Stirling Silliphant
- Based on: Murphy's War; 1969 novel by Max Catto
- Produced by: Michael Deeley
- Starring: Peter O'Toole; Siân Phillips; Philippe Noiret; Horst Janson
- Cinematography: Douglas Slocombe
- Edited by: John Glen; Frank P. Keller
- Music by: John Barry; Ken Thorne
- Production companies: Hemdale; Michael Deeley-Peter Yates Films
- Distributed by: Paramount Pictures
- Release date: 13 January 1971
- Running time: 107 minutes
- Countries: United Kingdom; United States
- Languages: English; German
- Budget: $5 million

Murphy's War is an Eastmancolor 1971 Panavision war film starring Peter O'Toole and Siân Phillips. It was directed by Peter Yates, based on the 1969 novel by Max Catto. The film's cinematographer was Douglas Slocombe.

The film is set in Venezuela during World War II and focuses on Murphy, a stubborn survivor of a sunken merchant ship who is consumed in his quest for revenge and retribution against the Nazi German submarine that sank his ship and slaughtered the survivors.

== Plot ==
In the closing days of World War II, Irish crewman Murphy is the sole survivor of the crew of merchant ship Mount Kyle, which had been sunk by a Nazi German U-boat and the survivors machine-gunned in the water. Murphy reaches the shore and finds a missionary settlement on the Orinoco in Venezuela, where he is treated by the pacifist Quaker Dr. Hayden.

When Murphy discovers that the U-boat is hiding farther up river under the cover of the jungle, he obsessively plots to sink it by any means, including by using a surviving Grumman J2F Duck floatplane from the Mount Kyle. Lieutenant Ellis, the floatplane's wounded pilot was shot dead in his hospital bed by the U-boat captain in order to preserve the secret of the submarine's location. Murphy tries to fly the aircraft on the choppy river water and learns how to manipulate the controls by trial and error. He soon finds the U-boat's hiding place and attempts to bomb it using homemade Molotov cocktail bombs but his effort fails and the mission settlement is destroyed in retaliation.

Word comes that Germany has surrendered but Murphy is obsessed with revenge and plans to ram the U-boat with a floating crane owned by Louis Brezon, a friendly Frenchman. This attempt also fails when the U-boat dives under him. However, the submerged U-boat is ensnared in a mud bank. Murphy uses the crane to recover an unexploded torpedo fired earlier by the U-boat and drops it on the trapped crew, killing them. Murphy is also killed as the explosion from the torpedo causes the crane jib to pin him to the deck as the floating crane sinks to the river bed.

== Cast ==
- Peter O'Toole as Murphy
- Siân Phillips as Dr. Hayden
- Philippe Noiret as Louis Brezon
- Horst Janson as Commander Lauchs
- John Hallam as Lieutenant Ellis
- Ingo Mogendorf as Lieutenant Voght
- Harry Fielder as German Sub Crewman
- George Roubicek as U-boat Crewman

== Production ==
=== Development ===
Film rights to the novel by Max Catto were purchased by Paramount Pictures. In 1969, Frank Sinatra was recruited to star in the film but he withdrew from the project. Eventually Robert Evans, head of Paramount, offered the project to the team of Peter Yates and Michael Deeley, who had made Robbery for the studio. Deeley says a script had already been written by Stirling Silliphant, who worked on subsequent drafts with Yates. Silliphant later recalled:

Our purpose was to make a flat-out statement about the absurdity, the meaninglessness, of war. So we went for minimal sound, minimal dialogue, a kind of intense fumbling toward death, toward the showdown between enemies who have no further reason for enmity except the blind stupidity and vengefulness of the Peter O’Toole character. And this is why, at the end, in a high angle shot director Peter Yates closed out the film with the sub sinking, the barge sinking, and the river surging above both, covering them for all eternity. Over this he shot a ragged flight of jungle birds, wheeling off, the only survivors of this pointless encounter between men and their machines.

Yates said that he was particularly interested in "the way in which three people—Murphy, a doctor and a Frenchman left in the backwash of war—are really brought together by circumstance and how each character plays on the other and makes them do things that they wish they hadn't and things they sometimes feel proud of."

Deeley has said that Paramount became less enthusiastic about the project as time passed. Since he and Yates had a pay-or-play contract, Evans offered them the chance to make The Godfather (1972) but Yates turned it down in order to make Murphy's War. Eventually Paramount agreed to provide half of film's financing in exchange for world-distribution rights. The other half of the budget came from London Screenplays, a finance company from Dimitri de Grunwald.

The lead role of Murphy was given to Peter O'Toole for a fee of $250,000. A number of other stars had turned it down including Warren Beatty, Robert Redford and Lee Marvin. His female co-star was his real-life wife Siân Phillips. The couple had appeared together in the 1964 film Becket and the 1969 musical film Goodbye, Mr. Chips. O'Toole wanted to play an Irishman so the script was rewritten accordingly.

Murphy is one of his ship's officers in the novel but his film counterpart is a mechanic for the seaplane. The character of Lieutenant Ellis (John Hallam) is not featured in the novel. Dr. Hayden (Phillips) is a composite of several doctors from the novel. Louis Brezon (Philippe Noiret) is a self-loathing deserter from the French military in the book but a jovial company man in the film.

The submarine crew is portrayed more sympathetically in the novel. Most of them are war-weary and apolitical, save for Lieutenant Voght (Ingo Mogendorf), who seizes command and murders Murphy's crew while the captain is incapacitated by a head wound. The book's end is quite different to that of the film. In the book, when Murphy drops the torpedo, it splits the sub in half and inadvertently allows most of the trapped crewmen to swim to the surface and survive. An injured Vought cannot reach shore and is carried away by the current to his death. Murphy also avoids death during the crane operation. Murphy and Captain Lauchs (Horst Janson) briefly fight each other on the beach before sinking to the ground in exhaustion.

=== Production ===
Filming began on 23 February 1970 and was completed with location shooting in Malta on 5 July. Filming occurred at locations in the regions of Puerto Ordaz and Castillos de Guayana on the Orinoco River in Venezuela and on set at Pinewood Studios, Iver Heath and Twickenham Film Studios, Middlesex, England. Deeley described the shoot as the toughest of his career, which led to the breakup of his partnership with Yates, with whom he had made several films.

For the scenes filmed in Malta that depict the burning of the merchant ship, O'Toole swam through water afire with oil and with explosives detonating all around him. He later said: "I used to do all my own stunts when I first started. I made it a principle. Everything in Lawrence of Arabia I did myself. But after suffering a paralyzed hand, a bad back, broken ankle and countless knocks, I decided never again. It was stupid. Films employ stunt men (for a reason!). They can do these things far better than I. I refused to do any more stunts. [Then] I thought, well, just one more time. So I talked myself into it. In Venezuela I even fly a seaplane. If you want to see a picture of sheer terror have a look at the shots of me when I first fly that seaplane."

Deeley viewed the film as an action adventure and says he wanted Murphy to live at the end of the film but Yates insisted he die and to make the film more of an anti-war statement. Several of the sequences were photographed by cinematographer Douglas Slocombe, including the scenes with Murphy piloting the floatplane and the visuals along the Orinoco River. Especially notable is an airborne shot of a flock of scarlet ibises in flight along the shore of the river during the closing credits. For the extensive flying scene with many shots of the floatplane stalling and veering sharply to avoid obstacles, a camera was strapped to the wing of the aircraft. Several Peace Corps volunteers serving in towns near the Orinoco River were recruited to play Nazi submariners. The volunteers donated their daily wages to the Venezuelan school districts or other organizations with which they were working.

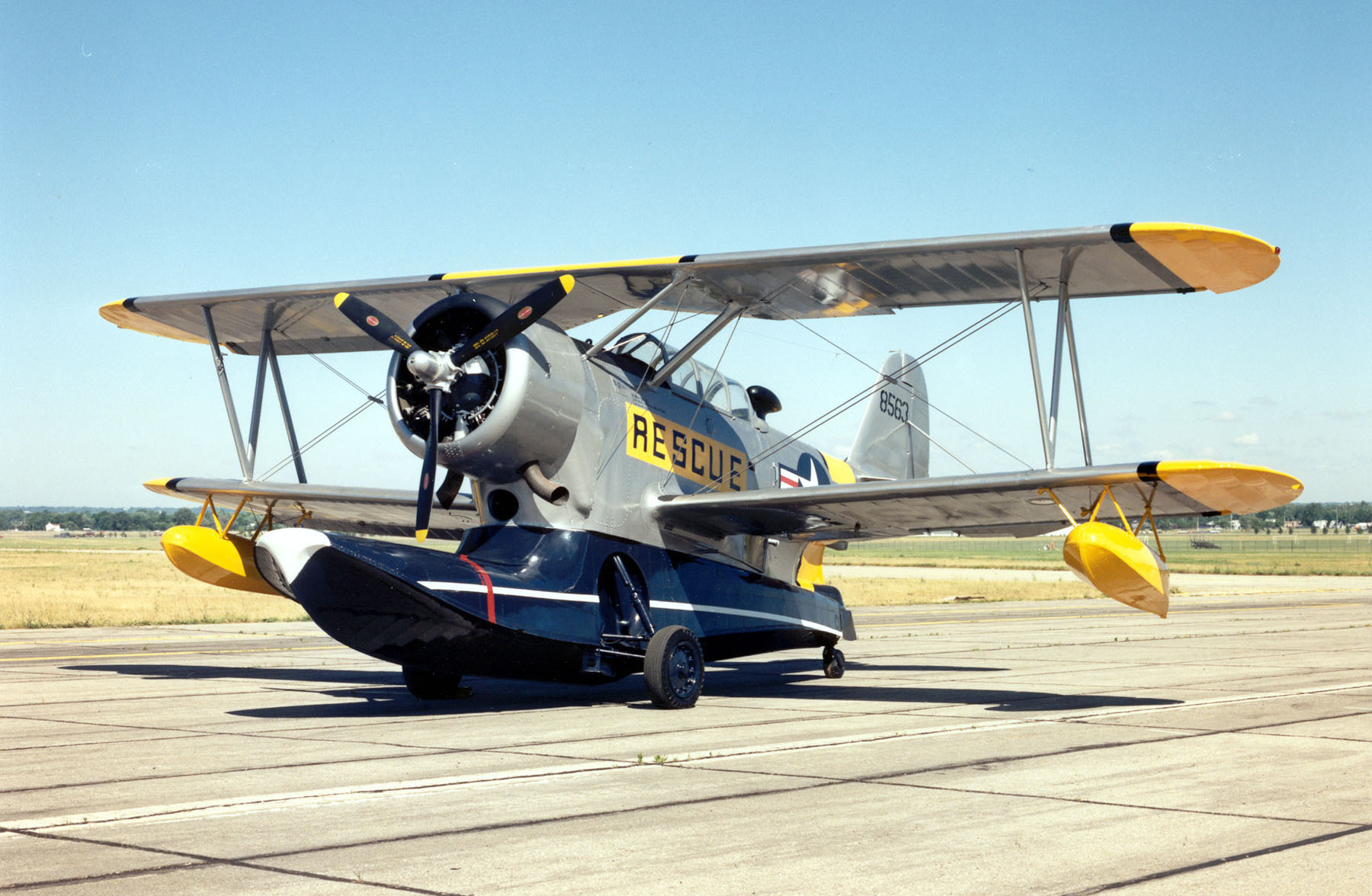
The restored Grumman OA-12 Duck from the film, at the National Museum of the United States Air Force

The Type IX U-boat was represented by the Venezuelan Navy's ARV Carite (S-11); this was the former USS Tilefish, which had been sold to Venezuela in 1960 (the submarine is far taller than a wartime U-boat, and its single gun position behind the conning tower makes it look like a Type VII U-boat). The floating crane was a former World War II tank landing craft. The OA-12 Duck used in the film was restored and flown by Frank Tallman and is on display at the National Museum of the United States Air Force at Wright-Patterson Air Force Base in Dayton, Ohio. In the original book, the aircraft was a Fairey Swordfish.

== Release ==
The film had its world premiere on 13 January 1971 at the Odeon Leicester Square.

== Reception ==
Murphy's War was not successful among critics or at the box office. Deeley later wrote "From the vantage of today the film looks dated: nothing more than a string of cliched scenes, centring on a cliched character. The aerial photography still looks good, at least. But at the time my chief emotion was, 'Finally, it's over…'."

Roger Greenspun's review in The New York Times centered on the awkwardness of the plot: "The sense of a film in which nothing quite works with anything else pervades Murphy's War, and it extends from such crucial technical details as the sloppy and finally tedious cross-cutting… to the playing together of the principal actors." A review in Variety stated: "By no means a film classic, Murphy's War stands out as the kind of good, solid entertainment needed these days to fill houses." Gene Siskel of the Chicago Tribune awarded the film two stars out of four and called it "an adventure story high in production values but low in suspense."

Charles Champlin of the Los Angeles Times wrote: "The story proceeds from the detestable to the improbable by way of the uninteresting. Rarely will you see a major motion picture so flat and devoid of tone or atmosphere." Gary Arnold of The Washington Post called the film "a dim, self-defeating adventure movie" with a screenplay "at peculiar cross-purposes with itself…" A review in the New York Daily News praised O'Toole's performance but called the film a "sluggish action spectacle."
