= Hell Is a City (novel) =

1954 novel

- First edition
- Author: Maurice Procter
- Language: English
- Series: Harry Martineau
- Genre: Crime
- Publisher: Hutchinson (UK); Harper (US)
- Publication date: 1954
- Publication place: United Kingdom
- Media type: Print
- Followed by: The Midnight Plumber

Hell Is a City is a 1954 crime novel by the British writer Maurice Procter. It was the first in a series featuring Chief Inspector Harry Martineau, set in the Northern industrial city of Granchester. It takes the form of a police procedural, and marked a transition away from the traditional Golden Age detective novel. Published by Hutchinson, it was released in the United States by Harper the same year under the alternative title Somewhere in This City.

== Film version ==
In 1960 the novel was adapted into a British film of the same title directed by Val Guest and starring Stanley Baker, John Crawford and Donald Pleasence.

== Bibliography ==
- Dove, George N. The Police Procedural. Popular Press, 1982.
- Goble, Alan. The Complete Index to Literary Sources in Film. Walter de Gruyter, 1999.
- Herbert, Rosemary. Whodunit?: A Who's Who in Crime & Mystery Writing. Oxford University Press, 2003.
- Reilly, John M. Twentieth Century Crime & Mystery Writers. Springer, 2015.
- Vicarel, Jo Ann. A Reader's Guide to the Police Procedural. G.K. Hall, 1995.
