= Rich Is the Treasure =

1952 novel

- Author: Maurice Procter
- Language: English
- Series: Philip Hunter
- Genre: Crime
- Publisher: Hutchinson
- Publication date: 1952
- Publication place: United Kingdom
- Media type: Print

Rich Is the Treasure is a 1952 crime novel by the British writer Maurice Procter. It is the second in a trilogy featuring Scotland Yard Detective Superintendent Philip Hunter, which he wrote alongside the better known series featuring Chief Inspector Harry Martineau. The plot revolves around a gang creating counterfeit diamonds.

== Film adaptation ==
In 1954 it was adapted into the film The Diamond directed by Montgomery Tully and starring Dennis O'Keefe, Margaret Sheridan, and Philip Friend. It was distributed by United Artists in both Britain and America where it was released as The Diamond Wizard, a title the book is sometimes also known by.

== Bibliography ==
- Goble, Alan. The Complete Index to Literary Sources in Film. Walter de Gruyter, 1999.
- Hubin, Allen J. Crime Fiction, 1749-1980: A Comprehensive Bibliography. Garland Publishing, 1984.
- Reilly, John M. Twentieth Century Crime & Mystery Writers. Springer, 2015.
