= The Diamond (film) =

1954 British film by Montgomery Tully

- American theatrical release poster
- Directed by: Montgomery Tully
- Screenplay by: John C. Higgins
- Based on: Rich Is the Treasure; 1952 novel by Maurice Procter
- Produced by: Steven Pallos; Charles Leeds
- Starring: Dennis O'Keefe; Margaret Sheridan; Philip Friend
- Cinematography: Arthur Graham; Gordon Lang
- Edited by: Helga Cranston
- Music by: Matyas Seiber
- Color process: Black and white
- Production company: Gibraltar Films
- Distributed by: United Artists
- Release dates: 26 April 1954 (UK); 16 July 1954 (US)
- Running time: 83 minutes
- Country: United Kingdom
- Language: English

The Diamond is a 1954 British film noir crime film directed by Montgomery Tully (possibly jointly with Dennis O'Keefe), and starring Dennis O'Keefe, Margaret Sheridan and Philip Friend. The screenplay was by John C. Higgins, based on the 1952 novel Rich Is the Treasure by Maurice Procter. It was released by United Artists in Britain and in America, where it was known as The Diamond Wizard.

It is notable for being Britain's first 3D film, though according to the British Film Institute, it was shown in 3D only once, on 13 September 2006 in Hollywood. Despite the 2006 showing the film was listed on the BFI 75 Most Wanted list of lost films. The 2D film, however, is not lost and can be viewed on Amazon Prime while the restored 3D version was released on Blu-ray in November 2022.

== Plot ==
After a gang pulls off a heist to acquire freshly minted dollars, American Treasury Agent Joe Dennison pursues their trail to London. Dennison and Scotland Yard detective Hector McClaren attempt to break a racket involving the production of synthetic diamonds.

== Cast ==
- Dennis O'Keefe as Joe Dennison
- Margaret Sheridan as Marline Miller
- Philip Friend as Inspector Hector McClaren
- Alan Wheatley as Thompson Blake
- Francis de Wolff as Yeo
- Eric Berry as Hunziger
- Michael Balfour as Hoxie
- Gudrun Ure as Sergeant Smith
- Paul Hardtmuth as Dr. Eric Miller
- Colin Tapley as Sir Stafford Beach
- Donald Gray as Commander Gilles
- Cyril Chamberlain as Castle
- Seymour Green as Lascelles
- Betty McDowall as Sergeant Graves
- Alastair Hunter as Dr. Cully
- Paul Carpenter as Mickey Sweeney
- Philip Lennard as Sergeant Hunter
- Victor Wood as Sam, fingerprint technician
- Molly Weir as Mrs. Sayer
- Frank Forsyth as P.C. with taxi driver
- Patrick Jordan as first Fox & Hounds detective
- Gordon McLeod as Paul Hawkins
- Arthur Mullard as police informer
- Wensley Pithey as police sergeant

== Production ==
The film was shot at Walton Studios with location filming taking place in London and Hertfordshire. The film's sets were designed by art director Denis Wreford. It was produced by the independent British company Gibraltar Films for release by United Artists.

There is conflicting information about who directed The Diamond. According to the British Film Institute website the British release credited British B-picture veteran Montgomery Tully as director, while the US release credited the film's American star, Dennis O'Keefe. However, the US print viewed by the reviewer of the American Film Institute Catalog of Motion Pictures credits Tully, while a YouTube video with the opening credits of a print bearing the British release title credits O'Keefe.

== Critical reception ==
Monthly Film Bulletin said "The deeply involved plot is strewn with red herrings to such an extent that the film becomes more baffling than entertaining, and never rises above commonplace B picture level. The Diamond was originally shot in 3-D, but the version shown is flat."

Kine Weekly said "The picture, originally made in 3-D, very nearly talks itself to a standstill during the early stages, but allows no grass to grow under its feet as it approaches its vivid pyrotechnic climax. Flames lick the good and the bad lads, and few will resist cheering when the rescue party puts in an appearance and the villain is consumed in the inferno. The leading characters display admirable composure in the most testing circumstances, and the stout portrayals of Dennis O'Keefe, Philip Friend and Margaret Sheridan as Joe, McClaren and Marlene, do much to mellow the rough stuff. Authentic Scotland Yard detail, too, acts as a cushion. In a word, "The Diamond " should cut some ice with the crowd, if not the intelligentsia."

In British Sound Films: The Studio Years 1928–1959 David Quinlan rated the film as "average", writing: "Intricately developed thriller, though only the end is exciting. Originally made for 3D, but shown 'flat'."

Leslie Halliwell said: "Leaden cops-and-robbers which went out on the bottom of the bill instead of being shown in three dimensions."

The Radio Times Guide to Films gave the film 2/5 stars, writing: "A rare UK venture into 3D, this crime programme filler was shot in a process called Spacemaster. ... Mostly shown in its flat format, the film was jointly directed by its star and Montgomery Tully, who was something of a dab hand at atmosphere-free mysteries."
