= David Hart (political activist) =

British political activist (1944–2011)

- Born: 4 February 1944; Paddington, London, England
- Died: 5 January 2011 (aged 66); Bury St Edmunds, England
- Resting place: Great Maplestead
- Education: Eton College
- Occupations: Novelist, film director, businessperson, political advisor, political activist, property developer, farmer, playwright
- Political party: Conservative Party

David Hart (4 February 1944 – 5 January 2011) was an English writer, businessman, and adviser to Margaret Thatcher. He also had a career in the 1960s as an avant-garde filmmaker. He was a controversial figure during the 1984–85 miners' strike and played a leading role in organising and funding the anti-strike campaign in the coalfields.

== Early life ==
Born at St Mary's Hospital in Paddington, London, on 4 February 1944, David Hart was the elder of the two sons of Anglo-Jewish businessman Louis Albert Hart, the chairman/principal shareholder of the Henry Ansbacher merchant bank, which had been founded by Henry Ainsley né Ansbacher.

Hart was educated at Eton until his expulsion in his fourth year. In the mid- to late 1960s, he made several avant-garde films and was in the circle of Bruce Robinson (Withnail and I). On A Game Called Scruggs (1965) he worked with Raoul Coutard, regular cinematographer for Jean-Luc Godard, and was described by producer Michael Deeley as "the English Godard".

By now, Hart had begun to work in property, a field in which he became a millionaire by the late 1960s. Living extravagantly, he declared himself bankrupt in 1974, owing £960,000 by the time of the 1975 hearing, although this was discharged in 1978. A later inheritance restored his fortunes, but he did not repay his earlier debts.

== Political advisor ==
By the late 1970s, he was involved in Conservative Party politics and the Centre for Policy Studies think-tank. He wrote speeches for Archie Hamilton MP, a friend from Eton.

In the early 1980s Thatcher involved Hart in negotiations with the Ronald Reagan US administration regarding their "Star Wars" Strategic Defense Initiative.

During the miners' strike of 1984–85 he was an unpaid advisor to Thatcher, the National Coal Board and its chair Ian MacGregor. He was a controversial figure during the miners' strike (the government distanced themselves from him as soon as his services were no longer needed) and was instrumental in organising and funding the anti-strike campaign in the coalfields, including funding a breakaway miners union, the Union of Democratic Mineworkers (UDM). His involvement in aiding working miners extended to employing former members of the SAS to protect the families of working miners and using the resources of 'the secret state'. Hart's involvement was eventually a source of bitterness for the UDM's leader Roy Lynk.

In 1987 he formed the Campaign for a Free Britain, "an extreme right wing organization", funded by Rupert Murdoch, which at one point called for "the legalization of all drugs", and which had used "anti-gay material during their anti-Labour campaign in 1987". In 1988 he played a leading role in mobilising young activists against pro-devolution dissidents at the Scottish Conservative and Unionist Party conference in Perth, Scotland.

Towards the end of Hungarian socialism, Hart channelled support from the West to the fledgling Fidesz party, which at the time was an unofficial anti-Communist student movement developing at the Eötvös Loránd University under the protection of the last Communist minister of the interior, István Horváth. The group received a visit and material support from George Soros by 1985. It was formally founded in 1988, changed into a party in 1989, and by 1990 its members were part of Hungary's new parliament.

In the autumn of 1993, he was appointed as a personal advisor to Malcolm Rifkind, Secretary of State for Defence, a position Hart retained when Michael Portillo succeeded Rifkind. Reportedly a long-standing Portillo contact, Hart is credited with writing the 'Who Dares Wins' conclusion to Portillo's 1995 Conservative Party Conference speech. He was also involved in the 1995 plan to install 40 telephones and fax machines in a Lord North Street house for a Portillo leadership challenge to Conservative leader and prime minister John Major which never emerged.

In the 2000s he was involved in the international defence industry – including being a lobbyist for BAE Systems and Boeing. In 2004 an arrest warrant for Hart was issued concerning his alleged involvement in that year's coup attempt in Equatorial Guinea. In 2007 The Guardian newspaper alleged Hart had received £13 million in secret payments from BAE, via Defence Consultancy Ltd, an anonymously registered company based in the British Virgin Islands. While BAE was under investigation for corruption at the time, Hart was not thought to have done anything illegal.

== Cultural depictions ==
In 2004 the author David Peace published the novel GB84, a "fiction based on a fact" of the miners' strike. The book's most controversial feature was Stephen Sweet, who is referred to throughout by his driver as "The Jew", a vain and obsessive character allegedly based on Hart.

However, in Francis Beckett and David Henckes' study on the miners' strike, Marching to the Fault Line, Hart features more as light relief. Hart is also portrayed as a central protagonist on the government's side in Beth Steel's 2014 play Wonderland.

Hart himself wrote numerous plays, including Victoriana, The Little Rabbi, The Ark & the Covenant, and two novels, The Colonel and Come to the Edge.

== Personal life ==
Hart lived in some style in Suffolk; first at Coldham Hall (near Stanningfield), Bury St Edmunds and then at nearby Chadacre Hall in Shimpling.

Hart was the father of five children, three sons and two daughters, by four women; the four mothers were Christina Williams (whom he married on 21 October 1976), Karen Weis, Hazel O'Leary, and Kate Agazarian. In an article for The Daily Telegraph in June 2009, Hart revealed that he had been living with primary lateral sclerosis, a form of motor neurone disease, since 2003. He died of pneumonia at West Suffolk Hospital in Bury St Edmunds on 5 January 2011, aged 66, and was buried at Great Maplestead in Essex on 17 January.

== Filmography ==
- Sitting Quietly, Doing Nothing, Spring Comes and the Grass Grows by Itself – short film
- A Game Called Scruggs (1965) – featurette starring Susannah York
- Sleep Is Lovely (a.k.a. The Other People, 1968) – feature film
