= Man in Ambush =

1958 novel

- First edition (US)
- Author: Maurice Procter
- Language: English
- Series: Harry Martineau
- Genre: Crime
- Publisher: Hutchinson; Harper (US)
- Publication date: 1958
- Publication place: United Kingdom
- Media type: Print
- Preceded by: The Midnight Plumber
- Followed by: Killer At Large

Man in Ambush is a 1958 crime novel by the British writer Maurice Procter. It is the third in his series featuring Chief Inspector Harry Martineau, set in the Northern industrial city of Granchester. It takes the form of a police procedural. Published by Hutchinson, it was released in the United States by Harper & Row the following year.

== Synopsis ==
Martineau sets out to try and hunt down the killer of his colleague Inspector Robert McQuade. However he soon faces attempts on his own life and a scheme to frame him for taking bribes.

== Bibliography ==
- Dove, George N. The Police Procedural. Popular Press, 1982.
- Herbert, Rosemary. Whodunit?: A Who's Who in Crime & Mystery Writing. Oxford University Press, 2003.
- Reilly, John M. Twentieth Century Crime & Mystery Writers. Springer, 2015.
- Vicarel, Jo Ann. A Reader's Guide to the Police Procedural. G.K. Hall, 1995.
