= Where's Jack? =

1969 British film by James Clavell

- Directed by: James Clavell
- Written by: Rafe Newhouse; David Newhouse
- Produced by: Stanley Baker
- Starring: Stanley Baker; Tommy Steele
- Cinematography: John Wilcox
- Edited by: Peter Thornton
- Music by: Elmer Bernstein
- Production company: Oakhurst Productions
- Distributed by: Paramount British Pictures
- Release date: 1 April 1969
- Running time: 120 minutes
- Country: United Kingdom
- Language: English
- Budget: $3 million

Where's Jack? (also known as Run, Rebel, Run) is a 1969 British adventure film directed by James Clavell and starring Stanley Baker and Tommy Steele. It was written by Rafe Newhouse and David Newhouse and produced by Baker for his company Oakhurst Productions.

Mary Hopkin sings the title song.

== Plot ==
The film recounts the exploits of notorious 18th-century criminal Jack Sheppard and London "Thief-Taker General" Jonathan Wild. The ending of the film is ambiguous, and suggests that Sheppard may have survived his execution and escaped to the Americas.

== Cast ==
- Tommy Steele as Jack Sheppard
- Stanley Baker as Jonathan Wild
- Alan Badel as The Lord Chancellor
- Dudley Foster as Blueskin
- Fiona Lewis as Edgworth Bess Lyon
- Sue Lloyd as Lady Darlington
- Noel Purcell as Leatherchest
- Eddie Byrne as Rev. Wagstaff
- Michael Elphick as Hogarth
- Howard Goorney as surgeon
- John Hallam as the captain
- Harold Kasket as The King
- Caroline Munro as Madame Vendonne
- Cardew Robinson as Lord Mayor
- George Woodbridge as hangman

== Production ==
Financing was provided by Paramount. According to producer Michael Deeley, this was obtained after a pitch made by Martin Baum, Stanley Baker's agent, to Charles Bludhorn, owner of Paramount. Baum described the film as being written by the writers of Point Blank (1967), produced by the maker of Zulu (1963) and directed by the man who made To Sir, with Love (1967) which, combined, made a profit of $45 million. Divided by four, that would have meant a profit of over $10 million after the $3 million cost was deducted. The pitch was successful, and Deeley says it remains one of his happiest memories in getting a film funded.

Peter Bart, an executive at Paramount at the time, says Stanley Baker did the presentation with Deeley and Baum. Bart says Bludhorn believed that expensive films made the most money and was attracted to Where's Jack? in part by its cost, agreeing to finance without reading a script. He also claims that Deeley presented him with the relatively inexpensive The Italian Job and that Bart arranged for it to be financed without telling Bludhorn; Italian Job would go on to be a far more successful film.

Peter Yates said at the time that Stanley Baker was "rescuing" Tommy Steele from Hollywood musicals "to do some acting again". The film was announced in February 1968.

Filming took place in Ireland in June 1968. It finished by September.

== Reception ==
=== Box office ===
Where's Jack? was a box office flop. The film was not released in the US after performing poorly in Europe. According to Filmink, this failure "undid much of the good work of Robbery and The Italian Job."

=== Critical ===
The Monthly Film Bulletin wrote: "Handsomely mounted, expensively cast, and with a familiar enough story, Where's Jack? has on paper all the requirements for a smash box-office hit on the lines of Tom Jones, and presumably the makers had just this in mind. But something is missing – a touch of panache, a particle of real inspiration, perhaps even simply an element of good honest vulgarity ... James Clavell's direction is at times pedestrian, some of the acting is wooden, and there is a very perceptible sag in the middle of the film. This said, there is much to enjoy along the way ... Among the performances Stanley Baker's Wild stands out, though he brings perhaps a little too much complexity to the role of a dyed-in-the-wool villain. Tommy Steele copes well enough with the relatively simple demands made of him (though occasionally presenting a somewhat hangdog Jack), and Fiona Lewis at least looks her part to perfection, all melting eyes and bouncing bosom. But the real acting honours go to Dudley Foster and Noel Purcell as Jack's devoted companions .... All in all, an enjoyable if not consistently successful introduction to the predicted new wave of historical romances."

The Los Angeles Times wrote that it was "astonishingly similar, markedly better" to another film about a highwayman that came out around the same time, Sinful Davey.
