= Pride of the Blue Grass =

Pride of the Blue Grass may refer to:

- Pride of the Blue Grass (1939 film), an American film directed by William C. McGann
- Pride of the Blue Grass (1954 film), an American film directed by William Beaudine
