= The Other People =

Sleep Is Lovely
- Olga Georges-Picot and Donald Pleasence in a scene from the film
- Directed by: David Hart
- Written by: David Hart; Michael Josef
- Produced by: Stanley Baker; Michael Deeley
- Starring: Peter McEnery; Donald Pleasence
- Cinematography: Brian Probyn
- Edited by: Peter Pitt
- Music by: Johnny Dankworth
- Production companies: Oakhurst Productions; Paramount Pictures; Telstar Productions
- Release date: 1968
- Running time: 89 minutes
- Country: United Kingdom
- Language: English
- Budget: £80,000

The Other People (also known as Sleep Is Lovely and I Love You, I Hate You) is a 1968 British film directed by David Hart and starring Peter McEnery, Donald Pleasence and Olga Georges-Picot. It was written by Hart and Michael Josef. The film appears to have never been released, and is considered a lost film.

== Plot ==
Peter can't get over his ex-girlfriend Elsa even though they broke up over a year ago. He spends all his time on a barge owned by his friend John and John's younger brother Colin. One morning Peter, John and Colin see a middle aged man, Clive, fall out of a motor cruiser into the water. They rescue him and decide to ransom him for £1,000. Peter and Elsa are-reunited but Elsa then commences an affair with Colin. Clive turns out to be Elsa's father.

== Cast ==
- Peter McEnery as Peter
- Donald Pleasence as Clive, Elsa's father
- Olga Georges-Picot as Elsa
- John McEnery as John
- George Coulouris as police inspector
- Bruce Robinson as Colin
- Colin Jeavons as butler
- William Ellis as Royal Marines officer
- Virginia Wetherell as girl at airport

== Production ==
Producer Michael Deeley said director David Hart "was one of the cleverest men I have met and when he decided to be a film director it seemed like a good idea for me to help him." The film was set up at Deeley's Oakhurst Productions and financed by Paramount Pictures as part of a low-budget film state ordered by the studio's new owner, Charles Bluhdorn.

The film was passed to the BBFC for certification in September 1968, but despite the cast involved and backing of Oakhurst Productions and Paramount Pictures, it does not appear to have had a trade screening, been shown to a paying audience, screened on TV or released on video.

== See also ==
- List of lost films
