= A Fear of Strangers =

1964 British TV film by Herbert Wise

- Directed by: Herbert Wise
- Written by: Leon Griffiths
- Starring: Stanley Baker; Earl Cameron; Garfield Morgan
- Release date: 1964
- Running time: 60 minutes
- Country: United Kingdom
- Language: English

A Fear of Strangers is a 1964 British TV drama starring Stanley Baker, who portrays a racist police inspector who attempts to coerce a black suspect into confessing to a murder he did not commit. Although written in 1958 it was banned for six years. The program was produced by Associated Television (ATV) and aired as an installment of Drama 64.
