= Committee for a Free Britain =

UK political pressure group

The Committee for a Free Britain (also known as the Campaign for a Free Britain) was a right-wing political pressure-group in the United Kingdom. Its introductory letter to all MPs, and others, stated that it was "formed in the run up to the 1987 General Election by Baroness Cox, the 6th Lord Harris (1920–1995), Downing Street Policy Unit member Christopher Monckton, and novelist and journalist David Hart".

== Development ==
The CFB's first public act was to place advertisements in national newspapers warning the country of the consequences of a Labour victory in the 1987 General Election.

David Hart, the CFB's chairman, was active in the miners' strike, supporting miners who opposed strike action. Hart became a personal political advisor to Ian MacGregor then-Chairman of the National Coal Board and a close friend of Hart's brother.

In time for the October 1988 Conservative Party Conference, the CFB published a booklet entitled British Foreign Policy - The Case for Reform, featuring a photo on the front cover of Foreign Secretary Geoffrey Howe giving the clenched-fist salute at a political meeting in southern Africa. In the pamphlet's conclusion it stated that "The Foreign Office is one of the last of the great British institutions that has escaped the refreshing breath of Thatcherism." Howe maintained he had not been giving a black power salute, however, merely that he had been swatting a fly.

The London magazine City Limits (20 October 1988) gave extensive coverage to what they called the "Tories' Loony Fringe" activities at the Conservative Conference at Brighton that month, and reported extensively on the CFB's extravagant reception, described as a 'celebration' on the invitation, but in CFB pamphlets as the "Margaret Thatcher Birthday Spectacular". Hart, as well as Richard Perle, former US Assistant Secretary of Defense, addressed the audience of conference delegates and M.P.s, which included Lord Young and Malcolm Rifkind. Perle described the December 1987 Intermediate-Range Nuclear Forces Treaty between Ronald Reagan and Mikhail Gorbachev as a stunning rebuke to the unilateralists, and expressed scepticism about Gorbachev. Hart attacked Geoffrey Howe and the Foreign Office's attitude to the Soviet Union as "appeasement".

== After 1988 ==
The Committee for a Free Britain was still active in 1991, when a full-page advertisement for it, opposing the European Union but supporting free markets, appeared in the Conference edition of Commentary, the glossy magazine of the Conservative Graduates'.

== Other sources ==
- "Who's Afraid of Laissez Faire?" by David Hart, 1980. (Published & distributed by The Monday Club) ISBN 0-903900-05-X.
- End Compulsory Membership of the National Union of Students, Policy Paper for the Committee for a Free Britain, 1987.
- Czarnecki, Richard, The Democratic Opposition in Poland, published by the Committee for a Free Britain, 1988, (P/B).
- "Hart's Desire", interview in The Spectator magazine, London, 15 October 1988.
- British Foreign Policy - The Case for Reform, Policy booklet produced especially for distribution at the Conservative Conference by the CFB, October, 1988, (P/B).
- City Limits magazine, London, 20 October 1988.
- Britain's National Health Service - Terminally Ill, Policy Paper for the Committee for a Free Britain, October 1988.
- Speaking to the People - Communicating the Conservative Message, Policy Paper for the Committee for a Free Britain, October 1988.
