= Maurice Procter =

English novelist (1906–1973)

- Born: 4 February 1906; Nelson, Lancashire, England
- Died: 28 April 1973 (aged 67); Royal Halifax Infirmary
- Education: Nelson Grammar School
- Occupation: Police officer. Novelist

Maurice Procter (4 February 1906 – 28 April 1973) was an English novelist. He was born in Nelson, Lancashire, England.

== Early life ==
Maurice Procter was born in Nelson, Lancashire, on 4 February 1906. His parents were Rose Hannah and William Procter, a weaver, who had two other sons, named Edward, nicknamed Ned, and Emmot. The family lived in Charles Street, Edward and Maurice attended Nelson Grammar School before running away to join the army at age 15. He had lied about his age so his parents tried to secure his release from the army, but even with the support of their local MP they were unsuccessful. After the army Maurice worked briefly as a weaver in a Lancashire cotton mill.

In 1927 Maurice joined the police as a constable in Halifax, Yorkshire. At that time a policeman was not allowed to serve in his home town, and he was based at King Cross police station in Halifax, and initially lodged at the station. Later he lodged at 24 Cromwell Street, Halifax with electrician Arthur Edwin Blakey and his wife Isabella who was in service, working as a cook at Heathfield House, Rishworth, near Halifax. The couple had three daughters, Phyllis, Eve and Winifred. Maurice married the youngest daughter, Winifred, in 1933 at Saint Mary's Church, Lister Lane, Halifax.

During the war Maurice was transferred from King Cross to Mixenden police station. In those days Mixenden was just a small village, so Maurice was the village bobby and he and his wife lived in the police house for 5 years. Maurice and Winifred had one child, a son named Noel. In total, Maurice served in the Halifax police force for 19 years, remaining a constable throughout the time. At that time Halifax had its own police force, with its own chief constable and its own headquarters on Harrison Road, so there were few opportunities for postings to different parts of the police force. Maurice did, however, spend some as a motor cycle patrol officer and was involved in one notorious local criminal case, that of the Halifax Slasher in the 1930s.

For most of his life in Halifax, Maurice and his family lived at 20 Willowfield Road, in the Pye Nest area of Halifax and only a short distance from the King Cross police station. Experiencing police procedure at first hand provided the realism in Procter's work, that many reviewers praised.

He began writing fiction whilst a serving police officer. His first book No Proud Chivalry was published in 1947 and as soon as he was earning an income from writing he resigned from the police force. Much of his work was written in the study of his home in Willowfield Road, though in later years he and his wife spent part of the year in Spain and Gibraltar.

When not writing, Maurice enjoyed his hobbies which were reading, gardening, playing cards, motor cycling and socialising with friends.

Procter is best known for his series of police procedural novels featuring Detective Chief Inspector Harry Martineau of the Granchester City Police. In his novels Granchester was an industrial city in the north of England. Procter based the city on Manchester. When his novel Hell Is a City (which was published in the United States with the title Somewhere in This City) was filmed in 1960 with Stanley Baker as Martineau, it was shot on location in Manchester.

== Death ==
Maurice Procter died in the Royal Halifax Infirmary on 24 April 1973.

== Publication ==
=== Novels ===
Title	Year of publication
No Proud Chivalry	(1947)
Each Man's Destiny	(1947)
The End of the Street	(1949)
Hurry the Darkness	(1952)
The Pub Crawler	(1956)
Three at the Angel	(1958)
The Spearhead Death	(1960)
Devil in the Moonlight	(1962)
The Dog Man	(1969)

=== Series ===
Philip Hunter

Title	Year of publication
The Chief Inspector's Statement aka The Pennycross Murders	(1951)
Rich Is the Treasure aka The Diamond Wizard	(1952)
I Will Speak Daggers aka The Ripper / Ripper Murders	(1956)

Chief Inspector Martineau Investigates

Title	Year of publication
Hell Is a City aka Somewhere in This City	(1954)
The Midnight Plumber	(1957)
Man in Ambush	(1958)
Killer At Large	(1959)
Devil's Due	(1960)
The Devil Was Handsome	(1961)
A Body to Spare	(1962)
Moonlight Flitting aka The Graveyard Rolls	(1963)
Two Men in Twenty	(1964)
Death Has a Shadow aka Homicide Blonde	(1965)
His Weight in Gold	(1966)
Rogue Running	(1966)
Exercise Hoodwink	(1967)
Hideaway	(1968)

== Sources ==
- Maurice Procter at Fantastic Fiction
- Arrow Books
