= When the Lion Feeds =

1964 novel by Wilbur Smith

- First edition
- Author: Wilbur Smith
- Language: English
- Series: The Courtney Novels
- Publisher: Heinemann
- Publication date: 1964
- Publication place: South Africa
- ISBN: 978-0333902158
- Followed by: The Sound of Thunder

When the Lion Feeds (1964) is the debut novel of Rhodesian writer Wilbur Smith. It introduces the Courtney family, whose adventures Smith told in many subsequent novels. In 2012, Smith said the novel remained his favourite because it was his first to be published.

== Plot ==
The novel begins in Natal in the 1870s, with the introduction of twin brothers Sean and Garrick, the sons of ranch owner Waite Courtney. After one of Sean's hunting accidents results in Garrick losing his leg, a guilt-ridden Sean becomes Garrick's protector, with Garrick later manipulating Sean's guilt for his own benefit. Sean and Garrick are both expelled from school after Sean assaults a teacher who attacked Garrick in order to antagonize Sean, after which Waite hires the two to work for him.

Sean, Garrick and Waite all participate in the Anglo-Zulu War. Waite is killed in battle, and Sean is later presumed dead after getting caught in an ambush. Garrick meanwhile becomes a war hero after inadvertently preventing the Zulus from forcing their way into a makeshift hospital ward, earning the Victoria Cross for his efforts.

Upon learning that Sean's girlfriend Anna is pregnant, Garrick marries her to prevent her giving birth out of wedlock. The two fail to consummate their marriage due to Garrick proving to be impotent, and when they return, Sean is revealed to have survived after escaping the ambush and subsequent pursuit with the help of Mbejane, a Zulu who turned against his people after his father was murdered by supporters of Cetewayo. Anna tries to return to Sean, but he refuses her due to her marriage to Garrick, even after learning that she bears his child. A bitter Anna fakes being raped by Sean, turning Garrick against his brother, though Sean assumes that she told Garrick the truth of her pregnancy.

Sean and Mbejane travel north, where they meet Duff Charleywood, an assistant mining engineer. After learning of the discovery of gold on the Witwatersrand, Sean and Duff agree to pool their resources to make their fortunes in the subsequent gold rush. Buying land off of Candy Rautenbach, a hotel owner who Duff becomes engaged to, the pair soon establish a profitable gold mine for themselves and become millionaires. Before long the pair are two of the wealthiest individuals on the Witwatersrand, second only to Jewish diamond tycoon Norman Hradsky and his business partner Max, the former of whom Duff pursues a personal rivalry with owing to Hradsky's similarities to his overbearing father.

Despite this antagonism, Sean, Duff and Hradsky work together for mutual profit, setting up a stock exchange in Johannesburg alongside the other mine owners, and eventually merging their companies into a single enterprise, Central Rand Consolidated. During this time Sean gradually loses his moral compass, helping to drive another entrepreneur to financial ruin and suicide, and later forcing Mbejane to wear a livery.

He returns to normal after being trapped in a cave-in and saved by his workers, during which time he resolves never to hurt another if he can help it. Duff deserts Candy the morning before their wedding, fearing it will just be a repeat of his miserable first marriage, and returns to the Witwatersrand a few months later. Shortly afterwards, Sean and Duff are tricked out of their CRC shares and fortunes by Hradsky (albeit by using their own greed against them), and Sean decides to leave Johannesburg.

Sean, Duff and Mbejane travel into the bushveld to hunt for ivory. During this time, Duff is bitten by a rabid jackal and contracts rabies, eventually forcing Sean to shoot him. After grieving for his friend, he encounters the Lerouxs, an Afrikaner family also hunting in the Bushveld, and falls in love with their youngest daughter, Katrina. The pair of them later marry and have a child, who they name Dirk Courtney.

Shortly afterwards, Katrina contracts black water fever, and Sean travels back to Johannesburg to enable her to recover. While there, Katrina mistakenly assumes that Sean misses his old life there, and wrongly suspects Candy to be a mistress of Sean's after seeing them interact with one another. Considering herself a failure as a wife, she commits suicide. Though affected by his grief, Sean resolves to keep living for Dirk's sake, and he heads back into the bushveld to collect enough ivory to pay for a farm, as he and Katrina had talked about doing.

== Background ==
Before publishing The Lion Feeds, Smith was working as an accountant and had already written a novel, The Gods First Make Mad, for which he had been unable to find a publisher.

Dejected, he returned to work as an accountant, until he received a telegram from Ursula Williams, his agent in London enquiring as to progress on his new novel. Encouraged by her expectation that he would be writing another novel the urge to write once again overwhelmed him. After thinking about possible storylines he commenced work in 1962 on another novel:

I wrote about my own father and my darling mother. I wove into the story chunks of early African history. I wrote about black people and white. I wrote about hunting and gold mining and carousing and women. I wrote about love and loving and hating. In short I wrote about all the things I knew well and loved better. I left out all the immature philosophies and radical politics and rebellious posturing that had been the backbone of the first novel. I even came up with a catching title, 'When the Lion Feeds'.

After reading the 160,000 word manuscript Smith's agent in London, Ursula Winant, rang Charles Pick the deputy managing director of William Heinemann and convinced him to look at the novel. She also asked for an advance of £500 and a guaranteed initial print run of 5,000 copies, and that it was to be published before Christmas. Pick was so impressed after reading the first chapter of the novel over the weekend that he gave it to the company's sales director Tim Manderson, who agreed that it should be published. Pick rang Winant and offered an advance of £1,000, with an initial print run of 10,000 copies. By the publication date Heinemanns had increased the print run to 20,000.

The book went on to be successful, selling around the world (except in South Africa, where it was banned). The novel was serialized by the BBC and the Reader's Digest produced a condensed version. Its success enabled Smith to leave his job and become a full-time author. Charles Pick, who bought the book for Heinemann, later became Smith's mentor and agent.

Smith dedicated the book to his father, whom the author idolized. "When I showed him he was a bit taken aback but Mum said that he always used to carry it around with him to show his mates", said Smith.

The character of Waite Courtney was modelled on Smith's grandfather Courtney James Smith.

After 10,000 copies had already been sold in South Africa the novel was banned by the Publication Control Board on the grounds of obscenity and blasphemy. As his publisher Heinemann appealed the decision to the Cape Division of the South African Supreme Court. Smith however funded the legal action as he didn't want to burden them with the cost. Before the court the Publication Control Board claimed that the reason it had banned the novel was because it had the,

tendency to deprave or corrupt the minds of persons who are likely to be exposed to the effect or influence thereof. It is offensive and harmful to public morals. It is likely to be outrageous or disgusting to persons who are likely to read it. It dealt in an improper manner with promiscuity, passionate love scenes, sexual intercourse, obscene language, blasphemous language, sadism and cruelty.

The case had to be heard twice as the original two-judge bench couldn't agree. The subsequent three-judge bench overturned the Publication Control Board's decision by two to one, though the chief judge commented on the book's "poor literary quality". However, the Publication Control Board was given leave to appeal which they did to the Appellate Division in Bloemfontein, where it was reversed on appeal by a majority of three of the five-judges bench on 26 August 1965, and the ban stayed. Once again Smith's writing received a lashing with the chief justice being of the opinion that it was not "a publication for any select circle of mature literary connoisseurs" and further claimed that,

Making due allowances for the trends of our time, there are passages which I consider calculated to incite lustful thoughts and to stimulate sexual desire in at least a substantial number of persons: ordinary men and women, of normal mind and reactions, including some of the younger generation, who will be the probable readers of this book.

The novel was finally unbanned in South Africa 11 years after its publication.

Smith did not originally envision the Courtney family would become a series, but he ended up continually returning to them in later novels.

== Proposed adaptation ==
Stanley Baker bought the film rights and announced plans to make a movie version after Zulu (1963), but no film resulted.

== Critical reception ==
Filmink magazine argued the characters of Sean and Garrick "represented the two sides of Wilbur Smith – who he wanted to be (Sean) and who he feared he was (Garrick) – because you see the dynamic played over in his novels again and again: the strong brother and the weak brother."
