= Neil Greatrex =

Neil Greatrex (1 April 1951, Basford, Nottinghamshire, England – 9 July 2019) was an English miner, trade unionist, fraudster and president of the Union of Democratic Mineworkers (UDM).

== Early life ==
He attended Greenwood Drive Junior School and Mowlands Intermediate School in Kirkby-in-Ashfield. He then went to Ashfield Comprehensive School (Ashfield School, Kirkby-in-Ashfield).

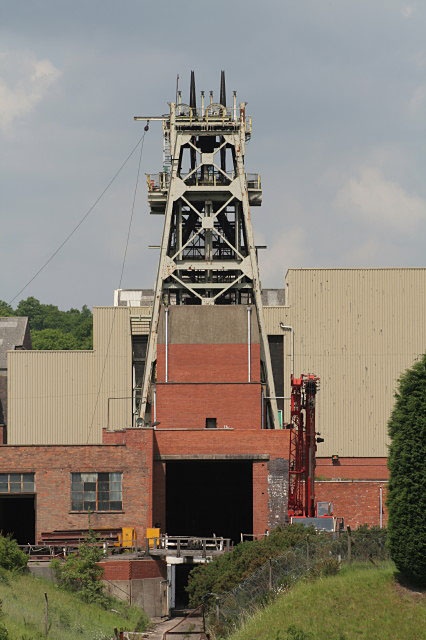
Welbeck Colliery in June 2008

== Career ==
From a mining family, his grandfather, father, and three older brothers also worked as miners, one of his first jobs at the pit was working with the pit ponies.

He worked at Bentinck Colliery, on the B6018 in the south-west of Kirkby-in-Ashfield, from 1965 to 1985.

=== UDM ===
The UDM was formed in 1985 after the miners' strike led to a split from the National Union of Mineworkers.

=== Fraud trial ===
With Mick Stevens (UDM general secretary), Greatrex appeared in court on 20 May 2011, accused of stealing almost £150,000 from a fund intended to help sick miners. Their trial began in March 2012. Greatrex abused his position as a trustee of the fund by paying for work on his own home.

On 3 April 2012 the jury found Greatrex guilty of all 14 charges, they found Stevens not guilty. Greatrex was advised by the judge to expect a custodial sentence. He was jailed for four years.

In December 2012, Birmingham Crown Court ordered Greatrex to repay over £200,000.

== Personal life ==
He married Sheila Waterhouse in 1972 and had two daughters. He lived in Teversal.

Greatrex died on 9 July 2019 from complications of a brain haemorrhage.

Trade union offices
Preceded by Roy Lynk	President of the UDM; 1993–2009	Succeeded by
