= Roy Lynk =

Roy Lynk OBE (born 9 November 1932) was a leader of the Union of Democratic Mineworkers.

== Early life ==
He was born in Chesterfield where his parents had married in 1932. He grew up in Sutton-in-Ashfield, attending Station Road Higher School and Healdswood School in Skegby. He would later receive a Certificate in Industrial Relations from the University of Nottingham.

== Career ==
He went down the pit aged 14 at Teversal Colliery in 1947. He left mining in 1979. He was Branch Secretary of the National Union of Mineworkers at Sutton Colliery from 1958-79.

=== UDM ===
At the start of the UK miners' strike (1984–85) on 6 March 1984, following a dispute at Cortonwood, Nottinghamshire's coal mining industry was second only to that of Yorkshire, with 32,000 miners; during the strike around 2,000 of those Nottinghamshire miners went on strike. On 12 March 1984, Yorkshire striking miners massed at Harworth Colliery to picket, and also on 14 March 1984 at Sutton Colliery.

He replaced Henry Richardson as General Secretary of the Nottinghamshire area of the NUM in March 1984. The Nottinghamshire area left the NUM on 7 July 1985. The UDM was formed in December 1985, by him and David Prendergast. It received financial assistance from David Hart.

He was on a committee of the European Coal and Steel Community from 1988-93.

=== UK coal mining industry ===
In October 1992 Michael Heseltine announced the closure of 32 of the UK's 53 remaining pits. British Coal, formed in 1987 from the NCB, was privatised by the Coal Industry Act 1994 and in England the pits became RJB Mining, later UK Coal. In 1991 the UDM had plans to buy British Coal. In October 1992 he held a week-long hunger strike protest at Silverhill Colliery.

== Personal life ==
He was appointed an OBE in the 1990 New Year Honours list. He married in 1978 in Mansfield and had three sons and three daughters.

== Cultural references ==
Lynk is mentioned by name ("Close the pits, sanctify Roy Lynk an OBE") in the second verse of the Manic Street Preachers song "Gold Against the Soul" (from the 1993 album of the same name).

== See also ==
- Coal Authority, headquartered in Mansfield

Trade union offices
Preceded by New union	President of the UDM; 1987–1993	Succeeded by Neil Greatrex
