= Code Name: Heraclitus =

- Written by: Alvin Sapinsley
- Directed by: James Goldstone
- Starring: Stanley Baker; Leslie Nielsen; Jack Weston; Sheree North
- Music by: Johnny Mandel
- Country of origin: United States
- Original language: English

Production
- Producers: Jack Laird; Gordon Oliver
- Cinematography: Bud Thackery
- Running time: 88 minutes
- Production companies: Morpics; Universal

Original release
- Release: January 18 – January 25, 1967

Code Name: Heraclitus is a 1967 American thriller film starring Stanley Baker and Leslie Nielsen. The film originally was a television pilot that appeared as two episodes of Bob Hope Presents the Chrysler Theatre on January 18–25, 1967.

== Plot ==
Stanley Baker stars as a British spy who investigates the past of Lydia Constantine (Signe Hasso), the widow of secret agent Constantine (Kurt Kasznar). Lydia is suspected of selling Cold War secrets to the Soviet Union. To ascertain the truth, it is necessary to "rebuild" agent Constantine and send his living counterpart behind the Iron Curtain. When agent Constantine is "rebuilt" he doesn't remember anything.

== Cast ==
Stanley Baker: Frank G. Wheatley
Leslie Nielsen: Fryer
Jack Weston: Gerberman
Sheree North: Sally
Kurt Kasznar: Constantine
Signe Hasso: Lydia Constantine
Ricardo Montalbán (credited as Ricardo Montalban): Janáček

== See also ==
- List of American films of 1967
