= Rush Job =

- Written by: Denis Constanduros
- Directed by: Douglas Allan
- Starring: Stanley Baker; Julien Mitchell; Rachel Gurney; Iris Williams
- Country of origin: United Kingdom
- Original language: English

Production
- Running time: 90 mins
- Production company: BBC

Original release
- Network: BBC
- Release: 1951

Rush Job is a 1951 British television film starring Stanley Baker, Julien Mitchell, Rachel Gurney, and Iris Williams. It was a drama set in an explosives factory.

== Reception ==
The Wokingham Times called it "interesting and very suitable for TV". The Evening Standard said the makers did "a fine unrushed job of creating the atmosphere of a factory under tension" but disliked some of the language.
