= Colosseum and Juicy Lucy =

1970 British film by Tony Palmer

- Frame from the film
- Directed by: Tony Palmer
- Produced by: Stanley Baker; Timothy Burrill
- Starring: Colosseum; Juicy Lucy
- Production company: Oakhurst Productions
- Release date: 1970
- Running time: 33 minutes
- Country: United Kingdom
- Language: English

Colosseum and Juicy Lucy is a 1970 British short concert film directed by Tony Palmer and featuring performances of the bands Colosseum and Juicy Lucy. It was produced by Stanley Baker and Timothy Burrill for Oakhurst Productions.

== Cast ==
- Pete Drummond – commentary
- Colosseum
  - Jon Hiseman
  - Dick Heckstall-Smith
  - Tony Reeves
  - Dave Greenslade
  - Dave 'Clem' Clempson
- Juicy Lucy
  - Chris Mercer
  - Neil Hubbard
  - Keith Ellis
  - Rod Coombes
  - Paul Williams
