= One Minute to Zero =

1952 film by Tay Garnett

- Original film poster
- Directed by: Tay Garnett
- Written by: William Wister Haines; Milton Krims
- Produced by: Edmund Grainger; Howard Hughes
- Starring: Robert Mitchum; Ann Blyth; Charles McGraw; William Talman
- Cinematography: William E. Snyder
- Edited by: Robert Belcher
- Music by: Victor Young
- Production company: RKO Radio Pictures
- Distributed by: RKO Radio Pictures
- Release dates: August 12, 1952 (Colorado Springs, Colorado); September 3, 1952 (Los Angeles); September 19, 1952 (New York)
- Running time: 105 minutes
- Country: United States
- Budget: $2,181,000
- Box office: $1.6 million (U.S. rentals)

One Minute to Zero is a 1952 American romantic Korean War film directed by Tay Garnett and starring Robert Mitchum and Ann Blyth. It marked Howard Hughes' final film as a producer.

== Plot ==
Just prior to the North Korean invasion of South Korea, World War II U.S. Army veterans Colonel Steve Janowski and Sergeant Baker teach South Korean soldiers how to use a bazooka to stop an enemy tank. Linda Day of the United Nations assists refugees in the area. Janowski warns Day and her colleagues to leave the area because hostilities are imminent. Day insists that the North Koreans would not risk the wrath of the world's condemnation opinion, but Janowski counters by asking whether it had stopped Hitler.

Janowski and Air Force colonel Joe Parker find themselves under an attack that reminds them of that on Pearl Harbor. Janowski takes command of an army unit that is evacuating Americans and refugees. He falls in love with Day, but she is reluctant to become involved with a soldier because she is the widow of a Medal of Honor recipient.

Janowski is confronted by a column of refugees who have been infiltrated by armed North Korean guerrillas, and he believes that he has no choice but to order an artillery strike. He is remorseful for the civilian casualties and Day condemns him for killing innocent people. However, when she learns the reason behind Janowski's action, she apologizes.

Janowski leads a successful American counteroffensive.

== Cast ==
Robert Mitchum and Charles McGraw

- Robert Mitchum as Col. Steve Janowski
- Ann Blyth as Linda Day
- William Talman as Col. John Parker
- Charles McGraw as Sgt. Baker
- Margaret Sheridan as Mary Parker
- Richard Egan as Capt. Ralston
- Eduard Franz as Gustav Engstrand
- Robert Osterloh as Major Davis
- Robert Gist as Major Carter
- Stuart Whitman as Officer (uncredited)
- Kathleen O'Malley as Mrs. Norton
- Wallace Russell as Pilot Norton
- Eddie Firestone as Lt. Stevens (uncredited)
- Peter Thompson as Lt. Cronin (uncredited)
- Steve Flagg as Lt. Martin (uncredited)
- Ted Ryan as Pvt. Noble (uncredited)
- Larry Stewart as Pvt. Weiss (uncredited)
- Lalo Ríos as Pvt. Chico Mendoza (uncredited)
- Hal Baylor as Pvt. Jones (uncredited)
- Tom Carr as Pvt. Clark (uncredited)

== Production ==
The film's working title was The Korean Story. Ted Tetzlaff was the first director assigned by RKO Radio Pictures but was replaced by Tay Garnett because producer Edmund Grainger desired wanted a more recognizable name.

Claudette Colbert was cast in the lead female role but contracted pneumonia and withdrew. Grainger wanted Joan Crawford, but the role had been rewritten for a younger woman, which eventually became Ann Blyth.

Although RKO attempted to shoot second-unit footage in South Korea, One Minute to Zero was filmed at Fort Carson, Colorado, using troops of the 148th Field Artillery. During a break in production, Charles McGraw became involved in a fistfight with soldiers at a hotel bar and Mitchum attempted to stop it. In response, Army officials threatened to pull their support for the film, but producer and studio owner Howard Hughes intervened. Hughes received a great deal of military cooperation with the production of the film but refused to delete the refugee-massacre scene when military officials asked for its excision.

Victor Young's score for the film includes the first appearance of "When I Fall in Love" as an instrumental titled "Theme from One Minute to Zero". It later became a popular hit song for several singers, including Doris Day.

== Release ==
The film's world premiere was held in Colorado Springs, Colorado on August 12, 1952, with Mitchum and Blyth in attendance. They also performed at Camp Carson and participated in a parade.

== Reception ==
In a contemporary review for The New York Times, critic Bosley Crowther wrote: "Like a great many war pictures, this one is patly contrived with elements not only of romance but also of melodrama, comedy, and tears. ... 'One Minute to Zero' is a ripely synthetic affair, arranged to arouse emotions with the most easy and obvious clichés. And, although some of the battle talk sounds faithful and the inter-cut news shots are sincere, neither the story nor the performances of the actors, including Miss Blyth and Mr. Mitchum, rings true. Here is another war picture that smells of grease paint and studios."

Critic Edwin Schallert of the Los Angeles Times wrote: "In the actual development of the wartime action 'One Minute to Zero' does not rise much above the normal level attained by productions so far dealing with the Korean conflict. It is very good, at times, in indicating how ground and air forces unite their efforts, but one has the reaction that the film could have been more thorough in its depiction of the scope of the battling."
