= After the Lion, Jackals =

- Directed by: Stanford Whitmore
- Starring: Stanley Baker; Suzanne Pleshette; John Saxon
- Country of origin: United States
- Original language: English

Production
- Running time: 60 mins

Original release
- Release: 1966

After the Lion, Jackals is an episode of Bob Hope Presents the Chrysler Theatre directed by Stanford Whitmore and starring Stanley Baker.
