= Hell Is a City =

1960 British film by Val Guest

- Directed by: Val Guest
- Screenplay by: Val Guest
- Based on: Hell Is a City by Maurice Procter
- Produced by: Michael Carreras
- Starring: Stanley Baker; John Crawford; Donald Pleasence; Billie Whitelaw; Maxine Audley
- Cinematography: Arthur Grant; Len Harris
- Edited by: John Dunsford; James Needs
- Music by: Stanley Black
- Color process: Black and white HammerScope
- Production companies: Associated British Picture Corporation; Hammer Films
- Distributed by: Warner-Pathé Distributors (UK); Columbia Pictures (US)
- Release dates: 1 May 1960 (UK); 18 January 1961 (U.S.)
- Running time: 98 minutes (UK); 93 minutes (US)
- Country: United Kingdom
- Language: English
- Budget: £115,000

Hell Is a City is a 1960 British crime thriller film directed by Val Guest and starring Stanley Baker, John Crawford and Donald Pleasence. It was written by Guest based on the 1954 novel of the same title by Maurice Procter, and made by British studio Hammer Film Productions on location in Manchester. It was partly inspired by the British New Wave films and resembles American film noir. Filming ran from 21 September 1959 to 5 November 1959, and the film was trade shown on 11 March 1960 and again on 10 April 1960. This was Stanley Baker's second and last film for Hammer, because after he appeared in Zulu (1964), Hammer could no longer afford him. It was also Val Guest's last big movie for Hammer, and he always spoke very highly of the film. An alternative ending was shot for the film featuring Stanley Baker's reconciliation with Maxine Audley at the end of the movie, but it was apparently not shown theatrically. The alternative ending was included on at least one DVD release as a bonus feature.

== Plot ==
Committed but seen-it-all police inspector Harry Martineau rightly guesses that after a violent jailbreak a local criminal will head home to Manchester to pick up the spoils from his last job. Martineau is soon investigating a murder during a street robbery which seems to lead back to the same villain. Concentrating on the case and using his local contacts to try to track the gang down, he is aware he is not keeping his own personal life together as well as he might: he wants to have children, but his wife Julia does not.

== Cast ==
- Stanley Baker as Inspector Harry Martineau
- John Crawford as Don Starling, principal criminal
- Donald Pleasence as Gus Hawkins
- Maxine Audley as Julia Martineau, wife of the inspector
- Billie Whitelaw as Chloe Hawkins
- Joseph Tomelty as Furnisher Steele
- George A. Cooper as Doug Savage
- Geoffrey Frederick as Detective Devery
- Vanda Godsell as "Lucky" Lusk
- Charles Houston as "Clogger" Roach
- Joby Blanshard as Tawny Jakes
- Charles Morgan as Laurie Lovett
- Peter Madden as Bert Darwin
- Dickie Owen as Bragg
- Lois Daine as Cecily Wainwright
- Warren Mitchell as commercial traveller
- Sarah Branch as Silver Steele
- Alister Williamson as Sam
- Russell Napier as police superintendent
- Philip Bond as headquarters police constable (uncredited)
- John Comer as plainclothes police driver (uncredited)
- John Harvey as fingerprint officer (uncredited)
- Doris Speed as older nursing sister in hospital (uncredited)

== Production ==
In a 1988 interview, Val Guest said: "Mike Carreras fell for the book, he liked it very much and gave to me to read, then he bought the rights from ABP [Associated British Picture Corporation] 'cos they were never going to make it, and we made it on location, and the whole thing was this Detective Inspector Martineau … and this very human detective, tough, rough, but human with his own problems at home, with a wife who nagged, falling for a barmaid who was part of his investigation, it was a real slice of life, putting the police down as human beings."

Guest and Stanley Baker had just made Yesterday's Enemy together.

== Critical reception ==
In contemporary reviews, Variety said "Val Guest's taut screenplay, allied to his own deft direction, has resulted in a notable film in which the characters are all vividly alive, the action constantly gripping and the background of a provincial city put over with authenticity."

Kine Weekly wrote: "The tale is fiction, but its types, expertly portrayed by a hand-picked cast – Stanley Baker adds another commanding portrait to his already long and impressive gallery as the hero – thoroughly convince, while apt asides, embracing sentiment and sex, subtly punctuate the rough stuff. ... The picture sharply cross-sections north country life and effectively employs warm sentiment and shrewd comedy touches to underline violent action, culminating in the villain's spectacular apprehension.."

The Monthly Film Bulletin wrote: "Any British crime picture that forswears the sleazy bars and pseudo-luxury flats of London and the sinister country houses of the Home Counties deserves some welcome, even if the road to the industrial North is by now well and diversely pioneered. This film may not re-create the atmosphere of Manchester any more effectively than Violent Playground (1958) did that of Liverpool, but in the coin-tossing game on the dingy moor outside a little factory town it has a most striking outdoor sequence, thanks in great measure to Arthur Grant's stark photography and the choice of extras who really look their parts. ... Elsewhere, Val Guest's script and direction maintain a hectic pace, with frequent scene changes, mobility of camera and performers, and much rapid, loud, intense dialogue, all making most recent American gangster films seem weakly constructed and slow-moving. There is a perpetual feeling of barely suppressed savagery, submerged in the excitement and rush of the early scenes, but undisguised later with a near-rape and the hunting and shooting of the deaf-mute blonde, Silver – almost the only character who is neither depraved nor at least coarsened."

Writing in The Guardian, Philip French said: "Guest's dialogue is abrasive and unsentimental, the editing (to a modern jazz score) rapid without being self-consciously smart, the accents mostly convincing."

Leslie Halliwell called the film: "Lively semi-documentary, cameo-filled cop thriller filmed on location."

In British Sound Films David Quinlan writes: "With its tough approach and patchwork of small scenes, this exciting thriller was the forerunner of much British TV cops-and-robbers to follow."

Empire said: "[Baker and Pleasence] turn in fierce performances and Guest's direction gives the movie a splendidly wrought realism, capturing a nasty underworld Britain rarely envisioned since."

Time Out said: "A persuasively sweaty crime thriller set in Manchester ... The atmosphere is persuasively seedy and downbeat, and there's a striking performance by Billie Whitelaw".

The Manchester Evening News said, "With its panoply of bantering barmaids, silver-tongued felons and lush wives, a clipped camera style and hard-boiled sensibilities (which seem a little bit Z-Cars now), Hell Is A City is probably a film which deserves to have featured more prominently in British movie memory."
