= Graceless Go I =

- Written by: David Storey
- Directed by: Patrick Dromgoole
- Starring: Stanley Baker; Ian McKellen; Angharad Rees; Rachel Roberts; Peter Sallis; Jack Watson
- Country of origin: United Kingdom
- Original language: English

Production
- Running time: 90 mins

Original release
- Release: 1974

Graceless Go I is a 1974 TV movie starring Stanley Baker, Ian McKellen, Angharad Rees, Rachel Roberts, Peter Sallis and Jack Watson.
