= Tremor (film) =

- Directed by: Denis Scully
- Release dates: 1961
- Countries: South Africa, United Kingdom

Tremor is a 1961 South African film directed by Denis Scully and co produced by Michael Deeley.
