= The Changeling (Play of the Month) =

- Play of the Month episode
- Directed by: Anthony Page
- Based on: The Changeling by Thomas Middleton and William Rowley
- Original air date: 20 January 1974

"The Changeling" is a television play episode of the BBC One anthology television series Play of the Month, starring Stanley Baker and Helen Mirren in the lead roles. The episode is an adaptation of the play The Changeling (1622), a Jacobean tragedy by Thomas Middleton and William Rowley.

== Plot ==
Beatrice-Joanna is betrothed to Lord Alonzo de Piraquo but is in love with Alsemero. She hires her father's manservant, De Flores, to kill Alonzo but after he has done so, she realises De Flores wants her as a reward.

== Cast ==
- Helen Mirren as Beatrice-Joanna
- Malcolm Reynolds as Lord Alonzo de Piraquo
- Brian Cox as Alsemero
- Stanley Baker as De Flores
