= Ingo Mogendorf =

German actor (born 1940)

Ingo Mogendorf (born 1940) is a German-born British actor, typically playing handsome and congenial German officers. He is best remembered as the Red Baron in a dogfight against Rock Hudson in Blake Edwards' Darling Lili. He worked as a male model in London in the 1970s.

== Life ==
Mogendorf was born in Germany on 2 December 1940. His exact birthplace is unclear but he certainly lived in Wuppertal in West Germany prior to coming to Britain in 1968. Based in London he appears to primarily have been employed as a model but with frequent acting roles both in film and television. He was invariably cast as the handsome and genial German and often used to contrast with more Nazi-style counterparts.

Mogendorf retired from acting in 1983/84 and moved to Puerto Banus near Marbella on the south coast of Spain, where he invested in a night-club.

== Film Roles ==
see

- Battle of Britain (1969) as pilot in Falke's crew
- Outbreak of the 28th (1970)
- The McKenzie Break (1970) as Lt Fullgrabe
- Darling Lili (1970) as Baron Manfred von Richtofen
- Murphy's War (1971) as Lt Voght
- Up the Front (1972) as Cpt Hamburger

== TV Roles ==
see

- Doctor in the House (TV series) (1969) as Jorgen
- Eyeless in Gaza (1971) as German peasant
- Dad's Army (1971) as captured Nazi pilot
- Mogul (TV series) (1971) as Sven
- The Troubleshooters (1971) as
- Marked Personal (1974) as Klaus Muller
- Spearhead (TV series) (1979) as Gerhard
- BBC2 Playhouse:Unity (1980) as Lothar
- Spy! (TV series) (1980) as Naujocks
- Born and Bred (TV series) (1980) as Traveller
- The Assassination Run (1980) as Scherer
- BBC2 Playhouse: Caught on a Train (1980) as Keliner
- Q.E.D. (TV series) (1982)
- By the Sword Divided (1983) as Ludwig
- Auf Wiedersehen Pet (1983)
- The Brief (1984) as German CID officer
