= Michael Deeley =

British film producer (born 1932)

- Born: 6 August 1932 (age 93); England
- Occupation: Film producer
- Notable work: The Italian Job; The Deer Hunter; Blade Runner

Michael Deeley's voice
from the BBC programme Desert Island Discs, 14 December 2008.

Michael Deeley (born 6 August 1932) is a British film producer. He is known for producing films such as The Italian Job (1969), The Deer Hunter (1978), which won the Academy Award for Best Picture, and Blade Runner (1982). He is also a founding member and Honorary President of the British Screen Forum.

== Early life ==
Deeley's father was a director at McCann Erickson advertising agency, and his mother was a PA to several film producers. He attended Stowe School in Buckinghamshire.

== Career ==
After serving in the Army in British Malaya, Deeley gained a job as an assistant editor at a company run by Douglas Fairbanks, Jr.

While editing the television series The Adventures of Robin Hood with his editing partner Harry Booth, the two men decided to branch into a producing partnership. They raised funds to produce a 26-minute short starring Peter Sellers and Spike Milligan, The Case of the Mukkinese Battle Horn (1956). This launched Deeley's producing career, although he did not give up his day job as editor for a few years.

In the early 1960s, Deeley worked for the UK sales arm of MCA Universal for three years, then he returned to producing with Sandy the Reluctant Nudist (1963, released 1966) and One Way Pendulum (1964). The latter was made for Woodfall Film Productions, who hired Deeley in 1964 to assist Oscar Lewenstein, a director of the company.

Deeley produced Robbery (1967), which began a partnership with Stanley Baker to make films through Oakhurst Productions. Along with Baker and Barry Spikings, Deeley also established a series of companies all called "Great Western" which did a variety of activities, including music festivals (Great Western Festivals), and investments (Great Western Investments). Great Western Investments later took over British Lion Films in 1973, and Deeley was appointed managing director of that company.

While at British Lion, Deeley oversaw the release of Don't Look Now (1973) and The Wicker Man (1973), a film he allegedly described to Christopher Lee as one of the ten worst films he had ever seen, though he himself denies this claim, and helped finance The Internecine Project, Who?, Ransom (all 1974) and Conduct Unbecoming (1975). He also produced The Man Who Fell to Earth (1976).

In 1976, after British Lion merged with EMI Films, Deeley and Spikings took over management of that company. They oversaw a series of mostly successful films including Convoy, The Driver, Death on the Nile, Warlords of Atlantis and The Deer Hunter (all 1978).

Deeley left the company in 1979 and produced Blade Runner (1982).

In 1984, Deeley was appointed CEO of Consolidated, a TV company seeking to further expand into US network television.

== Selected filmography ==
- The Adventures of Robin Hood (TV series) – editor
- The Case of the Mukkinese Battle Horn (1956) (short) – producer
- At the Stroke of Nine (1957) – producer, writer
- The Buccaneers (1958) (TV series) – editor
- OSS (1959) (TV series) – editor
- Tremor (1961) – producer
- Crosstrap (1962)
- Sandy the Reluctant Nudist (1963)
- One Way Pendulum (1964)
- The Knack ...and How to Get It (1965) – executive producer
- Robbery (1967) – producer
- Red, White and Zero (1967) – associate producer
- The White Bus (1967) – producer
- Ride of the Valkyrie (1967) (short) – associate producer
- Sleep Is Lovely (1968) – executive producer
- The Long Day's Dying (1968) – executive producer
- Where's Jack? (1969) – executive producer
- The Italian Job (1969) – producer
- Murphy's War (1971) – producer
- Conduct Unbecoming (1975) – producer
- The Man Who Fell to Earth (1976) – producer
- Convoy (1978) – executive producer
- The Deer Hunter (1978) – producer
- Blade Runner (1982) – producer
- Finnegan Begin Again (1985) (TV movie) – executive producer
- Deceptions (1985) (TV movie) – executive producer
- A Gathering of Old Men (1987) (TV movie) – executive producer
- The Secret Life of Archie's Wife (TV movie) – executive producer
- Young Catherine (1990) (TV movie) – executive producer

=== Unmade films ===
- The Last Gun (1979) – Western from Walter Hill
- The Chinese Bandit (1978) – based on script by David Shaber

== Sources ==
- Michael Deeley, Blade Runners, Deer Hunters and Blowing the Bloody Doors Off: My Life in Cult Movies, Pegasus Books, 2009.
