= Sutton Colliery =

Coal mine in Nottinghamshire, England

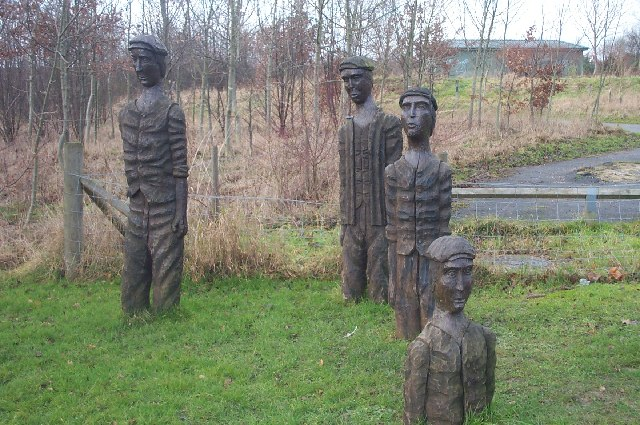
- Wooden sculptures of miners, on the colliery site

- Location in Nottinghamshire
- Location: Nottinghamshire, Nottinghamshire, England; 53°08′05″N 1°16′49″W
- Products: Coal
- Opened: 1874
- Closed: 1989
- Company: Stanton Iron and Coal Company; British Coal

Sutton Colliery was in the village of Stanton Hill, Nottinghamshire, England. It is now a country park.

== Sutton colliery ==
Sutton Colliery was known locally as "Brierley Colliery" (possibly renamed by the Staffordshire colliers who moved here from the Brierley Hill area), or the "Bread and Herring Pit" because of the poor condition of the colliery.

Two small diameter shafts were originally sunk in 1874 to a depth of 183 metres (600 ft) by the Stanton Iron and Coal Company. In the period from 1896 to 1902, the shafts were widened to 4.27 metres (14.0 ft) diameter and sunk to below the low main seam horizon at a depth of 425 metres (1,394 ft). Both shafts were brick lined throughout except for 18 metres (59 ft) of tubing at the top hard horizon in no.1 shaft.

The no.1 shaft (upcast) then commenced winding from the deep hard seam at 359 metres (1,178 ft), with an intermediate inset at the top hard level. At the same time no.2 shaft (downcast) commenced winding from the low main seam horizon. The first coals were produced from the top hard and Dunsil seams which were worked until 1922 and 1916 respectively. The available resources of the deep hard and low main seams to the south west of the shafts were exhausted by 1943. Roy Lynk was Branch Secretary of the NUM at the pit from 1958-79. The piper and deep hard seams becoming exhausted in 1989 when the colliery closed.

=== The Sutton Colliery Accident ===
On 21 February 1957 an explosion occurred in the Low Main Seam. Twenty-five men suffered multiple burns, and five men subsequently died as a result of their injuries.

== Brierley Forest Park ==
The park has a visitor centre, fishing, football pitches, children's play areas, picnicking, cycling and horse paths, bird feeding stations, an arboretum, a remembrance grove and disabled car parking. A Parkrun takes place every Saturday morning.

Brierley Forest Park was designated a Local Nature Reserve in 2006. It contains Calcareous grassland, sown grassland, wildflower meadows with hoary ragwort, yellow-wort, wild carrot and lesser trefoil. There are four wetland feature areas, Brierley Waters, a reed swamp, Rooley Brook and the visitor centre pond. There are species rich hedgerows, woodland and semi natural vegetation.
