= Sandy the Reluctant Nudist =

- Theatrical release poster
- Directed by: Stanley Pelc
- Written by: Susan Mitchell; Michael Deeley
- Produced by: Michael Deeley (credited as "M.D. Lee")
- Cinematography: Terry Maher
- Production company: Avon Productions
- Distributed by: Gala
- Release date: March 1966
- Country: United Kingdom
- Language: English

Sandy the Reluctant Nudist (also known as The Reluctant Nudist, Sandy the Reluctant Nature Girl and Sandy) is a 1966 British nudist film directed by Stanley Pelc and starring Annette Briand and Jeremy Howes. It was produced by Michael Deeley; his girlfriend wrote the script and his mother did continuity.

== Premise ==
18-year-old Sandy is supsicious when her boyfriend David is sometimes unable to see her at weekends. She hides in his car and discovers he is visiting a nudist camp where he is the star swimmer. When she is discovered, David's friends Allan and Bridget show her around the camp, and she decides to join.

== Cast ==
- Annette Briand as Sandy
- Jeremy Howes as David
- Vivienne Taylor as Bridget
- Peter Benison as Allan
- John Atkinson as detective
- Mary Chapman as Mrs. Schofield
- Constance Feeher as Mrs. Henderson
- Bertha Russell as Mrs. Dearlove

== Release ==
The film was made in 1963 but was not released until 1966.

== Reception ==
The Monthly Film Bulletin wrote: "'Within a few minutes the basic situation is presented, and anyone unable to predict what will happen some 40 minutes later would be spectacularly undiscerning. In the interim all runs its dully predictable course through feeble dialogue and acting, plus the usual coyly staid shots of activities and grouped poses by the personnel at a nudist camp – in this instance photographed at Spielplatz Camp, Hertfordshire, which here appears to be blessed with eternal sunshine."
