= Harry Martineau =

Fictional detective

- First appearance: Hell Is a City
- Last appearance: Hideaway
- Created by: Maurice Procter
- Portrayed by: Stanley Baker (film)

In-universe information
- Gender: Male
- Occupation: Police inspector
- Nationality: British

Harry Martineau is a fictional British police detective created by Maurice Procter. He is a Chief Inspector in the industrial Northern city of Granchester, which was inspired by Manchester. Procter, himself a former police officer, wrote fourteen novels in the series published between 1954 and 1968. Martineau has been described as a transitional figure in detective fiction standing between the Golden Age detectives such as Ngaio Marsh's Roderick Alleyn and Josephine Tey's Inspector Grant and the newer fashion for police procedurals.

== Novels ==
- Hell Is a City (1954)
- The Midnight Plumber (1957)
- Man in Ambush (1958)
- Killer At Large (1959)
- Devil's Due (1960)
- The Devil Was Handsome (1961)
- A Body to Spare (1962)
- Moonlight Flitting (1963)
- Two Men in Twenty (1964)
- Death Has a Shadow (1965)
- His Weight in Gold (1966)
- Rogue Running (1966)
- Exercise Hoodwink (1967)
- Hideaway (1968)

== Film adaptation ==
In 1960 the first novel in the series was adapted into the film Hell Is a City directed by Val Guest and starring Stanley Baker as Martineau. The film was shot on location in Manchester.

== Bibliography ==
- Barnes, Melvyn P. Murder in Print: A Guide to Two Centuries of Crime Fiction. Barn Owl Books, 1986.
- Goble, Alan. The Complete Index to Literary Sources in Film. Walter de Gruyter, 1999.
- Herbert, Rosemary. Whodunit?: A Who's Who in Crime & Mystery Writing. Oxford University Press, 2003.
- James, Russell. Great British Fictional Detectives. Remember When, 2009.
- Mitchell, Neil. Directory of World Cinema: Britain 2. Intellect Books, 2015.
- Reilly, John M. Twentieth Century Crime & Mystery Writers. Springer, 2015.
- Triplow, Nick. Getting Carter: Ted Lewis and the Birth of Brit Noir. Oldcastle Books,2017.
