= Oakhurst Productions =

Oakhurst Productions was a production company formed by actor Stanley Baker in the late 1960s which produced a number of films, notably The Italian Job (1969). Their first film, Robbery (1967), was made in association with Embassy Pictures but the next five were made with Paramount Pictures. Oakhurst owned a building along the Thames River which was later sold as part of Baker and Deeley's take over of British Lion.

Among their unmade projects were:

- an adaptation of the novel Flashman by George MacDonald Fraser to be directed by Richard Lester;
- Summer Fires directed by Peter Hall.
- Everyman's Brother from a novel by Norman Lewis

== Credits ==
- Robbery (1967)
- Sleep Is Lovely (1969)
- Where's Jack? (1969)
- The Italian Job (1969)
- Colosseum and Juicy Lucy (1970)
- Perfect Friday (1970)
