= Margaret Sheridan (actress) =

American actress (1926–1982)

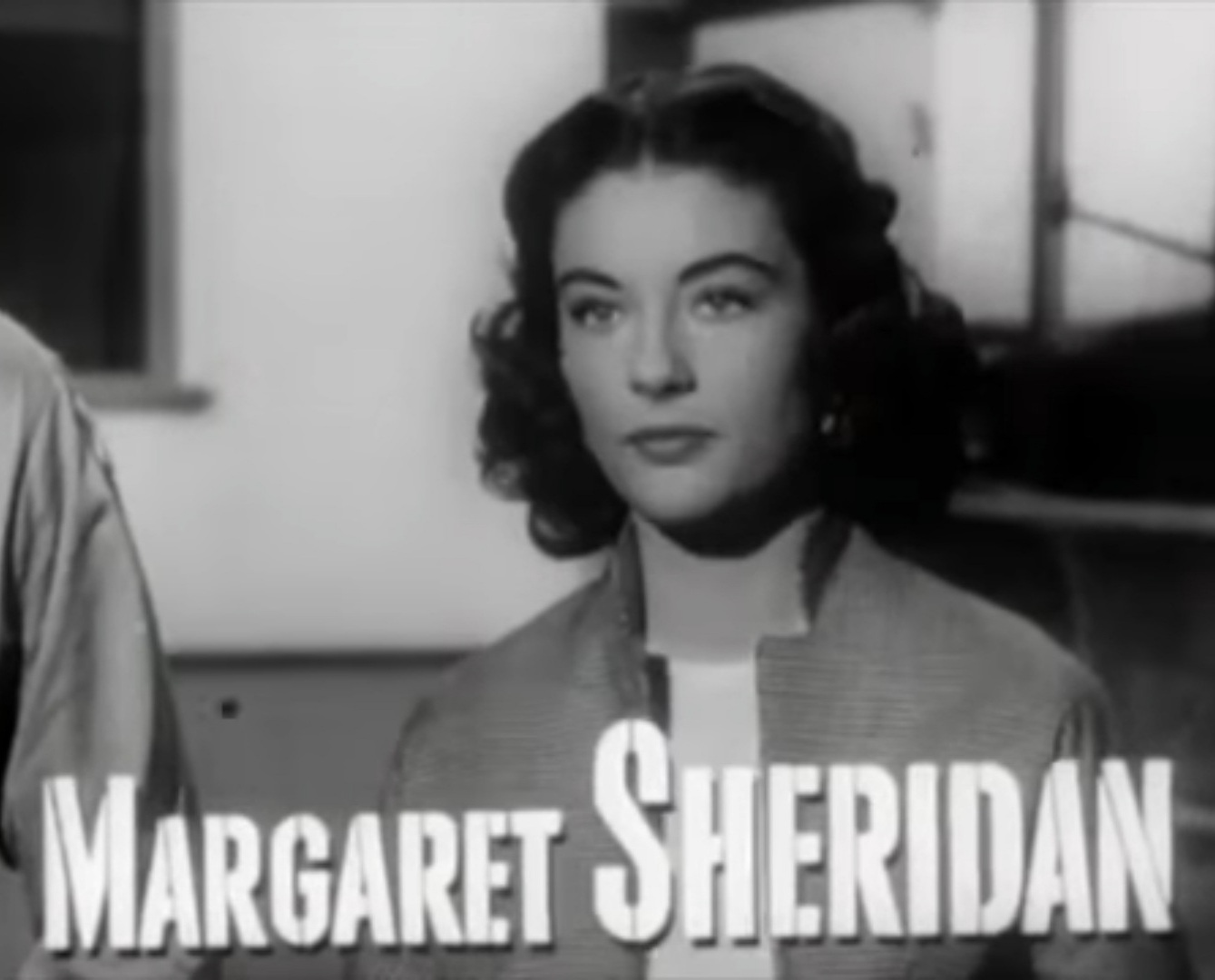
- Sheridan in the trailer for One Minute to Zero (1952)
- Born: Margaret Elizabeth Sheridan; October 29, 1926; Los Angeles, California, U.S.
- Died: May 1, 1982 (aged 55); Orange, California, U.S.
- Occupation: Actress
- Years active: 1951–1964
- Spouses: William F. Pattison (m. 1946; div. 1952) Paul Wellington Wildman (m. 1953)
- Children: 3

Margaret Elizabeth Sheridan, also known by her married name Margaret Wildman, (October 29, 1926 – May 1, 1982) was an American actress of the early 1950s, and protégée of director Howard Hawks. She is best remembered for her role as Nikki Nicholson opposite Kenneth Tobey in the 1951 science fiction classic The Thing from Another World.

== Career ==
Sheridan was born in Los Angeles, California, to Thomas Galligan Sheridan, Sr., and Julia P. Sheridan. She was discovered by Howard Hawks while she was still attending college. Initially, Hawks believed she was the most promising actress of her era.

In 1947, she married William F. Pattison, a professional airline pilot. Hawks offered Sheridan the female lead opposite John Wayne in the 1948 film Red River. Sheridan turned down the role because she was expecting the birth of her first child. Joanne Dru accepted the role.

Hawks offered her the role of Nikki Nicholson in the 1951 film The Thing from Another World. Sheridan's career suffered, and she never achieved the fame Hawks had hoped. Motherhood and a few years of maturity had evidently changed her. Hawks is quoted as saying she was just "not the same girl" he had discovered. He later commented that if she had taken the role in Red River, her career would have flourished. Sheridan would quit acting in 1955 to start a family but briefly came back in 1964.

She died at age 55 of lung cancer on May 1, 1982, in Orange, California.

== Filmography ==
Year	Title	Role	Notes
1951	The Thing from Another World	Nikki Nicholson	
1952	One Minute to Zero	Mary Parker	
1953	I, the Jury	Velda	
1954	Pride of the Blue Grass	Helen	
1954	The Diamond	Marline Miller	
1964	Man's Favorite Sport?	Maggie, Cadwalader's Secretary	Uncredited
