= Pride of the Blue Grass (1954 film) =

1954 film by William Beaudine

- Theatrical release poster
- Directed by: William Beaudine
- Written by: Harold Shumate
- Produced by: Hayes Goetz
- Starring: Lloyd Bridges; Vera Miles; Margaret Sheridan; Arthur Shields
- Cinematography: Harry Neumann
- Edited by: John C. Fuller
- Music by: Marlin Skiles
- Color process: Cinecolor
- Production company: Allied Artists
- Distributed by: Allied Artists
- Release date: April 4, 1954
- Running time: 71 minutes
- Country: United States
- Language: English

Pride of the Blue Grass is a 1954 American drama film directed by William Beaudine and starring Lloyd Bridges, Vera Miles and Margaret Sheridan. It is also known by the alternative title Prince of the Blue Grass. It was the last feature film shot in Cinecolor.

== Plot ==
Jim Nolan owns a stable of thoroughbred racehorses and employs Pop Wilson, a long-ago trainer, as a groom. Pop has a son, Danny, whose ambition is to become a jockey.

One day, Linda Mason brings her horse Gypsy Prince to the Nolan stable and ends up boarding him there, although Jim is convinced that the horse does not have the making of a champion. Linda takes a job as a waitress at the track restaurant to pay for her horse's keep.

Pop and Danny put long hours into training and riding Gypsy Prince, but just as he is about to win his first race, a bandage on the horse's leg comes loose and he stumbles before the finish line. Danny is injured and a doctor intends to euthanize the horse, but Linda talks him out of it.

After going to work for wealthy stable owner Helen Hunter, who also has a romantic interest in him, Jim at first alienates Linda, then is pleased to see that she and the Wilsons have nursed Gypsy Prince back to health. All are happily reunited after Linda's horse wins the next race.

== Cast ==
- Lloyd Bridges as Jim
- Vera Miles as Linda
- Margaret Sheridan as Helen
- Arthur Shields as Wilson
- Michael Chapin as Danny
- Harry Cheshire as Hunter
- Cecil Weston as Mrs. Graves
- Emory Parnell as Mr. Casey
- Joan Shawlee as Mrs. Casey
- Ray Walker as Veterinarian

== See also ==
- List of films about horses
- List of films about horse racing

== Bibliography ==
- Marshall, Wendy L. William Beaudine: From Silents to Television. Scarecrow Press, 2005.
