= Union of Democratic Mineworkers =

British trade union

UDM
- Union of Democratic Mineworkers
- Founded: 6 December 1985
- Dissolved: 31 March 2022 (Removed from the Certification Officer's official list or schedule of trade unions)
- Headquarters: Mansfield, Nottinghamshire, England
- Location: United Kingdom
- Members: 72 (2018)

The Union of Democratic Mineworkers (UDM) was a British trade union for coal miners based in Nottinghamshire, England, established in 1985, following the 1984–85 miners' strike, when the Nottinghamshire Area of the National Union of Mineworkers (NUM) was involved in a number of disputes with the National Executive Committee that led to a split from the NUM. In ballots on joining with Nottinghamshire in a new union, the South Derbyshire Area of the NUM voted in favour by 51% and the Colliery Workers and Allied Trades Association by almost 100%.

The Nottinghamshire Miners' Association initially remained within the National Union of Mineworkers with elected officers including Roy Lynk and Neil Greatrex, later the General Secretary of the UDM. Officials from the UDM advised ministers on how to cut miners' power – including by weakening the National Association of Colliery Overmen, Deputies and Shotfirers (NACODS).

For many NUM supporters and Arthur Scargill loyalists, the UDM was and remains considered a "scab" union due their split for the NUM, return to work and cooperation with the Thatcher government.

The UDM was widely criticised in 2004 after it was revealed that its top two officials received pay and benefits of over £150,000 each, despite membership having fallen to 1,431. In 2012, former president Neil Greatrex was found guilty of fraud from a miners' welfare fund.
