= Stanley Baker =

Welsh actor and film producer (1928–1976)

Sir Stanley Baker
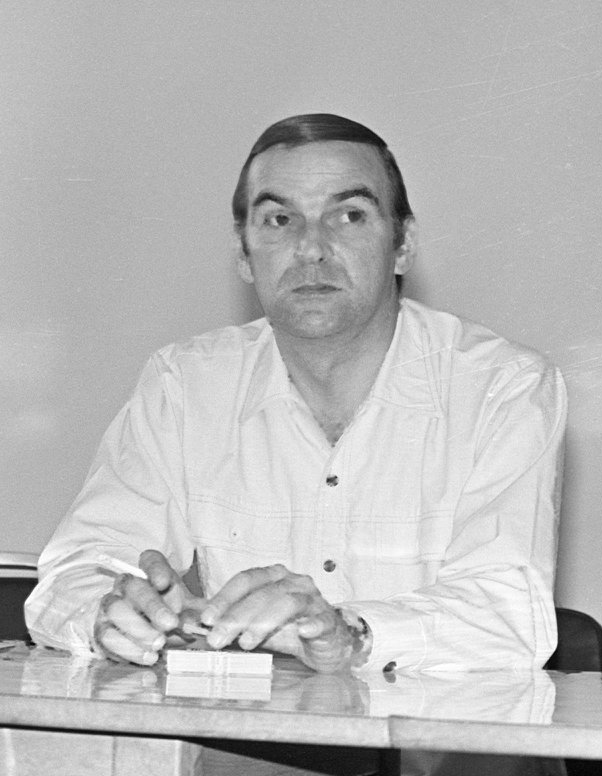
- Baker in 1967
- Born: William Stanley Baker; 28 February 1928; Ferndale, Glamorgan, (Note: Since 1996, Ferndale has been in the county borough of Rhondda Cynon Taf.) Wales
- Died: 28 June 1976 (aged 48); Málaga, Andalusia, Spain
- Occupations: Actor, film producer
- Years active: 1943–1944, 1948–1976
- Spouse: Ellen Martin (m. 1950)
- Children: 4
- Military career
- Allegiance: UK
- Branch: British Army
- Service years: 1946–48
- Rank: Sergeant
- Unit: Royal Army Service Corps

Sir William Stanley Baker (28 February 1928 – 28 June 1976) was a Welsh actor and film producer. Known for his rugged appearance and intense, grounded screen persona, he was one of the top British male film stars of the late 1950s, and later a producer.

Born into a coal mining family in Glamorgan, Baker began his acting career in the West End. Following national service in the Royal Army Service Corps after the Second World War, he befriended actor Richard Burton and began appearing in film and television roles. He played the lead role in Hell Drivers and supporting role in The Guns of Navarone. He was producer and lead actor in the 1964 film Zulu, in which he portrayed John Chard.

Baker's performance in the 1959 film Yesterday's Enemy was nominated for the BAFTA Award for Best British Actor, and he was nominated for a Primetime Emmy Award for his turn in the BBC serial How Green Was My Valley. He was awarded a knighthood in 1976, although he died before the investiture ceremony: a heavy smoker, he developed lung cancer and died in 1976.

== Early life ==
Baker was born in Ferndale, Glamorgan, Wales, the youngest of three children. His father was a coal miner who lost a leg in a pit accident but continued working as a lift operator at the mine until his death. Baker grew up a self-proclaimed "wild kid", interested in only "football and boxing". He thought he would most likely be a miner or maybe a boxer.

His artistic ability was spotted at an early age by a local teacher, Glynne Morse, who encouraged Baker to act. When he was 14 he was performing in a school play when seen by a casting director from Ealing Studios, who recommended him for a role in Undercover (1943), a war film about the Yugoslav guerrillas in Serbia. He was paid £20 a week, caught the acting bug, and pursued a professional acting career. Six months later Baker appeared with Emlyn Williams in a play in the West End called The Druid's Rest, appearing alongside Richard Burton.

Baker worked for a time as an apprentice electrician, then through Morse's influence, he managed to secure a position with the Birmingham Repertory Theatre in 1944. He was there for three years when he had to do his national service. He served in the Royal Army Service Corps from 1946 until 1948, attaining the rank of sergeant. Following his demobilisation Baker returned to London determined to resume his acting career. He was recommended by Richard Burton for casting in a small role in Terence Rattigan's West End play, Adventure Story (1949).

== Career ==
=== Early career ===
Baker began appearing in films and on television, as well as performing on stage for the Middlesex Repertory Company. He had small roles in All Over the Town (1949), Obsession (1949), Your Witness (1950), Lilli Marlene (1950), Something in the City (1950), The Rossiter Case (1951), Cloudburst (1951), Home to Danger (1951) and Whispering Smith Hits London (1952). According to Filmink "he was very castable with a great scowly face that was useful for playing sulky soldiers and lurking thugs."

His TV roles included The Tragedy of Pompey the Great (1950) and Rush Job (1951). Baker attracted attention when cast as the bosun's mate in the Hollywood-financed Captain Horatio Hornblower (1951). It was the ninth most popular film at the British box office that year.

In 1951 he toured England in a play by Christopher Fry, A Sleep of Prisoners which was part of the Festival of Britain. It was about four POWs spending a night in a bombed out church and was staged in actual churches; the rest of the cast included Denholm Elliott, Hugh Pryse and Leonard White. The project was transferred in its entirety to New York for a limited run, and also toured throughout the US.

While in New York, Baker read the novel The Cruel Sea by Nicholas Monsarrat. Although the role of the cowardly officer Bennett was an Australian in the book, the Englishman Donald Sinden was originally screen-tested for the part and the Welsh Baker was screen-tested for the part of Lockhart. Subsequently, at Jack Hawkins' suggestion and after further screen-tests, the roles were swapped. The Cruel Sea was the most successful film at the British box office in 1953 and Baker was now established in films.

On television, he appeared in "A Cradle in Willow" and played Petruchio in a version of Taming of the Shrew (1952). He had a small role in a British-US co-production for Warwick Films, The Red Beret (1953), with Alan Ladd, another big hit in Britain. Warwick liked his work so much they promptly reteamed him with Ladd in Hell Below Zero (1954), with Baker billed fourth as the main villain.

Baker got another break when George Sanders fell ill and was unable to play Sir Mordred in the expensive epic Knights of the Round Table (1953), made by MGM in Britain. Baker stepped in and got excellent reviews; the movie was very popular.

He had his biggest role in a purely British film with The Good Die Young (1954), directed by Lewis Gilbert, playing a boxer who commits a robbery. Baker was cast in Twist of Fate (1954) opposite Ginger Rogers, replacing Walter Rilla, who quit the production ten days into filming. Hollywood came calling again and offered him the choice support role of Achilles in Helen of Troy (1955), shot in Italy for Robert Wise.

Most of Baker's film roles until this stage had been playing villains. His career received another boost when Laurence Olivier selected him to play Henry Tudor in Richard III (1955).

On TV he was in The Creature (1955) by Nigel Kneale, later filmed (without Baker) as The Abominable Snowman (1957). He was in another epic, playing Attalus in Alexander the Great (1956), which starred Burton in the title role and was shot in Spain for Robert Rossen. He also portrayed Rochester in a British TV adaptation of Jane Eyre (1956).

Baker's first leading role in a feature film came with Child in the House (1956), written and directed by Cy Endfield. He had a support role as a psychotic corporal in A Hill in Korea (1956), a Korean War film that also featured early performances from Michael Caine, Stephen Boyd and Robert Shaw. He was the villain in a racing car drama, Checkpoint (1956), opposite Anthony Steel. It was made by the team of Betty E. Box and Ralph Thomas for the Rank Organisation.

=== Lead actor ===
Baker finally broke away from supporting parts when cast as the lead in Hell Drivers (1957), a truck driving drama directed by Endfield. Before it was released he played another villain role for Box and Thomas, Campbell's Kingdom (1957), opposite Dirk Bogarde, shot in Italy (substituting for Canada). Following this he was meant to make Tread Softly Stranger with Diana Dors but George Baker was cast instead. Hell Drivers was a minor hit, and at the end of the year exhibitors voted Baker the seventh most popular British star at the British box office for 1957 (after Bogarde, Kenneth More, Peter Finch, John Gregson, Norman Wisdom and John Mills, and before Ian Carmichael, Jack Hawkins and Belinda Lee). The success of Hell Drivers saw Baker play a series of tough anti-heroes. In the words of David Thomson:

Until the early 1960s, Baker was the only male lead in the British cinema who managed to suggest contempt, aggression and the working class. He is the first hint of proletarian male vigour against the grain of Leslie Howard, James Mason, Stewart Granger, John Mills, Dirk Bogarde and the theatrical knights. Which is not to disparage these players, but to say that Baker was a welcome novelty, that he is one of Britain's most important screen actors, and that he has not yet been equalled – not even by Michael Caine.

Filmink argued the films "established Baker as Britain’s leading anti-hero, and first non-comic working class movie star. He would typically play a tough guy, a crook or a cop, who was involved in a heist, either committing it or tracking down the culprits, rather like Humphrey Bogart or John Garfield. The films would be medium budget, in black and white, heavily male focused, gritty and generally downbeat."

Baker was a detective in Violent Playground (1958), a drama about juvenile delinquency from the director-producer team Basil Dearden and Michael Relph. He was reunited with Endfield for Sea Fury (1958), an action drama, playing a tugboat captain. He was voted the tenth biggest British star in Britain at the end of the year.

He made the Hollywood-financed The Angry Hills (1959) in Greece with Robert Aldrich opposite Robert Mitchum. Baker said Aldrich offered to engage him in a 28-part series about an Englishman in New York, but he had turned it down to stay in Britain.

Baker had the lead in Yesterday's Enemy (1959), a World War II drama set in Burma for Hammer Films, directed by Val Guest. He was a detective in Blind Date (1959) for director Joseph Losey, one of Baker's favourite roles. He made a fourth film with Endfield, Jet Storm (1959) playing an airline captain. None of these films were particularly huge at the box office but at the end of the year Baker was voted the fourth most popular British star. Hell Is a City (1960) had him as another hardbitten detective, a second collaboration with Val Guest. He was reunited with Losey for The Criminal (1960), playing an ex-con, and Baker's favourite role.

He played the relatively small role of "Butcher Brown", a war-weary commando, in the Hollywood blockbuster war epic The Guns of Navarone (1961) shot in Greece. It was a massive hit at the box office.

A third collaboration with Losey was Eva (1962), a French-Italian film where Baker acted opposite Jeanne Moreau. Aldrich asked him to play another villain role, in the Biblical epic Sodom and Gomorrah (1962). There was some talk he would play Rufio in Cleopatra (1963) but it did not eventuate. He was a tough army officer committing a robbery in A Prize of Arms (1962) but the film failed at the box office and it seemed the market for the tough action films in which Baker had specialised might be drying up. He appeared opposite Jean Seberg in In the French Style (1962), a French-American romance produced by Irwin Shaw. He was in The Man Who Finally Died (1963) for British TV.

Baker's widow later claimed that he was originally offered the role of James Bond, but turned it down not wanting to commit to a long-term contract. She also says he was going to star in This Sporting Life but had to drop out when Guns of Navarone went over schedule. She says Baker never regretted losing the part of Bond to Sean Connery but regretted not making This Sporting Life.

=== Production ===
Baker formed his own company, 'Diamond Films' with Cy Endfield. They developed a script about the Battle of Rorke's Drift written by Endfield and John Prebble. While making Sodom and Gomorrah Baker struck up a relationship with that film's producer, Joseph E. Levine which enabled him to raise the $3 million budget for Zulu (1964), directed by Endfield, shot partly on location in South Africa. Zulu was a big hit at the box office and made a star of Michael Caine. Baker played the lead part of Lieutenant John Chard VC in what remains his best-remembered role. He later owned Chard's Victoria Cross and Zulu War Medal from 1972 until his death in 1976. (Chard died at age 49 in 1897, only a year older than Baker at his death; both died of cancer).

Baker made two more films in South Africa: Dingaka (1965), on which he worked as an actor only but which was distributed by Levine, and Sands of the Kalahari (1965), which he starred in and produced, directed by Endfield and financed by Levine. Both were box-office failures commercially and Baker made no further films with Endfield. Baker had plans to film Wilbur Smith's debut novel When the Lion Feeds and The Coral Strand by John Masters. but neither project was realised.

He made a TV movie for the United Nations entitled Who Has Seen the Wind? (1965), and appeared in two episodes of Bob Hope Presents the Chrysler Theatre: After the Lion, Jackals (1966) and Code Name: Heraclitus (1967). In 1966 he made a deal with Universal to produce and star in a film. He made a final film with Losey, Accident (1967), cast against type as an academic.

Baker formed the production company Oakhurst Productions with Michael Deeley. Its first cinema film was Robbery (1967), a heist film with Baker in the lead role. It was a solid success in Britain and launched the Hollywood career of director Peter Yates. Baker announced he would make another film for Levine, A Nice Girl Like Me acting opposite Hayley Mills who would play a girl who repeatedly gets pregnant. The film would be made by Levine, but not with Baker or Mills. He was also going to film the John Roeburt novel The Climate of Hell with James Goldstone. and the Norman Lewis novel Everyman's Brother. He appeared in The Girl with the Pistol (1968), an Italian comedy, then worked as a producer only on two films for Oakhurst: Sleep Is Lovely (1968), which was never released, and The Italian Job (1969) a heist comedy with Michael Caine, a big hit. He was also part of the consortium which set up Harlech Television. At the end of 1968 exhibitors voted him the ninth biggest star in Britain, after John Wayne, Julie Christie, Steve McQueen, Tommy Steele, Paul Newman, Sean Connery, Clint Eastwood and Julie Andrews.

Baker produced and starred in Where's Jack? (1969) for Oakhurst opposite Tommy Steele for director James Clavell. It was a box office failure. As an actor only, he appeared in The Games (1970) for 20th Century Fox. He appeared in two films for producer Dimitri de Grunwald: The Last Grenade (1970), playing a mercenary, and Perfect Friday (1970), a heist movie directed by Peter Hall which Baker helped produce.

=== Later career ===
In the 1970s, Baker announced a number of projects as producer, including an adaptation of George MacDonald Fraser's novel Flashman, to be directed by Richard Lester, and Summer Fires with Peter Hall. "I don't make films to see myself perform, I do it to act", said Baker. "I've enjoyed everything I've worked on, including the bad pictures... I enjoy being a working actor. I've been accused by journalists of lack of discretion, lack of taste. Well I'd rather have that lack than the lack of having made them... Producing is total involvement and compatible with acting, while I don't think directing is. Producing gives you a continuity of effort that helps with acting."

He also expanded his business interests. He was one of the founder members of Harlech Television, and was a director of it until his death.

With Michael Deeley and Barry Spikings, he formed 'Great Western Enterprises', which was involved in a number of projects in the entertainment field, notably music concerts, and in the late 1960s it bought Alembic House (now called Peninsula Heights) on the Albert Embankment, where Baker occupied the penthouse apartment for a number of years. Baker, Deeley, and Spikings were also part of a consortium that bought British Lion Films and Shepperton Studios, selling Alembic House to finance it. Baker said in 1972 that:

I love business for the activity it creates, the total commitment. The acting bit is great for the ego, (but) all the real excitement is in business... I'm still surprised how good I am at business.

However, Baker was the victim of bad timing. The British film industry went into serious decline at the end of the 1960s, and a number of Oakhurst films were unsuccessful at the box office. Plans to make a costume drama called Sunblack, directed by Gordon Flemyng, did not come to fruition. His commercial foray into pop music festivals was financially disastrous, with the Great Western Bardney Pop Festival in Lincoln ending up losing £200,000. The British stock market crashed at the end of 1973, throwing the over-leveraged British Lion into turmoil.

Baker was forced to keep acting to pay the bills, often accepting roles in poor films which adversely affected his status as a star. His son Glyn later said that:

"My dad had to accept any and everything to keep the companies afloat. Doing staggeringly-bad stuff like Popsy Pop, which was an Italian–Venezuelan co-production and A Lizard in a Woman's Skin [both 1971] – a movie which makes absolutely no sense whatsoever. At the slowest period, Stanley still had a payroll of at least 100 in his employ. So it was, 'Here we go – take the money, make this trash, hopefully, no one will ever see it.' Famous last words."'

According to Michael Deeley, the financiers of British Lion Films were reluctant for Baker to be involved in the management of the company because they felt his focus was more on his acting career.

The Butterfly Affair (1970) was with Claudia Cardinale; A Lizard in a Woman's Skin (1971) was an Italian giallo movie; Innocent Bystanders (1972) was directed by Peter Collinson who had done The Italian Job.

Towards the end of his life Baker pulled back on his business activities and worked mostly as an actor, taking roles in television including two of the BBC's Play of the Month series: The Changeling and Robinson Crusoe (both 1974), plus Who Killed Lamb? (1974) and Graceless Go I (1974).

He made a series of films in Spain: Zorro (1975), starring Alain Delon, where Baker played the main villain; Bride to Be (1975), with Sarah Miles.

Baker's final British performance was in a BBC Wales adaptation of How Green Was My Valley (1975), broadcast shortly before he was diagnosed with cancer. Shortly before his death he was planning on producing a prequel to Zulu, Zulu Dawn. His last role was in an Italian TV miniseries, Orzowei, il figlio della savana (1976), based on the novel Orzowei.

Filmink argued "Baker had so much talent and drive that if he had lived longer, we believe that his career would have re-flourished. It’s not hard to envision him picking up easy money in ‘80s Hollywood with its love for British villains (Steve Berkoff, Alan Rickman) and his love for producing was bound to come up with some first rate projects eventually."

== Personal life ==
In 1950, Baker married the actress Ellen Martin, who had been introduced to him by Burton. Their marriage lasted until his death and they had four children, Martin and Sally (twins), Glyn and Adam. Glyn appeared in The Wild Geese (1978), opposite Richard Burton, and in Return of the Jedi (1983), as Lieutenant Endicott, the imperial officer who says, "Inform the commander that Lord Vader's shuttle has arrived." He was a friend and drinking companion of Richard Burton.

Baker was a socialist and an acquaintance of Prime Minister Harold Wilson, and recorded television broadcasts in support of the Labour Party. Many of his friends believed Baker had damaged his acting career through his attempts to transform himself into a businessman.

Baker moved to Spain to live in the early 1970s.

In an interview shortly before his death he admitted to being a compulsive gambler all his life, although he claimed he always had enough money to look after his family.

On 27 May 1976, a month before his death, it was announced that he had been awarded a knighthood in the 1976 Prime Minister's Resignation Honours, although he did not live to be invested in person at Buckingham Palace.

== Death and legacy ==
Baker was a heavy cigarette and cigar smoker, and was diagnosed with lung cancer on 13 February 1976. He underwent surgery later that month. However, the cancer had spread to his bones and he died from pneumonia on 28 June 1976 in Málaga, Spain, aged 48.

His body was cremated at Putney Vale Crematorium, his ashes being scattered on a hillside overlooking his childhood home in accordance to his wishes. He told his wife shortly before he died:

I have no regrets. I've had a fantastic life; no one has had a more fantastic life than I have. From the beginning I have been surrounded by love. I'm the son of a Welsh miner and I was born into love, married into love and spent my life in love.

Ferndale RFC, a rugby club in the Rhondda Valleys, South Wales, established a tribute to Baker in the form of their "Sir Stanley Baker Lounge". Officially opened by his widow, Ellen, Lady Baker, on Friday 24 November 2006, the day's events featured a presentation to Stanley Baker's sons and family members.

== Filmography ==
=== Film ===
Year	Title	Role	Director	Notes
1943	Undercover	Petar	Sergei Nolbandov	Film debut. U.S. title Underground Guerrillas.
1947	Just William's Luck	Fur thief	Val Guest	Uncredited
1949	Obsession	Policeman	Edward Dmytryk	Uncredited
1949	All Over the Town	Barnes	Derek Twist	Uncredited
1949	Obsession	Policeman	Edward Dmytryk	Uncredited
1950	Your Witness	Police Sgt. Bannoch	Robert Montgomery	U.S. title Eye Witness
1950	Lilli Marlene	Evans	Arthur Crabtree	
1950	Something in the City	Policeman	Maclean Rogers	Uncredited
1951	The Rossiter Case	Joe	Francis Searle	
1951	Captain Horatio Hornblower	Mr. Harrison	Raoul Walsh	First Hollywood movie.
1951	Cloudburst	Milkman	Francis Searle	
1951	Home to Danger	Willie Dougan	Terence Fisher	
1952	Whispering Smith Hits London	Reporter No. 1	Francis Searle	U.S. title Whispering Smith vs. Scotland Yard
1953	The Cruel Sea	Bennett	Charles Frend	
1953	The Red Beret	Breton	Terence Young	a.k.a. The Red Devils; a.k.a. The Big Jump; U.S. title Paratrooper
1953	Knights of the Round Table	Modred	Richard Thorpe	
1953	The Tell-Tale Heart	Narrator	J.B.Williams	Short film
1953	The Wedding of Lilli Marlene	Audience member	Arthur Crabtree	Uncredited
1954	Hell Below Zero	Erik Bland	Mark Robson	
1954	The Good Die Young	Mike Morgan	Lewis Gilbert	
1954	Twist of Fate	Louis Galt	David Miller	a.k.a. Beautiful Stranger
1955	Richard III	Henry, Earl of Richmond	Laurence Olivier	
1956	Helen of Troy	Achilles	Robert Wise	
1956	Alexander the Great	Attalus	Robert Rossen	
1956	Child in the House	Stephen Lorimer	Cy Endfield	
1956	A Hill in Korea	Cpl. Ryker	Julian Amyes	U.S. title Hell in Korea
1956	Checkpoint	O'Donovan	Ralph Thomas	
1957	Hell Drivers	Tom Yately	Cy Endfield	
1957	Campbell's Kingdom	Owen Morgan	Ralph Thomas	
1958	Violent Playground	Det. Sgt. Jack Truman	Basil Dearden	
1958	Sea Fury	Abel Hewson	Cy Endfield	
1959	The Angry Hills	Conrad Heisler	Robert Aldrich	
1959	Yesterday's Enemy	Captain Alan Langford	Val Guest	
1959	Blind Date	Insp. Morgan	Joseph Losey	
1959	Jet Storm	Capt. Bardow	Cy Endfield	
1960	Hell Is a City	Inspector Harry Martineau	Val Guest	
1960	The Criminal	Johnny Bannion	Joseph Losey	
1961	The Guns of Navarone	Pte. Butcher Brown	J. Lee Thompson	
1962	Eva	Tyvian Jones	Joseph Losey	
1962	Sodom and Gomorrah	Astaroth	Robert Aldrich	
1962	A Prize of Arms	Turpin	Cliff Owen	
1963	In the French Style	Walter Beddoes	Robert Parrish	
1963	The Man Who Finally Died	Joe Newman	Quentin Lawrence	
1964	Zulu	Lt. John Chard	Cy Endfield	Also producer
1964	Dingaka	Tom Davis	Jamie Uys	
1965	One of Them Is Named Brett	Narrator	Roger Graef	
1965	Sands of the Kalahari	Mike Bain	Cy Endfield	Also producer
1967	Accident	Charley	Joseph Losey	
1967	Robbery	Paul Clifton	Peter Yates	Also producer
1968	The Girl with the Pistol	Dr. Tom Osborne	Mario Monicelli	
1968	Sleep Is Lovely		David Hart	Producer only (uncredited)
1969	Where's Jack?	Jonathan Wild	James Clavell	Also producer
1969	The Italian Job		Peter Collinson	Producer only (uncredited)
1970	The Last Grenade	Maj. Harry Grigsby	Gordon Flemyng	
1970	The Games	Bill Oliver	Michael Winner	
1970	Perfect Friday	Mr. Graham	Peter Hall	Also producer
1970	Colosseum and Juicy Lucy		Tony Palmer	Producer only
1971	A Lizard in a Woman's Skin	Inspector Corvin	Lucio Fulci	
1971	The Butterfly Affair	Inspector Silva	Jean Herman	
1972	Innocent Bystanders	John Craig	Peter Collinson	
1975	Zorro	Col. Huerta	Duccio Tessari	
1975	Bride to Be	Pedro de Vargas	Rafael Moreno Alba	

=== Television ===
Year	Title	Role	Notes
1950-1958	BBC Sunday Night Theatre	Various	7 episodes, including The Taming of the Shrew
1951	Rush Job	Sid Bonner	Television film
1955	Sunday Night Theatre	Tom Friend	Episode: "The Creature"
1956	Jane Eyre	Mr. Rochester	5 episodes
1958	Armchair Theatre	Luce Dorell	Episode: "The Criminals"
1960	BBC Sunday-Night Play	Big Tom	Episode: "The Squeeze"
1964	Drama '64	Chief Insp. Tom Dyke	Episode: "A Fear of Strangers"
1965	Who Has Seen the Wind?	Janos	Television film
1966	ITV Play of the Week	John Ellis	Episode: "The Tormentors"
1966-1967	Bob Hope Presents the Chrysler Theatre	C.C. Conover/Frank G. Wheatley	Episodes: After the Lion, Jackals and Code Name: Heraclitus
1970	ITV Sunday Night Theatre	Sam Tennant	Episode: "Fade Out"
1974	Who Killed Lamb?	Detective Inspector Jamieson	Television film
1974	Late Night Drama	Roger	Episode: "Graceless Go I"
1974	Play of the Month	De Flores/Robinson Crusoe	Episodes: The Changeling and Robinson Crusoe
1975-1976	How Green Was My Valley	Gwilym Morgan	Miniseries
1976	Orzowei, il figlio della savana	Paul	6 episodes

== Select theatre credits ==
- The Druid's Rest by Emlyn Williams (1943) – with Richard Burton
- 1944–46 – various with Birmingham Repertory Theatre
- Adventure Story by Terence Rattigan (1949) – with Paul Scofield
- Treasure Island (1949) – with Middlesex Repertory Company
- Wuthering Heights (1949) – with Middlesex Repertory Company

== Box office rankings ==
Baker featured several times in the annual poll of British exhibitors for Motion Picture Annual listing the most popular stars at the local box office:

- 1957 – 7th most popular British star
- 1958 – 10th most popular British star
- 1959 – 4th most popular British star
- 1960 – 8th most popular star in Britain regardless of nationality
- 1968 – 9th most popular star in Britain regardless of nationality

== Awards and nominations ==
- 1959 BAFTA – Nomination for Best British Actor for Yesterday's Enemy

== Bibliography ==
- Walker, Alexander (1985). National Heroes: British Cinema in the Seventies and Eighties. Harrap.
