= Venezuela during World War II =

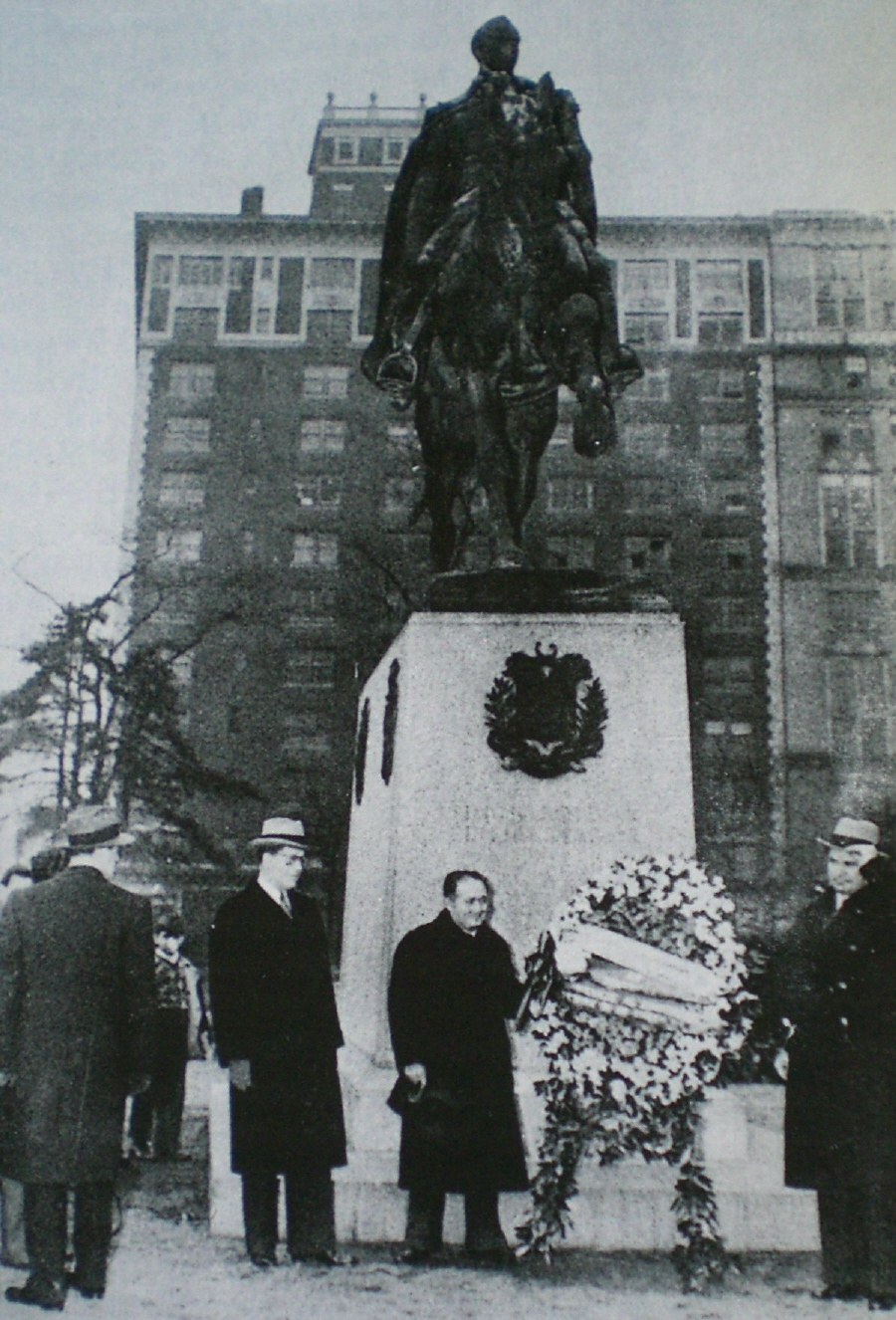
- A floral offering in front of a Simón Bolívar statue in New York City, during the official visit of Venezuela's President Isaías Medina Angarita (right) to the United States in 1944.
- Location: Venezuela
- Date: 1939–1945
- Events: Koenigstein and Caribia –March 1939; Severing of relations –December 31, 1941; The Attack on Aruba –February 16, 1942; Declaration of war –February 15, 1945

The history of Venezuela during World War II is marked by dramatic change to the country's economy, military, and society. At the beginning of World War II in 1939, Venezuela was the world's leading oil exporter, and subsequently one of the main beneficiaries of the American Lend-Lease programs. Economic assistance from the United States, as well a booming oil industry, led Venezuela to become one of the few Latin American countries that was able to finance its own modernization in the post-war era. Furthermore, through skillful diplomacy, Venezuela was able to gain territory, increase its share in oil profits, and also reduce its reliance on foreign oil companies.

Although Venezuela was officially neutral for most of the war, it covertly supported the Allies, and eventually declared war on the Axis powers in February 1945, a few months before the end of the conflict.

== History ==
=== The oil industry ===
According to Thomas M. Leonard, Venezuela's oil garnered "intense interest" from the Allies and the Axis, both before and during World War II. (A mechanized global war boosted demand for fuel for ships, submarines, aviation and tanks, and almost half of the world's petroleum exports in 1940 originated in Venezuelan fields.) Thus Venezuela's main strategic goal from 1939 to 1945 was to protect its oil from seizure by a belligerent. Closely related to this goal was the need to market oil, which had become the mainstay of the Venezuelan economy. Leonard says that the war could, ideally, have resulted in an "economic boom" if Venezuela could maintain a policy of strict neutrality and could sell oil to both sides. However, neither the Axis nor the Allies were likely to tolerate such a situation, and from 1939, Britain's blockade of continental Europe made selling to the Axis powers there difficult. In the end, Venezuela sided with the Allies.

Even though Venezuela was decidedly pro-Allied, the government attempted to increase its hold on the oil market, which was dominated by American-owned petroleum firms. One option would have been to nationalize the oil industry (as Mexico had done in 1938). However, the Venezuelans never seriously considered this option, because nationalizing the oil industry meant seizing U.S.-owned oil, which would have likely resulted in an American military intervention. Although Mexico's nationalization of its oil industry did not result in an American military intervention there, just the possibility of one was enough to keep the Venezuelan government content with seeking a mere increase in its share of profits, rather than taking all of it.

Subsequently, the United States, eager to maintain its access to oil, agreed to increase oil revenues for Venezuela, splitting profits fifty-fifty between the Venezuelan government and the oil companies (such as Standard Oil and the British-owned Shell Oil). As result, in 1944 Venezuela's oil income was 66% higher than it was in 1941, and by 1947 total income had increased by 358%. This "largesse", as Leonard calls it, allowed Venezuela to become one of the few Latin American countries able to finance its own modernization in the postwar era — unlike many of the other states in the region, which relied on Washington's economic assistance.

=== Axis influence ===
Nazi efforts to increase German influence in Venezuela (and thus to access Venezuelan oil) dated back to 1933, when prominent German leaders formed the Venezuelan Regional Group of the Nazi Party, or Grupo Regional de Venezuela del Partido Nazi. Subsequently the Germans began "courting" the Venezuelan military through its military mission. On the "cultural front," according to Leonard, General Wilhelm von Faupel, the head of the Ibero-American Institute, attempted to gain influence by sending his wife, Edith, to Venezuela to "extol the virtues of fascism". Germany also actively countered American economic influence by expanding German holdings in mining, agriculture, and railroading.

During the war, nearly 4,000 German immigrants resided in Venezuela. Consequently, certain Allied leaders feared the development of a "fifth column" to commit sabotage and other acts against the Venezuelan government or oil-related infrastructure. The nearby British, French, and Dutch colonies also presented security concerns for the Allies: any of these areas falling under Axis control would certainly become bases for the interdiction of the Caribbean sea-lanes, which carried Venezuela's crude oil for refining in Aruba, and thence to market. They could also be used as staging areas for the invasion of neighboring countries, or for commando operations to interrupt oil production.

In 1938, the Venezuelan Navy purchased two Azio-class minesweepers from Fascist Italy. In September 1939, President Eleazar López Contreras declared Venezuela's neutrality: Venezuela continued to trade with Japan and Italy for another year. Trade with Imperial Japan reached an all-time high in 1939, but trade with Germany ceased due to the British blockade. Under these circumstances some observers concluded that Venezuela would join the Axis if it were forced to take sides. However, the fear of Venezuela aligning itself with Germany, or with any of the other Axis powers, was mostly unwarranted, because the sentiment of the Venezuelan population was "bitterly anti-German."

Nazi Germany invaded the Netherlands on 10 May 1940; within hours French and British troops occupied the Dutch islands of Curaçao and Aruba off the Venezuelan coast. The presence of powers other than the Netherlands alarmed the Venezuelan government, given the proximity of these islands at the entrance to the Gulf of Venezuela and the fact they had historically served as bases to launch incursions against Venezuelan territory.

The British and French navies harassed German and Italian commercial ships' activities in the Caribbean. The Allied blockade prevented Axis-flagged ships from returning to their countries of origin. In 1940, six Italian-flagged ships and one German-flagged ship asked the Venezuelan government for refuge given its status as a neutral country. Caracas agreed, and the seven vessels stayed in the bay of Puerto Cabello. Among the vessels were: the Italian-flagged merchant ships Baccicin Padre, Teresa Odero, Jole Faccio and Trottiera and the German Sesostris. On the night of March 31, 1940, the crews of the refugee ships set fire to their own ships following orders from the naval high command of the Rome-Berlin Axis.

In 1941, US troops occupied Aruba, Bonaire and Curaçao and built military airports. The main purpose of this deployment was to repel expected future attacks by Axis submarines and by potential long-distance Nazi bombers. The United States also had concerns over the potential threat of a German invasion of the continental US launched with the aid of German settlers in South America.

Operation Bolívar was the codename for the German espionage in Latin America during World War II. Under the operational control of Section D (4) of the Foreign Security Service (Ausland-SD), it focussed on the collection and transmission of clandestine information from Latin America to Europe. Overall, the Germans successfully established a secret radio-communications network from their control station in Argentina, as well as a courier system involving the use of Spanish merchant vessels for the shipment of paper-form intelligence.

=== Koenigstein and Caribia ===
The SS Koenigstein and the SS Caribia were a pair of German steamboats that were used to carry about 300 Jewish refugees from Europe to Venezuela between February and March 1939. The Koenigstein, with eighty-six Jews on board, left Germany in January 1939 for the British colony of Trinidad, but when it arrived, the British refused to accept the passengers because of a recent prohibition on the admission of refugees. As result, the Koenigstein sailed to Honduras, but again the passengers were denied entry. With nowhere else to go, the Koenigstein then sailed for Venezuela, and arrived on February 17, 1939. The SS Caribia, carrying 165 Jews, went through a very similar ordeal. After sailing to British Guiana, Georgetown authorities refused to allow the passengers to land, and so the Caribia sailed to Venezuela, arriving on March 16, 1939.

At first, the Venezuelan government gave the refugees special permission to stay in the country temporarily, until new homes could be found for them in other Latin American countries, but they were banned from finding employment in any industry other than agriculture. Furthermore, the Venezuelan government made it clear that it would not accept any more refugees, unless they came through the proper channels. Later, President López Contreras gave the refugees permission to remain in the country permanently, as a result of which, the passengers of the Koenigstein and the Caribia became some of the founding members of Venezuela's Jewish community, as most Jewish emigration to Venezuela would occur after the war, in the 1950s and 1960s.

=== The Venezuelan military ===
When World War II began, the Venezuelan military was badly in need of modernization, and the United States was eager to help in return for Venezuela's support in the war. However, the United States was concerned about a possible enemy attack on Venezuela, in order to disrupt oil production, if it did openly join the Allied cause and declare war. As result, the Venezuelan government broke relations with the Axis powers on December 31, 1941, but it did not declare war until February 15, 1945, when the threat of an attack against the oil was gone. Therefore, the Venezuelan military never met the enemy on the battlefield, although under the Operation Neuland a few Venezuelan merchant ships were sunk; the first of which called "Monagas" occurred during the German attack on Aruba in February 1942.

Because Venezuela was officially neutral for most of the war, the task of guarding the Venezuelan coast for enemy activity and escorting Venezuelan ships was left to the Americans. Accordingly, after the attack on Aruba, the United States Navy established the Fourth Fleet, which was responsible for countering enemy naval operations in the Caribbean and in the South Atlantic. The United States Army also sent aircraft and personnel to help protect the oil refineries and bolster the Venezuelan Air Force. To support the mission, Venezuela granted American ships and planes access to the country's ports and airstrips.

== Gallery ==
President Medina's visit to the U.S. in 1944.

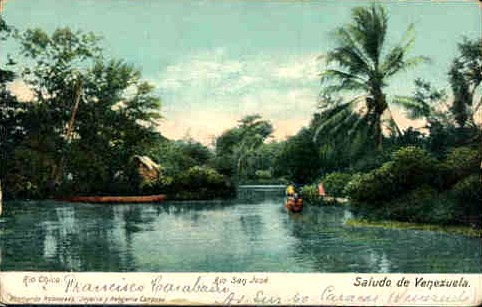
Río Chico in Miranda, Venezuela in 1940.

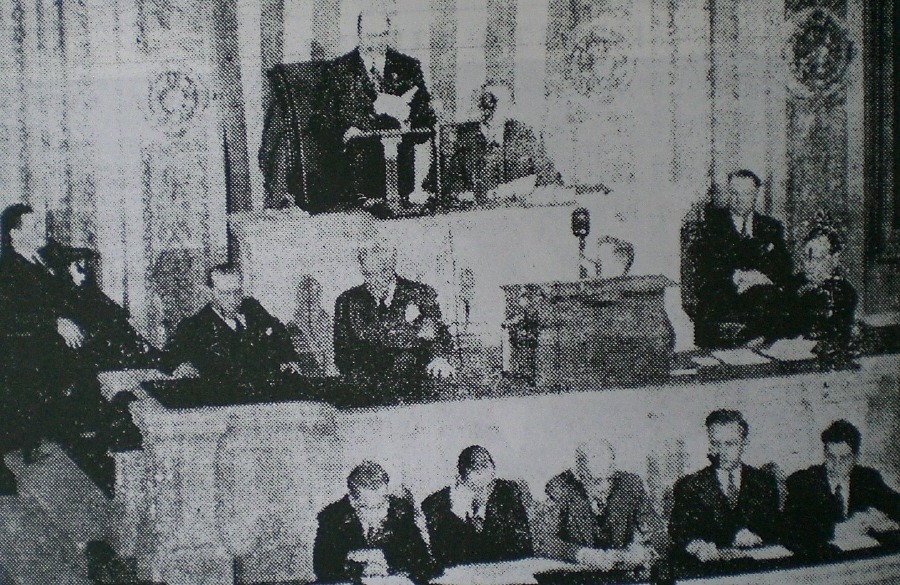
President Isaías Medina Angarita speaking to the United States Congress in 1944.

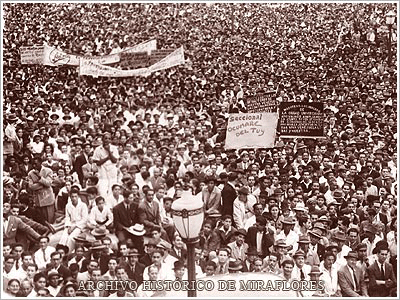
Protesters in Caracas in 1945.

== See also ==
- Operation Bolívar
- American Theater (1939–1945)
- History of Venezuela
