= Robbery (1967 film) =

1967 British film by Peter Yates

- Theatrical release poster
- Directed by: Peter Yates
- Written by: Edward Boyd; Peter Yates; George Markstein
- Based on: The Robber's Tale by Peta Fordham
- Produced by: Stanley Baker; Michael Deeley
- Starring: Stanley Baker; Joanna Pettet; James Booth
- Cinematography: Douglas Slocombe
- Edited by: Reginald Beck
- Music by: Johnny Keating
- Production company: Oakhurst Productions
- Distributed by: Paramount British Pictures (UK); Embassy Pictures (USA)
- Release dates: 21 September 1967 (London-premiere); 22 September 1967 (United Kingdom); 27 September 1967 (New York City)
- Running time: 114 minutes
- Country: United Kingdom
- Language: English
- Budget: £395,338

Robbery is a 1967 British crime film directed by Peter Yates and starring Stanley Baker, Joanna Pettet and James Booth. The story is a heavily fictionalised version of the 1963 Great Train Robbery. The film was produced by Stanley Baker and Michael Deeley, for Baker's company Oakhurst Productions.

== Plot ==
A criminal gang uses a gas canister to knock out the occupant of a car and then bundles him into a stolen ambulance. There, the gang cuts free a briefcase full of jewellery. Shortly afterward, while the criminals change vehicles, they are spotted by the police. A high-speed chase develops, and the criminals get away.

Using the money from this job, crime boss Paul Clifton builds up a team to hit a Royal Mail train coming south from Glasgow. A meticulous plan is put in place, but there are obstacles: Jack, the driver of the getaway car in the jewellery theft, is identified in an identity parade and arrested but refuses to name accomplices to police; gang member Robinson must be broken out of prison; and Inspector George Langdon is hot on the trail of the jewel robbers and finds out through informers about plans for an even bigger heist.

The gang gathers to do the job and change the signals to stop the train and escape with the cash. In the morning, Langdon and the police investigate the crime scene and explore possible local hideouts, including a disused airbase in which the robbers are hiding in the basement, but are not found.

The cash is divided up and the getaway vehicles hidden at a scrapyard. The members wait in turn to take their share to Switzerland. However, the paid-off scrapyard man is arrested at an airport, is found with banknotes from the raid, and confesses. Police then arrest some of the gang as they retrieve cars at the scrapyard. That leads the police back to the airfield, where they arrest further gang members.

Clifton evades capture, places his cut of the money on a private plane, and is last seen disembarking at New York with a different identity.

== Cast ==
- Stanley Baker as Paul Clifton
- Joanna Pettet as Kate Clifton
- James Booth as Inspector George Langdon
- Frank Finlay as Robinson (one of the gang)
- Barry Foster as Frank (one of the gang)
- William Marlowe as Dave Aitken (one of the gang)
- Clinton Greyn as Jack (one of the gang, a getaway driver)
- George Sewell as Ben (one of the gang)
- Glynn Edwards as squad chief
- Michael McStay as Don (one of the gang)
- Martin Wyldeck as chief constable
- Rachel Herbert as schoolteacher
- Patrick Jordan as Freddy
- Barry Stanton as garage owner
- Kenneth Farrington as seventh robber
- Ivor Dean as postal worker (uncredited)
- Bill Wallis as postal worker (uncredited)
- Robert Powell as train driver's assistant (uncredited)
- Mike Pratt as informant at railway station (uncredited)
- John Savident as police constable with the alsatian dog (uncredited)
- Frank Williams as prison contact (uncredited)

== Production ==
Michael Deeley bought the rights to Peta Fordham's book based on the Great Train Robbery of 1963. He and director Peter Yates offered the project to Woodfall Film Productions, where Deeley worked, but the company did not want to make it. Deeley and Yates then approached Stanley Baker to star in the film. Baker had a good relationship with Joseph E. Levine, whose Embassy Pictures agreed to fund the movie. Finance also came from the NFFC.

To avoid legal problems, it was decided to write a script in which the details in the 25-minute robbery sequence were taken entirely from court evidence, but the remainder of the film would be fictitious speculation. "We had to make sure there was no risk of accidental identification with anyone", said Baker. "The characters involved in the film are in no way based on the characters who took part in the great train robbery".

Stanley Baker hired Edward Boyd to write the script after being impressed by a radio play of Boyd's. Baker attributed the fact they could make the film at all to the co operation of John Treveleyan, the censor.

Vanessa Redgrave was approached to play Kate Clifton but turned down the role. Joseph Levine asked for the story to be changed to include an American mastermind behind the robbery to ensure that the movie would appeal to US audiences. Three days of scenes were shot featuring Jason Robards in his role on Long Island and using Levine's own yacht. However, after this was done it was decided not to use the footage.

George Raft was to have played a role in the film but was unable to do so after he was refused entry into the UK.

A reported £20,000 was spent on legal fees to ensure the script was written in a way to not attract lawsuits.

=== Shooting ===
The movie was shot entirely on location in early 1967 and contains much period footage of central London, including shots of Marble Arch, Trafalgar Square, Little Venice and Kensal Green. Shots of the gang meeting up prior to the robbery were filmed at Leyton Orient Football Club during a match with Swindon Town. The gang's airfield hideout was filmed at RAF Graveley. Filming occurred at New York Harbor and Arbour Hill Prison in Dublin. The robbery itself was shot to the east of Theddingworth in Leicestershire.

== Reception ==
=== Box office ===
According to producer Michael Deeley the film did "good business" on release. It was not a big hit in the US; Peter Yates called it "very poorly exploited".

=== Critical ===
The critical response to Robbery over the years was summarised by Peter Elliott in 2014: "Robbery was praised by a number of critics upon its release.... However, time and culture have not been kind to Yates' film, and it has, to a very large extent, been relegated to a footnote in British crime cinema". Beyond critical opinion, the location-shot car chase at the beginning of the film has been very influential. It was seen by Steve McQueen and led him and producer Philip D'Antoni to approve Yates as the director of Bullitt (1968). The car chase in Bullitt has been called "revolutionary" and "one of the most exciting car chases in film history".

Variety called the film "a cleverly-spun suspense story with authentic British locale shooting" and added that "the screenplay [...] deliberately puzzles the action and gives inventive and unexpected twists to the plot which add to the overall suspense. Dialog is minimal and used only when absolutely necessary".

The Evening Standard called it "highly entertaining".

Boxoffice reviewed the film as "crisply photographed, immaculately edited and technically absorbing."

Leslie Halliwell said: "Heavy-going fictionalised account of the famous train robbery of 1963; best seen as standard cops and robbers, with some good chase sequences". Filmink called it "terrific" with "Baker at his scowly best".

The Radio Times Guide to Films gave the film 3/5 stars: "Following the Great Train Robbery of 1963, several film projects were announced, but this is the only British production to have got off the ground. It never fulfils the promise of its opening car chase, during which one vehicle mows down a policeman and a procession of schoolchildren. Thereafter, the plotting and execution of the robbery seems rather trite, and the fictitious characters are not half as colourful as the real-life Ronnie Biggs and company. But there is more action towards the end, enough to impress Hollywood, who summoned Peter Yates to direct Bullitt". (However nobody is mown down in the car chase and it was actually that sequence at the start of the film which earned Yates the Bullitt job.)

=== Awards ===
The film won the best original British screenplay award (for Edward Boyd, Peter Yates, and George Markstein) from the Writers Guild of Great Britain.

== Home media ==
Robbery was released on DVD for the first time in 2008. Before this, the only copies in circulation had been from a VHS release in the 1980s.

In August 2015, a remastered version was released on Kino Lorber Blu-ray and DVD, scanned at 2K and fully restored to its original aspect ratio, along with some special features.
