= The Midnight Plumber =

1957 novel

- Series: Harry Martineau
- Publication date: 1957
- Media type: Print

The Midnight Plumber is a 1957 crime novel by the British writer Maurice Procter. It is the second in his series featuring Chief Inspector Harry Martineau, set in the Northern industrial city of Granchester. It was published in the United States by Harper the following year.

== Synopsis ==
The city is being targeted by a series of burglaries committed by an organised gang led by an anonymous man known only as "The Plumber". They inspire such terror that Martineau finds it nearly impossible to gather any information about their activities.

== Bibliography ==
- Dove, George N. The Police Procedural. Popular Press, 1982.
- Herbert, Rosemary. Whodunit?: A Who's Who in Crime & Mystery Writing. Oxford University Press, 2003.
- Reilly, John M. Twentieth Century Crime & Mystery Writers. Springer, 2015.
- Vicarel, Jo Ann. A Reader's Guide to the Police Procedural. G.K. Hall, 1995.
