= Blue ice =

Blue ice may refer to:

- Blue ice (aviation), formed by leaky aircraft waste tanks
- Blue Ice (film), a 1992 film starring Michael Caine
- Blue ice (glacial), created by glaciers
- Blue-ice area, area in Antarctica where sublimation of ice leads to the development of blue ice
- Blue Ice (video game), a PC video game from Psygnosis
- Blue Ice, a factory ring tone for Nokia cellphones such as the Nokia 1112
- The Blue Ice, a 1948 adventure novel by Hammond Innes
- Blueice, the predecessor of the Bluefire Supercomputer
- Blue Ice Beer, a beer brewed by San Miguel Brewery Hong Kong
- Methamphetamine, CNS stimulant mainly used as a recreational drug
- Rubbermaid Blue Ice, brand name for an ice pack product

== See also ==
- Blue ice runway
