= Black Tide (disambiguation) =

Black Tide is an American heavy metal band.

Black Tide may also refer to:

- Black Tide (novel), 1999 crime novel by Peter Temple
- Black Tide (film), 2018 French film directed by Erick Zonca
- The Black Tide, 1982 novel by Hammond Innes
- Black Tide, a Japanese racehorse born in 2001
