= Solomon's Seal =

Solomon's Seal may refer to:

== Botany ==
- Maianthemum, commonly named "false Solomon's seal", a genus of flowering plants
- Polygonatum, commonly named "Solomon's seal", a genus of flowering plants

== Entertainment ==
- Solomon's Seal (album), a 1972 album by Pentangle
- Solomon's Seal (novel), a 1980 novel by Hammond Innes

== Symbols ==
- Seal of Solomon, a legendary signet ring attributed to the Israelite king Solomon
- Solomon's knot, a traditional decorative motif used since ancient times, and found in many cultures
- Solomon's Seal motif, a Turkish textile motif

== Other uses ==
- Order of the Seal of Solomon, an Ethiopian order of chivalry

== See also ==
- Star of David, a Jewish symbol
