= Acacia aphanoclada =

Nullagine ghost wattle

Conservation status
- Priority One — Poorly Known Taxa (DEC)

Scientific classification
- Kingdom: Plantae
- Clade: Tracheophytes
- Clade: Angiosperms
- Clade: Eudicots
- Clade: Rosids
- Order: Fabales
- Family: Fabaceae
- Subfamily: Caesalpinioideae
- Clade: Mimosoid clade
- Genus: Acacia
- Species: A. aphanoclada

Binomial name
- Acacia aphanoclada Maslin
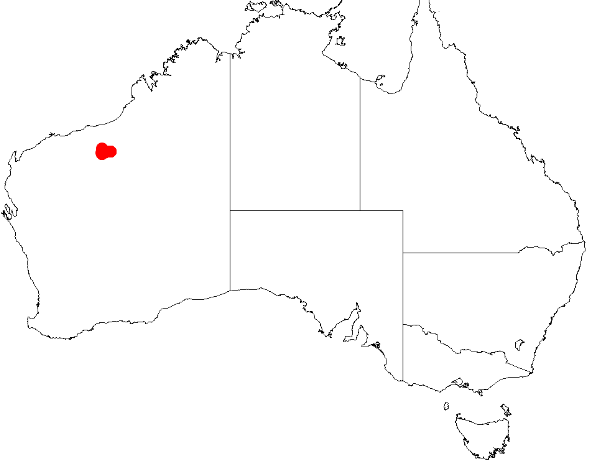
- Occurrence data from AVH

Species of legume

Acacia aphanoclada, also known as Nullagine ghost wattle, is a species of flowering plant in the family Fabaceae and is endemic to a small area in the Pilbara region of Western Australia. It is a glabrous wispy shrub with narrowly linear phyllodes, racemes of spherical heads of golden flowers, and narrowly oblong, papery pods up to 60–70 mm (2.4–2.8 in) long.

== Description ==
Acacia aphanoclada is a glabrous, wispy, single-stemmed shrub that typically grows to a height of up to 1–5 m (3 ft 3 in – 16 ft 5 in) with a dbh of 2 cm (0.79 in), topped by sparse crown foliage mostly found at the ends of the slender drooping branchlets. Its phyllodes are drooping, narrowly linear, mostly 200–450 mm (7.9–17.7 in) long and usually 1.5–2.0 mm (0.059–0.079 in) wide, with a gland on the upper edge of the phyllode 2.6 mm (0.10 in) from the base. The flowers are arranged in racemes in the axils of phyllodes usually 50–90 mm (2.0–3.5 in) long, with spherical heads on a peduncle 10–20 mm (0.39–0.79 in) long. The heads are 10–11 mm (0.39–0.43 in) in diameter and contain 70 to 90 golden flowers. Flowering occurs from August to October, and the legume is a narrowly oblong, papery pod 60–70 mm (2.4–2.8 in) long and 6–8 mm (0.24–0.31 in) wide, containing dark brown, oblong to egg-shaped to almost round seeds 4–5 mm (0.16–0.20 in) long and 3.5–4.5 mm (0.14–0.18 in) wide.

== Taxonomy ==
Acacia aphanoclada was first formally described in 1992 by the botanist Bruce Maslin in the journal Nuytsia from specimens collected near Nullagine in 1973. The specific epithet (aphanoclada) is taken from the Greek word aphanes meaning 'unseen' or 'invisible' and klados meaning 'branch', alluding to the wispy growth habit, slender stems and open crowns of this species, that make it hard to detect in the field.

== Distribution and habitat ==
Nullagine ghost wattle is sparsely distributed around the small town of Nullagine to the north of Newman in the Pilbara region of north western Western Australia. It is often situated amongst rocky hills, rises and slopes in skeletal sediments and soils of conglomerate. The shrub is usually part of spinifex communities with associated Eucalyptus and other Acacia species.

== Conservation status ==
Acacia aphanoclada is listed as "Priority One" by the Government of Western Australia Department of Biodiversity, Conservation and Attractions, meaning that it is known from only one or a few locations where it is potentially at risk.

== See also ==
- List of Acacia species
