= Nullagine, Western Australia =

Nullagine
- Town
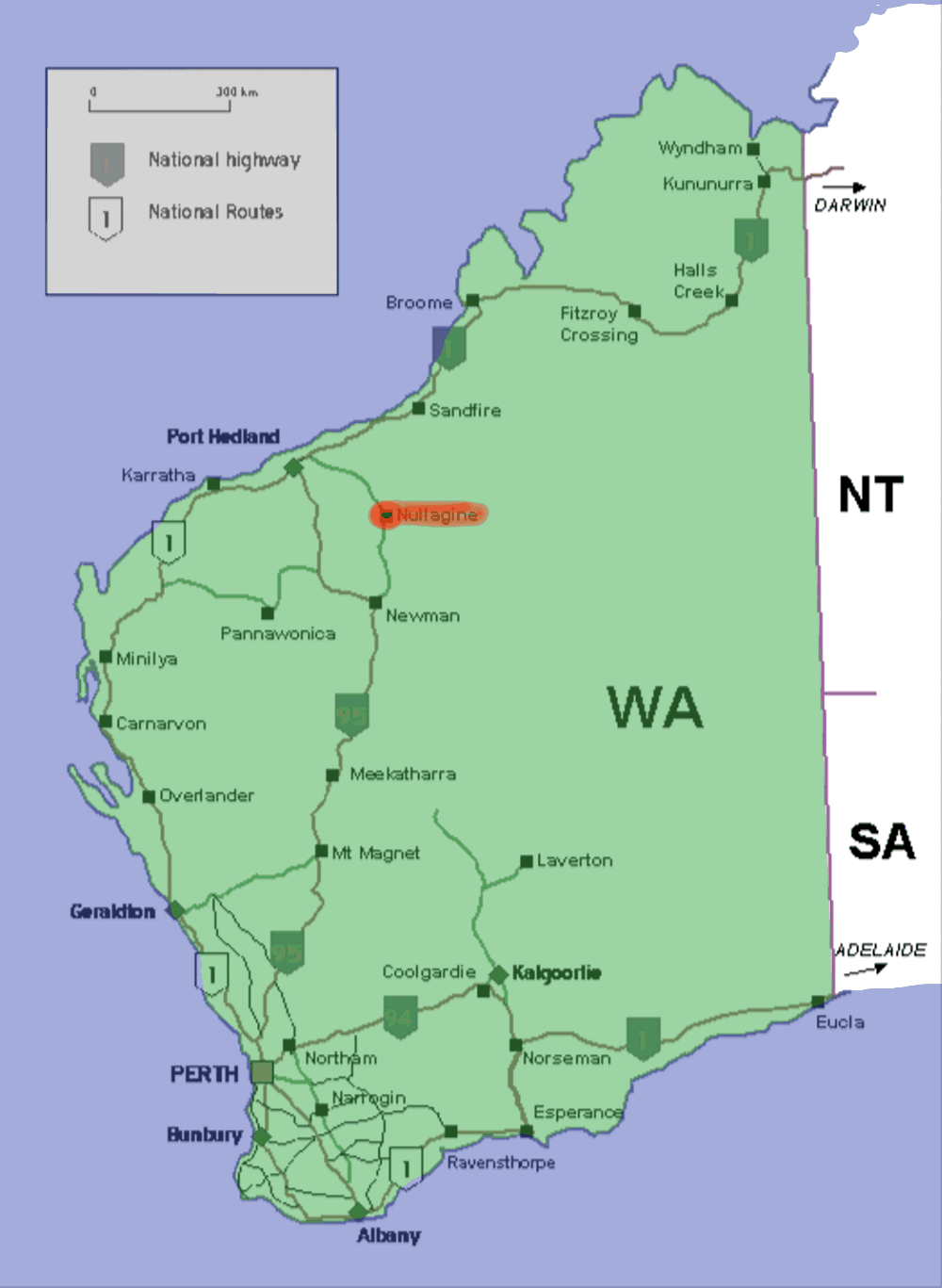
- Location of Nullagine in Western Australia (red)

- Interactive map of Nullagine
- Coordinates: 21°53′17″S 120°06′25″E
- Country: Australia
- State: Western Australia
- LGA: Shire of East Pilbara
- Location: 1,364 km (848 mi) NNE of Perth; 296 km (184 mi) SE of Port Hedland; 97 km (60 mi) S of Marble Bar
- Established: 1899

Government
  - State electorate: Pilbara
  - Federal division: Durack

Area
  - Total: 21,884.4 km^{2} (8,449.6 sq mi)
- Elevation: 412 m (1,352 ft)

Population
  - Total: 147 (UCL 2021)
- Postcode: 6758
- Mean max temp: 34 °C (93 °F)
- Mean min temp: 11 °C (52 °F)
- Annual rainfall: 100 mm (3.9 in)

Nullagine is an old gold rush town in Western Australia's Pilbara region. It is located on the Nullagine River 296 km south-east of Port Hedland and 1,364 km north-north-east of Perth on the old Great Northern Highway.

The town originated from gold being discovered in the area in 1886 by a prospector, N.W. Cooke. The population increased sharply as a result and by the mid-1890s the community wanted to have a town declared. Lots were surveyed and released in 1897 and the state government gazetted the town in 1899.

The name Nullagine comes from the Aboriginal name of a nearby river, the Ngullagine river; the meaning of the word is unknown.

Besides gold other minerals were mined in the area including diamonds and other gemstones.

Between 1895 and 1914, the town boomed and contained a number of general stores, three hotels, eight stamp mills and a population of over 3,000.

Its population was 1,500 prior to World War II. Now, with the decline of gold mining, only about 200 remain. However the town still attracts fossickers and prospectors who visit the surrounding area, which is particularly rich in minerals such as gold, agate, asbestos, beryl, chalcedony, jade, jasper, tiger's eye and ores of antimony, copper, manganese and tungsten.

The town is also the place of the Yirrangadji Aboriginal Community. The Martu people make up the bulk of this population.

== Iron ore ==
Iron ore deposits to the south-west may lead to a revival of the town. A company called BC Iron, which took its name from the Bonnie creek “paleochannel” system of ancient river beds in the Pilbara region of Western Australia, believes it has a chance of proving up between 200 million and 600 million tonnes of pisolitic (pea-shaped) iron oxide in what was once a diamond exploration location. With iron ore prices continuing to rise in 2008, that translates into a potential bonanza with an in-ground value of up to A$30 billion. The three-stage challenge for BC will be first in proving that it has the ore in the ground, that it is of a quality that Asian steel mills want to buy, and that it can secure a transport route to the coast, and find room at a port for handling exports. Because the size of the ore deposit at Bonnie Creek is too small to justify its own railway to the port, the company has negotiated a "mine gate" joint venture with Fortescue to use the Fortescue railway line in exchange for half the mine's output.

Fortescue builds a 133 MW wind power plant in the area to supply some of the power for its mining operations.

== Film ==
Hammond Innes' 1973 novel Golden Soak was adapted into a six-part television series in 1979, part of which was filmed in Nullagine. It starred Ray Barrett in the lead role.

== See also ==
- Bill Dunn (Pilbara elder)
