= List of preserved Vickers aircraft =

List of Vickers aircraft in preservation

This article is a list of aircraft that were manufactured by Vickers and are in preservation.

== List ==
=== Valiant ===
Aircraft	Photograph	Build date	First flight	Last flight	Operator	Location	Status	Notes	Ref.
XD818		1956	September 4th, 1956	January 1965	Royal Air Force	Royal Air Force Museum Midlands, RAF Cosford, Shropshire, England	On static display		
XD816		1956	1956	1968	Royal Air Force	Brooklands Museum Weybridge, Surrey, England	On static display	Cockpit only	
XD875		1957	August 27th, 1957	November 9th, 1962	Royal Air Force	Morayvia, Kinloss, Moray, Scotland	On static display	Last Vickers Valiant ever built. Cockpit in preservation	
XD826		1956	December 15th, 1956	December 1964	Royal Air Force	Imperial War Museum at Duxford, Cambridgeshire, England	On static display	Cockpit only	
XD857		1957	January 5th, 1957	February 19th, 1965	Royal Air Force	Norfolk and Suffolk Aviation Museum at Flixton, Suffolk, England	On static display	Cockpit only	

=== Vanguard ===
Aircraft	Photograph	Type	Build date	First flight	Last flight	Operator	Location	Status	Notes	Ref.
G-APEJ		953/953C	1961	August 16th, 1961	December 24th, 1992	British European Airways; British Airways; Air Bridge; Hunting Cargo Airlines	Brooklands Museum, Surrey, England	On static display	Named "Ajax" by Air Bridge and Hunting Cargo Airlines. Nose only on static display	
G-APEP		953/953C	1961	December 13th, 1961	September 30th, 1996 - October 17th, 1996	British European Airways; British Airways; Air Bridge; Hunting Cargo Airlines	Brooklands Museum, Surrey, England	On static display	Named "Superb" by Air Bridge and Hunting Cargo Airlines	
G-APES		953/953C	1962	January 24th, 1962	May 1975 (British Airways); February 4th, 1995 (Hunting Cargo Airlines)	British European Airways; British Airways; Air Bridge; Hunting Cargo Airlines	East Midlands Aeropark, England	On static display	Named "Swiftsure" by Air Bridge and Hunting Cargo Airlines. Nose only on static display	

=== Viscount ===
Aircraft	Photograph	Type	Build date	First flight	Last flight	Operator	Location	Status	Notes	Ref.
G-ALWF		701A	1952	December 1952	December 24th, 1971	British European Airways; Channel Airways	Imperial War Museum at Duxford, Cambridgeshire, England	On static display	Named "Sir John Franklin"	
G-AMOG		701	1953	February 11th, 1953	March 31st, 1976	British European Airways; Cambrian Airways; British Overseas Airways Corporation; British Airways	National Museum of Flight, East Fortune, East Lothian, Scotland	On static display	Named "Sir Robert Falcon Scott"	
PP-SRO		701C	1955	May 4th, 1955	February 28th, 1969	British European Airways; Viação Aérea São Paulo	Museu Eduardo André Matarazzo, Jardim Recantro, Bebedouro, State of São Paulo, Brazil	On static display	Named "R. M. A. William Dampier" by British European Airways	
F-BGNR		708	October 12th, 1953 - December 11th, 1953	May 6th, 1954	December 1996	Danish Air Charter; Air Inter/Lignes Aériennes Intérieures	Midland Air Museum, Coventry Airport, Warwickshire, England	On static display	Once named "Victoria Lynne"	
F-BGNU		708	January 25th, 1954 - March 10th, 1954	July 5th, 1954	March 26th, 1975	Air France; Air Viet Nam; Air France; Air Inter/Lignes Aériennes Intérieures	Sinsheim Auto & Technik Museum, Sinsheim, Germany	On static display		
VH-TVR		953C	1958	November 19th, 1958	April 4th, 1970	Trans-Australia Airlines	Australian National Aviation Museum, Moorabbin, Victoria, Australia	On static display	Named "John Murray"	

=== VC-10 ===
Aircraft	Photograph	Type	Build date	First flight	Last flight	Operator	Location	Status	Notes	Ref.
G-ARVF		1101	1963	July 6th, 1963	Spring 1981	British Overseas Airways Corporation; British Airways; United Arab Emirates Government	Flugausstellung Hermeskeil at Hermeskeil, Germany	On static display		
G-ARVM		1101	1964	July 6th, 1964	October 22nd, 1979	British Overseas Airways Corporation; British Airways	Brooklands Museum, Weybridge, Surrey, England	On static display	Fuselage only	
A4O-AB/G-ASIX		1103	1964	October 17th, 1964	July 5th, 1987	British United Airways; Caledonian Airways; British Caledonian; Royal Flight of Oman	Brooklands Museum, Weybridge, Surrey, England	On static display	Named "Loch Maree" by Caledonian Airways, British United Airways and British Caledonian.	
G-ASGC		1151	1965	January 1st, 1965	April 22nd, 1980	BOAC-Cunard	Imperial War Museum, Duxford, Cambridgeshire, England	On static display		
ZA148/5Y-ADA		1164	1967	March 21st, 1967	August 28th, 2013	East African Airways; Royal Air Force	South Wales Aviation Museum, Bro Tathan North, St Athan, Vale of Glamorgan, Wales	On static display		
ZA149/5X-UVJ		1164	1969	April 19th, 1969	March 18th, 2013	East African Airways; Royal Air Force	Al Mahatta Museum, Sharjah, Emirate of Sharjah, United Arab Emirates	On static display		
ZA150/5H-MOG		1164	1970	February 16th, 1970	September 20th, 2013 - September 24th, 2013	East African Airways; Royal Air Force	Kepler Aerospace	Awaiting restoration to airworthy status		
XR808		1180	1966	June 9th, 1966	July 29th, 2013	Royal Air Force	Royal Air Force Museum Midlands, Cosford, Shropshire, England	On static display	Named "Kenneth Campbell VC, Hugh Malcolm VC & Thomas Mottershead VC" by the Royal Air Force.	
XV106		1180	1967	November 17th, 1967	July 26th, 2017	United States Air Force	Avro Heritage Museum, Woodford, Greater Manchester, England	On static display	Named "Thomas Mottershead VC, W" by the Royal Air Force. Forward fuselage only in preservation	
XV108		1180	1968	June 7th, 1968	November 7th, 2012	Royal Air Force	East Midlands Aeropark, England	On static display	Named "William Rhodes-Moorhouse VC" by the Royal Air Force. Forward fuselage only in preservation	

== Formerly preserved, scrapped ==
=== VC-10 ===
Aircraft	Model	Photograph	Build date	First flight	Last flight	Operator	Last seen	Scrap date	Cause of scrapping	Notes	Ref.
ZD241	K.4		April 11th, 1963	26 February 1968	May 7th, 1980	British Overseas Airways Corporation; Royal Air Force	Bruntingthorpe Aerodrome, Leicestershire, England, United Kingdom	April 20th, 2022	Aging Airframe, Lack of Air Tanker Conversion, Dismantling for Spares and Research		
ZA147	K.3		March 1965	October 12th, 1966	September 2013	East African Airways; Royal Air Force	Bruntingthorpe Aerodrome, Leicestershire, England, United Kingdom	November 2021	Aging airframe	Cockpit section was saved for preservation	
