= The Doomed Oasis =

1960 novel by Hammond Innes

- First edition
- Author: Hammond Innes
- Language: English
- Genre: Thriller
- Publisher: Collins
- Publication date: 1960
- Publication place: United Kingdom
- Media type: Print
- Pages: 336

The Doomed Oasis is a 1960 thriller novel by the British writer Hammond Innes. A solicitor helps a young man to travel to the Arabian Peninsula to find his father, a famous oil prospector Colonel Charles Whitaker.

== Plot ==
Publishers of the novel offered the following overview of the book's plot: "Charles Whitaker is a Welshman who forsakes his native country for the deserts of Arabia. Adapting quickly to this hostile terrain, he soon becomes more Bedouin than British. Whitaker's illegtimate son, David, sets out to find his father. He in turn is followed by a Welsh solicitor who hopes to reunite the two men. The story moves at two levels: One involves a desperate struggle for desert oil; the second, hardly less intense, for father and son to find each other. Both struggles are resolved at Saraifa, the doomed oasis of the title."

== Reception ==
In his review of the novel, Robert Wilfred Franson only gives The Doomed Oasis a qualified recommendation, stating that Hammond Innes does what he sets out to do, but the sum of the parts is not wholly satisfactory.

== Adaptations ==
A dramatized audio adaptation of The Doomed Oasis featuring six half-hour episodes adapted by Rene Basilico was broadcast on BBC Radio 4 Extra. The production starred Tim Munro as George Grant, was produced by John Fawcett Wilson, and was first broadcast on BBC Radio 2 in August 1984.

== Bibliography ==
- James Vinson & D. L. Kirkpatrick. Contemporary Novelists. St. James Press, 1986.
