= The Wreck of the Mary Deare =

1956 novel by Hammond Innes

- First UK edition (publ. Collins)
- Author: Hammond Innes
- Language: English
- Publication date: 1956

The Wreck of the Mary Deare (in the UK published as The Mary Deare) is a 1956 novel written by British author Hammond Innes, which was later adapted as a film starring Gary Cooper released in 1959 by MGM. According to Jack Adrian, the book "at a stroke launched him into that rarefied empyrean most writers yearn for though few attain, supersellerdom."

The success of the book - and the 1959 film based on it starring Gary Cooper - enabled Innes to buy his own 42 ft ocean racer, which he named Mary Deare.

== Plot ==
The book tells the story of a very old ship described as "a deathtrap of rattling rivets", which is found adrift at sea by salvager John Sands. Sands boards it hoping to claim it for salvage, but finds the first officer, Gideon Patch, still aboard and trying to run the ship on his own. Patch convinces Sands to help him beach the ship, even though it will void his salvage claim. When they return to London, Patch is brought before a board of inquiry to determine what happened. It soon becomes apparent that the shipowners were planning to wreck the Mary Deare all along and have Patch as the fall guy.

== See also ==
- Mary Celeste
