= The Wreck of the Mary Deare (film) =

1959 film by Michael Anderson

- Theatrical release poster
- Directed by: Michael Anderson
- Screenplay by: Eric Ambler
- Based on: The Wreck of the Mary Deare; 1956 novel by Hammond Innes
- Produced by: Julian Blaustein
- Starring: Gary Cooper; Charlton Heston
- Cinematography: Joseph Ruttenberg
- Edited by: Eda Warren
- Music by: George Duning
- Production company: Blaustein-Baroda
- Distributed by: Metro-Goldwyn-Mayer
- Release date: November 6, 1959 (US)
- Running time: 104 minutes
- Countries: United Kingdom; United States
- Language: English
- Budget: $2,596,000
- Box office: $2,815,000

The Wreck of the Mary Deare is a 1959 Metrocolor (in CinemaScope) British-American thriller film directed by Michael Anderson and starring Gary Cooper (in his penultimate film) and Charlton Heston, and featuring Michael Redgrave, Cecil Parker, Virginia McKenna, Richard Harris, and John Le Mesurier. The screenplay by Eric Ambler was based on the 1956 novel of the same name by Hammond Innes.

== Plot ==
A phantom cargo ship is found adrift at sea in a storm in the English Channel by a marine salvage team aboard the Sea Witch. She is the steamship Mary Deare, out of Hong Kong. John Sands boards it hoping to claim it for himself and his partner, Mike, but finds former First Officer Gideon Patch alone but still in command. He has been Captain for four days since the death of its original skipper, Captain Taggart. Patch describes two fires, a dynamiting, and having been hit on the head and left unconscious when the crew abandoned the vessel.

After Patch refuses to let the ship be claimed for salvage, Sands tries to get back to his tug, but cannot because of the storm; Patch saves his life by pulling him back onto the Mary Deare. Sands reluctantly joins him in running the ship, stoking the boilers in the flooded engine room to get up steam.

In order to ensure the ship will stay above water until an official inspection by a board of inquiry in England, Patch insists on grounding it in shallow water in the dangerous region of the Minquiers.

When the two reach land, Sands learns that the survivors among the crew, led by Second Officer Higgins, are claiming that Patch gave an unnecessary order to abandon ship. A boat containing the officers who were not allies of Higgins was lost, and the survivors are claiming Patch was responsible for the deaths of those men. A report in the press indicates the ship's owner has filed a claim for three-quarters of a million dollars for the loss of his ship.

The owner and the ship’s insurance company put pressure on Patch and Sands, who remains Patch's ally. Patch visits Captain Taggart's daughter Janet, who lets him borrow a page of a letter from her father that mentions being anchored for days beside another ship in the harbour at Rangoon.

Patch's story gradually emerges: Higgins and his allies were in a conspiracy with the shipowner in which they offloaded their most valuable cargo, American jet engines which were surplus parts from the Korean War, to the other ship at Rangoon to sell them to the Communist Chinese. Before reaching their final port in England they set fire to the radio room so no distress signals could be sent, blew a hole in the Mary Deare's hull with dynamite, and set another fire in a coal bunker, with the intention of sending the ship to the bottom. The scheme proved too much for the alcoholic Captain Taggart, who evidently suffered a breakdown.

Patch finally gets his board of inquiry, but it goes badly for him. The lawyer for the owner presents Higgins' story as the credible record of events. The judges do not allow Patch to read his version of events into the record. The lawyer then announces that the ship has been found by an aerial survey, and a French salvage crew will attempt to refloat it. Janet, who suspects the owner's party, tells Patch that Higgins will be on board. Patch explains that in its weakened condition it will be easy for one man to sink the vessel in deep water, covering up for good the conspiracy and its crimes.

Patch attempts to steal the Sea Witch to get to the Mary Deare, but Sands and his partner Mike catch up to him before he can set out to sea. Together they make for the Minquiers. There they don diving suits, enter the ship through the dynamite hole, and confirm that the engine crates are filled with ballast stones and not engines.

Higgins spots the pair’s underwater lights, then traps them in the flooded hold. When they seek to swim to safety further aft, he lies in wait and spears Sands. Patch and Sands then drag him into the water and subdue him. The French salvagers report what happened to the authorities. Sands tells Patch he is in line for a substantial reward, which he declines, saying, all he ever wanted was to prove the truth of what had happened so he could maintain his master’s ticket and get another ship to command.

== Cast ==
- Gary Cooper as Gideon Patch
- Charlton Heston as John Sands
- Michael Redgrave as Mr Nyland
- Emlyn Williams as Sir Wilfred Falcett
- Cecil Parker as The Chairman
- Alexander Knox as Petrie
- Virginia McKenna as Janet Taggart
- Richard Harris as Higgins
- Ben Wright as Mike
- Peter Illing as Gunderson
- Terence De Marney as Frank
- Charles Davis as Yules, Quartermaster on Mary Deare
- Ashley Cowan as Burrows

== Production ==
The novel was optioned by Metro-Goldwyn-Mayer with the intention of having Alfred Hitchcock direct the picture (under a two-picture deal), starring Gary Cooper and Burt Lancaster. Hitchcock had long wanted to work with Cooper, who had been asked to star in Foreign Correspondent in 1940, and Lancaster, who had been asked to star in Under Capricorn in 1948. After developing the script with Ernest Lehman for several weeks, they concluded that it could not be done without turning the film into "a boring courtroom drama". They abandoned the idea and started a new story which eventually became North by Northwest.

The task of adapting the novel passed to Eric Ambler. British director Michael Anderson took over for Hitchcock. The cast included Cooper as Patch, and Charlton Heston as Sands, with Richard Harris and Sir Michael Redgrave in supporting roles. Critics generally agree that the finished film matches Hitchcock and Lehman's prediction. There were long delays in filming due to Gary Cooper's ill health, although he was not diagnosed with cancer until the spring of 1960.

== Box office ==
According to MGM records the film earned $1,165,000 in the US and Canada and $1,650,000 elsewhere, turning a profit of $200,000 on a production budget of $2.6 million.

== See also ==
- List of American films of 1959
- List of unproduced Hitchcock projects
