= The Land God Gave to Cain =

1958 novel by Hammond Innes

- First edition
- Author: Hammond Innes
- Language: English
- Genre: Adventure fiction
- Publisher: Collins
- Publication date: 1958
- Publication place: United Kingdom
- Media type: Print

The Land God Gave to Cain is a 1958 adventure novel by the British writer Hammond Innes. It was published in the UK by Collins and in the United States by Knopf. After a plane crash in a remote part of Labrador, a British civil engineer heads out to investigate based on some radio messages his father has overheard.

The construction of the Quebec North Shore and Labrador Railway forms the backdrop for the novel. In 1953 Innes spent a period of time with the crews building the railway during his research.
