= Campbell's Kingdom (novel) =

1952 novel by Hammond Innes

- First edition
- Author: Hammond Innes
- Cover artist: Kenneth Farnhill
- Language: English
- Genre: Thriller
- Publisher: Collins
- Publication date: 1952
- Publication place: United Kingdom
- Media type: Print

Campbell's Kingdom is a 1952 thriller novel by the British writer Hammond Innes. A British man, ill and largely inactive since the Second World War, inherits land in the Canadian Rockies. He travels there to investigate his grandfather's instinct that there are valuable oil reserves under the land.

Innes wrote about his travels in Canada to research Campbell's Kingdom in Chapter 5 of his non-fiction book Harvest of Journeys (1960).

== Film adaptation ==
In 1957, the book was made into a British film of the same name directed by Ralph Thomas and starring Dirk Bogarde, Stanley Baker, Michael Craig, and Barbara Murray.

== Bibliography ==
- Goble, Alan. The Complete Index to Literary Sources in Film. Walter de Gruyter, 1999.
