= Killer Mine =

1947 novel by the British writer Hammond Innes

- First edition
- Author: Hammond Innes
- Language: English
- Genre: Thriller
- Publisher: Collins
- Publication date: 1947
- Publication place: United Kingdom
- Media type: Print

Killer Mine or The Killer Mine is a 1947 thriller novel by the British writer Hammond Innes. Jim Pryce, a deserter from the British Army, returns clandestinely from Italy aboard the ship Arisaig to his native Cornwall, but is left on a beach having been robbed, beaten, and implicated in murder. Seeking to use his mining expertise, he becomes involved in an attempt to re-open the abandoned and flooded Wheal Garth mine owned by the elderly Manack, but Manack's son and his henchmen force him to drill a sea entrance from one of the mine galleries to be used for smuggling liquor. His only ally is the girl, Kitty, who delivers him a letter from his long-dead mother and hints that her death was not an accident, but part of a plot by which old Manack gained control of the mine.

In the United States it was published by Harper as Run by Night.

== Bibliography ==
- James Vinson & D. L. Kirkpatrick. Contemporary Novelists. St. James Press, 1986.
