= Wreckers Must Breathe =

1940 novel by Hammond Innes

- First edition
- Author: Hammond Innes
- Language: English
- Genre: Thriller
- Publisher: Collins
- Publication date: 1940
- Publication place: United Kingdom
- Media type: Print

Wreckers Must Breathe is a 1940 thriller novel by the British writer Hammond Innes. It was published in the United States by Putnam's under the title Trapped. Set in the early stages of the Second World War, it tells a story about German U-boats operating from a secret base in Cornwall. The title refers to the tradition of wrecking on the Cornish coast.

== Bibliography ==
- James Vinson & D. L. Kirkpatrick. Contemporary Novelists. St. James Press, 1986.
- Duncan Redford. The Submarine: A Cultural History from the Great War to Nuclear Combat. I.B.Tauris, 2015.
