= North Star (novel) =

1974 novel by Hammond Innes

- First edition
- Author: Hammond Innes
- Language: English
- Genre: Thriller
- Publisher: Collins
- Publication date: 1974
- Publication place: United Kingdom
- Media type: Print

North Star is a 1974 British thriller novel by Hammond Innes. A man tries to prevent a plot to blow up a North Sea oil rig.

== Bibliography ==
- James Vinson & D. L. Kirkpatrick. Contemporary Novelists. St. James Press, 1986.
