= The Trojan Horse (novel) =

1940 novel by Hammond Innes

- First edition
- Author: Hammond Innes
- Language: English
- Genre: Thriller
- Publisher: Collins
- Publication date: 1940
- Publication place: United Kingdom
- Media type: Print

The Trojan Horse is a 1940 thriller novel by the British writer Hammond Innes. A London lawyer decides to help a German inventor suspected of murder.

== Bibliography ==
- James Vinson & D. L. Kirkpatrick. Contemporary Novelists. St. James Press, 1986.
