= The Doppelganger (Innes novel) =

1936 novel by Hammond Innes

- First edition cover
- Author: Hammond Innes
- Language: English
- Genre: Thriller
- Publisher: Herbert Jenkins Limited
- Publication date: 1936
- Publication place: United Kingdom
- Media type: Print

The Doppelganger is a 1936 thriller novel by the British writer Hammond Innes. Set in 1930s London, the story follows Peter Deveril, ace crime reporter for the Record who is sent out to interview shipping magnate Sir Charles Merrick. In search of a scoop about a big financial deal, he gets a lot more than he bargained for. Sir Charles appears in multiple places, including crime scenes where he seems to be the criminal, all while witnesses prove he was never there. The Merrick Double Mystery becomes a newspaper sensation. The word "Doppelganger" leaps into the headlines and Peter finds himself fighting everyone, from the police to his editor, in his attempt to solve the mystery, as fear of the supernatural grips London.

== Reception ==
At the novel's first publication, a review in The Citizen praised the novel's fast-paced and suspenseful plot. Another review, in the Birmingham Gazette, described the novel as "breathlessly exciting--until the identity of the doppelganger has perforce to be disclosed at long last--when one's incredulity damps the pleasure."
