= The Angry Mountain =

1950 novel by Hammond Innes

- First edition
- Author: Hammond Innes
- Language: English
- Genre: Thriller
- Publisher: Collins
- Publication date: 1950
- Publication place: United Kingdom
- Media type: Print

The Angry Mountain is a 1950 thriller novel by the British writer Hammond Innes. An Englishman still tortured by his wartime experiences, gets drawn into intrigue in Czechoslovakia and Italy.

Innes was in San Sebastiano when Vesuvius erupted and lava rolled over the village.

== Bibliography ==
- James Vinson & D. L. Kirkpatrick. Contemporary Novelists. St. James Press, 1986.
