= The Lonely Skier =

1947 novel by Hammond Innes

- First edition
- Author: Hammond Innes
- Language: English
- Genre: Thriller
- Publisher: Collins
- Publication date: 1947
- Publication place: United Kingdom
- Media type: Print

The Lonely Skier is a 1947 thriller novel by British writer Hammond Innes. It is set in the Dolomites where a number of people are hunting a stash of buried Nazi treasure. The hero Neil Blair, recently demobbed from the army and unemployed, is hired to go to an isolated ski resort and pretend he is writing a screenplay.

In 1948 it was adapted into a film Snowbound directed by David MacDonald for Gainsborough Pictures and starring Dennis Price, Robert Newton and Herbert Lom.

Jack Adrian relates how Innes completed an arduous skiing course in the Italian Dolomites before he was demobbed. It was, said Innes, "Stiffer than any army course I was ever on, including battle training." His experiences were used as the background for the novel.

== Bibliography ==
- Goble, Alan. The Complete Index to Literary Sources in Film. Walter de Gruyter, 1999.
