= Dead and Alive (Innes novel) =

1946 novel by Hammond Innes

First edition (publ. Collins)

Dead and Alive is the first post-war novel of Hammond Innes. It is based on his own experience as an army major in Italy. Jack Adrian relates that "the manuscript...emerged with him when he was demobbed, just after completing an arduous skiing course in the Italian Dolomites.
