= Attack Alarm =

1941 novel by Hammond Innes

- First edition
- Author: Hammond Innes
- Language: English
- Genre: Thriller
- Publisher: Collins
- Publication date: 1941
- Publication place: United Kingdom
- Media type: Print

Attack Alarm is a 1941 thriller novel by the British writer Hammond Innes. It was inspired by the author's own experience as an anti-aircraft gunner at RAF Kenley during the Battle of Britain. In fact, according to Adrian Jack, the manuscript "was written on a gun-site after he had joined the Royal Artillery".

It was published in the United States the following year by Macmillan.

== Synopsis ==
In the summer of 1940, as the battle between the British and German air forces continues a former Fleet Street journalist now a gunner serving in an anti-aircraft battery begins to suspect that there may be a plot on the ground even more dangerous to his country than the enemy planes.

== Bibliography ==
- James Vinson & D. L. Kirkpatrick. Contemporary Novelists. St. James Press, 1986.
