= The Strode Venturer =

1965 novel by Hammond Innes

- First edition cover (UK)
- Author: Hammond Innes
- Cover artist: Kenneth Farnhill
- Language: English
- Genre: Thriller Novel
- Publisher: Collins (UK)
- Publication date: 1965
- Publication place: United Kingdom
- Pages: 319

The Strode Venturer is a thriller by British author Hammond Innes published in 1965.

== Plot ==
Geoffrey Bailey returns to London, leaving behind a career in the Royal Navy and a ruined marriage in Singapore. He becomes involved in the affairs of the Strode Shipping Company, the company which ruined his father's shipping firm, with a job offer to locate the black sheep of the Strode clan, Peter Strode, who was last seen in Aden. Bailey eventually locates Peter Strode in Addu, in the southern Maldive Islands, where he is obsessed with helping the nascent Addu People's Republic against the Maldive government, and with relocating an uninhabited island in the southern Indian Ocean which is rich in manganese deposits which can both help the Adduan people and the financially failing Strode Shipping Company. However, the ruling Strode brothers have other plans, which do not necessarily include the return of either Peter Strode or Bailey to London. In addition to the dangers of volcanic islands and the unexplored ocean, Bailey must also face the dangers of boardroom politics and financial warfare in civilised London.

The Strode Venturer is notable for strong characterization and the exploration of such themes as family honour, the bounds of loyalty and man's relationship to nature, themes which would continue in Innes' later works.

Like many of Innes' novels, the hero faces all sorts of obstacles, which he has to overcome, including a family tragedy. The psychological characterization of the hero gives the book an added interest.

An adaptation of the book was broadcast in BBC radio 4's Saturday Night Theatre in 1974, with Martin Jarvis playing Peter Strode.
