= Maddon's Rock =

1948 novel by Hammond Innes

- First edition
- Author: Hammond Innes
- Language: English
- Genre: Thriller
- Publisher: Collins
- Publication date: 1948
- Publication place: United Kingdom
- Media type: Print

Maddon's Rock is a 1948 thriller novel by the British writer Hammond Innes published by Collins. The following year it was released in America by Harper with the alternative title of Gale Warning. To research the novel Innes crewed on a friend's yacht in the Fastnet Race.

== Synopsis ==
A merchant ship is torpedoed and sunk during a winter return convoy from the Soviet Union in 1945, and several members of its crew are court-martialed and jailed for their conduct during the evacuation to the lifeboats. Another regrettable yet unremarkable incident of war seems set to be forgotten, until a year later, during a gale on another brutal winter night in the northern seas, when a ship that everyone knows to be sunk sends an SOS calling for help.

== Bibliography ==
- James Vinson & D. L. Kirkpatrick. Contemporary Novelists. St. James Press, 1986.
