= The Big Footprints =

1977 novel by Hammond Innes

- First edition
- Author: Hammond Innes
- Language: English
- Genre: Thriller
- Publisher: Collins
- Publication date: 1977
- Publication place: United Kingdom
- Media type: Print

The Big Footprints is a 1977 thriller novel by the British writer Hammond Innes. A British television director, Colin Tait, representing the BBC (on contract) and his American counterpart, Abe Finkel, representing CBS, get drawn into a battle between two old rivals in Kenya. Alex Kirby-Smith is a hunter with a government contract to cull elephants (an important source of food and ivory) so the land can be used for cattle and crops, while his rival, Cornelius van Delden, is trying to preserve the elephants. Since there is a drought, van Delden feels that there is no need for culling the herd, while Kirby-Smith is determined to fulfill his government contract. Tait wants to enlist van Delden to take him to a mountain called Porr on the east shore of Lake Rudolf (then forbidden territory) to investigate some rumored ancient rock dwellings, while Finkel is enamored with elephants, so convinces Tait to let him tag along. The inevitable clash between van Delden and Kirby-Smith leads to murders, both human and animal.

== Bibliography ==
- James Vinson & D. L. Kirkpatrick. Contemporary Novelists. St. James Press, 1986.
