= Vickers =

British engineering company

- Industry: Engineering
- Founded: 1828
- Founder: Edward Vickers
- Defunct: 1999
- Fate: Acquired
- Successor: Rolls-Royce plc
- Headquarters: London, England
- Products: Aircraft; Armaments; Ships
- Subsidiaries: Metropolitan-Vickers

Vickers was a British engineering company that existed from 1828 until 1999. It was formed in Sheffield as a steel foundry by Edward Vickers and his father-in-law, and soon became famous for casting church bells. The company went public in 1867, acquired more businesses, and began branching out into military hardware and shipbuilding.

In 1911, the company expanded into aircraft manufacturing and opened a flying school. During World War One it was one of the main armaments manufacturers of the Allied nations. Post-war it expanded even further, into electrical and railway manufacturing, and in 1928 acquired an interest in the aircraft manufacturer Supermarine.

Beginning in the 1960s, various parts of the company were nationalised, and in 1999 the rest of the company was acquired by Rolls-Royce plc, which sold the defence arm to Alvis plc. The Vickers name lived on in Alvis Vickers, until the latter was acquired by BAE Systems in 2004 to form BAE Systems Land Systems.

== History ==
=== Early history ===
Vickers was formed in Sheffield as a steel foundry by Edward Vickers and his father-in-law George Naylor in 1828. Naylor was a partner in the foundry Naylor & Sanderson and Vickers' brother William owned a steel rolling operation. Edward's investments in the railway industry allowed him to gain control of the company, based at Millsands and known as Naylor Vickers and Company. It began by making steel castings and quickly became famous for casting church bells. In 1854 Vickers' sons Thomas (a militia officer known familiarly as 'Colonel Tom') and Albert joined the business and their considerable talents – Tom Vickers as a metallurgist and Albert as a team-builder and salesman – were key to its subsequent rapid development. "Its great architects," the historian Clive Trebilcock writes, "Colonel T.E. (1833–1915) and Albert (1838–1919) Vickers... provided both inspired technical leadership... and equally astute commercial direction. Both men were autocrats by temperament, but neither shunned advice or avoided delegation; each, but particularly Albert, had a marked gift for the selection of talented subordinates."

In 1863 the company moved to a new site in Sheffield on the River Don in Brightside.

=== Vickers, Sons & Company ===
The company went public in 1867 as Vickers, Sons & Company and gradually acquired more businesses, branching out into various sectors. In 1868 Vickers began to manufacture marine shafts, in 1872 they began casting marine propellers and in 1882 they set up a forging press. They were also supplying steel forgings for gun barrel manufacturers, including their future main competitor Armstrong, as early as 1870.

After a decline in lucrative tool steel demand in the US during the first half of 1880s, the stockholders logically decided in spring 1887 to diversify into large-scale armaments production and approved £1.5 million (1887, equivalent to £172.83 million in 2023) capital increase. By the end of 1888 Vickers produced and tested both their first artillery piece and first armour plate. The Naval Defence Act 1889 increased domestic demand and the invention of nickel steel armour rendering compound armour obsolete.

=== Vickers, Sons & Maxim ===
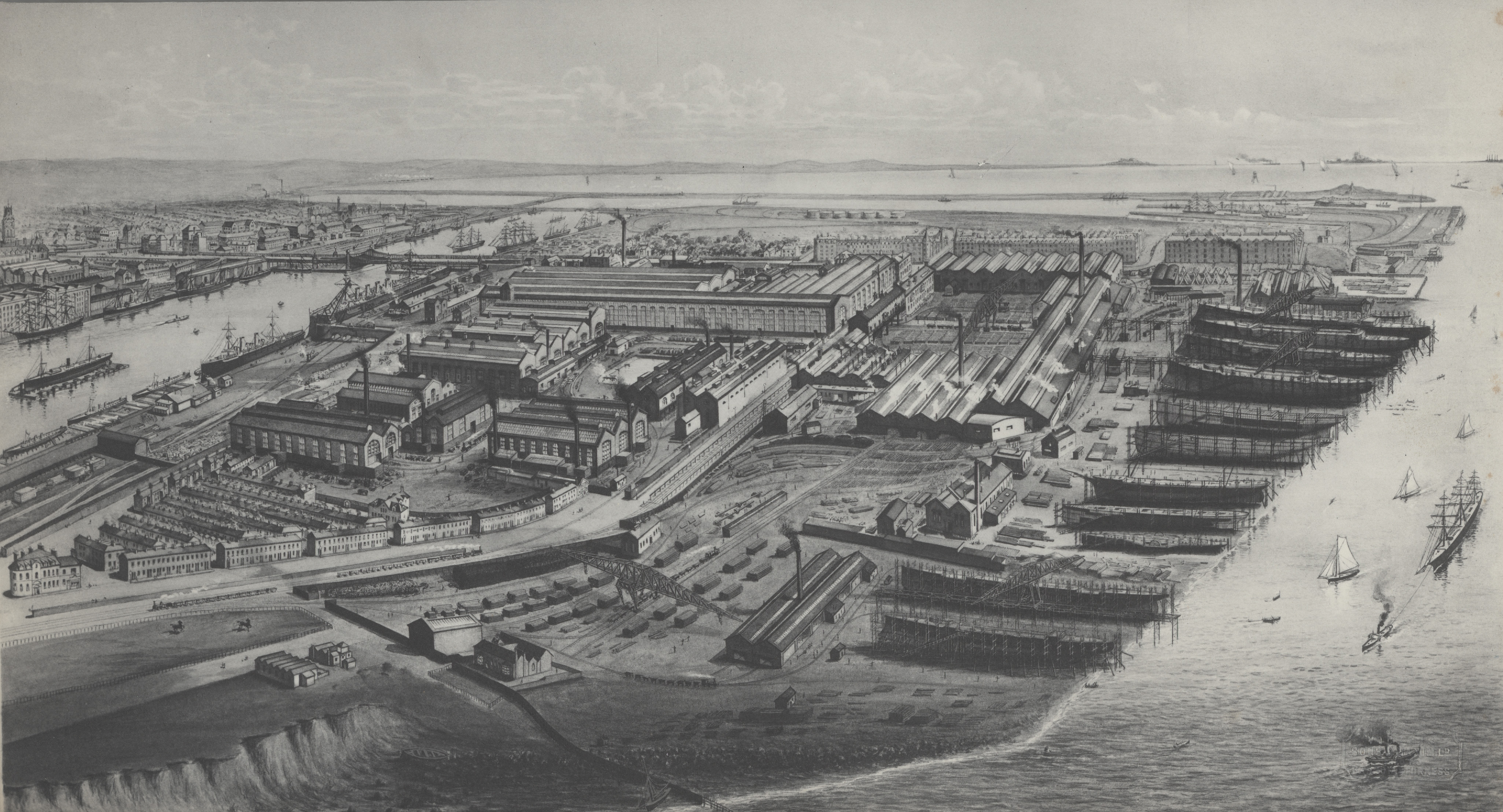
Vickers, Sons & Maxim's Naval Construction Works (c. 1900)

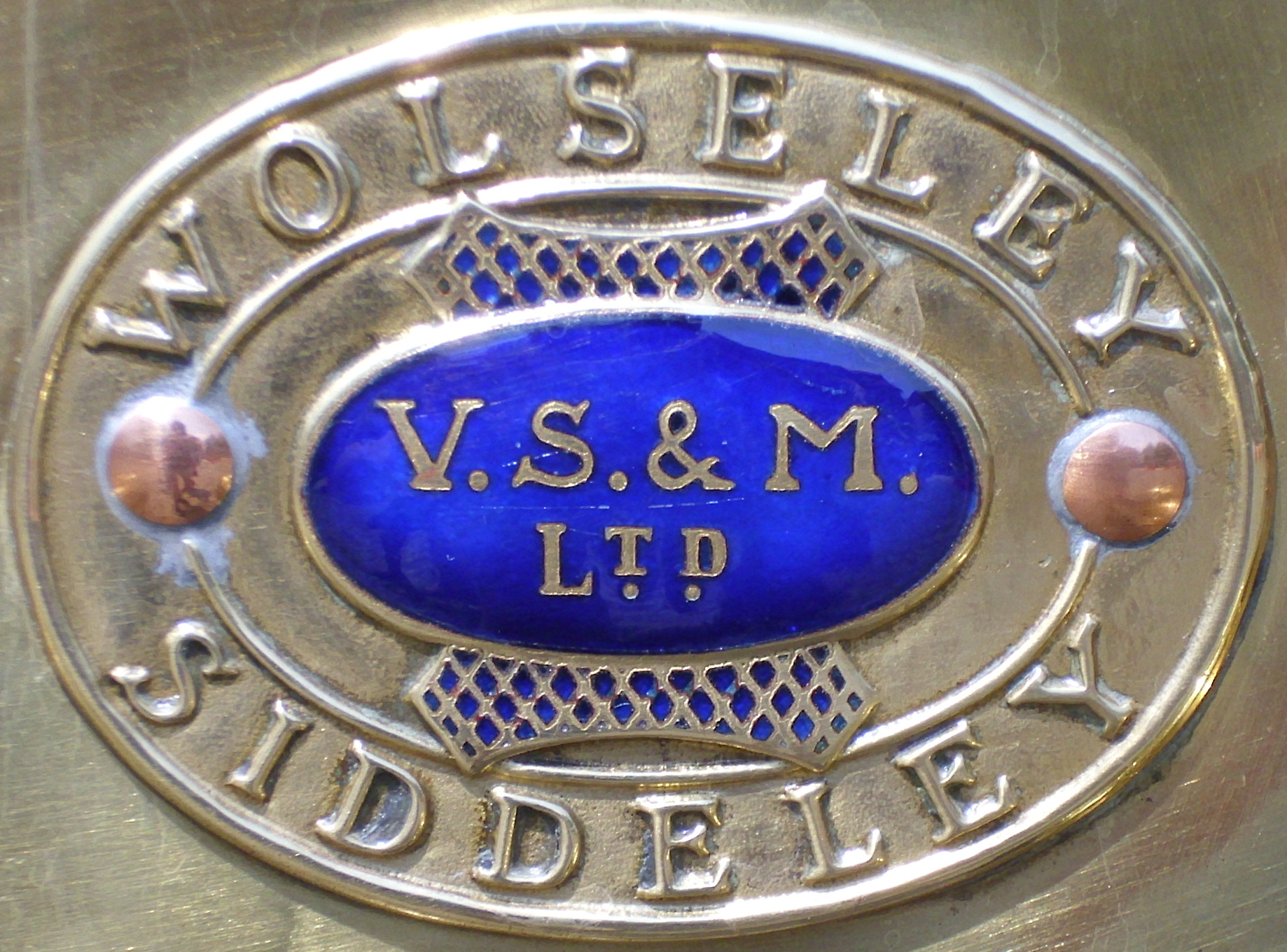
Name plate: Vickers, Sons & Maxim Wolseley Siddeley

Vickers bought out the Barrow-in-Furness shipbuilder The Barrow Shipbuilding Company in 1897, acquiring its subsidiary the Maxim Nordenfelt Guns and Ammunition Company at the same time, to become Vickers, Sons & Maxim.

Ordnance and ammunition made during this period, including World War I, was stamped V.S.M.

The yard at Barrow became the "Construction Yard". With these acquisitions, Vickers could now produce a complete selection of products, from ships and marine fittings to armour plate and a whole suite of ordnance. In 1901 the Royal Navy's first submarine, Holland 1, was launched at the Naval Construction Yard. In 1902 Vickers took a half share in the famous Clyde shipyard John Brown & Company.

Further diversification occurred in 1901 with the acquisition of a proposed business which was incorporated as The Wolseley Tool and Motor Car Company and in 1905 the goodwill and patent rights of the Siddeley car. In 1911 a controlling interest was acquired in torpedo manufacturer Whitehead & Company.

=== Vickers Limited ===
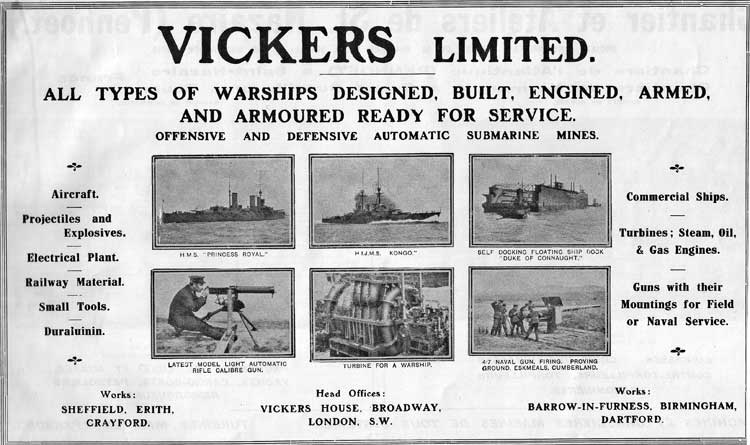
1914 advertisement in Jane's presenting Vickers broad naval capabilities

In 1911 the company name was changed to Vickers Ltd and expanded its operations into aircraft manufacture by the formation of Vickers Ltd (Aviation Department) and a Vickers School of Flying was opened at Brooklands, Surrey on 20 January 1912. In 1919, the British Westinghouse electrical company was taken over as the Metropolitan Vickers Electrical Company; Metrovick. At the same time they came into Metropolitan's railway interests.

=== Reorganisation ===
A reorganisation during 1926 led to the retention of the rolling stock group: Metropolitan Carriage Wagon and Finance Company and The Metropolitan -Vickers Company and the disposal of: Vickers-Petters Limited, British Lighting and Ignition Company, the Plywood department at Crayford Creek, Canadian Vickers, William Beardmore and Co, and Wolseley Motors.

=== Merger with Armstrong Whitworth ===
In 1927, Vickers merged with Tyneside based engineering company Armstrong Whitworth to become Vickers-Armstrongs. Armstrong Whitworth had developed along similar lines to Vickers, expanding into various military sectors and was notable for their artillery manufacture at Elswick and shipbuilding at a yard at High Walker on the River Tyne. Armstrongs shipbuilding interests became the "Naval Yard", those of Vickers on the west coast the "Naval Construction Yard". Armstrong Whitworth Aircraft was not absorbed by the new company.

In 1928, the Aviation Department became Vickers (Aviation) Ltd and soon after acquired Supermarine, which became the "Supermarine Aviation Works (Vickers) Ltd". In 1938, both companies were re-organised as Vickers-Armstrongs (Aircraft) Ltd, although the former Supermarine and Vickers works continued to brand their products under their former names. 1929 saw the merger of the acquired railway business with those of Cammell Laird to form Metropolitan Cammell Carriage & Wagon.

=== Nationalisation ===
In 1960, the aircraft interests were merged with those of the Bristol, English Electric and Hunting Aircraft to form the British Aircraft Corporation (BAC). This was owned by Vickers, English Electric and Bristol (holding 40%, 40% and 20% respectively). BAC in turn owned 70% of Hunting. The Supermarine operation was closed in 1963 and the Vickers name for aircraft was dropped in 1965. Under the terms of the Aircraft and Shipbuilding Industries Act BAC was nationalised in 1977 to become part of British Aerospace, which exists today in the guise of BAE Systems.

The Aircraft and Shipbuilding Industries Act also led to the nationalisation of Vickers' shipbuilding division as part of British Shipbuilders. These had been renamed Vickers Armstrong Shipbuilders in 1955, changing again to Vickers Limited Shipbuilding Group in 1968. This division was privatised as Vickers Shipbuilding & Engineering in 1986, later part of GEC's Marconi Marine. It remains in operation to this day as BAE Systems Submarines.

=== Vickers plc ===
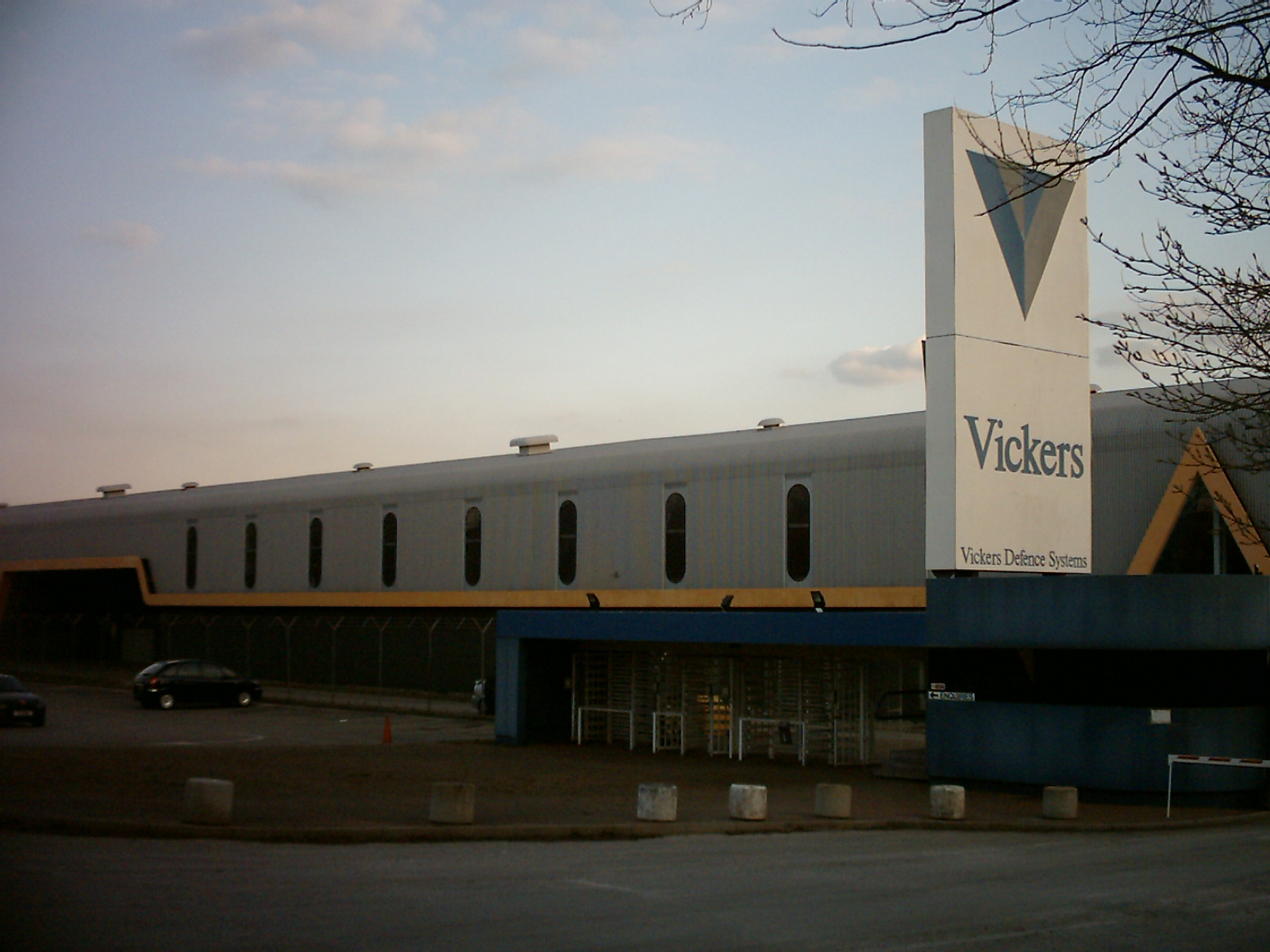
The Vickers works in Cross Gates, Leeds

With their steelworking operations also nationalised into British Steel Corporation the remnants of Vickers became Vickers plc. In 1986, Vickers acquired the armaments manufacturer Royal Ordnance Factory, Leeds, which became Vickers Defence Systems. Other acquisitions included automotive engineers Cosworth in 1990, waterjet manufacturer Kamewa in 1986 and Norwegian marine propulsion and engineering company Ulstein in 1998. 1998 also saw the sale of Rolls-Royce Motors and Cosworth to Volkswagen Group for £430 million, beating out BMW's offer of £340 million.

=== Current status of Vickers ===
In 1927, Vickers merged with the Tyneside-based engineering firm Armstrong Whitworth to form Vickers-Armstrongs. Armstrong Whitworth developed in a similar way to Vickers, expanding into various military fields and became famous for its artillery construction at Elswick and shipbuilding at its yard at High Walker upon Tyne. In 1928, the Aviation Department changed its name to Vickers (Aviation) Ltd and shortly afterwards acquired Supermarine, which became 'Supermarine Aviation Works (Vickers) Ltd'. In 1938, the two companies were reorganised as Vickers-Armstrongs (Aircraft) Ltd, although the former Supermarine and Vickers works continued to brand their products under their former names. In 1929, the acquired railway business was merged with that of Cammell Laird to form Metropolitan Cammell Carriage & Wagon.

=== Fifth change of the company ===
After the Second World War Vickers-Armstrongs manufactured commercial aircraft. In 1959 it introduced the VC10 jet aircraft and in the same year the government forced a merger with Bristol Aeroplane Company, English Electric and Hunting Aircraft to form the British Aircraft Corporation (BAC). Alongside the achievements of BAC, the Hawker Siddeley Group were also experiencing success with the likes of the Hawker Harrier 'Jump Jet' and Hawker Siddeley Trident passenger aircraft. The two companies competed side by side for contracts throughout the 1960s and early 1970s, until the British Government expressed a desire for the two entities to merge. Finally, on 29 April 1977, the two companies were finally nationalised and a new company, British Aerospace Plc, emerged. The rail business acquired by Vickers was sold to Alstom in 1989.

== See also ==
- Canadian Vickers, a Vickers subsidiary from 1911 to 1944
- List of preserved Vickers aircraft
- Oto Melara, an Italian weapons manufacturer, originally a joint venture between Vickers and Terni Steelworks
- Supermarine
- Vickers hardness test
- Vickers machine gun
