= The Strange Land =

1954 novel by Hammond Innes

- First edition
- Author: Hammond Innes
- Cover artist: John Rose
- Language: English
- Genre: Thriller
- Publisher: Collins
- Publication date: 1954
- Publication place: United Kingdom
- Media type: Print

The Strange Land is a 1954 thriller novel by the British writer Hammond Innes. It was released in the United States by Knopf under the alternative title The Naked Land.

It is set in the far south of French Morocco, where a mission station is awaiting the arrival of a new Czech Doctor.

== Bibliography ==
- James Vinson & D. L. Kirkpatrick. Contemporary Novelists. St. James Press, 1986.
