= Campbell's Kingdom =

1957 British film by Ralph Thomas

- Original British film poster
- Directed by: Ralph Thomas
- Screenplay by: Robin Estridge
- Based on: Campbell's Kingdom by Hammond Innes
- Produced by: Betty Box
- Starring: Dirk Bogarde; Stanley Baker; Michael Craig; Barbara Murray
- Cinematography: Ernest Steward
- Edited by: Frederick Wilson
- Music by: Clifton Parker
- Production company: The Rank Organisation
- Distributed by: J. Arthur Rank Film Distributors
- Release date: 3 September 1957
- Running time: 102 minutes
- Country: United Kingdom
- Language: English

Campbell's Kingdom is a 1957 British adventure film directed by Ralph Thomas, based on the 1952 novel of the same name by Hammond Innes. The film stars Dirk Bogarde and Stanley Baker, with Michael Craig, Barbara Murray, James Robertson Justice and Sid James in support. The story is set in Alberta, Canada, and largely follows the principles of the Northwestern genre of film-making.

== Plot ==
Recently diagnosed with a terminal disease, Bruce Campbell unexpectedly finds himself the owner of a small valley in the Canadian Rocky Mountains as the result of a bequest from his grandfather. After travelling from England, Bruce arrives at "Campbell's Kingdom", as the locals disparagingly call it, to find its existence under threat from the construction of a new hydroelectricity dam. Convinced that his grandfather was right and that the Kingdom might yield oil, the race is on to prove that there is oil under Campbell's Kingdom before the mining company building the dam can flood the valley. Standing in his way is corrupt construction contractor Owen Morgan, who resorts to dirty tricks in order to prevent Campbell from succeeding in his quest. However, Bruce is ably and enthusiastically assisted by love interest Jean Lucas, geologist Boy Bladen and drilling contractor James MacDonald. Unfortunately for Campbell the residents of the nearby town of Come Lucky invested heavily in his grandfather's schemes, only to feel cheated when his projects came to nothing. Gradually Bruce manages to turn them around by exposing the fraud and lies of Morgan and the mining company.

== Cast ==
- Dirk Bogarde as Bruce Campbell
- Stanley Baker as Owen Morgan
- Michael Craig as Boy Bladen
- Barbara Murray as Jean Lucas
- James Robertson Justice as James MacDonald
- Athene Seyler as Miss Abigail
- Robert Brown as Ben Creasy
- John Laurie as Mac
- Sid James as Sam
- Mary Merrall as Miss Ruth
- George Murcell as Max
- Roland Brand as Driver
- Finlay Currie as Old Man
- Peter Illing as the Doctor
- Maurice Kaufmann as Man at Golden Calf
- Stanley Maxted as Henry Fergus

== Production ==
=== Development ===
Hammond Innes's novel was published in 1952 and was based on the Canadian oil boom of the late 1940s. Innes researched the novel extensively and it was a best seller.

The story was serialised as Nothing to Lose. Film rights were purchased prior to the novel's publication by the producing-directing team of Betty Box and Ralph Thomas, who had just made The Venetian Bird (1952) for the Rank Organisation. Location scouting for the film began in August 1952, with Box and Thomas touring the Canadian Rockies. It was part of conscious decision from Rank to film more abroad.

"That serial title refers to the hero's special armour", said Ralph Thomas in September 1952. "He's a young Canadian whose friends help him strike oil on a piece of land willed by his grandfather to disprove the general belief that the old man was unhinged. And he happens to be fatally stricken. He's a dying man."

"There's quite a bit of room for suspense", said Betty Box. "For one thing a big oil company is obstructing him. Our climax will have the gusher flooded by a break in a huge dam. With an ingenious twist."

Eric Ambler was assigned to write the script. In 1954 Jack Hawkins and Shelley Winters were mentioned as possible stars.

However, because it was an expensive project the film took a number of years to be financed. Box and Thomas had a major box office hit in Doctor in the House (1954) which turned Dirk Bogarde into a star. Bogarde became attached to Campbell's Kingdom. The film was almost made after Doctor at Sea (1955) when there was a financial crisis in the British film industry and Rank requested Box, Thomas and Bogarde make a third "Doctor" film, Doctor at Large (1957), instead. While this was done, Box, Ambler and Innes worked on the script to reduce the budget.

The tremendous success of Doctor at Large led to Rank financing Campbell's Kingdom. "We'd all earned a change of subject, we felt", wrote Box later. Stanley Baker had just made Checkpoint for Box and Thomas.

The film would be one of a number of films made by the Rank Organisation in the 1950s to appeal to the international market. They tended to be adventure films shot on location overseas in colour based on some best selling novel. Other examples include Windom's Way (1957), Robbery Under Arms (1957), The Wind Cannot Read (1958), Nor the Moon by Night (1958) and Ferry to Hong Kong (1959).

Box said Eric Ambler had a very different approach to writing to Hammond Innes. "Innes was a writer who spent as much time researching his books as he did writing them", she wrote. "Eric's books depend much more on characterisation, motivation and ideologies rather than realistic documentation. I remember him telling me that he hadn't even visited most of the countries he wrote about, and I sensed that he wasn't entirely happy working on Campbell's Kingdom." Another writer, Robin Estridge, was hired to work on the script.

Ray Milland had tried to buy the rights to the novel. He offered to play the role of Campbell for no cash payment and a percentage of the profits, but Rank cast Bogarde.

Michael Craig, who had a support role, felt Bogarde was "an unlikely choice since he was small and slender and not overly athletic" but "I think he wanted to change his image into something more robust, but the sight of him threatening to knock the block off some burly oil driller in a Canadian bar was more ludicrous that robust.".

=== Shooting ===
Although the story is set in Alberta, it was too expensive to film there. Box wrote, "In those days dollars were very scarce, the Treasury didn't want to know and by shooting in Europe we would save a considerable amount of money that would have been spent in transporting people and equipment across the Atlantic and on to the foothills of the Rockies." The landscape exteriors were shot in the Italian Dolomites (Lago di Pontesei and Cortina d'Ampezzo locality Fiames) and the rest was shot at Pinewood Studios outside London.

Filming took place in May 1957. "This is a big outdoor subject, although at the same time I hope it will be more subtle than that,” said Thomas during the shoot. “I think Dirk’s character will give the story subtlety. Most heroes do things so courageous and unlikely that they are often only just acceptable. But Dirk’s Bruce Campbell is a man with death just around the corner and what he does is done in that knowledge.”

Betty Box says three of the cast brought their wives on location to Italy – Michael Craig, Stanley Baker and Sid James – and all three were pregnant. Art director Maurice Carter recalled they had to build "a cable-car which had to be capable of carrying a lorry. It wasn’t possible to fake it, they had to be on it and a lot of shooting was done from it. They took terrible risks by overloading it, although I'd built it as best I could with Italian labour — and in the snow, working in the most bitter cold."

== Reception ==
=== Box office ===
Box later wrote that the film "was released during one of Britain's worst flu epidemics – Asian flu – which didn't help at the box office" but that "overseas the movie was successful. We even sold it to the Russians. It took me an hour or two to work that one out... The dam bursts because the wicked capitalists in Canada use cheap cement!"

The film was listed in Screen magazine as one of the most popular at the British box office in 1957.

In September 1957 Kinematograph Weekly reported the film was "in the money at the Odeon, Leicester Square, and everything points to a profitable general release. Dirk Bogarde, its leading man, definitely has a way with the womenfolk, be they young or old. And the film’s red meat is artfully flavoured and spectacularly served."

However it is generally considered to have been a box office disappointment. The movie did not make the Kinematograph Weekly list of most popular films of 1957.

=== Critical ===
Variety called it "virtually a British western. It is a straightforward, virile, actionpacked yarn with ample excitement and mounting drama. A popular cast, headed by Dirk Bogarde, will make it a safe bet. Bogarde’s star value in U. S, may, however, be insufficient to earn this satisfying pic the support it merits."

The Daily Telegraph called it "exciting popular entertainment."

=== Awards ===
Dirk Bogarde won the Picturegoer Award for Best Actor for the film.

The film was released in the US in 1960.

=== Contemporary reputation ===
Richard Gregson, film producer, agent and brother of actor Michael Craig, later gave Campbell's Kingdom as an example of the output of Rank under Sir John Davis in the late 50s:

Those awful middle class pictures that had no meaning for anyone, because somehow he couldn't come to terms with the fact that the vast majority of people in this country were lower middle class and working class people. So all those boring tales like Campbell's Kingdom had nothing to do with real life. If you are clever enough as Korda and Balcon were, you can get away with it, but Davis wasn't. It was very square entertainment.

BFI Screenonline said Campbell's Kingdom, along with later Bogarde-Box-Thomas adventure films such as The Wind Cannot Read and The High Bright Sun (1964) "could have benefited from a more conventionally rugged leading man" than Bogarde.

Filmink called it "a so-so adventure tale – the team of Betty Box and Ralph Thomas deserved the right to make something different, as did Dirk Bogarde, but all were kind of miscast in this genre."

== Notes ==
- Box, Betty, Lifting the Lid, The Book Guild, 2000
