= Atlantic Fury =

1962 thriller novel by Hammond Innes

- First edition
- Author: Hammond Innes
- Language: English
- Genre: Thriller
- Publisher: Collins
- Publication date: 1962
- Publication place: United Kingdom
- Media type: Print

Atlantic Fury is a 1962 thriller novel by the British writer Hammond Innes. A man investigates the death of his brother in a military disaster in the Outer Hebrides.

== Bibliography ==
- James Vinson & D. L. Kirkpatrick. Contemporary Novelists. St. James Press, 1986.
