= Snowbound (1948 film) =

1948 film

- Directed by: David MacDonald
- Written by: Keith Campbell; David Evans
- Based on: the novel The Lonely Skier by Hammond Innes
- Produced by: Aubrey Baring executive Sydney Box
- Starring: Robert Newton; Dennis Price; Stanley Holloway; Herbert Lom; Marcel Dalio; Guy Middleton; Mila Parély
- Cinematography: Stephen Dade; Reg Johnson
- Edited by: James Needs
- Music by: Cedric Thorpe Davie
- Production company: Gainsborough Pictures
- Distributed by: General Film Distributors; RKO Radio Pictures
- Release date: 3 May 1948
- Running time: 90 minutes
- Country: United Kingdom
- Language: English
- Box office: £120,000 by 1953

Snowbound is a 1948 British thriller film directed by David MacDonald and starring Robert Newton, Dennis Price, Stanley Holloway, Herbert Lom, Marcel Dalio and Guy Middleton and introducing Mila Parély. Based on the 1947 novel The Lonely Skier by Hammond Innes, the film concerns a group of people searching for treasure hidden by the Nazis in the Alps following the Second World War.

== Plot ==
British film director Derek Engles recognises Neil Blair, an extra on his set, as he prepares to shoot a scene. He calls him out to have a private chat with him.

In order to investigate some intelligence that he has picked up in Italy, Engles offers Blair a job as he trusts him (he used to be Blair's commanding officer). He wants Blair to inform him of the activities of everyone staying at a ski lodge, while posing as a scriptwriter. Blair accepts this offer and travels to the Italian Alps where he meets the cameraman Joe Wesson, who is part of a setup which makes it look as if they are making a film. Wesson is unaware that no real film is planned.

A hotel in the valley directs them to a mountain-top lodge where they will be able to get rooms. The innkeeper, Aldo, tells Blair there are no rooms available. However, they force their way upstairs and encounter Stefano Valdini, who is staying as a guest. He helps them to overcome the language barrier and get a room each. Back down in the bar they both encounter another man who claims to have booked a room but has been told by Aldo none are available: Wesson tells him to just go upstairs and claim an empty room he has seen at the end of the corridor. At a later point he introduces himself as Gilbert Mayne. Blair soon encounters the Comtessa Forelli through Valdini. He claims to have met her before in Naples but she denies this. He next meets a Greek named Keramikos who also arrives the same evening.

When Blair makes his first report, Engles is particularly interested that the lodge is to be auctioned off the next day. The proprietor of a nearby hotel tells Blair that the auction will be rigged in his favour, but instead a heated bidding contest takes place, with a lawyer for an unknown party making an excessive winning bid.

Keramikos tells Blair that he knows he is not really writing a script and also claims that Mayne was a deserter from the British Army who worked for him in Greece. Blair begins falling in love with the Comtessa, who admits her real name is Carla Rometta. Also, Blair hears Keramikos speaking German with another man, understanding the conversation as he speaks a degree of German himself.

The next day Mayne invites Blair to go skiing. When Blair is made to crash by Mayne and is knocked unconscious, Mayne leaves him behind in the freezing snow and just reports by telephone to Wesson that Blair is missing. Carla overhears and telephones Mancini, who organises a search party, and Blair is rescued.

Engles arrives at the lodge, just before a snowstorm that leaves all the parties stranded for the night. At dinner, Engles confirms he was a colonel in British Intelligence and identifies Keramikos as Von Kellerman, a former Gestapo special agent based in Venice. When Italy was being over-run by the Allies, Kellerman was ordered to transport the gold reserves of the Bank of Italy to Germany. He assigned the task to Captain Heinrich Stelben, unaware Stelben was involved with Carla Rometta. At Carla's urging, Stelben left the gold at the lodge and, after shooting his own men, reported they had been ambushed. One of the men was not killed but only wounded, and Kellerman learned of the gold's whereabouts, with which he wants to finance the rebuilding of a new fascist Germany.

When Carla attacks Mayne after learning that he had agreed to kill her and Valdini (and that it was Mayne who had paid the 4.5m lira to buy the lodge at auction), he knocks her unconscious. Valdini throws a knife at him but misses and Mayne shoots him dead. Mayne is knifed in the back by Aldo on Kellerman's order. Kellerman produces a pistol, has Carla locked up, and orders the Englishmen to dig for the gold in the cellar. Mayne comes to and tries to free Carla but knocks over a lamp that sets the building on fire, then succumbs. When no gold is found, Kellerman does not believe that Engles does not know where it is and shoots him. In the ensuing fight, Wesson drags the unconscious Blair out of the basement. The burning lodge collapses on the others. Carla reveals that she knows where the gold is but, cradling Blair, declares she will never reveal its location, as it has caused too many deaths.

== Cast ==
- Robert Newton as Derek Engles
- Dennis Price as Neil Blair
- Stanley Holloway as Joe Wesson
- Herbert Lom as Von Kellerman, alias Keramikos
- Marcel Dalio as Stefano Valdini
- Mila Parély as Carla Rometta
- Willy Fueter as Aldo, innkeeper
- Guy Middleton as Gilbert Mayne
- Richard Molinas as Mancini, rental agent
- Catherina Ferraz as Emilia, innkeeper's wife
- Gilbert Davis as commissionaire
- Massino Coen as auctioneer
- Rositer Shepherd as lawyer
- Lionel Grose as Corporal Holtz
- William Price as Stelben
- Zena Marshall as Italian girl

== Production ==
Hammond Innes' novel The Lonely Skier was published in 1947. Film rights were bought by Sydney Box at Gainsborough Studios. The film involved location shooting in the French Alps. A unit was sent to shoot exteriors in the Alps while director David MacDonald finished Good Time Girl for Gainsborough.

Studio filming at the Lime Grove Studios in Shepherd's Bush took place in July 1947. The film's sets were designed by the art directors Maurice Carter and George Provis.

== Reception ==
=== Critical ===
The March 1948 Variety review was not especially favourable, stating that the "Main failing of the yarn is that situations do not thrill sufficiently", and "For the romantic interest Mila Parely was imported from Paris, an experiment difficult to justify by results." In the same year Kine Weekly called the film a "Pretentious pot-boiler," adding "The imposing cast does its best with the theatrical plot, but the action does not warm up until the last two reels and then only because of a spectacular fire sequence. Although interspersed with a few exhilarating ski-ing interludes, it's too staged to cut much ice at the universal box office." The Los Angeles Times reviewer in February 1949 wrote that "the British flair for making gripping spine chillers explodes excitingly" in the film.

Halliwell's Film Guide considers it "a rather foolish story which provides little in the way of action but at least assembles a fine crop of character actors."

Radio Times reviewer Tony Sloman wrote that the film "too often betrays its pulp novel roots among resolutely studio-bound snow. Nevertheless, the cast is splendid. [...] Director David MacDonald ploughs through the tosh with a certain conviction, achieving a fine sense of claustrophobia".

In British Sound Films: The Studio Years 1928–1959 David Quinlan rated the film as "good", writing: "Claustophobic thriller is slow developing, gets more exciting towards the end."

=== Box-office ===
By July 1953, the film earned a net revenue of £120,000.
