= Hammond Innes =

British novelist (1913–1998)

- Born: Ralph Hammond Innes; 15 July 1913; Horsham, West Sussex, England
- Died: 10 June 1998 (aged 84)
- Occupations: Novelist, journalist
- Spouse: Dorothy Mary Lang (m. 1937; died 1989)

Ralph Hammond Innes (15 July 1913 – 10 June 1998) was a British novelist who wrote over 30 novels, as well as works for children and travel books.

== Biography ==
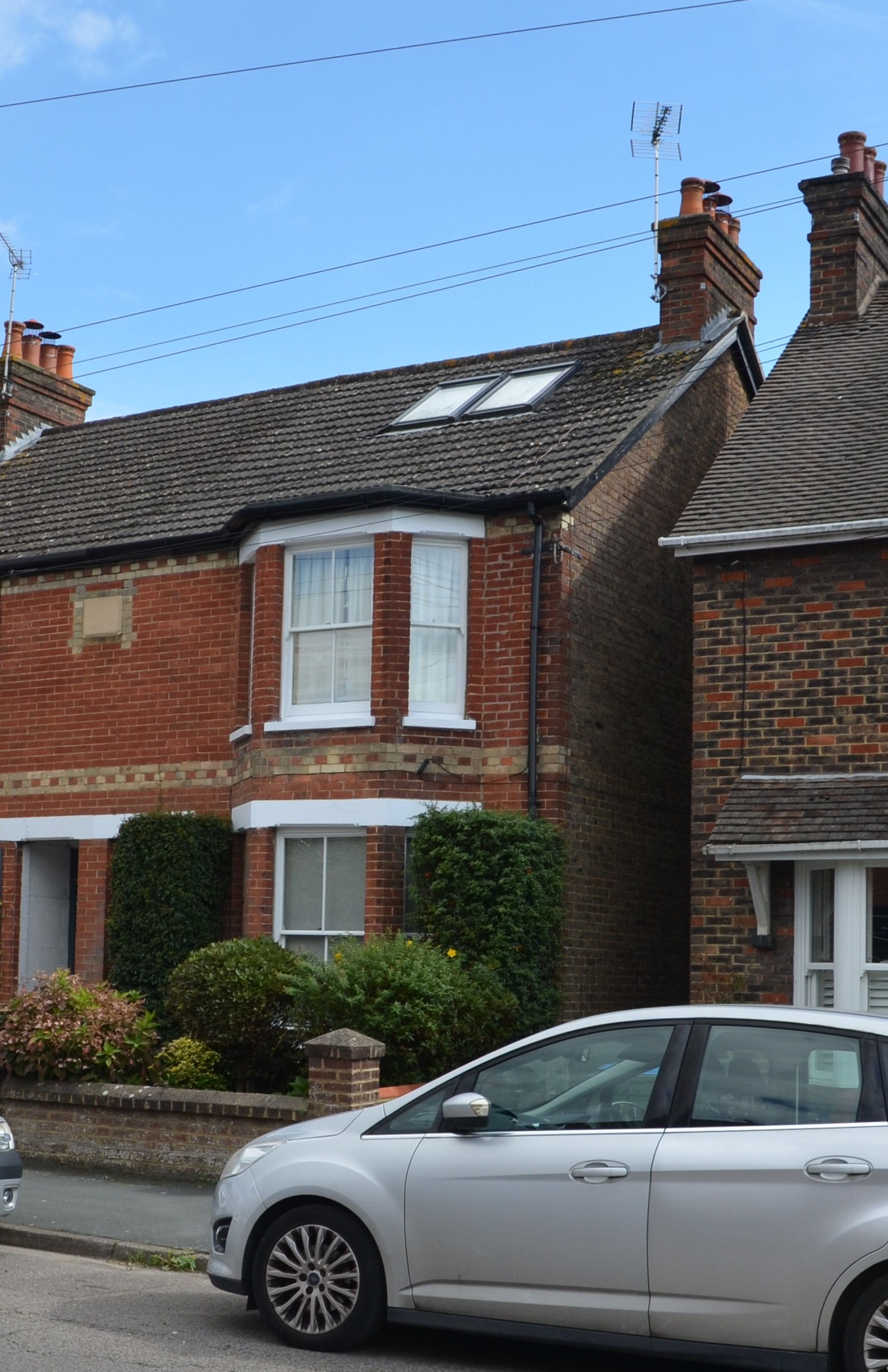
68 Clarence Road, Horsham, West Sussex, where Hammond Innes was born.

Innes was born in Horsham, Sussex, and educated at Feltonfleet School, Cobham, Surrey, where he was head boy, and later at Cranbrook School in Kent. He left in 1931 to work as a journalist, initially with the Financial News.

His first novel, The Doppelganger, was published in 1937. In WWII, he served in the Royal Artillery, eventually rising to the rank of Major. During the war, further books were published, including Wreckers Must Breathe (1940), The Trojan Horse (1940) and Attack Alarm (1941), the last of which was based on his experiences as an anti-aircraft gunner during the Battle of Britain at RAF Kenley. After being demobilized in 1946, he worked full-time as a writer, achieving multiple early successes. His novels are known for a fine attention to accurate detail in descriptions of places, such as in Air Bridge (1951), set partially at RAF Gatow, RAF Membury after its closure and RAF Wunstorf during the Berlin Airlift.

Innes produced books in a regular sequence, with six months of travel to settings all over the world and research followed by six months of writing. Many of his works featured events at sea and of metallurgy. His output decreased in the 1960s, but was still substantial. He became interested in ecological themes, as in High Stand, his "tree" novel. He continued writing until just before his death. His last novel was Delta Connection (1996).

Innes' protagonists were often not "heroes" in the typical sense, but ordinary men suddenly thrust into extreme situations by circumstance. Often, this involved being placed in a hostile environment (the Arctic, the open sea, deserts), or unwittingly becoming involved in a larger conflict or conspiracy. The protagonist generally is forced to rely on his own wits and making best use of limited resources, rather than the weapons and gadgetry commonly used by thriller writers.

Four of his early novels were adapted into films: Snowbound (1948) from The Lonely Skier (1947), Hell Below Zero (1954) from The White South (1949), Campbell's Kingdom (1957) from the book of the same name (1952), and The Wreck of the Mary Deare (1959) also from the book of the same name (1956). His 1973 novel Golden Soak was adapted into a six-part television series in 1979. It was partly filmed in Nullagine, Western Australia. An audio adaptation of The Doomed Oasis was repeated on the UK digital radio station BBC Radio 7 (now called BBC Radio 4 Extra).

In 1937, he married actress Dorothy Mary Lang, who died in 1989. Innes's great love and experience of the sea as a yachtsman, was reflected in many of his novels, as well as his interest in metallurgy. Hammond and his wife both travelled in and raced their yachts Triune of Troy and Mary Deare. They lived together in Suffolk for many years, in the village of Kersey. After their deaths, they left the bulk of their estate and all of their Public Lending Rights to the Association of Sea Training Organisations, to enable young people to gain training and experience in sailing the element they both loved.

In 1978, Hammond Innes was appointed a Commander of the Order of the British Empire (CBE) for his services to literature.

== Bibliography ==
=== Novels ===
- The Doppelganger (1936)
- Air Disaster (1937)
- Sabotage Broadcast (1938)
- All Roads Lead to Friday (1939)
- Wreckers Must Breathe (also published in the U.S. as Trapped) (1940)
- The Trojan Horse (1940)
- Attack Alarm (1941)
- Dead and Alive (1946)
- Killer Mine (1947)
- The Lonely Skier (also published in the U.S. as Fire in the Snow) (1947)
- The Blue Ice (1948)
- Maddon's Rock (also published in the U.S. as Gale Warning) (1948)
- The White South (also published in the U.S. as The Survivors) (1949)
- The Angry Mountain (1950)
- Air Bridge (1951)
- Campbell's Kingdom (1952)
- The Strange Land (also published in the U.S. as The Naked Land) (1954)
- The Mary Deare (also published in the U.S. as The Wreck of the Mary Deare) (1956)
- The Land God Gave to Cain (1958)
- The Doomed Oasis (1960)
- Atlantic Fury (1962)
- The Strode Venturer (1965)
- Levkas Man (1971), adapted for television as Levkas Man (1981)
- Golden Soak (1973), adapted for television as Golden Soak
- North Star (1974)
- The Big Footprints (1977)
- The Last Voyage: Captain Cook's Lost Diary (fictionalised account of Captain Cook's third and last voyage) (1978)
- Solomon's Seal (1980)
- The Black Tide (1982)
- High Stand (1985)
- Medusa (1988)
- Isvik (1991)
- Target Antarctica (1993)
- Delta Connection (1996)

=== Books for children (as Ralph Hammond) ===
- Cocos Gold (1950)
- Isle of Strangers (1951)
- Saracen's Tower (1952)
- Black Gold on the Double Diamond (1953)

=== Non-fiction ===
- Harvest of Journeys. Knopf. 1960. ISBN 978-0-00-612180-0.
- Scandinavia (1963)
- Sea and Islands (1967)
- The Conquistadors. Collins. 1969. ISBN 978-0-00-217531-9.
- Hammond Innes Introduces Australia. Andre Deutsch. 1971.
- East Anglia (1986)

== See also ==
- Nevil Shute
