= Air Bridge =

1951 novel by Hammond Innes

- First edition
- Author: Hammond Innes
- Language: English
- Genre: Thriller
- Publisher: Collins
- Publication date: 1951
- Publication place: United Kingdom
- Media type: Print

Air Bridge is a 1951 thriller novel by the British writer Hammond Innes.

It is set during the Berlin Airlift, and features a former RAF pilot now on the run from the police after becoming involved in shady activities after the war. Like all of Innes' novels, it is notable for a fine attention to accurate detail in descriptions of places, such as in Air Bridge RAF Gatow, RAF Membury after its closure, and RAF Wunstorf during the Berlin Airlift. As part of his research Innes hitched a lift with the RAF into Berlin at the height of the blockade.

== Bibliography ==
- James Vinson & D. L. Kirkpatrick. Contemporary Novelists. St. James Press, 1986.
