= The Blue Ice =

1948 novel by Hammond Innes

- First edition
- Author: Hammond Innes
- Language: English
- Genre: Thriller
- Publisher: Collins
- Publication date: 1948
- Publication place: United Kingdom
- Media type: Print

The Blue Ice is a 1948 thriller novel by the British writer Hammond Innes and published by Collins.

== Bibliography ==
- James Vinson & D. L. Kirkpatrick. Contemporary Novelists. St. James Press, 1986.
