= Solomon's Seal (novel) =

1980 novel by Hammond Innes

- First edition
- Author: Hammond Innes
- Language: English
- Genre: Thriller
- Publisher: Collins
- Publication date: 1980
- Publication place: United Kingdom
- Media type: Print

Solomon's Seal is a 1980 thriller novel by the British writer Hammond Innes. It was published in the United Kingdom by Collins and in the United States by Knopf.

== Bibliography ==
- James Vinson & D. L. Kirkpatrick. Contemporary Novelists. St. James Press, 1986.
