= Golden Soak =

- Based on: Golden Soak by Hammond Innes
- Written by: Peter Yeldham
- Directed by: Henri Safran
- Starring: Ray Barrett; Elizabeth Alexander; Bill Hunter
- Countries of origin: Australia; United Kingdom
- Original language: English
- No. of episodes: 6 x 1 hour

Original release
- Network: ABC; BBC 1
- Release: 13 March – 17 April 1979

Golden Soak is a 1979 Australian-British mini-series about an English mining engineer who travels to Australia. It was based on the 1973 book of the same title written by Hammond Innes.

In the Netherlands, the series was broadcast under the title De Verlaten Mijn ("The abandoned mine"). Its theme music, The Lonely Shepherd by the James Last Orchestra and soloist Gheorghe Zamfir, reached the top 5 in the Dutch Top 40 in 1979.

== Cast ==
- Ray Barrett as Alec Hamilton
- Elizabeth Alexander as Janet Garrety
- Bill Hunter as Chris Culpin
- Christiane Kruger as Rosa Hamilton
- David Cameron as Johnny Culpin
- Ruth Cracknell as Prophesy
- Les Foxcroft as Jacko
- Ken Blackburn as Sergeant Reynolds
