= Bluefire Supercomputer =

The Bluefire Supercomputer is an IBM supercomputer installed in May 2008 by the National Center for Atmospheric Research (NCAR). It is used to advance research into severe weather and the future of Earth's climate.

== Usage ==
Scientists at NCAR, and across the country, use the system to accelerate research into climate change, including future patterns of precipitation and drought around the world, changes to agriculture and growing seasons, and the complex influence of global warming on hurricanes. Researchers also use it to improve weather forecasting models so society can better anticipate where and when dangerous storms may strike.

== Performance ==
Bluefire has a peak speed of more than 76 teraflops (76 trillion floating-point operations per second). When first installed, it was ranked at number 38 on the list of the world's most powerful supercomputers.

== ICESS ==
Bluefire is the second phase of a system called the Integrated Computing Environment for Scientific Simulation (ICESS) at NCAR. The first phase was called Blueice. After undergoing acceptance testing, Bluefire began full operations in August 2008 and replaced three supercomputers with an aggregate peak speed of 20 teraflop.

== Hardware ==
Bluefire uses the POWER6 microprocessor, each having a clock speed of 4.7 gigahertz. The system consists of 4,064 such processors, 12 terabytes of memory, and 150 terabytes of DS4800 disk storage.

== Cooling system ==
Bluefire relies on a water-based cooling system that is 33 percent more energy efficient than traditional air-cooled systems. Heat is removed from the electronics by water-chilled copper plates mounted in direct contact with each POWER6 microprocessor chip. As a result of this water-cooled system and POWER6 efficiencies, Bluefire is three times more energy efficient per rack than its predecessor.
