= The Black Tide =

1982 novel by Hammond Innes

- First edition cover
- Author: Hammond Innes
- Language: English
- Genre: Mystery thriller
- Publisher: Collins
- Publication date: August 23, 1982
- Publication place: United Kingdom
- Media type: Print
- Pages: 352
- ISBN: 0-002-22618-9

The Black Tide is a 1982 mystery thriller novel by the British writer Hammond Innes. It was first published in The United Kingdom August 23, 1982. It was published in America the following year by Doubleday.

== Bibliography ==
- James Vinson & D. L. Kirkpatrick. Contemporary Novelists. St. James Press, 1986.
