= Golden Soak (novel) =

1973 novel by Hammond Innes

- First edition
- Author: Hammond Innes
- Language: English
- Genre: Thriller
- Publisher: Collins
- Publication date: 1973
- Publication place: United Kingdom
- Media type: Print

Golden Soak is a 1973 thriller novel by the British writer Hammond Innes. It was adapted into a 1979 Australian television series of the same title. In 1981 it was adapted to a children's story.

With his Cornish mining business struggling, a man fakes his own death and heads to Western Australia where he becomes mixed up with intrigue concerning huge copper deposits in the Gibson Desert.

== Bibliography ==
- James Vinson & D. L. Kirkpatrick. Contemporary Novelists. St. James Press, 1986.
