= Blue Ice (video game) =

1996 video game

- Developer: Art of Mind Productions
- Publisher: Psygnosis
- Platforms: MS-DOS, Mac OS, Windows
- Release: 1996
- Genre: Adventure
- Mode: Single-player

Blue Ice is a point-and-click adventure game developed and published by Psygnosis. It was released in 1996 for Microsoft Windows, MS-DOS, and Macintosh, The player navigates a sequence of screens representing the rooms in a large house. The player completes puzzles by collecting and using items. Puzzles include brewing tea, dissolving gold in vitriol, finding keys, and making blue paint.

== Gameplay ==
Each screen is overlaid with grainy photographs of up to five people, any of whom can be clicked on to read their thoughts. The thoughts contain clues as to what the player is supposed to do in the room. A description of the room is read in orotund style as a voice-over by actor Tom Conti upon first visiting a location, and is also available to read on-screen. There are extra clues in the form of question marks hidden in each screen. Clicking them gives another voice-over that provides a cryptic clue. The first screen includes an additional tool that identifies and describes inventory items. Items to be clicked on often blend in with the background, hence tending toward hunt-the-pixel gameplay. In addition, some sequences of actions have to be repeated over a dozen times.

A right-click accesses a horizontal-scrolling sequence of icons, which includes three tools - one to move between locations, one to read thoughts/activate clues and one to pick up or manipulate objects. The same set of icons includes the inventory items. It is also possible to navigate between locations by right-clicking and dragging on a widget at the bottom of the screen that shows thumbnails of visited locations, and then left-clicking to select one. Loading and saving features a similar interface, with save slots represented by Greek letters.

== Plot ==
The game takes place in a fictional kingdom called Icia, in which millions of laws have been contrived by its succession of rulers. The senseless law-making began with King Edward I, who found that he could blame the loss of his newborn child on the innocent Orseppro and banish her from the kingdom. Ever since, the monarchs of Icia invented laws to cover up their own mistakes and shortcomings. When King Edward DCCXI (711th) dies prematurely, his twelve-year-old son is left with the impossible task of learning all the rules of the kingdom before he comes of age and inherits it. During this kingless period, it is stated that 'time stops'. The player's goal is to teach Edward that the laws are fuelling suffering and unhappiness in the kingdom, including his own. To do this, the player must complete tasks related to five pleasures of life - art, music, food, love and nature - that were otherwise restricted and shackled by laws.

In the king's residence are the servants to Edward, the cook, Daisy Scraggend; her daughter, Pollyanna; and Olly, a farmhand. The final character in the game is Hope, a personification of hope who provides an optimistic outlook.

There are twenty-eight major locations that the player visits.
